= 51st César Awards =

Awards ceremony

- Official poster featuring a still frame from C'est la vie! (2017)
- Date: 26 February 2026
- Site: Olympia, Paris
- Hosted by: Benjamin Lavernhe

Highlights
- Best Film: The Ties That Bind Us
- Best Actor: Laurent Lafitte; The Richest Woman in the World
- Best Actress: Léa Drucker; Case 137
- Most awards: Nouvelle Vague (4)
- Most nominations: Nouvelle Vague (10)

Television coverage
- Network: Canal+

The 51st César Awards ceremony, presented by the Académie des Arts et Techniques du Cinéma, was held on 26 February 2026 at the Olympia in Paris, to honour the best French films of 2025. It was originally scheduled to be held on 27 February 2026. Actress Camille Cottin presided over the ceremony for the first time. It was hosted by Benjamin Lavernhe, who was accompanied by a group of artists. The ceremony was televised in France by Canal+.

Canadian actor Jim Carrey received the Honorary César. The nominations were announced on 28 January 2026. Nouvelle Vague led with 10 nominations, followed by Case 137 and The Ties That Bind Us with 8 each.

Nouvelle Vague won four awards, including Best Director for Richard Linklater, becoming the second American filmmaker to win it. The Ties That Bind Us won Best Film.

== Nominees ==
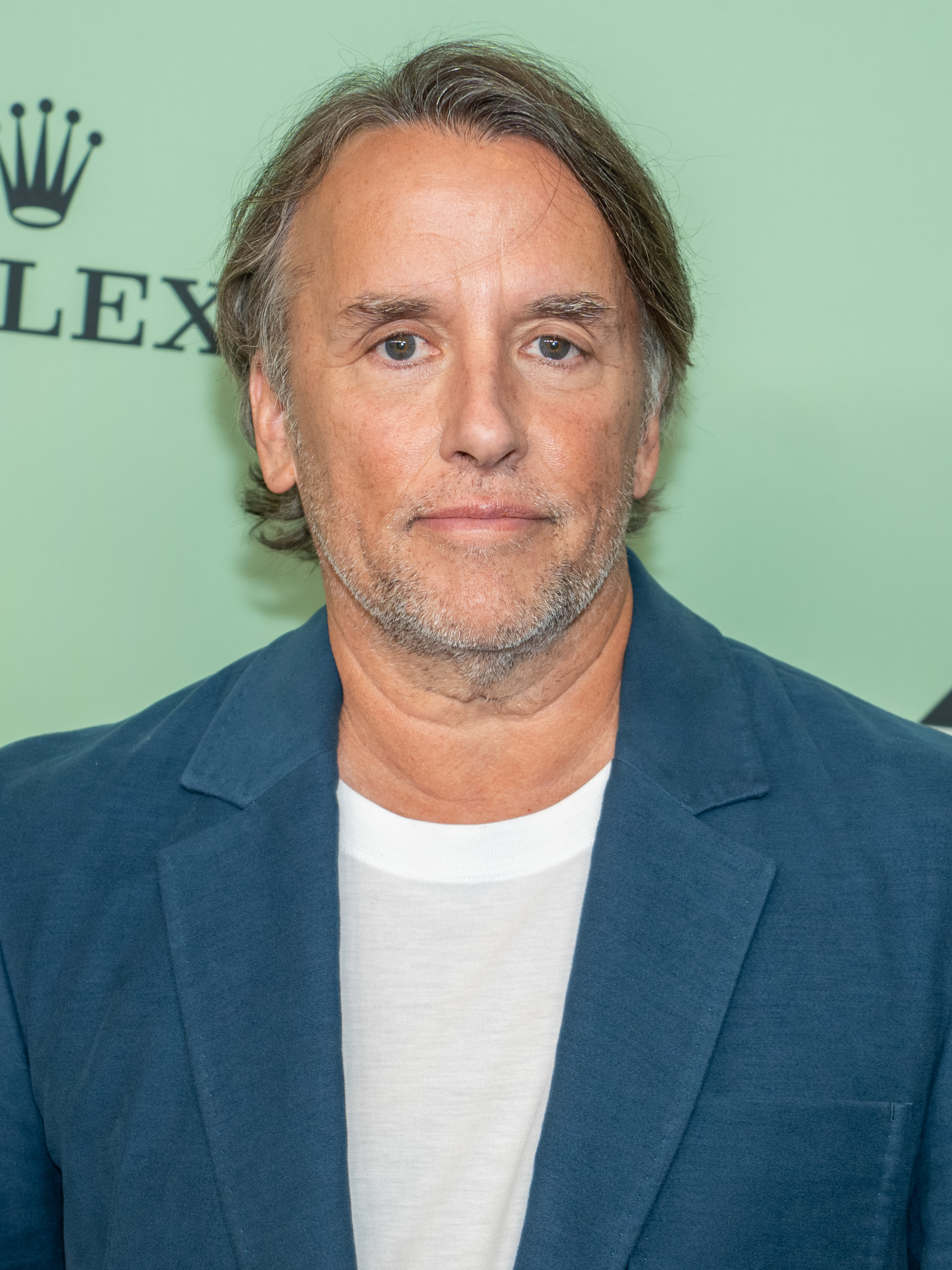
Richard Linklater, Best Director winner

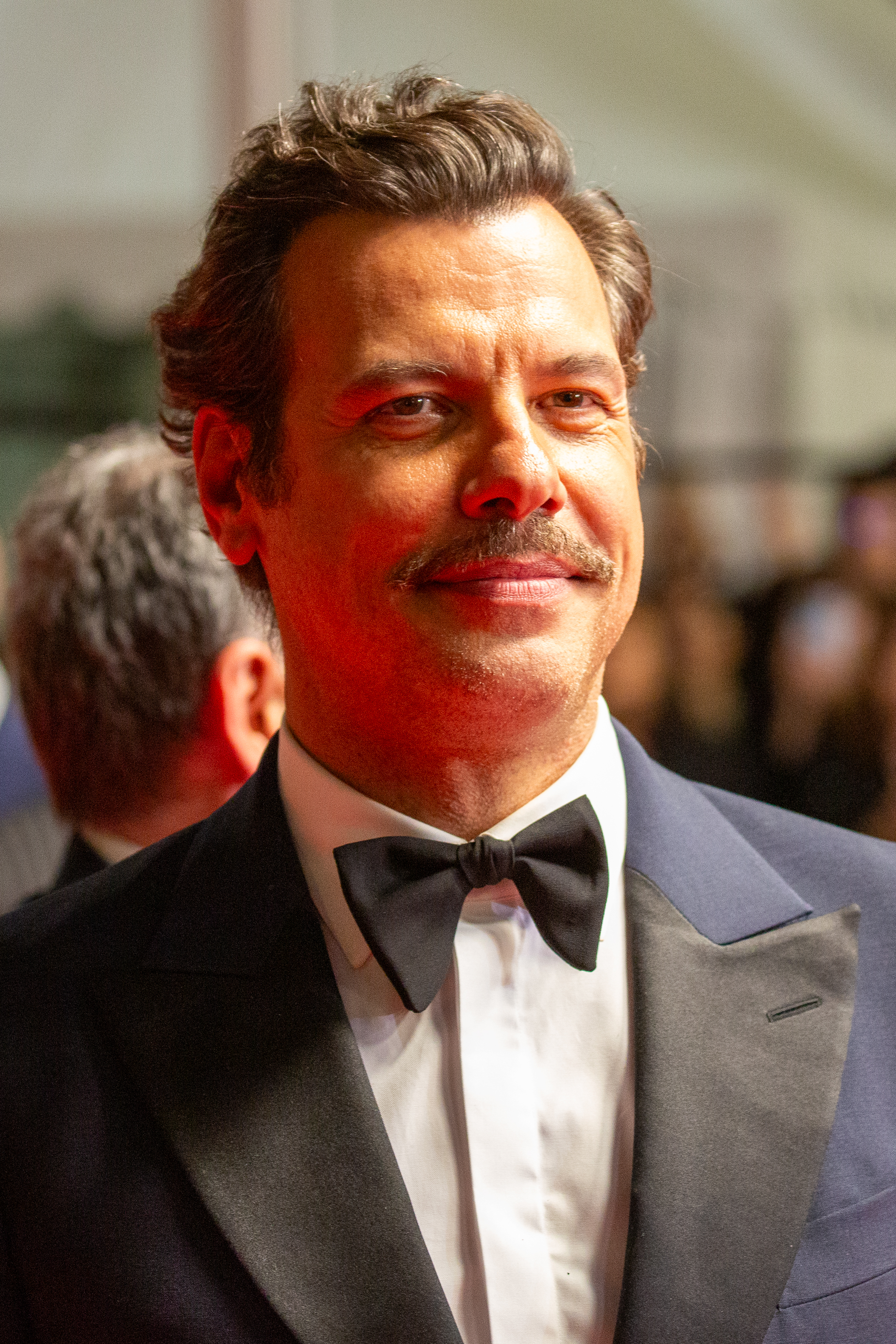
Laurent Lafitte, Best Actor winner

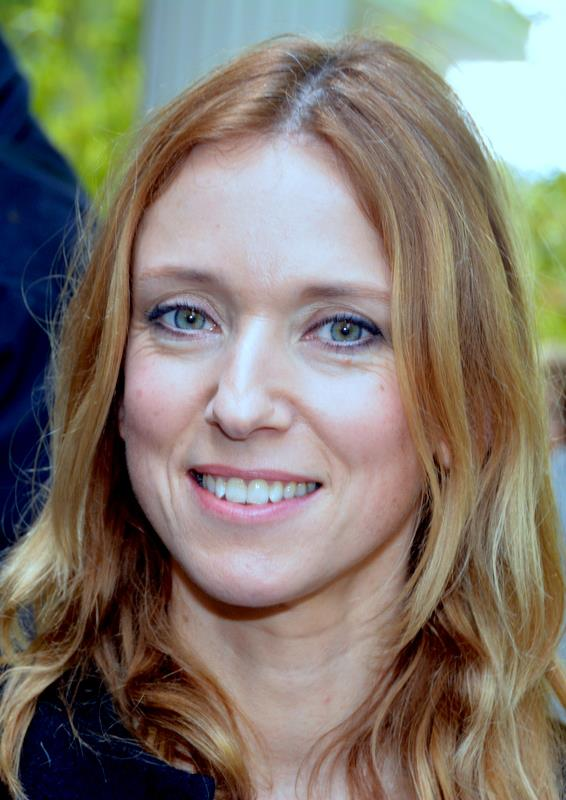
Léa Drucker, Best Actress winner

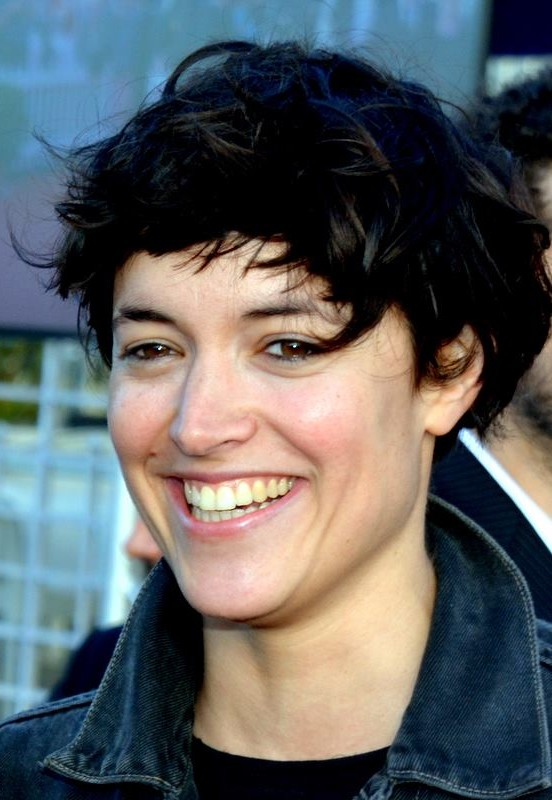
Vimala Pons, Best Supporting Actress winner

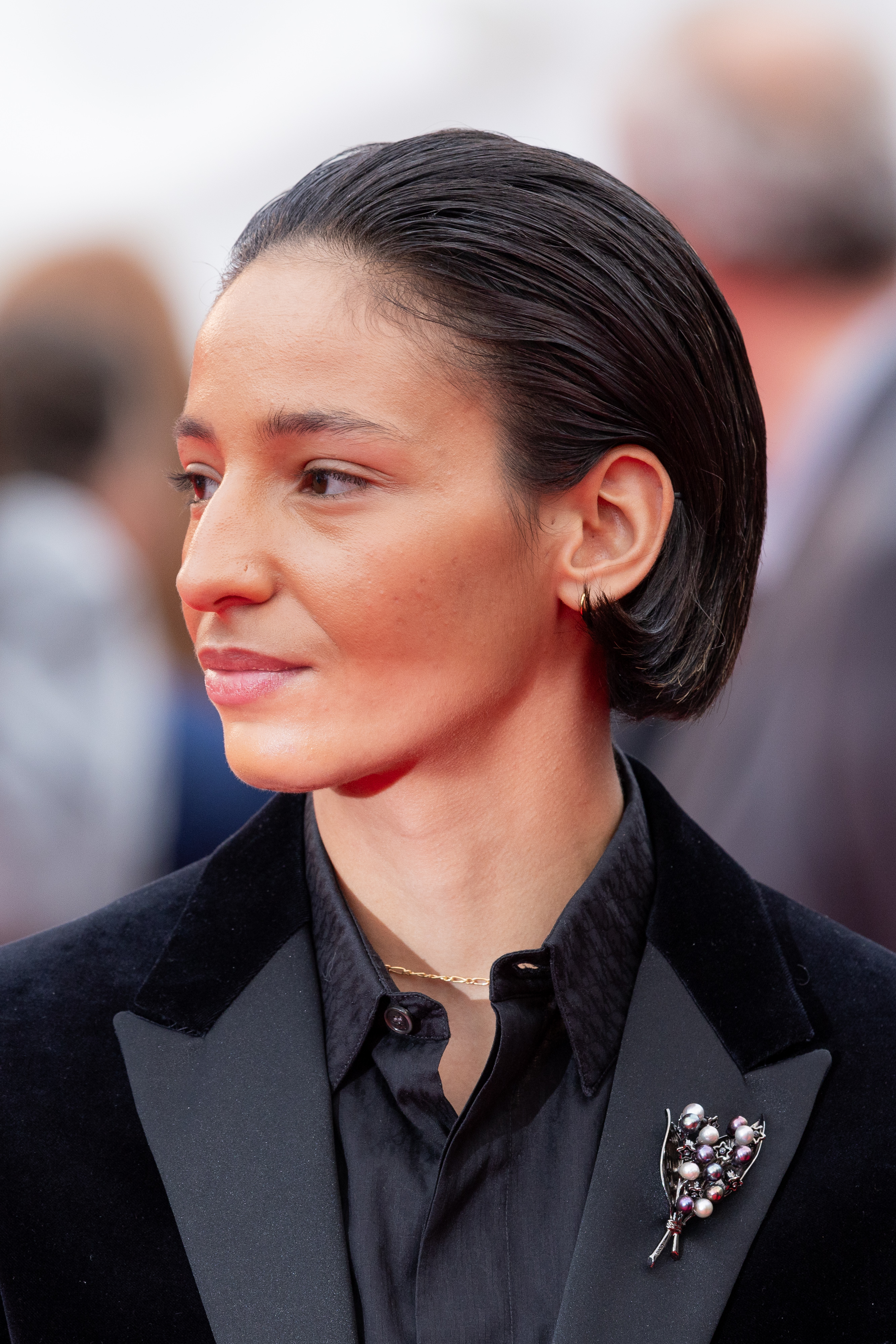
Nadia Melliti, Best Female Revelation winner

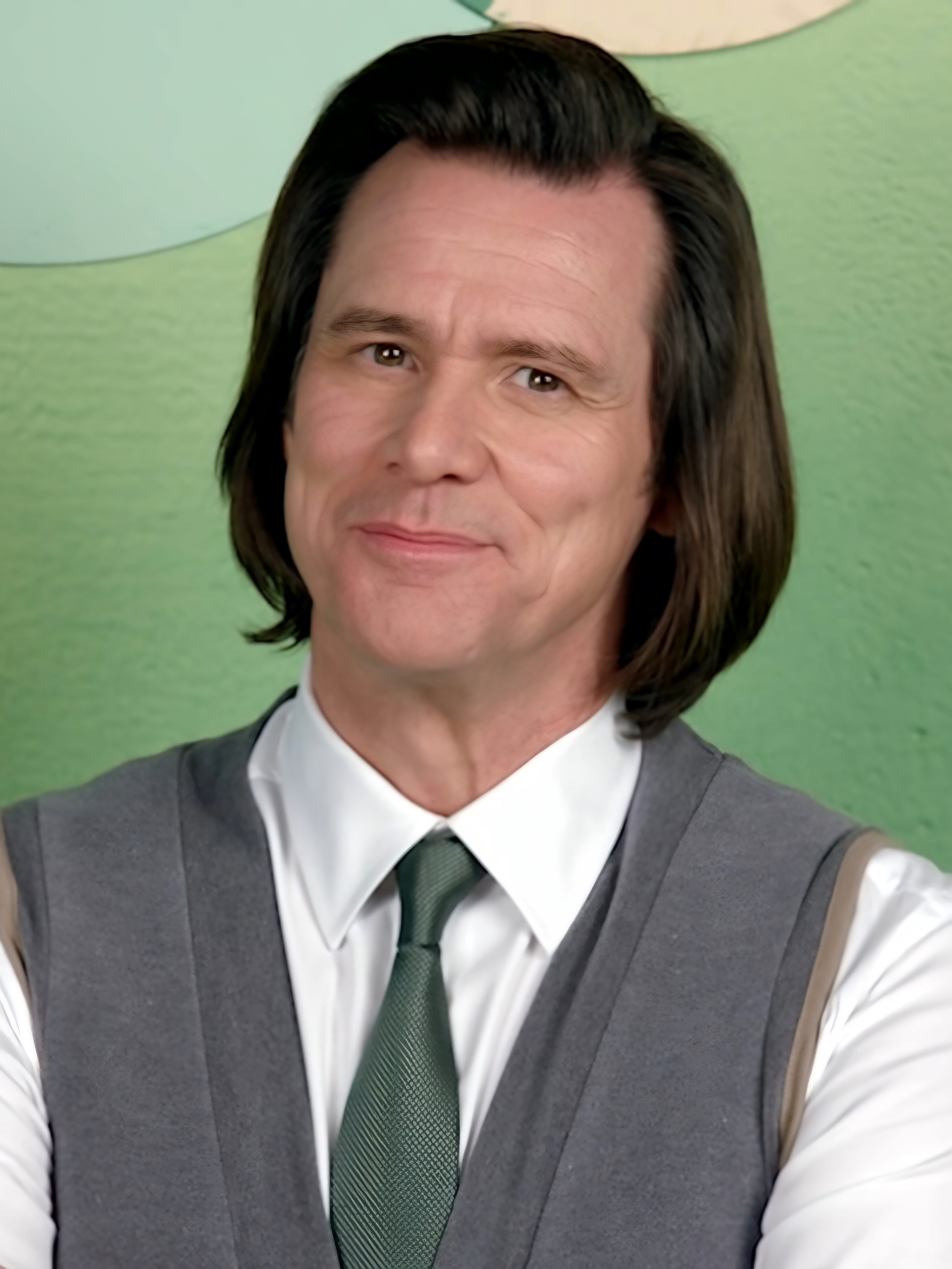
Jim Carrey, Honorary César recipient

Best Film: The Ties That Bind Us – produced by Fabrice Goldstein, Antoine Rein, directed by Carine Tardieu; Case 137 – produced by Caroline Benjo, Barbara Letellier, Carole Scotta, directed by Dominik Moll; It Was Just an Accident – produced by Philippe Martin, directed by Jafar Panahi; The Little Sister, produced by Julie Bily, Naomi Denamur, directed by Hafsia Herzi; Nouvelle Vague – produced by Michèle Pétin, Laurent Pétin, directed by Richard Linklater	Best Director: Richard Linklater – Nouvelle Vague; Carine Tardieu – The Ties That Bind Us; Dominik Moll – Case 137; Hafsia Herzi – The Little Sister; Stéphane Demoustier – The Great Arch
Best Actor: Laurent Lafitte – The Richest Woman in the World as Pierre-Alain Fantin; Bastien Bouillon – Leave One Day as Raphaël; Benjamin Voisin – The Stranger as Meursault; Claes Bang – The Great Arch as Johan Otto von Spreckelsen; Pio Marmaï – The Ties That Bind Us as Alexandre "Alex" Perthuis	Best Actress: Léa Drucker – Case 137 as Stéphanie Bertrand; Isabelle Huppert – The Richest Woman in the World as Marianne Farrère; Leïla Bekhti – Once Upon My Mother as Esther Perez; Mélanie Thierry – Mariana’s Room as Mariana; Valeria Bruni Tedeschi – The Ties That Bind Us as Sandra Ferney
Best Supporting Actor: Pierre Lottin – The Stranger as Raymond Sintès; Michel Fau – The Great Arch as François Mitterrand; Raphael Personnaz – The Richest Woman in the World as Jérôme Bonjean; Swann Arlaud – The Great Arch as Paul Andreu; Xavier Dolan – The Great Arch as Jean-Louis Subilon	Best Supporting Actress: Vimala Pons – The Ties That Bind Us as Emillia Demetriu; Dominique Blanc – Leave One Day as Fanfan; Jeanne Balibar – Nino as Nino's mother; Marina Foïs – The Richest Woman in the World as Frédérique Spielman; Park Ji-min – The Little Sister as Ji-Na
Best Male Revelation: Théodore Pellerin – Nino as Nino; Idir Azougli – Meteors as Daniel Mezziani; Sayyid El Alami – Block Pass as Willy; Félix Lefebvre – Hearts on Fire as Hugo; Guillaume Marbeck – Nouvelle Vague as Jean-Luc Godard	Best Female Revelation: Nadia Melliti – The Little Sister as Fatima; Manon Clavel – Kika as Kika; Suzanne Lindon – Colours of Time as Adèle; Camille Rutherford – Jane Austen Wrecked My Life as Agathe Robinson; Anja Verderosa – Hearts on Fire as Queen
Best Original Screenplay: How To Make A Killing – Franck Dubosc and Sarah Kaminsky; Case 137 – Dominik Moll and Gilles Marchand; It Was Just an Accident – Jafar Panahi; Nino – Pauline Loquès; Nouvelle Vague – Holly Gent and Vince Palmo	Best Adaptation: The Ties That Bind Us – Carine Tardieu, Raphaële Moussafir, Agnès Feuvre; based on the novel L'Intimité by Alice Ferney; The Great Arch – Stéphane Demoustier; based on the novel La Grande Arche by Laurence Cossé; The Little Sister – Hafsia Herzi; based on the novel The Last One by Fatima Daas
Best First Feature Film: Nino – directed by Pauline Loqués; produced by Sandra da Fonseca; Arco – directed by Ugo Bienvenu; produced by Félix de Givry, Ugo Bienvenu, Sophie Mas and Natalie Portman; Block Pass – directed by Antoine Chevrollier; produced by Nicolas Blanc; Hearts on Fire – directed by Aurélien Peyre; produced by Bruno Levy; Leave One Day – directed by Amélie Bonnin; produced by Bastien Daret, Arthur Goisset Mohamed, Robin Robles, Sylvie Pialat and Benoît Quainon	Best Cinematography: Nouvelle Vague – David Chambille; Case 137 – Patrick Ghiringhelli; The Girl in the Snow – Marine Atlan; The Stranger – Manuel Dacosse; The Ties That Bind Us – Elin Kirschfink
Best Editing: Nouvelle Vague – Catherine Schwartz; 13 Days, 13 Nights – Stan Collet; Case 137 – Laurent Rouan; The Little Sister – Géraldine Mangenot; The Ties That Bind Us – Christel Dewynter	Best Sound: Whispers in the Woods – Romain Cadilhac, Marc Namblard, Olivier Touche and Olivier Goinard; Arco – Nicolas Becker, Andrea Ferrera and Damien Lazzerini; Case 137 – François Maurel, Rym Debbarh-Mounir and Nathalie Vidal; Leave One Day – Rémi Chanaud, Jeanne Delplanco, Fanny Martin and Niels Barletta; Nouvelle Vague – Jean minondo, Serge Rouquairol and Christophe Vingtrinier
Best Original Music: Arco – Arnaud Toulon; Case 137 – Olivier Marguerit; The Stranger – Fatima Al Qadiri; The Richest Woman in the World – Alex Beaupain; The Little Sister – Amine Bouhafa	Best Costume Design: Nouvelle Vague – Pascaline Chavanne; Colours of Time – Pierre-Yves Gayraud; La Condition – Céline Guignard; Dracula – Corinne Bruand; The Richest Woman in the World – Jürgen Doering
Best Production Design: The Great Arch – Catherine Cosme; Colours of Time – Marie Cheminal; Dog 51 – Jean-Philippe Moreaux; Nouvelle Vague – Katia Wyszkop; Once Upon My Mother – Riton Dupire-Clément	Best Documentary Film: Whispers in the Woods – directed by Vincent Munier; produced by Pierre-Emmanuel Fleurantin, Laurent Baujard and Vincent Munier; The Fifth Shot of La Jetée – directed by Dominique Cabrera; produced by Edmée Doroszlai and Caroline glorion; Put Your Soul on Your Hand and Walk – directed by Sepideh Farsi; produced by Javad Djavahery; Ride Away – directed by Mathias Mlekuz; produced by Jean-Louis Livi and Marc-Etienne Schwartz; Sarkozy – Gaddafi: the Scandal of Scandals – directed by Yannick Kergoat; produced by Gabrielle Juhel and Valentina novati
Best Animated Feature Film: Arco – directed by Ugo Bienvenu; produced by Félix de Givry, Ugo Bienvenu, Sophie Mas and Natalie Portman; Little Amélie or the Character of Rain – directed by Maïlys Vallade and Liane-Cho Han; produced by Nidia Santiago, Edwina Liard, Claire La Combe and Henri Magalon; My Castle Life: Growing Up in Versailles – directed by Clémence Madeleine-Perdrillat and Nathaniel H’Lim; produced by Lionel Massol	Best Animated Short Film: Fille de l’eau – directed by Sandra Desmazières; produced by Jérôme Barthélémy, Daniel Sauvage, and Olivier Catherin; Les Belles Cicatrices – directed by Raphaël Jouzeau; produced by Francesca Bettini-Barnes and Charlotte Vande Vyvre; God Is Shy – directed by Jocelyn Charles; produced by Félix de Givry, Ugo Bienvenu, and Josephine Mancini
Best Fiction Short Film: Mort d’un Acteur – directed by Ambroise Rateau; produced by Lucas Tothe and Jessica Arfuso; Big Boys Don’t Cry – directed by Arnaud Delmarle; produced by Ane Luthaud and Joanna Sitkwoska; Two People Exchanging Saliva – directed by Natalie Musteata and Alexandre Singh; produced by Valentina Merli and Violeta Kreimer; Wonderwall – directed by Róisín Burns, produced by Mathilde Delaunay	Best Documentary Short Film: Au Bain des Dames – directed by Margaux fournier; produced by Laureen Bolton and Audrey Amadja Iritz; Car Wash – directed by Laïs Decaster; produced by Nathan Jactel and Gabrielle Voigt; Ni Dieu ni père – directed by Paul Kermarec; produced by Stéphane Marchal and Nelson Ghrénassia
Best Foreign Film: One Battle After Another (United States) – directed by Paul Thomas Anderson; Black Dog (China) – directed by Guan Hu; The Secret Agent (Brazil / France / Germany / Netherlands) – directed by Kleber Mendonça Filho; Sentimental Value (Norway / France / Germany / Sweden / Denmark / United Kingdom) – directed by Joachim Trier; Sirāt (Spain / France) – directed by Oliver Laxe	Best Visual Effects: The Great Arch – Lise Fischer; Dog 51 – Cédric Fayolle; Nouvelle Vague – Alain Carsoux; The Shrinking Man – Rodolphe Chabrier and Benoit de Longlée
Honorary César: Jim Carrey

=== Films with multiple nominations ===
The following films received multiple nominations:

Nominations	Films
10	Nouvelle Vague
8	Case 137
8	The Ties That Bind Us
8	The Great Arch
7	The Little Sister
6	The Richest Woman in the World
4	Arco
4	The Stranger
4	Nino
4	Leave One Day
3	Colours of Time
3	Hearts on Fire
2	It Was Just an Accident
2	Once Upon My Mother
2	Block Pass
2	Dog 51
2	Whispers in the Woods

=== Films with multiple wins ===
The following films received multiple awards:

Wins	Films
4	Nouvelle Vague
3	The Ties That Bind Us
2	Arco
2	The Great Arch
2	Nino
2	Whispers in the Woods

== See also ==
- 98th Academy Awards
- 79th British Academy Film Awards
- 38th European Film Awards
- 83rd Golden Globe Awards
- 40th Goya Awards
- 31st Lumière Awards
- 15th Magritte Awards
