= List of French films of 2019 =

A list of French-produced films scheduled for release in 2019.

== Films ==
Title	Director	Cast	Notes	Release date	Ref
A Son (Bik Eneich: Un fils)	Mehdi Barsaoui	Najla Ben Abdallah, Sami Bouajila, Youssef Khemiri		August 30, 2019	
La Belle Époque	Nicolas Bedos	Daniel Auteuil, Fanny Ardant, Doria Tiller, Guillaume Canet			
By the Grace of God (Grâce à Dieu)	François Ozon	Melvil Poupaud, Denis Ménochet, Swann Arlaud			
I Lost My Body	Jérémy Clapin				
Les Invisibles	Louis-Julien Petit				
It Must Be Heaven	Elia Suleiman		International co-production		
Les Misérables	Ladj Ly				
Pompei	Anna Falguères, John Shank	Aliocha Schneider, Garance Marillier, Vincent Rottiers	International co-production		
Portrait of a Lady on Fire (Portrait de la jeune fille en feu)	Céline Sciamma	Noémie Merlant, Adèle Haenel, Valeria Golino			
Proxima	Alice Winocour	Eva Green, Matt Dillon, Lars Eidinger, Sandra Hüller			
Quand on crie au loup	Marilou Berry	Noé Wodecki, Marilou Berry, Gérard Jugnot			
The Shiny Shrimps (Les crevettes pailletées)	Maxime Govare, Cédric Le Gallo	Nicolas Gob, Alban Lenoir, Michaël Abiteboul, Geoffrey Couët			
Spread Your Wings (Donne-moi des ailes)	Nicolas Vanier				
Sympathy for the Devil (Sympathie pour le diable)	Guillaume de Fontenay	Niels Schneider, Vincent Rottiers, Ella Rumpf			
The Translators (Les Traducteurs)	Régis Roinsard	Lambert Wilson, Alex Lawther, Olga Kurylenko, Riccardo Scamarcio		November 23	
Tremors (Temblores)	Jayro Bustamante	Juan Pablo Olyslager, Diane Bathen, Mauricio Armas Zebadúa	Guatemalan-French coproduction		
The Truth (La vérité)	Hirokazu Kore-eda	Catherine Deneuve, Juliette Binoche, Ethan Hawke, Ludivine Sagnier		August 28	
The Wolf's Call (Le Chant du loup)	Antonin Baudry				
