= 26th Lumière Awards =

2021 French film awards ceremony

- Date: 19 January 2021
- Hosted by: Laurie Cholewa; Laurent Weil

Highlights
- Best Film: Love Affair(s)
- Most awards: Josep, Summer of 85 and Two of Us (2)
- Most nominations: Two of Us (6)

Television coverage
- Network: Canal+

The 26th Lumière Awards ceremony, presented by the Académie des Lumières, took place on 19 January 2021 to honour the best in French-speaking cinema of 2020. The show was hosted by French journalists Laurie Cholewa and Laurent Weil. Canal+ broadcast the ceremony.

Love Affair(s) won the Best Film. The ceremony paid tribute to Spanish journalist and a Lumières long-standing member, José María Riba.

== Winners and nominees ==
The nominations were announced on 14 December 2020. Winners are listed first, highlighted in boldface, and indicated with a double dagger (‡).

**Best Film**: **Love Affair(s) – Emmanuel Mouret**‡; Bye Bye Morons – Albert Dupontel; The Girl with a Bracelet – Stéphane Demoustier; Summer of 85 – François Ozon; Two of Us – Filippo Meneghetti	**Best Director**: **Maïwenn – DNA**‡; Albert Dupontel – Bye Bye Morons; Filippo Meneghetti – Two of Us; Emmanuel Mouret – Love Affair(s); François Ozon – Summer of 85
**Best Actor**: **Sami Bouajila – A Son as Fares Ben Youssef**‡; Jonathan Cohen – Enormous as Frédéric Girard; Albert Dupontel – Bye Bye Morons as Jean-Baptiste Cuchas; Nicolas Maury – My Best Part as Jérémie Meyer; Jérémie Renier – Slalom as Fred	**Best Actress**: **Martine Chevallier and Barbara Sukowa – Two of Us as Madeleine Girard and Nina Dorn**‡; Laure Calamy – My Donkey, My Lover & I as Antoinette; Emmanuelle Devos – Perfumes as Anne Walberg; Virginie Efira – Bye Bye Morons as Suze Trappet; Camélia Jordana – Love Affair(s) as Daphné
**Best Male Revelation**: **Félix Lefebvre and Benjamin Voisin – Summer of 85 as Alexis Robin and David Gorman**‡; Guang Huo – Night Ride as Jin; Djibril Vancoppenolle – Small Country: An African Childhood as Gabriel; Alexandre Wetter – Miss as Alex; Jean-Pascal Zadi – Simply Black as himself	**Best Female Revelation**: **Noée Abita – Slalom as Lyz**‡; Najla Ben Abdallah – A Son as Meriem Ben Youssef; Nisrin Erradi – Adam as Samia; Mélissa Guers – The Girl with a Bracelet as Lise; Fathia Youssouf – Cuties as Amy
**Best First Film**: **Two of Us – Filippo Meneghetti**‡; Arab Blues – Manele Labidi Labbé; Cuties – Maïmouna Doucouré; Simply Black – Jean-Pascal Zadi and John Wax; Slalom – Charlène Favier	**Best Screenplay**: **The Girl with a Bracelet – Stéphane Demoustier**‡; Josep – Jean-Louis Milesi; Love Affair(s) – Emmanuel Mouret; My Donkey, My Lover & I – Caroline Vignal; Two of Us – Filippo Meneghetti and Malysone Bovarasmy
**Best Cinematography**: **Summer of 85 – Hichame Alaouié**‡; Love Affair(s) – Laurent Desmet; The Salt of Tears – Renato Berta; Slalom – Yann Maritaud; Two of Us – Aurélien Marra	**Best Music**: **Josep – Sílvia Pérez Cruz**‡; Appearances – Bertrand Burgalat; Calamity, a Childhood of Martha Jane Cannary – Florencia Di Concilio; Marona's Fantastic Tale – Pablo Pico; Night Ride – Rone
**Best Documentary**: **The Monopoly of Violence – David Dufresne**‡; Adolescents – Sébastien Lifshitz; If It Were Love – Patric Chiha; Kongo – Corto Vaclav and Hadrien La Vapeur; The Tie – Etienne Chaillou and Mathias Théry	**Best Animated Film**: **Josep – Aurel**‡; Calamity, a Childhood of Martha Jane Cannary – Rémi Chayé; Little Vampire – Joann Sfar; Marona's Fantastic Tale – Anca Damian
**Best International Co-Production**: **The Man Who Sold His Skin ( (Belgium) / (France) / (Tunisia) / (Cyprus) / (Sweden) / (Germany) ) – Kaouther Ben Hania**‡; Abou Leila ( (Algeria) / (France) / (Qatar) ) – Amin Sidi-Boumédiène; Adam ( (Belgium) / (France) / (Morocco) ) – Maryam Touzani; A Son ( (France) / (Lebanon) / (Qatar) / (Tunisia) ) – Mehdi M. Barsaoui; La Llorona ( (Guatemala) / (France) ) – Jayro Bustamante; Yalda ( (France) / (Germany) / (Iran) / (Lebanon) / (Luxembourg) / (Switzerland) ) – Massoud Bakhshi; You Will Die at Twenty ( (Sudan) / (France) / (Egypt) / (Germany) / (Norway) / (Qatar) ) – Amjad Abu Alala

=== Films with multiple nominations and awards ===
Films that received multiple nominations
Nominations	Film
6	Two of Us
5	Love Affair(s)
4	Bye Bye Morons
4	Slalom
4	Summer of 85
3	The Girl with a Bracelet
3	Josep
3	A Son
2	Adam
2	Calamity Jane
2	Cuties
2	Marona's Fantastic Tale
2	My Donkey, My Lover & I
2	Night Ride
2	Simply Black

Films that received multiple awards
Awards	Film
2	Josep
2	Summer of 85
2	Two of Us

== See also ==
- 46th César Awards
