= Lumière Award for Best Female Revelation =

Annual French film award

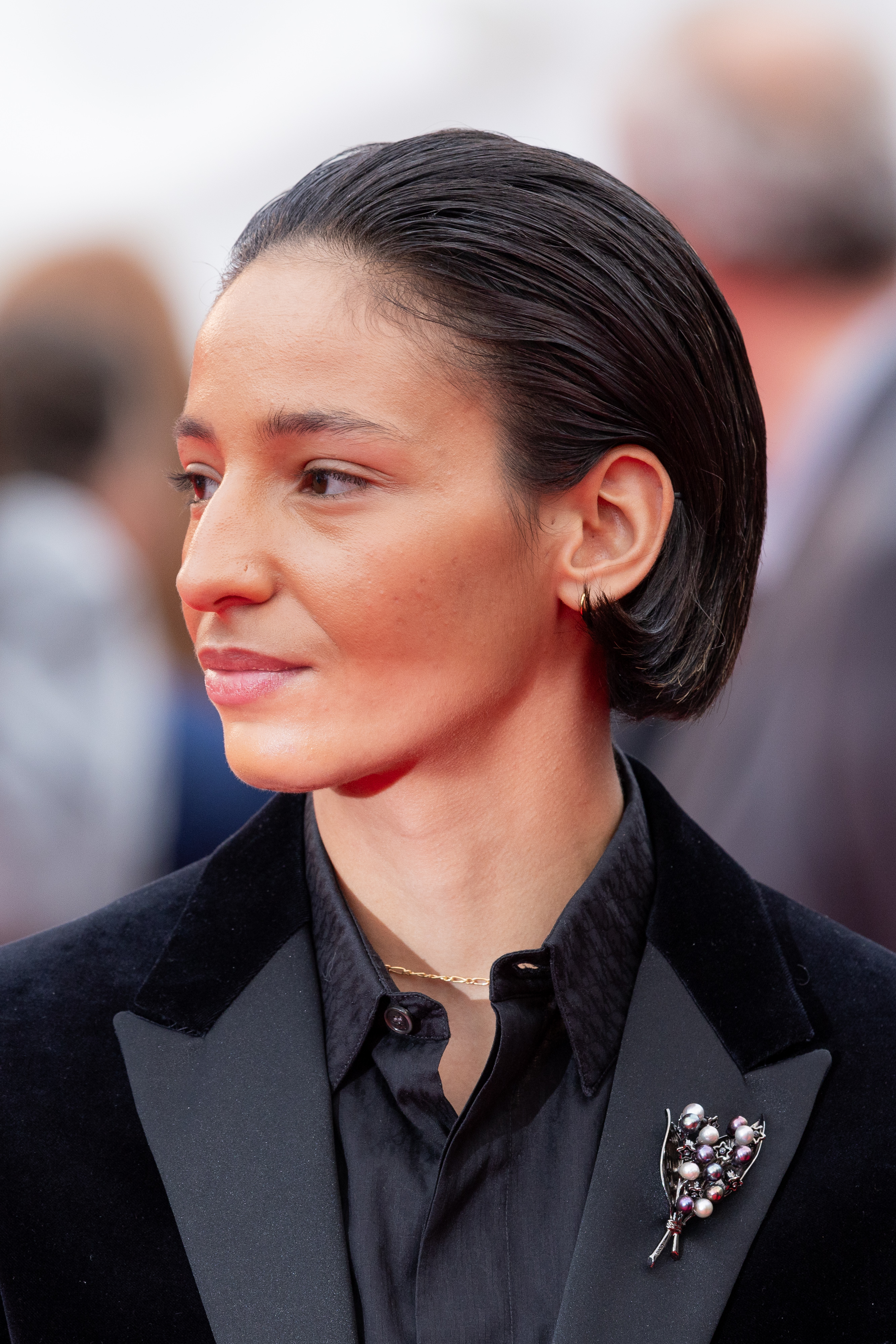
- 2026 recipient: Nadia Melliti
- Country: France
- Presented by: Académie des Lumières
- First award: 2000
- Currently held by: Nadia Melliti for The Little Sister (2026)
- Website: academiedeslumieres.com

The Lumière Award for Best Female Revelation (French: Lumière de la révélation féminine) is an award presented annually by the Académie des Lumières since 2000.

It was presented as the Lumière du meilleur espoir féminin from 2000 to 2013. In English, the award was variously referred to as Most Promising Actress or Best Female Newcomer.

== Winners and nominees ==
Winners are listed first with a blue background, followed by the other nominees.

=== 2000s ===
Year	Winner and nominees	English title	Original title
2000 (5th)	Audrey Tautou	Venus Beauty Institute	Vénus Beauté (Institut)
2001 (6th)	Isild Le Besco	Sade	
2002 (7th)	Rachida Brakni	Chaos	
2003 (8th)	Cécile de France	L'Auberge Espagnole	
2004 (9th)	Sasha Andres	She's One of Us	Elle est des nôtres
2005 (10th)	Lola Naymark	A Common Thread	Brodeuses
2005 (10th)	Marilou Berry	Look at Me	Comme une image
2006 (11th)	Fanny Valette	Little Jerusalem	La Petite Jérusalem
2007 (12th)	Mélanie Laurent	Don't Worry, I'm Fine	Je vais bien, ne t'en fais pas
2007 (12th)	Sandrine Le Berre	Coup de sang	
2007 (12th)	Medeea Marinescu	You Are So Beautiful	Je vous trouve très beau
2007 (12th)	Déborah François	The Page Turner	La Tourneuse de pages
2007 (12th)	Nina Kervel-Bey	Blame It on Fidel	La Faute à Fidel
2008 (13th)	Hafsia Herzi	The Secret of the Grain	La Graine et le Mulet
2008 (13th)	Romola Garai	Angel	
2008 (13th)	Clotilde Hesme	Love Songs	Les Chansons d'amour
2008 (13th)	Audrey Dana	Roman de Gare	
2008 (13th)	Lucie Desclozeaux	Et toi, t'es sur qui?	
2008 (13th)	Christa Theret	Et toi, t'es sur qui?	
2009 (14th)	Nora Arnezeder	Paris 36	Faubourg 36
2009 (14th)	Bertille Noël-Bruneau	The Fox and the Child	Le Renard et l'Enfant
2009 (14th)	Karina Testa	Dolls and Angels	Des poupées et des anges
2009 (14th)	Leïla Bekhti	Dolls and Angels	Des poupées et des anges
2009 (14th)	Léa Seydoux	The Beautiful Person	La Belle Personne
2009 (14th)	Sara Reguigue	Masquerades	Mascarades

=== 2010s ===
Year	Winner and nominees	English title	Original title
2010 (15th)	Pauline Étienne	Silent Voice	Qu'un seul tienne et les autres suivront
2010 (15th)	Christa Theret	LOL (Laughing Out Loud)	
2010 (15th)	Garance Le Guillermic	The Hedgehog	Le Hérisson
2010 (15th)	Mati Diop	35 Shots of Rum	35 Rhums
2010 (15th)	Julie Sokolowski	Hadewijch	
2011 (16th)	Yahima Torres	Black Venus	Vénus noire
2011 (16th)	Lolita Chammah	Copacabana	
2011 (16th)	Marie Féret	Mozart's Sister	Nannerl, la sœur de Mozart
2011 (16th)	Nina Rodriguez	No et moi	
2011 (16th)	Linda Doudaeva	Hands Up	Les Mains en l'air
2012 (17th)	Adèle Haenel	House of Tolerance	L'Apollonide: Souvenirs de la maison close
2012 (17th)	Céline Sallette	House of Tolerance	L'Apollonide: Souvenirs de la maison close
2012 (17th)	Alice Barnole	House of Tolerance	L'Apollonide: Souvenirs de la maison close
2012 (17th)	Anamaria Vartolomei	My Little Princess	
2012 (17th)	Zoé Héran	Tomboy	
2013 (18th)	Julia Faure	Camille Rewinds	Camille Redouble
2013 (18th)	Judith Chemla	Camille Rewinds	Camille Redouble
2013 (18th)	India Hair	Camille Rewinds	Camille Redouble
2013 (18th)	Agathe Bonitzer	A Bottle in the Gaza Sea	Une bouteille à la mer
2013 (18th)	Stéphanie Sokolinski	Augustine	
2013 (18th)	Sofiia Manousha	Le Noir (Te) Vous Va Si Bien	
2013 (18th)	Izïa Higelin	Bad Girl	Mauvaise fille
2014 (19th)	Adèle Exarchopoulos	Blue Is the Warmest Colour	La Vie d'Adèle – Chapitres 1 & 2
2014 (19th)	Vimala Pons	The Rendez-Vous of Déjà-Vu	La Fille du 14 juillet
2014 (19th)	Alice de Lencquesaing	Headfirst	La Tête la première
2014 (19th)	Pauline Etienne	The Nun	La Religieuse
2014 (19th)	Miss Ming	Henri	
2014 (19th)	Marine Vacth	Young & Beautiful	Jeune & Jolie
2015 (20th)	Louane Emera	La Famille Bélier	
2015 (20th)	Joséphine Japy	Respire	
2015 (20th)	Lou de Laâge	Respire	
2015 (20th)	Alice Isaaz	La Crème de la crème	
2015 (20th)	Ariane Labed	Fidelio, l’odyssée d’Alice	
2015 (20th)	Karidja Touré	Girlhood	Bande de filles
2015 (20th)	Ana Girardot	High Society	Le Beau Monde
2015 (20th)	Ana Girardot	La Prochaine fois je viserai le cœur	
2016 (21st)	Güneş Nezihe Şensoy	Mustang	
2016 (21st)	Doğa Zeynep Doğuşlu	Mustang	
2016 (21st)	Elit Işcan	Mustang	
2016 (21st)	Tuğba Sunguroğlu	Mustang	
2016 (21st)	İlayda Akdoğan	Mustang	
2016 (21st)	Golshifteh Farahani	Two Friends	Les Deux Amis
2016 (21st)	Sara Giraudeau	Les Bêtises	
2016 (21st)	Baya Medhaffar	As I Open My Eyes	À peine j'ouvre les yeux
2016 (21st)	Lou Roy-Lecollinet	My Golden Days	Trois souvenirs de ma jeunesse
2016 (21st)	Sophie Verbeeck	All About Them	À trois on y va
2017 (22nd)	Oulaya Amamra	Divines	
2017 (22nd)	Déborah Lukumuena	Divines	
2017 (22nd)	Paula Beer	Frantz	
2017 (22nd)	Lily-Rose Depp	The Dancer	La Danseuse
2017 (22nd)	Manal Issa	Parisienne	Peur de rien
2017 (22nd)	Naomi Amarger	Heaven Will Wait	Le Ciel attendra
2017 (22nd)	Noémie Merlant	Heaven Will Wait	Le Ciel attendra
2017 (22nd)	Raph	Slack Bay	Ma Loute
2018 (23rd)	Laetitia Dosch	Montparnasse Bienvenue	Jeune femme
2018 (23rd)	Iris Bry	The Guardians	Les Gardiennes
2018 (23rd)	Eye Haïdara	C'est la vie!	Le Sens de la fête
2018 (23rd)	Camélia Jordana	Le Brio	
2018 (23rd)	Pamela Ramos	All the Dreams in the World	Tous les rêves du monde
2018 (23rd)	Solène Rigot	Orphan	Orpheline
2019 (24th)	Ophélie Bau	Mektoub, My Love: Canto Uno	
2019 (24th)	Galatea Bellugi	The Apparition	L'Apparition
2019 (24th)	Andréa Bescond	Little Tickles	Les Chatouilles
2019 (24th)	Jeanne Cohendy	Head Above Water	Marche ou crève
2019 (24th)	Kenza Fortas	Shéhérazade	

=== 2020s ===
Year	Winner and nominees	English title	Original title
2020 (25th)	Nina Meurisse	Camille	
2020 (25th)	Céleste Brunnquell	The Dazzled	Les Éblouis
2020 (25th)	Mina Farid	An Easy Girl	Une fille facile
2020 (25th)	Lise Leplat Prudhomme	Joan of Arc	Jeanne
2020 (25th)	Mame Bineta Sane	Atlantics	Atlantique
2021 (26th)	Noée Abita	Slalom	
2021 (26th)	Najla Ben Abdallah	A Son	Un fils
2021 (26th)	Nisrin Erradi	Adam	
2021 (26th)	Mélissa Guers	The Girl with a Bracelet	La Fille au bracelet
2021 (26th)	Fathia Youssouf	Cuties	Mignonnes
2022 (27th)	Agathe Rousselle	Titane	
2022 (27th)	Zbeida Belhajamor	A Story Of Love And Desire	Une histoire d'amour et de désir
2022 (27th)	Aïssatou Diallo Sagna	The Divide	La fracture
2022 (27th)	Daphné Patakia	Benedetta	
2022 (27th)	Lucie Zhang	Paris, 13th District	Les Olympiades, Paris 13e
2023 (28th)	Nadia Tereszkiewicz	Forever Young	Les Amandiers
2023 (28th)	Guslagie Malanda	Saint Omer	
2023 (28th)	Hélène Lambert	Between Two Worlds	Ouistreham
2023 (28th)	Marion Barbeau	Rise	En corps
2023 (28th)	Rebecca Marder	A Radiant Girl	Une jeune fille qui va bien
2024 (29th)	Ella Rumpf	Marguerite's Theorem	Le Théorème de Marguerite
2024 (29th)	Suzanne Jouannet	The Path of Excellence	La Voie royale
2024 (29th)	Louise Mauroy-Panzani	Àma Gloria	
2024 (29th)	Park Ji-min	Return to Seoul	Retour à Séoul
2024 (29th)	Claire Pommet	Spirit of Ecstasy	La Vénus d'argent
2025 (30th)	Ghjuvanna Benedetti	The Kingdom	Le Royaume
2025 (30th)	Maïwène Barthélemy	Holy Cow	Vingt Dieux
2025 (30th)	Malou Khebizi	Wild Diamond	Diamant brut
2025 (30th)	Clara-Maria Laredo	In His Own Image	À son image
2025 (30th)	Megan Northam	Rabia	
2026 (31st)	Nadia Melliti	The Little Sister	La Petite Dernière
2026 (31st)	Manon Clavel	Kika	
2026 (31st)	Bella Kim	Winter in Sokcho	Hiver à Sokcho
2026 (31st)	Jessica Pennington	Mektoub, My Love: Canto Due	
2026 (31st)	Anja Verderosa	Hearts on Fire	L'épreuve du feu

== See also ==
- César Award for Best Female Revelation
