= Lumière Award for Best International Co-Production =

Annual French film award

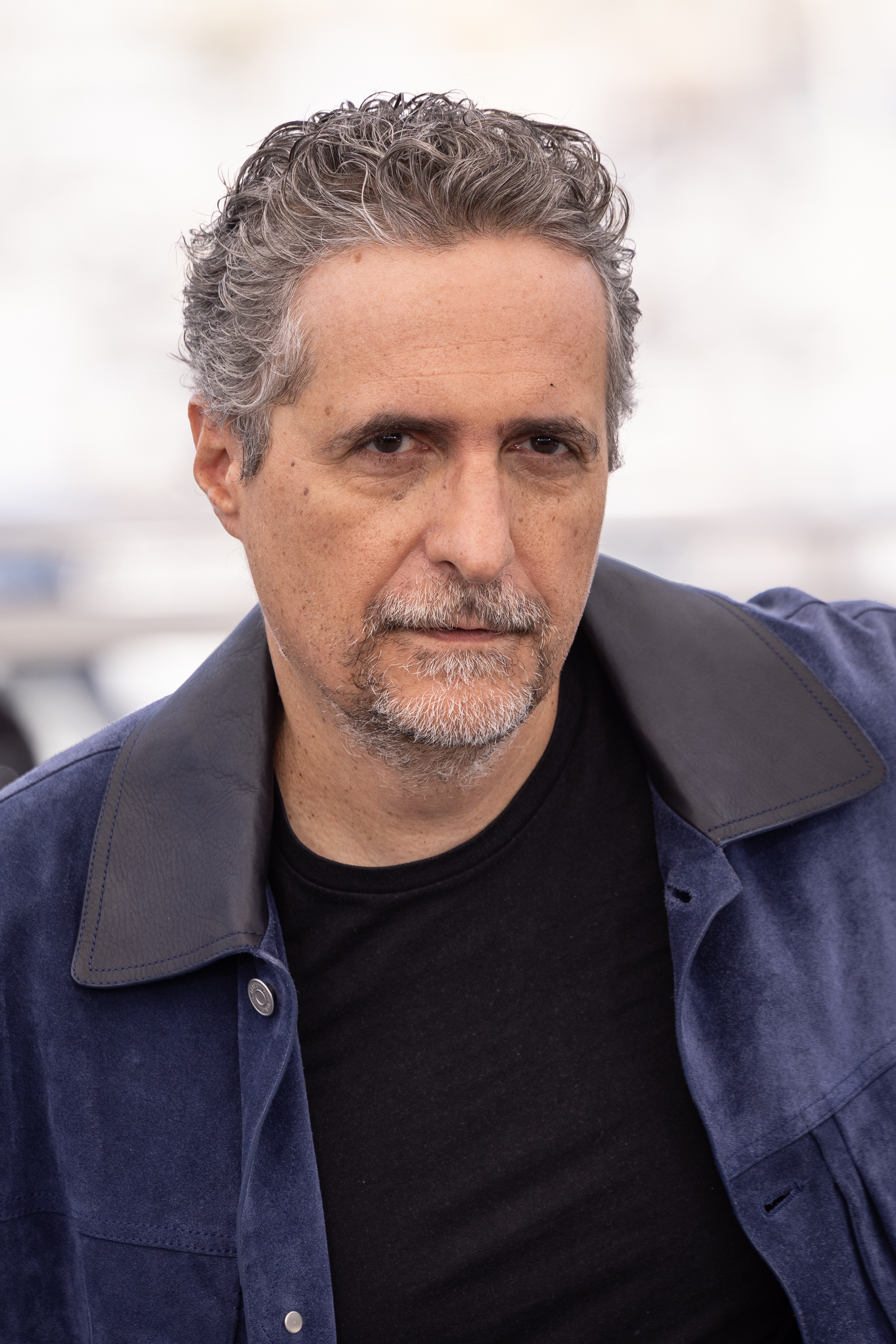
- 2026 recipient: Kleber Mendonça Filho
- Country: France
- Presented by: Académie des Lumières
- First award: 2020
- Currently held by: The Secret Agent (2026)
- Website: academiedeslumieres.com

The Lumière Award for Best International Co-Production (French: Lumière de la meilleure coproduction internationale) is an award given to an international co-production financed by a French company and released in France in the previous year. It has been presented annually by the Académie des Lumières since 2020. It replaced the Lumière Award for Best French-Language Film that was awarded from 2003 to 2019 to a French-language film made outside France.

== Criteria ==
The award is given to a film co-produced with a French contribution of at least 30% percent. It was established by the Académie des Lumières to salute the international presence of France and of French producers who make cinema possible in all parts of the world.

== Winners and nominees ==
In the following lists, the titles and names with a blue background are the winners and recipients respectively; those not in bold are the nominees.

=== 2020s ===
| Year | English title | Original title | Director(s) | Country |
|---|---|---|---|---|
| 2020 (25th) | **It Must Be Heaven** | | **Elia Suleiman** | **France, Germany, Canada, Turkey** |
| 2020 (25th) | Bacurau | | Kleber Mendonça Filho | Brazil, France |
| 2020 (25th) | Young Ahmed | Le Jeune Ahmed | Jean-Pierre Dardenne and Luc Dardenne | Belgium, France |
| 2020 (25th) | Lola | Lola vers la mer | Laurent Micheli | Belgium, France |
| 2020 (25th) | Papicha | | Mounia Meddour | France, Algeria, Belgium |
| 2021 (26th) | **The Man Who Sold His Skin** | **L'Homme qui a vendu sa peau** | **Kaouther Ben Hania** | **Tunisia, France, Belgium, Germany, Sweden, Qatar** |
| 2021 (26th) | Adam | | Maryam Touzani | Morocco, France, Belgium |
| 2021 (26th) | A Son | Un fils | Mehdi Barsaoui | Tunisia, France, Lebanon, Qatar |
| 2021 (26th) | Abou Leila | | Amin Sidi-Boumédiène | Algeria, France |
| 2021 (26th) | La Llorona | | Jayro Bustamante | Guatemala, France |
| 2021 (26th) | You Will Die at Twenty | Tu mourras à 20 ans | Amjad Abu Alala | Sudan, France, Egypt, Germany, Norway |
| 2021 (26th) | Yalda, a Night for Forgiveness | Yalda, la nuit du pardon | Massoud Bakhshi | Iran, France, Germany, Switzerland, Luxembourg, Lebanon |
| 2022 (27th) | **The Worst Person in the World** | **Julie (en 12 chapitres)** | **Joachim Trier** | **Norway, France, Denmark, Sweden** |
| 2022 (27th) | February | Février | Kamen Kalev | Bulgaria, France |
| 2022 (27th) | Petrov's Flu | La Fièvre de Petrov | Kirill Serebrennikov | Russia, Switzerland, France, Germany |
| 2022 (27th) | The Restless | Les Intranquilles | Joachim Lafosse | Belgium, Luxembourg, France |
| 2022 (27th) | The Father | | Florian Zeller | France, United Kingdom |
| 2023 (28th) | **The Beasts** | **As bestas** | **Rodrigo Sorogoyen** | **Spain, France** |
| 2023 (28th) | Boy from Heaven | La Conspiration du Caire | Tarik Saleh | Sweden, France, Finland |
| 2023 (28th) | Flee | | Jonas Poher Rasmussen | Denmark, France, Norway, Sweden, Netherlands |
| 2023 (28th) | R.M.N. | | Cristian Mungiu | Romania, France, Belgium, Sweden |
| 2023 (28th) | Zero Fucks Given | Rien à foutre | Emmanuel Marre and Julie Lecoustre | France, Belgium |
| 2024 (29th) | **About Dry Grasses** | **Les Herbes sèches** | **Nuri Bilge Ceylan** | **Turkey, France, Germany** |
| 2024 (29th) | The Blue Caftan | Le Bleu du caftan | Maryam Touzani | Morocco, France, Belgium, Denmark |
| 2024 (29th) | Hounds | Les Meutes | Kamal Lazraq | Morocco, France, Belgium |
| 2024 (29th) | Lost Country | | Vladimir Perišić | Serbia, France |
| 2024 (29th) | The Old Oak | | Ken Loach | United Kingdom, France, Belgium |
| 2025 (30th) | **The Seed of the Sacred Fig** | **Les Graines du figuier sauvage** | **Mohammad Rasoulof** | **Iran, Germany, France** |
| 2025 (30th) | Grand Tour | | Miguel Gomes | Portugal, Italy, France, Germany |
| 2025 (30th) | Green Border | | Agnieszka Holland | Poland, Czech Republic, France, Belgium |
| 2025 (30th) | The Other Way Around | Septembre sans attendre | Jonás Trueba | Spain, France |
| 2025 (30th) | Puan | El Profesor | María Alché and Benjamín Naishtat | Argentina, Italy, France, Germany, Brazil |
| 2026 (31st) | **The Secret Agent** | **O Agente Secreto** | **Kleber Mendonça Filho** | **Brazil, France, Germany, Netherlands** |
| 2026 (31st) | Afternoons of Solitude | Tardes de soledad | Albert Serra | Spain, Portugal, France |
| 2026 (31st) | It Was Just an Accident | یک تصادف ساده | Jafar Panahi | Iran, France, Luxembourg |
| 2026 (31st) | Sentimental Value | Affeksjonsverdi | Joachim Trier | Norway, France, Germany, Denmark, Sweden, United Kingdom |
| 2026 (31st) | The Voice of Hind Rajab | صوت هند رجب | Kaouther Ben Hania | Tunisia, France |

== See also ==
- César Award for Best Foreign Film
- Magritte Award for Best Foreign Film in Coproduction
- Academy Award for Best International Feature Film
