= The Girl with a Bracelet =

2019 courtroom drama film

- Theatrical release poster
- French: La Fille au bracelet
- Directed by: Stéphane Demoustier
- Written by: Stéphane Demoustier
- Based on: The Accused by: Ulises Porra; Gonzalo Tobal
- Produced by: Jean des Forêts
- Starring: Roschdy Zem; Mélissa Guers; Anaïs Demoustier; Chiara Mastroianni
- Cinematography: Sylvain Verdet
- Edited by: Damien Maestraggi
- Music by: Carla Pallone
- Production companies: Petit Film; Frakas Productions; France 3 Cinéma
- Distributed by: Le Pacte
- Release dates: 8 August 2019 (Locarno); 20 August 2019 (Angoulême); 12 February 2020 (France)
- Running time: 95 minutes
- Countries: France; Belgium
- Language: French
- Box office: $2.6 million

The Girl with a Bracelet (French: La Fille au bracelet) is a 2019 mystery drama film written and directed by Stéphane Demoustier. It is a co-production between France and Belgium. It is a remake of the 2018 Argentine film The Accused. The film stars Roschdy Zem, Anaïs Demoustier, Mélissa Guers and Chiara Mastroianni. The film had its world premiere at the 72nd Locarno Film Festival on 8 August 2019, and was released in France by Le Pacte on 12 February 2020.

== Premise ==
A teenager stands trial for murdering her best friend.

== Cast ==
- Roschdy Zem as Bruno Bataille
- Mélissa Guers as Lise Bataille
- Anaïs Demoustier as Avocate Générale
- Chiara Mastroianni as Céline Bataille
- Annie Mercier as Lise's lawyer
- Paul Aïssaoui-Cuvelier as Jules Bataille
- Pascal-Pierre Garbarini as court president

== Production ==
The film was produced by Jean des Forêts at Petit Film, in co-production with Frakas Productions (Belgium) and France 3 Cinéma.

Filming took place over 32 days between January and March 2018 in the Loire-Atlantique department. The trial scenes were shot at the courthouse of Nantes. The short opening scene on the beach was shot at La Bernerie-en-Retz.

== Release ==
The Girl with a Bracelet was selected to be screened in the Piazza Grande section at the 72nd Locarno Film Festival, where it had its world premiere on 8 August 2019. The film was also screened at the 12th Angoulême Francophone Film Festival on 20 August 2019. The film was theatrically released in France by Le Pacte on 12 February 2020.

== Reception ==
=== Box office ===
The Girl with a Bracelet grossed $2.5 million in France, and $56,604 in Italy, for a worldwide total of $2.6 million.

In France, the film opened alongside Sonic the Hedgehog, Le Prince oublié, Fantasy Island, Arab Blues, Queen & Slim, and Two of Us. The film sold 23,158 admissions on its first day, 7,591 of which were preview screenings. It went on to sell 109,257 admissions in its opening weekend, finishing 10th at the box office, behind Sonic the Hedgehog, Le Prince oublié, Ducobu 3, Dolittle, Birds of Prey, 1917, Fantasy Island, Bad Boys for Life, and The Gentlemen. At the end of its theatrical run, the film sold a total of 324,250 admissions.

=== Critical response ===
The Girl with a Bracelet received an average rating of 3.8 out of 5 stars on the French website AlloCiné, based on 33 reviews. On Rotten Tomatoes, the film holds an approval rating of 90% based on 20 reviews, with an average rating of 7.0/10. On Metacritic, the film has a weighted average score of 73 out of 100, based on 6 critic reviews, indicating "generally favorable reviews".

=== Accolades ===
Award	Date of ceremony	Category	Recipient(s)	Result	Ref.
César Awards	12 March 2021	Best Adaptation	Stéphane Demoustier	Won	
César Awards	12 March 2021	Most Promising Actress	Mélissa Guers	Nominated	
Lumière Awards	19 January 2021	Best Screenplay	Stéphane Demoustier	Won	
Lumière Awards	19 January 2021	Best Film	Stéphane Demoustier	Nominated	
Lumière Awards	19 January 2021	Best Female Revelation	Mélissa Guers	Nominated	
