= Najla Ben Abdallah =

Tunisian model and actress

- نجلاء بن عبد الله
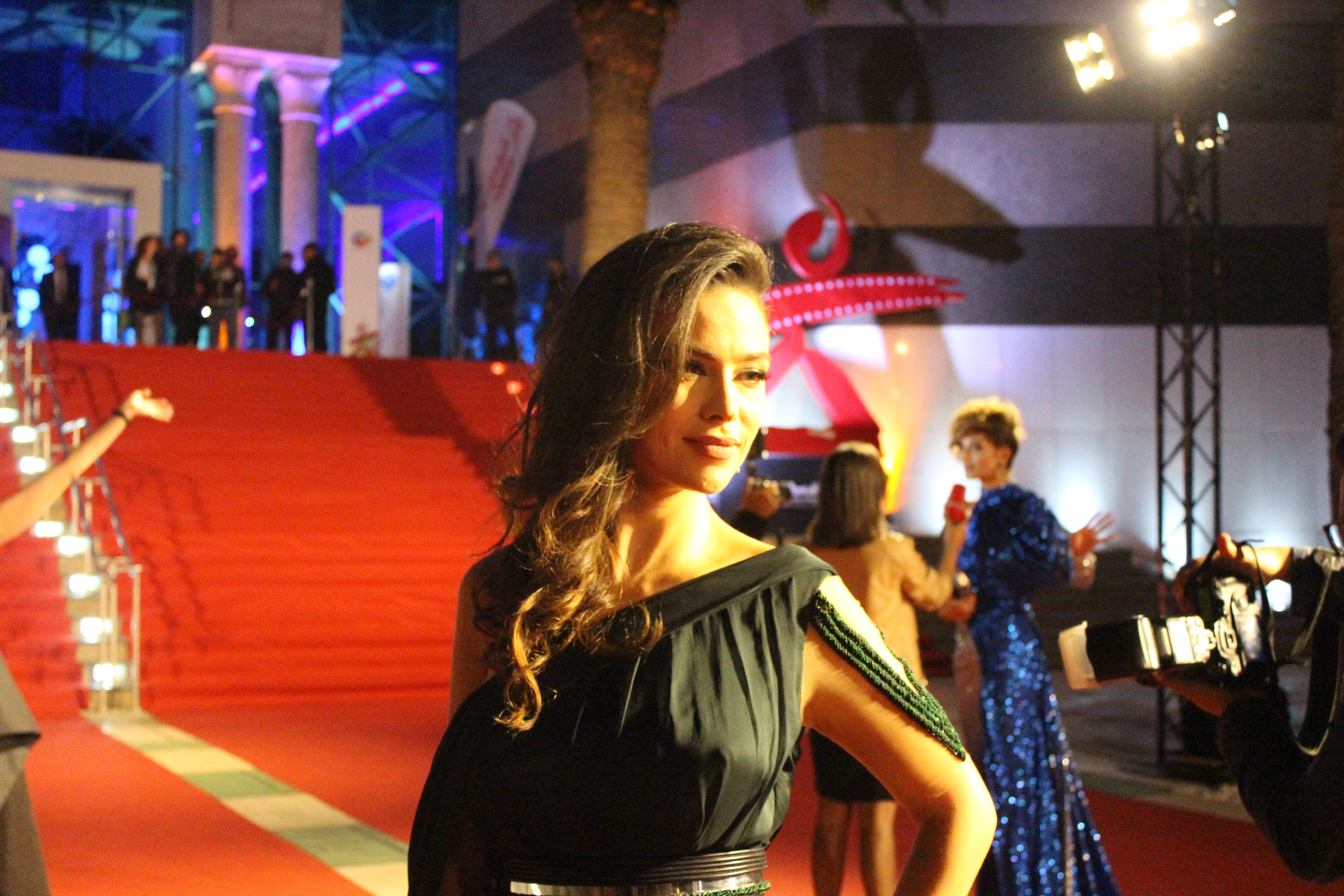
- Najla Ben Abdallah at the opening of Carthage Cinematographic Days 2018.
- Born: June 16, 1980 (age 45); Tunisia
- Occupations: Actress model flight attendant
- Years active: 2009–present
- Awards: Golden Orange International Film Competition Best Actress Award

Najla Ben Abdallah (Arabic: نجلاء بن عبد الله, born 16 June 1980) is a Tunisian actress, model and flight attendant who is known for her role as Feriel in the popular Tunisian series Maktoub (Destiny). She has also appeared in films including Mehdi M. Barsaoui's film Un fils (A Son).

== Biography ==
Ben Abdallah was born on 16 June 1980 in Tunis. She is a flight attendant for the Tunisair airline. She is an ambassador of several products.

In 2009, She started her career with advertisements. Najla tried her first chance in a Ramadan soap opera called Donia alongside Nadia Boussetta. Her first cinematic role is that of Lilly in "False Note".

In 2012, she made the cover of the people magazine Tunivisions, then that of the Tunisian magazine E-young in November.

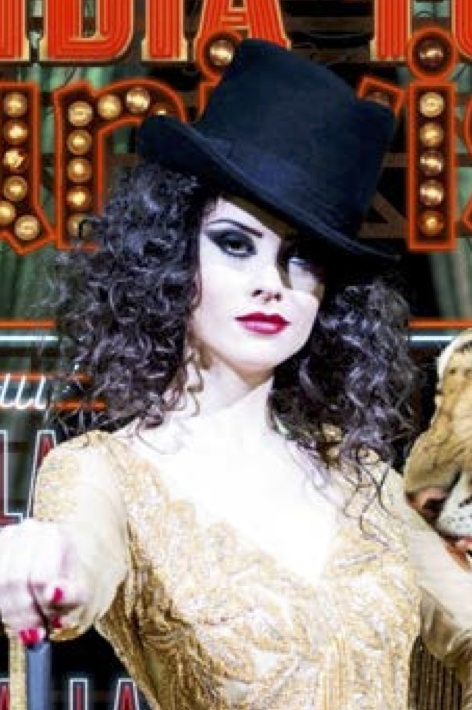
Najla Ben Abdallah on the August 2012 cover of Tunivisions

In 2015, Ben Abdallah played the part of Hourya in Mehdi Hmili's film "Thala mon amour" with Ghanem Zrelli.

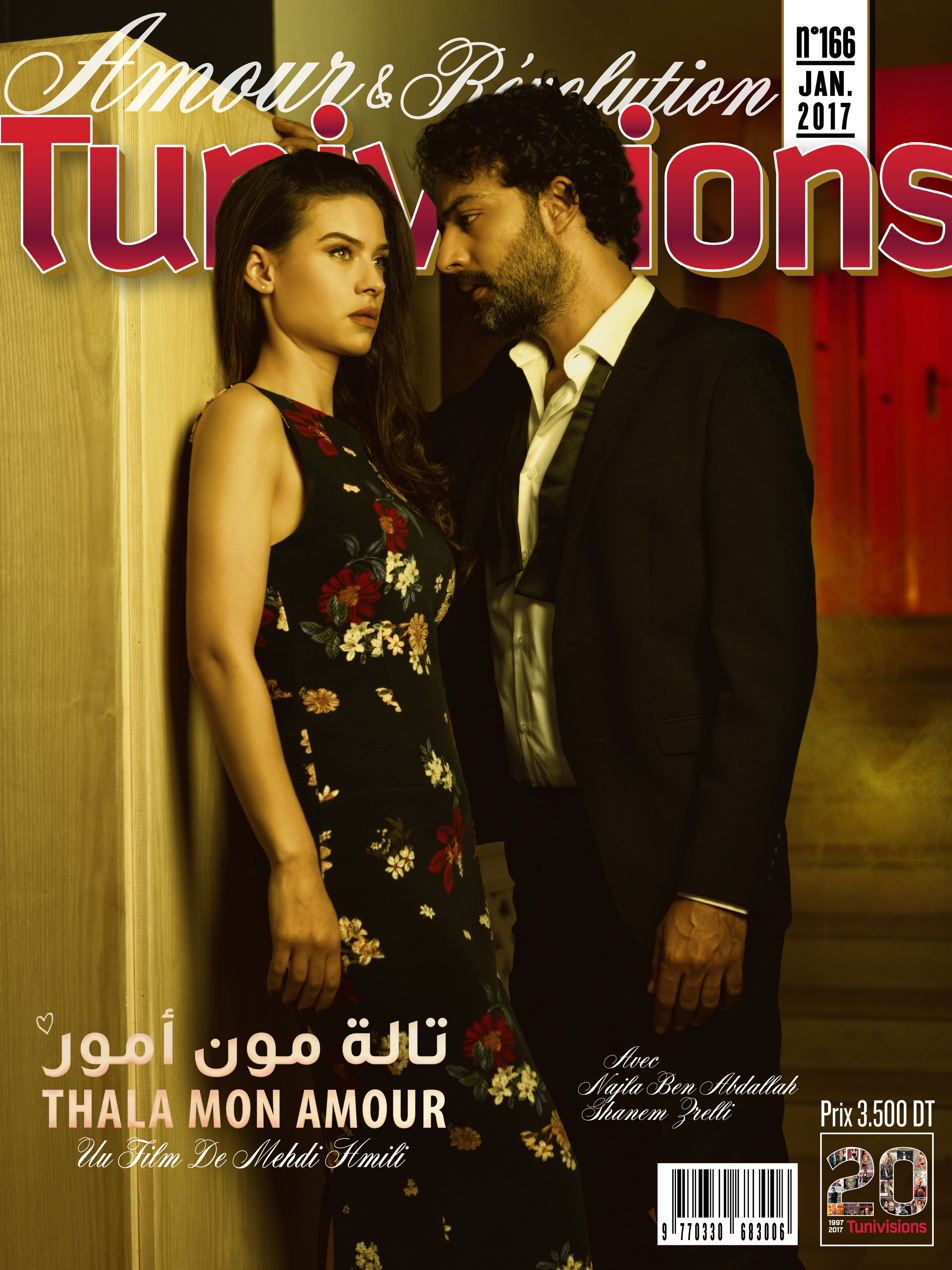
Najla Ben Abdallah on the January 2017 cover of Tunivisions with Ghanem Zrelli

In 2017, The actress participated this year in "Bolice 4" series, She also participated in a Libyan soap opera, the filmmaking place in Tunisia for security reasons.

In 2019, Najla Ben Abdallah played a major supporting role of Un fils film with Sami Bouajila, film was awarded at the 2019 Cairo International Film Festival . It had been the film of the Horizons of Arab Cinema competition, in gala projection which was attended, in addition to the director Mehdi M. Barsaoui, the producer Habib Attia and the president of CIFF Mohamed Hefzy, several actors and professionals of Egyptian and foreign cinema and a large audience came to discover this Tunisian film. This film won several prestigious awards, notably at the HAMBURG Film Festival, the Cairo International Film Festival, the International Francophone Film Festival of NAMUR, the CINEMAMED Brussels, the TOZEUR International Film Festival and several other festivals. The members of the various juries which awarded him three prizes: the Special Jury Prize Salah Abou Seif, the UNFPA Prize and the Prize for the best Arab film.

In 2020, she won the award for best actress at the Malmö Arab Film Festival, for her role in the film Un Fils in English " A Son", a film written and directed by Mehdi Barsaoui, won the best award of the 10th edition of the Film Festival Arabic from Malmö (MAFF in Sweden). She has been chosen by the César Academy to be part of the "César for Most Promising Actress 2021" category for her role in the film "A Son", which has so far won around 30 international awards.

== Personal life ==
She is mother of two daughters. In 2020, she affirmed, as a mother, that she greatly values fatherhood.

== Filmography ==
=== short film ===
- 2010: Gold Parodies by Majdi Smiri
- 2013: Whatever by Ismahane Lahmar: As Neila

=== Film ===
- 2012: False Note by Majdi Smiri: As Lilly
- 2012: Barabbas by Roger Young: Ester's Friend
- 2015: Thala Mon Amour (Thala My Love) by Mehdi Hmili: Houriya
- 2019: A Son by Mehdi M. Barsaoui: Maryem Ben Youssef

=== Television ===
==== TV serials ====
- 2010: Nsibti Laaziza (Guest of honor of episode 12 of season 1) by Slaheddine Essid: Sawssen
- 2010: Donia by Naim Ben Rhouma
- 2012–2014: Destiny (Maktoub) (Seasons 3–4) by Sami Fehri: As Feriel Ben Abdallah
- 2013: The Fifth Wife by Habib Mselmani: Rym Sissawi
- 2014: School by Zied Letaiem and Rania Gabsi (season 1): Substitute Teacher
- 2015: Naouret El Hawa (season 2) by Madih Belaid: As Nahed
- 2015: Dar Ellozab by Lassaad Oueslati: Honor Guest
- 2015: Ambulance by Lassaad Oueslati: As Siwar
- 2015: Sultan Achour 10 by Djaffar Gacem: As Cleopatra
- 2016: Noss Yum (Syrian TV-Serial) (Half A Day) by Samer Barqawi
- 2016: Al Akaber by Madih Belaid: Hend
- 2016: Embouteillage (Traffic Jam) by Walid Tayaa: Honor Guest
- 2017: The Hairdresser by Zied Letaiem: Honor Guest
- 2018: Téj El Hadhra by Sami Fehri: Lella Hsseyna
- 2019: Awled Moufida 4 (The Sons of Moufida) by Sami Fehri: Najla The Attorney
- 2019: The Kingdoms of Fire by Alejandro Toledo and Peter Webber: Triviana
- 2019: Wind Alley (Zanket Errih) by Osama Resk: Lwiza
- 2020: Awled Moufida 5 (Awled Moufida) by Sami Fehri: Najla The Attorney
- 2022 : Baraa by Sami Fehri
- 2023 : Djebel Lahmar by Rabii Tekali: Samia

=== TV Movies ===
- 2012: The Escape From Carthage by Madih Belaïd

=== TV shows ===
- 2012: Labes (We are Fine) on Ettounsia TV
- 2012: Klem Ennes (The People's Talk) on El Hiwar El Tounsi
- 2013: Dhouk Tohsel (Take a Bite you will be compromised) (Episode 15) on Tunisna TV
- 2014: Dhawakna (Take a Bite) (Episode 5) on Telvza TV
- 2014: L'anglizi (The English) (Episode 10) on Tunisna TV
- 2016: Tahadi El Chef (The Chef Challenge) (Episode 3) on M Tunisia
- 2017: 100 Façons (100 Ways) on Attessia TV
- 2018: Fekret Sami Fehri (The Idea of Sami Fehri) on El Hiwar El Tounsi
- 2018: Labes on El Hiwar El Tounsi
- 2018: Dimanche Tout Est Permis (In Sunday Everything is Allowed) (Tunisia) on El Hiwar El Tounsi
- 2019: Dima Labes (We are Always Fine) on Attessia TV
- 2020: 90 Minutes on El Hiwar El Tounsi

=== Videos ===
- 2011: Advertising spot for the chain of supermarkets Magasin général
- 2011: Advertising spot for Tunisiana
- 2011: Advertising spots for dessert cream Danette de Danone
- 2018: POINT M perfumeries: brand ambassador

== Awards ==
- Golden Orange International Film Competition Best Actress Award.
- Best actress 2020 at the Malmö Arab Film Festival
