= 31st Lumière Awards =

2026 French film awards ceremony

- Date: 18 January 2026
- Site: Institut du Monde Arabe, Paris
- Hosted by: Eve Jackson; Pascal Thoreau

Highlights
- Best Film: The Stranger
- Best Actor: Benjamin Voisin; The Stranger
- Best Actress: Léa Drucker; Case 137
- Most awards: The Stranger (3)
- Most nominations: The Stranger (6)

The 31st Lumière Awards ceremony, presented by the Académie des Lumières, took place on 18 January 2026 to honour the best in French-speaking cinema of 2025.

The Stranger led the nominations with six, followed by Nouvelle Vague with five. The Stranger won the most awards with three prizes, including Best Film.

== Winners and nominees ==
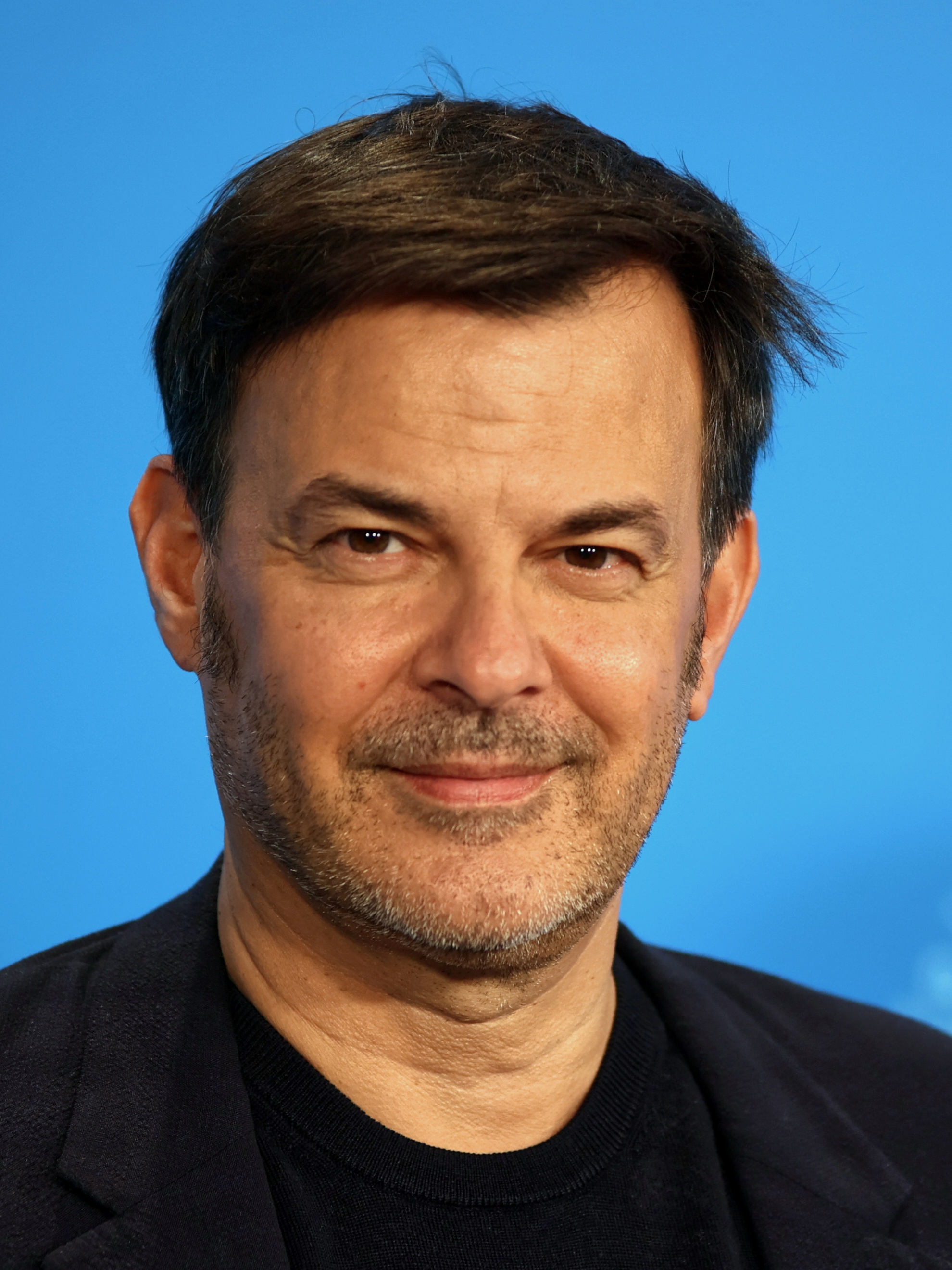
François Ozon, Best Film winner

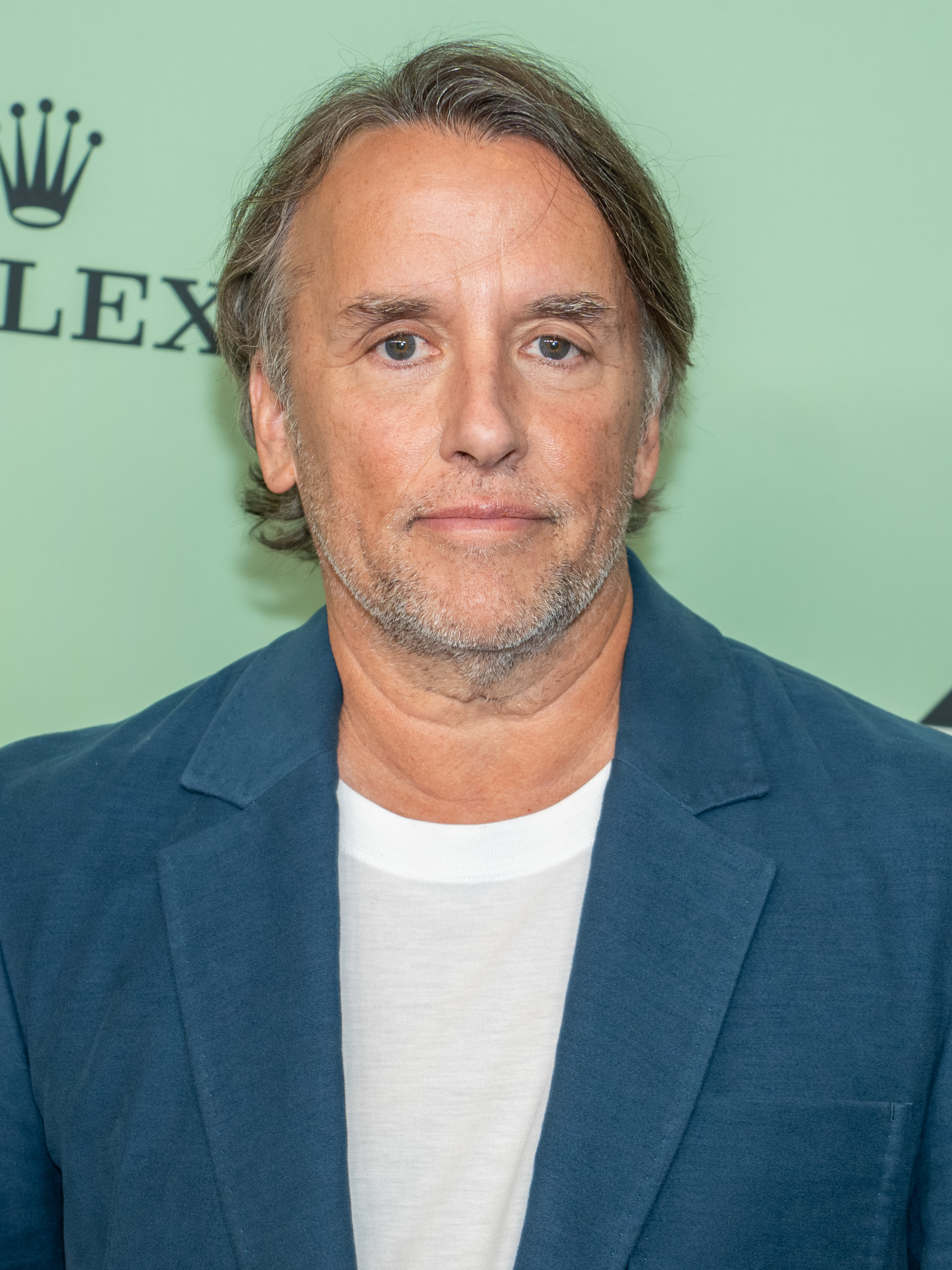
Richard Linklater, Best Director winner

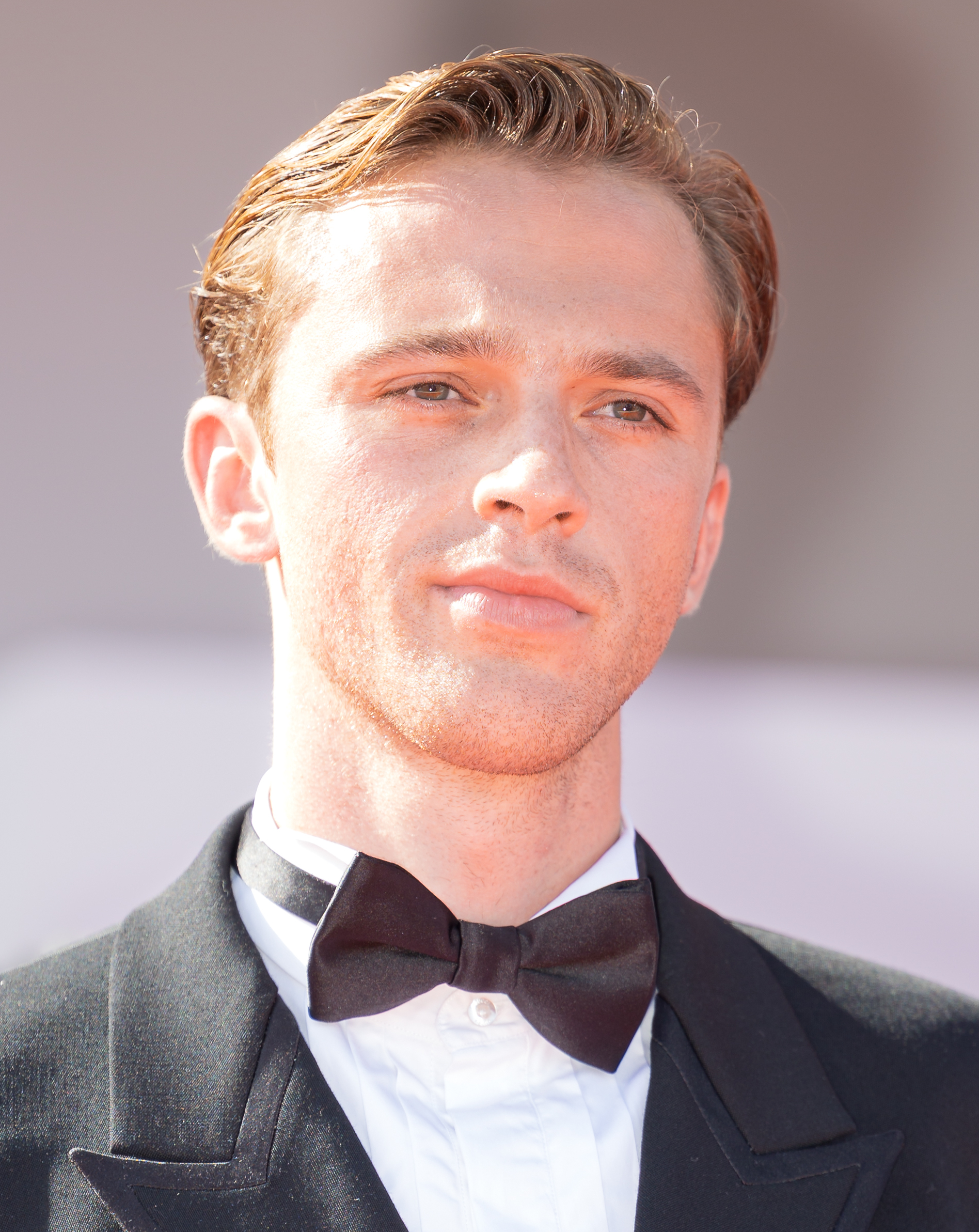
Benjamin Voisin, Best Actor winner

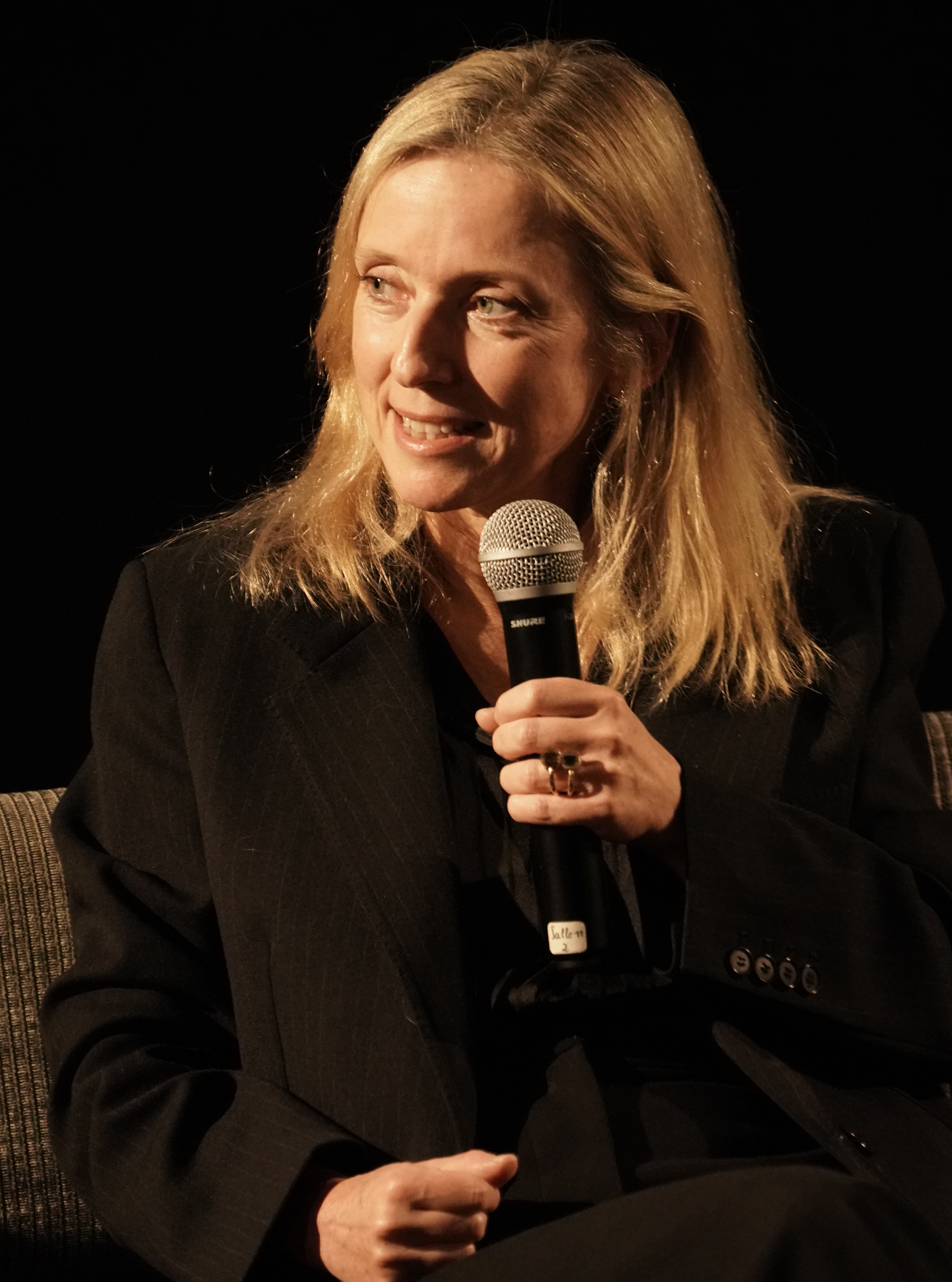
Léa Drucker, Best Actress winner

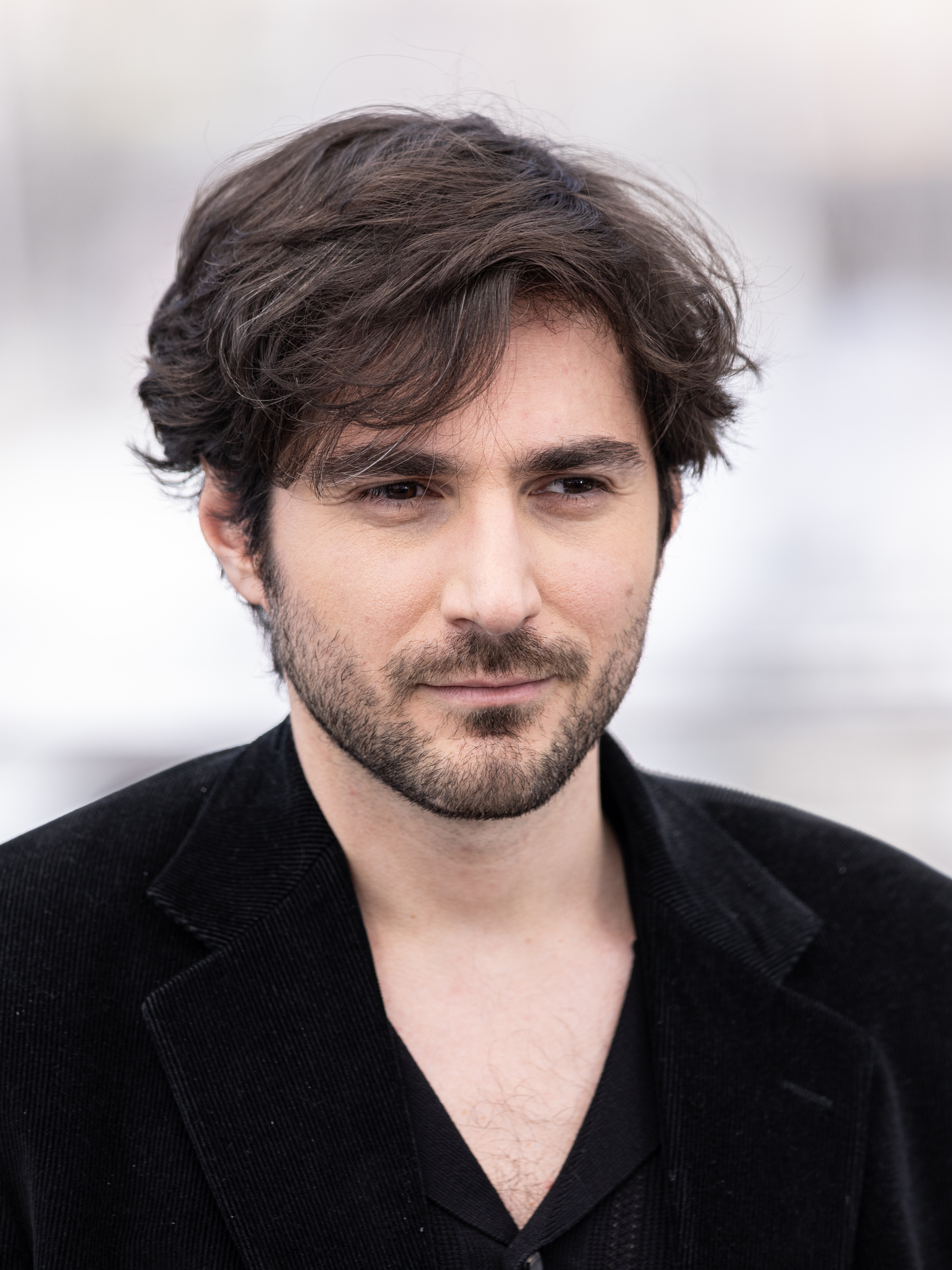
Guillaume Marbeck, Best Male Revelation winner

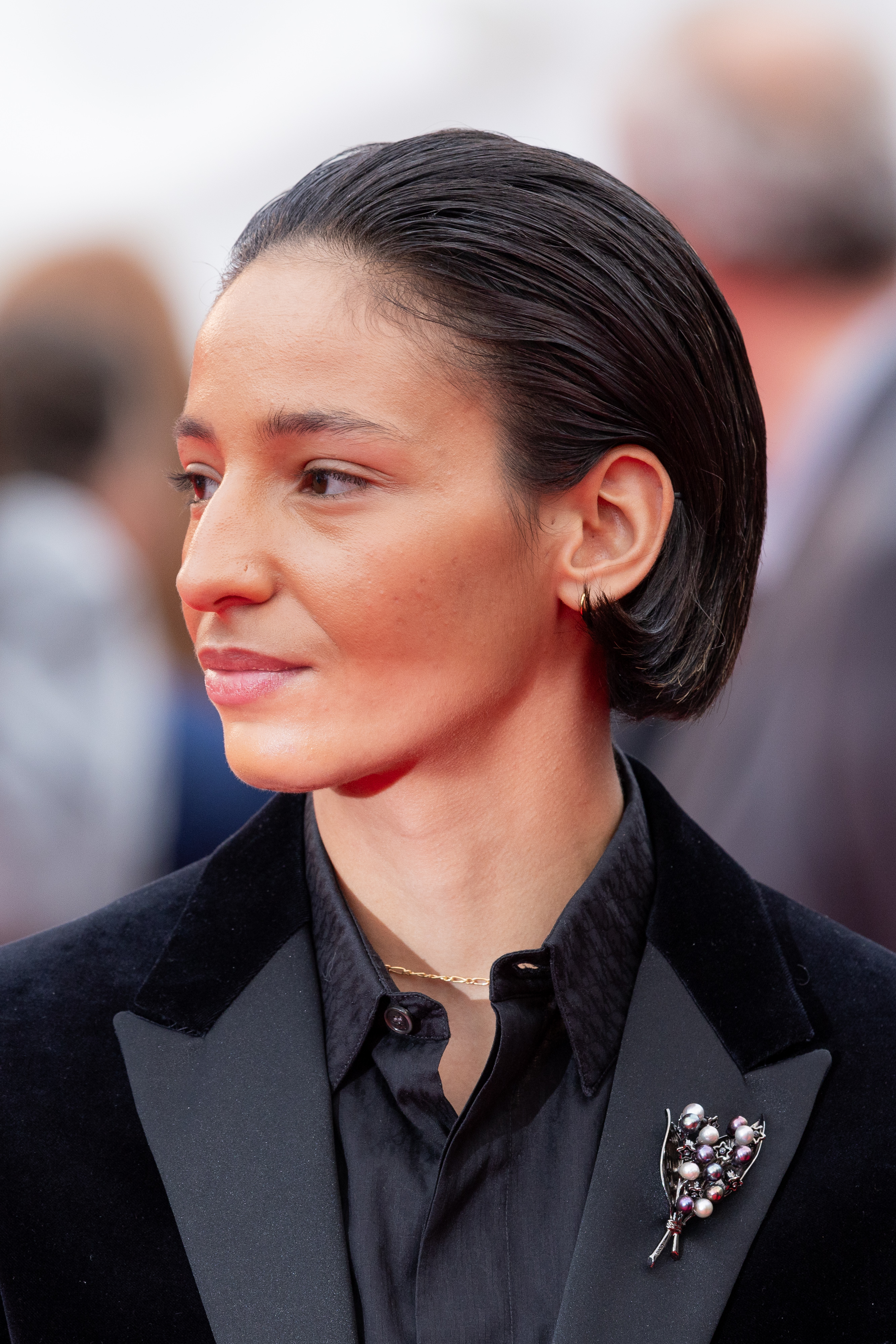
Nadia Melliti, Best Female Revelation winner

The nominations were announced on 12 December 2025. Winners are listed first, highlighted in boldface:

**Best Film**: **The Stranger – François Ozon**; Case 137 – Dominik Moll; The Great Arch – Stéphane Demoustier; Mektoub, My Love: Canto Due – Abdellatif Kechiche; Nouvelle Vague – Richard Linklater	**Best Director**: **Richard Linklater – Nouvelle Vague**; Stéphane Demoustier – The Great Arch; Abdellatif Kechiche – Mektoub, My Love: Canto Due; Dominik Moll – Case 137; François Ozon – The Stranger
**Best Actor**: **Benjamin Voisin – The Stranger as Meursault**; Swann Arlaud – La Condition as André de Boisvaillant; Claes Bang – The Great Arch as Otto von Spreckelsen; Laurent Lafitte – The Richest Woman in the World as Pierre-Alain Fantin; Alexis Manenti – The Mohican as Joseph Cardelli	**Best Actress**: **Léa Drucker – Case 137 as Stéphanie Bertrand**; Jodie Foster – A Private Life as Lilian Steiner; Isabelle Huppert – The Richest Woman in the World as Marianne Farrère; Vicky Krieps – Love Me Tender as Clémence; Mélanie Thierry – Mariana's Room as Mariana
**Best Male Revelation**: **Guillaume Marbeck – Nouvelle Vague as Jean-Luc Godard**; Idir Azougli – Meteors as Daniel Mezziani; Younès Boucif – La Petite Cuisine De Mehdi as Mehdi; Théodore Pellerin – Nino as Nino; Eloy Pohu – Enzo as Enzo	**Best Female Revelation**: **Nadia Melliti – The Little Sister as Fatima**; Manon Clavel – Kika as Kika; Bella Kim – Winter in Sokcho as Sooha; Jessica Pennington – Mektoub, My Love: Canto Due as Jessica Patterson; Anja Verderosa – Hearts on Fire as Queen
**Best First Film**: **Nino – Pauline Loquès**; Block Pass – Antoine Chevrollier; The Girl in the Snow – Louise Hémon; Little Jaffna – Lawrence Valin; That Summer in Paris – Valentine Cadic	**Best Screenplay**: **Stéphane Demoustier – The Great Arch**; Holly Gent, Vince Palmo and Michèle Halberstadt – Nouvelle Vague; Pauline Loquès – Nino; Dominik Moll and Gilles Marchand – Case 137; François Ozon – The Stranger
**Best Cinematography**: **Manuel Dacosse – The Stranger**; Marine Atlan – The Girl in the Snow; David Chambille – Nouvelle Vague; Pascal Lagriffoul – The Condition; Vincent Munier, Antoine Lavorel and Laurent Joffrion – Whispers in the Woods	**Best Music**: **Warren Ellis, Dom La Nena and Rosemary Standley – Whispers in the Woods**; Fatima Al Qadiri – The Stranger; Amine Bouhafa – The Little Sister; Robin Rob Coudert – A Private Life; Arnaud Toulon – Arco
**Best Documentary**: **Put Your Soul on Your Hand and Walk – Sepideh Farsi**; Lumière!, The Adventure Continues – Thierry Frémaux; Sarkozy – Gaddafi: the Scandal of Scandals – Yannick Kergoat; Tell Her That I Love Her – Romane Bohringer; Whispers in the Woods – Vincent Munier	**Best Animated Film**: **Arco – Ugo Bienvenu**; A Boat In The Garden – Jean-François Laguionie; A Magnificent Life – Sylvain Chomet; Little Amélie or the Character of Rain – Liane-Cho Han and Mailys Vallade; My Life In Versailles – Nathaniel H'Limi and Clémence Madeleine-Perdrillat
**Best International Co-Production**: **The Secret Agent – Kleber Mendonça Filho**; Afternoons of Solitude – Albert Serra; It Was Just an Accident – Jafar Panahi; Sentimental Value – Joachim Trier; The Voice of Hind Rajab – Kaouther Ben Hania

=== Films with multiple nominations and awards ===
Films with multiple nominations
Nominations	Film
6	The Stranger
5	Nouvelle Vague
4	Case 137
4	The Great Arch
3	Mektoub, My Love: Canto Due
2	Nino
2	The Girl in the Snow
2	Whispers in the Woods

Films with multiple wins
Wins	Film
3	The Stranger
2	Nouvelle Vague

== See also ==
- 98th Academy Awards
- 79th British Academy Film Awards
- 51st César Awards
- 71st David di Donatello
- 38th European Film Awards
- 83rd Golden Globe Awards
- 40th Goya Awards
- 15th Magritte Awards
