= 475: Break the Silence =

2013 Moroccan documentary film

- Directed by: Hind Bensari
- Written by: Hind Bensari
- Cinematography: Raja Saddiki
- Edited by: Julia Sukan Del Rio
- Music by: Raja Saddiki
- Release date: 2013
- Running time: 47 min.
- Country: Morocco
- Language: Arabic

475: Break the Silence, (Original title: 475: Trenquem el Silenci) is a 2013 Moroccan documentary short film directed by Hind Bensari. The film focused on the life of Amina Fillali, a 16-year-old girl from a small town in Morocco. She committed suicide by taking rat poison after she married the man who raped her. It was premiered at International Human Rights Documentary Film Festival in 2014.

The film received positive reviews and won several awards at international film festivals. It has contributed to a movement in Morocco to establish a new law that allowed men accused of rape to marry their victims. The film won critical acclaim from the New York Times and Germany's ARD channel as well as was an internet sensation. It also broke the audience record at 2M TV in Morocco and broadcast in other countries including Denmark, Portugal, Canada and sold for more than 20 worldwide channels.

== Synopsis ==
Based on the death of a sixteen year old called Amina Filali. Filali killed herself after she was forced to marry her rapist. This moved Hind Bensari to investigate the misrepresentation of rape in Morocco.This investigation has led to the liberation of victims' voices, gave audience to view of family, relationships, and arranged marriage, the repeal of law that made rape victims to marry their rapists.
