= Aïcha (film) =

2024 drama film

- Directed by: Mehdi Barsaoui
- Written by: Mehdi Barsaoui
- Produced by: Mohamed Habib Attia; Marc Irmer
- Starring: Fatma Sfar
- Cinematography: Antoine Héberlé
- Edited by: Camille Toubkis
- Music by: Amin Bouhafa
- Release date: September 5, 2024 (Venice)
- Language: Arabic

Aïcha is a 2024 drama film written and directed by Mehdi Barsaoui. A co-production between Tunisia, France, Italy, Saudi Arabia and Qatar, the film premiered at the 81st edition of the Venice Film Festival.

== Plot ==
Aya Dhaoui leads a life of relative servitude in the Southern Tunisian region of Tozeur. Working as a cleaner in a resort hotel, she is expected to hand over all of her wages to her mother and father. But after a freak accident she has a chance to change all of that by assuming a new identity. But freedom in her new life in constrained by the problems of her lack of identity.

== Cast ==
- Fatma Sfar as Aya Dhaoui
- Nidhal Saadi as Farès
- Yasmine Dimassi as Lobna
- Badis Galaoui as Nouri

== Production ==
The film was produced by Cinetelefilms and Dolce Vita Films, with 13 Prods, Dorje Films, Sunnyland Films and Cinemawaves Films serving as co-producers. It is loosely based on real events.

== Release ==
The film had its world premiere at the 81st Venice International Film Festival in the Orizzonti sidebar. It was later screened at the BFI London Film Festival. It was released in French cinemas on 19 March 2025.

== Reception ==
Screen International's film critic Fionnuala Halligan praised the performance of Fatma Sfar, and wrote that "undoubtedly set for success in Middle-Eastern markets, where it will court a younger audience with similar dreams of liberation, it may be too blunt for arthouse markets elsewhere". Connor Lightbody from Next Best Picture described the film as "an exciting character study that shows how women, even in death, are the currency of men and government, no matter their supposed freedom".
