= We Could Be Heroes =

2018 Moroccan documentary sports film

- Directed by: Hind Bensari
- Written by: Hind Bensari
- Produced by: Bullitt Films
- Starring: Azeddine Nouiri
- Cinematography: Sofie Steenberger
- Edited by: Lilia Sellami
- Music by: Tin Soheili
- Production company: Cinetele Films
- Release date: 2 May 2018
- Running time: 79 minutes
- Country: Morocco
- Language: Arabic

We Could Be Heroes is a 2018 Moroccan documentary sport film directed by Hind Bensari and produced by Habib Attia and Vibeke Vogel for Bullitt Films. The film focused on the life of Paralympic shot put champion and his childhood friend Youssef.

The film premiered on 2 May 2018 at the Scotiabank Theatre. The film received positive reviews and won several awards at international film festivals.

The film won the Best International Feature Documentary award at the Hot Docs Canadian International Documentary Festival. The film won Grand Prix at the Tangier National Film Festival.

== Cast ==
- Azeddine Nouiri
