= The Little Sister (2025 film) =

2025 film by Hafsia Herzi

- Theatrical release poster
- French: La Petite Dernière
- Literally: The Little Last One
- Directed by: Hafsia Herzi
- Screenplay by: Hafsia Herzi
- Based on: The Last One by Fatima Daas
- Produced by: Julie Billy; Naomi Denamur
- Starring: Nadia Melliti; Park Ji-min; Amina Ben Mohamed; Rita Benmannana; Melissa Guers
- Cinematography: Jérémie Attard
- Edited by: Géraldine Mangenot
- Music by: Amine Bouhafa
- Production companies: June Films; Katuh Studio; Arte France Cinéma; ZDF/ARTE; MK Productions; MK2 Films
- Distributed by: Ad Vitam
- Release dates: 16 May 2025 (Cannes); 22 October 2025 (France)
- Running time: 106 minutes
- Countries: France; Germany
- Language: French
- Box office: $2.6 million

The Little Sister (French: La Petite Dernière, lit. 'The Little Last One') is a 2025 coming-of-age drama film written and directed by Hafsia Herzi. It is an adaptation of Fatima Daas's 2020 autofiction novel The Last One. It follows Fatima (Nadia Melliti) a young lesbian descendant of Algerian immigrants in Paris, who struggles to balance the expectations of her Muslim family. The supporting cast includes Park Ji-min, Louis Memmi, Mouna Soualem, and several non-professional actors. The film is a co-production between France and Germany.

The film had its world premiere at the main competition of the 78th Cannes Film Festival on 16 May 2025, where it won the Queer Palm and the Best Actress prize. It was theatrically released in France on 22 October by Ad Vitam. It received seven nominations at the 51st César Awards, winning Best Female Revelation (for Nadia Melliti).

== Synopsis ==
Fatima, 17, is the youngest of three daughters in a French-Algerian family. Wanting to find her own path in life, she begins university studies in Paris, where she embraces new experiences. She struggles to develop her identity and balance emerging desires, including her attraction to women, while also maintaining a sense of loyalty to her family.

== Cast ==
- Nadia Melliti as Fatima
- Park Ji-min as Ji-Na
- Amina Ben Mohamed as Kamar
- Rita Benmannana as Dounia
- Melissa Guers as Nour
- Razzak Ridha as Ahmed
- Louis Memmi as Benjamin
- Anouar Kardellas as Nacer
- Joven Etienne as Joven
- Waniss Chaouki as Tarik
- Madi Dembele as Madi
- Mahamadou Sacko as Rayan
- Ahmed Kheloufi as Adel
- Pascal Chanez as Professor Prévost
- Sophie Garagnon as Ingrid
- Julia Muller as Aurélia
- Nemo Schiffman as Yann
- Victorien Bonnet as Hugo
- Vincent Pasdermadjian as Vincent
- Gabriel Donzelli as Nino
- Mouna Soualem as Cassandra
- Jade Fehlmann as Jade
- Gioia Farisano as Gabrielle
- Julie Chaintron as high school teacher
- Ahmet Insel as university professor
- Abdelali Mamoun as Imam
- Claude-Emmanuelle Gajan-Maull as Claude DJ

== Production ==
The Little Sister is Hafsia Herzi's third feature-length film, following her Critics' Week debut feature You Deserve a Lover (2019) and her Un Certain Regard prize-winner Good Mother (2021). Herzi wrote the screenplay, which she adapted from Fatima Daas's debut novel The Last One (French: La Petite Dernière), which follows the life of a young Muslim woman as she explores her sexuality, religion, and relationships while living in Clichy-sous-Bois, a suburb of Paris. Daas described the novel as a work of autofiction as the life of the main character, who is also named Fatima Daas, parallels Daas' own.

The film was produced by Julie Billy and Naomi Denamur for June Films, in co-production with Arte France Cinéma and Germany's Katuh Studio.

== Release ==
The Little Sister was selected to compete for the Palme d'Or at the 78th Cannes Film Festival, where it had its world premiere on 16 May 2025.

International sales are handled by mk2 Films. The film was theatrically released in France by Ad Vitam on 22 October 2025.

== Reception ==
=== Critical response ===
On the review aggregator website Rotten Tomatoes, 86% of 42 critics' reviews are positive, with an average rating of 6.8/10. The website's consensus reads: "The Little Sister is a restrained yet powerful coming-of-age drama, elevated by Nadia Melliti's standout performance and an empathetic directorial touch that makes its familiar themes feel deeply personal." On Metacritic, the film has a weighted average score of 71 out of 100 based on 14 critics, which the site labels as "generally favorable" reviews.

=== Accolades ===
Award	Date of ceremony	Category	Recipient(s)	Result	Ref.
Cannes Film Festival	24 May 2025	Palme d'Or	Hafsia Herzi	Nominated	
Cannes Film Festival	24 May 2025	Queer Palm	Hafsia Herzi	Won	
Cannes Film Festival	24 May 2025	Best Actress	Nadia Melliti	Won	
César Awards	26 February 2026	Best Film	The Little Sister	Nominated	
César Awards	26 February 2026	Best Director	Hafsia Herzi	Nominated	
César Awards	26 February 2026	Best Supporting Actress	Park Ji-min	Nominated	
César Awards	26 February 2026	Best Female Revelation	Nadia Melliti	Won	
César Awards	26 February 2026	Best Adaptation	Hafsia Herzi	Nominated	
César Awards	26 February 2026	Best Editing	Géraldine Mangenot	Nominated	
César Awards	26 February 2026	Best Original Music	Amine Bouhafa	Nominated	
Lumière Awards	18 January 2026	Best Female Revelation	Nadia Melliti	Won	
Lumière Awards	18 January 2026	Best Music	Amine Bouhafa	Nominated	
Tromsø International Film Festival	25 January 2026	Faith in Film Special Mention	The Little Sister	Won	
