= Just to Be Sure =

2017 film

- Film poster
- Directed by: Carine Tardieu
- Written by: Carine Tardieu
- Produced by: Fabrice Goldstein
- Starring: François Damiens; Cécile De France
- Cinematography: Pierre Cottereau
- Edited by: Christel Dewynter
- Music by: Éric Slabiak
- Distributed by: SND Films
- Release date: 20 May 2017 (Cannes)
- Running time: 100 minutes
- Countries: France; Belgium
- Language: French
- Budget: $6 million
- Box office: $6.7 million

Just to Be Sure (French: Ôtez-moi d'un Doute) is a 2017 French-Belgian comedy film directed by Carine Tardieu. It was screened in the Directors' Fortnight section at the 2017 Cannes Film Festival. It received two nominations at the 8th Magritte Awards.

== Cast ==
- François Damiens as Erwan Gourmelon
- Cécile De France as Doctor Anna Levkine
- Guy Marchand as Bastien Gourmelon
- André Wilms as Joseph Levkine
- Alice de Lencquesaing as Juliette Gourmelon
- Lyes Salem as Madjid
- Brigitte Roüan as Cécile
- Nadège Beausson-Diagne as The mother of the young girl

== Reception ==
On review aggregator Rotten Tomatoes, the film holds an approval rating of 85%, based on 13 reviews with an average rating of 6.6/10.
