= The Ties That Bind Us =

2024 French-Belgian drama film by Carine Tardieu

- French theatrical release poster
- French: L'Attachement
- Directed by: Carine Tardieu
- Written by: Carine Tardieu; Agnès Feuvre; Raphaële Moussafir
- Produced by: Antoine Rein; Antoine Gandaubert; Fabrice Goldstein
- Starring: Pio Marmaï; Valeria Bruni Tedeschi; Vimala Pons; Raphaël Quenard; César Botti
- Cinematography: Elin Kirschfink; Yann Maritaud
- Edited by: Christel Dewynter
- Music by: Éric Slabiak
- Production companies: Karé Productions; France 2 Cinéma; Umedia
- Distributed by: Diaphana Distribution (France); Cinéart (Benelux)
- Release dates: 4 September 2024 (Venice); 19 February 2025 (France)
- Running time: 106 minutes
- Countries: France; Belgium
- Language: French

The Ties That Bind Us (French: L'Attachement) is a 2024 drama film co-written and directed by Carine Tardieu. It stars Valeria Bruni Tedeschi, Pio Marmaï, Vimala Pons, Raphaël Quenard and César Botti.

The film had its world premiere at the Orizzonti section of the 81st Venice International Film Festival on 4 September 2024. It was theatrically released in France on 19 February 2025. At the 51st César Awards, it won Best Film, Best Adaptation and Best Supporting Actress for Pons.

== Cast ==
- Valeria Bruni Tedeschi as Sandra Ferney
- Pio Marmaï as Alexandre "Alex" Perthuis
- Vimala Pons as Emillia Demetriu
- Raphaël Quenard as David
- César Botti as Elliott
- Catherine Mouchet as Fanny
- Marie-Christine Barrault as Sandra's mother
- Florence Muller as Marianne
- Mélissa Barbaud as Cécile

== Production ==
The film is based on the novel L’Intimité by Alice Ferney. It was produced by Karé Productions, with France 2 Cinéma and Umedia serving as co-producers.

== Release ==
The film had its world premiere at the 81st Venice International Film Festival in the Orizzonti sidebar. It was released in French cinemas on 19 February 2025. In Germany, the film start was on 7 August 2025 with a kick-off at Taunus Filmfest Oberursel.

== Reception ==
Cineuropa's film critic Fabien Lemercier praised the film, describing it as "charming" and "a delicate, humanist film". Guillemette Odicino from Télérama described the film as "an incredibly delicate chronicle of emotional reconstruction". According to Le Parisien, the film is "a beautifully staged story, very well acted by a small choral cast, ... particularly noteworthy for Valeria Bruni Tedeschi's spot-on portrayal of a surly old maid who opens up to life through contact with a child".

The film received eight nominations at the 51st César Awards, including for best film and best director.
