= Mohamed Habib Attia =

Tunisian film producer

Mohamed Habib Attia حبيب عطية
- Born: Mohamed Habib Attia; 1983 (age 42–43); Tunis, Tunisia
- Occupation: Producer
- Years active: 2008–present
- Notable work: We Could Be Heroes

Mohamed Habib Attia (born 1983), is a Tunisian film producer. He is best known as the producer of critically acclaimed films Falastine Stereo, It Was Better Tomorrow and Le Challat de Tunis.

== Life and career ==
Attia was born in 1983 in Tunis, Tunisia.

In 2009, he co-produced the film Laila's Birthday as an international production with Palestine and Netherlands. The film was directed by Rashid Masharawi. In 2011, Attia produced No More Fear directed by Mourad Ben Cheikh made official selection at the Cannes Film Festival and subsequently in Busan, Taormina, Sheffield, Dubai film festivals. In 2012, his film It Was Better Tomorrow directed by Hinde Boujemaa was premiered at the official selection at the Venice Film Festival, and won the Best Arab Director award in Dubai International Film Festival. In 2013, he produced the Rashid Masharawi's film Falastine Stereo. It was officially selected in Toronto, Dubai and Chicago film festivals.

In 2016, he joined with Zaineb n'aime Pas la Neigh directed by Kaouther Ben Hania. The film had its world premiere at the Locarno International Film Festival, and won the Tanit d'or award at the Carthage Cinematographic Days as well as the prize for Best Documentary at Cinemed Montpellier. In 2014, his production Le Challaat de Tunis opened the ACID section at the Cannes festival and won the prize for Best First Film at the Namur Festival, for Best Director and Best Film in Beirut. The film was officially selected in Dubai, San Sebastian and Busan film festivals and theatrically distributed in more than 15 countries.

In 2017, he collaborated for another international co-production, Beauty and the Dogs. The film was screened in the Un Certain Regard section at the 2017 Cannes Film Festival. It was later selected as the Tunisian entry for the Best Foreign Language Film at the 91st Academy Awards, but it was not nominated. It was later obtained the Prize for best sound creation, he subsequently won the prize for best film in Student Jury at the Angoulême Francophone Film Festival.

He is the CEO of film production company, 'Cinétéléfilms' since 2007. The company was established in 1983. In 2018, he produced We Could Be Heroes directed by Hind Bensari. The film won the grand prize at Hot Docs Canadian International Documentary Festival.

== Filmography ==
Year	Film	Role	Genre	Ref.
2008	The Carthage Castaways	Producer	Film	
2008	A Season Between Heaven and Hell	Producer	Short film	
2008	The Wedding Song	Executive producer	Film	
2009	Laila's Birthday	Producer	Film	
2010	Attouga, the legend	Producer	Documentary	
2010	Sideways	Producer	Short film	
2011	No More Fear	Producer	Documentary	
2011	Viva Carthago	Producer	Film	
2012	Cursed Be the Phosphate	Producer	Documentary	
2012	It Was Better Tomorrow	Producer	Documentary	
2013	Democracy: Year Zero	Producer	Documentary	
2013	Falastine Stereo	Producer	Film	
2013	Le Challat de Tunis	Producer	Documentary	
2014	Bobby	Producer	Short film	
2016	Zaineb Hates the Snow	Producer	Documentary	
2016	We Are Just Fine Like This	Producer	Short film	
2016	Avant Première	Producer	Short film	
2017	35 MM	Producer	Short film	
2017	Beauty and the Dogs	Producer	Film	
2017	Writing on Snow	Producer	Film	
2018	We Could Be Heroes	Producer	Film	
2018	Leila's Blues	Producer	Short film	
2018	Brotherhood	Producer	Short film	
2018	Sheikh's Watermelons	Producer	Short film	
2019	A Son	Producer	Film	
2019	Fataria, Arab Summit	Producer	Film	
2020	The Man Who Sold His Skin	Executive producer	Film	
2024	Aïcha	Producer	Film	
