= List of Labes on Mars =

Labes is also the German name of Łobez, Poland. As well as an extinct mammal.

Labes (plural: labes) is a Latin word used by exogeologists to refer to chaotic regions, featuring ridges and steep valleys, in the Valles Marineris region of Mars. Labes are named after the nearest classical albedo feature.

== List of labes ==
This is a list of all named labes. Planetocentric coordinates are given as planetocentric latitude with east longitude.

Labes	Coordinates	Diameter (km)	Approval date	Named after	Refs
Baetis Labēs	3.67°S 288.54°E	88	2017	Classical albedo feature, Baetis	WGPSN
Candor Labes	4.75°S 283.8°E	134.94	1988	From classical albedo feature at 5N, 75W	WGPSN
Ceti Labes	6.78°S 284.27°E	11.05	2012	Classical albedo features name	WGPSN
Coprates Labes	11.77°S 292.1°E	61.97	1985	From albedo feature at 14S, 65W	WGPSN
Ius Labes	7.52°S 281.4°E	61.18	1988	Classical albedo feature name	WGPSN
Melas Labes	8.5°S 288.3°E	107.24	1985	Classical albedo feature at 10S, 74W	WGPSN
Ophir Labes	10.98°S 291.5°E	92.53	1985	Classical albedo feature at 10S, 65W	WGPSN
