= The Richest Woman in the World =

- French: La Femme la plus riche du monde
- Directed by: Thierry Klifa
- Written by: Thierry Klifa; Cédric Anger; Jacques Fieschi
- Produced by: Mathias Rubin
- Starring: Isabelle Huppert; Laurent Lafitte; Marina Foïs; Raphaël Personnaz; André Marcon; Mathieu Demy
- Cinematography: Hichame Alaouie
- Edited by: Chantal Hymans
- Music by: Alex Beaupain
- Production companies: Récifilms; Versus Production; Radio Télévision Belge Francophone (RTBF); BE TV; Proximus; Blue Parrot Production; Les Films du Camélia
- Distributed by: Haut et Court (France)
- Release dates: 18 May 2025 (Cannes); 29 October 2025 (France)
- Running time: 123 minutes
- Countries: France; Belgium
- Languages: French; Hebrew
- Box office: $7.3 million

The Richest Woman in the World (French: La Femme la plus riche du monde) is a 2025 French-Belgian comedy-drama film directed by Thierry Klifa, who co-wrote the screenplay with Cédric Anger and Jacques Fieschi, loosely based on the Bettencourt affair. Starring Isabelle Huppert, Laurent Lafitte, Marina Foïs, and Raphaël Personnaz, it follows an heiress whose immense fortune shapes her relationships, public image, and emotional life.

The film had its world premiere out of competition at the 2025 Cannes Film Festival on 18 May. It was theatrically released in France by Haut et Court on 29 October 2025.

== Plot ==
The plot is loosely based on the Bettencourt affair, concerning the life of a wealthy L’Oréal heiress.

Marianne Farrère, heir to a major cosmetics empire and considered the richest woman in the world, meets Pierre‑Alain Fantin, a Parisian writer‑photographer, during a photoshoot. Their unexpected encounter develops into a close and ambiguous friendship that blends admiration, fascination, and tension. As Marianne navigates her immense wealth, she faces family secrets, shifting loyalties, and a series of increasingly high‑stakes emotional and financial entanglements.

== Cast ==
- Isabelle Huppert as Marianne Farrère
- Laurent Lafitte as Pierre-Alain Fantin
- Marina Foïs as Frédérique Spielman
- Raphaël Personnaz as Jérôme Bonjean
- André Marcon as Guy Farrère
- Mathieu Demy as Jean-Marc Spielman
- Joseph Olivennes as Raphaël d'Alloz
- Micha Lescot as De Veray
- Paul Beaurepaire as Charles Spielman

== Production ==
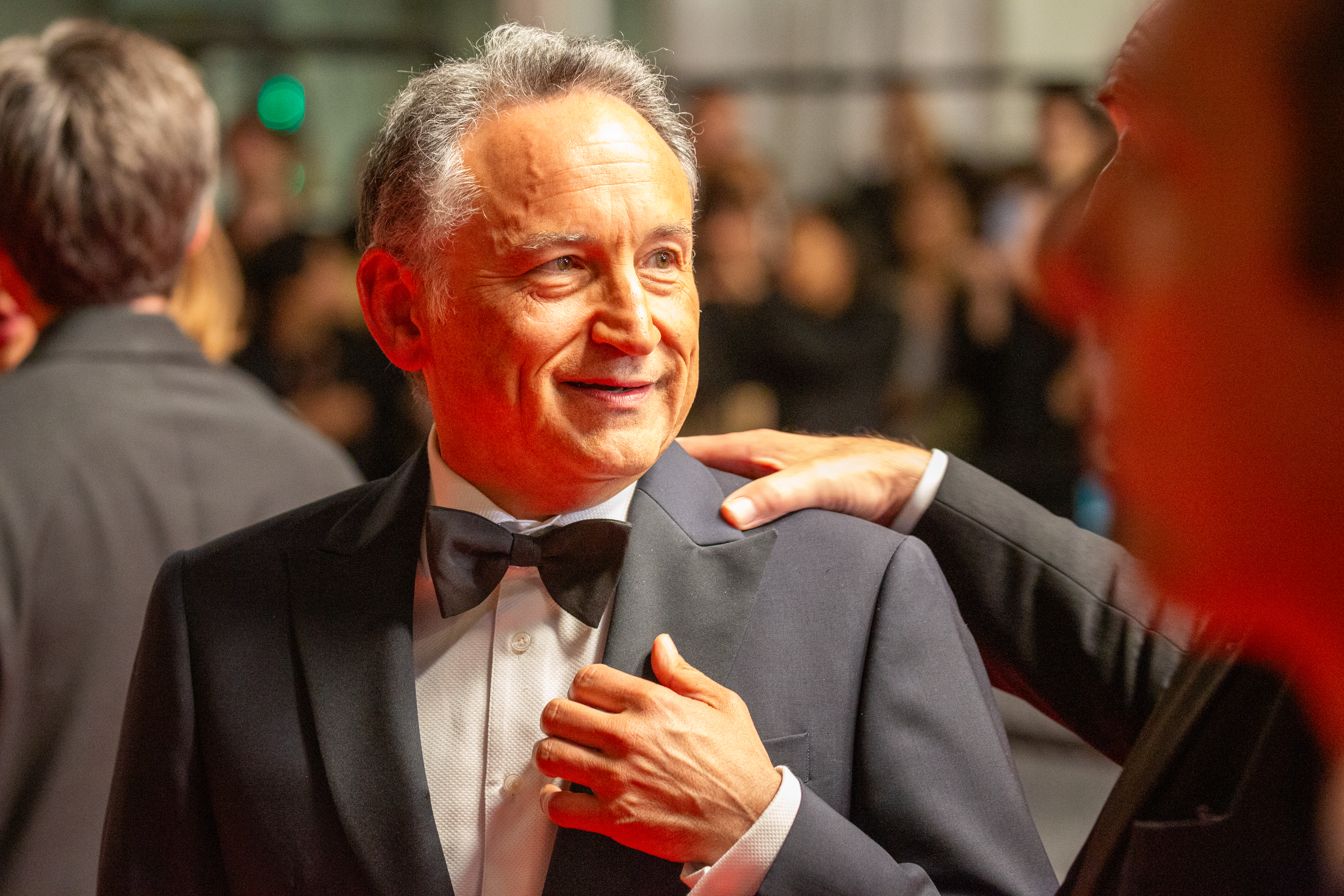
Thierry Klifa at the 2025 Cannes Film Festival

The Richest Woman in the World was directed by Thierry Klifa, who co-wrote the screenplay with Cédric Anger and Jacques Fieschi.

== Release ==
The film had its world premiere out of competition at the 2025 Cannes Film Festival on 18 May. It was theatrically released in France by Haut et Court on 29 October 2025.

== Reception ==
=== Box office ===
It grossed $7.3 million at the French box-office.

=== Critical response ===
Writing for Variety, Guy Lodge described the film as a sharply observed parable about wealth and influence, noting Huppert's commanding presence in the lead role and the film's mixture of social critique and dark humor.
