= Mehdi Hmili =

Tunisian filmmaker

- Born: Mehdi Hmili; Tunis, Tunisia
- Education: Manouba University; Paris Film School
- Occupations: Director, screenwriter, cinematographer, poet
- Years active: 2009–present

Mehdi Hmili, is a Tunisian filmmaker. He is best known as the director of critically acclaimed shorts and feature films Thala My Love, The Night of Badr and Li-La.

== Personal life ==
He was born and raised in Tunis, Tunisia. After graduating with a degree in direction and screenplay from the Manouba University in Tunis, he moved to France for further studies.

== Career ==
In France, he graduated from the Paris Film School. After graduation, he directed his maiden short film X-Moment in 2009 and then Li-La in 2011. This black and white drama revolves around the difficulty of loving. After the critic success, he directed his second short The Night Of Badr, another black and white drama about an old homosexual poet. The film was screened in March 2012.

In 2014, he worked as the cinematographer of the documentary short Offside. Then in 2016, he made his debut feature film Thala Mon Amour. The film focused in the village of Thala during the Tunisian Revolution. The film was later released at the end of 2014 in France and Tunisia. Apart from filmmaking, he is also a popular poet in Tunisia where he made poems against the regime of Ben Ali. He also made two 16mm films, Instant Guilty and The Graduate.

== Filmography ==
Year	Film	Role	Genre	Ref.
2009	X-Moment	Director, writer, actor	Short film	
2010	Li-La	Director, writer, actor	Short film	
2012	The Night of Badr	Director, writer	Short film	
2014	Offside	Cinematographer	Documentary short	
2016	Thala My Love	Director, writer	Film	
2017	Aya	Producer	Short film	
2022	Streams	Director, Writer, Co-Producer	Long film	
