= Carine Tardieu =

French film director (born 1973)

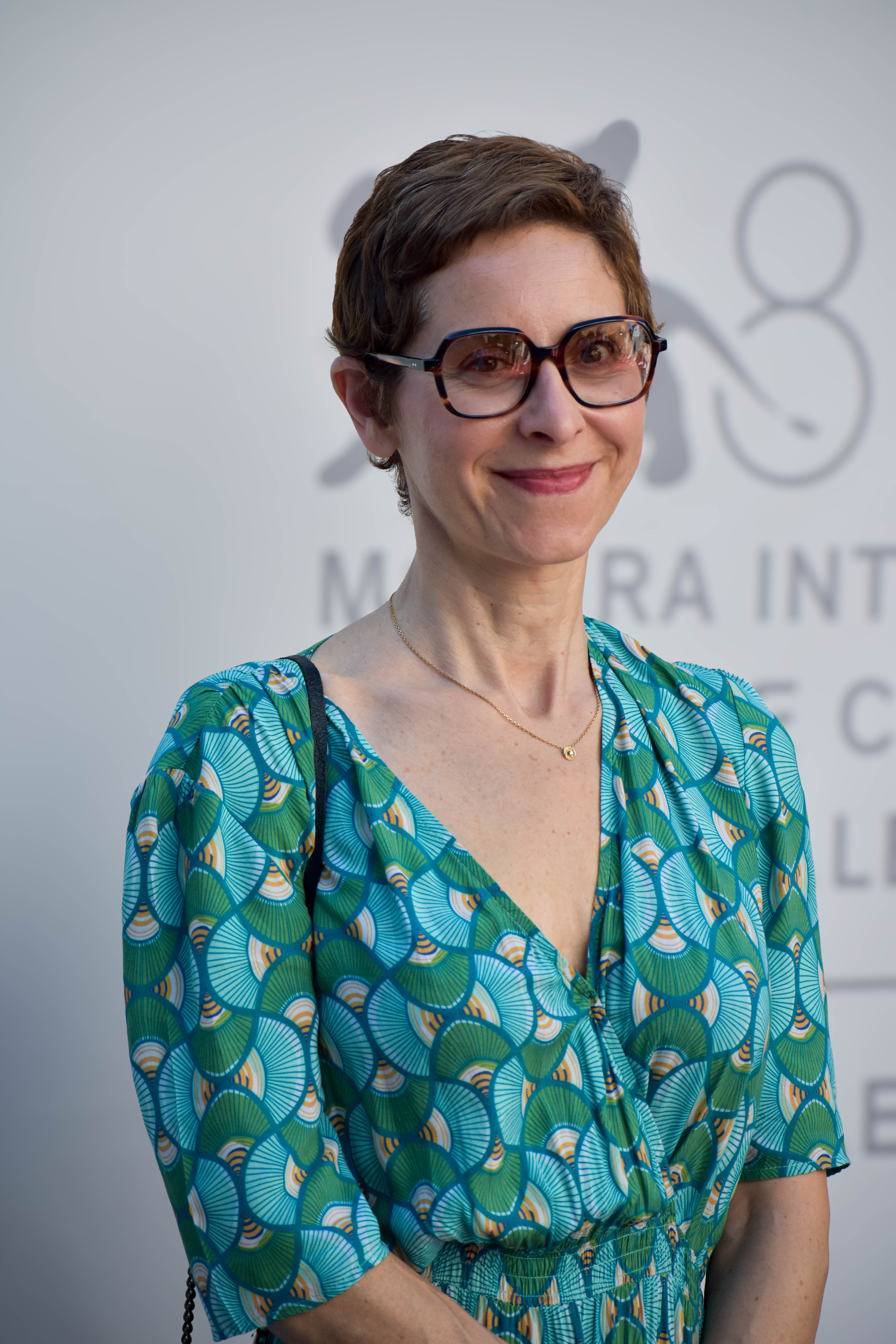
- Tardieu at the 81st Venice Film Festival (2024)
- Born: 22 September 1973 (age 52); Paris, France
- Occupation: Film director

Carine Tardieu (born 22 September 1973) is a French film director and screenwriter, best known for The Ties That Bind Us, which won the César Award for Best Film.

== Life and career ==
Born in the 12th arrondissement of Paris, Tardieu studied cinema at the École Supérieure de Réalisation Audiovisuelle. She then worked as an assistant director and scriptwriter on several films and TV-movies.

Between 2002 and 2004, Tardieu directed two award-winning short films, Les Baisers des autres and L'Aîné de mes soucis, which won the Audience Award at the Clermont-Ferrand Film Festival. She was noted by Christophe Rossignon of Nord-Ouest Productions, who produced her first feature film in 2007, In Mom's Head, co-written with Michel Leclerc.

For her second feature film, The Dandelions (2012), Tardieu adapted the novel Du vent dans mes mollets with its author, Raphaële Moussafir. Her third feature, the comedy Just to Be Sure, was screened in the Directors' Fortnight section of the 2017 Cannes Film Festival.

In 2022, Tardieu directed The Young Lovers, based on an idea by Sólveig Anspach, which got Fanny Ardant a César Award for Best Actress nomination. Her following film, The Ties That Bind Us, had its world premiere in the Orizzonti section at the 2024 Venice Film Festival. For this film Tardieu received César Award nominations for Best Director and for Best Adaptation, winning for the latter.

== Filmography ==
- In Mom's Head (2007)
- The Dandelions (2012)
- Just to Be Sure (2017)
- The Young Lovers (2022)
- The Ties That Bind Us (2024)
