= Hind Bensari =

Moroccan filmmaker (born 1987)

Hind Bensari هند بن ساري
- Born: Hind Bensari; 1987 (age 38–39); Casablanca, Morocco
- Education: University of Edinburgh; London School of Economics and Political Science
- Occupations: Director, TEDx speaker
- Years active: 2013–present

Hind Bensari (Arabic: هند بن ساري; born 1987), is a Moroccan filmmaker. She is well known as the director that made critically acclaimed documentary films: 475: Break the Silence and We Could Be Heroes.

== Personal life ==
She was born in 1987 in Casablanca, Morocco. However at a very young age, she moved to London. Bensari graduated with a degree in Economics and Middle-Eastern studies from the University of Edinburgh. She also holds a certificate in International Political Economy from the London School of Economics and Political Science.

She is married to a Danish businessman and currently lives in Denmark.

== Career ==
In 2014, she returned Morocco to make her maiden documentary short film was 475: Break the Silence. It has contributed to a movement in Morocco to that succeeded in repealing a new law that allowed men accused of rape to marry their victims. The film won critical acclaim from the New York Times and Germany's ARD channel as well as was an internet sensation. It also broke the audience record at 2M TV in Morocco and broadcast in other countries including Denmark, Portugal, Canada and sold for more than 20 worldwide channels. She is also a TEDx speaker.

On 2 May 2018, she released the film We Could Be Heroes which was premiered at 2018 Hot Docs Canadian International Documentary Film Festival. The film is based on a story of two disabled friends, Azzedine and Youssef, who dreams to break out of the prison and compete in Rio Paralympic Games. The film won the Jury Prize at the Hot Docs Canadian International Documentary Festival. The film was also won the "Best International Documentary Award" in Toronto International Film Festival, becoming the first African filmmaker to receive the award. Then the film won Grand Prix at the Tangier National Film Festival.

== Filmography ==
Year	Film	Role	Genre	Ref.
2014	475: Break the Silence	Director	documentary short film	
2018	We Could Be Heroes	Director	documentary film	
