= A Son =

- Directed by: Mehdi Barsaoui
- Produced by: Mohamed Habib Attia; Marc Irmer
- Starring: Sami Bouajila; Najla Ben Abdallah; Youssef Khemiri
- Music by: Amine Bouhafa
- Release date: 30 August 2019 (Venice Film Festival)
- Running time: 96 minutes
- Countries: France; Lebanon; Tunisia; Qatar
- Languages: Arabic; French

A Son, also known as Bik Eneich: Un fils (a combination of the original Arabic and French titles: Arabic: بيك نعيش, romanized: Byk n'eysh; French: Un fils) is a 2019 film directed by Mehdi Barsaoui in his feature film debut and co-produced between France, Lebanon, Tunisia and Qatar. Starring Sami Bouajila and Najla Ben Abdallah as middle-class Tunisian parents, film is about a family trip soon after the Tunisian Revolution that is disrupted after terrorists shoot their car and gravely injure their son, who needs a liver transplant to survive.

== Cast ==
- Sami Bouajila
- Najla Ben Abdallah

== Release ==
A Son was screened at the 76th Venice International Film Festival on 30 August 2019.

== Accolades ==
Awards and nominations for A Son
| Awards | Category | Recipient(s) | Result | Ref. |
|---|---|---|---|---|
| 26th Lumière Awards | Best Actor | Sami Bouajila | Won | |
| 26th Lumière Awards | Best Female Revelation | Najla Ben Abdallah | Nominated | |
| 46th César Awards | Best Actor | Sami Bouajila | Won | |
