= Two of Us (2019 film) =

2019 film

- Film poster
- Directed by: Filippo Meneghetti
- Written by: Filippo Meneghetti; Malysone Bovorasmy
- Produced by: Pierre Emmanuel Fleurantin; Laurent Baujard
- Starring: Barbara Sukowa; Martine Chevallier
- Release dates: 7 September 2019 (TIFF); 12 February 2020 (France)
- Running time: 91 minutes
- Countries: France; Belgium; Luxembourg
- Languages: French; German
- Box office: $344.300

Two of Us (French: Deux) is a 2019 French romantic drama film directed by Filippo Meneghetti. It was selected as the French entry for the Best International Feature Film at the 93rd Academy Awards, making the shortlist of fifteen films.

== Plot ==
Two elderly women, Madeleine and Nina, are neighbours who have been secret lovers for decades. After Madeleine's husband passes away, they plan to move to Rome but things go wrong when Madeleine has a sudden stroke after an argument and becomes mute and paralyzed. She is therefore unable to tell her family the truth about her relationship. The family hire a live-in carer, Muriel, to take care of an immobilised Madeleine. This causes strain between the carer and Nina, who wishes to care for Madeleine herself and constantly sneaks over to the apartment to see her.

Nina and Muriel reach a deal without Madeleine's family knowing in which Nina can care for Madeleine and will pay the carer for not doing the job. The family buy Madeleine a kitten named Bart and have dinner with the two woman to learn more about Nina. Thinking Nina is only a neighbour and distant acquaintance, the daughter (Anne) tells Nina that her mother has only had one true love, her husband, and never remarried.

Whilst looking through a photo album, Madeleines's grandson notes that a group picture taken in Rome seems to show Mrs Dorn (Nina). This prompts Madeleine to run over to Nina's apartment and hug her, showing a remarkable improvement in her mobility and recovery from the stroke. Later in the evening, Anne finds Madeleine packing a suitcase in distress and stops her to hug her.

One evening, Nina goes over to the apartment and climbs into bed with Madeleine only to be found in the morning by Madeleine's daughter, Anne, who screams at her to get out of the apartment. Later, as Nina rings the doorbell to try return to the apartment, she is ignored by the daughter, who is now suspicious of Nina.

This prompts the family to move Madeleine to a care facility, and a distraught Nina is cut off contact. Not knowing where Madeleine is being kept, Nina searches and finds the address to break Madeleine out of the facility, with the two of them ending up back in the apartment. Barricading themselves in, Nina and Madeleine slow dance to their favourite song as Anne furiously tries to get in the door.

== Cast ==
- Barbara Sukowa as Nina Dorn
- Martine Chevallier as Madeleine Girard
- Léa Drucker as Anne
- Jérôme Varanfrain as Frédéric
- Muriel Bénazéraf as Muriel
- Augustin Reynes as Théo

== Reception ==
Rotten Tomatoes gives the film a 98% approval rating based on 101 reviews, with an average rating of 7.8/10. The website's critics consensus reads: "A remarkable feature debut for director/co-writer Filippo Meneghetti, Two of Us tells a deceptively complex love story while presenting a rich acting showcase for its three leads." According to Metacritic, which sampled 20 critics and calculated a weighted average score of 82 out of 100, the film received "universal acclaim".

== See also ==
- List of submissions to the 93rd Academy Awards for Best International Feature Film
- List of French submissions for the Academy Award for Best International Feature Film
