= Nadia Melliti =

French actress

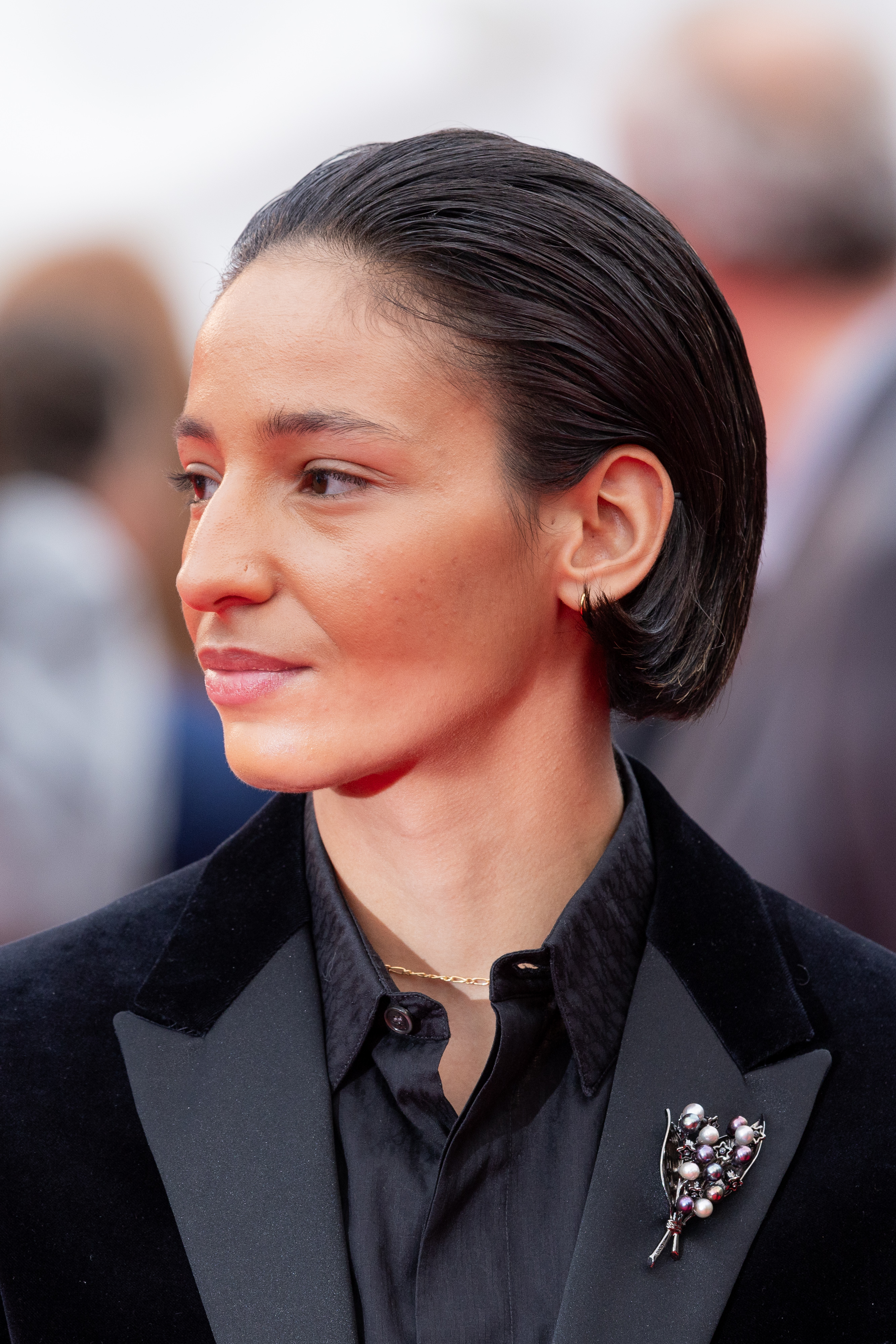
- Melliti at the 2025 Cannes Film Festival
- Born: 30 March 2002 (age 24)
- Education: Sorbonne Paris North University
- Occupation: Actress
- Years active: 2025–present

Nadia Melliti (French: [nadja meliti]; born 30 March 2002) is a French actress. She made her screen debut in Hafsia Herzi's The Little Sister (2025), a role which earned her the Cannes Film Festival Award for Best Actress at the 78th Cannes Film Festival.

== Early life ==
Melliti was born on 30 March 2002. She was raised in Romainville, Seine-Saint-Denis. She is of Algerian descent through her mother, and can speak Arabic fluently. She was a footballer, and studies STAPS at Sorbonne Paris North University.

== Career ==
While a student, Melliti was discovered by a casting director on the streets of Paris, having had no previous acting experience. In 2025, she made her screen debut in Hafsia Herzi's coming-of-age drama film The Little Sister, which premiered at the 78th Cannes Film Festival. The role earned her critical acclaim, and she was awarded the Cannes Film Festival Award for Best Actress.

== Filmography ==
Year	Title	Role	Ref.
2025	The Little Sister	Fatima	

== Awards and nominations ==
Award	Year	Category	Nominated work	Result	Ref.
Cannes Film Festival	2025	Best Actress	The Little Sister	Won	
