= Mehdi Barsaoui =

Tunisian filmmaker

- Born: Mehdi M. Barsaoui; May 23, 1984 (age 42); Tunis, Tunisia
- Education: Higher Institute of Multimedia Arts of Tunis; DAMS
- Occupations: Director, screenwriter, cinematographer, poet
- Years active: 2010–present
- Notable work: A Son

Mehdi M. Barsaoui (born 23 May 1984), is a Tunisian filmmaker. He is best known as the director of the critically acclaimed feature film A Son (2019) and shorts Sideways (2010) and Bobby (2014).

== Personal life ==
He was born on 23 May 1984 in Tunis, Tunisia. He graduated from the Higher Institute of Multimedia Arts of Tunis (ISAMM). After graduation, he moved to Italy and completed his training and graduated from DAMS in Bologna.

== Career ==
During the life in Italy, he directed three short films: Sideways (2010), Bobby (2014) and We Are Just Fine Like This (2016). All three short film received critical acclaim and then selected in several international festivals where they won several prizes. The short We Are Just Fine Like This won the Best Muhr Short award at the Dubai International Film Festival.

In 2019, he made his directorial debut with the film, Un fils (A Son) which was produced as a collaborative work of Tunisia, France, Lebanon and Qatar. The film had its premiere at the Venice International Film Festival. The film received official selection at the Venice Film Festival 2019, where Sami Bouajila won the award for best actor in the Orizzonti section. At the Filmfest Hamburg, the film won the NDR Young Talent Award. The film also received critical acclaim. In 2020, the film won Prabhat International Award at Pune International Film Festival (PIFF).

== Filmography ==
Year	Film	Role	Genre	Ref.
2010	Sideways	Director, editor, writer	Short film	
2012	It Was Better Tomorrow	Editor	Documentary	
2012	Widjène	Editor	Documentary	
2013	Le Challat de Tunis	First assistant director	Documentary	
2014	Bobby	Director, editor, writer	Short film	
2016	We Are Just Fine Like This	Director, editor, writer	Short film	
2017	35 MM	Director, editor, writer	Short film	
2017	Beauty and the Dogs	First assistant director	Film	
2018	Omertà	Editor	Short film	
2019	A Son	Director, writer	Film	
2024	Aïcha	Director, writer	Film	
