= Lumière Award for Best Screenplay =

French film award

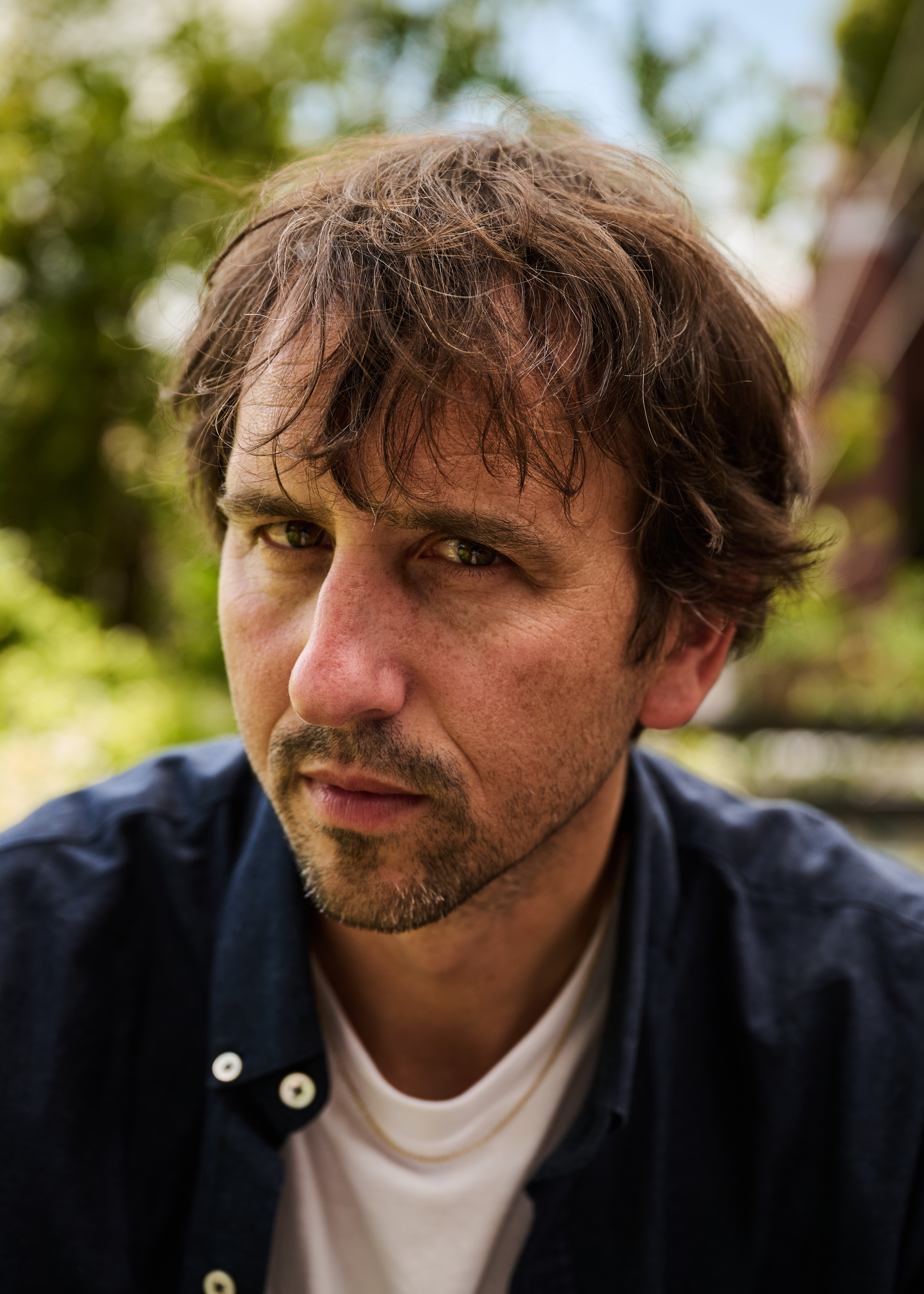
- 2026 recipient: Stéphane Demoustier
- Country: France
- Presented by: Académie des Lumières
- First award: 1996
- Currently held by: Stéphane Demoustier for The Great Arch (2026)
- Website: academiedeslumieres.com

The Lumière Award for Best Screenplay (French: Lumière du meilleur scénario) is an annual award presented by the Académie des Lumières since 1996.

== Winners and nominees ==
Winners for Best Original or Adapted Screenplay are listed first with a blue background, followed by the other nominees.

=== 1990s ===
Year	Screenwriter(s)	English title	Original title
1996 (1st)	Josiane Balasko	French Twist	Gazon maudit
1997 (2nd)	Cédric Klapisch, Jean-Pierre Bacri and Agnès Jaoui	Family Resemblances	Un air de famille
1998 (3rd)	Manuel Poirier and Jean-François Goyet	Western	
1999 (4th)	Francis Veber	The Dinner Game	Le Dîner de cons

=== 2000s ===
Year	Screenwriter(s)	English title	Original title
2000 (5th)	Danièle Thompson and Christopher Thompson	Season's Beatings	La Bûche
2001 (6th)	Jean-Pierre Bacri and Agnès Jaoui	The Taste of Others	Le Goût des autres
2002 (7th)	Jean-Pierre Jeunet and Guillaume Laurant	Amélie	Le Fabuleux Destin d'Amélie Poulain
2003 (8th)	Cédric Klapisch	L'Auberge Espagnole	
2004 (9th)	Julie Bertuccelli and Bernard Renucci	Since Otar Left	Depuis qu'Otar est parti…
2005 (10th)	Abdellatif Kechiche	Games of Love and Chance	L'Esquive
2006 (11th)	Michael Haneke	Caché	
2007 (12th)	Rachid Bouchareb and Olivier Lorelle	Days of Glory	Indigènes
2007 (12th)	Isabelle Mergault	You Are So Beautiful	Je vous trouve très beau
2007 (12th)	Odile Barski, Claude Chabrol	Comedy of Power	L'Ivresse du pouvoir
2007 (12th)	Guillaume Canet, Philippe Lefebvre	Tell No One	Ne le dis à personne
2007 (12th)	Julie Gavras	Blame It on Fidel	La Faute à Fidel
2008 (13th)	Alfred Lot	Room of Death	La Chambre des morts
2008 (13th)	Valeria Bruni Tedeschi, Agnès De Sacy, Noémie Lvovsky	Actrices	
2008 (13th)	Laurent Guyot, André Téchiné, Viviane Zingg	The Witnesses	Les Témoins
2008 (13th)	Laurent de Bartillat, Alain Ross	The Vanishing Point	Ce que mes yeux ont vu
2008 (13th)	Christine Carrière	Darling	
2009 (14th)	Samuel Benchetrit	I Always Wanted to Be a Gangster	J'ai toujours rêvé d'être un gangster
2009 (14th)	François Bégaudeau, Robin Campillo, Laurent Cantet	The Class	Entre les murs
2009 (14th)	Marc Abdelnour, Martin Provost	Séraphine	
2009 (14th)	Dany Boon, Alexandre Charlot, Franck Magnier	Bienvenue chez les Ch'tis	
2009 (14th)	Benoît Delépine, Gustave Kervern	Louise Hires a Contract Killer	Louise-Michel

=== 2010s ===
Year	Screenwriter(s)	English title	Original title
2010 (15th)	Mia Hansen-Løve	Father of My Children	Le Père de mes enfants
2010 (15th)	Jacques Audiard, Thomas Bidegain, Abdel Raouf Dafri, Nicolas Peufaillit	A Prophet	Un prophète
2010 (15th)	Alain-Michel Blanc, Héctor Cabello Reyes, Thierry Degrandi, Radu Mihaileanu, Matthew Robbins	The Concert	Le Concert
2010 (15th)	Olivier Adam, Emmanuel Courcol, Philippe Lioret	Welcome	
2010 (15th)	Mathias Gokalp, Nadine Lamari	The Ordinary People	Rien de personnel
2011 (16th)	Robert Harris and Roman Polanski	The Ghost Writer	
2011 (16th)	Rachid Bouchareb, Olivier Lorelle	Outside the Law	Hors-la-loi
2011 (16th)	Hervé Mimran, Géraldine Nakache	Tout ce qui brille	
2011 (16th)	Julie Bertuccelli	The Tree	L'Arbre
2011 (16th)	Baya Kasmi, Michel Leclerc	The Names of Love	Le Nom des gens
2012 (17th)	Jean-Louis Milesi and Robert Guédiguian	The Snows of Kilimanjaro	Les Neiges du Kilimandjaro
2012 (17th)	Pierre Schoeller	The Minister	L'Exercice de l'Etat
2012 (17th)	Emmanuelle Bercot, Maïwenn	Polisse	
2012 (17th)	Bertrand Bonello	House of Tolerance	L'Apollonide: Souvenirs de la maison close
2012 (17th)	Michel Hazanavicius	The Artist	
2013 (18th)	Jacques Audiard and Thomas Bidegain	Rust and Bone	De rouille et d'os
2013 (18th)	Thierry Binisti, Valérie Zenatti	A Bottle in the Gaza Sea	Une bouteille à la mer
2013 (18th)	Benoît Jacquot, Gilles Taurand	Farewell, My Queen	Les Adieux à la reine
2013 (18th)	Florence Seyvos, Maud Ameline, Pierre-Olivier Mattei	Camille Rewinds	Camille Redouble
2013 (18th)	Leos Carax	Holy Motors	
2014 (19th)	David Ives and Roman Polanski	Venus in Fur	La Vénus à la fourrure
2014 (19th)	Jean-Paul Lilienfeld	Arrêtez-moi	
2014 (19th)	Bruno Dumont	Camille Claudel 1915	
2014 (19th)	Bertrand Tavernier	The French Minister	Quai d'Orsay
2014 (19th)	Asghar Farhadi	The Past	Le Passé
2014 (19th)	Nabil Ben Yadir	The Marchers	La Marche
2014 (19th)	Albert Dupontel	9 Month Stretch	9 mois ferme
2015 (20th)	Philippe de Chauveron and Guy Laurent	Serial (Bad) Weddings	Qu'est-ce qu'on a fait au Bon Dieu ?
2015 (20th)	Thomas Lilti, Julien Lilti, Baya Kasmi and Pierre Chosson	Hippocrate	
2015 (20th)	Audrey Diwan and Cédric Jimenez	The Connection	La French
2015 (20th)	Jeanne Herry and Gaëlle Macé	Elle l'adore	
2015 (20th)	Thomas Bidegain and Bertrand Bonello	Saint Laurent	
2015 (20th)	Stanislas Carré de Malberg and Victoria Bedos	The Bélier Family	La Famille Bélier
2016 (21st)	Philippe Faucon	Fatima	
2016 (21st)	Catherine Corsini and Laurette Polmanss	Summertime	La Belle Saison
2016 (21st)	Arnaud Desplechin and Julie Peyr	My Golden Days	Trois souvenirs de ma jeunesse
2016 (21st)	Deniz Gamze Ergüven and Alice Winocour	Mustang	
2016 (21st)	Xavier Giannoli	Marguerite	
2016 (21st)	Arnaud and Jean-Marie Larrieu	21 Nights with Pattie	21 nuits avec Pattie
2017 (22nd)	Céline Sciamma	My Life as a Courgette	Ma vie de Courgette
2017 (22nd)	David Birke	Elle	
2017 (22nd)	Léa Fehner, Catherine Paillé and Brigitte Sy	Les Ogres	
2017 (22nd)	Emilie Frèche and Marie-Castille Mention-Schaar	Heaven Will Wait	Le Ciel attendra
2017 (22nd)	Alain Guiraudie	Staying Vertical	Rester vertical
2017 (22nd)	François Ozon	Frantz	
2018 (23rd)	Robin Campillo and Philippe Mangeot	BPM (Beats per Minute)	120 battements par minute
2018 (23rd)	Christelle Berthevas and Arnaud des Pallières	Orphan	Orpheline
2018 (23rd)	Albert Dupontel and Pierre Lemaitre	See You Up There	Au revoir là-haut
2018 (23rd)	Karim Moussaoui and Maud Ameline	Until the Birds Return	En attendant les hirondelles
2018 (23rd)	Éric Toledano and Olivier Nakache	C'est la vie!	Le Sens de la fête
2019 (24th)	Pierre Salvadori, Benoît Graffin and Benjamin Charbit	The Trouble with You	En liberté!
2019 (24th)	Andréa Bescond and Eric Métayer	Little Tickles	Les Chatouilles
2019 (24th)	Jeanne Herry	In Safe Hands	Pupille
2019 (24th)	Thomas Lilti	The Freshmen	Première année
2019 (24th)	Emmanuel Mouret	Mademoiselle de Joncquières	

=== 2020s ===
Year	Screenwriter(s)	English title	Original title
2020 (25th)	Ladj Ly, Giordano Gederlini, Alexis Manenti	Les Misérables	
2020 (25th)	Nicolas Pariser	Alice and the Mayor	Alice et le maire
2020 (25th)	Nicolas Bedos	La Belle Époque	
2020 (25th)	François Ozon	By the Grace of God	Grâce à Dieu
2020 (25th)	Robert Harris, Roman Polanski	An Officer and a Spy	J'Accuse
2021 (26th)	Stéphane Demoustier	The Girl with a Bracelet	La Fille au bracelet
2021 (26th)	Jean-Louis Milesi	Josep	
2021 (26th)	Emmanuel Mouret	Love Affair(s)	Les Choses qu'on dit, les choses qu'on fait
2021 (26th)	Caroline Vignal	My Donkey, My Lover & I	Antoinette dans les Cévennes
2021 (26th)	Filippo Meneghetti, Malysone Bovarasmy	Two of Us	Deux
2022 (27th)	Xavier Giannoli	Lost Illusions	Illusions perdues
2022 (27th)	Catherine Corsini	The Divide	La Fracture
2022 (27th)	Antoine Barraud	Madeleine Collins	
2022 (27th)	Arthur Harari, Vincent Poymiro	Onoda: 10,000 Nights in the Jungle	Onoda, 10 000 nuits dans la jungle
2022 (27th)	Leyla Bouzid	A Tale of Love and Desire	Une histoire d'amour et de désir
2023 (28th)	Dominik Moll, Gilles Marchand	The Night of the 12th	La Nuit du 12
2023 (28th)	Louis Garrel, Tanguy Viel	The Innocent	L'Innocent
2023 (28th)	Rebecca Zlotowski	Other People's Children	Les enfants des autres
2023 (28th)	Alice Diop, Marie NDiaye, Amrita David	Saint Omer	
2023 (28th)	Christophe Honoré	Winter Boy	Le Lycéen
2024 (29th)	Justine Triet, Arthur Harari	Anatomy of a Fall	Anatomie d'une chute
2024 (29th)	Thomas Cailley	The Animal Kingdom	Le Règne animal
2024 (29th)	Cédric Kahn, Nathalie Hertzberg	The Goldman Case	Le Procès Goldman
2024 (29th)	Iris Kaltenbäck	The Rapture	Le Ravissement
2024 (29th)	Quentin Dupieux	Yannick	
2025 (30th)	Jacques Audiard	Emilia Pérez	
2025 (30th)	Jonathan Millet and Florence Rochat	Ghost Trail	Les Fantômes
2025 (30th)	Alain Guiraudie	Misericordia	Miséricorde
2025 (30th)	Boris Lojkine and Delphine Agut	Souleymane's Story	L'Histoire de Souleymane
2025 (30th)	François Ozon	When Fall Is Coming	Quand vient l'automne
2026 (31st)	Stéphane Demoustier	The Great Arch	L'Inconnu de la Grande Arche
2026 (31st)	Holly Gent, Vince Palmo, Michèle Halberstadt and Laetitia Masson	Nouvelle Vague	
2026 (31st)	Pauline Loquès and Maud Ameline	Nino	
2026 (31st)	Dominik Moll and Gilles Marchand	Case 137	Dossier 137
2026 (31st)	François Ozon	The Stranger	L'Étranger

== See also ==
- César Award for Best Original Screenplay or Adaptation
  - César Award for Best Adaptation
  - César Award for Best Original Screenplay
