= Lumière Award for Best Film =

Annual French film award

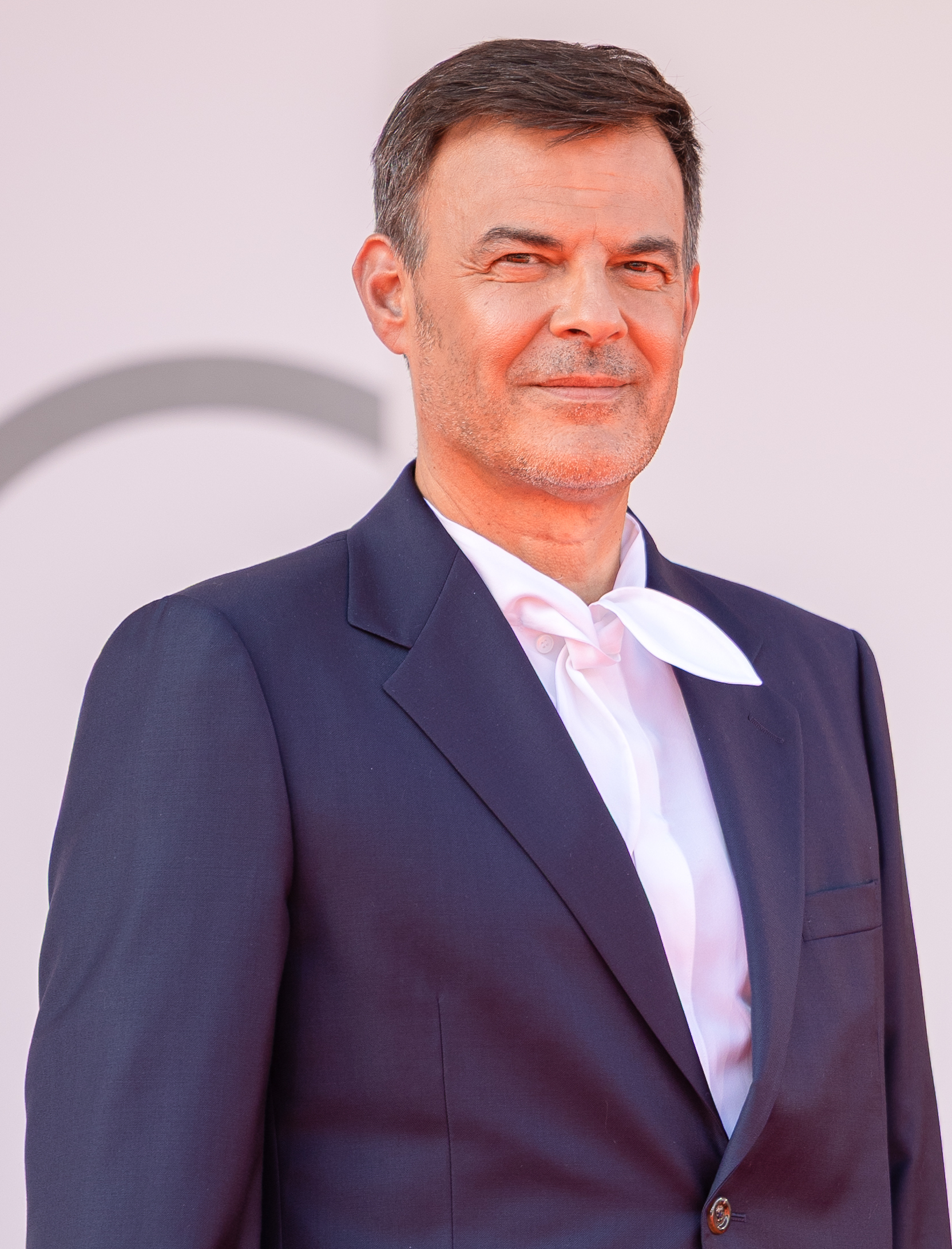
- 2026 recipient: François Ozon
- Country: France
- Presented by: Académie des Lumières
- First award: 1996
- Currently held by: The Stranger (2026)
- Website: academiedeslumieres.com

The Lumière Award for Best Film (French: Lumière du meilleur film) is an annual award presented by the Académie des Lumières since 1996.

== Notes ==
- ≠ indicates an Academy Award for Best Picture winner
- ≈ indicates an Academy Award for Best Picture nominee
- ± indicates a Palme d'Or winner

== Winners and nominees ==
In the following lists, the titles and names in bold with a blue background are the winners and recipients respectively; those not in bold are the nominees.

=== 1990s ===
Year	English title	Original title	Director (s)
1996 (1st)	**La Haine**		**Mathieu Kassovitz**
1997 (2nd)	**Ridicule**		**Patrice Leconte**
1998 (3rd)	**Marius and Jeannette**	**Marius et Jeannette**	**Robert Guédiguian**
1999 (4th)	**The Dreamlife of Angels**	**La Vie rêvée des anges**	**Erick Zonca**

=== 2000s ===
Year	English title	Original title	Director (s)
2000 (5th)	**The Messenger: The Story of Joan of Arc**	**Jeanne d'Arc**	**Luc Besson**
2001 (6th)	**The Taste of Others**	**Le Goût des autres**	**Agnès Jaoui**
2002 (7th)	**Amélie**	**Le Fabuleux Destin d'Amélie Poulain**	**Jean-Pierre Jeunet**
2003 (8th)	**Amen.**		**Costa-Gavras**
2004 (9th)	**The Triplets of Belleville**	**Les Triplettes de Belleville**	**Sylvain Chomet**
2005 (10th)	**The Chorus**	**Les Choristes**	**Christophe Barratier**
2006 (11th)	**The Beat That My Heart Skipped**	**De battre mon cœur s'est arrêté**	**Jacques Audiard**
2007 (12th)	**Tell No One**	**Ne le dis à personne**	**Guillaume Canet**
2007 (12th)	Days of Glory	Indigènes	Rachid Bouchareb
2007 (12th)	Comedy of Power	L'Ivresse du pouvoir	Claude Chabrol
2007 (12th)	Lady Chatterley		Pascale Ferran
2007 (12th)	Flanders	Flandres	Bruno Dumont
2008 (13th)	**The Diving Bell and the Butterfly**	**Le Scaphandre et le Papillon**	**Julian Schnabel**
2008 (13th)	La Vie en Rose	La môme	Olivier Dahan
2008 (13th)	The Secret of the Grain	La Graine et le Mulet	Abdellatif Kechiche
2008 (13th)	Persepolis		Marjane Satrapi and Vincent Paronnaud
2008 (13th)	Room of Death	La Chambre des morts	Alfred Lot
2009 (14th)	**The Class**±	**Entre les murs**	**Laurent Cantet**
2009 (14th)	Mesrine: Killer Instinct	Mesrine: L'Instinct de mort	Jean-François Richet
2009 (14th)	Mesrine: Public Enemy Number One	Mesrine: L'Ennemi public n° 1	Jean-François Richet
2009 (14th)	A Christmas Tale	Un conte de Noël	Arnaud Desplechin
2009 (14th)	Séraphine		Martin Provost
2009 (14th)	With a Little Help from Myself	Aide-toi, le ciel t'aidera	François Dupeyron

=== 2010s ===
Year	English title	Original title	Director (s)
2010 (15th)	**Welcome**		**Philippe Lioret**
2010 (15th)	A Prophet	Un prophète	Jacques Audiard
2010 (15th)	In the Electric Mist	Dans la brume électrique	Bertrand Tavernier
2010 (15th)	Coco Before Chanel	Coco avant Chanel	Anne Fontaine
2010 (15th)	In the Beginning	À l'origine	Xavier Giannoli
2011 (16th)	**Of Gods and Men**	**Des hommes et des dieux**	**Xavier Beauvois**
2011 (16th)	The Illusionist	L'Illusionniste	Sylvain Chomet
2011 (16th)	The Ghost Writer		Roman Polanski
2011 (16th)	Gainsbourg: A Heroic Life	Gainsbourg, vie héroïque	Joann Sfar
2011 (16th)	Carlos		Olivier Assayas
2012 (17th)	**The Artist**≠		**Michel Hazanavicius**
2012 (17th)	Le Havre		Aki Kaurismäki
2012 (17th)	The Minister	L'Exercice de l'Etat	Pierre Schöller
2012 (17th)	The Intouchables	Intouchables	Olivier Nakache and Éric Toledano
2012 (17th)	House of Tolerance	L'Apollonide: Souvenirs de la maison close	Bertrand Bonello
2013 (18th)	**Amour**≈ ±		**Michael Haneke**
2013 (18th)	Rust and Bone	De rouille et d'os	Jacques Audiard
2013 (18th)	Farewell, My Queen	Les Adieux à la reine	Benoît Jacquot
2013 (18th)	Camille Rewinds	Camille Redouble	Noémie Lvovsky
2013 (18th)	Holy Motors		Leos Carax
2014 (19th)	**Blue Is the Warmest Colour**±	**La Vie d'Adèle – Chapitres 1 & 2**	**Abdellatif Kechiche**
2014 (19th)	Mood Indigo	L'Ecume des jours	Michel Gondry
2014 (19th)	The French Minister	Quai d'Orsay	Bertrand Tavernier
2014 (19th)	Renoir		Gilles Bourdos
2014 (19th)	Grand Central		Rebecca Zlotowski
2014 (19th)	9 Month Stretch	9 mois ferme	Albert Dupontel
2015 (20th)	**Timbuktu**		**Abderrahmane Sissako**
2015 (20th)	Girlhood	Bande de filles	Céline Sciamma
2015 (20th)	The Bélier Family	La Famille Bélier	Éric Lartigau
2015 (20th)	Not My Type	Pas son genre	Lucas Belvaux
2015 (20th)	Saint Laurent		Bertrand Bonello
2015 (20th)	Three Hearts	3 cœurs	Benoît Jacquot
2016 (21st)	**Mustang**		**Deniz Gamze Ergüven**
2016 (21st)	Summertime	La Belle Saison	Catherine Corsini
2016 (21st)	Dheepan±		Jacques Audiard
2016 (21st)	Courted	L'Hermine	Christian Vincent
2016 (21st)	Marguerite		Xavier Giannoli
2016 (21st)	My Golden Days	Trois souvenirs de ma jeunesse	Arnaud Desplechin
2017 (22nd)	**Elle**		**Paul Verhoeven**
2017 (22nd)	The Death of Louis XIV	La Mort de Louis XIV	Albert Serra
2017 (22nd)	Nocturama		Bertrand Bonello
2017 (22nd)	Les Ogres		Léa Fehner
2017 (22nd)	Staying Vertical	Rester vertical	Alain Guiraudie
2017 (22nd)	A Woman's Life	Une vie	Stéphane Brizé
2018 (23rd)	**BPM (Beats per Minute)**	**120 battements par minute**	**Robin Campillo**
2018 (23rd)	See You Up There	Au revoir là-haut	Albert Dupontel
2018 (23rd)	Barbara		Mathieu Amalric
2018 (23rd)	Félicité		Alain Gomis
2018 (23rd)	Orphan	Orpheline	Arnaud des Pallières
2018 (23rd)	C'est la vie!	Le Sens de la fête	Éric Toledano and Olivier Nakache
2019 (24th)	**The Sisters Brothers**	**Les Frères Sisters**	**Jacques Audiard**
2019 (24th)	Amanda		Mikhaël Hers
2019 (24th)	Guy		Alex Lutz
2019 (24th)	Lady J	Mademoiselle de Joncquières	Emmanuel Mouret
2019 (24th)	In Safe Hands	Pupille	Jeanne Herry

=== 2020s ===
Year	English title	Original title	Director (s)
2020 (25th)	**Les Misérables**		**Ladj Ly**
2020 (25th)	By the Grace of God	Grâce à Dieu	François Ozon
2020 (25th)	An Officer and a Spy	J'Accuse	Roman Polanski
2020 (25th)	Portrait of a Lady on Fire	Portrait de la jeune fille en feu	Céline Sciamma
2020 (25th)	Oh Mercy!	Roubaix, une lumière	Arnaud Desplechin
2021 (26th)	**Love Affair(s)**	**Les Choses qu'on dit, les choses qu'on fait**	**Emmanuel Mouret**
2021 (26th)	Bye Bye Morons	Adieu les cons	Albert Dupontel
2021 (26th)	The Girl with a Bracelet	La Fille au bracelet	Stéphane Demoustier
2021 (26th)	Summer of 85	Été 85	François Ozon
2021 (26th)	Two of Us	Deux	Filippo Meneghetti
2022 (27th)	**Happening**	**L'Événement**	**Audrey Diwan**
2022 (27th)	Annette		Leos Carax
2022 (27th)	Lost Illusions	Illusions perdues	Xavier Giannoli
2022 (27th)	Peaceful	De son vivant	Emmanuelle Bercot
2022 (27th)	Onoda: 10,000 Nights in the Jungle	Onoda, 10 000 nuits dans la jungle	Arthur Harari
2023 (28th)	**The Night of the 12th**	**La Nuit du 12**	**Dominik Moll**
2023 (28th)	Other People's Children	Les Enfants des autres	Rebecca Zlotowski
2023 (28th)	Pacifiction	Pacifiction – Tourment sur les îles	Albert Serra
2023 (28th)	Paris Memories	Revoir Paris	Alice Winocour
2023 (28th)	Saint Omer		Alice Diop
2024 (29th)	**Anatomy of a Fall**≈ ±	**Anatomie d'une chute**	**Justine Triet**
2024 (29th)	Last Summer	L'Été dernier	Catherine Breillat
2024 (29th)	Sons of Ramses	Goutte d'or	Clément Cogitore
2024 (29th)	The Goldman Case	Le Procès Goldman	Cédric Kahn
2024 (29th)	The Animal Kingdom	Le Règne animal	Thomas Cailley
2025 (30th)	**Emilia Pérez**≈		**Jacques Audiard**
2025 (30th)	All We Imagine as Light		Payal Kapadia
2025 (30th)	Jim's Story	Le Roman de Jim	Arnaud Larrieu and Jean-Marie Larrieu
2025 (30th)	Misericordia	Miséricorde	Alain Guiraudie
2025 (30th)	Souleymane's Story	L'Histoire de Souleymane	Boris Lojkine
2026 (31st)	**The Stranger**	**L'Étranger**	**François Ozon**
2026 (31st)	Case 137	Dossier 137	Dominik Moll
2026 (31st)	The Great Arch	L'Inconnu de la Grande Arche	Stéphane Demoustier
2026 (31st)	Mektoub, My Love: Canto Due		Abdellatif Kechiche
2026 (31st)	Nouvelle Vague		Richard Linklater

== See also ==
- César Award for Best Film
- Louis Delluc Prize for Best Film
- Prix du Syndicat Français de la Critique de Cinéma — Best French Film
