= Lumière Award for Best Director =

Annual French film award

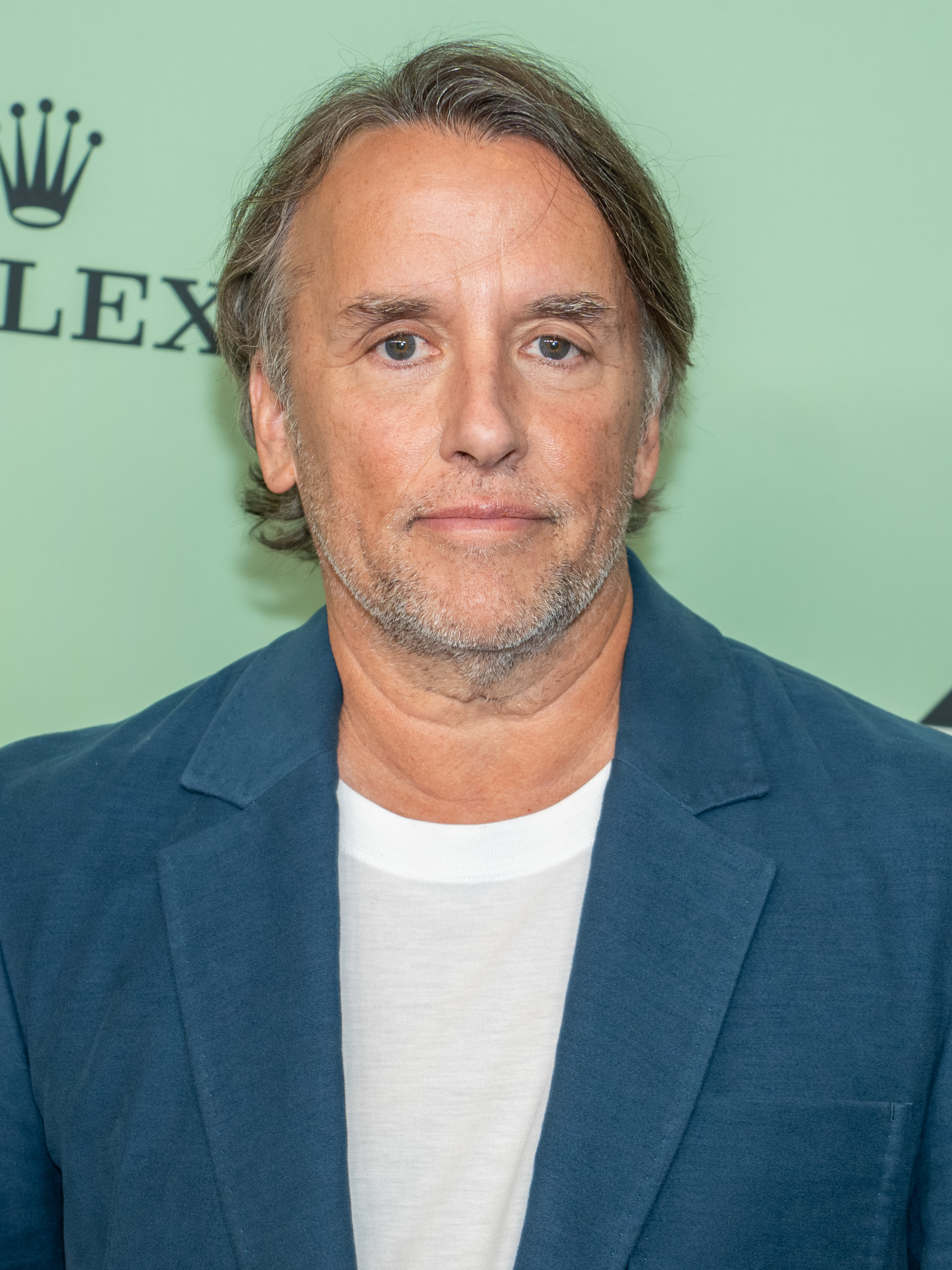
- 2026 recipient: Richard Linklater
- Country: France
- Presented by: Académie des Lumières
- First award: 1996
- Currently held by: Richard Linklater for Nouvelle Vague (2026)
- Website: academiedeslumieres.com

The Lumière Award for Best Director (French: Lumière de la meilleure mise en scène) is an award presented annually by the Académie des Lumières since 1996. It was presented as the Lumière du meilleur réalisateur from 1996 to 2019.

== Winners and nominees ==
Winners are listed first with a blue background, followed by the other nominees.

=== 1990s ===
Year	Winner	English title	Original title
1996 (1st)	Mathieu Kassovitz	La Haine	
1997 (2nd)	Cédric Klapisch	Family Resemblances	Un air de famille
1998 (3rd)	Luc Besson	The Fifth Element	Le Cinquième Élément
1999 (4th)	Erick Zonca	The Dreamlife of Angels	La Vie rêvée des anges

=== 2000s ===
Year	Winner	English title	Original title
2000 (5th)	Luc Besson	The Messenger: The Story of Joan of Arc	Jeanne d'Arc
2001 (6th)	Agnès Jaoui	The Taste of Others	Le Goût des autres
2002 (7th)	Patrice Chéreau	Intimacy	Intimité
2003 (8th)	François Ozon	8 Women	8 femmes
2004 (9th)	Alain Resnais	Not on the Lips	Pas sur la bouche
2005 (10th)	Jean-Pierre Jeunet	A Very Long Engagement	Un long dimanche de fiançailles
2006 (11th)	Philippe Garrel	Regular Lovers	Les Amants réguliers
2007 (12th)	Pascale Ferran	Lady Chatterley	
2007 (12th)	Alain Resnais	Private Fears in Public Places	Cœurs
2007 (12th)	Claude Chabrol	Comedy of Power	L'Ivresse du pouvoir
2007 (12th)	Guillaume Canet	Tell No One	Ne le dis à personne
2007 (12th)	Bruno Dumont	Flanders	Flandres
2008 (13th)	Abdellatif Kechiche	The Secret of the Grain	La Graine et le Mulet
2008 (13th)	André Téchiné	The Witnesses	Les Témoins
2008 (13th)	Olivier Dahan	La Vie en Rose	La môme
2008 (13th)	Julian Schnabel	The Diving Bell and the Butterfly	Le Scaphandre et le Papillon
2008 (13th)	Alfred Lot	Room of Death	La Chambre des morts
2009 (14th)	François Dupeyron	With a Little Help from Myself	Aide-toi, le ciel t'aidera
2009 (14th)	Arnaud Desplechin	A Christmas Tale	Un conte de Noël
2009 (14th)	Laurent Cantet	The Class	Entre les murs
2009 (14th)	Jean-François Richet	Mesrine: Killer Instinct	Mesrine: L'Instinct de mort
2009 (14th)	Jean-François Richet	Mesrine: Public Enemy Number One	Mesrine: L'Ennemi public n° 1
2009 (14th)	Martin Provost	Séraphine	

=== 2010s ===
Year	Winner	English title	Original title
2010 (15th)	Jacques Audiard	A Prophet	Un prophète
2010 (15th)	Bertrand Tavernier	In the Electric Mist	Dans la brume électrique
2010 (15th)	Anne Fontaine	Coco Before Chanel	Coco avant Chanel
2010 (15th)	Philippe Lioret	Welcome	
2010 (15th)	Xavier Giannoli	In the Beginning	À l'origine
2011 (16th)	Roman Polanski	The Ghost Writer	
2011 (16th)	Xavier Beauvois	Of Gods and Men	Des hommes et des dieux
2011 (16th)	Olivier Assayas	Carlos	
2011 (16th)	Mathieu Amalric	On Tour	Tournée
2011 (16th)	Joann Sfar	Gainsbourg: A Heroic Life	Gainsbourg, vie héroïque
2012 (17th)	Maïwenn	Polisse	
2012 (17th)	Aki Kaurismäki	Le Havre	
2012 (17th)	Michel Hazanavicius	The Artist	
2012 (17th)	Bertrand Bonello	House of Tolerance	L'Apollonide : Souvenirs de la maison close
2012 (17th)	Pierre Schoeller	The Minister	L'Exercice de l'Etat
2013 (18th)	Jacques Audiard	Rust and Bone	De rouille et d'os
2013 (18th)	Noémie Lvovsky	Camille Rewinds	Camille Redouble
2013 (18th)	Michael Haneke	Amour	
2013 (18th)	Leos Carax	Holy Motors	
2013 (18th)	Cyril Mennegun	Louise Wimmer	
2014 (19th)	Abdellatif Kechiche	Blue Is the Warmest Colour	La Vie d'Adèle – Chapitres 1 & 2
2014 (19th)	Bertrand Tavernier	The French Minister	Quai d'Orsay
2014 (19th)	Albert Dupontel	9 Month Stretch	9 mois ferme
2014 (19th)	Gilles Bourdos	Renoir	
2014 (19th)	Michel Gondry	Mood Indigo	L'Ecume des jours
2014 (19th)	Rebecca Zlotowski	Grand Central	
2015 (20th)	Abderrahmane Sissako	Timbuktu	
2015 (20th)	Lucas Belvaux	Not My Type	Pas son genre
2015 (20th)	Bertrand Bonello	Saint Laurent	
2015 (20th)	Benoît Jacquot	Three Hearts	3 cœurs
2015 (20th)	Cédric Kahn	Wild Life	Vie sauvage
2015 (20th)	Céline Sciamma	Girlhood	Bande de filles
2016 (21st)	Arnaud Desplechin	My Golden Days	Trois souvenirs de ma jeunesse
2016 (21st)	Jacques Audiard	Dheepan	
2016 (21st)	Catherine Corsini	Summertime	La Belle Saison
2016 (21st)	Philippe Garrel	In the Shadow of Women	L'Ombre des femmes
2016 (21st)	Xavier Giannoli	Marguerite	
2016 (21st)	Maïwenn	Mon roi	
2017 (22nd)	Paul Verhoeven	Elle	
2017 (22nd)	Bertrand Bonello	Nocturama	
2017 (22nd)	Stéphane Brizé	A Woman's Life	Une vie
2017 (22nd)	Léa Fehner	Les Ogres	
2017 (22nd)	Alain Guiraudie	Staying Vertical	Rester vertical
2017 (22nd)	Albert Serra	The Death of Louis XIV	La Mort de Louis XIV
2018 (23rd)	Robin Campillo	BPM (Beats per Minute)	120 battements par minute
2018 (23rd)	Mathieu Amalric	Barbara	
2018 (23rd)	Laurent Cantet	The Workshop	L'Atelier
2018 (23rd)	Philippe Garrel	Lover for a Day	L'Amant d'un jour
2018 (23rd)	Alain Gomis	Félicité	
2018 (23rd)	Michel Hazanavicius	Redoubtable	Le Redoutable
2019 (24th)	Jacques Audiard	The Sisters Brothers	Les Frères Sisters
2019 (24th)	Jeanne Herry	In Safe Hands	Pupille
2019 (24th)	Xavier Legrand	Custody	Jusqu'à la garde
2019 (24th)	Gaspar Noé	Climax	
2019 (24th)	Pierre Salvadori	The Trouble with You	En liberté !

=== 2020s ===
Year	Winner	English title	Original title
2020 (25th)	Roman Polanski	An Officer and a Spy	J'accuse
2020 (25th)	Jérémy Clapin	I Lost My Body	J'ai perdu mon corps
2020 (25th)	Arnaud Desplechin	Oh Mercy!	Roubaix, une lumière
2020 (25th)	Ladj Ly	Les Misérables	
2020 (25th)	Céline Sciamma	Portrait of a Lady on Fire	Portrait de la jeune fille en feu
2021 (26th)	Maïwenn	DNA	ADN
2021 (26th)	Albert Dupontel	Bye Bye Morons	Adieu les cons
2021 (26th)	Filippo Meneghetti	Two of Us	Deux
2021 (26th)	Emmanuel Mouret	Love Affair(s)	Les Choses qu'on dit, les choses qu'on fait
2021 (26th)	François Ozon	Summer of 85	Été 85
2022 (27th)	Leos Carax	Annette	
2022 (27th)	Jacques Audiard	Paris, 13th District	Les Olympiades
2022 (27th)	Audrey Diwan	Happening	L'Événement
2022 (27th)	Xavier Giannoli	Lost Illusions	Illusions perdues
2022 (27th)	Arthur Harari	Onoda: 10,000 Nights in the Jungle	Onoda, 10 000 nuits dans la jungle
2023 (28th)	Albert Serra	Pacifiction	Pacifiction – Tourment sur les îles
2023 (28th)	Rebecca Zlotowski	Other People's Children	Les Enfants des autres
2023 (28th)	Dominik Moll	The Night of the 12th	La Nuit du 12
2023 (28th)	Valeria Bruni Tedeschi	Forever Young	Les Amandiers
2023 (28th)	Gaspar Noé	Vortex	
2024 (29th)	Thomas Cailley	The Animal Kingdom	Le Règne animal
2024 (29th)	Catherine Breillat	Last Summer	L'Été dernier
2024 (29th)	Clément Cogitore	Sons of Ramses	Goutte d'or
2024 (29th)	Cédric Kahn	The Goldman Case	Le Procès Goldman
2024 (29th)	Justine Triet	Anatomy of a Fall	Anatomie d'une chute
2025 (30th)	Jacques Audiard	Emilia Pérez	
2025 (30th)	Matthieu Delaporte and Alexandre de La Patellière	The Count of Monte Cristo	Le Comte de Monte-Cristo
2025 (30th)	Alain Guiraudie	Misericordia	Miséricorde
2025 (30th)	Boris Lojkine	Souleymane's Story	L'Histoire de Souleymane
2025 (30th)	François Ozon	When Fall Is Coming	Quand vient l'automne
2026 (31st)	Richard Linklater	Nouvelle Vague	
2026 (31st)	Stéphane Demoustier	The Great Arch	L'Inconnu de la Grande Arche
2026 (31st)	Abdellatif Kechiche	Mektoub, My Love: Canto Due	
2026 (31st)	Dominik Moll	Case 137	Dossier 137
2026 (31st)	François Ozon	The Stranger	L'Étranger

== Trivia ==
=== Multiple awards ===
==== 4 awards ====
- Jacques Audiard

==== 2 awards ====
- Luc Besson
- Abdellatif Kechiche
- Maïwenn
- Roman Polanski

=== Multiple nominees ===
==== 6 nominations ====
- Jacques Audiard

==== 4 nominations ====
- François Ozon

==== 3 nominations ====
- Bertrand Bonello
- Arnaud Desplechin
- Philippe Garrel
- Xavier Giannoli
- Abdellatif Kechiche
- Maïwenn

==== 2 nominations ====
- Mathieu Amalric
- Luc Besson
- Laurent Cantet
- Leos Carax
- Albert Dupontel
- Alain Guiraudie
- Michel Hazanavicius
- Cédric Kahn
- Abdellatif Kechiche
- Dominik Moll
- Gaspar Noé
- Roman Polanski
- Alain Resnais
- Céline Sciamma
- Albert Serra
- Bertrand Tavernier
- Rebecca Zlotowski

== See also ==
- César Award for Best Director
- Academy Award for Best Director
