= Lumière Award for Best Actress =

Annual French film award

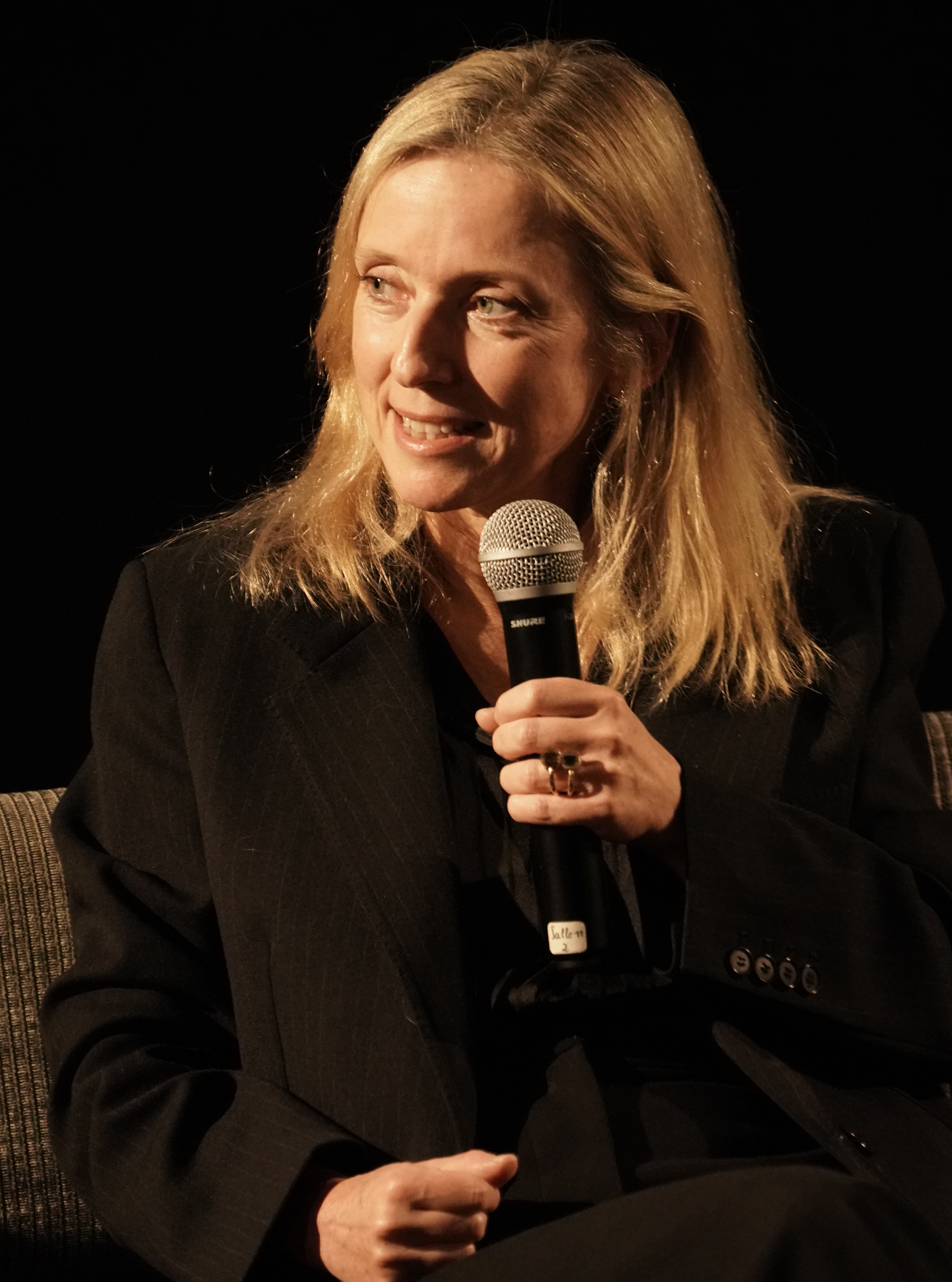
- 2026 recipient: Léa Drucker
- Country: France
- Presented by: Académie des Lumières
- First award: 1996
- Currently held by: Léa Drucker for Case 137 (2026)
- Website: academiedeslumieres.com

The Lumière Award for Best Actress (French: Lumière de la meilleure actrice) is an annual award presented by the Académie des Lumières since 1996.

Isabelle Huppert was the first winner for La Cérémonie in 1996, while Léa Drucker is the most recent winner for Case 137 in 2026.

== Winners and nominees ==
Winners are listed first with a blue background, followed by the other nominees.

=== 1990s ===
Year	Winner	English title	Original title
1996 (1st)	Isabelle Huppert	La Cérémonie	
1997 (2nd)	Fanny Ardant	Ridicule	
1998 (3rd)	Miou-Miou	Dry Cleaning	Nettoyage à sec
1999 (4th)	Élodie Bouchez	The Dreamlife of Angels	La Vie rêvée des anges

=== 2000s ===
Year	Winner	English title	Original title
2000 (5th)	Karin Viard	Haut les cœurs!	
2001 (6th)	Isabelle Huppert	Merci pour le chocolat	
2002 (7th)	Audrey Tautou	Amélie	Le Fabuleux destin d'Amélie Poulain
2003 (8th)	Isabelle Carré	Beautiful Memories	Se souvenir des belles choses
2004 (9th)	Sylvie Testud	Fear and Trembling	Stupeur et tremblements
2005 (10th)	Emmanuelle Devos	Kings and Queen	Rois et Reine
2006 (11th)	Isabelle Huppert	Gabrielle	
2007 (12th)	Marina Hands	Lady Chatterley	
2007 (12th)	Danielle Darrieux	Nouvelle chance	
2007 (12th)	Sabine Azéma	Private Fears in Public Places	Cœurs
2007 (12th)	Isabelle Huppert	Comedy of Power	L'Ivresse du pouvoir
2007 (12th)	Marina de Van	Made in Paris	Je pense à vous
2008 (13th)	Marion Cotillard	La Vie en Rose	La môme
2008 (13th)	Mélanie Laurent	Room of Death	La Chambre des morts
2008 (13th)	Sylvie Testud	The Vanishing Point	Ce que mes yeux ont vu
2008 (13th)	Ludivine Sagnier	A Girl Cut in Two	La Fille coupée en deux
2008 (13th)	Marina Foïs	Darling	
2009 (14th)	Yolande Moreau	Séraphine	
2009 (14th)	Catherine Frot	Mark of an Angel	L'Empreinte de l'ange
2009 (14th)	Felicite Wouassi	With a Little Help from Myself	Aide-toi, le ciel t'aidera
2009 (14th)	Kristin Scott Thomas	I've Loved You So Long	Il y a longtemps que je t'aime
2009 (14th)	Sylvie Testud	Sagan	

=== 2010s ===
Year	Winner	English title	Original title
2010 (15th)	Isabelle Adjani	La Journée de la jupe	
2010 (15th)	Sandrine Kiberlain	Mademoiselle Chambon	
2010 (15th)	Dominique Blanc	The Other One	L'Autre
2010 (15th)	Valeria Bruni Tedeschi	Regrets	Les Regrets
2010 (15th)	Audrey Tautou	Coco Before Chanel	Coco avant Chanel
2011 (16th)	Kristin Scott Thomas	Sarah's Key	Elle s'appelait Sarah
2011 (16th)	Catherine Deneuve	Potiche	
2011 (16th)	Juliette Binoche	Certified Copy	Copie conforme
2011 (16th)	Isabelle Carré	Romantics Anonymous	Les Émotifs anonymes
2011 (16th)	Ludivine Sagnier	Lily Sometimes	Pieds nus sur les limaces
2012 (17th)	Bérénice Bejo	The Artist	
2012 (17th)	Catherine Deneuve	Beloved	Les Bien-aimés
2012 (17th)	Karin Viard	Polisse	
2012 (17th)	Chiara Mastroianni	Beloved	Les Bien-aimés
2012 (17th)	Marina Foïs	Polisse	
2012 (17th)	Valérie Donzelli	Declaration of War	La Guerre est déclarée
2012 (17th)	Clotilde Hesme	Angel & Tony	Angèle et Tony
2013 (18th)	Emmanuelle Riva	Amour	
2013 (18th)	Catherine Frot	Haute Cuisine	Les Saveurs du palais
2013 (18th)	Noémie Lvovsky	Camille Rewinds	Camille Redouble
2013 (18th)	Marion Cotillard	Rust and Bone	De rouille et d'os
2013 (18th)	Corinne Masiero	Louise Wimmer	
2014 (19th)	Léa Seydoux	Blue Is the Warmest Colour	La Vie d'Adèle – Chapitres 1 & 2
2014 (19th)	Léa Seydoux	Grand Central	
2014 (19th)	Catherine Deneuve	On My Way	Elle s'en va
2014 (19th)	Sandrine Kiberlain	9 Month Stretch	9 mois ferme
2014 (19th)	Emmanuelle Seigner	Venus in Fur	La Vénus à la fourrure
2014 (19th)	Christa Theret	Renoir	
2015 (20th)	Karin Viard	The Bélier Family	La Famille Bélier
2015 (20th)	Karin Viard	Lulu femme nue	
2015 (20th)	Juliette Binoche	Clouds of Sils Maria	Sils Maria
2015 (20th)	Emilie Dequenne	Not My Type	Pas son genre
2015 (20th)	Charlotte Gainsbourg	Three Hearts	3 cœurs
2015 (20th)	Charlotte Gainsbourg	Samba	
2015 (20th)	Adèle Haenel	Love at First Fight	Les Combattants
2015 (20th)	Adèle Haenel	In the Name of My Daughter	L'Homme qu'on aimait trop
2015 (20th)	Sandrine Kiberlain	Elle l'adore	
2016 (21st)	Catherine Frot	Marguerite	
2016 (21st)	Emmanuelle Bercot	Mon roi	
2016 (21st)	Clotilde Courau	In the Shadow of Women	L'Ombre des femmes
2016 (21st)	Izïa Higelin	Summertime	La Belle Saison
2016 (21st)	Isabelle Huppert	Valley of Love	
2016 (21st)	Elsa Zylberstein	Un plus une	
2017 (22nd)	Isabelle Huppert	Elle	
2017 (22nd)	Judith Chemla	A Woman's Life	Une vie
2017 (22nd)	Marion Cotillard	From the Land of the Moon	Mal de pierres
2017 (22nd)	Virginie Efira	In Bed with Victoria	Victoria
2017 (22nd)	Sidse Babett Knudsen	150 Milligrams	La Fille de Brest
2017 (22nd)	Soko	The Dancer	La Danseuse
2018 (23rd)	Jeanne Balibar	Barbara	Barbara
2018 (23rd)	Hiam Abbass	Insyriated	Une famille syrienne
2018 (23rd)	Juliette Binoche	Let the Sunshine In	Un beau soleil intérieur
2018 (23rd)	Emmanuelle Devos	Number One	Numéro une
2018 (23rd)	Charlotte Gainsbourg	Promise at Dawn	La Promesse de l'aube
2018 (23rd)	Karin Viard	Jalouse	
2019 (24th)	Élodie Bouchez	In Safe Hands	Pupille
2019 (24th)	Cécile de France	Mademoiselle de Joncquières	Mademoiselle de Joncquières
2019 (24th)	Léa Drucker	Custody	Jusqu'à la garde
2019 (24th)	Virginie Efira	An Impossible Love	Un amour impossible
2019 (24th)	Mélanie Thierry	Memoir of War	La Douleur

=== 2020s ===
Year	Winner	English title	Original title
2020 (25th)	Noémie Merlant	Portrait of a Lady on Fire	Portrait de la jeune fille en feu
2020 (25th)	Fanny Ardant	La Belle Époque	
2020 (25th)	Anaïs Demoustier	Alice and the Mayor	Alice et le Maire
2020 (25th)	Eva Green	Proxima	
2020 (25th)	Karin Viard	Perfect Nanny	Chanson douce
2021 (26th)	Martine Chevallier	Two of Us	Deux
2021 (26th)	Barbara Sukowa	Two of Us	Deux
2021 (26th)	Laure Calamy	My Donkey, My Lover & I	Antoinette dans les Cévennes
2021 (26th)	Emmanuelle Devos	Perfumes	Les Parfums
2021 (26th)	Virginie Efira	Bye Bye Morons	Adieu les cons
2021 (26th)	Camélia Jordana	Love Affair(s)	Les Choses qu'on dit, les choses qu'on fait
2022 (27th)	Anamaria Vartolomei	Happening	L'Événement
2022 (27th)	Suliane Brahim	The Swarm	La Nuée
2022 (27th)	Virginie Efira	Benedetta	
2022 (27th)	Valérie Lemercier	Aline	
2022 (27th)	Sophie Marceau	Everything Went Fine	Tout s'est bien passé
2023 (28th)	Virginie Efira	Other People's Children	Les Enfants des autres
2023 (28th)	Françoise Lebrun	Vortex	
2023 (28th)	Noémie Merlant	The Innocent	L'Innocent
2023 (28th)	Juliette Binoche	Between Two Worlds	Ouistreham
2023 (28th)	Laure Calamy	Full Time	À plein temps
2024 (29th)	Sandra Hüller	Anatomy of a Fall	Anatomie d'une chute
2024 (29th)	Catherine Deneuve	Bernadette	
2024 (29th)	Léa Drucker	Last Summer	L'Été dernier
2024 (29th)	Virginie Efira	All to Play For	Rien à perdre
2024 (29th)	Hafsia Herzi	The Rapture	Le Ravissement
2025 (30th)	Karla Sofía Gascón	Emilia Pérez	
2025 (30th)	Hafsia Herzi	Borgo	
2025 (30th)	Agnès Jaoui	This Life of Mine	Ma vie ma gueule
2025 (30th)	Anamaria Vartolomei	Being Maria	Maria
2025 (30th)	Hélène Vincent	When Fall Is Coming	Quand vient l'automne
2026 (31st)	Léa Drucker	Case 137	Dossier 137
2026 (31st)	Jodie Foster	A Private Life	Vie privée
2026 (31st)	Isabelle Huppert	The Richest Woman In The World	La femme la plus riche du monde
2026 (31st)	Vicky Krieps	Love Me Tender	
2026 (31st)	Mélanie Thierry	Mariana’s Room	La chambre de Mariana

== Trivia ==
=== Multiple awards ===
==== 4 awards ====
- Isabelle Huppert

==== 2 awards ====
- Élodie Bouchez
- Karin Viard

=== Multiple nominees ===
==== 7 nominations ====
- Isabelle Huppert

==== 6 nominations ====
- Virginie Efira

=== 5 nominations ===
- Karin Viard

==== 4 nominations ====
- Juliette Binoche
- Catherine Deneuve

==== 3 nominations ====
- Marion Cotillard
- Emmanuelle Devos
- Léa Drucker
- Catherine Frot
- Sandrine Kiberlain
- Sylvie Testud

==== 2 nominations ====
- Fanny Ardant
- Élodie Bouchez
- Laure Calamy
- Isabelle Carré
- Marina Foïs
- Charlotte Gainsbourg
- Hafsia Herzi
- Noémie Merlant
- Ludivine Sagnier
- Kristin Scott Thomas
- Audrey Tautou
- Mélanie Thierry
- Anamaria Vartolomei

== See also ==
- César Award for Best Actress
