= 12th Lumière Awards =

2007 French film awards ceremony

- Date: 5 February 2007
- Site: Espace Pierre Cardin, Paris, France

Highlights
- Best Film: Tell No One
- Best Director: Pascale Ferran
- Best Actor: Gérard Depardieu
- Best Actress: Marina Hands

The 12th Lumière Awards ceremony, presented by the Académie des Lumières, was held on 5 February 2007, at the Espace Pierre Cardin in Paris. The ceremony was chaired by Isabelle Mergault. Tell No One won the award for Best Film.

== Winners and nominees ==
Winners are listed first and highlighted in bold.

Best Film	Best Director
**Tell No One**: Days of Glory; Comedy of Power; Lady Chatterley; Flanders	**Pascale Ferran — Lady Chatterley**: Alain Resnais — Private Fears in Public Places; Claude Chabrol — Comedy of Power; Guillaume Canet — Tell No One; Bruno Dumont — Flanders
Best Actor	Best Actress
**Gérard Depardieu — When I Was a Singer**: Lambert Wilson — Private Fears in Public Places; François Cluzet — Tell No One; Michel Blanc — You Are So Beautiful; Sacha Bourdo — The Soldier's Star	**Marina Hands — Lady Chatterley**: Danielle Darrieux — Nouvelle chance; Sabine Azéma — Private Fears in Public Places; Isabelle Huppert — Comedy of Power; Marina de Van — Made in Paris
Most Promising Actor	Most Promising Actress
**Julien Boisselier** — Don't Worry, I'm Fine: Bernard Blancan — Days of Glory; Jean-Louis Coulloc'h — Lady Chatterley; Malik Zidi — Les Amitiés maléfiques; Thibault Vinçon — Les Amitiés maléfiques	**Mélanie Laurent** — Don't Worry, I'm Fine: Sandrine Le Berre — Coup de sang; Medeea Marinescu — You Are So Beautiful; Déborah François — The Page Turner; Nina Kervel-Bey — Blame It on Fidel
Best Screenplay	Best French-Language Film
**Days of Glory — Rachid Bouchareb and Olivier Lorelle**: You Are So Beautiful — Isabelle Mergault; Comedy of Power — Odile Barski and Claude Chabrol; Tell No One — Guillaume Canet and Philippe Lefebvre; Blame It on Fidel — Julie Gavras	**Bamako**: The United States of Albert (Les États-Unis d'Albert); C.R.A.Z.Y.; Bunker Paradise; Barakat!
World Audience Award (presented by TV5Monde)
**Tell No One** — **Guillaume Canet**

== See also ==
- 32nd César Awards
