= Other People's Children (2022 film) =

2022 film by Rebecca Zlotowski

- Theatrical release poster
- French: Les Enfants des autres
- Directed by: Rebecca Zlotowski
- Written by: Rebecca Zlotowski
- Produced by: Frédéric Jouve; Marie Lecoq
- Starring: Virginie Efira; Roschdy Zem; Chiara Mastroianni; Callie Ferreira-Goncalves
- Cinematography: George Lechaptois
- Edited by: Géraldine Mangenot
- Music by: ROB
- Production companies: Les Films Velvet; France 3 Cinéma
- Distributed by: Ad Vitam
- Release dates: 4 September 2022 (Venice); 21 September 2022 (France)
- Running time: 104 minutes
- Country: France
- Language: French
- Box office: est. US$3 million

Other People's Children (French: Les Enfants des autres) is a 2022 French drama film directed by Rebecca Zlotowski, starring Virginie Efira, Roschdy Zem, Chiara Mastroianni and Callie Ferreira-Goncalves. The tragic comedy tells the story of a middle-aged teacher who starts a new relationship. She forms a close bond with the young daughter of her partner.

The film had its premiere on September 4, 2022 at the 79th Venice International Film Festival and competed for Golden Lion award. It was theatrical released in France on 21 September 2022.

== Synopsis ==
Rachel is 40 years old, single and has no children. She is working as a teacher at a middle school, and has a large circle of friends and also keeps in touch with her ex-husband. She takes guitar lessons and is happy with her life.

She falls in love with Ali and his four-year-old daughter Leila also enters her life. Rachel takes care of the child, cares for and soon loves her like her own. But she must recognize that the close bond with Leila harbors a possible risk, especially in relation to the girl's birth mother Alice. Rachel doesn't want to just be an "extra" in Leila's life. Time is also working against her, if she tries to fulfill her desire to have a child of her own at this age.

== Cast ==
- Virginie Efira as Rachel
- Roschdy Zem as Ali
- Chiara Mastroianni as Alice
- Callie Ferreira-Goncalves as Leila
- Yamée Couture as Louana
- Henri-Noël Tabary as Vincent
- Victor Lefebvre as Dylan
- Sebastien Pouderoux as Paul
- Michel Zlotowski as father
- Mireille Perrie as Mme Roucheray
- Frederick Wiseman as Dr. Wiseman
- Antonia Buresi as Mia
- Marlene Saldana as Soraya
- Anne Berest as Jeanne
- Marwen Okbi as Tarik

== Production ==
Other People's Children is the fifth feature film by French director and screenwriter Rebecca Zlotowski. The work is said to have been inspired by her relationship with director Jacques Audiard.

Zlotowski cast Virginie Efira, Roschdy Zem, Chiara Mastroianni and child actress Callie Ferreira-Goncalves in pivotal roles. She had previously collaborated with Zem on the television series Savages in 2019. In an interview, the actor noted Zlotowski's feminine gaze. He said that she would have created his part as Efira's lover without cliches. He recalled a scene where Efira's character was smoking and watching him take a shower. "I grew up with a movie theater, a television, an existence itself that was 95 percent male. This everyday patriarchy hurt me, but of course it's going away. I notice it with children of my son's age," says Zem.

The film was produced by Frédéric Jouve for Les Films Velvet, who in the same capacity oversaw all of Zlotowski's previous feature films. France 3 Cinéma appeared as co-producer. The broadcasting rights were secured in advance by Canal+ Cinéma and France Télévisions. The project was supported by the national film promotion authority Centre national du cinéma et de l'image animée (CNC) and the SOFICA companies Indéfilms, Cinécap and Cineventure. For camera and editing, Zlotowski engaged George Lechaptois and Géraldine Mangenot, with whom she worked on her previous feature film, An Easy Girl (2019). The film music was composed by Robin Coudert alias Rob.

Principal photography began in March 2021.

== Release ==
The film had its world premiere at the 79th Venice International Film Festival on 4 September 2022, and competes for Golden Lion in 'In competition' section. It held its North American Premiere at 2022 Toronto International Film Festival in 'Special Presentations' section on 8 September 2022 at Scotiabank Theatre, Toronto. Later it was released by Ad Vitam in France on 21 September 2022. It was featured in the 'World Cinema' section of 27th Busan International Film Festival and was screened on 9 October 2022. In November 2022, it was featured in 'Country in focus' section of 53rd International Film Festival of India. Later in December, it was invited to Spotlight section of 2023 Sundance Film Festival to be held from January 19 to 29, 2023.

== Reception ==
On the review aggregator Rotten Tomatoes website, the film has an approval rating of 91% based on 64 reviews, with an average rating of 7.6/10. The website's consensus reads, "Other People's Children perceptively explores motherhood outside traditional biological confines and delivers sobering truths with an ample side of levity." On Metacritic, it has a weighted average score of 80 out of 100 based on 19 reviews, indicating "generally favorable reviews". AlloCiné rated the film 4.1/5, based on 36 reviews, which is an 'Average grade'.

Guy Lodge of Variety wrote: "Zlotowski’s deft, perceptive original screenplay is keenly attuned to the cutting emotional impact of a passing remark or overheard jab, and the unintended microaggressions that parents occasionally toss at their child-free peers." Ben Croll of IndieWire graded the film with B+ and wrote, "Other People’s Children feels, to put it bluntly, delightfully French."

== Awards and nominations ==
| Year | Award | Category | Recipient(s) | Result | Ref. |
|---|---|---|---|---|---|
| 2022 | Venice Film Festival | Golden Lion | Other People's Children | Nominated | |
| 2023 | Lumière Awards | Best Film | Other People's Children | Nominated | |
| 2023 | Lumière Awards | Best Director | Rebecca Zlotowski | Nominated | |
| 2023 | Lumière Awards | Best Screenplay | Rebecca Zlotowski | Nominated | |
| 2023 | Lumière Awards | Best Actress | Virginie Efira | Won | |
