= Stéphane Demoustier =

French film director

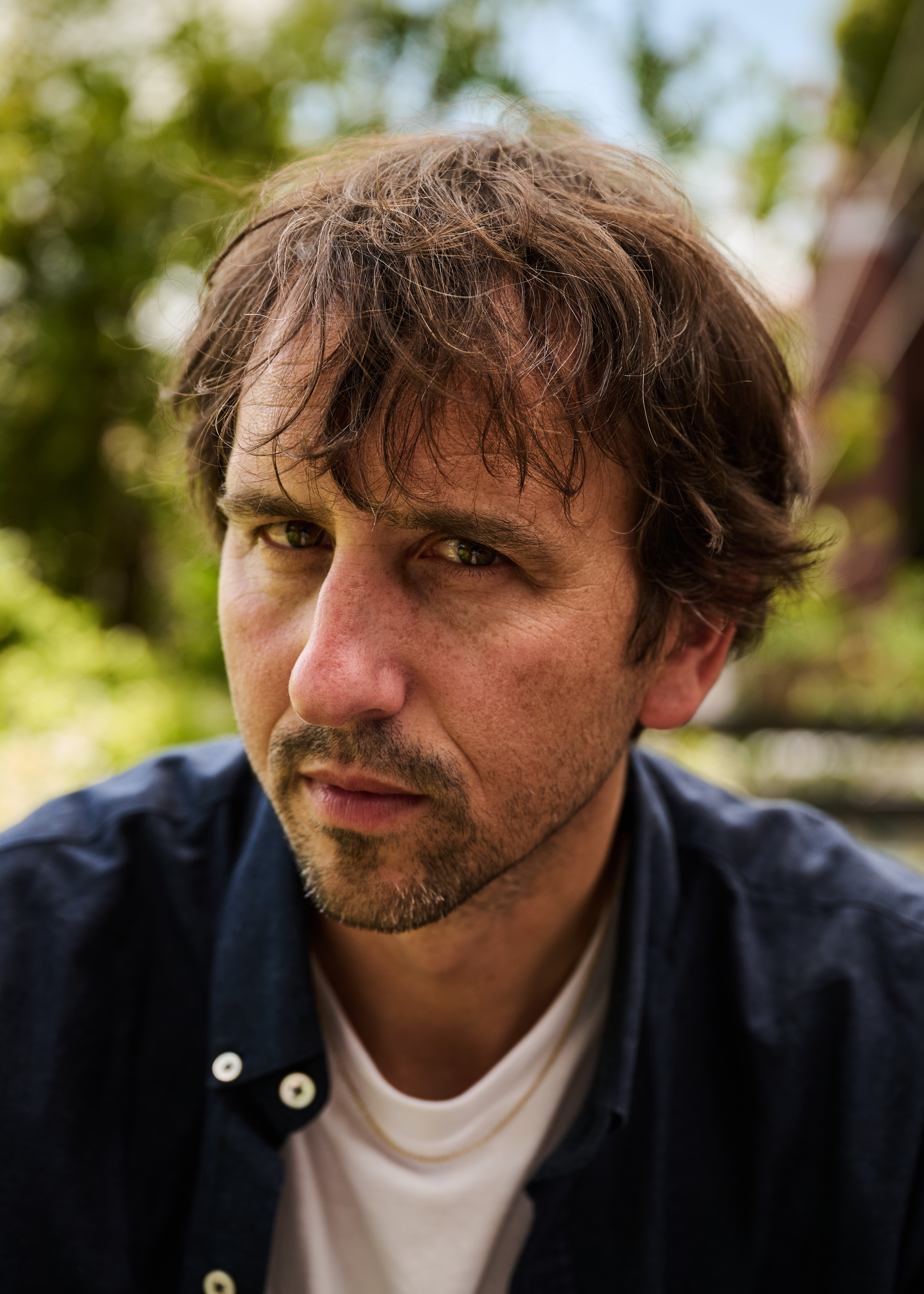
- Demoustier in 2025
- Born: 1977 (age 48–49); Lille, France
- Occupations: Film director; screenwriter; producer
- Years active: 2008–present
- Relatives: Anaïs Demoustier (sister)

Stéphane Demoustier (born 1977 in Lille) is a French film director, screenwriter and producer. He has directed five feature films: 40-Love (2014), Cléo & Paul (2018), The Girl with a Bracelet (2019), Borgo (2023), and The Great Arch (2025).

== Biography ==
A graduate of political science at HEC Paris, Demoustier began his career in the Ministry of Culture, in the architecture department, where he produced and directed documentaries, before deciding to leave his position to pursue a career in film. In 2005–2006, he studied at the Atelier Ludwigsburg-Paris, a training programme organised by La Fémis and the Film Academy Baden-Württemberg.

Co-founder of the production company Année Zéro with his sister Jeanne Demoustier, Stéphane Demoustier directed several short films, before directing his first feature film, 40-Love, released in 2014. He is also the brother of actress Anaïs Demoustier and jewelry designer Camille Demoustier. In 2018, he directed his own twin daughter and son in the film Cléo & Paul.

== Selected filmography ==
=== Feature films ===
Year	English Title	Original Title
2014	40-Love	Terre battue
2018	Cléo & Paul	Allons enfants
2019	The Girl with a Bracelet	La Fille au bracelet
2023	Borgo	
2025	The Great Arch	L'Inconnu de la Grande Arche
2026	La Chaleur	

=== Short films ===
- 2008: Première
- 2010: Dans la jungle des villes
- 2011: Bad Gones
- 2011: Des nœuds dans la tête
- 2012: Fille du calvaire
- 2014: Les Petits Joueurs

=== Television ===
- 2021–2022: L'Opéra
- 2025: Cimetière indien (episodes 1–4)

=== As producer ===
- 2011: Un monde sans femmes, directed by Guillaume Brac
- 2014: La Contre-allée, directed by Cécile Ducrocq
- 2016: Villeperdue, directed by Julien Gaspar-Oliveri
- 2021: Anaïs in Love, directed by Charline Bourgeois-Tacquet

== Accolades ==
Award	Date of ceremony	Category	Film	Result	Ref.
Cannes Film Festival	24 May 2025	Un Certain Regard	The Great Arch	Nominated	
César Awards	25 February 2016	Best Short Film (shared with Cécile Ducrocq and Guillaume Dreyfus)	La Contre-allée	Won	
César Awards	12 March 2021	Best Adaptation	The Girl with a Bracelet	Won	
César Awards	28 February 2025	Best Original Screenplay	Borgo	Nominated	
Lumière Awards	19 January 2021	Best Film	The Girl with a Bracelet	Nominated	
Lumière Awards	19 January 2021	Best Screenplay	The Girl with a Bracelet	Won	
Lumière Awards	18 January 2026	Best Film	The Great Arch	Nominated	
Lumière Awards	18 January 2026	Best Director	The Great Arch	Nominated	
Lumière Awards	18 January 2026	Best Screenplay	The Great Arch	Won	
