= 18th Lumière Awards =

2013 French film awards ceremony

- Date: 18 January 2013
- Site: Théâtre de la Gaîté, Paris, France

Highlights
- Best Film: Amour
- Best Director: Jacques Audiard
- Best Actor: Jean-Louis Trintignant
- Best Actress: Emmanuelle Riva
- Most awards: Amour (3)
- Most nominations: Camille Rewinds (7)

The 18th Lumière Awards ceremony, presented by the Académie des Lumières, was held on 18 January 2013, at the Théâtre de la Gaîté in Paris. The ceremony was chaired by Victoria Abril. Amour won three awards including Best Film.

== Winners and nominees ==
Winners are listed first and highlighted in bold.

Best Film	Best Director
**Amour**: Rust and Bone; Farewell, My Queen; Camille Rewinds; Holy Motors	**Jacques Audiard — Rust and Bone**: Noémie Lvovsky — Camille Rewinds; Michael Haneke — Amour; Leos Carax — Holy Motors; Cyril Mennegun — Louise Wimmer
Best Actor	Best Actress
**Jean-Louis Trintignant — Amour**: Denis Lavant — Holy Motors; Guillaume Canet — A Better Life; Jérémie Renier — My Way; Matthias Schoenaerts — Rust and Bone	**Emmanuelle Riva — Amour**: Catherine Frot — Haute Cuisine; Noémie Lvovsky — Camille Rewinds; Marion Cotillard — Rust and Bone; Corinne Masiero — Louise Wimmer
Most Promising Actor	Most Promising Actress
**Ernst Umhauer** — **In the House**: Stephane Soo Mongo — Hold Back; Pierre Niney — Comme des frères; Mahmud Shalaby — A Bottle in the Gaza Sea; Clément Métayer — Something in the Air	**Julia Faure, Judith Chemla & India Hair** — **Camille Rewinds**: Agathe Bonitzer — A Bottle in the Gaza Sea; Stéphanie Sokolinski — Augustine; Sofiia Manousha — Le Noir (Te) Vous Va Si Bien; Izïa Higelin — Bad Girl
Best Screenplay	Best French-Language Film
**Rust and Bone** — **Jacques Audiard** and **Thomas Bidegain**: A Bottle in the Gaza Sea — Thierry Binisti and Valérie Zenatti; Farewell, My Queen — Benoît Jacquot and Gilles Taurand; Camille Rewinds — Florence Seyvos, Maud Ameline and Pierre-Olivier Mattei; Holy Motors — Leos Carax	**The Pirogue**: Monsieur Lazhar; Laurence Anyways; Sister; Our Children
Special Jury Prize	Best Cinematography
**Camille Rewinds** — **Noémie Lvovsky**	**Antoine Heberlé** — **Inheritance** & **A Few Hours of Spring**
Honorary Lumière Award
**Claudia Cardinale**

== See also ==
- 38th César Awards
- 3rd Magritte Awards
