= Case 137 =

2025 film by Dominik Moll

- French promotional poster
- French: Dossier 137
- Directed by: Dominik Moll
- Written by: Dominik Moll; Gilles Marchand
- Produced by: Carole Scotta; Caroline Benjo; Barbara Letellier; Simon Arnal
- Starring: Léa Drucker; Jonathan Turnbull; Mathilde Roehrich; Guslagie Malanda; Stanislas Merhar; Sandra Colombo; Valentin Campagne; Mathilde Riu; Côme Péronnet; Solàn Machado-Graner; Théo Costa-Marini; Théo Navarro-Mussy; Florence Viala
- Cinematography: Patrick Ghiringhelli
- Edited by: Laurent Rouan
- Music by: Olivier Marguerit
- Production companies: Haut et Court; France 2 Cinéma
- Distributed by: Haut et Court
- Release dates: 15 May 2025 (Cannes); 19 November 2025 (France)
- Running time: 116 minutes
- Country: France
- Language: French
- Box office: $6.2 million

Case 137 (French: Dossier 137) is a 2025 French crime drama film directed by Dominik Moll, co-written by Moll and Gilles Marchand. It stars Léa Drucker, Jonathan Turnbull, Mathilde Roehrich, Guslagie Malanda and Stanislas Merhar.

The film had its world premiere in the main competition of the 2025 Cannes Film Festival on 15 May, where it was nominated for the Palme d'Or. At the 51st César Award, it received eight nominations, winning Best Actress for Drucker. It was theatrically released in France by Haut et Court on 19 November 2025.

== Premise ==
When someone is injured by a flash-ball projectile during the yellow vests protests, Stéphanie Bertrand, an investigator with the IGPN, is tasked with determining responsibility.

== Cast ==
- Léa Drucker as Stéphanie Bertrand
- Jonathan Turnbull as Benoit Guérini
- Mathilde Roehrich as Carole Delarue
- Guslagie Malanda as Alicia Mady
- Stanislas Merhar as Jérémy
- Sandra Colombo as Joëlle Girard
- Valentin Campagne as Rémi Cordier
- Mathilde Riu as Sonia Girard
- Côme Péronnet as Guillaume Girard
- Solàn Machado-Graner as Victor
- Théo Costa-Marini as Arnaud Lavallée
- Théo Navarro-Mussy as Mickaël Fages
- Florence Viala as Madame Jarry

== Production ==
Principal photography took place from October to December 2024. The film was shot in Paris, Saint-Ouen, Saint-Dizier, and Vitry-le-François.

== Release ==
Charades acquired the international sales rights to the film on 8 January 2025. The film had its world premiere in the main competition of the 78th Cannes Film Festival on 15 May 2025.

Ahead of the film's premiere, Cannes artistic director Thierry Frémaux announced that actor Théo Navarro-Mussy had been banned from walking the red carpet due to ongoing rape allegations against him; the decision was reached in agreement with the film's producers. Director Dominik Moll stated, "I understand their decision because they had an engagement not to put forward people who were accused of violence and sexual violence. It had nothing to do with the film, because it was previous to it, and we didn’t know about it. But I understand their decision."

Following its Cannes premiere, the film was also screened in the Open Air Premiere section of the 31st Sarajevo Film Festival in August 2025. Later that month, it was acquired by Film Movement for release in North America. It received a theatrical release in France on 19 November 2025.

== Reception ==
=== Critical response ===
On the review aggregator website Rotten Tomatoes, 94% of 47 critics' reviews are positive, with an average rating of 7.6/10. The website's consensus reads: "A taut, emotionally grounded procedural, Dossier 137 transcends its genre with a deeply personal lens to confront police corruption and political unrest with gripping precision." Metacritic, which uses a weighted average, assigned the film a score of 73 out of 100, based on 10 critics, indicating "generally favorable" reviews.

Peter Bradshaw of The Guardian gave the film a rating of three out of five stars, calling it "serious, focused, if slightly programmatic". Sophie Monks Kaufman of IndieWire gave the film a grade of B, calling it "solid", but "ambling". Tim Grierson of Screen Daily wrote, "Case 137's no-frills style can leave the film feeling a tad generic, and one wishes that [director Dominik] Moll resisted underlining some of his thematic points so strenuously." Léa Drucker's performance as Stéphanie Bertrand earned praise from critics, with both Stephanie Bunbury of Deadline and Guy Lodge of Variety calling it "superb"; Lodge also commended the performance of Solàn Machado-Graner.

=== Accolades ===
Award	Date of ceremony	Category	Recipient(s)	Result	Ref.
Cannes Film Festival	24 May 2025	Palme d'Or	Dominik Moll	Nominated	
European Film Awards	17 January 2026	European Actress	Léa Drucker	Nominated	
Lumière Awards	18 January 2026	Best Film	Case 137	Nominated	
Lumière Awards	18 January 2026	Best Director	Dominik Moll	Nominated	
Lumière Awards	18 January 2026	Best Actress	Léa Drucker	Won	
Lumière Awards	18 January 2026	Best Screenplay	Dominik Moll and Gilles Marchand	Nominated	
