= Kings and Queen =

- French poster
- French: Rois et reine
- Directed by: Arnaud Desplechin
- Written by: Roger Bohbot; Arnaud Desplechin
- Produced by: Pascal Caucheteux
- Starring: Emmanuelle Devos; Mathieu Amalric; Catherine Deneuve; Noémie Lvovsky
- Cinematography: Eric Gautier
- Edited by: Laurence Briaud
- Music by: Grégoire Hetzel
- Production companies: Why Not Productions; France 2 Cinéma; Rhône-Alpes Cinéma
- Distributed by: BAC Films
- Release dates: 3 September 2004 (Venice); 22 December 2004 (France)
- Running time: 150 minutes
- Country: France
- Language: French
- Budget: $3.8 million
- Box office: $4,575,710

Kings and Queen (French: Rois et reine) is a 2004 French drama film directed by Arnaud Desplechin, starring Emmanuelle Devos and Mathieu Amalric. The film had its world premiere in the Competition section at the 61st Venice International Film Festival on 3 September 2004. It was released in France on 22 December 2004.

== Plot ==
Nora Cotterelle, a woman in her thirties is caring for her ill father, Louis Jenssens.

While Nora tries to present a facade that all is well with her life, she is twice divorced and has a son, Elias, whose father is dead. Elias has behavior problems caused by autism.

Nora's present relationship is not going well, and she is soon to marry a businessman, while Elias is becoming increasingly withdrawn.

A parallel story-line follows her former lover and second husband, Ismaël Vuillard, a musician with whom she had lived for seven years. He is given to strange behaviour, and as a result he has been committed to a mental hospital from which he is planning to escape.

Nora learns that her father's digestive problems are actually cancer, and facing her father's death, Nora desperately seeks out Ismaël to ask that he reconnect with Elias, but he has mixed feelings about adopting her son. Moreover, he has met Arielle, another patient.

== Cast ==
- Emmanuelle Devos as Nora Cotterelle
- Mathieu Amalric as Ismaël Vuillard
- Catherine Deneuve as Mme Vasset, psychiatrist
- Maurice Garrel as Louis Jenssens
- Nathalie Boutefeu as Chloé Jenssens
- Jean-Paul Roussillon as Abel Vuillard
- Magali Woch as Arielle, la "chinoise"
- Hippolyte Girardot as Maître Marc Mamanne
- Noémie Lvovsky as Elizabeth, Ismaël's sister
- Valentin Lelong as Elias Cotterelle
- Joachim Salinger as Pierre Cotterelle

== Release ==
The film had its world premiere in the Competition section at the 61st Venice International Film Festival on 3 September 2004. It was released in France on 22 December 2004.

== Reception ==
=== Critical response ===
On review aggregator website Rotten Tomatoes, the film holds an approval rating of 86% based on 57 reviews, and an average rating of 7.5/10. The website's consensus reads: "A dryly comic, stylistically brave film." On Metacritic, the film has a weighted average score of 84 out of 100, based on 26 critics, indicating "universal acclaim".

Peter Bradshaw of The Guardian gave the film 4 out of 5 stars, calling it "rich, complex and deeply pleasing". Erica Abeel of Film Journal International wrote: "Its novelistic breadth, pitched intensity and on-the-fly shooting style pull the viewer smack-dab into the middle of these lives."

=== Accolades ===
Award	Year of ceremony	Category	Recipient(s)	Result	Ref(s)
Louis Delluc Prize	2004	Best Film	Kings and Queen	Won	
Lumière Awards	2005	Best Actor	Mathieu Amalric	Won	
Lumière Awards	2005	Best Actress	Emmanuelle Devos	Won	
César Award	2005	Best Film	Kings and Queen	Nominated	
César Award	2005	Best Director	Arnaud Desplechin	Nominated	
César Award	2005	Best Actor	Mathieu Amalric	Won	
César Award	2005	Best Actress	Emmanuelle Devos	Nominated	
César Award	2005	Best Supporting Actor	Maurice Garrel	Nominated	
César Award	2005	Most Promising Actress	Magali Woch	Nominated	
César Award	2005	Best Original Screenplay or Adaptation	Roger Bohbot and Arnaud Desplechin	Nominated	
