= The Great Arch =

- Theatrical release poster
- French: L'Inconnu de la Grande Arche
- Directed by: Stéphane Demoustier
- Written by: Stéphane Demoustier
- Based on: La Grande Arche by Laurence Cossé
- Produced by: Muriel Meynard
- Starring: Claes Bang; Sidse Babett Knudsen; Xavier Dolan; Swann Arlaud; Michel Fau
- Cinematography: David Chambille
- Edited by: Damien Maestraggi
- Music by: Olivier Marguerit
- Production companies: Ex Nihilo; Zentropa Entertainment; France 3 Cinéma; Le Pacte; MPC
- Distributed by: Le Pacte
- Release dates: 16 May 2025 (Cannes); 5 November 2025 (France)
- Running time: 108 minutes
- Country: France
- Languages: French; English; Danish; Italian
- Budget: €6 million
- Box office: $2.2 million

The Great Arch (French: L'Inconnu de la Grande Arche) is a 2025 French biographical drama film written and directed by Stéphane Demoustier, based on Laurence Cossé's 2016 novel La Grande Arche. It stars Claes Bang as Johan Otto von Spreckelsen, the Danish architect who won the 1983 competition for the design of the Grande Arche in Paris despite being virtually unknown. The cast also includes Sidse Babett Knudsen, Xavier Dolan, Swann Arlaud and Michel Fau.

The film had its world premiere in the Un Certain Regard section of the 2025 Cannes Film Festival on 16 May. It was theatrically released in France by Le Pacte on 5 November.

== Plot ==
In 1982, French President François Mitterrand launches an anonymous international competition to design a monumental building on the historic axis linking the Louvre and the Arc de Triomphe. To general surprise, the winning entry comes not from one of the world's major architectural firms but from Johan Otto von Spreckelsen, a 53-year-old architecture teacher from Copenhagen who is unknown in France and has previously built only a handful of structures, including his own house and three small chapels.

Overnight, von Spreckelsen is put in charge of the largest building project of the era, the Grande Arche de la Défense, which he affectionately calls his "cube". Determined to see the structure built exactly as he first envisioned it, he clashes repeatedly with the realities of French bureaucracy, represented chiefly by project administrator Jean-Louis Subileau, and with the pragmatic French architect Paul Andreu, who is brought in to oversee the building's technical execution. His uncompromising attachment to his original design, including a marble cladding that proves both structurally troublesome and hugely expensive, increasingly isolates him from the project's engineers and financiers. When the 1986 legislative elections bring a new, right-wing government to power in cohabitation with Mitterrand, the political backing that had protected von Spreckelsen evaporates. The film ends on a bleak note: worn down by the years-long conflict, von Spreckelsen dies before the Grande Arche is completed, which is inaugurated two years later.

== Cast ==
- Claes Bang as Johan Otto von Spreckelsen
- Sidse Babett Knudsen as von Spreckelsen's wife Liv
- Xavier Dolan as Jean-Louis Subileau
- Swann Arlaud as Paul Andreu
- Michel Fau as François Mitterrand
- Micha Lescot as Leloup
- Jean des Forêts as Alain Juppé

== Production ==
Bang was cast in the lead role despite not speaking French, as von Spreckelsen himself was not a French speaker, and carefully rehearsed the script to ensure that he would be able to perform it.

== Release ==
The film had its world premiere in the Un Certain Regard section of the 2025 Cannes Film Festival on 16 May. It was theatrically released in France by Le Pacte on 5 November.

== Response ==
=== Box office ===
It grossed $2.2 million at the box office.

=== Critical response ===
Jordan Mintzer of The Hollywood Reporter wrote that "Demoustier's depiction of the long — it took seven years from start to finish — and sordid affair behind The Great Arch's construction is a tale of lost illusions, with von Spreckelsen as a misguided genius who won the architectural lottery and wound up paying a hefty price for it. There are some clever bits of humor throughout the movie, especially involving all the shenanigans of the French, but the Dane's story ends on a decidedly dark note."

For Cineuropa, Fabien Lemercier wrote that "Skilfully navigating the paradoxical dimension of his subject, tracing the path of an individual with a very human radicalism (particularly attached to hand-drawing) in the midst of a number of fairly specific professional twists and turns (regularity of joints, fixing points, foundations, support, glued glass, nitrate staining of Carrara marble, experiments, search for solutions, etc.), Stéphane Demoustier succeeds in expressing the most sensitive nuances for an uninformed audience using a patina of comedy that does not spare the French presidential royalty and its procession of senior civil servants. It's a "marriage of the dull and the shiny" that gives the film its seductive balance, its zest and its charm."

=== Accolades ===
Award	Date of ceremony	Category	Recipient(s)	Result	Ref.
Cannes Film Festival	16 May 2025	Un Certain Regard	Stéphane Demoustier	Nominated	
Lumière Awards	18 January 2026	Best Film	The Great Arch	Nominated	
Lumière Awards	18 January 2026	Best Director	Stéphane Demoustier	Nominated	
Lumière Awards	18 January 2026	Best Actor	Claes Bang	Nominated	
Lumière Awards	18 January 2026	Best Screenplay	Stéphane Demoustier	Won	
