= 11th Lumière Awards =

2006 French film awards ceremony

- Date: 21 February 2006
- Site: Cinéma des cinéastes, Paris, France

Highlights
- Best Film: The Beat That My Heart Skipped
- Best Director: Philippe Garrel
- Best Actor: Romain Duris
- Best Actress: Isabelle Huppert
- Most awards: The Beat That My Heart Skipped (2)

The 11th Lumière Awards ceremony, presented by the Académie des Lumières, was held on 21 February 2006. Claudia Cardinale presided the ceremony for the second time. The Beat That My Heart Skipped won the award for Best Film.

== Winners ==
Award	Winner
Best Film	The Beat That My Heart Skipped
Best Director	Philippe Garrel — Regular Lovers
Best Actor	Romain Duris — The Beat That My Heart Skipped
Best Actress	Isabelle Huppert — Gabrielle
Best Screenplay	Caché — Michael Haneke
Most Promising Actor	Johan Libéreau — Cold Showers
Most Promising Actress	Fanny Valette — Little Jerusalem
Best French-Language Film	L'Enfant
World Audience Award (presented by TV5Monde)	Live and Become

== See also ==
- 31st César Awards
