= Three Hearts (film) =

2014 film

- Theatrical release poster
- Directed by: Benoît Jacquot
- Written by: Julien Boivent; Benoît Jacquot
- Produced by: Alice Girard; Edouard Weil
- Starring: Benoît Poelvoorde; Charlotte Gainsbourg; Chiara Mastroianni; Catherine Deneuve; André Marcon; Patrick Mille
- Cinematography: Julien Hirsch
- Edited by: Julia Grégory
- Music by: Bruno Coulais
- Production companies: Rectangle Productions; Pandora Film; Scope Pictures; Arte France Cinéma
- Distributed by: Wild Bunch
- Release dates: 30 August 2014 (Venice); 17 September 2014 (France)
- Running time: 106 minutes
- Country: France
- Language: French
- Budget: €7.1 million
- Box office: US$3.1 million

Three Hearts (French: 3 cœurs) is a 2014 French drama film directed by Benoît Jacquot and co-written with Julien Boivent. The film stars Benoît Poelvoorde, Charlotte Gainsbourg, Chiara Mastroianni and Catherine Deneuve. It was selected to compete for the Golden Lion at the 71st Venice International Film Festival. It was screened in the Special Presentations section of the 2014 Toronto International Film Festival. In January 2015, the film received four nominations at the 20th Lumière Awards.

== Synopsis ==
After missing a train, Marc meets and falls in love with Sylvie. They agree to meet in Paris at the Jardin des Tuileries without exchanging contact information. On the time of the rendezvous, Marc is held up in a meeting and they miss each other. Disappointed, Sylvie moves to the USA with her husband. Later, Marc meets Sylvie's sister Sophie and they fall in love. As Marc and Sophie's relationship becomes serious, he discovers she is Sylvie's sister.

== Cast ==
- Benoît Poelvoorde as Marc Beaulieu
- Charlotte Gainsbourg as Sylvie Berger
- Chiara Mastroianni as Sophie Berger
- Catherine Deneuve as Madame Berger
- André Marcon as Castang
- Patrick Mille as Sylvie's husband
- Thomas Doret as Gabriel
- Anne Consigny as The cardiologist

== Production ==
Three Hearts is produced by Edouard Weil and Alice Girard for Rectangle Productions, with co-production support from Pandora Film, Scope Pictures and Arte France Cinéma. The film was pre-acquired by Canal+ and Ciné+ and will be distributed by Wild Bunch in France.

Filming began on 16 September 2013 in the Île-de-France region and was completed in 45 days. Filming also took place in the Drôme department in Valence, Crest and Beaumont-Monteux as well as in Les Vans in the Ardèche department.

== Critical response ==
On review aggregator website Rotten Tomatoes, Three Hearts has an approval rating of 81%, based on 36 reviews, with an average rating of 6.8/10. On Metacritic, which assigns a normalized rating, the film has a score of 56 out of 100, based on 19 critics, indicating "mixed or average reviews".

== Accolades ==
Award / Film Festival	Category	Recipients and nominees	Result
Louis Delluc Prize	Best Film		Nominated
Lumière Awards	Best Film		Nominated
Lumière Awards	Best Director	Benoît Jacquot	Nominated
Lumière Awards	Best Actor	Benoît Poelvoorde	Nominated
Lumière Awards	Best Actress	Charlotte Gainsbourg	Nominated
Venice International Film Festival	Golden Lion		Nominated
World Soundtrack Awards	Soundtrack Composer of the Year	Bruno Coulais	Nominated
