= Léa Fehner =

French film director and screenwriter

- Born: 15 October 1981 (age 44); Toulouse, France
- Occupation(s): Film director, screenwriter
- Years active: 2000–present

Léa Fehner (born 15 October 1981) is a French film director and screenwriter.

== Life and career ==
Born in Toulouse and raised in a travelling theatre family, Fehner attended classes in Nantes and at the INSAS school, before pursuing an education in screenwriting at La Fémis, from which she graduated in 2006. During her studies, she had internships at the film centre in Bamako and in Cambodia. Between 2000 and 2007, she wrote and directed several shorts, among which Sauf le Silence was showcased at various film festivals including the Clermont-Ferrand International Short Film Festival and the Toronto Worldwide Short Film Festival. In 2009, she made her directorial feature film debut Silent Voice, starring Farida Rahouadj, Reda Kateb and Pauline Étienne. It won the Louis Delluc Prize for Best First Film in 2009 and was nominated for Best First Feature Film at the 35th César Awards.

== Filmography ==
Year	Title	Credited as		Notes
Year	Title	Director	Screenwriter	Notes
2000	Miros	Yes	Yes	Short film
2001	Caillou	Yes	Yes	Short film
2001	Dora	Yes	Yes	Documentary short film
2003	Ceux qui tiennent les murs	Yes	Yes	Short film
2004	Conflit de canards		Yes	Short film
2005	Ici, maintenant et encore		Yes	Short film
2006	Les Pieds devant		Yes	Short film
2007	Sauf le silence	Yes	Yes	Short film
2009	Silent Voice	Yes	Yes	Deauville American Film Festival - Prix Michel d'Ornano; Louis Delluc Prize for Best First Film; Nominated—César Award for Best First Feature Film
2015	Les Ogres	Yes	Yes	Cabourg Film Festival - Best Film; International Film Festival Rotterdam - VPRO Big Screen Award; Odesa International Film Festival - Special Mention; Nominated—Lumière Award for Best Film; Nominated—Lumière Award for Best Director; Nominated—Lumière Award for Best Screenplay
