= 2nd Lumière Awards =

1997 French film awards ceremony

- Date: 13 January 1997
- Site: Paris, France

Highlights
- Best Film: Ridicule
- Best Director: Cédric Klapisch
- Best Actor: Charles Berling
- Best Actress: Fanny Ardant
- Most awards: Ridicule (3)

Television coverage
- Network: Paris Première

The 2nd Lumière Awards ceremony, presented by the Académie des Lumières, was held on 13 January 1997. It was presented at the time as the Lumières de Paris. The ceremony was chaired by Philippe Noiret. Ridicule won three awards including Best Film, Best Actor and Best Actress.

== Winners ==
Award	Winner
Best Film	Ridicule
Best Director	Cédric Klapisch — Family Resemblances
Best Actor	Charles Berling — Ridicule
Best Actress	Fanny Ardant — Ridicule
Best Screenplay	Family Resemblances — Cédric Klapisch, Jean-Pierre Bacri and Agnès Jaoui
Best Foreign Film	Il Postino: The Postman

== See also ==
- 22nd César Awards
