= 17th Lumière Awards =

2012 French film awards ceremony

- Date: 13 January 2012
- Site: Hôtel de Ville, Paris, France

Highlights
- Best Film: The Artist
- Best Director: Maïwenn
- Best Actor: Omar Sy
- Best Actress: Bérénice Bejo

The 17th Lumière Awards ceremony, presented by the Académie des Lumières, was held on 13 January 2012. The ceremony was presided by Catherine Jacob. The Artist won the award for Best Film.

== Winners and nominees ==
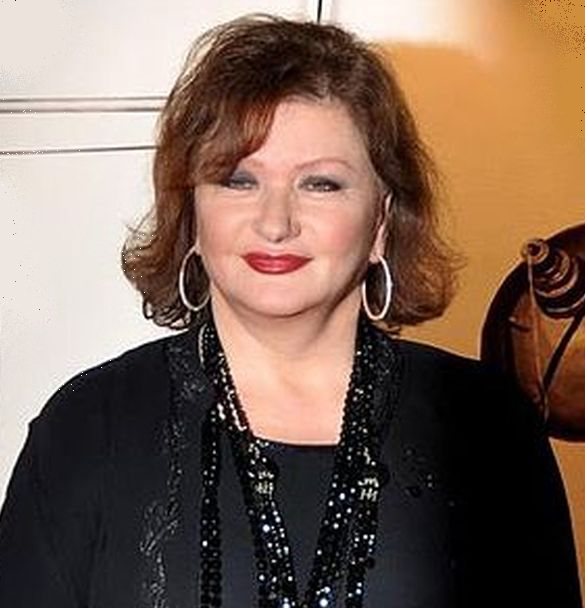
Catherine Jacob, President of the ceremony.

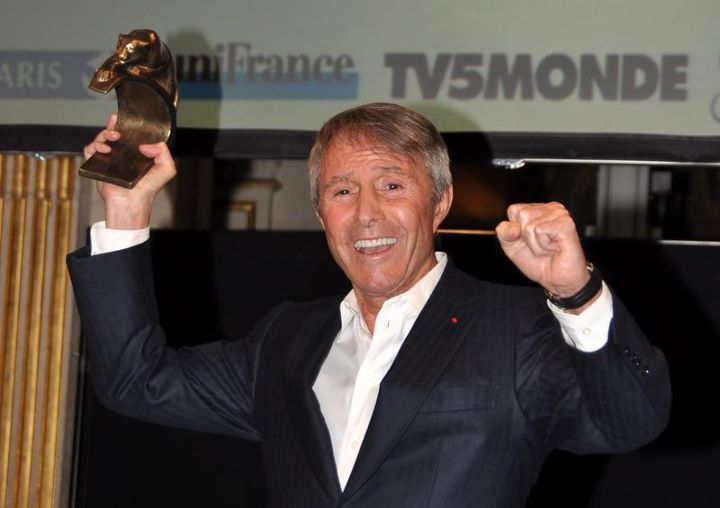
Francis Veber, recipient of the Honorary Lumière Award.

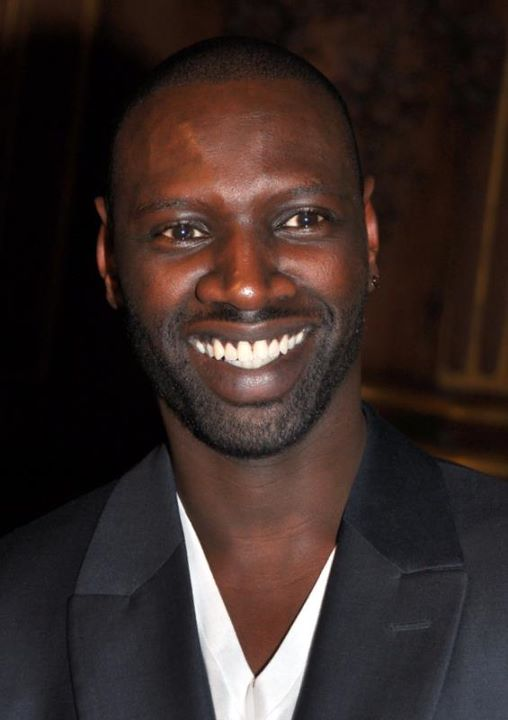
Omar Sy, Lumière Award for Best Actor.

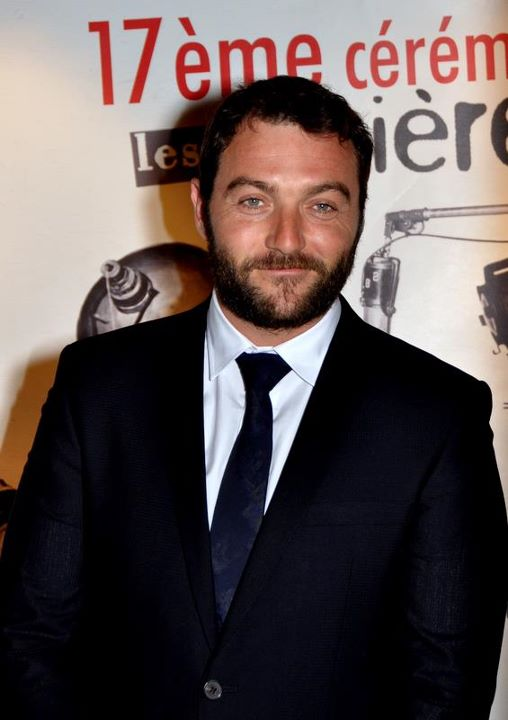
Denis Ménochet, Lumière Award for Most Promising Actor.

Winners are listed first and highlighted in bold.

Best Film	Best Director
**The Artist**: Le Havre; The Minister; The Intouchables; House of Tolerance	**Maïwenn — Polisse**: Aki Kaurismäki — Le Havre; Michel Hazanavicius — The Artist; Bertrand Bonello — House of Tolerance; Pierre Schoeller — The Minister
Best Actor	Best Actress
**Omar Sy — The Intouchables**: André Wilms — Le Havre; Olivier Gourmet — The Minister; JoeyStarr — Polisse; Jean Dujardin — The Artist	**Bérénice Bejo — The Artist**: Catherine Deneuve — Beloved; Karin Viard — Polisse; Chiara Mastroianni — Beloved; Marina Foïs — Polisse; Valérie Donzelli — Declaration of War; Clotilde Hesme — Angel & Tony
Most Promising Actor	Most Promising Actress
**Denis Ménochet** — **The Adopted**: Guillaume Gouix — Jimmy Rivière; Grégory Gadebois — Angel & Tony; Raphaël Ferret — Guilty; Mahmud Shalaby — Free Men	**Adèle Haenel, Céline Sallette & Alice Barnole** — **House of Tolerance**: Anamaria Vartolomei — My Little Princess; Zoé Héran — Tomboy
Best Screenplay	Best French-Language Film
**The Snows of Kilimanjaro** — **Jean-Louis Milesi** and **Robert Guédiguian**: The Minister — Pierre Schoeller; Polisse — Emmanuelle Bercot and Maïwenn; House of Tolerance — Bertrand Bonello; The Artist — Michel Hazanavicius	**Incendies**: The Kid with a Bike; The Giants; Curling; Where Do We Go Now?
Best Cinematography	Honorary Lumière Award
**Pierre Aïm** — **Polisse**	**Francis Veber**

== See also ==
- 37th César Awards
- 2nd Magritte Awards
