= Summertime (2015 film) =

2015 film by Catherine Corsini

- Theatrical release poster
- French: La Belle Saison
- Directed by: Catherine Corsini
- Written by: Catherine Corsini; Laurette Polmanss
- Produced by: Elisabeth Perez
- Starring: Cécile de France; Izïa Higelin; Noémie Lvovsky
- Cinematography: Jeanne Lapoirie
- Edited by: Frédéric Baillehaiche
- Music by: Grégoire Hetzel
- Production companies: Chaz Productions; France 3 Cinéma; Artémis Productions; Solaire Production
- Distributed by: Pyramide Distribution
- Release dates: 6 August 2015 (Locarno); 19 August 2015
- Running time: 105 minutes
- Countries: France; Belgium
- Language: French
- Budget: $5.2 million
- Box office: $3.8 million

Summertime (French: La Belle Saison, lit. 'The Beautiful Season') is a 2015 romantic drama film directed by Catherine Corsini, who co-wrote the screenplay with Laurette Polmanss. The film stars Cécile de France, Izïa Higelin and Noémie Lvovsky. It premiered at the Locarno International Film Festival, where it won the Variety Piazza Grande Award.

== Plot ==
Set in 1971, Delphine is the only child of French farmers and enjoys working the land. Though her father wants her to marry, Delphine is secretly pursuing a relationship with a local girl. When she goes for a rendezvous with her, her girlfriend tells her that she plans to marry, dismissing the relationship between her and Delphine as "not serious": Delphine responds by running away to Paris.

Walking down a street, Delphine encounters a group of women running by and pinching men's buttocks. When one of the men attacks one of the women, Delphine helps protect her and learns that her name is Carole. The women belong to a feminist group, which they encourage Delphne to join and participate in their protests. When one of the group members learns that her best friend, a gay man, has been committed to a mental institution by his family and is being given electroshock therapy, the rest of the group refuses at first to help rescue him. Delphine convinces them otherwise, and she, Carole and some of the other women free him. The following night, Delphine kisses Carole, who is surprised and rejects her. The next day Carole waits for Delphine in the road and tells her she is not a lesbian, but the two immediately proceed to an alley and French kiss before moving to her apartment to have sex. Carole initially believes that it is a one-night stand, but quickly develops feelings for Delphine. She tells her boyfriend and the two struggle to work out their relationship when Carole and Delphine continuously have sex.

Delphine receives a call from her mother that her father has had a stroke. Delphine visits and realizes that she must stay to help run the farm. Taking some of the lessons she learned in the feminist collective, she represents her parents' interest to other farmers. Carole visits and decides that she cannot live without her. Leaving her boyfriend, she returns to the countryside but is surprised to learn that she and Delphine must remain discreet and closeted, as Delphine's mother does not know she is a lesbian.

Carole initially enjoys the beautiful country life and works the land with Delphine and her mother. However, she finds the people confining, as they mock her politics and it is frustrating that she is unable to openly be with Delphine. She also begins to have doubts about Delphine's intentions after Antoine, a local boy in love with Delphine since childhood, tells her that Delphine will never leave the farm and Delphine's mother tells Carole that Antoine intends to marry Delphine. Carole begins fighting with Delphine on a regular basis, which results in several people learning Delphine's secret, including a local farmer who sees them kissing in the woods, and her mother who overhears them arguing. One evening during a community gathering, the farmer who saw Carole and Delphine in the woods stalks Delphine and to cover up she kisses Antoine, but he shows dismay saying he knows why Carole is here. Distraught, she goes to Carole and cry and her consoling Delphine leads to the two having sex again.

The following morning, Delphine's mother walks in on Carole and Delphine and finds both of them naked together in bed. Though she acts like everything is normal to Delphine, she tells Carole to leave her home, accusing her of having perverted her daughter before physically attacking her. Carole tells Delphine she is leaving and Delphine decides to run away to be with Carole. Though they leave on the train together, Delphine finds herself unable to leave. She misses their connecting train to Paris and returns home.

Five years later, Carole is working at a women's health clinic and in a lesbian relationship. She receives a letter from Delphine who says that she has finally left her parents' farm and has her own in Southern France. She tells Carole that she regrets not leaving with her five years earlier, but understands that it is impossible to turn back time.

== Cast ==
- Cécile de France as Carole
- Izïa Higelin as Delphine
- Noémie Lvovsky as Monique, Delphine’s mother
- Kévin Azaïs as Antoine
- Lætitia Dosch as Adeline
- Sarah Suco as Fabienne
- Benjamin Bellecour as Manuel
- Natalie Beder as Marie-Laure
- Calypso Valois as Charlotte
- Jean-Henri Compère as Maurice, Delphine’s father
- Bruno Podalydès as Professor Chambard
- Alix Bénézech as student of Fine Arts

== Production ==
Principal photography took place in Limousin (Haute-Vienne and Creuse) and in Paris from 22 July to 16 September 2014.

Izïa Higelin revealed that the shooting was not a pleasure, far from it: "The nude and love scenes, it is perhaps the last time for me. I really had a hard time with them, I didn't think I would dislike them that much. There weren't as many in the original script, but Catherine thought that Cecile and I were a little too friendly. So she added quite a bit. And honestly, it made me very uncomfortable. It was the first time I dared and I really didn't like doing it."

== Reception ==
=== Critical response ===
On review aggregator website Rotten Tomatoes, the film holds an approval rating of 92% based on 59 reviews, and an average rating of 6.7/10. The site consensus reads, "Summertime (La Belle Saison) presents a well-acted, beautifully framed period romance that offers a refreshing perspective on its era in the bargain". On Metacritic, the film has a weighted average score of 72 out of 100, based on 16 critics, indicating "generally favorable reviews".

Muriel Del Don of Cineuropa writes "upbeat and majestic with tragic undertones", the film is a "real emotional odyssey in which passion seems to conquer all, even the most tenacious of prejudices". In a review for Variety, Peter Debruge called it a "luminous, golden-hued period piece" and a "beautifully realized tearjerker".

Reviewing it for The Hollywood Reporter, Boyd van Hoeij said that "Though the narrative somewhat awkwardly morphs from a period drama about the French women's liberation movement in early 1970s to a more rural melodrama about being closeted and choosing between duty and family and personal happiness, the story is anchored by strong performances from Cécile de France and Izïa Higelin, who have a natural chemistry that’s not only credible but actually infectious."

=== Accolades ===
Award / Film Festival	Category	Recipients and nominees	Result
Apolo Awards	Best Supporting Actress	Noémie Lvovsky	Nominated
Apolo Awards	Best Couple	Izïa Higelin and Cécile de France	Nominated
César Awards	Best Actress	Cécile de France	Nominated
César Awards	Best Supporting Actress	Noémie Lvovsky	Nominated
Locarno International Film Festival	Variety Piazza Grande Award		Won
Lumière Awards	Best Film		Nominated
Lumière Awards	Best Director	Catherine Corsini	Nominated
Lumière Awards	Best Actress	Izïa Higelin	Nominated
Lumière Awards	Best Screenplay	Catherine Corsini and Laurette Polmanss	Nominated
Lumière Awards	Best Music	Grégoire Hetzel	Won
Trophées du Film français	Duo cinéma	Catherine Corsini and Élisabeth Perez	Won

== See also ==
- List of lesbian filmmakers
- List of LGBT-related films directed by women
