= 5th Lumière Awards =

2000 French film awards ceremony

- Date: 29 January 2000
- Site: Paris, France

Highlights
- Best Film: The Messenger: The Story of Joan of Arc
- Best Director: Luc Besson
- Best Actor: Philippe Torreton
- Best Actress: Karin Viard
- Most awards: The Messenger: The Story of Joan of Arc (2)

Television coverage
- Network: France 2

The 5th Lumière Awards ceremony, presented by the Académie des Lumières, was held on 29 January 2000. The ceremony was chaired by Claudia Cardinale. The "Most Promising Actor" and "Most Promising Actress" awards were introduced in that year. The Messenger: The Story of Joan of Arc won two awards including Best Film and Best Director.

== Winners ==
Award	Winner
Best Film	The Messenger: The Story of Joan of Arc
Best Director	Luc Besson — The Messenger: The Story of Joan of Arc
Best Actor	Philippe Torreton — It All Starts Today
Best Actress	Karin Viard — Haut les cœurs!
Best Screenplay	Season's Beatings — Danièle Thompson and Christopher Thompson
Most Promising Actor	Romain Duris — Peut-être
Most Promising Actress	Audrey Tautou — Venus Beauty Institute
Best Foreign Film	All About My Mother

== See also ==
- 25th César Awards
