= 6th Lumière Awards =

2001 French film awards ceremony

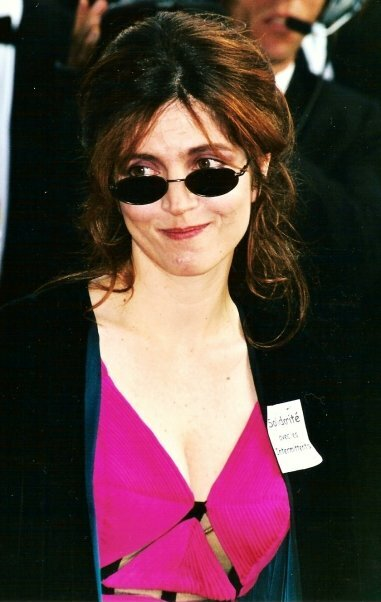
- Agnès Jaoui received the Best Director award
- Date: 24 January 2001
- Site: Paris, France
- Hosted by: Frédéric Lopez

Highlights
- Best Film: The Taste of Others
- Best Director: Agnès Jaoui
- Best Actor: Daniel Auteuil
- Best Actress: Isabelle Huppert
- Most awards: The Taste of Others (3)

Television coverage
- Network: France 2

The 6th Lumière Awards ceremony, presented by the Académie des Lumières, was held on 24 January 2001. The ceremony was hosted by Frédéric Lopez. The Taste of Others won three awards including Best Film, Best Director and Best Screenplay.

== Winners ==
Award	Winner
Best Film	The Taste of Others
Best Director	Agnès Jaoui — The Taste of Others
Best Actor	Daniel Auteuil — Sade
Best Actress	Isabelle Huppert — Merci pour le chocolat
Best Screenplay	The Taste of Others — Jean-Pierre Bacri and Agnès Jaoui
Most Promising Actor	Jalil Lespert — Human Resources
Most Promising Actress	Isild Le Besco — Sade
Best Foreign Film	American Beauty

== See also ==
- 26th César Awards
