= Les Ogres =

- Theatrical release poster
- Directed by: Léa Fehner
- Written by: Léa Fehner; Catherine Paillé; Brigitte Sy
- Produced by: Philippe Liégeois
- Starring: Adèle Haenel; Marc Barbé; Lola Dueñas
- Cinematography: Julien Poupard
- Edited by: Julien Chigot
- Music by: Philippe Cataix
- Production companies: Bus Films; France 3 Cinéma
- Distributed by: Pyramide Distribution
- Release dates: 6 October 2015 (Saint-Jean-de-Luz); 16 March 2016 (France)
- Running time: 144 minutes
- Country: France
- Language: French
- Budget: $3.5 million
- Box office: $35,600

Les Ogres is a 2015 French comedy-drama film directed by Léa Fehner and written by Fehner, Catherine Paillé and Brigitte Sy.

== Plot ==
The film centres around the life of a travelling theatre company. The members, free and eccentric, develop a bond through their passion for theatre. But the imminent arrival of a baby and the return of a former lover will reopen the old wounds of the past.

== Cast ==
- Adèle Haenel as Mona
- Marc Barbé as Monsieur Déloyal
- Lola Dueñas as Lola
- François Fehner as François
- Inès Fehner as Inès
- Marion Bouvarel as Marion
- Patrick d'Assumçao as Marion's lover
- Philippe Cataix as Chignol

== Accolades ==
Award / Film Festival	Category	Recipients and nominees	Result
Cabourg Film Festival	Swann d'Or for Best Film		Won
International Film Festival Rotterdam	VPRO Big Screen Award		Won
Lumière Awards	Best Film		Nominated
Lumière Awards	Best Director	Léa Fehner	Nominated
Lumière Awards	Best Screenplay	Léa Fehner, Catherine Paillé and Brigitte Sy	Nominated
Odesa International Film Festival	Special Mention		Won
