= Lumière Award for Best Foreign Film =

Former annual film award

Lumière Award for Best Foreign film
- Country: France
- Presented by: Académie des Lumières
- First award: 1996–2002
- Website: academiedeslumieres.com

The Lumière Award for Best Foreign Film (French: Lumière du meilleur film étranger) was presented annually by the Académie des Lumières from 1996 and 2002.

== History ==
It was given to a non-French film released in France in the previous year. It was replaced by the Lumière Award for Best French-Language Film, which was awarded from 2003 to 2019 to a French-language film made outside France, then by the Lumière Award for Best International Co-Production, which has been awarded since 2020 to an international co-production financed by a French company and released in France in the previous year.

== Winners ==
=== 1990s ===
Year	English title	Original title	Director(s)	Country
1996 (1st)	Underground		Emir Kusturica	Yugoslavia (Serbia), Bulgaria, Czech Republic, France, Germany, Hungary
1997 (2nd)	The Postman	Il postino	Michael Radford	Italy, France, Belgium
1998 (3rd)	Brassed Off		Mark Herman	United Kingdom
1999 (4th)	Life Is Beautiful	La vita è bella	Roberto Benigni	Italy

=== 2000s ===
Year	English title	Original title	Director(s)	Country
2000 (5th)	All About My Mother	Todo sobre mi madre	Pedro Almodóvar	Spain, France
2001 (6th)	American Beauty		Sam Mendes	United States
2002 (7th)	Billy Elliot		Stephen Daldry	United Kingdom

== See also ==
- César Award for Best Foreign Film
