= 3rd Lumière Awards =

1997 French film awards ceremony

- Date: 15 December 1997
- Site: Paris, France

Highlights
- Best Film: Marius and Jeannette
- Best Director: Luc Besson
- Best Actor: Michel Serrault
- Best Actress: Miou-Miou

Television coverage
- Network: Paris Première

The 3rd Lumière Awards ceremony, presented by the Académie des Lumières, was held on 15 December 1997. It was presented at the time as the Lumières de Paris. The ceremony was chaired by Fanny Ardant. Robert Guédiguian's Marius and Jeannette won the Best Film award.

== Winners ==
Award	Winner
Best Film	Marius and Jeannette
Best Director	Luc Besson — The Fifth Element
Best Actor	Michel Serrault — The Swindle
Best Actress	Miou-Miou — Dry Cleaning
Best Screenplay	Western — Manuel Poirier, Jean-François Goyet
Best Foreign Film	Brassed Off

== See also ==
- 23rd César Awards
