= 10th Lumière Awards =

2005 French film awards ceremony

- Date: 16 February 2005
- Site: Cinéma des cinéastes, Paris, France
- Hosted by: Patrick Souquet

Highlights
- Best Film: The Chorus
- Best Director: Jean-Pierre Jeunet
- Best Actor: Mathieu Amalric
- Best Actress: Emmanuelle Devos
- Most awards: Kings and Queen (2)

The 10th Lumière Awards ceremony, presented by the Académie des Lumières, was held on 16 February 2005. The ceremony was hosted by Patrick Souquet and presided by Alain Corneau. The Chorus won the award for Best Film.

== Winners ==
Award	Winner
Best Film	The Chorus
Best Director	Jean-Pierre Jeunet — A Very Long Engagement
Best Actor	Mathieu Amalric — Kings and Queen
Best Actress	Emmanuelle Devos — Kings and Queen
Best Screenplay	Games of Love and Chance — Abdellatif Kechiche
Most Promising Actor	Damien Jouillerot — Bad Spelling
Most Promising Actress	Lola Naymark — A Common Thread & Marilou Berry — Look at Me
Best French-Language Film	Tomorrow We Move

== See also ==
- 30th César Awards
