= Lumière Award for Best Actor =

Annual French film award

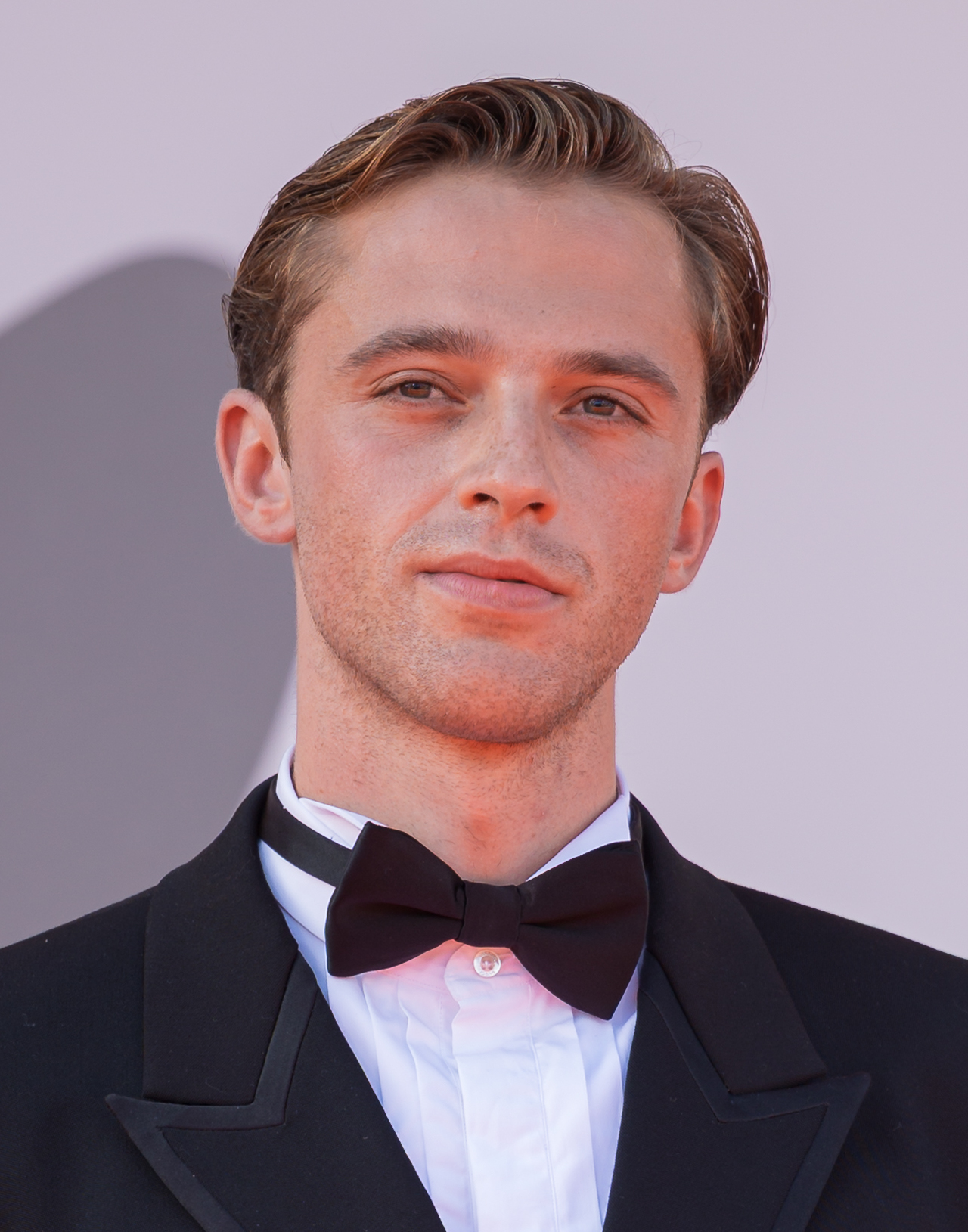
- 2026 recipient: Benjamin Voisin
- Country: France
- Presented by: Académie des Lumières
- First award: 1996
- Currently held by: Benjamin Voisin for The Stranger (2026)
- Website: academiedeslumieres.com

The Lumière Award for Best Actor (French: Lumière du meilleur acteur) is an annual award presented by the Académie des Lumières since 1996.

Michel Serrault was the first recipient for Nelly and Mr. Arnaud in 1996, while Benjamin Voisin is the most recent winner for The Stranger in 2026.

== Winners and nominees ==
Winners are listed first with a blue background, followed by the other nominees.

=== 1990s ===
| Year | Winner | English title | Original title |
|---|---|---|---|
| 1996 (1st) | Michel Serrault | Nelly and Mr. Arnaud | Nelly et Monsieur Arnaud |
| 1997 (2nd) | Charles Berling | Ridicule | |
| 1998 (3rd) | Michel Serrault | The Swindle | Rien ne va plus |
| 1999 (4th) | Jacques Villeret | The Dinner Game | Le Dîner de cons |

=== 2000s ===
| Year | Winner and nominees | English title | Original title |
|---|---|---|---|
| 2000 (5th) | Philippe Torreton | It All Starts Today | Ça commence aujourd'hui |
| 2001 (6th) | Daniel Auteuil | Sade | |
| 2002 (7th) | Michel Bouquet | How I Killed My Father | Comment j'ai tué mon père |
| 2003 (8th) | Jean Rochefort | The Man on the Train | L'Homme du train |
| 2004 (9th) | Bruno Todeschini | His Brother | Son frère |
| 2005 (10th) | Mathieu Amalric | Kings and Queen | Rois & reine |
| 2006 (11th) | Romain Duris | The Beat That My Heart Skipped | De battre mon coeur s'est arrêté |
| 2007 (12th) | Gérard Depardieu | When I Was a Singer | Quand J'étais Chanteur |
| 2007 (12th) | Lambert Wilson | Private Fears in Public Places | Cœurs |
| 2007 (12th) | François Cluzet | Tell No One | Ne le dis à personne |
| 2007 (12th) | Michel Blanc | You Are So Beautiful | Je vous trouve très beau |
| 2007 (12th) | Sacha Bourdo | The Soldier's Star | L'Étoile du soldat |
| 2008 (13th) | Mathieu Amalric | The Diving Bell and the Butterfly | Le Scaphandre et le Papillon |
| 2008 (13th) | Jean-Pierre Marielle | Let's Dance | Faut que ça danse ! |
| 2008 (13th) | Guillaume Depardieu | The Duchess of Langeais | Ne touchez pas la hache |
| 2008 (13th) | Benoît Magimel | A Girl Cut in Two | La Fille coupée en deux |
| 2008 (13th) | Benoît Magimel | 24 Bars | 24 mesures |
| 2008 (13th) | Jean-Pierre Darroussin | Le Cœur des hommes 2 | |
| 2008 (13th) | Gérard Darmon | Le Cœur des hommes 2 | |
| 2008 (13th) | Marc Lavoine | Le Cœur des hommes 2 | |
| 2008 (13th) | Bernard Campan | Le Cœur des hommes 2 | |
| 2009 (14th) | Vincent Cassel | Mesrine: Killer Instinct | Mesrine: L'Instinct de mort |
| 2009 (14th) | Vincent Cassel | Mesrine: Public Enemy Number One | Mesrine: L'Ennemi public n° 1 |
| 2009 (14th) | André Dussollier | Cortex | |
| 2009 (14th) | Claude Rich | With a Little Help from Myself | Aide-toi, le ciel t'aidera |
| 2009 (14th) | Albert Dupontel | Love Me No More | Deux jours à tuer |
| 2009 (14th) | Kad Merad | Bienvenue chez les Ch'tis | |
| 2009 (14th) | Guillaume Depardieu | Versailles | |

=== 2010s ===
| Year | Winner and nominees | English title | Original title |
|---|---|---|---|
| 2010 (15th) | Tahar Rahim | A Prophet | Un prophète |
| 2010 (15th) | François Cluzet | In the Beginning | À l'origine |
| 2010 (15th) | Yvan Attal | Rapt | |
| 2010 (15th) | Vincent Lindon | Welcome | |
| 2010 (15th) | Romain Duris | Persécution | |
| 2011 (16th) | Michael Lonsdale | Of Gods and Men | Des hommes et des dieux |
| 2011 (16th) | Lambert Wilson | Of Gods and Men | Des hommes et des dieux |
| 2011 (16th) | Lambert Wilson | The Princess of Montpensier | La Princesse de Montpensier |
| 2011 (16th) | Romain Duris | The Big Picture | L'Homme qui voulait vivre sa vie |
| 2011 (16th) | Romain Duris | Heartbreaker | L'Arnacœur |
| 2011 (16th) | Éric Elmosnino | Gainsbourg: A Heroic Life | Gainsbourg, vie héroïque |
| 2011 (16th) | Édgar Ramírez | Carlos | |
| 2012 (17th) | Omar Sy | The Intouchables | Intouchables |
| 2012 (17th) | André Wilms | Le Havre | |
| 2012 (17th) | Olivier Gourmet | The Minister | L'Exercice de l'Etat |
| 2012 (17th) | JoeyStarr | Polisse | |
| 2012 (17th) | Jean Dujardin | The Artist | |
| 2013 (18th) | Jean-Louis Trintignant | Amour | |
| 2013 (18th) | Denis Lavant | Holy Motors | |
| 2013 (18th) | Guillaume Canet | A Better Life | Une vie meilleure |
| 2013 (18th) | Jérémie Renier | My Way | Cloclo |
| 2013 (18th) | Matthias Schoenaerts | Rust and Bone | De rouille et d'os |
| 2014 (19th) | Guillaume Gallienne | Me, Myself and Mum | Les Garçons et Guillaume, à table ! |
| 2014 (19th) | Michel Bouquet | Renoir | |
| 2014 (19th) | Thierry Lhermitte | The French Minister | Quai d'Orsay |
| 2014 (19th) | Romain Duris | Mood Indigo | L'Ecume des jours |
| 2014 (19th) | Guillaume Canet | Jappeloup | |
| 2014 (19th) | Tahar Rahim | Grand Central | |
| 2015 (20th) | Gaspard Ulliel | Saint Laurent | |
| 2015 (20th) | Guillaume Canet | La Prochaine fois je viserai le cœur | |
| 2015 (20th) | Guillaume Canet | In the Name of My Daughter | L'Homme qu'on aimait trop |
| 2015 (20th) | Romain Duris | The New Girlfriend | Une nouvelle amie |
| 2015 (20th) | Mathieu Kassovitz | Wild Life | Vie sauvage |
| 2015 (20th) | Pierre Niney | Yves Saint Laurent | |
| 2015 (20th) | Benoît Poelvoorde | Three Hearts | 3 cœurs |
| 2016 (21st) | Vincent Lindon | The Measure of a Man | La Loi du marché |
| 2016 (21st) | Vincent Lindon | Diary of a Chambermaid | Journal d'une femme de chambre |
| 2016 (21st) | Gérard Depardieu | Valley of Love | |
| 2016 (21st) | André Dussollier | 21 Nights with Pattie | 21 nuits avec Pattie |
| 2016 (21st) | Fabrice Luchini | Courted | L'Hermine |
| 2016 (21st) | Vincent Macaigne | Two Friends | Les Deux Amis |
| 2016 (21st) | Jérémie Renier | The Wakhan Front | Ni le ciel ni la terre |
| 2017 (22nd) | Jean-Pierre Léaud | The Death of Louis XIV | La Mort de Louis XIV |
| 2017 (22nd) | Pierre Deladonchamps | A Kid | Le Fils de Jean |
| 2017 (22nd) | Gérard Depardieu | The End | |
| 2017 (22nd) | Nicolas Duvauchelle | A Decent Man | Je ne suis pas un salaud |
| 2017 (22nd) | Omar Sy | Chocolat | |
| 2017 (22nd) | James Thiérrée | Chocolat | |
| 2017 (22nd) | Gaspard Ulliel | It's Only the End of the World | Juste la fin du monde |
| 2018 (23rd) | Nahuel Pérez Biscayart | BPM (Beats per Minute) | 120 battements par minute |
| 2018 (23rd) | Swann Arlaud | Bloody Milk | Petit paysan |
| 2018 (23rd) | Daniel Auteuil | Le Brio | |
| 2018 (23rd) | Jean-Pierre Bacri | C'est la vie! | Le Sens de la fête |
| 2018 (23rd) | Louis Garrel | Redoubtable | Le Redoutable |
| 2018 (23rd) | Reda Kateb | Django | |
| 2019 (24th) | Alex Lutz | Guy | |
| 2019 (24th) | Romain Duris | Our Struggles | Nos batailles |
| 2019 (24th) | Vincent Lacoste | Amanda | |
| 2019 (24th) | Vincent Lindon | At War | En guerre |
| 2019 (24th) | Denis Ménochet | Custody | Jusqu'à la garde |

=== 2020s ===
| Year | Winner | English title | Original title |
|---|---|---|---|
| 2020 (25th) | Roschdy Zem | Oh Mercy! | Roubaix, une lumière |
| 2020 (25th) | Swann Arlaud | By the Grace of God | Grâce à Dieu |
| 2020 (25th) | Daniel Auteuil | La Belle Époque | |
| 2020 (25th) | Jean Dujardin | An Officer and a Spy | J'accuse |
| 2020 (25th) | Fabrice Luchini | Alice and the Mayor | Alice et le Maire |
| 2021 (26th) | Sami Bouajila | A Son | Un fils |
| 2021 (26th) | Jonathan Cohen | Enormous | Énorme |
| 2021 (26th) | Albert Dupontel | Bye Bye Morons | Adieu les cons |
| 2021 (26th) | Nicolas Maury | My Best Part | Garçon chiffon |
| 2021 (26th) | Jérémie Renier | Slalom | |
| 2022 (27th) | Benoît Magimel | Peaceful | De son vivant |
| 2022 (27th) | Damien Bonnard | The Restless | Les Intranquilles |
| 2022 (27th) | André Dussollier | Everything Went Fine | Tout s'est bien passé |
| 2022 (27th) | Vincent Lindon | Titane | |
| 2022 (27th) | Benjamin Voisin | Lost Illusions | Illusions perdues |
| 2023 (28th) | Benoît Magimel | Pacifiction | Pacifiction – Tourment sur les îles |
| 2023 (28th) | Bastien Bouillon | The Night of the 12th | La Nuit du 12 |
| 2023 (28th) | Louis Garrel | The Innocent | L'Innocent |
| 2023 (28th) | Vincent Macaigne | Diary of a Fleeting Affair | Chronique d'une liaison passagère |
| 2023 (28th) | Denis Ménochet | The Beasts | As bestas |
| 2024 (29th) | Arieh Worthalter | The Goldman Case | Le Procès Goldman |
| 2024 (29th) | Vincent Lacoste | Along Came Love | Le Temps d'aimer |
| 2024 (29th) | Karim Leklou | Vincent Must Die | Vincent doit mourir |
| 2024 (29th) | Melvil Poupaud | Just the Two of Us | L'Amour et les Forêts |
| 2024 (29th) | Franz Rogowski | Disco Boy | |
| 2025 (30th) | Abou Sangaré | Souleymane's Story | L'Histoire de Souleymane |
| 2025 (30th) | Adam Bessa | Ghost Trail | Les Fantômes |
| 2025 (30th) | Paul Kircher | And Their Children After Them | Leurs enfants après eux |
| 2025 (30th) | Karim Leklou | Jim's Story | Le Roman de Jim |
| 2025 (30th) | Pierre Niney | The Count of Monte Cristo | Le Comte de Monte-Cristo |
| 2026 (31st) | Benjamin Voisin | The Stranger | L'Étranger |
| 2026 (31st) | Swann Arlaud | La Condition | |
| 2026 (31st) | Claes Bang | The Great Arch | L'Inconnu de la Grande Arche |
| 2026 (31st) | Laurent Lafitte | The Richest Woman in the World | La femme la plus riche du monde |
| 2026 (31st) | Alexis Manenti | The Mohican | Le Mohican |

== Trivia ==
=== Multiple awards ===
==== 2 awards ====
- Mathieu Amalric
- Benoît Magimel
- Michel Serrault

=== Multiple nominees ===
==== 6 nominations ====
- Romain Duris

==== 4 nominations ====
- Vincent Lindon

==== 3 nominations ====
- Swann Arlaud
- Daniel Auteuil
- Guillaume Canet
- Gérard Depardieu
- André Dussollier
- Benoît Magimel
- Jérémie Renier

==== 2 nominations ====
- Mathieu Amalric
- Michel Bouquet
- François Cluzet
- Guillaume Depardieu
- Jean Dujardin
- Albert Dupontel
- Louis Garrel
- Vincent Lacoste
- Karim Leklou
- Fabrice Luchini
- Vincent Macaigne
- Denis Ménochet
- Pierre Niney
- Tahar Rahim
- Michel Serrault
- Omar Sy
- Gaspard Ulliel
- Benjamin Voisin
- Lambert Wilson

== See also ==
- César Award for Best Actor
