= 1st Lumière Awards =

1996 French film awards ceremony

- Date: 29 January 1996
- Site: Paris, France

Highlights
- Best Film: La Haine
- Best Director: Mathieu Kassovitz
- Best Actor: Michel Serrault
- Best Actress: Isabelle Huppert
- Most awards: La Haine (2)

Television coverage
- Network: Paris Première

The 1st Lumière Awards ceremony, presented by the Académie des Lumières, was held on 29 January 1996. It was presented at the time as the Lumières de Paris. The ceremony was chaired by Isabella Rossellini. La Haine won two awards including Best Film and Best Director.

== Winners ==
Award	Winner
Best Film	La Haine
Best Director	Mathieu Kassovitz — La Haine
Best Actor	Michel Serrault — Nelly and Mr. Arnaud
Best Actress	Isabelle Huppert — La Cérémonie
Best Screenplay	French Twist — Josiane Balasko and Patrick Aubrée
Best Foreign Film	Underground

== See also ==
- 21st César Awards
