= 4th Lumière Awards =

1999 French film awards ceremony

- Date: 16 January 1999
- Site: Paris, France

Highlights
- Best Film: The Dreamlife of Angels
- Best Director: Erick Zonca
- Best Actor: Jacques Villeret
- Best Actress: Élodie Bouchez
- Most awards: The Dreamlife of Angels (3)

Television coverage
- Network: France 2

The 4th Lumière Awards ceremony, presented by the Académie des Lumières, was held on 16 January 1999. The ceremony was chaired by Jean Reno. The Dreamlife of Angels won three awards including Best Film, Best Director and Best Actress.

== Winners ==
Award	Winner
Best Film	The Dreamlife of Angels
Best Director	Erick Zonca — The Dreamlife of Angels
Best Actor	Jacques Villeret — Le Dîner de Cons
Best Actress	Élodie Bouchez — The Dreamlife of Angels
Best Screenplay	Le Dîner de Cons — Francis Veber
Best Foreign Film	Life Is Beautiful

== See also ==
- 24th César Awards
