= 8th Lumière Awards =

2003 French cinema awards

- Date: 14 February 2003
- Site: Forum des images, Paris, France
- Hosted by: Frédéric Mitterrand

Highlights
- Best Film: Amen.
- Best Director: François Ozon
- Best Actor: Jean Rochefort
- Best Actress: Isabelle Carré
- Most awards: L'Auberge Espagnole (2)

The 8th Lumière Awards ceremony, presented by the Académie des Lumières, was held on 14 February 2003. The ceremony was hosted by Frédéric Mitterrand and presided by Carole Laure. Amen. won the award for Best Film.

== Winners ==
Award	Winner
Best Film	Amen.
Best Director	François Ozon — 8 Women
Best Actor	Jean Rochefort — The Man on the Train
Best Actress	Isabelle Carré — Beautiful Memories
Best Screenplay	L'Auberge Espagnole — Cédric Klapisch
Most Promising Actor	Gaspard Ulliel — Summer Things
Most Promising Actress	Cécile de France — L'Auberge Espagnole
Best French-Language Film	The Son

== See also ==
- 28th César Awards
