= 9th Lumière Awards =

2004 French film awards ceremony

- Date: 17 February 2004
- Site: Cinéma des cinéastes, Paris, France
- Hosted by: Patrick Souquet

Highlights
- Best Film: The Triplets of Belleville
- Best Director: Alain Resnais
- Best Actor: Bruno Todeschini
- Best Actress: Sylvie Testud

The 9th Lumière Awards ceremony, presented by the Académie des Lumières, was held on 17 February 2004. The ceremony was hosted by Patrick Souquet and presided by Patrice Chéreau. The Triplets of Belleville won the award for Best Film.

== Winners ==
| Award | Winner |
|---|---|
| Best Film | The Triplets of Belleville |
| Best Director | Alain Resnais — Not on the Lips |
| Best Actor | Bruno Todeschini — His Brother |
| Best Actress | Sylvie Testud — Fear and Trembling |
| Best Screenplay | Since Otar Left — Julie Bertuccelli and Bernard Renucci |
| Most Promising Actor | Grégori Derangère — Bon Voyage |
| Most Promising Actress | Sasha Andres — She's One of Us |
| Best French-Language Film | The Barbarian Invasions |

== See also ==
- 29th César Awards
