= 7th Lumière Awards =

2002 French film awards ceremony

- Date: 25 February 2002
- Site: Hôtel de Crillon, Paris, France

Highlights
- Best Film: Amélie
- Best Director: Patrice Chéreau
- Best Actor: Michel Bouquet
- Best Actress: Audrey Tautou
- Most awards: Amélie (3)

The 7th Lumière Awards ceremony, presented by the Académie des Lumières, was held on 25 February 2002. The winners were announced at a press conference at the Hôtel de Crillon in Paris. Amélie won three awards including Best Film, Best Actress and Best Screenplay.

== Winners ==
Award	Winner
Best Film	Amélie
Best Director	Patrice Chéreau — Intimacy
Best Actor	Michel Bouquet — How I Killed My Father
Best Actress	Audrey Tautou — Amélie
Best Screenplay	Amélie — Jean-Pierre Jeunet and Guillaume Laurant
Most Promising Actor	Abdel Halis — 17, rue Bleue
Most Promising Actress	Rachida Brakni — Chaos
Best Foreign Film	Billy Elliot

== See also ==
- 27th César Awards
