= Comedy of Power =

2006 film

- Film poster
- Directed by: Claude Chabrol
- Written by: Claude Chabrol; Odile Barski
- Produced by: Françoise Galfré
- Starring: Isabelle Huppert; François Berléand; Patrick Bruel
- Cinematography: Eduardo Serra
- Edited by: Monique Fardoulis
- Music by: Matthieu Chabrol
- Distributed by: Pan-Européenne
- Release dates: 16 February 2006 (Berlin); 22 February 2006 (France)
- Running time: 110 minutes
- Country: France
- Language: French
- Budget: $8.2 million
- Box office: $9 million

Comedy of Power (French: L'Ivresse du pouvoir) is a 2006 French drama film directed by Claude Chabrol and starring Isabelle Huppert. The French title means "drunk with power". The film is loosely based on a true story involving the French former oil and gas company Elf Aquitaine and judge Eva Joly.

== Plot ==
Humeau, head of a major state-owned company, is arrested for abuse of funds and interrogated by the implacable prosecutor, Jeanne Charmant-Killman. As she uncovers more and more hidden corruption, implicating politicians and foreign powers, both subtle and brutal methods are used to stop her. Intoxicated with the power of rooting out evil, her private life disintegrates and after an apparent suicide attempt, her unhappy husband ends up in intensive care. At the hospital she sees Humeau, another man whose health is broken by his ordeal. The audience is left to wonder how many more victims she will amass or whether she will herself succumb to the increasing pressure.

== Cast ==
- Isabelle Huppert as Jeanne Charmant-Killman
- François Berléand as Michel Humeau
- Patrick Bruel as Jacques Sibaud
- Marilyne Canto as Erika
- Robin Renucci as Philippe Charmant-Killman
- Thomas Chabrol as Félix
- Jean-François Balmer as Boldi
- Pierre Vernier as President Martino
- Jacques Boudet as Descarts
- Philippe Duclos as Jean-Baptiste Holéo
- Roger Dumas as René Lange
- Jean-Christophe Bouvet as Me Parlebas
- Jean-Marie Winling as The man of power
- Stéphane Debac as The cop
- Jacky Nercessian

== See also ==
- Isabelle Huppert on screen and stage
