= Camille Rewinds =

2012 film

- Film poster
- Directed by: Noémie Lvovsky
- Written by: Noémie Lvovsky; Florence Seyvos; Pierre-Olivier Mattei; Maud Ameline
- Produced by: Philippe Carcassonne; Jean-Louis Livi
- Starring: Noémie Lvovsky; Yolande Moreau
- Cinematography: Jean-Marc Fabre
- Edited by: Annette Dutertre; Michel Klochendler
- Music by: Gaetan Roussel; Joseph Dahan
- Distributed by: Gaumont
- Release dates: 25 May 2012 (Cannes); 12 September 2012
- Running time: 120 minutes
- Country: France
- Language: French
- Budget: $7.2 million
- Box office: $7.2 million

Camille Rewinds (French: Camille redouble) is a 2012 French drama film directed by Noémie Lvovsky. The film was screened in the Directors' Fortnight section at the 2012 Cannes Film Festival where it won the Prix SACD. Yolande Moreau received a Magritte Award for Best Supporting Actress for her role.

== Plot ==
On her way to a party Camille consults a quirky clockmaker because she needs to have her watch fixed. The watch has sentimental value for her because she got it as a present for her 16th birthday. Next morning Camille realises it is the year 1985 and she is again a teenager.

== Cast ==
- Noémie Lvovsky as Camille Vaillant
- Samir Guesmi as Éric
- Judith Chemla as Josepha
- India Hair as Alice
- Julia Faure as Louise
- Yolande Moreau as Camille's mother
- Michel Vuillermoz as Camille's father
- Denis Podalydès as Alphonse Da Costa, the physics professor
- Jean-Pierre Léaud as Monsieur Dupont, the clock-maker
- Vincent Lacoste as Vincent
- Anne Alvaro as The English teacher, whom Camille or her friend ask to adopt her
- Mathieu Amalric as The French teacher (sadist or mean)
- Micha Lescot, the drama teacher and director of the play
- Riad Sattouf as The director
- Esther Garrel as Mathilde

== Reception ==
The movie received mixed reviews from critics. Review aggregator Rotten Tomatoes reports that 60% of 5 critics gave the film a positive review, for an average rating of 5/10.
