= Lumière Awards =

French film award

- Current: 31st Lumière Awards
- The Lumière trophy since 2018
- Awarded for: Excellence in Francophone cinema
- Country: France
- Presented by: Académie des Lumières
- First award: 1996
- Website: academiedeslumieres.com

The Lumière Awards (French: Prix Lumières), officially the Lumières de la presse internationale, are French film awards presented by the Académie des Lumières to honor the best in the French-speaking cinema of the previous year. The awards ceremony is organized by the Académie des Lumières which consists of over 200 representatives of the international press based in Paris. Today they are regarded as one of the most prestigious French film industry awards, and are considered France's equivalent to the Golden Globe Awards.

== History ==
The Lumière Awards were initiated in 1995 by French producer Daniel Toscan du Plantier and American journalist and ex-Newsweek's Paris correspondent Edward Behr. Their idea was to replicate the Golden Globes, which were presented by the Hollywood Foreign Press Association. The Lumière Awards is usually presented a month before the César Awards, the French national film award. Le Figaro described the Lumières as "one of the barometers of the French awards season and are a good indication of the films that will be acclaimed by the César Awards, when they are nominated in January".

== Directing Board ==
The president of the Academy is Lisa Nesselson, the vice-presidents are Pamela Bienzobas and José Maria Riba, the treasurer is Min Liu, the general secretary is Jacques Kermabon and the general delegate is Anne Guimet.

== Award categories ==
=== Current categories ===
- Best Film: since 1996
- Best Director: since 1996
- Best Actor: since 1996
- Best Actress: since 1996
- Best Screenplay: since 1996
- Best Male Revelation: since 2000
- Best Female Revelation: since 2000
- Best First Film: since 2014
- Best Cinematography: since 2008
- Best Music: since 2016
- Best Documentary: since 2016
- Best Animated Film: since 2017
- Best International Co-Production: since 2020
- Honorary Lumière Award

=== Discontinued categories ===
- World Audience Award
- Special Jury Prize
- Best Foreign Film
- Best French-Language Film

== Ceremonies ==
Edition	Date	President(s)	Best Film
1st Lumière Awards	29 January 1996	Isabella Rossellini	La Haine
2nd Lumière Awards	13 January 1997	Philippe Noiret	Ridicule
3rd Lumière Awards	15 December 1998	Fanny Ardant	Marius and Jeannette
4th Lumière Awards	16 January 1999	Jean Reno	The Dreamlife of Angels
5th Lumière Awards	2 February 2000	Claudia Cardinale	The Messenger: The Story of Joan of Arc
6th Lumière Awards	24 January 2001	Frédéric Lopez	The Taste of Others
7th Lumière Awards	25 February 2002		Amélie
8th Lumière Awards	14 February 2003	Carole Laure	Amen.
9th Lumière Awards	17 February 2004	Patrice Chéreau	The Triplets of Belleville
10th Lumière Awards	16 February 2005	Alain Corneau	The Chorus
11th Lumière Awards	21 February 2006	Claudia Cardinale	The Beat That My Heart Skipped
12th Lumière Awards	5 February 2007	Isabelle Mergault	Tell No One
13th Lumière Awards	13 January 2008	Claude Lelouch	The Diving Bell and the Butterfly
14th Lumière Awards	19 January 2009	Jeanne Balibar	The Class
15th Lumière Awards	15 January 2010	Régis Wargnier	Welcome
16th Lumière Awards	14 January 2011	François Berléand	Of Gods and Men
17th Lumière Awards	13 January 2012	Catherine Jacob	The Artist
18th Lumière Awards	18 January 2013	Victoria Abril	Amour
19th Lumière Awards	20 January 2014	Carole Bouquet	Blue Is the Warmest Colour
20th Lumière Awards	2 February 2015	Claudia Cardinale, Victoria Abril, Jeanne Balibar, and Catherine Jacob	Timbuktu
21st Lumière Awards	8 February 2016		Mustang
22nd Lumière Awards	30 January 2017		Elle
23rd Lumière Awards	5 February 2018		BPM (Beats per Minute)
24th Lumière Awards	4 February 2019		The Sisters Brothers
25th Lumière Awards	27 January 2020		Les Misérables
26th Lumière Awards	19 January 2021		Love Affair(s)
27th Lumière Awards	17 January 2022		Happening
28th Lumière Awards	16 January 2023		The Night of the 12th
29th Lumière Awards	22 January 2024		Anatomy of a Fall
30th Lumière Awards	20 January 2025		Emilia Pérez

== See also ==
- César Awards
- Louis Delluc Prize
- Magritte Awards
- Golden Globe Awards
