= Nadim Cheikhrouha =

Film producer

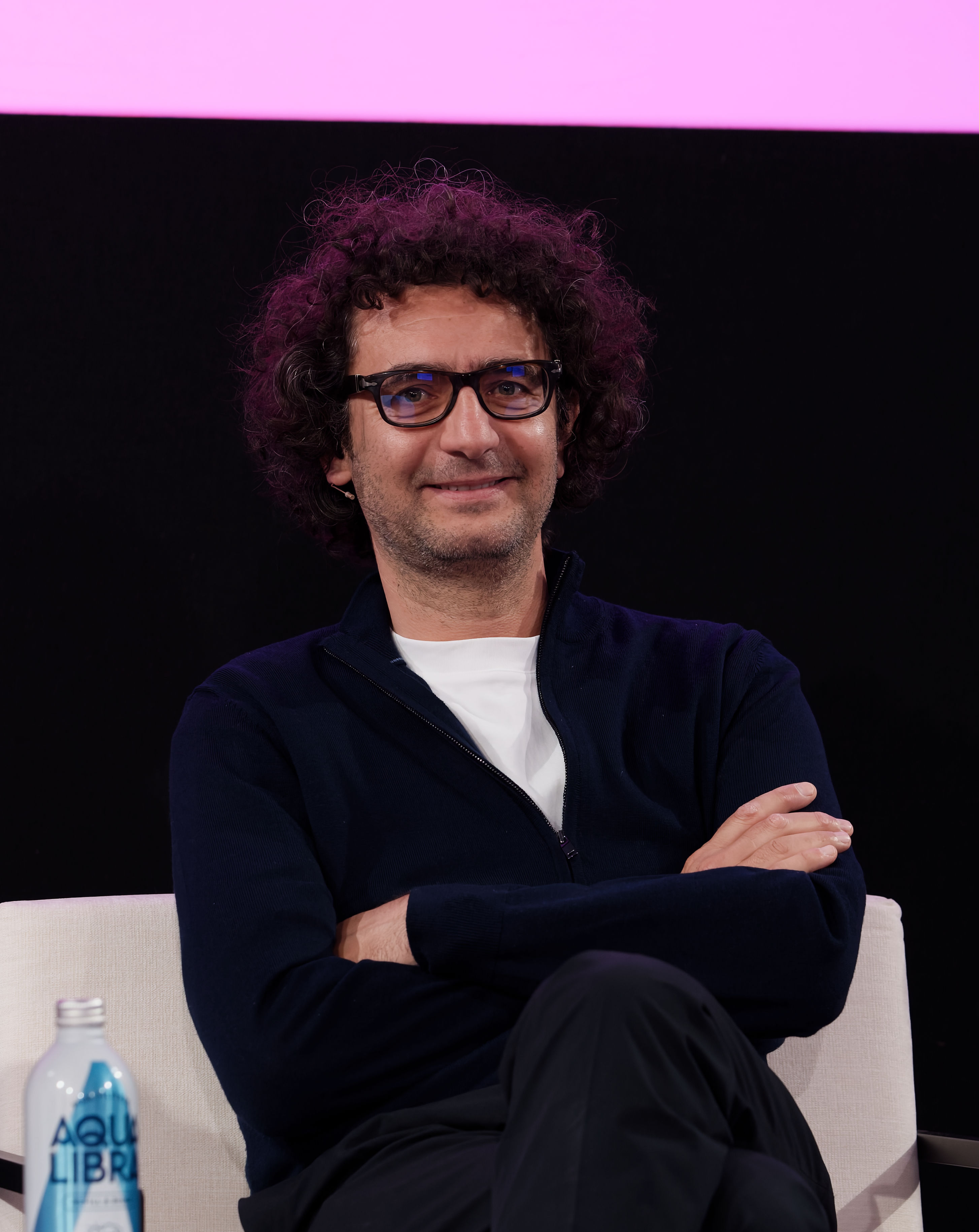
- Cheikhrouha in 2026
- Occupation: Film producer
- Years active: 2006-present

Nadim Cheikhrouha (Arabic: نديم شيخوها) is a French-Tunisian film producer, and founder of Tanit Films. Cheikhrouha has produced The Man Who Sold His Skin (2020), Four Daughters (2023), Behind the Mountains (2023), Who Do I Belong To (2024) and The Voice of Hind Rajab (2025). Cheikhrouha is the recipient of a César Award, Independent Spirit Award and Gotham Award. He has also received an Academy Award nomination.

== Early life ==
Cheikhrouha graduated from HEC Paris.

== Career ==
Cheikhrouha previously worked at TF1 Film Production, TPS Cinema, Mandarin Films, and served as an associate producer at Screen Runner and Jade Productions. In 2010, he served as a producer on Benda Bilili! for which he earned a César Award for Best Documentary Film nomination. In 2014, Cheikhrouha founded the production company Tanit Films.

Cheikhrouha is a frequent collaborator of Kaouther Ben Hania. He has served as a producer on Beauty and the Dogs, The Man Who Sold His Skin, Four Daughters for which he received a nomination for the Academy Award for Best Documentary Feature Film. and won a César Award, Independent Spirit Award, and Gotham Award. The Voice of Hind Rajab, and Mimesis.

He has also served as a producer on Behind the Mountains by Mohamed Ben Attia, and Who Do I Belong To by Meryam Joobeur.
