= List of Tunisian submissions for the Academy Award for Best International Feature Film =

Best International Feature Film submissions from Tunisia

Highlights
- Debut: 1995
- Submissions: 12
- Nominations: 2
- Oscar winners: none

Tunisia has submitted films for the Academy Award for Best International Feature Film (Note: The category was previously named the Academy Award for Best Foreign Language Film, but this was changed to the Academy Award for Best International Feature Film in April 2019, after the Academy deemed the word "Foreign" to be outdated.) on an irregular basis since 1995. The award is handed out annually by the United States Academy of Motion Picture Arts and Sciences to a feature-length motion picture produced outside the United States that contains primarily non-English dialogue.

As of 2026, Tunisia was nominated twice for The Man Who Sold His Skin (2020) and The Voice of Hind Rajab (2025).

== Submissions ==
The Academy of Motion Picture Arts and Sciences has invited the film industries of various countries to submit their best film for the Academy Award for Best International Feature Film since 1956. The International Feature Film Committee oversees the process and reviews all the submitted films. Following this, they vote via secret ballot to determine the five nominees for the award.

Kaouther Ben Hania is the only Tunisian filmmaker to ever be nominated, being nominated for The Man Who Sold His Skin (2020) and The Voice of Hind Rajab (2025). Her documentary Four Daughters (2023) made into the fifteen films shortlist, but was not nominated, although it was nominated for Best Documentary.

Below is a list of the films that have been submitted by Tunisia for review by the Academy for the award by year and the respective Academy Awards ceremony.

Year (Ceremony)	Film title used in nomination	Original title	Language(s)	Director	Result
1995 (68th)	The Magic	Le magique	Arabic, French	Azdine Melliti	Not nominated
2002 (75th)	The Magic Box	La Boîte magique	French, Arabic	Ridha Behi	Not nominated
2016 (89th)	As I Open My Eyes	À peine j'ouvre les yeux	Tunisian Arabic, French	Leyla Bouzid	Not on the final list
2017 (90th)	The Last of Us		No dialogue	Ala Eddine Slim	Not nominated
2018 (91st)	Beauty and the Dogs	على كف عفريت	Arabic	Kaouther Ben Hania	Not nominated
2019 (92nd)	Dear Son	ولدي	Arabic	Mohamed Ben Attia	Not nominated
2020 (93rd)	The Man Who Sold His Skin	الرجل الذي باع ظهره	Arabic, English, French	Kaouther Ben Hania	Nominated
2021 (94th)	Golden Butterfly	الفراشة الذهبية	Arabic, French	Abdelhamid Bouchnak	Not nominated
2022 (95th)	Under the Fig Trees	تحت الشجرة	Arabic	Erige Sehiri	Not nominated
2023 (96th)	Four Daughters	بنات ألفة	Arabic	Kaouther Ben Hania	Made shortlist
2024 (97th)	Take My Breath	المباين	Arabic	Nada Mezni Hafaiedh	Not nominated
2025 (98th)	The Voice of Hind Rajab	صوت هند رجب	Arabic	Kaouther Ben Hania	Nominated

== See also ==
- List of Academy Award winners and nominees for Best International Feature Film
- List of Academy Award-winning foreign language films
- Cinema of Tunisia
