= Behind the Mountains =

- Directed by: Mohamed Ben Attia
- Screenplay by: Mohamed Ben Attia
- Starring: Majd Mastoura
- Cinematography: Frédéric Noirhomme
- Edited by: Lenka Fillnerova
- Music by: Olivier Marguerit
- Release date: 2023
- Language: Arabic

Behind the Mountains (Arabic: ورا الجبل, romanized: Oura el Jebel, French: Par-delà les montagnes) is a 2023 supernatural drama film written and directed by Mohamed Ben Attia.

The film premiered at the Horizons section of the 80th edition of the Venice Film Festival.

== Cast ==
- Majd Mastoura as Rafik
- Walid Bouchhioua as Yassine
- Samer Bisharat as the Shepherd
- Helmi Dridi as Wejdi
- Selma Zeghidi as Najwa
- Wissem Belgharek as Oussama

== Production ==
The film is an international co-production between Tunisia, Belgium, France, Italy, Saudi Arabia and Qatar. It was co-produced by the Dardenne brothers. It has been described as 'the culmination of an informal trilogy from Mohamed Ben Attia', consisting of director's previous efforts Hedi (2016) and Dear Son (2018).

== Release ==
The film premiered at the Horizons section of the 80th Venice International Film Festival. It was later screened in other festivals, including the BFI London Film Festival, the Red Sea International Film Festival, the Gothenburg Film Festival, the Marrakech International Film Festival and the Thessaloniki International Film Festival.

== Reception ==
According to Screen International critic Lee Marshall the film is 'a striking piece of filmmaking that lingers stubbornly in the mind' and a 'further proof of the current vitality of North African cinema'. Carlos Aguilar from Variety described it as an 'unorthodox, yet fascinating [...] unpredictable oddity of a film'. Libération critic Laura Tuillier referred to it as 'often untidy, messy and bordering on the ridiculous, [...] yet rich in its narrative daring, and in its hot-headed approach'.
