= Dea Liane =

French actress

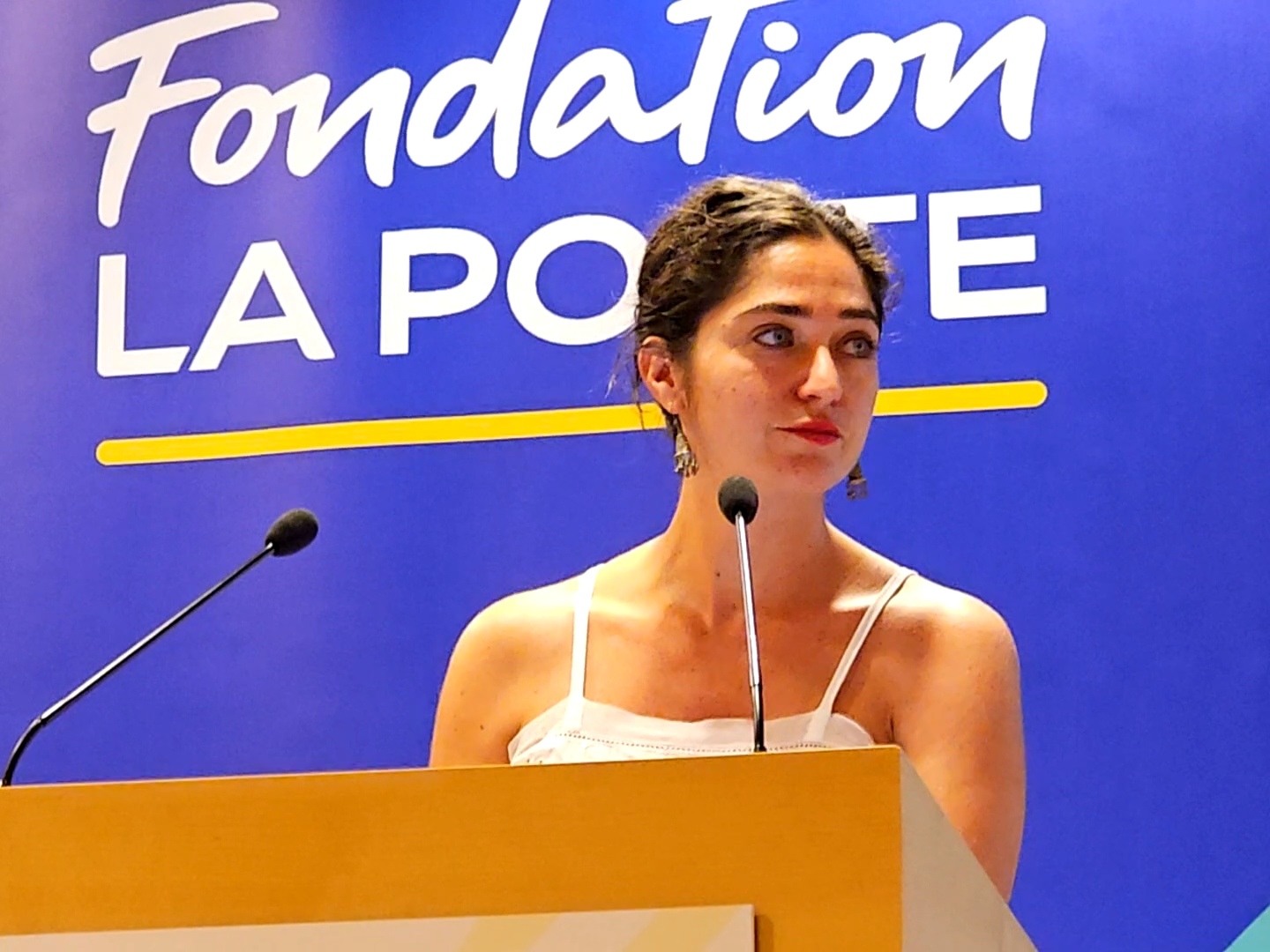
- Born: Dea Liane; France
- Occupation: actress
- Years active: 2013–present
- Known for: The Man Who Sold His Skin

Dea Liane is a French actress. She is known for the role of Abeer in the Tunisian movie The Man Who Sold His Skin. She is also a writer.

== Career ==
Liane began her career as a stage actress.

In 2019, she acted in the Tunisian film The Man Who Sold His Skin directed by Kaouther Ben Hania. In the film, she played the leading role, Abeer, along with Yahya Mahayni. Her performance was praised by the critics. The film was selected as the Tunisian entry for the Best International Feature Film at the 93rd Academy Awards. In March 2021, the film was nominated for Best International Feature Film. It was screened in the Horizons section at the 77th Venice International Film Festival.

In 2024 she appeared as Reem in Who Do I Belong To (Mé el Aïn) by Meryam Joobeur (2024).

In 2023 she published a novel, Georgette.

== Filmography ==
Year	Film	Role	Genre	Ref.
2020	Retour à la nuit	Esther	Short film	
2020	The Man Who Sold His Skin	Abeer	Film	
2024	Who Do I Belong To (Mé el Aïn)	Reem	Film	
