= Mimesis (disambiguation) =

Mimesis is a philosophical concept.

It may also refer to:

- Linguistic mimesis, a concept in phonaesthetics
- Mimesis (biology), a form of biological mimicry in which the mimic takes on the properties of a specific object or organism, but one to which the dupe is indifferent
- Mimesis (magazine), a quarterly literary magazine
- Mimesis (mathematics), the quality of a numerical method which imitates some properties of the continuum problem
- Mimesis: The Representation of Reality in Western Literature, a book of literary criticism by Erich Auerbach
- Mimesis: Night of the Living Dead, also known as Mimesis, a 2011 horror film directed by Douglas Schulze
- Mimesis (upcoming film), a drama film written and directed by Kaouther Ben Hania
- Mimesis, a 2008 album by End of You
- "Mimesis", a song by Fontaines D.C. from the album Dopamine Chamber

== See also ==
- Mimetic (disambiguation)
