= Mimesis (upcoming film) =

Upcoming drama film

- Directed by: Kaouther Ben Hania
- Written by: Kaouther Ben Hania
- Produced by: Nadim Cheikhrouha
- Starring: Lyne Ben Brika; Selim Chebbi; Riadh Aloui Nahdi; Rim Riahi; Fatma Ben Saïdane
- Cinematography: Juan Sarmiento G.
- Production companies: Tanit Films; Arte France Cinéma; ma.ja.de Filmproduktions; Laika Film & Television; Kwassa Films; Mime Films; ZDF; Proximus; BeTV
- Distributed by: Jour2fête
- Countries: France; Belgium; Germany; Sweden; Tunisia
- Language: Arabic

Mimesis is an upcoming internationally co-produced drama film written and directed by Kaouther Ben Hania. It stars Lyne Ben Brika, Selim Chebbi, Riadh Aloui Nahdi, Rim Riahi and Fatma Ben Saïdane.

== Cast ==
- Lyne Ben Brika
- Selim Chebbi
- Riadh Aloui Nahdi
- Rim Riahi
- Fatma Ben Saïdane

== Production ==
In May 2023, it was announced Kaouther Ben Hania would write and direct the film, with Jour2fête set to distribute in France. Initially set to commence production in 2024, it was postponed to allow Ben Hania to shoot and release The Voice of Hind Rajab in 2025.

In September 2025, it was announced Lyne Ben Brika, Selim Chebbi, Riadh Aloui Nahdi, Rim Riahi and Fatma Ben Saïdane had joined the cast of the film, with principal photography commencing in France and Tunisia.
