= Maria Gracia Turgeon =

Canadian film producer

Maria Gracia Turgeon is a Canadian film producer from Quebec, who was cofounder with Annick Blanc of the Midi La Nuit film studio.

== Filmography ==
- Abigaëlle - 2014
- Inner Jellyfishes (Les Méduses) - 2015
- What Remains (Ce qu'il reste) - 2016
- Oh What a Wonderful Feeling - 2016
- Born in the Maelstrom - 2017
- Pre-Drink - 2017
- Fauve - 2018
- How Tommy Lemenchick Became a Grade 7 Legend - 2018
- The Colour of Your Lips (La couleur de tes lèvres) - 2018
- Brotherhood (Ikhwène) - 2018
- Tibbits Hill - 2021
- Who Do I Belong To - 2024
- Hunting Daze (Jour de chasse) - 2024
- Where the River Begins (Donde comenzia el rio) - 2026

== Awards ==
Award	Date of ceremony	Category	Work	Result	Ref.
Academy Awards	2019	Best Live Action Short Film	Fauve with Jérémy Comte	Nominated	
Academy Awards	2020	Best Live Action Short Film	Brotherhood with Meryam Joobeur	Nominated	
Canadian Screen Awards	2018	Best Live Action Short Drama	Pre-Drink with Marc-Antoine Lemire	Nominated	
Canadian Screen Awards	2019	Best Live Action Short Drama	Fauve with Jérémy Comte, Evren Boisjoli	Won	
Canadian Screen Awards	2019	Best Live Action Short Drama	The Colour of Your Lips (La couleur de tes lèvres) with Annick Blanc	Nominated	
Canadian Screen Awards	2025	Best Motion Picture	Who Do I Belong To with Annick Blanc	Nominated	
Prix Iris	2018	Best Live Action Short Film	Pre-Drink with Marc-Antoine Lemire	Won	
Prix Iris	2019	Best Live Action Short Film	Brotherhood with Meryam Joobeur, Habib Attia, Sarra Ben-Hassen, Andreas Rocksén	Won	
Prix Iris	2019	Best Live Action Short Film	Fauve with Jérémy Comte, Evren Boisjoli	Nominated	
