= Madih Belaid =

Tunisian filmmaker

Madih Belaïd مديح بالعيد
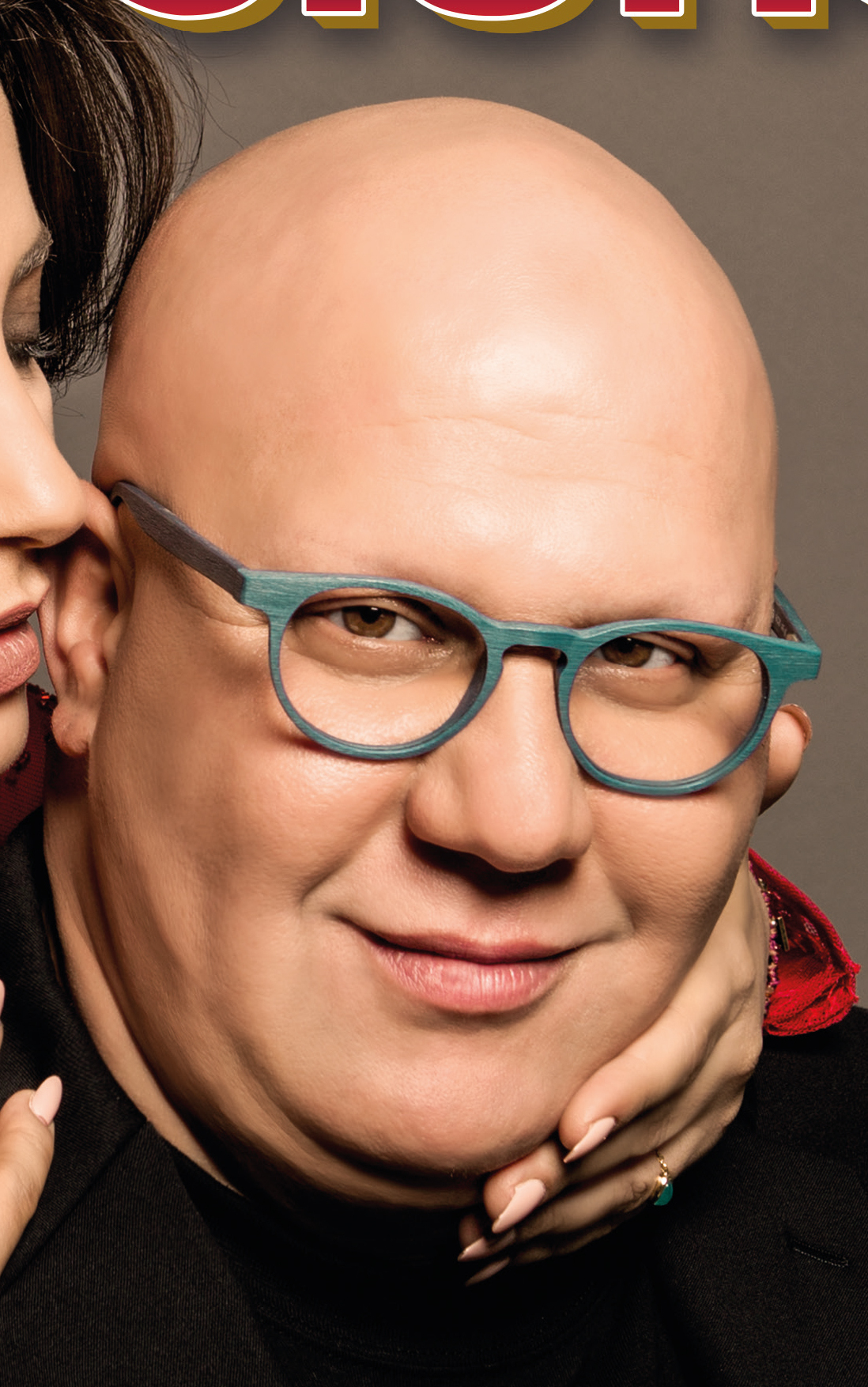
- Born: Madih Belaïd; January 1, 1974 (age 52); Sousse, Tunisia
- Education: Maghrebian Institute of Cinema
- Occupation: Director
- Years active: 1996–present
- Spouse: Rim Riahi

Madih Belaïd (born 1 January 1974), is a Tunisian filmmaker. He is best known as the director of critically acclaimed television serials and feature films Naouret El Hawa, Al Akaber and Allo.

== Personal life ==
He was born on 1 January 1974 in Sousse, Tunisia. He is married to Tunisian actress Rim Riahi where the couple has three children.

== Career ==
He studied filmmaking at the Maghrebian Institute of Cinema in Tunis from 1994 to 1997. After various internships in audiovisual and directing, he became assistant director on several shoots in Tunisia and abroad and took part in scriptwriting workshops in France, Germany and Morocco. In 1996, he wrote and directed first short films: Tout bouille rien ne bouge. Then he directed his graduation film, Croix X in 2006 as the second short. With the success of the two shorts, he made his third short L'Ascenseur in 2007 and later Allô in 2008.

In 2014, he received the prize for best production for the soap opera Naouret El Hawa at the Romdhane Awards awarded by Mosaïque FM. In the same year, he was appointed as a jury member for the second edition of the Les Nuits du court métrage Tunisien festival in Paris. In 2016, he won the award for Best Director for the soap opera Al Akaber at the Romdhane Awards.

== Filmography ==
Year	Film	Writer	Role	Genre	Ref.
1996	Everything is boiling. Nothing is moving		Director	movie	
1998	The sky under the desert	Alberto Negrin	Assistant Director	TV movie	
1999	A woman as a friend 2 (it)	Rossella Izzo	Assistant Director	TV series	
2000	The origins and the start of Islam (Series of five documentaries)	Tahsin Celal	First assistant director	movie	
2001	Dhafayer (Braids)	Habib Mselmani	Assistant director	TV series	
2001	Quo vadis ? (What's going on?)	Jerzy Kawalerowicz	First assistant director	TV movie	
2001	I cavalieri che fecero l'impresa (The Knights of the Quest)	Pupi Avati	First assistant director	TV movie	
2002	Dima Labes (we are always fine)	Nejib Belkadhi	Assistant director	TV series	
2002	Khorma	Jilani Saadi	Assistant director	TV movie	
2003	The cursed island	Rémy Burkel	Assistant director	TV movie	
2003	The Last Day of Pompéi	Peter Nicholson	Assistant director	docufiction	
2003	Kalthoum's Daughter	Mehdi Charef	First assistant director	TV movie	
2004	Summer Wedding	Mokhtar Ladjimi	Assistant Director	movie	
2004	Gladiators	Tilman Remme	Assistant Director	docufiction	
2004	La Chorale du bonheur (The choir of happiness)	Kay Pollak	First assistant director	TV movie	
2004	Rameses (docufiction)	Tom Pollack	First assistant director	TV movie	
2004	La squadra (The team) (TV film)	Francesco Pavolini	First assistant director	TV movie	
2004	The villa	Mohamed Damak and Mohamed Mahfoudh	Assistant Director	movie	
2005	Romanticism : Two tablets morning and evening	Mohamed Ben Attia	First assistant director	TV movie	
2005	Ancient Plastic Surgery (en) (docufiction)	Philip J. Day	First assistant director	TV movie	
2006	The children and the sea		Director	TV Series	
2007	The elevator		Director	movie	
2008	Nine Miles Down (en)	Anthony Waller	First assistant director	TV movie	
2008	Cross X		Director	movie	
2008	Allo		Director	Short film	
2008	Give me your ear		Director	TV Series	
2009-2011	Njoum Ellil (Stars of the night)	Mehdi Nasra, Samia Amami, Saâd Ben Hussein and Abdelhakim Alimi	Director	TV Series	
2010	The Last Hour	Aly Abidy	First assistant director	TV movie	
2010	Augustine: The Decline of the Roman Empire	Christian Duguay	Assistant director	TV movie	
2012	The escape from Carthage		Director	TV movie	
2012	Maria di Nazaret (it) (TV film)	Giacomo Campiotti	First assistant director	TV movie	
2014-2015	Windmill	Anis Ben Dali, Nazli Ferial Kallal, Maroua Ben Jemai and Ghanem Zrelli	Riadh Smaâli and Sana Bouazizi	Director	TV series
2015	Promotional spot for the Tunespoir association		Director	TV mini-series	
2016	Al Akaber (The Upper class)	Mohamed Aziz Houwam, Mohamed Ali Damak and Houssem Sahli	Director	TV mini-series	
2017-2018	El Khawa	Sara Britma	Director	TV series	
2019	Ali Chouerreb (season 2)	Rania Mlika and Rabii Tekali	Director	TV Series	
