= Annick Blanc =

Canadian film director and producer

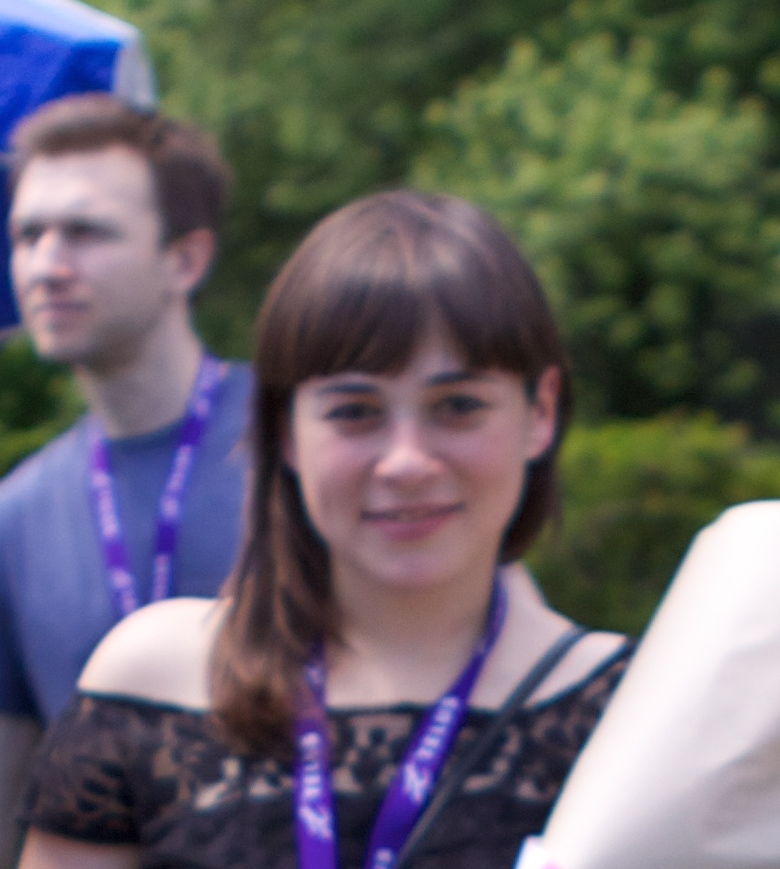
- Years active: 2010s–present

Annick Blanc is a Canadian film director and producer. She is most noted as a two-time Canadian Screen Award nominee for Best Live Action Short Drama, receiving nods at the 6th Canadian Screen Awards in 2018 as producer of Plain and Simple (Tout simplement), and at the 7th Canadian Screen Awards in 2019 as director of The Colour of Your Lips (La couleur de tes lèvres).

She was co-founder with Maria Gracia Turgeon of the Midi La Nuit film studio.

Her feature directorial debut, Hunting Daze (Jour de chasse), premiered in 2024.

== Filmography ==
=== Producer ===
- Nowhere Elsewhere (Au milieu de nulle part ailleurs) - 2010
- Mars & Venus - 2010
- Surveillant - 2012
- Planche à l'oeil - 2012
- Acrobat - 2012
- Mi nina mi vida - 2014
- Turn Off Before Living - 2014
- W-A-L-K - 2015
- Chelem - 2015
- Envers et contre nous - 2015
- Tout simplement - 2016
- Pre-Drink - 2017
- A Touch of Spring (Un printemps d'ailleurs) - 2017
- Lost Paradise Lost - 2017
- Fauve - 2018
- The Colour of Your Lips (La couleur de tes lèvres) - 2018
- Brotherhood (Ikhwène) - 2018
- The Worm - 2018
- Tibbits Hill - 2021
- Who Do I Belong To - 2024
- Hunting Daze (Jour de chasse) - 2024
- Where the River Begins (Donde comenzia el rio) - 2026

=== Director ===
- Nowhere Elsewhere (Au milieu de nulle part ailleurs) - 2010
- Turn Off Before Living - 2014
- The Colour of Your Lips (La couleur de tes lèvres) - 2018
- Hunting Daze (Jour de chasse) - 2024
