= Gods, Weeds and Revolutions =

- Directed by: Meryam Joobeur
- Written by: Meryam Joobeur
- Produced by: Meryam Joobeur
- Starring: Meryam Joobeur
- Cinematography: Vincent Gonneville
- Edited by: Meryam Joobeur; Dominique Loubier
- Music by: Amelia Ann Landreville
- Release date: 2012
- Running time: 20 minutes
- Country: Canada
- Languages: English; Arabic

Gods, Weeds and Revolutions is a Canadian short documentary film, directed by Meryam Joobeur and released in 2012. The film documents Joobeur's own trip home to her native Tunisia, where she confronts her grandfather's terminal illness and the country's dark past under dictatorship.

It was the winner of the Métro prize for Best Student Film at the 2013 Rendez-vous du cinéma québécois, and the Colin Low Award for Best Canadian Documentary at the 2013 DOXA Documentary Film Festival.
