= Four Daughters (2023 film) =

2023 documentary film by Kaouther Ben Hania

- French theatrical release poster
- Arabic: بنات ألفة
- French: Les Filles d'Olfa
- Directed by: Kaouther Ben Hania
- Written by: Kaouther Ben Hania
- Produced by: Nadim Cheikhrouha; Habib Attia; Thanassis Karathanos; Martin Hampel
- Cinematography: Farouk Laaridh
- Edited by: Kaouther Ben Hania; Qutaiba Barhamji; Jean-Christophe Hym
- Music by: Amine Bouhafa
- Production companies: Tanit Films; Cinétéléfilms; Twenty Twenty Vision Filmproduktion GmbH; Red Sea Film Festival Foundation; ZDF/ARTE; Jour2Fête
- Distributed by: Jour2Fête
- Release dates: 19 May 2023 (Cannes); 5 July 2023 (France); 20 September 2023 (Tunisia)
- Running time: 107 minutes
- Countries: France; Germany; Tunisia; Saudi Arabia
- Language: Arabic
- Box office: $1.2 million

Four Daughters (Arabic: بنات ألفة, romanized: Banāt Olfa, French: Les Filles d'Olfa, lit. 'Olfa's Daughters') is a 2023 Arabic-language documentary film directed by Kaouther Ben Hania. The film tells the story of a Tunisian family after two of four daughters leave to join Daesh fighters in Libya. The filmmaker invites professional actors to stand in for the missing daughters and others in the retelling of the story. The film is an international co-production between France, Tunisia, Germany, and Saudi Arabia.

The film competed for the Palme d'Or at the 76th Cannes Film Festival, where it had its world premiere on 19 May 2023. It was released in France on 5 July 2023. It was selected as the Tunisian entry for the Best International Feature Film at the 96th Academy Awards and was nominated for Best Documentary Feature.

== Premise ==
Olfa is the mother of four daughters in Tunisia. Her two older daughters, after becoming radicalised, leave the family to join Daesh fighters in Libya - first one, then the other. Director Kaouther Ben Hania uses professional actors to bring the viewer closer to the life stories of Olfa and her daughters. The film features Olfa and her two remaining daughters, who retell the story along with the actors standing in for the sisters and the various men in their lives.

== Cast ==
- Hend Sabri as Olfa
- Olfa Hamrouni
- Eya Chikhaoui
- Tayssir Chikhaoui
- Nour Karoui as Rahma Chikhaoui
- Ichraq Matar as Ghofrane Chikhaoui
- Majd Mastoura

== Background ==
Tunisian Olfa Hamrouni rose to international prominence in April 2016 when she publicized the radicalization of her two teenage daughters, Rahma and Ghofrane Chikhaoui. Both teenagers had left Tunisia to fight alongside the Islamic State (IS) in Libya. Hamrouni publicly criticized the Tunisian authorities for not preventing her daughter Rahma from leaving the country. After the arrest of the two women by Libyan forces, the authorities again did not react. Hamrouni is also said to have been prevented from leaving the country in order to look for her daughters in Libya on her own.

== Production ==
Four Daughters is written and directed by Kaouther Ben Hania. Cinematography is by Farouk Laaridh, and the film is edited by Kaouther Ben Hania, Qutaiba Barhamji, and Jean-Christophe Hym. Amine Bouhafa composed the score.

The film is produced by Nadim Cheikhrouha at Paris-based Tanit Films; Habib Attia at Tunis-based Cinétéléfilms; Thanassis Karathanos and Martin Hampel at Berlin-based Twenty Twenty Vision Filmproduktion GmbH; and co-produced by Red Sea Film Festival Foundation, ZDF/Arte, and Jour2Fête.

== Release ==
Four Daughters was selected to compete for the Palme d'Or at the 2023 Cannes Film Festival, where it had its world premiere on 19 May 2023. This is the second participation of a Tunisian production in the Cannes main competition since Abdellatif Ben Ammar's feature film A Simple Story in 1970. The film was theatrically released in France by Jour2Fête on 5 July 2023. It was released in Tunisia on 20 September 2023 by Hakka Distribution. It was also invited at the 28th Busan International Film Festival in 'Documentary Showcase' section and will be screened in October 2023.

Kino Lorber gave the film a limited theatrical release in the United States on 27 October 2023.

== Reception ==
=== Critical response ===
On Rotten Tomatoes, the film holds an approval rating of 96% based on 82 reviews, with an average rating of 8.1/10. The site's critics consensus reads: "Four Daughters' unique approach to documenting real-life horror is a formal gamble that only underscores the bravery and resilience of its subjects." On Metacritic, the film has a weighted average score of 80 out of 100, based on 21 critic reviews, indicating "generally favorable" reviews. Four Daughters received an average rating of 3.7 out of 5 stars on the French website AlloCiné, based on 28 reviews.

=== Accolades ===
Award	Date of ceremony	Category	Recipient(s)	Result	Ref.
Academy Awards	10 March 2024	Best Documentary Feature Film	Kaouther Ben Hania and Nadim Cheikhrouha	Nominated	
Alliance of Women Film Journalists	3 January 2024	Best Documentary	Four Daughters	Nominated	
Austin Film Critics Association Awards	10 January 2024	Best Documentary	Four Daughters	Nominated	
Brussels International Film Festival	5 July 2023	Grand Prix - International Competition	Four Daughters	Nominated	
Brussels International Film Festival	5 July 2023	International Competition - Jury Prize	Four Daughters	Won	
Calgary International Film Festival	1 October 2023	Best International Documentary Feature	Four Daughters	Nominated	
Cannes Film Festival	27 May 2023	Palme d'Or	Kaouther Ben Hania	Nominated	
Cannes Film Festival	27 May 2023	L'Œil d'or (Note: Shared with The Mother of All Lies.)	Kaouther Ben Hania	Won	
Cannes Film Festival	27 May 2023	François Chalais Prize	Kaouther Ben Hania	Won	
Cannes Film Festival	27 May 2023	Prix de la Citoyenneté	Kaouther Ben Hania	Won	
César Awards	23 February 2024	Best Documentary Film	Nadim Cheikhrouha, Habib Attia, Thanassis Karathanos, Martin Hampel, Kaouther Ben Hania	Won	
Chicago International Film Festival	22 October 2023	Best International Documentary	Four Daughters	Nominated	
Chicago International Film Festival	22 October 2023	Best International Documentary - Special Mention	Four Daughters	Won	
Cinema for Peace Dove	February 19 2024	Women's Empowerment	Four Daughters	Won	
Cinema Eye Honors	12 January 2024	Outstanding Non-Fiction Feature	Kaouther Ben Hania, Nadim Cheikhrouha	Nominated	
Cinema Eye Honors	12 January 2024	Outstanding Direction	Kaouther Ben Hania	Won	
Cinema Eye Honors	12 January 2024	Heterodox Award	Four Daughters	Nominated	
European Film Awards	9 December 2023	Best European Documentary	Four Daughters	Nominated	
Festival international du cinéma francophone en Acadie	24 November 2023	Best Medium or Feature Documentary	Kaouther Ben Hania	Won	
Georgia Film Critics Association Awards	5 January 2024	Best Documentary Film	Four Daughters	Nominated	
Gotham Independent Film Awards	27 November 2023	Best Documentary Feature	Four Daughters	Won	
IDA Documentary Awards	12 December 2023	Best Writing	Kaouther Ben Hania	Won	
Independent Spirit Awards	25 February 2024	Best Documentary Feature	Kaouther Ben Hania, Nadim Cheikhrouha	Won	
IndieWire Critics Poll	11 December 2023	Best Documentary	Four Daughters	5th Place (Note: Tied with The Eternal Memory.)	
Lumière Awards	22 January 2024	Best Music	Amine Bouhafa	Nominated	
Lumière Awards	22 January 2024	Best Documentary	Four Daughters	Won	
Montclair Film Festival	29 October 2023	Bruce Sinofsky Prize for Documentary Feature	Four Daughters	Won	
Munich Film Festival	1 July 2023	ARRI/OSRAM Award for Best Film	Kaouther Ben Hania	Won	
Paris Film Critics Association Awards	4 February 2024	Best Documentary	Kaouther Ben Hania	Won	
Toronto Film Critics Association	17 December 2023	Allan King Documentary Award	Four Daughters	Runner-up (Note: Shared with The Eternal Memory and Swan Song.)	
Valladolid International Film Festival	28 October 2023	Golden Spike	Four Daughters	Nominated	
Women Film Critics Circle Awards	18 December 2023	Best Foreign Film by or About Women	Four Daughters	Runner-up	

== See also ==
- List of submissions to the 96th Academy Awards for Best International Feature Film
- List of Tunisian submissions for the Academy Award for Best International Feature Film
