= The Colour of Your Lips =

The Colour of Your Lips 2
- Film poster
- French: La couleur de tes lèvres
- Directed by: Annick Blanc
- Written by: Annick Blanc
- Produced by: Maria Gracia Turgeon
- Starring: Alexis Lefebvre; Katia Lévesque
- Cinematography: Derek Branscombe
- Edited by: David Valiquette
- Music by: Marie-Hélène Delorme
- Release date: 2018
- Running time: 18 minutes
- Country: Canada

The Colour of Your Lips (French: La couleur de tes lèvres) is a Canadian short drama film, directed by Annick Blanc and released in 2018. The film stars Alexis Lefebvre and Katia Lévesque as a man and a woman who appear to be the last remaining survivors of a post-apocalyptic world where the atmosphere no longer supports human life.

At the 7th Canadian Screen Awards in 2019, the film was shortlisted for Best Live Action Short Drama.
