= The Daughter of Keltoum =

The Daughter of Keltoum (La Fille de Keltoum) is a 2002 drama film about a 19-year-old from the Maghreb, Rallia, who is brought up in a foster family in Switzerland, and who goes back to her village to find her mother, Keltoum. While waiting for her mother in an isolated house, Raillia meets her grandfather and aunt and learns about the life and people in her village. It is directed by Mahdi Charef and stars Cylia Malki, Baya Belal, Jean-Roger Milo, Fatima Ben Saidane, and Deborah Lamy.
