= Casbah City =

2017 Algerian television series

- Original logotype of the series
- القصبة
- Genre: Comedy
- Written by: Yanis Kousim; Nabil Asli
- Directed by: Issam Bouguerra
- Starring: Souad Sebki; Mourad Saouli Idir Benaibouche; Mohamed Boucheyeb; Arkam Slama; Mounia Ben Fighoul; Shirine Boutella
- Country of origin: Algeria
- Original language: Arabic
- No. of seasons: 1
- No. of episodes: 26

Production
- Production location: Casbah of Algiers
- Camera setup: Multiple
- Production company: Not Found Prod

Original release
- Network: El Djazairia One
- Release: 27 May – 22 June 2017

Casbah City (Arabic: القصبة سيتي) is an Algerian comedy television series, directed by Issam Bouguerra. It debuted on 27 May 2017 on El Djazairia One.

== Overview ==
The series revolves around the diary of neighbours living in the popular casbah neighbourhood, and what happens inside. Some of the quarrels between neighbours and those who challenge each other in times of crisis appear.

== Cast ==
Actor/Actress	Character
Souad Sebki	Awawech
Mourad Saouli	Badidou
Mohamed Boucheyeb	Faycal
Arkam Slama	Khaled
Mounia Ben Fighoul	Zaphira
Shirine Boutella	Jo/Joher
Ahcene Bachar	The server
Idir Benaibouche	Bikam
