= The Man Who Sold His Skin =

2020 film by Kaouther Ben Hania

- Theatrical release poster
- Directed by: Kaouther Ben Hania
- Screenplay by: Kaouther Ben Hania
- Based on: Tim by Wim Delvoye; Skin by Roald Dahl
- Produced by: Habib Attia; Nadim Cheikhrouha; Martin Hampel; Thanassis Karathanos; Annabella Nezri; Andreas Rocksén
- Starring: Yahya Mahayni; Dea Liane; Koen De Bouw; Monica Bellucci
- Cinematography: Christopher Aoun
- Edited by: Marie-Hélène Dozo
- Music by: Amine Bouhafa
- Production companies: Cinétéléfilms; Tanit Films; Twenty Twenty Vision; Kwassa Films; Laika Film & Television; Metafora Media Production; Sunnyland Film; Film i Väst; VOO; BeTV; Istiqlal Films
- Distributed by: Hakka Distribution (Tunisia); BAC Films (France); Cinéart (Belgium); eksystent Filmverleih (Germany); Folkets Bio (Sweden); Bir Film (Turkey)
- Release date: 4 September 2020 (Venice)
- Running time: 104 minutes
- Countries: Tunisia; France; Germany; Belgium; Sweden; Turkey; Cyprus
- Languages: Arabic; English; French

The Man Who Sold His Skin (Arabic: الرجل الذي باع ظهره, romanized: ar-rajul allaḏī bāʿa ẓahrahu, lit. 'The Man Who Sold His Back') is a 2020 internationally co-produced drama film directed by Kaouther Ben Hania. Its plot was inspired by Belgian contemporary artist Wim Delvoye's living work Tim (2006), which was in turn inspired by Roald Dahl's 1952 short story "Skin". It was selected as the Tunisian entry for the Best International Feature Film at the 93rd Academy Awards, making the shortlist of fifteen films. In March 2021, it was nominated for the Best International Feature Film.

It premiered in the Horizons section at the 77th Venice International Film Festival, where Yahya Mahayni won the Best Actor Award.

== Premise ==
Raqqa fiances Sam and Abeer are separated by the Syrian Civil War. While Sam seeks refuge in Lebanon, Abeer's family forces her to marry a richer man and move with him to Brussels. In the desperate pursuit of money and the needed paperwork to travel to Europe to rescue her, Sam accepts to have his back tattooed as a Schengen visa by one of the most controversial contemporary artists in the West. His own body turned into a living work of art and promptly exhibited in a museum. Sam will soon realize he has sold away more than just his skin.

== Cast ==
- Yahya Mahayni as Sam Ali
- Dea Liane as Abeer
- Koen De Bouw as Jeffrey Godefroi, the controversial artist
- Monica Bellucci as Soraya Waldy, an art dealer
- Saad Lostan as Ziad, Abeer's husband
- Darina Al Joundi as Sam's mother
- Jan Dahdouh as Hazem
- Christian Vadim as William
- Wim Delvoye as an insurance broker

== Reception ==
=== Critical response ===
The Man Who Sold His Skin has an approval rating of 88% based on 52 professional reviews on the review aggregator website Rotten Tomatoes, with an average rating of 7.2/10. The site's critical consensus reads, "The Man Who Sold His Skin uses the tension between art and commerce as powerful fuel for a sobering story about freedom and human dignity." On Metacritic, the film has a score of 64 based on 16 critics, indicating "generally favorable" reviews.

=== Accolades ===
Award	Date of ceremony	Category	Recipient(s)	Result	Ref(s)
Academy Awards	25 April 2021	Best International Feature Film	Kaouther Ben Hania	Nominated	
Magritte Awards	12 February 2022	Best Foreign Film	Kaouther Ben Hania	Nominated	
Stockholm International Film Festival	19 November 2020	Bronze Horse	Kaouther Ben Hania	Nominated	
Stockholm International Film Festival	19 November 2020	Best Screenplay	Kaouther Ben Hania	Won	
Venice International Film Festival	12 September 2020	Best Film (Horizons section)	The Man Who Sold His Skin	Nominated	
Venice International Film Festival	12 September 2020	Best Actor (Horizons section)	Yahya Mahayni	Won	

== See also ==
- List of submissions to the 93rd Academy Awards for Best International Feature Film
- List of Tunisian submissions for the Academy Award for Best International Feature Film
