= Mimetic (disambiguation) =

"Mimetic" is the quality of exhibiting mimesis.

It may also refer to:

- Memetics
- Mimetic theory

== See also ==
- Mimesis (disambiguation)
- Mimetic muscles
- Mimetic words
- Caloric restriction mimetic, a substance that mimics some effects of dietary restrictions
- Exercise mimetic, a substance that mimics some effects of physical exercise
