= List of submissions to the 68th Academy Awards for Best Foreign Language Film =

1995 Best Foreign Language Film submissions
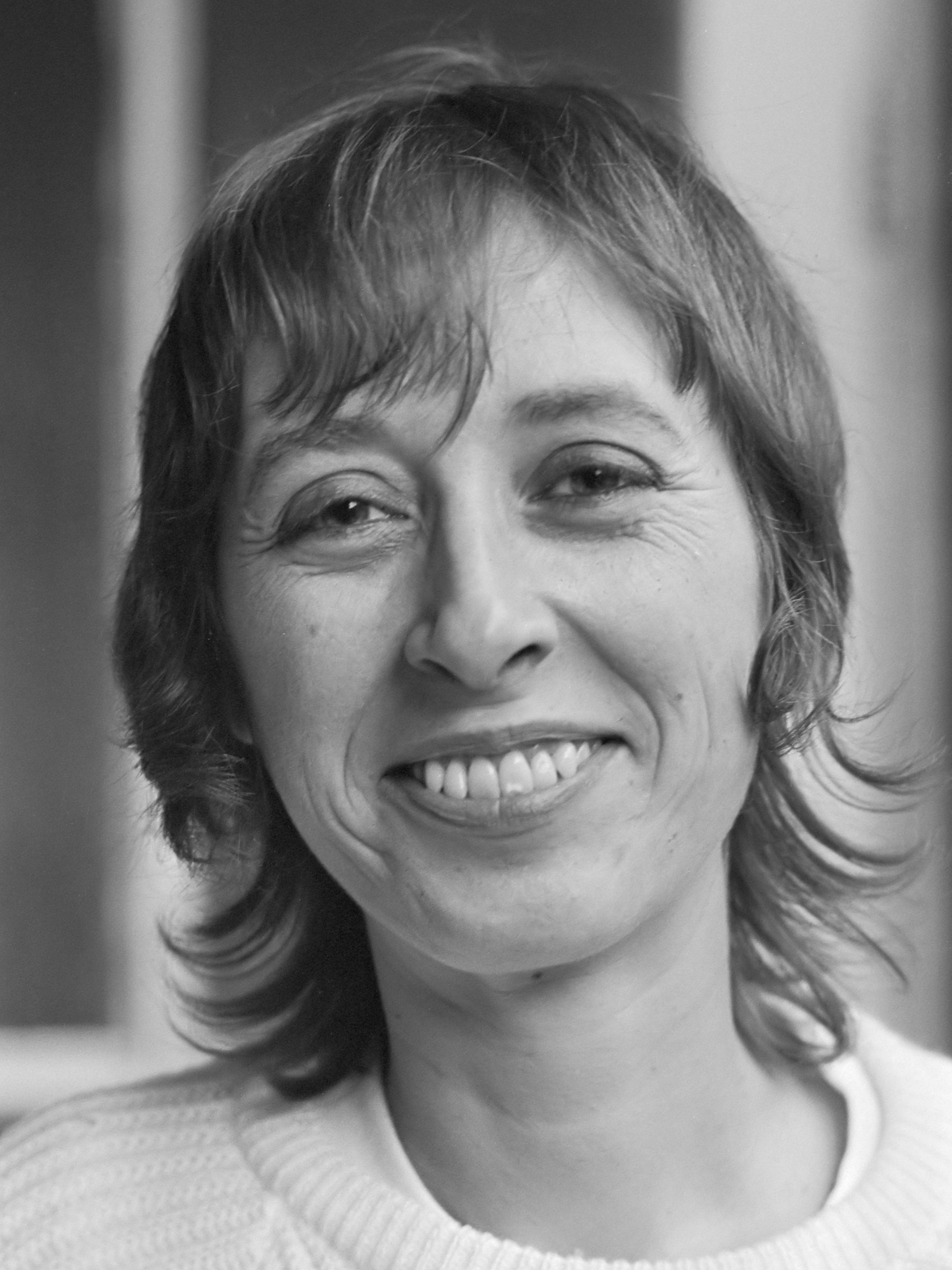
- Marleen Gorris directed Antonia's Line, which won the year's award.

Highlights
- Oscar winner: (Netherlands) Antonia's Line
- Submissions: 41
- Debuts: 2

This is a list of submissions to the 68th Academy Awards for the Best Foreign Language Film. The Academy of Motion Picture Arts and Sciences (AMPAS) has invited the film industries of various countries to submit their best film for the Academy Award for Best Foreign Language Film every year since the award was created in 1956. The award is presented annually by the Academy to a feature-length motion picture produced outside the United States that contains primarily non-English dialogue. The Foreign Language Film Award Committee oversees the process and reviews all the submitted films.

For the 68th Academy Awards, the submitted motion pictures must have first been released theatrically in their respective countries between 1 November 1994 and 31 October 1995. The deadline for submissions to the Academy was 1 November 1995. 41 countries submitted films and were found to be eligible by AMPAS and screened for voters. Bolivia and Tunisia submitted films for the first time. The five nominees were announced on 13 February 1996.

The Netherlands won the award for the second time with Antonia's Line by Marleen Gorris.

== Submissions ==
| Submitting country | Film title used in nomination | Original title | Language(s) | Director(s) | Result |
|---|---|---|---|---|---|
| Algeria | Dust of Life | Poussières de vie | French, Vietnamese | Rachid Bouchareb | Nominated |
| Argentina | Wild Horses | Caballos salvajes | Spanish | Marcelo Piñeyro | Not nominated |
| Austria | Ant Street | Die Ameisenstraße | Viennese German, Polish | Michael Glawogger | Not nominated |
| Belgium | Mannekin Pis | | Dutch, Flemish | Frank Van Passel | Not nominated |
| Bolivia | Jonah and the Pink Whale | Jonás y la ballena rosada | Spanish | Juan Carlos Valdivia | Not nominated |
| Brazil | The Quartet | O Quatrilho | Brazilian Portuguese, Talian Venetian | Fábio Barreto | Nominated |
| Canada | The Confessional | Le confessionnal | French, English | Robert Lepage | Not nominated |
| China | Red Cherry | 红樱桃 | Mandarin, Russian, German | Ye Daying | Not nominated |
| Croatia | Washed Out | Isprani | Croatian | Zrinko Ogresta | Not nominated |
| Czech Republic | Thanks for Every New Morning | Díky za kazdé nové ráno | Czech, Ukrainian, Hebrew, Carpathian Rusyn | Milan Šteindler | Not nominated |
| Dominican Republic | Nueba Yol | Nueba Yol: por fin llegó Balbuena | Spanish, Pulaar, English | Ángel Muñiz | Not nominated |
| Finland | The Last Wedding | Kivenpyörittäjän kylä | North Karelia Savo Finnish | Markku Pölönen | Not nominated |
| France | French Twist | Gazon maudit | French, Spanish | Josiane Balasko | Not nominated |
| Germany | Brother of Sleep | Schlafes Bruder | Vorarlbergerisch | Joseph Vilsmaier | Not nominated |
| Greece | Ulysses' Gaze | Το Βλέμμα του Οδυσσέα | Greek, English, Bulgarian, Albanian, Serbian, Romanian, Northern Kurdish, Macedonian, German | Theo Angelopoulos | Not nominated |
| Hong Kong | Summer Snow | 女人，四十 | Cantonese, Mandarin | Ann Hui | Not nominated |
| Hungary | The Outpost | A részleg | Hungarian, Romanian | Péter Gothár | Not nominated |
| Iceland | Tears of Stone | Tár úr steini | Icelandic, German | Hilmar Oddsson | Not nominated |
| India | Kuruthipunal | குருதிபுனல் | Tamil, Telugu | P. C. Sreeram | Not nominated |
| Iran | The White Balloon | بادکنک سفيد | Persian | Jafar Panahi | Not nominated |
| Israel | Lovesick on Nana Street | חולה אהבה בשיכון גימל | Hebrew | Savi Gabizon | Not nominated |
| Italy | The Star Maker | L'uomo delle stelle | Italian, Sicilian | Giuseppe Tornatore | Nominated |
| Japan | Deep River | 深い河 | Japanese, English, Hindi | Kei Kumai | Not nominated |
| Mexico | Midaq Alley | El callejón de los milagros | Spanish | Jorge Fons | Not nominated |
| Netherlands | Antonia's Line | Antonia | Dutch | Marleen Gorris | Won Academy Award |
| Norway | Kristin Lavransdatter | | Norwegian | Liv Ullmann | Not nominated |
| Philippines | Harvest Home | Inagaw Mo Ang Lahat Sa Akin | Filipino | Carlos Siguion-Reyna | Not nominated |
| Poland | Crows | Wrony | Polish | Dorota Kędzierzawska | Not nominated |
| Portugal | God's Comedy | A Comédia de Deus | Portuguese | João César Monteiro | Not nominated |
| Russia | A Moslem | Мусульманин | Russian, Arabic | Vladimir Khotinenko | Not nominated |
| Slovakia | The Garden | Záhrada | Slovak | Martin Šulík | Not nominated |
| South Korea | 301, 302 | 삼공일, 삼공이 | Korean | Park Chul-soo | Not nominated |
| Spain | The Flower of My Secret | La flor de mi secreto | Spanish, French | Pedro Almodóvar | Not nominated |
| Sweden | All Things Fair | Lust och fägring stor | Swedish, Scanian, German, English | Bo Widerberg | Nominated |
| Switzerland | Adultery: A User's Guide | Adultère, mode d'emploi | French, Arabic, English, Italian | Christine Pascal | Not nominated |
| Taiwan | Super Citizen Ko | 超級大國民 | Taiwanese Hokkien, Mandarin, Japanese | Wan Jen | Not nominated |
| Thailand | Once Upon a Time...This Morning | กาลครั้งหนึ่ง เมื่อเช้านี้ | Thai | Bhandit Rittakol | Not nominated |
| Tunisia | The Magic | Le magique / السحر | French, Arabic | Azdine Melliti | Not nominated |
| United Kingdom | Branwen | | Welsh, English, Irish | Ceri Sherlock | Not nominated |
| Venezuela | Sicario | | Spanish | José Ramón Novoa | Not nominated |
| FR Yugoslavia | Underground | Подземље | Serbian, German, English, French, Russian | Emir Kusturica | Not nominated |

== Notes ==
- Iran submitted The White Balloon by Jafar Panahi, but it unsuccessfully tried to withdraw their film entry from contention in protest over an alleged decision of the federal government of the United States to support a $20 million covert plan against the government of Iran. The Academy refused to accept the withdrawal.
