= El Djazairia One =

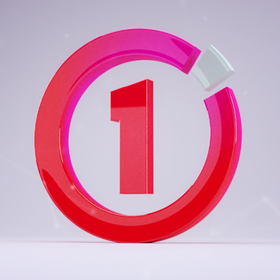
- Country: Algeria
- Broadcast area: Europe, Africa, Middle-East and Worldwide
- Network: El Djazairia
- Headquarters: Parcelle No. 13 Paradou Hydra, Algiers, Algeria

Programming
- Language(s): Arabic
- Picture format: 4:3 (576i, SDTV)

Ownership
- Owner: Ayoub Aissiou

History
- Launched: March 1, 2012
- Closed: August 23, 2021

Links
- Website: Official website

El Djazairia One (Arabic: الجزائرية وان) formerly El Djazairia Tv (March 1, 2012 – August 23, 2021) was an Arabic language satellite television channel broadcasting from Hydra, Algeria. El Djazairia was set up by Yousef Qasim with a number of Arab intellectuals from Algeria and the Arab World.

On 23 August 2021, The Algerian Broadcasting Regulatory Authority announced the "immediate and definitive" closure of the channel "El Djazairia One" for "failure to uphold the requirements of public order" and other reasons relating to the legal proceedings against the TV channel's founders and managers.

== Programming ==
=== News and current affairs ===
- ALG El Djazairia News (الجزائرية نيوز; 2012–2016)
- ALG News (الأخبار; 2016)
- ALG Top Stories (الموجز; 2016)
- ALG Weather (الأحوال الجوية; 2012)
- ALG Weather in Beaches (طقس الشواطئ; 2016)
- ALG The Ramadan Journal (النشرة الرمضانية; 2016)

=== Lifestyle and variety shows ===
- ALG The Algerians (الجزائريات)
- ALG The Art of Cooking (فن الطياب)
- ALG Be a Man! (كونك راجل)
- ALG Change the Look, They'll Love You! (بدل اللوك يحبوك)
- ALG Coffee Milk Party (قهوة حليب بارتي)
- ALG The Comprehension (الفهامة)
- ALG Dzeriet Mag TV (دزيريات ماڨ تيفي; 2010)
- ALG El Djazairia Summer 2016 (صيف الجزائرية 2016; 2016)
- ALG El Gusto Cafe (قهوة الڨوسطو)
- ALG El Gusto Journal (جرنان الڨوسطو)
- ALG Entertainment with Baaziz (ڨسرة مع بعزيز; 2016)
- FRA How It's Made (Comment c'est fait 2016)
- ALG Live Artists (فنانين لايف)
- ALG Our Algeria (دزايرنا)
- ALG Pano Cine (Pano Ciné 2016)
- ALG With Zahra (مع زهرة)
- ALG A World of Health (عالم الصحة; 2016)
- ALG Health and Advice (صحّة و نصيحة; 2017)
- ALG El Djazairia Show (الجزائريّة شو; 2017)
- ALG Hashtag Mag (2018; هاشتاج)

=== Religious series ===
- MENA Flashs (خواطر; 2017)
- ALG Moralities and Values (الأخلاق و القيم; 2016)
- ALG Story of an Ayah (قصة آية; 2016)

=== Dramas and comedies ===
- ALG Casbah City (القصبة سيتي; 2017)
- ALG The Brothers (الخاوة; 2017)
- ALG Bouzid Days (بوزيد دايز; 2016)
- KOR The King of Legend (صراع الملوك; 2017)
- ALG Scrupulous (موسوسين; 2016)
- MENA Omar (عمر; 2016)

=== Animated series ===
- KOR Challenge of Strongs (تحدي الأقوياء; 2016)
- MENA Stories of Ayat in Quran (قصص الآيات في القرآن; 2016)

== Brand identity ==
Evolution of El Djazairia One logo

2016 – May 17, 2017

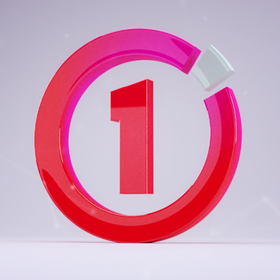
May 17, 2017 – August 23, 2021
