= Rim Riahi =

Tunisian actress

Rim Riahi ريم الرياحي
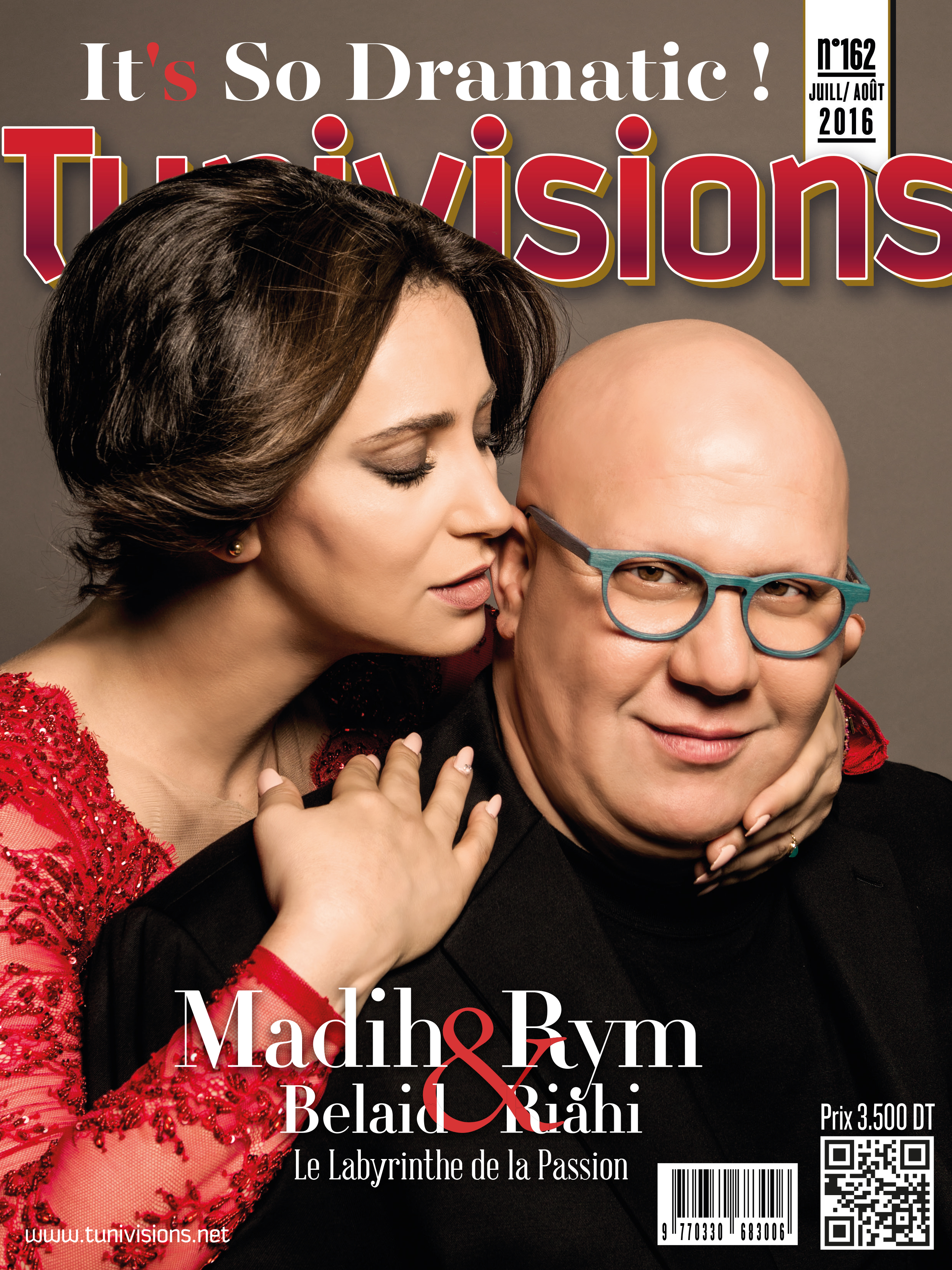
- Rim Riahi and her husband on the August 2016 cover of Tunivisions
- Born: Rim Riahi; 17 February 1977 (age 49); Tunisia
- Occupation: Actress
- Years active: 1990–present
- Spouse: Madih Belaïd

Rim Riahi (born 17 February 1970) is a Tunisian actor. She is best known for the role "Hanène Lahmar" in the television serial Naouret El Hawa.

== Personal life ==
She was born on 17 February 1977 in Tunisia. She was married to Tunisian director Madih Belaïd where the couple has three children.

== Career ==
In 1997 she started acting career with the television serial El Khottab Al Bab in which she played the role "Raoudha". With the success of the serial, she was selected for the 1998 film Moon Wedding directed by Taïeb Louhichi. Then in 1999, she appeared in the television serial Ghalia directed by Moncef El Kateb.

At the beginning of new millennium, she received a lead role in the television screen, where she played the role "Lilia Mardoum-Srairi" in the popular television serial Gamret Sidi Mahrous directed by Slaheddine Essid in 2002. In 2006, she played the role of "Zohra" in Mohamed Ghodhbane's serial Hayet Wa Amani.

In 2014, she starred in the television serial Naouret El Hawa, directed by her husband Belaïd. The series became very popular and she received the award for Best Actress for her role as "Hanène Lahmar" in the serial Naouret El Hawa in that year. She won the Ramadan Star Award at the Romdhane Awards awarded by Mosaïque FM.

== Filmography ==
=== Cinema ===
- 1998 : Moon Wedding, by Taïeb Louhichi
- 2006 : Ellombara, by Ali Abidi
- 2010 : The Last Hour, by Ali Abidi

=== Television serials ===
- 1997 : El Khottab Al Bab (Suitors are on the door) (season 2), by Slaheddine Essid : Raoudha
- 1999 : Ghalia (Precious), by Moncef El Kateb
- 2002 : Gamret Sidi Mahrous (The Moon of Master Mahrus), by Slaheddine Essid : Lilia Mardum Srairi
- 2005 : Mal Wa Amal (Money and Hopes), by Abdelkader Jerbi
- 2006 : Hayet Wa Amani (Life and Wishes), by Mohamed Ghodhbane : Zohra
- 2010 : Njoum Ellil (Night Stars) (season 2), by Madih Belaid : Hanen Lahmar
- 2014–2015 : Naouret El Hawa (Air Waterwheel), by Madih Belaid
- 2016 : Al Akaber (The Great Ones), by Madih Belaid
- 2020 : Nouba (Season 2) by Abdelhamid Bouchnak : Najwa
- 2021 : Machair (Feelings) by Muhammet Gök : Rym
- 2022 : Baraa (Innocence) by Mourad Ben Cheikh and Sami Fehri : Zohra
- 2023-2024 : Fallujah, by Saoussen Jemni : Dalila
- 2025 : Fetna (strife) by Saoussen Jemni : Malika
- 2026 : El Khottifa (The Swallow Bird, Arabic: الخطّيفة), by Saoussen Jemni : Asya
