= Hichem Yacoubi =

Tunisian actor

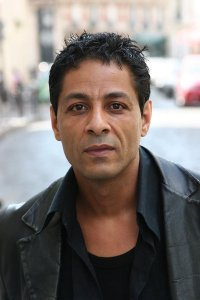
- Born: 4 April 1964 (age 60); Tunis, Tunisia
- Citizenship: French
- Occupation: Actor
- Years active: 2005-present

Hichem Yacoubi (born 4 April 1964 in Tunis, Tunisia) is a Tunisian-born French actor who had a role in the film A Prophet (in French Un prophète) (2009) directed by Jacques Audiard. He studied theater (including a course at the Actors Studio) and dance. He has appeared in several films including a short film which he co-directed and co-wrote the screenplay with Daniel Kupferstein.

== A Prophet (Un prophète) (2009) ==
Yacoubi's most recent role was as an incarcerated Arab named Reyeb who was a witness to a crime. He is a hostile witness, willing to testify against the Corsican mafia group which is led by a fellow inmate, César Luciani (Niels Arestrup). Luciani, having no direct access to his target, enlists the movies lead character, Malik El Djebani, to kill Reyeb. Though the character is killed early on, he appears throughout most of the film as a manifestation of Malik's conscience.

== Happy Birthday (Bon Anniversaire) (2007) ==
Yacoubi and Daniel Kupferstein co-directed Bon Anniversaire (Happy Birthday), a 2007 short film. He submitted the short documentary piece in 2008 to the 18° Festival del Cinema Africano, d'Asia e America Latina, which features films in Italy by African, Asian, and Latin American individuals.

== Selected filmography ==
=== Film ===
Year	Title	Role	Notes
2005	Munich	Arab Guard #3	Produced and directed by Steven Spielberg
2006	L'Equilibre de la terreur		Directed by Jean-Martial Lefranc
2006	Azur & Asmar: The Princes' Quest	(voice)	Animated film directed by Michel Ocelot
2007	Happy Birthday		Short film directed by Yacoubi and Daniel Kupferstein; French title: Bon Anniversaire
2009	A Prophet	Reyeb	
2019	Arab Blues	Raouf	
2022	Speak No Evil	Muhajid	
