= Where the River Begins =

2026 drama film

- Promotional poster
- Spanish: Donde comenzia el rio
- Directed by: Juan Andrés Arango
- Written by: Juan Andrés Arango
- Produced by: Annick Blanc; Maria Gracia Turgeon; Paola Andrea Pérez Nieto
- Starring: Girleza Duave Cerezo; Ana Michell Nama Dumaza; Juan David Junca Linares
- Cinematography: Nicolas Canniccioni
- Edited by: Xi Feng
- Music by: Frannie Holder
- Production companies: Midi La Nuit; Inercia Películas
- Distributed by: h264
- Release date: 14 September 2026 (TIFF)
- Running time: 102 minutes
- Countries: Colombia; Canada; Norway
- Languages: Spanish; Emberá

Where the River Begins (Spanish: Donde comenzia el rio) is a drama film, directed by Juan Andrés Arango and released in 2026. A coproduction of companies from Colombia, Canada and Norway, the film stars Girleza Duave Cerezo as Yajaira, an Emberá woman who flees her home in Bogotá to escape the city's crime and violence, setting off on a journey to her former home up the Andágueda River with her daughter Maria (Ana Michell Nama Dumaza) and Jhon (Juan David Junca Linares), a teenage gang member who also wishes to escape his circumstances.

Arango cast non-professional actors in the film, which was shot in Colombia in 2025. The film premiered in the Centrepiece program at the 2026 Toronto International Film Festival.
