= Hunting Daze =

2024 Canadian thriller drama film by Annick Blanc

- French: Jour de chasse
- Directed by: Annick Blanc
- Written by: Annick Blanc
- Produced by: Annick Blanc; Maria Gracia Turgeon
- Starring: Nahéma Ricci; Marc Beaupré; Maxime Genois; Alexandre Landry
- Cinematography: Vincent Gonneville
- Edited by: Amélie Labrèche
- Music by: Peter Venne
- Production company: Midi La Nuit
- Distributed by: Maison 4:3
- Release date: March 9, 2024 (SXSW)
- Running time: 79 minutes
- Country: Canada
- Language: Quebec French

Hunting Daze (French: Jour de chasse) is a Canadian thriller drama film, directed by Annick Blanc and released in 2024. The film stars Nahéma Ricci as Nina, a sex worker who is left stranded by her boss after a gig performing at a men's hunting weekend, and begins to bond as "one of the boys" with the hunters until the group's equilibrium is upset by the arrival of another outsider.

The cast also includes Marc Beaupré, Maxime Genois, Alexandre Landry, Bruno Marcil, Frédéric Millaire-Zouvi and Noubi Ndiaye.

== Release ==
The film premiered on March 9, 2024, at the SXSW festival. It had its Canadian premiere at the 28th Fantasia International Film Festival on August 1, 2024, prior to its commercial premiere on August 16.

== Awards ==
Award	Date of ceremony	Category	Recipient(s)	Result	Ref.
Fantasia International Film Festival	2024	Audience Award, Canadian Films	Annick Blanc	Runner-up	
Prix Iris	December 8, 2024	Best Actress	Nahéma Ricci	Nominated	
Prix Iris	December 8, 2024	Best Cinematography	Vincent Gonneville	Nominated	
Prix Iris	December 8, 2024	Best Sound	Samuel Gagnon-Thibodeau, Luc Boudrias, Laurent Ouellette	Nominated	
Prix Iris	December 8, 2024	Best Visual Effects	Julia Aubry, Evren Boisjoli, Ricardo Santillana, René Allegretti	Nominated	
Prix Iris	December 8, 2024	Best First Film	Annick Blanc	Nominated	
