= The Voice of Hind Rajab =

2025 Tunisian drama film

- International promotional poster
- Original title: صوت هند رجب
- Directed by: Kaouther Ben Hania
- Written by: Kaouther Ben Hania
- Produced by: Nadim Cheikhrouha; Odessa Rae; James Wilson
- Starring: Saja Kilani; Motaz Malhees; Amer Hlehel; Clara Khoury
- Cinematography: Juan Sarmiento G.
- Edited by: Qutaiba Barhamji; Maxime Mathis; Kaouther Ben Hania
- Music by: Amine Bouhafa
- Production companies: Mime Films; Tanit Films
- Distributed by: Jour2Fête (France)
- Release dates: 3 September 2025 (Venice); 10 September 2025 (Tunisia); 26 November 2025 (France)
- Running time: 89 minutes
- Countries: Tunisia; France
- Language: Palestinian Arabic
- Box office: $6 million

The Voice of Hind Rajab (Arabic: صوت هند رجب, romanized: Ṣawt Hind Rajab) is a 2025 docudrama film written and directed by Kaouther Ben Hania. It follows the Red Crescent response during the killing of Hind Rajab, a five-year-old Palestinian girl, by the Israel Defense Forces during the Israeli invasion of the Gaza Strip. It stars Saja Kilani, Motaz Malhees, Amer Hlehel, and Clara Khoury. The film is a co-production between Tunisia and France.

The film had its world premiere in the main competition of the 82nd Venice International Film Festival on 3 September 2025, where it won the Grand Jury Prize and six other parallel prizes. It was theatrically released in Tunisia on 10 September, and was released in France on 26 November by Jour2Fête.

At the 98th Academy Awards, it was nominated for Best International Feature Film as the Tunisian entry. At the 83rd Golden Globe Awards, it was also nominated for Best Non-English Language Film.

== Synopsis ==
Omar is a volunteer working for the Palestinian Red Crescent who is new to the job and requires training and help from other more experienced workers. On January 29, 2024, they receive an emergency call from a girl who is being shot at near the Fares Gas Station in the Tel al-Hawa neighborhood in northern Gaza. The region was previously ordered to be evacuated by the Israeli occupation army. The line cuts before she can identify herself. Emotionally shell-shocked from the event, Omar is given a sticker with the icon of a person by his co-worker Rana to symbolize unnamed victims of the Gaza genocide who called them.

They are called by the uncle of that girl, living in Germany, who reveals a 6-year-old girl, Hind Rajab, is still alive, trapped in that same car under fire in Gaza. She is pleading for rescue and Omar calculates that an ambulance would take 8 minutes to reach her. He forwards this to his manager Mahdi who is in charge of coordinating safe routes for ambulances with the Palestine Red Cross. This is a difficult task as the Israeli army has jammed many of the phone lines in Gaza.

In order to buy time, Omar and Rana ask Hind questions about her family and her life before the war. She was travelling with her uncle and his family intending to evacuate the region. She reveals that the shelling has killed all the other occupants of the car; she initially describes as them "sleeping."

Omar storms into Mahdi's office and begins an outburst due to their inability to dispatch the ambulance. But Mahdi explains that he must follow protocol very closely (waiting for authorization, the approved route and the "green light" allowing the ambulance to actually go) as many humanitarian aid workers who went out without it were murdered by Israeli forces.

Hind reveals the presence of an armed tank near her family's car as Rana recites the Quran. They obtain the green light to allow the ambulance to pass but then the phone repeatedly cuts out and Rana thinks Hind has been killed. Omar draws time units on Mahdi's walls, calls Mahdi a coward and claims his kind of people are the reason Palestine is still occupied. Rana too begins to cry until the German uncle forwards them the phone number of Hind's mother, who reveals that she talked to her a couple minutes ago.

As night falls, more people leave their offices and Mahdi's options for contacting people to coordinate a rescue diminish. They resolve to post recordings of the phone calls on social media to bring attention to the girl. Finally an updated route is sent, with the two drivers, Yousef Zaino and Ahmad Madhoun preparing to embark. Another more experienced worker, Nisreen, gets Hind to talk about the beach and the ocean, which Hind highly enjoys. They record videos of the conversations and post them online. Hind's mother joins in on some of the calls. Mahdi, out of desperation, locks himself in the bathroom and plays shooter games until they get the green light.

The ambulance begins to move but debris from a recently-destroyed building blocks the road. Three hours after Hind's initial call, Zaino and Madhoun get up to 400 meters away from Hind's car when suddenly there is gunfire and the connection drops.

Hind's voice disappeared at 7:30 PM. The fate of Hind, Zaino and Madhoun remained unknown for 12 days under siege, until the Israeli army withdrew. Real-life footage of the remains of the ambulance and the car is shown; the ambulance has been completely destroyed by Israeli fire. 355 bullets hit the Hamada family's car.

The film ends with cell-phone footage of Hind resting on her bed and playing on the beach before the war.

== Cast ==
- Saja Kilani as Rana Hassan Faqih
- Motaz Malhees as Omar A. Alqam
- Amer Hlehel as Mahdi M. Aljamal
- Clara Khoury as Nisreen Jeries Qawas

== Production ==
=== Development ===
In May 2025, it was announced Kaouther Ben Hania had directed an untitled film about the killing of Hind Rajab, with principal photography concluding in Tunisia. Nadim Cheikhrouha, Odessa Rae and James Wilson serve as producers. Brad Pitt, Joaquin Phoenix, Rooney Mara, Jonathan Glazer, Alfonso Cuarón, Spike Lee, Michael Moore, Jon Kilik, Jemima Khan, Frank Giustra, Guillaume Rambourg, Elizabeth Woodward, Sarah Rambourg, and Sabine Getty are among the executive producers.

The film is a co-production between Tunisia and France.

I was in the middle of the Oscar campaign for Four Daughters, and mentally preparing to finally enter pre-production on a film I had been writing for ten years. Then, during a layover at LAX, everything shifted. I heard an audio recording of Hind Rajab begging for help. By then, her voice had already spread across the internet. I contacted the Red Crescent and asked them to let me hear the full audio. It was about 70 minutes long, and harrowing. After listening to it, I knew, without a doubt, that I had to drop everything else. I had to make this film. I spoke at length with Hind's mother, with the real people who were on the other end of that call, those who tried to help her.

— Kaouther Ben Hania

=== Filming ===
Filming took place in Tunisia over three weeks in November 2024.

The Voice of Hind Rajab was one of three films about Hind Rajab that were shot around the same time in 2024 and released in 2025. The Dutch short film Close Your Eyes Hind (2025) was shot in December 2024 and released in June 2025, and the Jordanian short film Hind Under Siege (2025) was shot in December 2024 and released in October 2025.

== Release ==
The film had its world premiere in the main competition of the 82nd Venice International Film Festival on 3 September 2025, where it was nominated for the Golden Lion. It also screened at the 2025 Toronto International Film Festival in the Special Presentations section on 7 September 2025. Prior to the film's premiere, Brad Pitt, Joaquin Phoenix, Rooney Mara, Alfonso Cuarón, Jonathan Glazer, Dede Gardner and Jeremy Kleiner onboarded as executive producers. It also received a screening in the Perlak section of the 73rd San Sebastián International Film Festival, earning a 9.52/10 score from the moviegoers voting for the City of Donostia / San Sebastián Audience Award, the highest score ever achieved at the festival.

The film is one of three films on Palestinian history to be submitted to the 98th Academy Awards for Best International Feature Film – the others being All That's Left of You and Palestine 36. The lack of distribution by American studios for the Palestinian films submitted for the 98th Academy Awards generated controversy online and among executive producers, who reportedly were "passing [the film] out of fear". Several months earlier, the Palestine documentary No Other Land (2024) went on to win the Academy Award for Best Documentary without the involvement of any American distributors; the producers ended up self-distributing the film in a small number of screens. In October 2025, Willa acquired United States distribution rights to the film, and set it for a December 16, 2025, release. It was released in Tunisian cinemas on September 10, 2025.

The film opened the first edition of the Gaza International Festival for Women's Cinema in Deir al-Balah on 26 October 2025, held during the ongoing ceasefire in Gaza. Hulu acquired U.S. streaming rights in April 2026.

In March 2026, it was reported that India's Central Board of Film Certification (CBFC) had blocked the release of the film from screening in the country's movie theaters. Variety reported that Manoj Nandwana, founder of the Mumbai-based film distributor Jai Viratra Entertainment, had been told by a CBFC member that screening the film could "break up the India–Israel relationship". On 2 June 2026, the film was cleared without any cuts by the CBFC and was released in Indian theatres on 19 June 2026.

== Reception ==
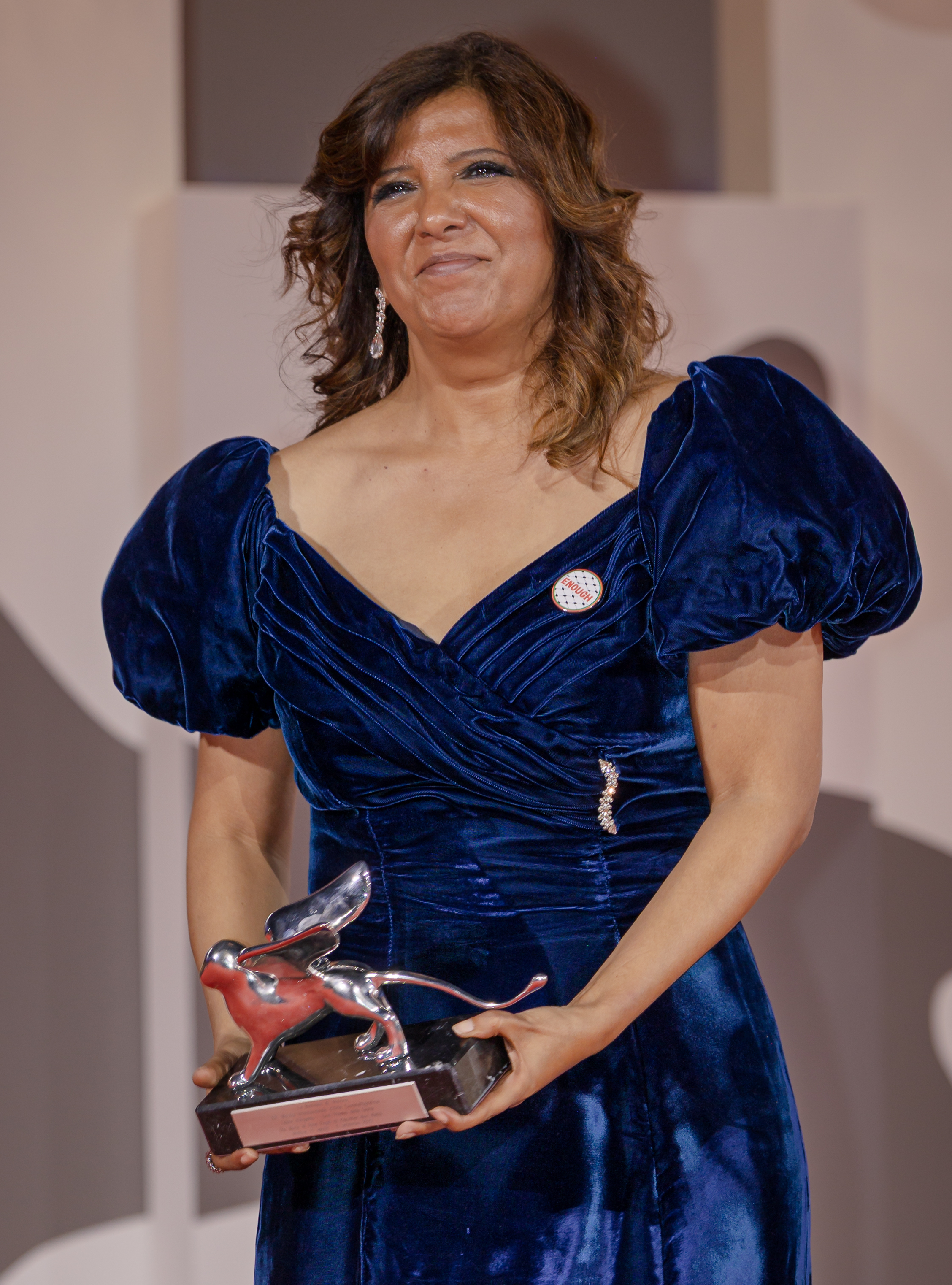
Director Kaouther Ben Hania holding the Grand Jury Prize awarded to The Voice of Hind Rajab at the 82nd Venice International Film Festival.

=== Critical response ===
The film received a 23-minute, 50-second standing ovation at its Venice premiere, beating the previous record for longest recorded applause at a film festival; Pan's Labyrinth had received a 22-minute standing ovation at the 2006 Cannes Film Festival.

On the review aggregator website Rotten Tomatoes, 93% of 141 critics' reviews are positive, with an average rating of 8.5/10. The website's consensus reads: "Incorporating real-life elements that are as difficult to witness as they are impossible to forget, The Voice of Hind Rajab is a harrowing docudrama that makes a powerful appeal to humanity." Metacritic, which uses a weighted average, assigned the film a score of 81 out of 100, based on 27 critics, indicating "universal acclaim".

Brian Tallerico of RogerEbert.com said of the film, "I'm always a little conflicted when a tragedy involving a child is used in filmmaking, but I also believe that true action sometimes requires being confronted with visions of true horror instead of just reading or hearing about them. The Voice of Hind Rajab is the confrontation its victim deserves." Slate's Sam Adams wrote, "Ben Hania periodically reminds the audience just how faithful the re-creation they're watching is. She fills the screen with the audio waveform of Rajab's voice, the digital file name stamped in the corner, and occasionally allows the voices of the real dispatchers the actors are playing to overlap with their dialogue. The movie keeps reminding us how close we are to what actually happened, climaxing with a shot that blends real video and the actors' reenactment. But the heart of the conflict, like Rajab herself, is impossible to reach." Peter Bradshaw of The Guardian gave the film 4/5 stars, writing, "there is a reckless, ruthless kind of provocative brilliance in what Ben Hania is doing. Is it in bad taste? Problematic? Well, in a world where directors busy themselves and us with made-up stories about made-up people, Ben Hania is at least grabbing one of the most relevant issues of our time with both hands and finding a way to thrust it under our noses."

=== Accolades ===
The film was selected as the Tunisian entry for the Best International Feature Film at the 98th Academy Awards.

Award	Date of ceremony	Category	Recipient(s)	Result	Ref.
Venice International Film Festival	6 September 2025	Golden Lion	Kaouther Ben Hania	Nominated	
Venice International Film Festival	6 September 2025	Grand Jury Prize	Kaouther Ben Hania	Won	
Venice International Film Festival	6 September 2025	ARCA CinemaGiovani Award – Best Film of Venezia 81	Kaouther Ben Hania	Won	
Venice International Film Festival	6 September 2025	CICT - UNESCO Enrico Fulchignoni Award	Kaouther Ben Hania	Won	
Venice International Film Festival	6 September 2025	Croce Rossa Italiana Award	Kaouther Ben Hania	Won	
Venice International Film Festival	6 September 2025	Edipo Re Award	Kaouther Ben Hania	Won	
Venice International Film Festival	6 September 2025	Leoncino d'Oro Award	Kaouther Ben Hania	Won	
Venice International Film Festival	6 September 2025	Sorriso Diverso Venezia Award for Best Foreign Film	Kaouther Ben Hania	Won	
Venice International Film Festival	6 September 2025	UNIMED Award	Kaouther Ben Hania	Won	
San Sebastián International Film Festival	27 September 2025	City of Donostia / San Sebastián Audience Award for Best Film	The Voice of Hind Rajab	Won	
Film Fest Gent	18 October 2025	Grand Prix for Best Film	The Voice of Hind Rajab	Won	
BFI London Film Festival	19 October 2025	Best Film	The Voice of Hind Rajab	Nominated	
Chicago International Film Festival	24 October 2025	Gold Hugo	The Voice of Hind Rajab	Nominated	
Chicago International Film Festival	24 October 2025	Jury Award	The Voice of Hind Rajab	Won	
Asia Pacific Screen Awards	27 November 2025	Best Screenplay	Kaouther Ben Hania	Nominated	
Hamptons International Film Festival	7 November 2025	Brizzola Family Foundation Award for Films of Conflict & Resolution	The Voice of Hind Rajab	Won	
Belgian Film Critics Association	11 January 2026	Grand Prix	The Voice of Hind Rajab	Nominated	
Golden Globe Awards	11 January 2026	Best Non-English Language Film	The Voice of Hind Rajab	Nominated	
European Film Awards	17 January 2026	European Sound Designer	Amal Attia, Elias Boughedir, Lars Ginzel, Gwennolé Le Borgne, Marion Papinot	Nominated	
Lumière Awards	18 January 2026	Best International Co-Production	The Voice of Hind Rajab	Nominated	
Cinema for Peace Awards	16 February 2026	Cinema for Peace Dove for The Most Valuable Film of the Year	The Voice of Hind Rajab	Won	
British Academy Film Awards	22 February 2026	Best Film Not in the English Language	The Voice of Hind Rajab	Nominated	
Academy Awards	15 March 2026	Best International Feature Film	Tunisia	Nominated	
David di Donatello	May 6, 2026	Best International Film	The Voice of Hind Rajab	Nominated	

== See also ==
- Cultural discourse about the Gaza genocide
- List of submissions to the 98th Academy Awards for Best International Feature Film
- List of Tunisian submissions for the Academy Award for Best International Feature Film
