= El Khawa =

- Promotional poster
- Also known as: The Brothers
- Genre: Drama
- Written by: Sara Berretima
- Directed by: Madih Belaid
- Starring: Hassane Kechache; Chahrazad Krachni; Fizia Tougourti; Zahra Harkat; Shirine Boutella; Manel Djaafar
- Country of origin: Algeria
- Original language: Arabic
- No. of seasons: 2
- No. of episodes: 57

Production
- Production locations: Algiers, Algeria
- Camera setup: Multiple
- Production companies: Not Found Prod (Season 1); Wellcom Advertising (Seasons 1-2)

Original release
- Network: El Djazairia One
- Release: May 27, 2017 – June 14, 2018

El Khawa (Arabic: الخاوة, translated as The Brothers) is an Algerian television series, directed by Madih Belaid. It premiered on May 27, 2017 on El Djazairia One.

== Description ==
The series revolves around a family mystery, buried for more than 20 years, this mystery was revealed after the death of the father. Who worked as a famous businessman and left a great legacy both inside and outside the country. The series deals with family problems caused by material considerations.

== Cast ==
Actor/Actress	Character
Hmed Ben Aissa	Abdelkader Moustaphaoui
Aïda Guechoud	Khdawaij
Djamal Ghouti	Karim Mustaphaoui
Hassane Kechache	Hassan Mustaphaoui
Fizia Tougourti	Djazaya Mustaphaoui
Zahra Harkat	Yassmine Mustaphaoui
Shirine Boutella	Amina Mustaphaoui
Manel Djaafar	Manel Mustaphaoui

== Overview ==
Season	No. of episodes	Originally aired	
Season	No. of episodes	Series premiere	Series finale
1	28	May 27, 2017	June 23, 2017
2	29	May 17, 2018	June 14, 2018
