= Arab Blues =

2019 film

- French theatrical release poster
- French: Un divan à Tunis
- Directed by: Manele Labidi Labbé
- Screenplay by: Manele Labidi Labbé
- Produced by: Serge Hayat; Jean-Christophe Reymond
- Starring: Golshifteh Farahani; Majd Mastoura
- Cinematography: Laurent Brunet
- Edited by: Yorgos Lamprinos
- Music by: Flemming Nordkrog
- Production companies: Kazak Productions; Arte France Cinéma
- Distributed by: Diaphana Distribution (France); Hakka Distribution (Tunisia)
- Release dates: 4 September 2019 (Venice); 12 February 2020 (France); 26 February 2020 (Tunisia)
- Running time: 88 minutes
- Countries: France; Tunisia
- Languages: Arabic; French
- Budget: €1.990.000; (≃$2.4 million)
- Box office: $3.7 million

Arab Blues (Arabic: أريكة في تونس, romanized: Arīkah fī Tūnis, French: Un divan à Tunis, lit. 'A couch in Tunis') is a 2019 French-Tunisian comedy film written and directed by Manele Labidi Labbé, in her feature debut. Starring Golshifteh Farahani as Selma, it follows a psychoanalyst moving back to her native Tunisia.

The film had its world premiere in the Giornate degli Autori section of the 76th Venice International Film Festival on 4 September 2019. It was theatrically released in France on 12 February 2020 by Diaphana Distribution, and in Tunisia on 26 February by Hakka Distribution.

== Plot ==
The film is about a Tunisian psychoanalyst Selma who, after having been educated in Paris, moves back to Tunisia to open a psychoanalytic practice.

== Cast ==
- Golshifteh Farahani as Selma
- Hichem Yacoubi as Raouf
- Moncef Anjegui as Mourad
- Majd Mastoura as Naim

== Release ==
The film had its world premiere at the 76th Venice International Film Festival, during the Venice Days, on 4 September 2019. Its North American debut was in the Contemporary World Cinema section at the 2019 Toronto International Film Festival on 8 September 2019.

== Reception ==
=== Box office ===
Arab Blues grossed $3.7 million worldwide, against a production budget of about $2.4 million.

=== Critical response ===
On French review aggregator AlloCiné, the film holds an average rating of 3.7 out of 5, based on 24 critics' reviews.
