= Who Do I Belong To =

- Directed by: Meryam Joobeur
- Written by: Meryam Joobeur
- Produced by: Annick Blanc; Sarra Ben Hassen; Maria Gracia Turgeon; Nadim Cheikhrouha; Meryam Joobeur
- Starring: Salha Nasraoui
- Cinematography: Vincent Gonneville
- Edited by: Meryam Joobeur; Maxime Mathis
- Music by: Peter Venne
- Production companies: Instinct Bleu; Midi la Nuit; 1888 Films; Eye Eye Pictures; Godolphin Films; Tanit Films
- Distributed by: Maison 4:3
- Release date: February 22, 2024 (Berlin)
- Countries: Tunisia; Canada; France; Norway; Qatar; Saudi Arabia
- Language: Arabic

Who Do I Belong To (Arabic: ماء العين, romanized: Māʼ al-ʻAyn, lit. 'Eye Water', French: Là d’où l’on vient) is a drama film, directed by Meryam Joobeur and released in 2024. The film stars Salha Nasraoui as Aïcha, a woman in Tunisia whose son returns from fighting in Syria with a mysterious woman, concurrently with a slate of strange disappearances in the village.

The cast also includes Mohamed Hassine Grayaa, Malek Mechergui, Adam Bessa, Dea Liane, Rayen Mechergui, and Chaker Mechergui.

== Production ==
The film is an expansion on the themes of Joobeur's 2018 short film Brotherhood (Ikhwène), but features some key story differences, including the gender of the central character. It went into development in 2021, with the working title Motherhood. Joobeur participated in the Sundance Screenwriters' Lab at the 2021 Sundance Film Festival, where she was awarded the $10,000 Sundance Institute/NHK Award toward the film's production.

Shooting began in 2022 in Tunisia. In December 2023, the film won a €30,000 post-production grant in the Atlas Workshops program at the Marrakech International Film Festival.

== Release ==
It premiered in competition at the 74th Berlin International Film Festival. It was screened in the Borsos Competition program at the 2024 Whistler Film Festival. Nasraoui won the award for Best Performance in a Borsos Competition film, while Joobeur and Maxime Mathis won the award for Best Editing in a Borsos Competition Film.
