= Dachra =

2018 Tunisian film

- Poster
- Directed by: Abdelhamid Bouchnak
- Screenplay by: Abdelhamid Bouchnak
- Produced by: Abdelhamid Bouchnak; Omar Ben Ali
- Starring: Yasmine Dimassi; Aziz Jbali; Bilel Slatnia; Hela Ayed; Hedi Majri; Bahri Rahali
- Cinematography: Hatem Nechi
- Edited by: Abdelhamid Bouchnak
- Music by: Rached Hmaoui; Samy Ben Said
- Release date: 2018
- Running time: 113 minutes
- Country: Tunisia
- Language: Arabic
- Box office: $69,010

Dachra is a 2018 Tunisian horror film, written and directed by Abdelhamid Bouchnak as his first feature film.

== Plot ==
Three journalism students, Yasmine, Walid and Bilel, set off to investigate a cold case for a school film project. After visiting a mental hospital to interview Mongia, the mutilated survivor of an attack 20 years before, the trail leads them out to an isolated village. Before they fully understand what is happening, they find themselves beset by cannibal witches.

== Cast ==
- Yasmine Dimassi as Yasmine
- Aziz Jbali as Walid
- Bilel Slatnia as Bilel
- Hela Ayed as Mongia

== Reception ==
Dachra was the closing film for International Critics' Week at the 75th Venice International Film Festival.
