= Le Poisson noyé =

- Directed by: Malik Amara
- Screenplay by: Malik Amara
- Produced by: Nomadis Images
- Starring: Fethi Akkari, Fatima Ben Saïdane, Sondos Belhassen
- Cinematography: Nebil Saidi
- Edited by: Penda Houzanbge
- Release date: 2008
- Running time: 18'
- Country: Tunisia

Le Poisson noyé is a 2008 film.

== Synopsis ==
This fable tells of an old fishmonger who dies and resuscitates several times. The man is a despicable character and his resurrections gives rise to general curiosity. But superstition soon takes over in the villagers’ hearts, they believe nature should reclaim its rights.

== Awards ==
- Beirut International Film Festival 2008
- FESPACO 2009
