= Golden Butterfly (film) =

2021 film

- Directed by: Abdelhamid Bouchnak
- Release date: 2021
- Country: Tunisia
- Languages: Tunisian Arabic; French

Golden Butterfly (French: Papillon d'Or, Arabic: الفراشة الذهبية, romanized: al-farāsha aḏ-ḏahabiyya) is a 2021 Tunisian drama film directed by Abdelhamid Bouchnak. It was selected as the Tunisian entry for the Best International Feature Film at the 94th Academy Awards.

== See also ==
- List of submissions to the 94th Academy Awards for Best International Feature Film
- List of Tunisian submissions for the Academy Award for Best International Feature Film
