= Benda Bilili! =

- Directed by: Renaud Barret; Florent de La Tullaye
- Screenplay by: Renaud Barret; Florent de La Tullaye
- Produced by: Screenrunner; La Belle Kinoise
- Cinematography: Florent de La Tullaye Renaud Barret
- Edited by: Jean-Christophe Hym
- Music by: Staff Benda Bilili
- Release date: 2010
- Running time: 84 minutes
- Countries: Democratic Republic of the Congo; France
- Languages: French; Lingala
- Box office: US$127,362

Benda Bilili! is a 2010 documentary by Renaud Barret and Florent de La Tullaye, produced by Yves Chanvillard and Nadim Cheikhrouha (Screenrunner).

The film follows the Kinshasa street musician group Staff Benda Bilili, whose core members of the group are disabled due to polio. "Benda Bilili" means "look beyond appearances" in Lingala. Renaud Barret and his partner Florent de La Tullaye first spotted the group performing on the streets of Kinshasa in 2004.

Shooting lasted 5 years. Benda Bilili! received standing ovations when it opened at the 2010 Cannes Film Festival, with the group in attendance, and performing at the Directors' Fortnight opening party.

The film opened in American theatres in 2011, although a planned U.S. tour in conjunction with the film had to be canceled due to passport problems.

== Synopsis ==
A musical documentary depicting the formation of Staff Benda Bilili, a band of street musicians from the Democratic Republic of Congo who became popular internationally. Charting the group's progress across several years, Benda Bilili! covers the band's history from its beginnings in Kinshasa until its successful European tour.

== Awards ==
- Opening Film, Directors' Fortnight 2010
- Nominated for Best Documentary at Cesar Awards 2010
- Golden Star for Best Documentary, French press critics Awards 2010
- Dublin's Audience Award, Jameson Dublin International Film Festival 2011
