= The Magic (film) =

1996 film

Le magique
- Directed by: Azdine Melliti
- Written by: Azdine Melliti
- Starring: Ahmed Chebil
- Release date: 1996
- Running time: 95 minutes
- Country: Tunisia
- Languages: Arabic; French

The Magic (Le magique) is a 1996 Tunisian drama film directed by Azdine Melliti. The film was selected as the Tunisian entry for the Best Foreign Language Film at the 68th Academy Awards, but was not accepted as a nominee.

== Cast ==
- Ahmed Chebil as Deanie
- Azdine Melliti as Caesar's Father
- Mehdi Saffar as Caesar
- Kamel Touati as Deanie's Father

== See also ==
- List of submissions to the 68th Academy Awards for Best Foreign Language Film
- List of Tunisian submissions for the Academy Award for Best Foreign Language Film
