= Vincent Gonneville =

Canadian cinematographer

Vincent Gonneville is a Canadian cinematographer. He is most noted for his work on the 2022 film Nouveau Québec, for which he received a Canadian Screen Award nomination for Best Cinematography at the 11th Canadian Screen Awards in 2023. His other credits include Brotherhood (Ikhwène), Who Do I Belong To (Mé el Aïn), and Hunting Daze (Jour de chasse).
