= Hedi (film) =

2016 film

- Film poster
- نحبك هادي
- Directed by: Mohamed Ben Attia
- Written by: Mohamed Ben Attia
- Starring: Majd Mastoura
- Music by: Omar Aloulou
- Release dates: 16 February 2016 (Berlin); 14 March 2016 (Tunisia)
- Running time: 88 minutes
- Country: Tunisia
- Language: Arabic

Hedi (Arabic: نحبك هادي, romanized: Nuhibuk Hadi, lit. 'We Love You Hadi') is a 2016 Tunisian drama film directed by Mohamed Ben Attia. It was selected to compete for the Golden Bear at the 66th Berlin International Film Festival. At Berlin it won the Best First Feature Award and Majd Mastoura won the Silver Bear for Best Actor.

== Plot ==
Hedi (Majd Mastoura) is a young Tunisian man going through an existential crisis. He always done what was told never questioned the conventions of his society and always sought to please his mother Baya who always arranged everything for him. Despite having a decent job as a salesman in a country with an increasingly volatile economic, Hedi is indifferent to his job. His mother is arranging his wedding to Khedija, a relationship that he is apathetic to.

However, a week prior to the actual wedding Hedi meets Rim with whom he starts a passionate affair. Unlike Khedija who comes from a conservative family, Rim is a well travelled independent woman with an outgoing character. Rim works as an itinerant dancer and event coordinator for tourists at hotels. Hedi is left with a hard decision to make, settle down for a mediocre marriage or follow his globetrotting sweetheart.

== Cast ==
- Majd Mastoura as Hedi
- Rym Ben Messaoud as Rym
- Sabah Bouzouita as Baya
- Omnia Ben Ghali as Khedija
- Hakim Boumsaoudi as Ahmed

== Reception ==
On review aggregator website Rotten Tomatoes, the film holds an approval rating of 100% based on 11 reviews, and an average rating of 7.2/10. As of 2019, the film had grossed $406,960 internationally.
