= Brotherhood (2018 film) =

- Official film poster
- Arabic: إخوان
- Literally: Brothers
- Directed by: Meryam Joobeur
- Written by: Meryam Joobeur
- Produced by: Habib Attia; Sarra Ben Hassen; Maria Gracia Turgeon; Meryam Joobeur
- Starring: Kais Ayari; Mohamed Graïaa; Mouldi Kriden; Salha Nasraoui
- Cinematography: Vincent Gonneville
- Edited by: Anouk Deschênes
- Music by: Peter Venne
- Production companies: Cinétéléfilms; Midi la Nuit
- Distributed by: Travelling Distribution
- Release date: September 7, 2018 (TIFF)
- Running time: 25 minutes
- Countries: Canada; Tunisia; Qatar; Sweden
- Language: Arabic
- Box office: $330,661

Brotherhood (Arabic: إخوان, romanized: Ikhwène, lit. 'Brothers') is a short film directed by Meryam Joobeur and released in September 2018. The film explores tensions in a Tunisian family when the eldest son returns home with a new Syrian wife who wears a full niqab, igniting the father's suspicions that his son has joined ISIL. The film's title was chosen to reflect both the familial connotations of the word "brotherhood" and its use in the name of the controversial Islamist organization Muslim Brotherhood.

== Production ==
The film is set and filmed in the Sajnan region of northern Tunisia and the brother actors found while Joobeur and cinematographer Vincent Gonneville were scouting the area for a different project, crossing paths with the brothers in a field as they were herding their flock of sheep.

== Release and reception ==
The film premiered at the 2018 Toronto International Film Festival, where it won the award for Best Canadian Short Film. In December 2018, it was named in the TIFF's year-end Canada's Top Ten list. At the 21st Quebec Cinema Awards in 2019, the film won the Prix Iris for Best Short Film. The film received a nomination for the Best Live Action Short Film at the 92nd Academy Awards.

Joobeur's feature directorial debut Who Do I Belong To (Mé el Aïn), premiering in 2024, centres on a similar scenario but features some key story differences, including changing the central character from a father to a mother.
