= Fatima Ben Saïdane =

Tunisian actress (born 1949)

Fatima Ben Saïdane فاطمة بن سعيدان
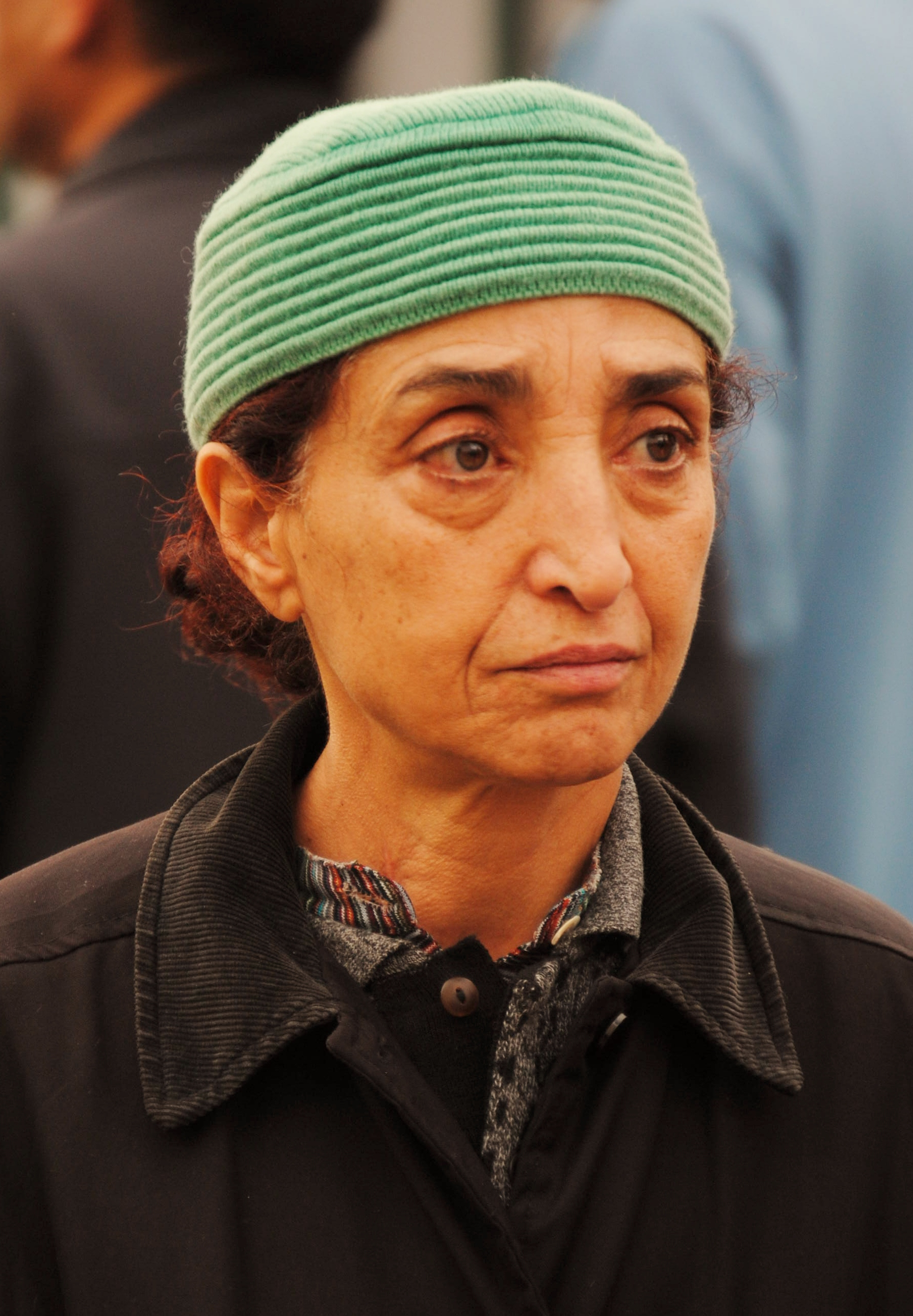
- Born: Fatima Ben Saïdane; 25 December 1949 (age 76); Tunis, Tunisia
- Occupation: Actress
- Years active: 1989–2020

Fatima Ben Saïdane (born 25 December 1949) is a Tunisian actress. One of the earliest pillars of Tunisian cinema, she was best known for her roles in the blockbuster critically acclaimed films Making Of, Halfaouine: Boy of the Terraces and Thala My Love.

== Personal life ==
Ben Saïdane was born on 25 December 1949 in Tunis, Tunisia.

== Career ==
Ben Saïdane started her film career in 1989 with the film Arab and played a minor role 'Asfour'. In the same year, she acted in the film Layla, My Reason. In 1990, she played the role 'Salouha' in the film Halfaouine: Boy of the Terraces. After many minor supportive roles in late 1990s, she made lead appearance in six short and feature films in 2006: 10 Courts, 10 Regards, Dementia, Me, My Sister and the Thing, Mrs Bahja, Making Of and The TV Is Coming.

== Partial filmography ==
Year	Film	Role	Genre	Ref.
1994	The Silences of the Palace		Film	
2002	The Daughter of Keltoum		Film	
2006	Making Of		Film	
2008	Le Poisson noyé		Short film	
2013	Get Married	Mme Lina	Short film	
2014	The Night of the Blind Moon		Short film	
2015	Chtar 50		Short film	
2015	Narcissus	Arousssia	Film	
2015	Dicta Shot		Film	
2016	Sweet Smell of Spring	Salouha	Film	
2016	Chronique de mon village	Grand-mère	Film	
2016	Thala My Love	Shift	Film	
2016	WOH!	Zakia	Film	
2017	Benzine		Film	
2017	Water Rumours		Film	
2017	El Jaida		Film	
2017	When the Sky Began to Scream		Short film	
2018	Bolbol	Bolbol	Short film	
2019	Porto Farina	Aishah	Film	
2019	The Scarecrows	Dora	Film	
2020	Houria	Houria	Short film	
2020	Machki w'Âoued	Rabii's Mother	Film	
