= Mimesis (magazine) =

Literary magazine based in Norwich, England

Mimesis was a quarterly literary magazine based in Norwich that dealt predominantly with poetry. The magazine was started in 2007. Issues appeared in January, April, July and November. The journal stood out for the number of pages filled purely by poems. An interview with a well-known poet was also featured in each issue. A small number of greyscale artworks appeared alongside the writing.
