= Dear Son =

2018 Tunisian film

- Film poster
- Directed by: Mohamed Ben Attia
- Screenplay by: Mohamed Ben Attia
- Produced by: Dora Bouchoucha Fourati
- Starring: Mohamed Dhrif; Mouna Mejri; Imen Cherif; Zakaria Ben Ayyed
- Cinematography: Frédéric Noirhomme
- Edited by: Nadia Ben Rachid
- Music by: Omar Aloulou
- Production companies: Les Films du Fleuve; Tanit Films; Nomadis Images
- Distributed by: Bac Films
- Release date: 13 May 2018 (Cannes)
- Running time: 100 minutes
- Countries: Tunisia; Belgium; France
- Language: Arabic

Dear Son (Arabic: ولدي) is a 2018 Tunisian drama film directed by Mohamed Ben Attia. It was selected to screen in the Directors' Fortnight section at the 2018 Cannes Film Festival. It was selected as the Tunisian entry for the Best International Feature Film at the 92nd Academy Awards, but it was not nominated.

== Plot ==
Riadh is about to retire from his work as a forklift operator in Tunis. The life he shares with his wife Nazli revolves around their son Sami, who suffers from repeated migraine attacks while preparing for his high school exams. When he finally seems to be getting better, Sami suddenly disappears.

== Cast ==
- Mohamed Dhrif as Riadh
- Mouna Mejri as Nazli
- Imen Cherif as Sameh
- Zakaria Ben Ayyed as Sami

== See also ==
- List of submissions to the 92nd Academy Awards for Best International Feature Film
- List of Tunisian submissions for the Academy Award for Best International Feature Film
