= Majd Mastoura =

Tunisian actor

- Born: Menzel Abderrahmane, Tunisia
- Occupation: Actor
- Years active: 2014–present
- Awards: Silver Bear for Best Actor 2016

Majd Mastoura (Arabic: مجد مستورة) is a Tunisian film actor and translator. At the 66th Berlin International Film Festival he won the Silver Bear for Best Actor for his role in the film Hedi.

== Early life and education ==
Majd Mastoura was born in Menzel Abderrahmane, Bizerte, to a military officer father and a classical Arabic teacher mother.

From a young age Mastoura was exposed to theatre, literature, and politics.

== Film career ==
In 2012, he started the first spoken-word event in his country, which he dubbed "Street Word". He worked on these events with his close friend Amine Gharbi. These events carried on until 2014, which marked the last version of "Street Word".

In 2013, Majd was given his first role in Bidoun 2, which was his first feature film. In 2015, Majd auditioned for the role of Hedi, which he landed and was eventually awarded the Silver bear in the 66th Berlinale.

== Writing and translation ==
Majd also writes in Tunisian Arabic (derja) as a way to show support to his compatriots. In the beginning he kept his writings to himself, then he started submitting them to writing competitions in 2009.

He also translated the French philosophical work La chose publique into Tunisian. He explains his choice to translate into Tunisian Arabic (rather than Standard Arabic) by his emotional relationship to the language (here referred to as dārja, meaning "common"): "My relationship with Tunisian dārja is like that of any Tunisian, I speak in dārja, I think in dārja, and I dream in dārja." He explains that, although French and Standard Arabic are part of his linguistic repertoire, "whenever a word comes out of my mouth spontaneously —from surprise or dismay or pleasure or pain—it comes out in dārja."

== Selected filmography ==
- Bidoun 2 (2014)
- Hedi (2016)
- Arab Blues (2019)
