= Abdelhamid Bouchnak =

Tunisian filmmaker

Abdelhamid Bouchnak عبد الحميد بوشناق
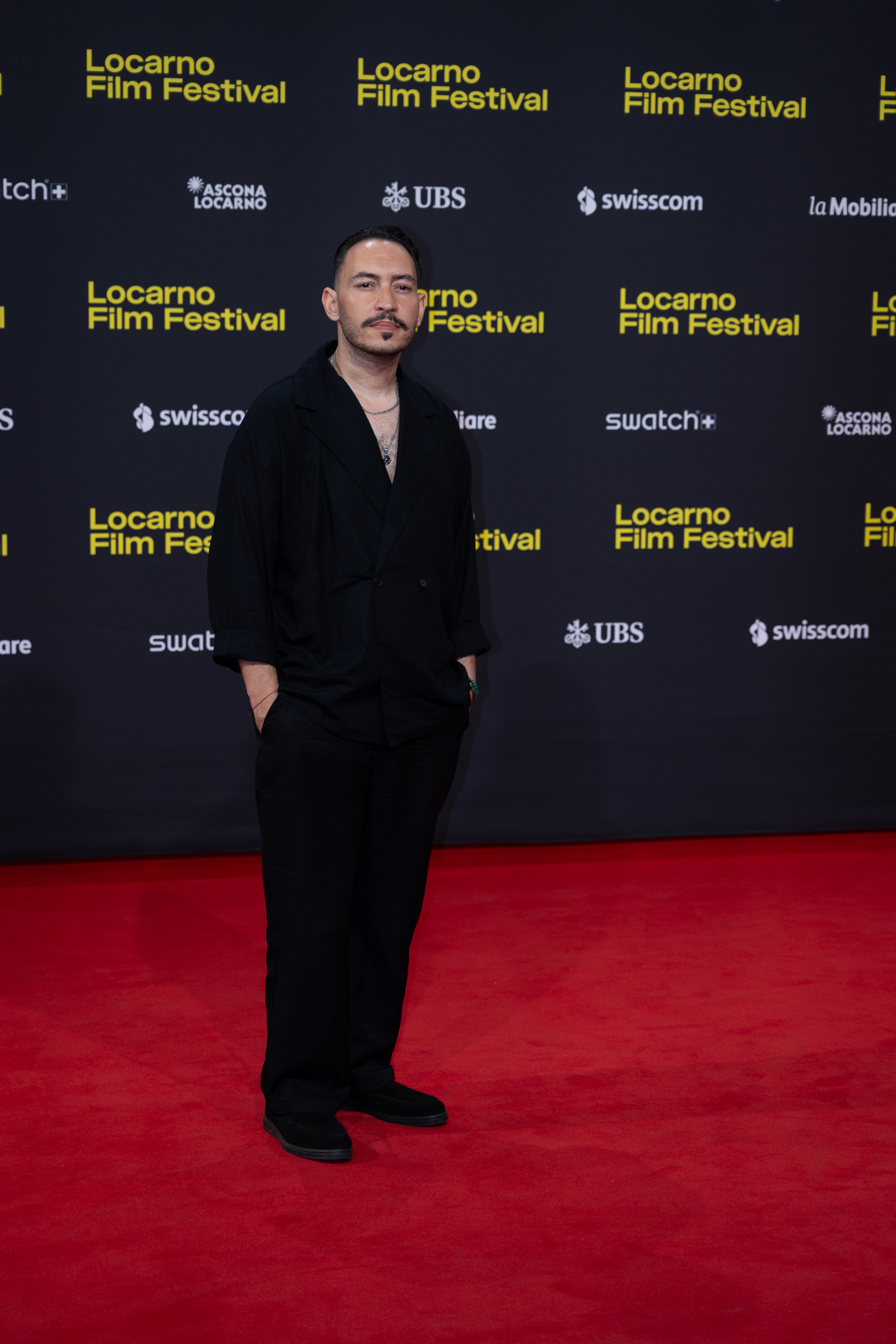
- Bouchnak in 2026
- Born: Abdelhamid Bouchnak; 1984 (age 41–42); Tunis, Tunisia
- Education: University of Montreal
- Occupation: Actor
- Years active: 2009–present
- Father: Lotfi Bouchnak

Abdelhamid Bouchnak (Bosnian: Abdulhamid Bošnjak, born in 1984), is a Tunisian filmmaker. He is best known as the director of Tunisian horror film Dachra.

== Personal life ==
He was born in 1984 in Tunis, Tunisia. His father Lotfi Bouchnak is a popular Tunisian singer and renowned oud player. Abdelhamid studied at the Higher School of Science and Technology of Design in Tunis (ESAC) in Gammarth. Then he attended to the University of Montreal and graduated with a degree in film studies.

== Career ==
After graduation, he became a director within the company Shkoon Production. However, initially he worked as a cinematographer in the web series Ta7ana, and the television series Hedhoukom. He also involved in short films as the cinematographer in Alliance in 2011 and then Le Bonbon in 2016. After few years, he directed the historical docufiction, Jadis Kerkouane.

In 2018, Abdelhamid directed his maiden feature film, Dachra, a horror film. The film received critical acclaim and later selected at the International Critics' Week of the Venice Film Festival. After the success of the film, he directed season 1 of the television series Nouba which broadcast on Nessma during the month of Ramadan in 2019. Then he directed the Season 2 of the same series, titled Ochèg Eddenia which was broadcast in 2020 on Attessia TV and the Artify platform.

His second feature film, L'Aiguille, was released in December 2023 in Tunisia and tells the story of a couple and their intersex newborn.

In 2024, he directed the series Ragouj, which aired on Nessma.

== Filmography ==
Year	Film	Role	Genre	Ref.
2010	Alliance	Director, writer	Short film	
2016	Hethoukom	Director, writer, camera operator, editor, actor: Fam	TV series	
2017	Once Kerkouane	Director, cinematographer	Documentary	
2018	Dachra	Director, writer, editor	Film	
2018	Le Bonbon	Director, writer, producer, editor	Short film	
2019	Nouba	Director, writer, producer	TV series	
2021	kan ye makanich	Director, writer	TV series	
2021	Golden Butterfly			
2021	L'aiguille	Director, writer	Film	
