= Kaouther Ben Hania =

Tunisian film director

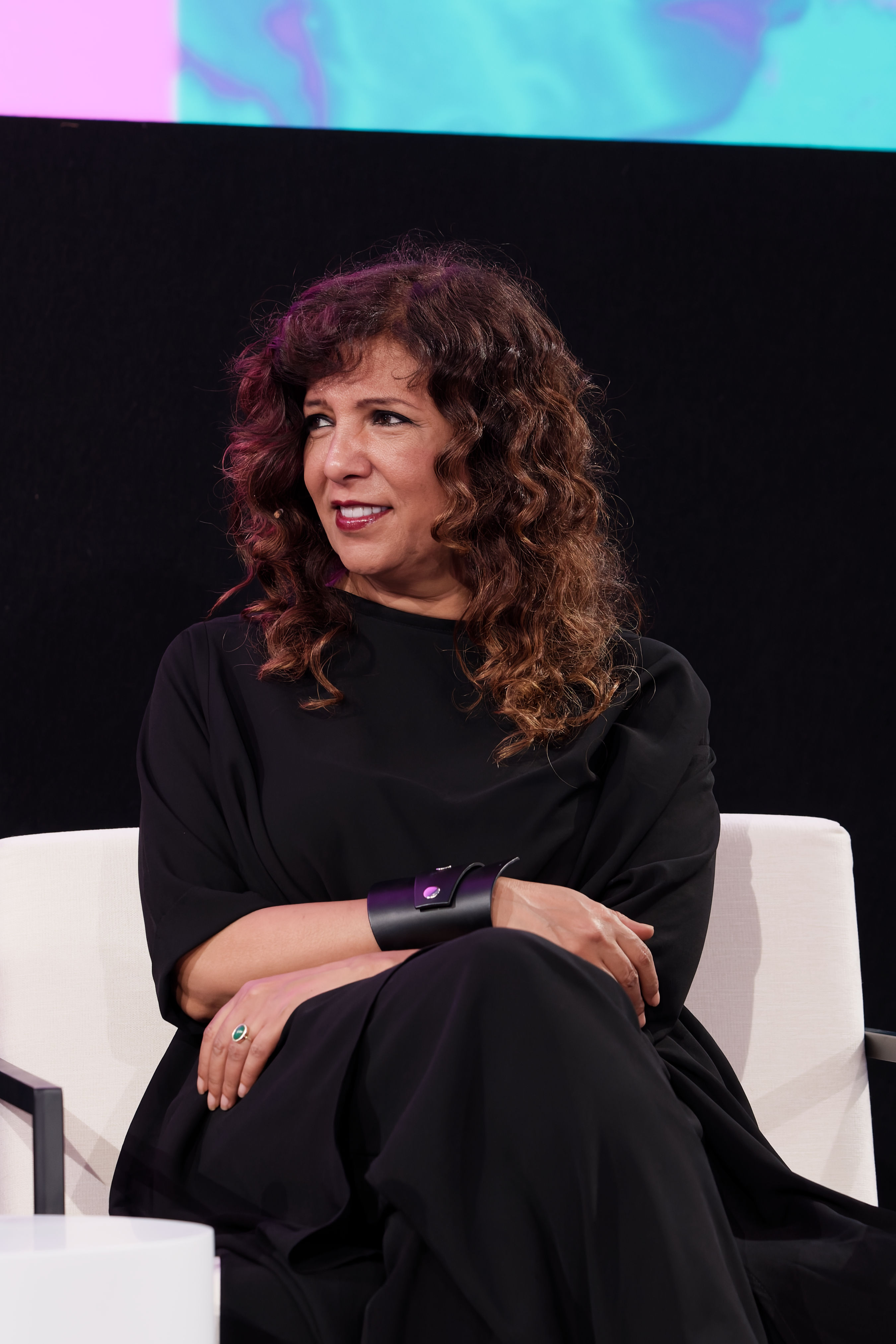
- Ben Hania in 2026
- Born: Sidi Bouzid, Tunisia
- Education: Ecole des Arts et du Cinéma, La Fémis
- Occupations: Script writer; Screen Director
- Years active: 2006–present
- Known for: Beauty and the Dogs; The Man Who Sold His Skin; Four Daughters; The Voice of Hind Rajab

Kaouther Ben Hania, also written Kaouther Ben Henia or Kaouther Benhenia (Arabic: كوثر بن هنية, romanized: Kawthar ibn Hanīyah), is a Tunisian filmmaker.

She is best known for her feature films The Man Who Sold His Skin (2020) and The Voice of Hind Rajab (2025), both of which were nominated for the Academy Award for Best International Feature representing Tunisia. Her documentary Four Daughters (2023) was nominated for the Academy Award for Best Documentary.

== Early life ==
Kaouther Ben Hania was born in Sidi Bouzid. She studied at the Ecole des Arts et du Cinéma (EDAC) in Tunisia, then studied at La Fémis and the Sorbonne in Paris.

She studied from 2002 to 2004 at the Tunis School of Arts and Cinema. During this training she directed several short films, one of which, La Breche, was noticed. In 2003, she also participated in a feature film writing workshop funded by Euromed. In 2004, she continued her training at La Fémis, first at the summer university and then in 2004–2005.

In 2006, she directed another short film, Moi, ma sœur et la chose, inspired by the short story Le Jeune homme and l'enfant et la question by Mohsen Ben Hania. She then worked for Al Jazeera Documentary Channel until 2007. Then she directed several feature films, distinguished in various festivals, while resuming her studies in 2007–2008 at the Sorbonne Nouvelle University.

== Career ==
Her first feature film was Le Challat de Tunis, released in 2014, a social satire with an ironic tone, while addressing, like the following works, the relationships between women and men.

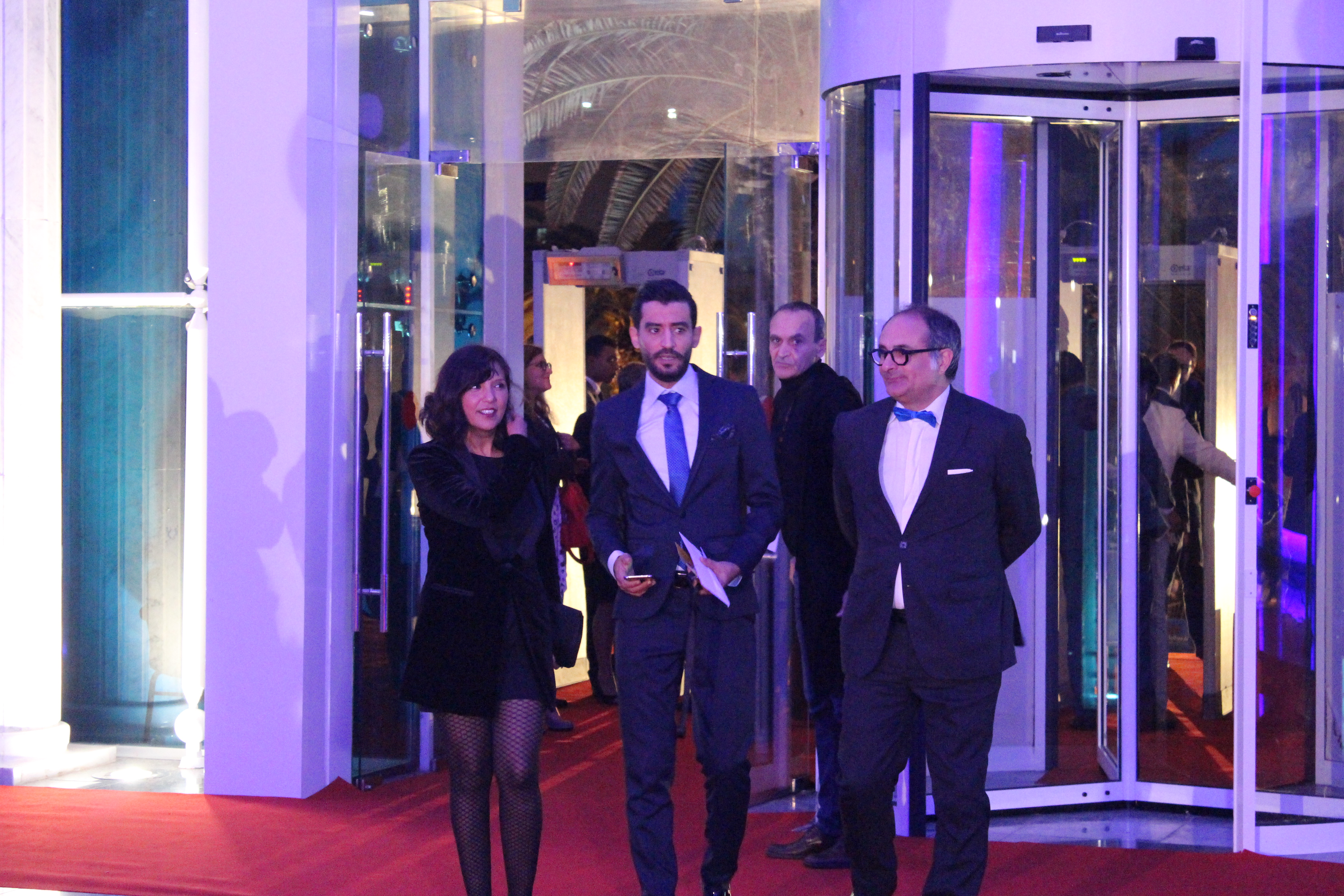
Ben Hania at the 2018 Carthage Film Festival

Her 2017 film Beauty and the Dogs was selected to the Un Certain Regard category at the 2017 Cannes Film Festival. It was also selected as the Tunisian entry for the Best Foreign Language Film at the 91st Academy Awards, but was not nominated. In 2018, the film was nominated for the Lumière Award for Best Francophone Film.

Her film The Man Who Sold His Skin (2020) had its world premiere in the Orizzonti section of the 77th Venice International Film Festival. It was also selected as the Tunisian entry for the Best Foreign Language Film and was nominated at the 93rd Academy Awards, making it the first Tunisian film to be nominated for the Oscars.

In 2023, her documentary Four Daughters was selected for the main competition at the Cannes Film Festival, where it won the L'Œil d'or and the François Chalais Prize. At the 49th César Awards it won the César Award for Best Documentary Film. Film won Cinema for Peace Dove for Women's Empowerment. It was also nominated for Best Documentary Feature at the 96th Academy Awards.

In 2025, her docudrama The Voice of Hind Rajab received a 23-minute standing ovation at the 82nd Venice International Film Festival, winning the Grand Jury Prize. The film was also nominated for the Academy Award for Best International Feature at the 98th Academy Awards.

== Filmography ==
=== Feature films ===
Year	English title	Original title	Notes
2017	Beauty and the Dogs	على كف عفريت	
2020	The Man Who Sold His Skin	الرجل الذي باع ظهره	
2025	The Voice of Hind Rajab	صوت هند رجب	
TBA	Mimesis		Post-production

=== Documentaries ===
Year	English title	Original title	Notes
2010	Imams Go to School	Les imams vont à l'école	
2013	The Challat of Tunis	شلاط تونس	Also actress
2016	Zaineb Hates the Snow	زينب تكره الثلج	
2023	Four Daughters	بنات ألفة	

=== Short films ===
Year	English title	Original title	Notes
2004	The Breach	La Brèche	
2006	Me, My Sister and the Thing	Moi, ma sœur et la chose	
2013	Wooden Hand	يد اللوح	
2018	Sheikh's Watermelons	بطيخ الشيخ	
2021	I and The Stupid Boy (22nd in the Miu Miu's Women's Tales series)		

== Accolades ==
=== Decoration ===
Knight of the National Order of Merit (Tunisia, 2016)

=== Awards ===
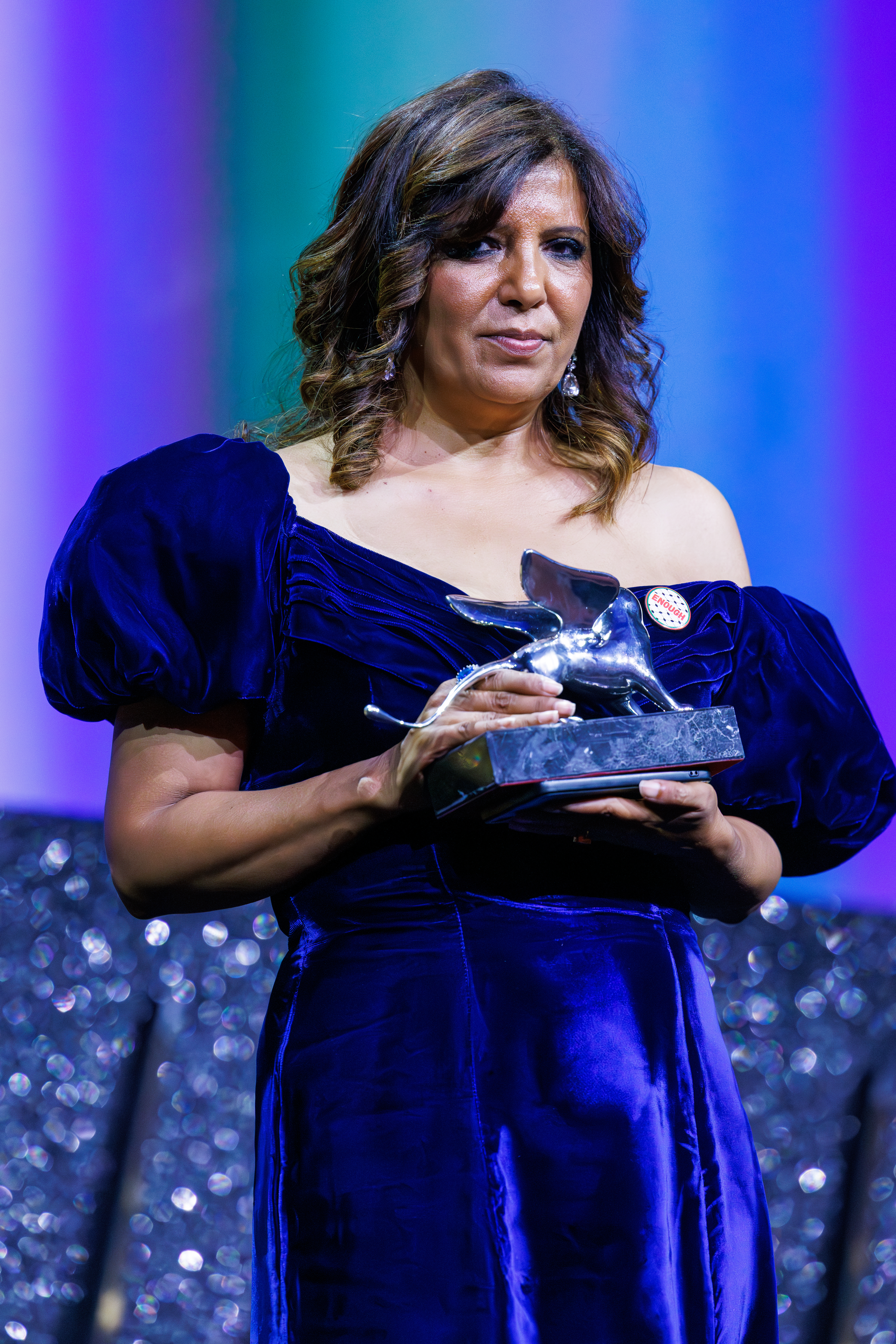
Ben Hania during the 82nd Venice International Film Festival

- Rencontres Films Femmes Méditerranée de Marseille 2013: Audience Award for Peau de colle
- Festival International du Film Francophone de Namur 2014: Bayard d'Or for Best First Work (Émile Cantillon Award) for Le Challat de Tunis
- Festival International du Film de Femmes de Salé 2014: Special Mention for Le Challat de Tunis
- Journées Cinématographiques de Carthage 2016: Tanit d'Or for Zaineb n'aime pas la neige
- Cannes Film Festival 2017: Best Sound Creation Award (initiated by La Semaine du Son and awarded for the first time) in the Un Certain Regard selection for La Belle et la Meute
- Festival du Cinéma Méditerranéen de Bruxelles 2017: Special Jury Prize for La Belle et la Meute
- Stockholm International Film Festival 2020: Best Screenplay for L'Homme qui a vendu sa peau
- Cannes Film Festival 2023: Citizenship Award, L'Œil d'Or (ex aequo), and Positive Cinema Award for Les Filles d'Olfa
- César Awards 2024: Best Documentary Film for Les Filles d'Olfa

=== Nominations and Selections ===
- Cannes Film Festival 2017: In competition in the Un Certain Regard selection for La Belle et la Meute
- Lumière Awards 2018: Best Francophone Film for La Belle et la Meute
- Academy Awards 2019: Preselection to represent Tunisia for Best Foreign Language Film for La Belle et la Meute
- Academy Awards 2021: Selection to represent Tunisia for Best Foreign Language Film for L'Homme qui a vendu sa peau
- Magritte Awards 2022: Best Foreign Film in Coproduction for L'Homme qui a vendu sa peau
- Cannes Film Festival 2023: Official selection, in competition for the Palme d'Or for Les Filles d'Olfa
