= Meryam Joobeur =

Canadian film director (born 2017)

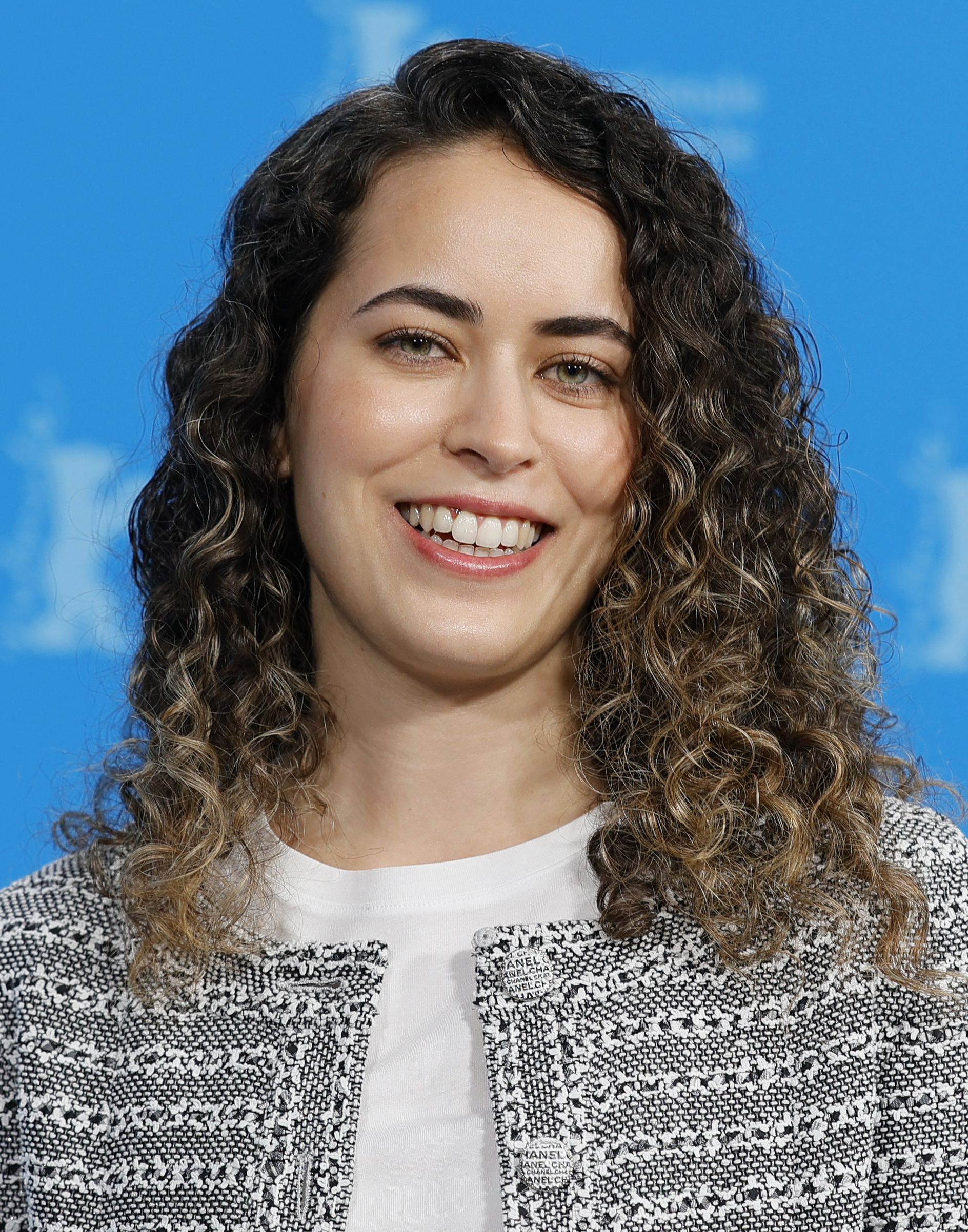
- Joobeur in 2024
- Citizenship: Tunisia, Canada
- Occupation(s): Screenwriter, Writer, Film director

Meryam Joobeur is a Tunisian Canadian film director. She is most noted for her 2018 short film Brotherhood (Ikhwène), which won the Toronto International Film Festival Award for Best Canadian Short Film at the 2018 Toronto International Film Festival and was nominated for the Academy Award for Best Live Action Short Film at the 92nd Academy Awards.

Born in the United States and raised there and in Tunisia, she moved to Montreal, Canada when she was 17. She is currently based there and is a graduate of the Cinema-Communications program at Dawson College and the Mel Hoppenheim School of Cinema at Concordia University. Prior to Brotherhood, she wrote and directed the short films Gods, Weeds and Revolutions (2012) and Born in the Maelstrom (2017).

Her debut feature film went into development in 2021, with the working title Motherhood. Joobeur participated in the Sundance Screenwriters' Lab at the 2021 Sundance Film Festival, where she was awarded the $10,000 Sundance Institute/NHK Award toward the film's production. The film premiered at the 74th Berlin International Film Festival under the title Who Do I Belong To (Mé el Aïn).
