= Mohamed Ben Attia =

Tunisian film director

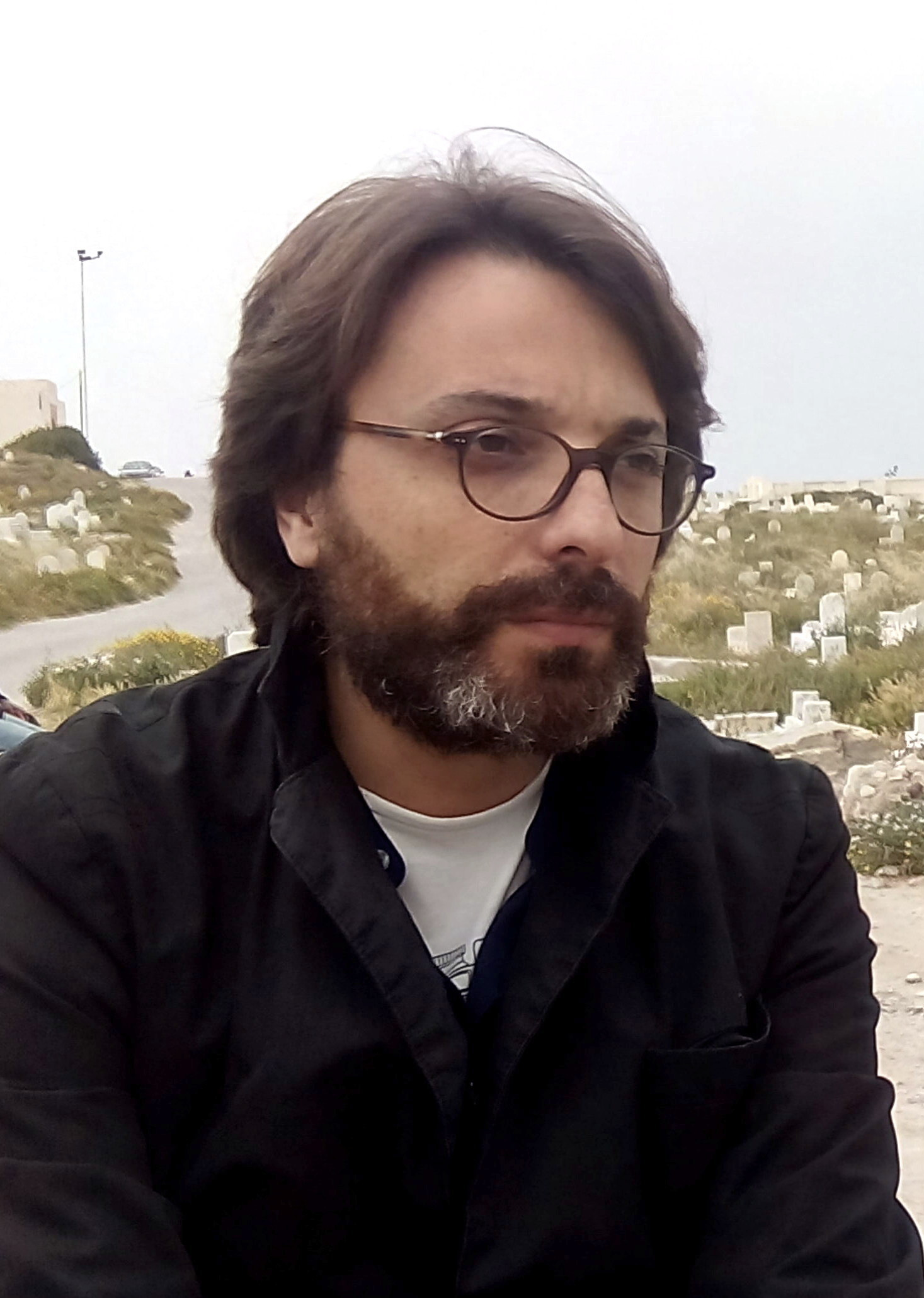
- Born: 5th of June,1976; Tunis Tunisia
- Citizenship: Tunisian
- Education: Institute of Higher Commercial Studies of Carthage, university of Valenciennes
- Occupations: Tunisian Director; Screen writer
- Years active: 2005 - Present
- Awards: Silver award Comme les autres, Best Berlinale premiere for Hedi, a wind of freedom, Diamond Valois (best film) at the Angoulême Francophone Film Festival for Hedi, a wind of freedom

Mohamed Ben Attia (born January 5, 1976) is a Tunisian film director and screenwriter.

== Early life and education ==
Born in 1976 in Tunis, Tunisia, he graduated from the Carthage High Commercial Studies Institute in 1998. Then, he projected a film career and tried to enter La Femis in Paris, which he was denied access after the third and final round of selections. A few years later, Ben Attia is holder of a diploma of specialized higher studies in audio-visual communication obtained at the university of Valenciennes.

== Career ==
After various jobs in audiovisual post-production, he was finally hired for twelve years in a commercial position and prospecting at a car dealership in Tunis.

Trained at the writing workshop Sud Écriture in Tunis, he began writing and directing several short fiction films, starting with Romantisme : deux comprimés matin et soir in 2005. His second short film : Comme les autres (Kif Lokhrim) was produced in 2006. After Mouja, unveiled at the Carthage Film Festival 2010 and selected at CinemAfrica 2011 in Stockholm, he directed Loi 76 (2011), his fourth short film, then Selma (2013).

He moved to feature film in 2016 with Hedi, a wind of freedom produced by Dora Bouchoucha (Nomadis Images) and co-produced by the Dardenne brothers (Les Films du Fleuve), convinced by his latest short film and script.

In 2018, he participated in the Cannes Film Festival where his film Dear Son is screened at the Directors' Fortnight.

== Filmography ==
- 2005 - Romantisme: deux comprimés matin et soir (short)
- 2006 - Comme les autres (short)
- 2010 - Mouja (short)
- 2011 - Loi 76 (short)
- 2013 - Selma (short)
- 2016 - Hedi
- 2018 - Dear Son
- 2023 - Behind the Mountains

== Awards ==
- 2006
  - Silver award at Fespaco for Comme les autres
  - Best Berlinale premiere at the Berlinale for Hedi, a wind of freedom.
  - Diamond Valois (best film) at the Angoulême Francophone Film Festival for Hedi, a wind of freedom.
  - City of Amiens Award (Best Director) and CCAS Award at the Amiens International Film Festival for Hedi, a wind of freedom.
  - Golden Athena award (best film) at the Athens International Film Festival for Hedi, a wind of freedom.
  - Domaine Clarence Dillon Jury Grand Prix and Erasmus + Jury Prize at the Independent International Film Festival in Bordeaux for Hedi, a wind of freedom.
- 2017
  - Prix Lumières for Best Francophone Film at the 22nd Annual Prix Lumières Ceremony for Hedi, a wind of freedom.
  - First Feature Award at the COLCOA French Film Festival for Hedi, a wind of freedom.
