= P.R2B =

French singer-songwriter, film director, and composer

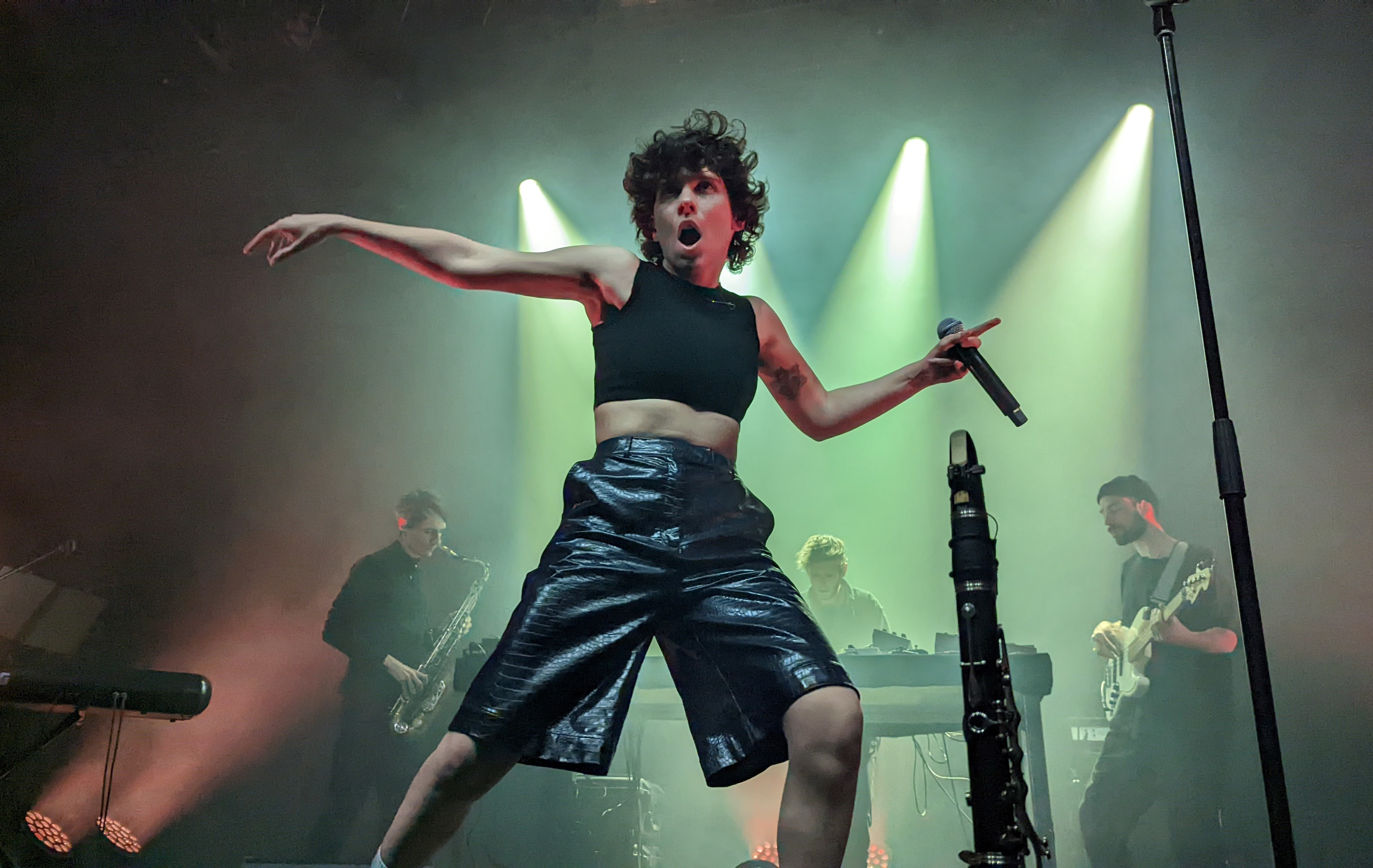
- P.R2B in concert at La Cigale, 23 March 2022

Background information
- Also known as: P.R2B
- Born: Pauline Rambeau de Baralon; 26 November 1990 (age 35); Saint-Doulchard, Cher, France
- Origin: France
- Genres: Chanson; Alternative
- Occupations: singer-songwriter; film director; composer
- Instruments: piano; clarinet; guitar
- Years active: 2020–present
- Label: Naïve Records
- Website: naiverecords.com/pr2b

P.R2B, born Pauline Rambeau de Baralon on 26 November 1990 in Saint-Doulchard, Cher, is a French singer-songwriter, film director, and composer. After studying film at La Fémis in Paris, where she graduated in 2016, she released her debut EP Des rêves in 2020, followed by her first album Rayons Gamma in 2021 to widespread critical acclaim from major French publications including Le Parisien, Télérama, and Libération. In addition to her music career, she has composed film scores for Kamal Lazraq's Les Meutes (2023) and Amélie Bonnin's Partir un jour (2025).

== Early life and education ==
Born in Saint-Doulchard in the Bourges region of central France, Pauline Rambeau de Baralon is the daughter of a professional guitarist and a mother who worked in a production facility in Centre-Val de Loire. She began studying clarinet at the municipal music school and later took up guitar and songwriting during high school.

Rambeau de Baralon studied cinema at a high school in Nevers before pursuing higher education at La Fémis, the National School of Visual Arts and Sound Techniques in Paris, where she earned a degree as a director in 2016. Her graduation short film, directed under the guidance of Laetitia Masson, is titled Bird's Lament, inspired by a composition by Moondog. The film follows a young woman studying clarinet who discovers the American composer's music in a record store and develops a deep passion for it. During the same period, she also studied at Cours Florent.

== Music career ==
=== Des rêves EP and early recognition (2020) ===
After graduating from La Fémis in 2016, Rambeau de Baralon developed her musical career under the stage name P.R2B. On 11 September 2020, she released her debut EP titled Des rêves on Naïve Records. Critics described the EP as blending hip-hop and French chanson with 1980s influences, particularly on the track "Le Film à l'envers".

The EP received positive reviews from French music critics, with Laura Marie of Les Inrockuptibles praising her work, and other reviewers calling it "unclassifiable and successful".

=== Rayons Gamma and breakthrough (2021–2022) ===
On 16 June 2021, P.R2B released the single "Mélancolie" from her debut album Rayons Gamma, which was released on 22 October 2021. The album received widespread critical acclaim. Le Parisien called it "a powerful debut album for the revelation P.R2B", while Télérama noted that "at 30 years old, P.R2B shakes up the music world". Libération described it as "a successful album that goes straight to the heart."

Following the album's release, P.R2B embarked on a tour across France, including a performance at the prestigious La Cigale venue in Paris on 23 March 2022. In 2022, she released the single "Metaverse".

=== Film composition and recent work (2023–present) ===
In addition to her recording career, P.R2B has composed music for cinema. She created the original score for Kamal Lazraq's film Les Meutes, which was released in 2023. In 2025, she composed the original score for Amélie Bonnin's film Partir un jour, which opened the 2025 Cannes Film Festival.

== Musical style ==
P.R2B's music has been described as intense and difficult to categorize, blending elements of hip-hop and traditional French chanson with influences from 1980s music. Her lyrics have been noted for their "very cinematic language", reflecting her background in film studies. She performs on multiple instruments including piano, clarinet, and guitar.

== Discography ==
=== Studio albums ===
Title
Rayons Gamma
Details
- Released: 22 October 2021
- Label: Naïve Records
- Format: CD, digital download
Track listing

No.	Title	Length
1.	"La chanson du bal"
2.	"Mélancolie"
3.	"Rayons Gamma"
4.	"Ma meilleure vie"
5.	"Lettre à P."
6.	"Mama"
7.	"Qui sont les coupables"
8.	"Punta cana"
9.	"La piscine"
10.	"Plus rien de bien"
11.	"Mon frère"
12.	"Vie de chienne"

=== Extended plays ===
Title
Des rêves
Details
- Released: 11 September 2020
- Label: Naïve Records
- Format: Digital download
Track listing

No.	Title	Length
1.	"Des rêves"
2.	"Dolce vita"
3.	"Le Film à l'envers"
4.	"La Chanson du bal"
5.	"Océan forever"
6.	"Le Beau mois d'août"

=== Singles ===
- "Mélancolie" (2021)Naïve
- "Metaverse" (2022)Naïve

== Filmography ==
=== As director ===
- Bird's Lament (2016) – short film

=== Film scores ===
Year	Film	Director	Notes
2023	Les Meutes	Kamal Lazraq	Original score
2025	Partir un jour	Amélie Bonnin	Original score; film opened 2025 Cannes Film Festival
