= Saïd Hamich Benlarbi =

Moroccan-French film producer and director

- سعيد حميش بن العربي
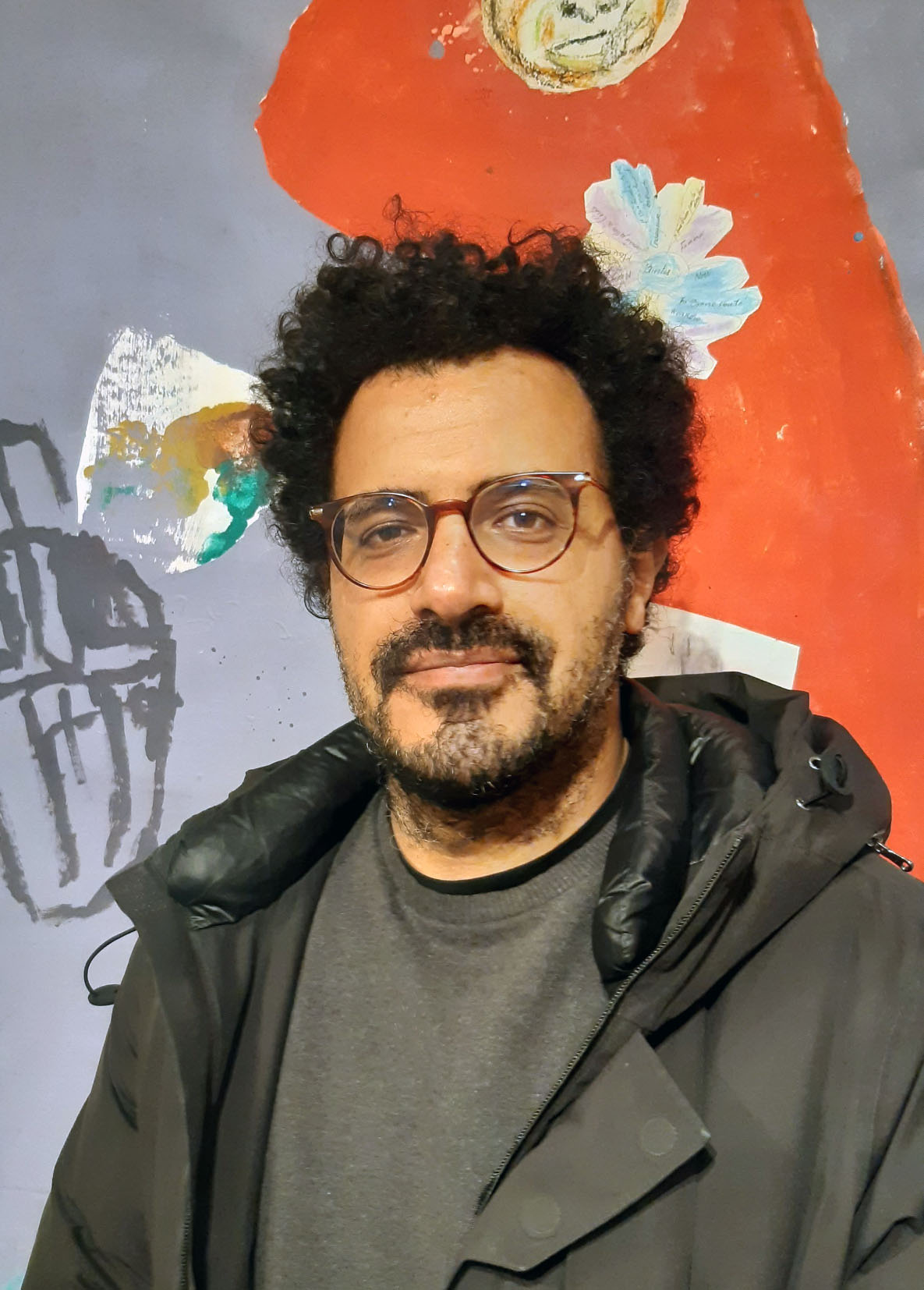
- Saïd Hamich Benlarbi in 2024
- Born: February 8, 1986 (age 40); Fez, Morocco
- Occupations: Film producer and director
- Notable work: Return to Bollene, Across the Sea (La Mer au loin)

Saïd Hamich Benlarbi (born 1986) is a Moroccan-French film producer, director, and screenwriter. He is known for producing the films Much Loved, Volubilis, Zanka Contact, and Hounds, and for directing Return to Bollene and Across the Sea.

== Biography ==
Saïd Hamich Benlarbi was born in Fez, Morocco in 1986.

He lived in Bollène, France, until he left for Paris after finishing his secondary education.

He graduated from La Fémis film school (department of film production), and won a producer scholarship from the Lagardère Foundation.

== Career ==
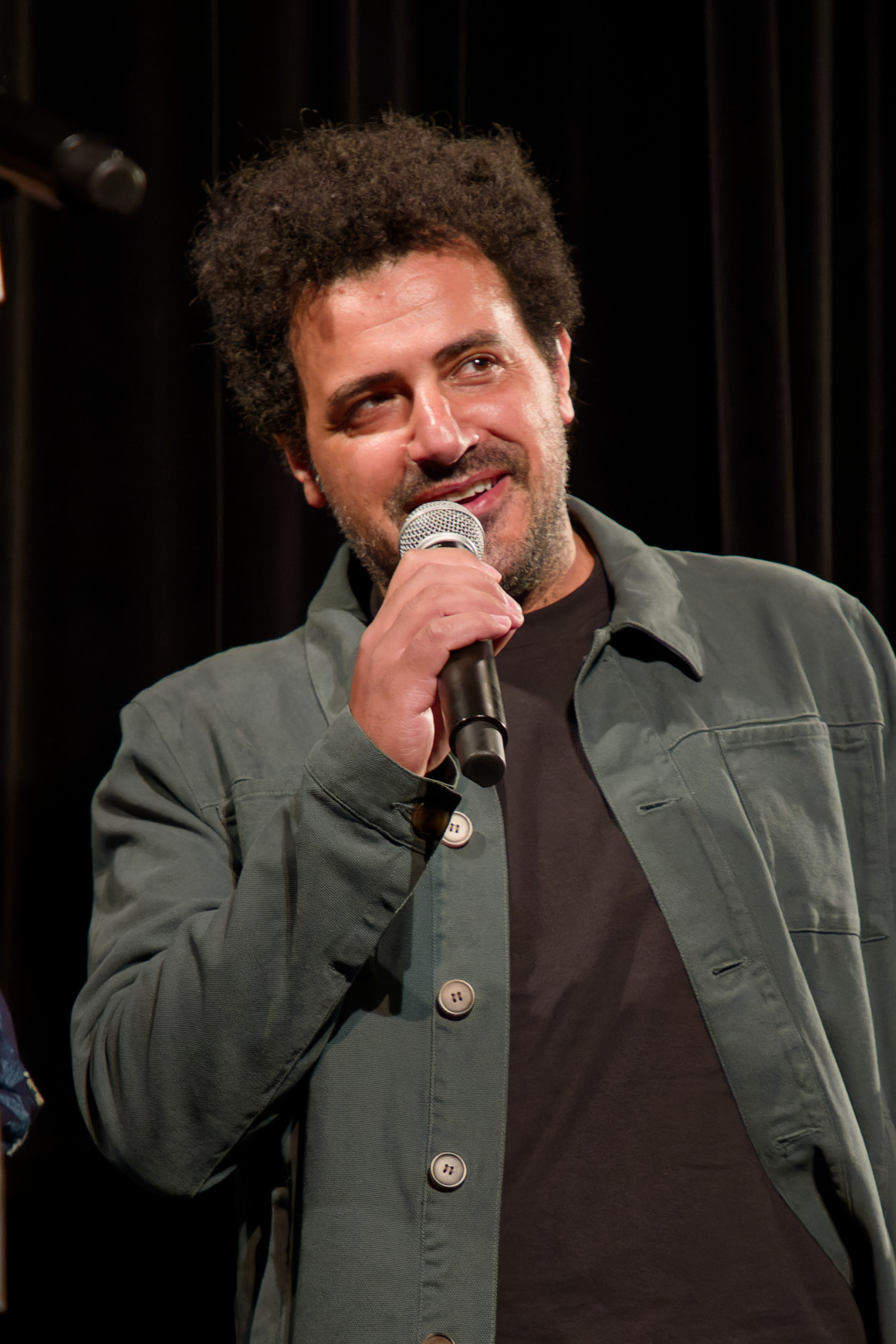
Saïd Hamich Benlarbi at the Across the Sea premiere at the 2024 Cannes Film Festival

Benlarbi has worked as director, producer, executive producer, screenwriter, line producer, and production manager.

He first worked as a producer for Barney Production, which he founded.

His debut feature film as director was Return to Bollene (Retour à Bollène), released in 2017, for which he also wrote the script as well as produced. It was a co-production of Barney Production and Mont Fleuri Production.

== Filmography ==
=== Producer and director ===
- 2017: Return to Bollene (Retour à Bollène)
- 2021: The Departure (Le Départ), short
- 2024: Across the Sea (La Mer au loin)
- 2026: In Search of the Green-Striped Bird (À la Recherche de l'Oiseau Gris aux Rayures Vertes)

=== Producer ===
- 2015: Much Loved by Nabil Ayouch
- 2017: Volubilis by Faouzi Bensaïdi
- 2017: Northern Wind (Vent du nord) by Walid Mattar
- 2020: Zanka Contact by Ismael El Iraki
- 2022: Le Marchand de sable by Steve Achiepo
- 2023: Deserts (Déserts) by Faouzi Bensaïdi
- 2023: Hounds (Les Meutes) by Kamal Lazraq
- 2023: Splendid Hotel by Pedro Aguilera
