= Partir un jour =

- Directed by: Amélie Bonnin
- Screenplay by: Amélie Bonnin; Dimitri Lucas
- Starring: Bastien Bouillon; Juliette Armanet; François Rollin; Lorella Cravotta
- Cinematography: David Cailley
- Edited by: Audrey Bauduin
- Music by: Thomas Krameyer
- Production company: Topshot Films
- Release date: 2021
- Running time: 24 minutes
- Country: France
- Language: French

Partir un jour is a 2021 French short film directed by Amélie Bonnin .

The director later adapted this film into a feature-length movie with the English title Leave One Day which premiered at the opening of the 2025 Cannes Film Festival.

== Synopsis ==
Julien has just published his first novel. As a soon-to-be father, he returns to Calvados to help his parents move since his father decided to retire. While doing the grocery shopping at the supermarket, he runs into Caroline, a childhood friend who is also pregnant and works as a cashier at the supermarket. They meet up that same evening for an outing to the municipal swimming pool. The unspoken words from the past take shape.

== Cast ==
- Bastien Bouillon as Julien Beguin
- Juliette Armanet as Caroline
- François Rollin as Julien's father
- Lorella Cravotta as Julien's mother
- Mélodie Lauret as Backup singer

== Songs ==
This short film is a musical, incorporating songs performed by the actors into the action, notably:

- Partir un jour by 2Be3, which gave its title to this film;
- L'Encre de tes yeux by Francis Cabrel;
- Bye bye by Ménélik, performed by Juliette Armanet and Bastien Bouillon;
- Tu m'oublieras by Régine Zylberberg, performed by Juliette Armanet and Bastien Bouillon.

== Awards ==
=== Honours ===
- Festival Off-Courts 2021: Audience Award for Region Normandy
- Clermont-Ferrand International Short Film Festival 2022: Audience Award
- Pantin Short Film Festival 2022: Best Actor Award for Bastien Bouillon
- César Awards 2023: Best Fiction Short Film

=== Nominations ===
- Festival International du Film Francophone de Namur 2021
