= Across the Sea =

Across the Sea may refer to:

- "Across the Sea" (Lost), an episode of the television series Lost
- "Across the Sea", a song by Weezer from the album Pinkerton
- Across the Sea (film), a 2024 film by Saïd Hamich Benlarbi

== See also ==
- Through My Window: Across the Sea, a 2023 sequel film to Through My Window
