= 77th Venice International Film Festival =

Italian film festival in 2020

- Official festival poster by Lorenzo Mattotti.
- Opening film: The Ties
- Closing film: You Came Back
- Location: Venice, Italy
- Founded: 1932
- Awards: Golden Lion: Nomadland
- Hosted by: Anna Foglietta
- Artistic director: Alberto Barbera
- No. of films: 66
- Festival date: 2 – 12 September 2020
- Website: labiennale.org/en/cinema

Venice Film Festival chronology
- 78th 76th

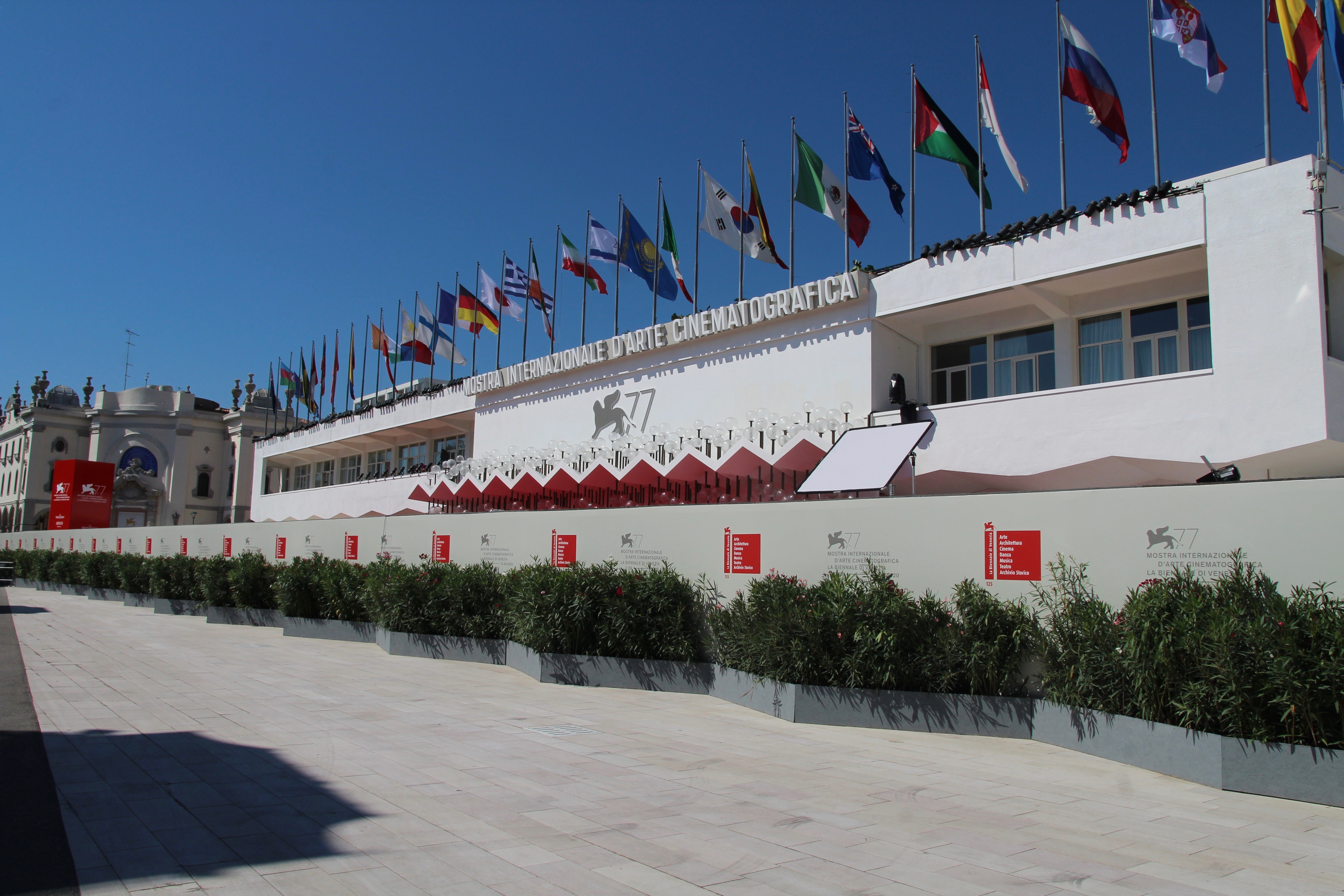
A barrier built in compliance with the safety directions to enforce social distancing blocks the main red carpet during the Festival

The 77th annual Venice International Film Festival was held from 2 to 12 September 2020, at Venice Lido in Italy. Albeit in a "more restrained format" due to the COVID-19 pandemic, the festival held all its screenings with public presence.

Australian actress Cate Blanchett was Jury President of the main competition. Italian actress Anna Foglietta hosted the opening and closing nights of the festival. The Golden Lion was awarded to Nomadland by Chloé Zhao.

The festival opened with The Ties by Daniele Luchetti, the first Italian film after 11 years to open the festival. And closed with You Came Back by Stefano Mordini.

== Juries ==
=== Main Competition (Venezia 77) ===
- Cate Blanchett, Australian actress and producer - Jury President
- Matt Dillon, American actor
- Veronika Franz, Austrian director and screenwriter
- Joanna Hogg, British director and screenwriter
- Nicola Lagioia, Italian author
- Christian Petzold, German director and screenwriter
- Ludivine Sagnier, French actress

=== Horizons (Orizzonti) ===
- Claire Denis, French filmmaker - Jury President
- Oskar Alegria, Spanish director
- Francesca Comencini, Italian director and screenwriter
- Katriel Schory, former Israel Film Fund topper
- Christine Vachon, American producer

=== Luigi De Laurentis Award for a Debut Film ===
- Claudio Giovannesi, Italian filmmaker - Jury President
- Rémi Bonhomme, Marrakech International Film Festival artistic director
- Dora Bouchoucha, Tunisian producer

=== Venice Virtual Reality ===
- Céline Tricart, American 3D and virtual reality expert
- Asif Kapadia, British director
- Hideo Kojima, Japanese video game author and pioneer

== Official Sections ==
=== In Competition ===
The following films were selected for the main competition:

English title	Original title	Director(s)	Production country
And Tomorrow the Entire World	Und morgen die ganze Welt	Julia von Heinz	Germany, France
Dear Comrades!	Дорогие товарищи!	Andrei Konchalovsky	Russia, France, Germany
The Disciple		Chaitanya Tamhane	India
In Between Dying	Səpələnmiş ölümlər arasında	Hilal Baydarov	Azerbaijan, Mexico, United States
Laila in Haifa		Amos Gitai	Israel, France
Lovers	Amants	Nicole Garcia	France
The Macaluso Sisters	Le sorelle Macaluso	Emma Dante	Italy
Miss Marx		Susanna Nicchiarelli	Italy, France, Belgium
Never Gonna Snow Again	Śniegu już nigdy nie będzie	Małgorzata Szumowska and Michał Englert	Poland, Germany
New Order	Nuevo Orden	Michel Franco	Mexico, France
Nomadland		Chloé Zhao	United States
Notturno		Gianfranco Rosi	Italy, France, Germany
Padrenostro		Claudio Noce	Italy
Pieces of a Woman		Kornél Mundruczó	Canada, Hungary
Quo Vadis, Aida?		Jasmila Žbanić	Bosnia and Herzegovina, Romania, Austria, Netherlands, Germany, Poland, France
Sun Children	خورشید	Majid Majidi	Iran
Wife of a Spy	スパイの妻	Kiyoshi Kurosawa	Japan
The World to Come		Mona Fastvold	United States

=== Out of Competition ===
The following films were selected to be screened out of competition:

English title	Original title	Director(s)	Production country
Fiction
Assandira		Salvatore Mereu	Italy
The Duke		Roger Michell	United Kingdom
The Human Voice	La voz humana	Pedro Almodóvar	Spain
Love After Love	第一炉香	Ann Hui	China
Mandibles	Mandibules	Quentin Dupieux	France, Belgium
Mosquito State	Komar	Filip Jan Rymsza	Poland, United States
Night in Paradise	낙원의 밤	Park Hoon-jung	South Korea, France
One Night in Miami...		Regina King	United States
Run Hide Fight		Kyle Rankin	United States
The Ties (opening film)	Lacci	Daniele Luchetti	Italy
You Came Back (closing film)	Lasciami andare	Stefano Mordini	Italy
Non Fiction
City Hall		Frederick Wiseman	United States
Crazy, Not Insane		Alex Gibney	United States
Final Account		Luke Holland	United Kingdom
Fiori, Fiori, Fiori (short)		Luca Guadagnino	Italy
I Am Greta		Nathan Grossmann	Sweden
Hopper/Welles		Orson Welles	United States
Molecole		Andrea Segre	Italy
Narciso on Vacation	Narciso em férias	Renato Terra and Ricardo Calil	Brazil
Paolo Conte, via con me		Giorgio Verdelli	Italy
Salvatore: Shoemaker of Dreams		Luca Guadagnino	Italy
Sportin' Life		Abel Ferrara	Italy
The Truth About La Dolce Vita	La verità su La Dolce Vita	Giuseppe Pedersoli	Italy

=== Special screenings ===
English title	Original title	Director(s)	Production country
30 Coins (episode 1)	30 Monedas	Álex de la Iglesia	Spain
Omelia contadina		Alice Rohrwacher and JR	Italy
Princesse Europe		Camille Lotteau	France

=== Orizzonti ===
==== In Competition ====
The following films were selected for the Horizons (Orizzonti) section:

English title	Original title	Director(s)	Production country
Apples	μήλα	Christos Nikou	Greece, Poland, Slovenia
The Best Is Yet to Come	不止不休	Wang Jing	China
Careless Crime	جنایت بی‌دقت	Shahram Mokri	Iran
The Furnace		Roderick Mackay	Australia
Gaza mon amour		Tarzan and Arab Nasser	Palestine, France, Germany, Qatar
Genus Pan	Lahi, Hayop	Lav Diaz	Philippines
Listen		Ana Rocha de Sousa	United Kingdom, Portugal
Mainstream		Gia Coppola	United States
The Man Who Sold His Skin	الرجل الذي باع ظهره	Kaouther Ben Hania	Tunisia, France, Germany, Belgium, Sweden
Milestone	मील पत्थर	Ivan Ayr	India
Nowhere Special		Uberto Pasolini	United Kingdom, Italy, Romania
Night of the Kings	La nuit des rois	Philippe Lacôte	Ivory Coast, France, Canada
The Predators	I predatori	Pietro Castellitto	Italy
The Third War	La troisième guerre	Giovanni Aloi	France
Tragic Jungle	Selva trágica	Yulene Olaizola	Mexico, France, Colombia
War and Peace	Guerra e pace	Massimo D'Anolfi, Martina Parenti	Italy, Switzerland
The Wasteland	دشت خاموش	Ahmad Bahrami	Iran
Yellow Cat	Zheltaya koshka	Adilkhan Yerzhanov	Kazakhstan, France
Zanka Contact		Ismael El Iraki	Morocco, France, Belgium

==== Short Films Competition ====
English title	Original title	Director(s)	Production country
Anita		Sushma Khadepaun	United States
BMM – Being My Mom		Jasmine Trinca	Italy
Entre tú y milagros		Mariana Saffon	Colombia, United States
À fleur de peau		Meriem Mesraoua	Qatar, Algeria, France
The Game	Das Spiel	Roman Hodel	Switzerland
Live in a Cloud Cuckoo Land	Mây nhưng không mưa	Nghĩa Vũ Minh & Minh Thy Phạm Hoàng	Vietnam
The Night Train	Nattåget	Jerry Carlsson	Sweden
Places	Miegamasis rajonas	Vytautas Katkus	Lithuania
The Shift		Laura Carreira	United Kingdom
Sogni al campo		Magda Guidi	Italy, France
Was Wahrscheinlich Passiert Wäre, Wäre Ich Nicht Zuhause		Willy Hans	Germany
Workshop		Judah Finnigan	New Zealand
Out of Competition
The Return Of Tragedy		Bertrand Mandico	France
Sì		Luca Ferri	Italy

=== Venice Classics ===
The following films were selected to be screened in the Venice Classics section, which this year is scheduled to be held at the Il Cinema Ritrovato Festival in Bologna, from 25 to 31 August:

English title	Original title	Director(s)	Production country
Le Cercle Rouge (1970)		Jean-Pierre Melville	France
Claudine (1974)		John Berry	United States
Goodfellas (1990)		Martin Scorsese	United States
The Last Supper (1976)	La última cena	Tomás Gutiérrez Alea	Cuba
Late Season (1966)	Utószezon	Zoltán Fábri	Hungary
Rickshaw Man (1958)	無法松の一生	Hiroshi Inagaki	Japan
Seduced and Abandoned (1964)	Sedotta e abbandonata	Pietro Germi	Italy
Serpico (1973)		Sidney Lumet	United States
Story of a Love Affair (1950)	Cronaca di un amore	Michelangelo Antonioni	Italy
An Unfinished Piece for Mechanical Piano (1977)	Неоконченная пьеса для механического пианино	Nikita Mikhalkov	Soviet Union
Vengeance Is Mine (1979)	復讐するは我にあり	Shōhei Imamura	Japan
The Young Girl (1975)	Den muso	Souleymane Cissé	Mali
You Only Live Once (1937)		Fritz Lang	United States

=== Biennale College - Cinema ===
The following films were selected for the Biennale College - Cinema section:

English Title	Original Title	Director(s)	Production Country
The Art of Return	El arte de volver	Pedro Collantes	Spain
Fucking with Nobody		Hannaleena Hauru	Finland

== Independent Sections ==
=== Venice International Critics' Week ===
==== In competition ====
The following films were selected for the 35th Venice International Critics' Week (Italian: Settimana Internazionale della Critica):

English title	Original title	Director(s)	Production country
50 or Two Whales Meet at the Beach	50 o dos ballenas se encuentran en la playa	Jorge Cuchi	Mexico
Bad Roads	Погані дороги	Natalya Vorozhbyt	Ukraine
The Flood Won't Come	Tvano nebus	Marat Sargsyan	Lithuania
Ghosts	Hayaletler	Azra Deniz Okyay	Turkey, Qatar
Enforcement	Shorta	Anders Ølholm and Frederik Louis Hviid	Denmark
Thou Shalt Not Hate	Non odiare	Mauro Mancini	Italy, Poland
Topside		Celine Held and Logan George	United States
Out of Competition
The Book of Vision (opening film)		Carlo S. Hintermann	Italy, United Kingdom, Belgium
The Rossellinis (closing film)		Alessandro Rossellini	Italy, Latvia

=== Giornate degli Autori ===
The following films were selected for the 17th edition of the Giornate degli Autori section:

English title	Original title	Director(s)	Production country
In Competition
200 Meters		Ameen Nayfeh	Palestine
Conference	Конференция	Ivan Tverdovskiy	Russia, Estonia, Italy, United Kingdom
Honey Cigar (opening film)	Cigare au miel	Kamir Aïnouz	France, Algeria
Mama		Li Dongmei	China
My Tender Matador	Tengo miedo torero	Rodrigo Sepúlveda	Chile, Argentina, Mexico
Oasis	Oaza	Ivan Ikić	Serbia, Slovenia, Netherlands, Bosnia and Herzegovina
Preparations to Be Together for an Unknown Period of Time	Felkészülés meghatározatlan ideig tartó együttlétre	Lili Horvát	Hungary
Residue		Merawi Gerima	United States
The Stonebreaker	Spaccapietre	Gianluca De Serio and Massimiliano De Serio	Italy, France, Belgium
The Whaler Boy	Kitoboy	Philipp Yuryev	Russia
Out of Competition
Saint-Narcisse (closing film)		Bruce LaBruce	Canada
Special Events
Extraliscio – Punk da balera		Elisabetta Sgarbi	Italy
Romantic Guide to Lost Places	Guida romantica a posti perduti	Giorgia Farina	Italy
The New Gospel	Das Neue Evangelium	Milo Rau	Germany, Switzerland, Italy
Samp		Flavia Mastrella, Antonio Rezza	Italy
Miu Miu Women's Tales
#19 Nightwalk		Małgorzata Szumowska	Italy, Poland

== Official Awards ==
=== In Competition ===
- Golden Lion: Nomadland by Chloé Zhao
- Grand Jury Prize: New Order by Michel Franco
- Silver Lion: Kiyoshi Kurosawa for Wife of a Spy
- Volpi Cup for Best Actress: Vanessa Kirby for Pieces of a Woman
- Volpi Cup for Best Actor: Pierfrancesco Favino for Padrenostro
- Best Screenplay: Chaitanya Tamhane for The Disciple
- Special Jury Prize: Dear Comrades! by Andrei Konchalovsky
- Marcello Mastroianni Award: Rouhollah Zamani for Sun Children

=== Horizons (Orizzonti) ===
- Best Film: The Wasteland by Ahmad Bahrami
- Best Director: Lav Diaz for Genus Pan
- Special Jury Prize: Listen by Ana Rocha de Sousa
- Best Actress: Khansa Batma for Zanka Contact
- Best Actor: Yahya Mahayni for The Man Who Sold His Skin
- Best Screenplay: The Predators by Pietro Castellitto
- Best Short Film: Entre tú y milagros by Mariana Saffon

=== Golden Lion for Lifetime Achievement ===
- Ann Hui
- Tilda Swinton
