= Northern Wind =

2017 Franc-Tunisian drama film

- French: Vent du nord
- Directed by: Walid Mattar
- Written by: Leyla Bouzid; Claude Le Pape; Walid Mattar
- Produced by: Saïd Hamich Benlarbi; Anthony Rey
- Starring: Philippe Rebbot; Mohamed Amine Hamzaoui; Kacey Mottet Klein; Corinne Masiero; Abir Bennani
- Cinematography: Martin Rit
- Edited by: Lilian Corbeille
- Music by: Malek Saied
- Production companies: Propaganda Production; Barney Production; Hélicotronc
- Distributed by: Hakka Distribution; KMBO
- Release dates: 14 December 2017 (France); 10 January 2018 (Tunisia)
- Running time: 89 minutes
- Countries: Tunisia; France; Belgium
- Languages: French; Arabic
- Box office: $197,676

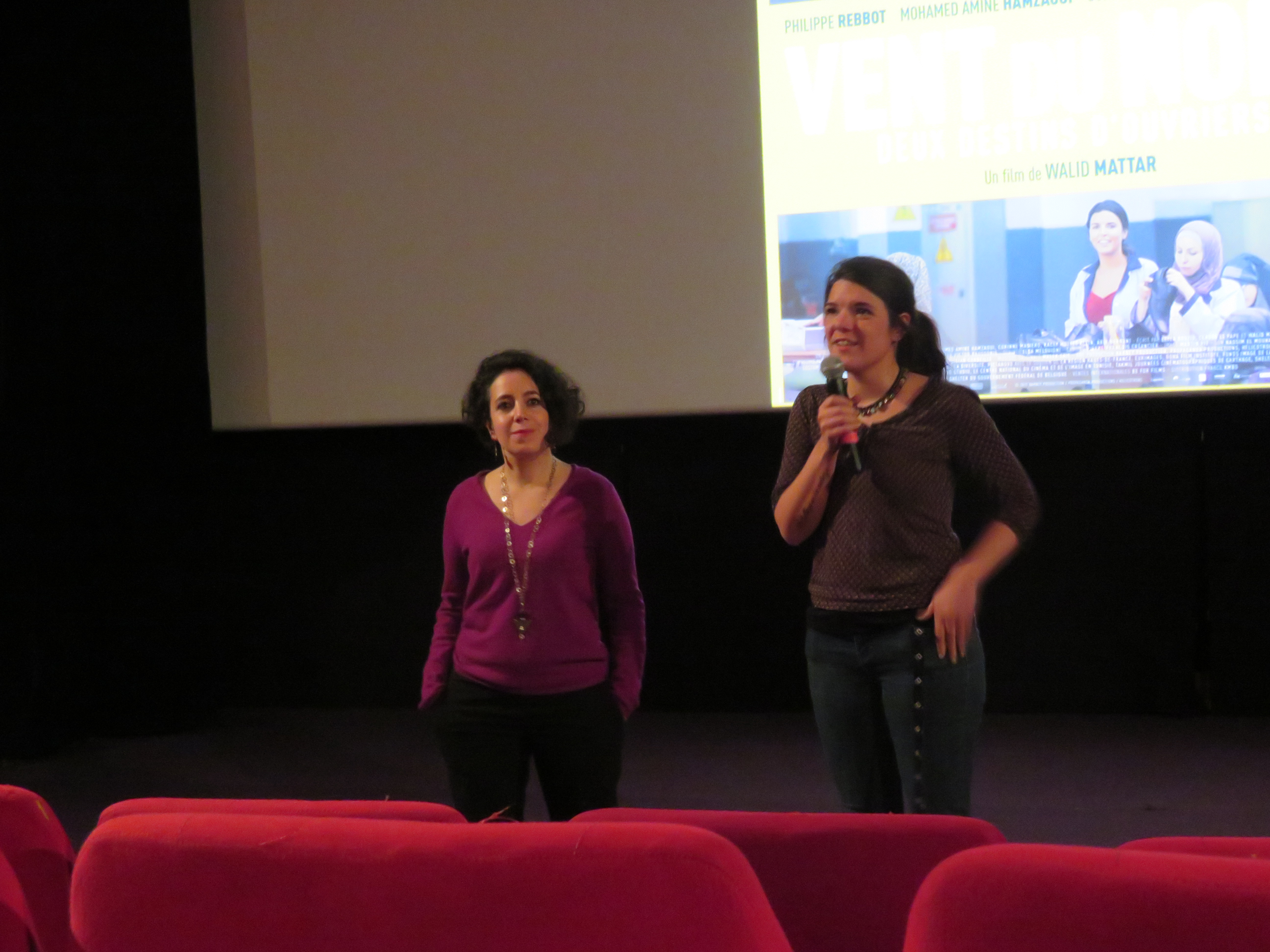
Director and screenwriter Leyla Bouzid presenting the film in Beauvais

Northern Wind (French: Vent du nord), is a 2017 Franco–Belgian–Tunisian family drama film directed by Walid Mattar and co-produced by Saïd Hamich and Anthony Rey. The film stars Philippe Rebbot with Mohamed Amine Hamzaoui, Kacey Mottet Klein, Corinne Masiero, and Abir Bennani in supporting roles. The film tells the story of Herve who moves Tunisia after his company in France was relocated, but faces lots of struggle.

The film was shot in France and Tunisia. It premiered on 14 December 2017 in France. The film received mixed reviews from critics. In 2017 at the Carthage Film Festival, the film was nominated for the Tanit d'Or for the Best Narrative Feature Film.

== Cast ==
- Philippe Rebbot as Hervé Lepoutre
- Mohamed Amine Hamzaoui as Foued Benslimane
- Kacey Mottet Klein as Vincent Lepoutre
- Corinne Masiero as Véronique Lepoutre
- Abir Bennani as Karima
- Khaled Brahmi as Chiheb
- Thierry Hancisse as Bernard
- Nissaf Ben Hafsia as Zina Ben Slimane
- Marianne Garcia as Femme du vestiaire
- François Godart as Patrick Lefevre
