= Paul Seul =

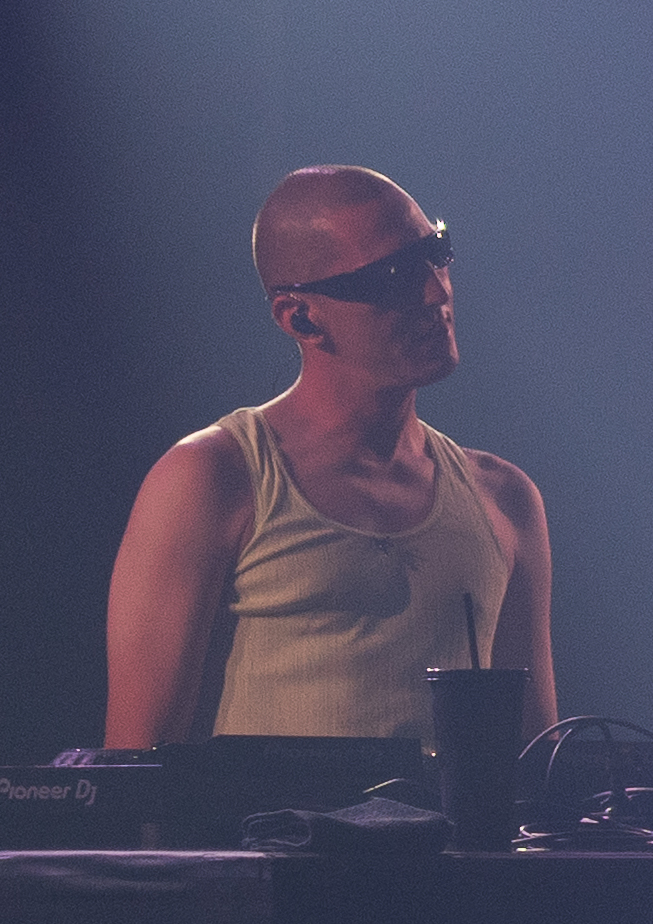

Background information
- Born: Paul Orzoni; France
- Genres: Gabber
- Occupations: Dj, producer
- Labels: Never Sleep, Casual Gabberz Records

Paul Seul is a French DJ and producer from Paris, co-founder of the collective and label Casual Gabberz. He has also produced a record under his real name, Paul Orzoni. In 2019 he formed the group Ascendant Vierge with Mathilde Fernandez.

== Biography ==
In the early 2010s, Paul Seul lived in the Netherlands. He worked for a communications agency. It was during his work with the client ID&T/Thunderdome, a Dutch electronic music festival, that Paul Seul became interested in the gabber musical style.

Mathilde Fernandez, whose music blends pop and gothic styles, requested a remix of her song Oubliette from the EP Hyperstition released in 2019. They then decided to continue this collaboration under the group name Ascendant Vierge. The name comes from their respective astrological signs, Virgo for Paul Seul and Gemini for Mathilde Fernandez.

In 2021, Paul Seul worked on a new solo EP titled Amoureuse, which began with the production of the track of the same name. Paul Seul sent it to another producer, Alberto from Gabber Eleganza, who encouraged him to work on a full project in the same style. He then added female vocals and pop elements, while blending his original influences, such as extreme electronic music (gabber, hardcore, etc.).

In addition to his solo career and work in groups, Paul Seul has participated in productions for Biffty & Hyacinthe.

== Discography ==
=== EPs ===
- 2018: Entretenir surveiller sécuriser (Casual Gabberz Records)
- 2020: Music in the Background (Casual Gabberz Records)
- 2021: Amoureuse (Never Sleep)
