= Zanka Contact =

- Directed by: Ismael El Iraki
- Written by: Ismaël el Iraki
- Produced by: Saïd Hamich Benlarbi
- Starring: Khansa Batma, Ahmed Hammoud, Saïd Bey
- Cinematography: Benjamin Rufi
- Edited by: Camille Mouton
- Music by: Alexandre Tartière, Neyl Nejjai
- Release date: 2020
- Running time: 120 minutes
- Countries: France, Morocco, Belgium
- Languages: Arabic, English

Zanka Contact is a 2020 Moroccan film directed by Ismael El Iraki. Described as a Wild at Heart-type love story with debts to Quentin Tarantino and Sergio Leone, the film was inspired by El Iraki's emotional journey and recovery after he found himself in the midst of the horrors of the 2015 Bataclan attacks in Paris. Following a screening at the 77th Venice International Film Festival where the film's lead actress, Moroccan singer Khansa Batma, won the Venice Orizzonti Award for Best Actress, the film went on to be selected for over thirty international festivals and won several awards through its festival run 2020 to 2022. Among them, Zanka Contact was awarded the Golden Tutankhamun Award for best feature film at the Luxor African Film Festival.

== Synopsis ==
Has-been rockstar Larsen Snake returns to his native Casablanca where he meets Rajae, a street girl with a golden voice. The two madly fall in love, but their passion is quickly overtaken by their past, and the wild couple takes to the desert to escape their demons.

== Release ==
El Iraki kept many of the cast and crew from his shorts (including actors Said Bey and Mourad Zaoui) on his first feature Zanka Contact, also known under the French release title Burning Casablanca. The movie premiered in 2020 in the official selection of the 77th Venice International Film Festival. The lead actress Khansa Batma won the Lion for Best ActressOrizzonti section.

Despite being premiered in the middle of the COVID-19 pandemic, the movie still obtained many selections in international festivals around the world : Busan International film festival, São Paulo International Film Festival or Mostra, Karlovy Vary International Film festival and many more. Shot on 35mm film in a CinemaScopeAnamorphic, Zanka Contact went on to win several international awards among which the Best Film Award at the Luxor African Film Festival . Zanka Contact was theatrically released in France on November 3, 2021, under the changed title Burning Casablanca. Director explained that the change was decided with the French distributor during the COVID-19 pandemic to avoid sounding like the French phrase "cas contact", which refers to someone who had close contact with a COVID-19 case. The film beneficiated from a wave of support from film critics in France and did well theatrically for a post-COVID release.

The Moroccan release took place on December 1, 2021, to critic and commercial acclaim. 10 months later in September 2022, Zanka Contact participated in the Tangier National Film Festival and won Best Film and Best Actress in a Supporting Role for actress Fatima Attif.

== Cast ==
- Khansa Batma
- Ahmed Hammoud
- Said Bey
- Mourad Zaoui

== Festivals and awards ==
- 77th Venice International Film Festival (Italy): Best Actress (Khansa Batma) Orizzonti section
- CINEMED Montpellier Mediterranean Film Festival (France): Jury Award
- London international film festival (U.K)
- Karlovy Vary International Film festival (Czek Republic) / canceled (COVID-19)
- Geneva International Film Festival (Switzerland)/ canceled (COVID-19)
- Luxor African Film Festival (Egypt) : Best Film
- Sarlat Film Festival (France)/ canceled (COVID-19)
- Soundscreen International Film Festival (Italy): Best Music
- Linea d’Ombra Festival (Italy)/ canceled (COVID-19)
- São Paulo International Film Festival (Brazil)
- Busan International Film Festival (South Korea)
- Annonay International First Film Festival (France) : Best Film
- Music & Cinema Marseille : Best Director (Ismael El Iraki)
- Shanghai International Film Festival (China)
- Durban International Film Festival (South Africa)
- Gabes International Film Festival (Tunisia)
- Tetuan International Film Festival (Morocco)
- Tangier National Film Festival (Morocco): Best Film / Best Actress in a Supporting Role (Fatima Attif)
