= Hyacinthe (rapper) =

French rapper and singer

- Also known as: Hyahya
- Born: France
- Genres: French hip-hop, gabber
- Occupation: Rapper
- Labels: DFHDGB, Chapter Two Records/Wagram, ULTRATECHNIQUE Records

Hyacinthe is a French rapper and singer.

== Biography ==
His first mixtape, Des hauts, des bas et des strings, was released in 2012. It was followed in 2013 by Sur la route de l’amour and then in 2015 by the album SLRA2: Mémoire de mes putains tristes, which resulted in a positive review in Libération.

Hyacinthe made his comeback in 2017 with Sur ma vie. The track is identified by online media as part of the "rap gabber" genre due to its use of heavy kicks and his collaboration with the Parisian collective Casual Gabberz. Upon its release, it was accompanied by a music video directed by Anna Cazenave Cambet, who won the Queer Palm at Cannes in 2016 for her short film Gabber Lover. This was followed by the singles La Nuit les étoiles featuring rapper Jok'Air and Sarah, which announced the album of the same name, released on September 29, 2017, by Chapter Two Records. He considers this album to be the "most experimental" of his career.

Hyacinthe performed several concerts as the opening act for the band Columbine, participated in the Francofolies de La Rochelle festival, and performed at the Bars en Trans festival.

His second album, Rave, preceded by the singles Ultratechnique, Rave, and Nuit noire, was released on April 12, 2019. It features rapper Foda C from Columbine, the group The Pirouettes, and singer P.R2B. Once again, it is praised by the press, with Les Inrockuptibles writing: "The black and nihilistic failure statement found in his previous tracks has given way to a glimmer of hope here."

In December 2019 he created his label ULTRATECHNIQUE and released the single Mazda before announcing the playlist WIP, where he published numerous singles until autumn 2020. On October 23, 2020, the mixtape WIP Tape was released, featuring many unreleased tracks. Le Figaro, which included the single "Noces" in one of its weekly playlists, described Hyacinthe's songs as "intoxicating refrains".

In 2021 Hyacinthe released the EP Momentum, preceded by the singles Juice WRLD, Cœur chromé (featuring Chanje), À demain peut-être, and SACEM (featuring Spider ZED).

== Discography ==
=== Studio albums ===
- 2017: Sarah
- 2019: RAVE

=== Mixtapes ===
- 2012: Des hauts, des bas, des strings
- 2013: Sur la route de l'amour
- 2015: SLRA 2 : Mémoire de mes putains tristes
- 2020: WIP Tape

=== EPs ===
- 2021: Momentum
- 2023: c'était pas le bruit du vent c'était juste mon souffle

=== Collaborations ===
- 2013: Hyacinthe x L.O.A.S : Ne pleurez pas mademoiselle
- 2018: Hyacinthe x Casual Gabberz : La Baise

=== Playlists ===
- 2020: WIP
