= Fucking with Nobody =

2020 comedy film

- Film poster
- Directed by: Hannaleena Hauru
- Screenplay by: Hannaleena Hauru; Lasse Poser
- Produced by: Emilia Haukka; Jussi Rantamäki
- Starring: Hannaleena Hauru; Lasse Poser; Samuel Kujala; Pietu Wikström; Sara Melleri; Hanna-Kaisa Tiainen
- Production company: Aamu Film Company
- Release date: September 8, 2020 (Venice Film Festival)
- Running time: 102 min.
- Country: Finland
- Language: Finnish

Fucking with Nobody is a 2020 Finnish comedy film directed by Hannaleena Hauru from a screenplay by Hauru and Lasse Poser. The film stars Hannaleena Hauru, Lasse Poser, Samuel Kujala, Pietu Wikström, Sara Melleri, Hanna-Kaisa Tiainen, Jussi Lankoski, Anna Kuusamo and Tanja Heinänen.

The film has its worldwide premiere at the 77th Venice International Film Festival on September 8, 2020, as part of the Biennale College Cinema program.

== Cast ==
The cast include:

- Hannaleena Hauru
- Lasse Poser
- Samuel Kujala
- Pietu Wikström
- Sara Melleri
- Hanna-Kaisa Tiainen
- Jussi Lankoski
- Anna Kuusamo
- Tanja Heinänen

== Release ==
On February 12, 2021 it was announced that the film would have its U.S. premiere at SXSW.
