= Final Account (film) =

2020 documentary film

- Theatrical release poster
- Directed by: Luke Holland
- Produced by: Luke Holland; John Battsek; Riete Oord
- Cinematography: Luke Holland
- Edited by: Stefan Ronowicz
- Production companies: Participant; ZEF Productions; Passion Pictures
- Distributed by: Focus Features (United States); Universal Pictures (United Kingdom)
- Release dates: September 2, 2020 (Venice); May 21, 2021 (United States); December 3, 2021 (United Kingdom)
- Running time: 94 minutes
- Countries: United States; United Kingdom
- Language: German
- Box office: $353,077

Final Account is a 2020 German-language documentary film directed and produced by Luke Holland, who died shortly after post-production was completed on June 10, 2020. The film follows the last living generation of German participants in Adolf Hitler's Third Reich.

Final Account premiered at the 77th Venice International Film Festival on September 2, 2020. It was released on May 21, 2021, by Focus Features.

== Production ==
Beginning in 2008, Luke Holland conducted over 300 interviews with witnesses, guards, farmers, soldiers and participants of Adolf Hitler's Third Reich. Holland began working on the project after discovering his grandparents were murdered in a concentration camp, and his mother had fled Austria before the Germans arrived. Holland knew that many interviewees were skeptical and hesitant to go on camera because they did not want to share what they knew or were responsible for. In June 2020, Holland died after the film had cleared post-production.

== Release ==
The film had its world premiere at the 77th Venice International Film Festival on September 2, 2020. In January 2021, Focus Features acquired distribution rights to the film, and set it for a May 21, 2021, release. The film was released in the United Kingdom on 3 December 2021.

== Reception ==
The review aggregator Rotten Tomatoes gives the film a 93% approval rating, based on 71 reviews, with an average rating of 7.9/10. The website's consensus reads, "Final Account falls shy of the definitive statement suggested by its title, but the belated reckoning on display remains chillingly valuable viewing." According to Metacritic, which sampled 17 critics and calculated a weighted average score of 76 out of 100, the film received "generally favorable" reviews.
