= Mélodie Lauret =

French singer-songwriter (born 1999)

- Born: 3 November 1999 (age 26)
- Occupations: Singer-songwriter, musician, actor

Mélodie Lauret (born 3 November 1999) is a French singer-songwriter and actor.

== Biography ==
As a child prodigy, Mélodie Lauret wrote and performed their first play at age 17, J'irai danser tes 20 ans, exploring themes of love and identity.

Their first EP, 23 h 28, was released in 2020. Mélodie Lauret then presented theatrical performances blending theater and song, notably at Théâtre Les Déchargeurs and at La Boule Noire.

Their second EP, Doucement, was released in 2021, followed by their first album, Le moment présent, in 2022, co-written with Dani Terreur.

Mélodie Lauret is non-binary. Questions around gender and sexuality permeate their work.

These subjects are also addressed in the 2022 play Plutôt vomir que faillir by Rébecca Chaillon, in which Mélodie Lauret performs.

== Discography ==
2019: 23h28 (Sony Music / Rca Group)
1. 23h28
2. elles avaient 15 ans
3. quand j'entends les gens
4. minuit quelque part
5. tes cheveux
2021: doucement (Sony Music / Rca Group)
1. Doucement
2. Il fait chaud, c'est glacial
3. Elle l'aura
4. À quoi tu penses quand tu m'adores ?
5. Il fait chaud, c'est glacial (vikken remix)
2022: Le moment présent (Sony Music / Rca Group)
1. Je t'offre tout ce qu'il me reste
2. Pinocchio
3. Le moment présent
4. À cause de moi
5. Star
6. Coups de coups de foudre
7. Hallebardes
8. Ma cabane
9. J'en fais mon arme
10. Quand j'entends les gens
11. J'avance avec

== Theatre ==
- 2018: J'irai danser tes 20 ans by Mélodie Lauret, Théâtre Darius Milhaud
- 2022: Plutôt vomir que faillir by Rébecca Chaillon, MC93 Bobigny, Nouveau Théâtre de Besançon, Théâtre de Gennevilliers, Théâtre public de Montreuil, Théâtre de Vidy and on tour

== Filmography ==
- 2021: Partir un jour by Amélie Bonnin
- 2022: Youssou et Malek by Simon Frenay

=== Television ===
- 2017: Les Goudous
- 2017: Une famille formidable, season 14, episodes 3 and 4: Mélodie

=== Video ===
- 2018 : A peu près by Pomme
