= The Wasteland (2020 film) =

- Film poster
- Directed by: Ahmad Bahrami
- Written by: Ahmad Bahrami
- Produced by: Saeed Bashiri
- Starring: Ali Bagheri; Farrokh Nemati; Mahdie Nassaj
- Cinematography: Masud Amini Tirani
- Edited by: Sara Yavari
- Music by: Foad Ghahremani
- Release date: September 3, 2020 (VIFF)
- Running time: 102 minutes
- Country: Iran
- Language: Persian

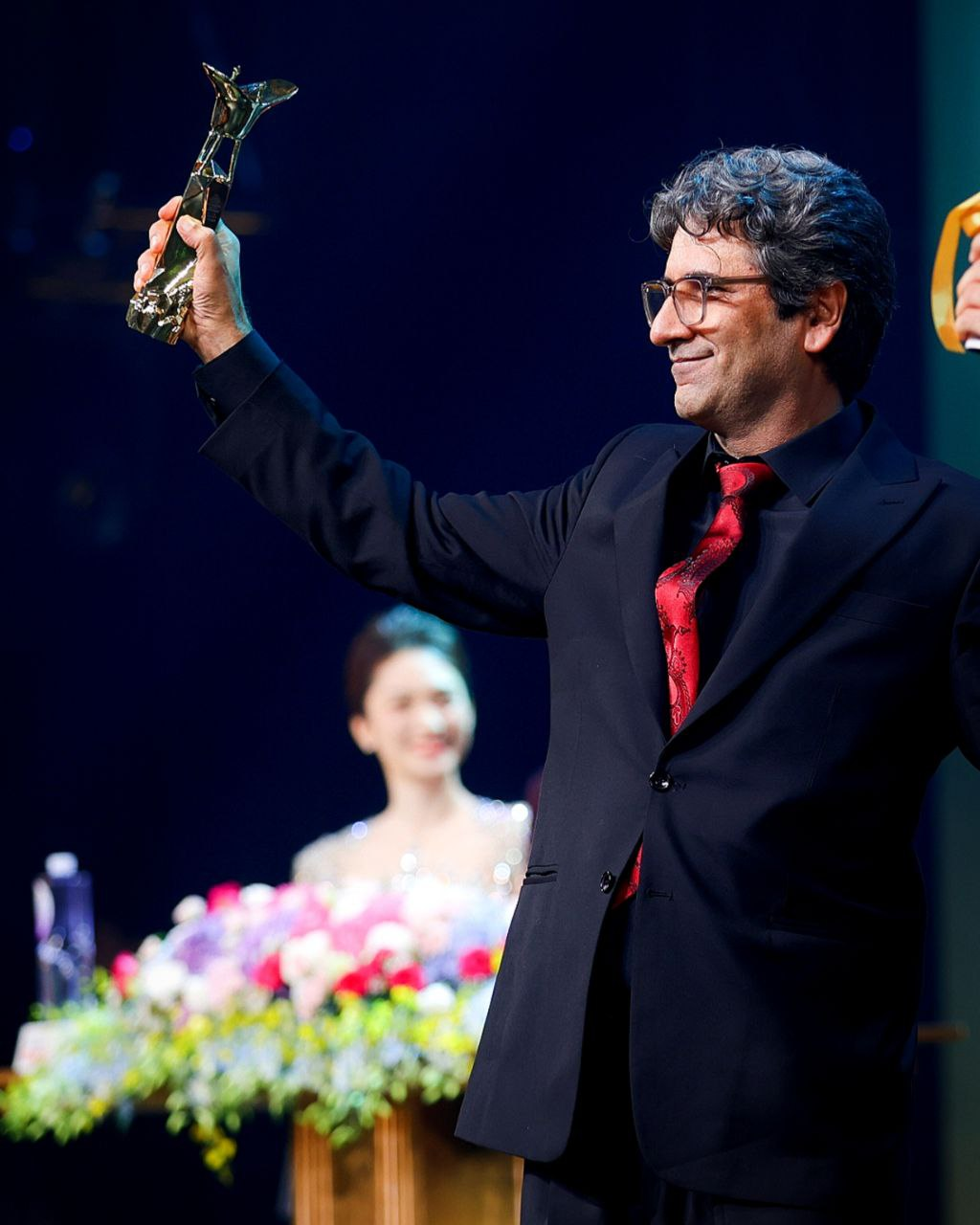
The Wasteman won Award at the 26th Shanghai Film Festival in 2024 (Image:Ahmad Bahrami)

The Wasteland (Persian: دشت خاموش, romanized: Dashte khamoush) is a 2020 Iranian drama film directed and written by Ahmad Bahrami. the film premiered on September 3, 2020, at the 77th Venice International Film Festival, where it won the Orizzonti Award.‌Prize 2021 of the international jury at the Festival Nouvelles Images Persanes in Vitré (France)

== Synopsis ==
A remote brick manufacture factory produces bricks in an ancient way. Many families with different ethnicities work in the factory and the boss seems to hold the key to solving their problems. Forty-year-old Lotfollah (Ali Bagheri), who has been born on-site, is the factory supervisor and acts as go-between for the workers and the boss. Boss (Farrokh Nemati) has Lotfollah gather all the workers in front of his office. He wants to talk to them about the shutdown of the factory. All matters now to Lotfollah is to keep Sarvar (Mahdie Nassaj) unharmed, the woman he has been in love with for a long time.

== Cast ==
- Ali Bagheri as Lotfollah
- Farrokh Nemati as Lotfollah's Boss
- Mahdie Nassaj as Sarvar
- Sepehr Sepi as Pianist
- Touraj Alvand
- Majid Farhang
- Naser Alaghemandan
- Narges Amini
- Mohsen Yeganeh
- Razie Irani
- Shaghayegh Aghazadeh
- Mahtab Khosh Manesh
- Ahoura Bahrami
- Parsa Sobhani
- Arsha Sobhani
- Barsa Bahrami
- Mina Sarghare

== Reception ==
=== Awards and nominations ===
Year	Award	Category	Recipient	Result
2021	Art Film Festival	Best Film – Blue Angel	Ahmad Bahrami	Nominated
2021	Nouvelles Images Persanes French Vitré Festival	Prize 2021 - International jury	Ahmad Bahrami	Won
2021	Asia Film Awards	Best New Director	Ahmad Bahrami	Nominated
2021	Asia Film Awards	Best Cinematography	Masoud Amini Tirani	Won
2021	Bogotá International Film Festival	Best Film – Premio Radiónica de la juventud	Ahmad Bahrami	Won
2020	Venice International Film Festival	Orizzonti	Ahmad Bahrami	Won
2022	Iranian Cinema Directors' Great Celebration	Best New Film Director	Ahmad Bahrami	Nominated
2022	Iran's Film Critics and Writers Association	Best Creativity and Talent (first filmmakers)	Ahmad Bahrami	Nominated
