= Ana Rocha de Sousa =

French-Portuguese director, screenwriter and actress

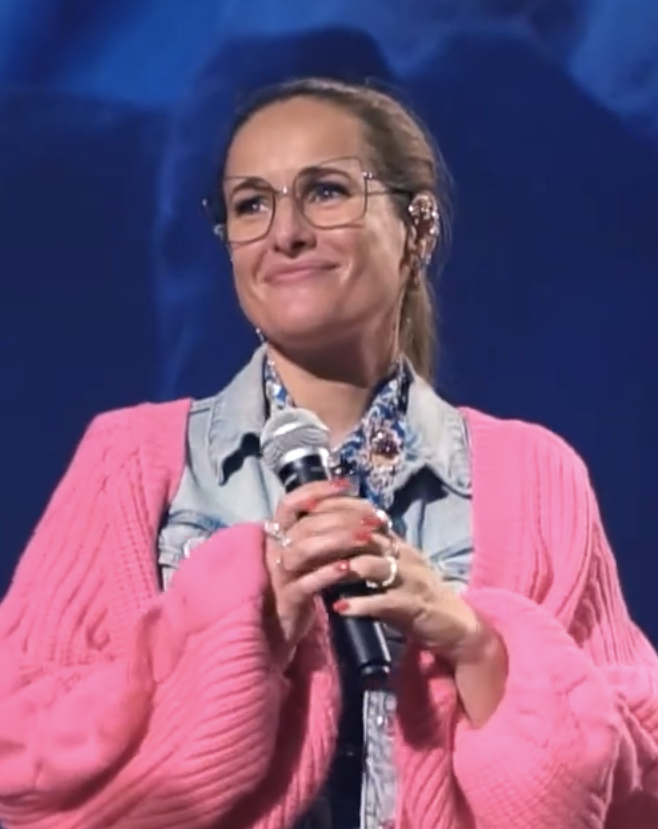
- Rocha de Sousa in 2020
- Born: 25 October 1978 (age 47); Lisbon, Portugal
- Occupations: Actress; Filmmaker

Ana Rocha de Sousa (born 25 October 1978) is a Portuguese director, screenwriter and actress.

== Life and career ==
Born in Lisbon, Rocha de Sousa graduated in Fine Arts of the University of Lisbon. She made her film debut in 1991, in João Botelho's No Dia dos Meus Anos, but became popular thanks to television, starting from her leading role in the 1997 RTP1 TV-series Riscos. She then moved to London, where she studied direction at the London Film School.

As a director, after some shorts and a documentary about Adriano Correia de Oliveira, Rocha de Sousa made her feature film debut in 2020, with Listen; the film premiered into the Horizons section at the 77th edition of the Venice Film Festival, winning the Lion of the Future Award for a Debut Film and the section's special jury prize.
