= Listen (2020 film) =

2020 film

- Film poster
- Directed by: Ana Rocha de Sousa
- Starring: Lúcia Moniz; Sophia Myles
- Release dates: 7 September 2020 (Venice); 22 October 2020 (Portugal)
- Running time: 73 minutes
- Country: Portugal
- Languages: Portuguese; English

Listen is a 2020 Portuguese drama film written and directed by Ana Rocha de Sousa that stars Lúcia Moniz and Sophia Myles. The film premiered in the Horizon section of the 77th Venice International Film Festival, in which it won the Special Jury Prize. It was selected as the Portuguese entry for the Best International Feature Film at the 93rd Academy Awards. However, in December 2020 the film was disqualified, as more than half of its dialogue was in English. It won 3 Sophia Awards in 2021.

== Plot ==
A Portuguese couple living in London have their three children taken away from them by social services, and they fight to get them back.

== Cast ==
- Lúcia Moniz as Bela
- Sophia Myles as Ann Payne
- Ruben Garcia as Jota
- Kiran Sonia Sawar as Anjali
- James Felner as Diego
- Brian Bovell as Social services officer
- Maisie Sly as Lu
- Susanna Cappellaro as Teacher
- Jon Rumney as Shop owner

== See also ==
- List of submissions to the 93rd Academy Awards for Best International Feature Film
- List of Portuguese submissions for the Academy Award for Best International Feature Film
