= Return to Bollene =

Film

- Directed by: Saïd Hamich
- Starring: Anas El Baz
- Release dates: 2017 (festivals); May 30, 2018
- Running time: 67 minutes
- Countries: France; Morocco

Return to Bollene (French: Retour à Bollène) is a 2017 Franco-Moroccan film written, directed, and co-produced by Moroccan-French filmmaker Saïd Hamich Benlarbi.

== Synopsis ==
The film follows the story of Nassim, a 30-year-old man who returns to his hometown of Bollène, only to find it in a state of devastation under the rule of the League of the South, and a strained relationship with his father. Nassim, who now resides in Abu Dhabi with his American fiancée, confronts the challenges of his past and present as he navigates through the social and political issues of his hometown.

== Cast ==
The cast includes:

- Anas El Baz as Nassim
- Kate Colebrook as Elizabeth
- Saïd Benchnafa as Mouss
- Bénédicte-Lala Ernoult as Hajjar
- Jamila Charik as Nassim's mother
- Abdelhak Saleh as Nassim's father
- Lamia Menioui as Asma

== Production ==
Return to Bollene was directed by Moroccan-French filmmaker Saïd Hamich Benlarbi. He also wrote the script, and the film was co-produced by his company Barney Production with Mont Fleuri Production.

== Themes ==
Return to Bollene explores themes of cultural identity, societal change, and the complexities of familial relationships in the face of political turmoil.

== Release ==
Return to Bollene was screened at the following film festivals and events:

- Bordeaux International Independent Film Festival (2017)
- Cinemed: Mediterranean Cinema's Festival of Montpellier (2017)
- Sarlat Film Festival (2018)
- Festival Itinérance of Alès (2018)
- Festival del Cinema Francese de Firenze, Florence, Italy
- Manarat Film Festival
- Institut français de Amman – Special screening
- Institut français d’Alger – Special screening
- Tübingen Stuttgart Festival International du Film Francophone

It was released in French cinemas on 30 May 2018.

== Critical reception ==
Upon its release, Return to Bollene received mostly positive reviews.

Richard Brody of The New Yorker wrote that the film "is a rare fusion of societal analysis and personal experience, of the complex and agonized intertwining of private and public lives, domestic and civic forces".

Julien Gester from Libération highlighted the film's unique perspective on societal issues. However, Pierre Vavasseur from Le Parisien expressed some disappointment in the depth of the narrative.

== Awards and nominations ==
In 2017, Return to Bollene was honoured with the Contrabandes Prize at the Bordeaux International Independent Film Festival.

It was nominated for the Louis Delluc Prize for a first feature film in 2019, and received a Special Mention at the Festival del Cinema Francese de Firenze (Festival France Odeon 2018).
