= Ascendant Vierge =

French electronic music duo

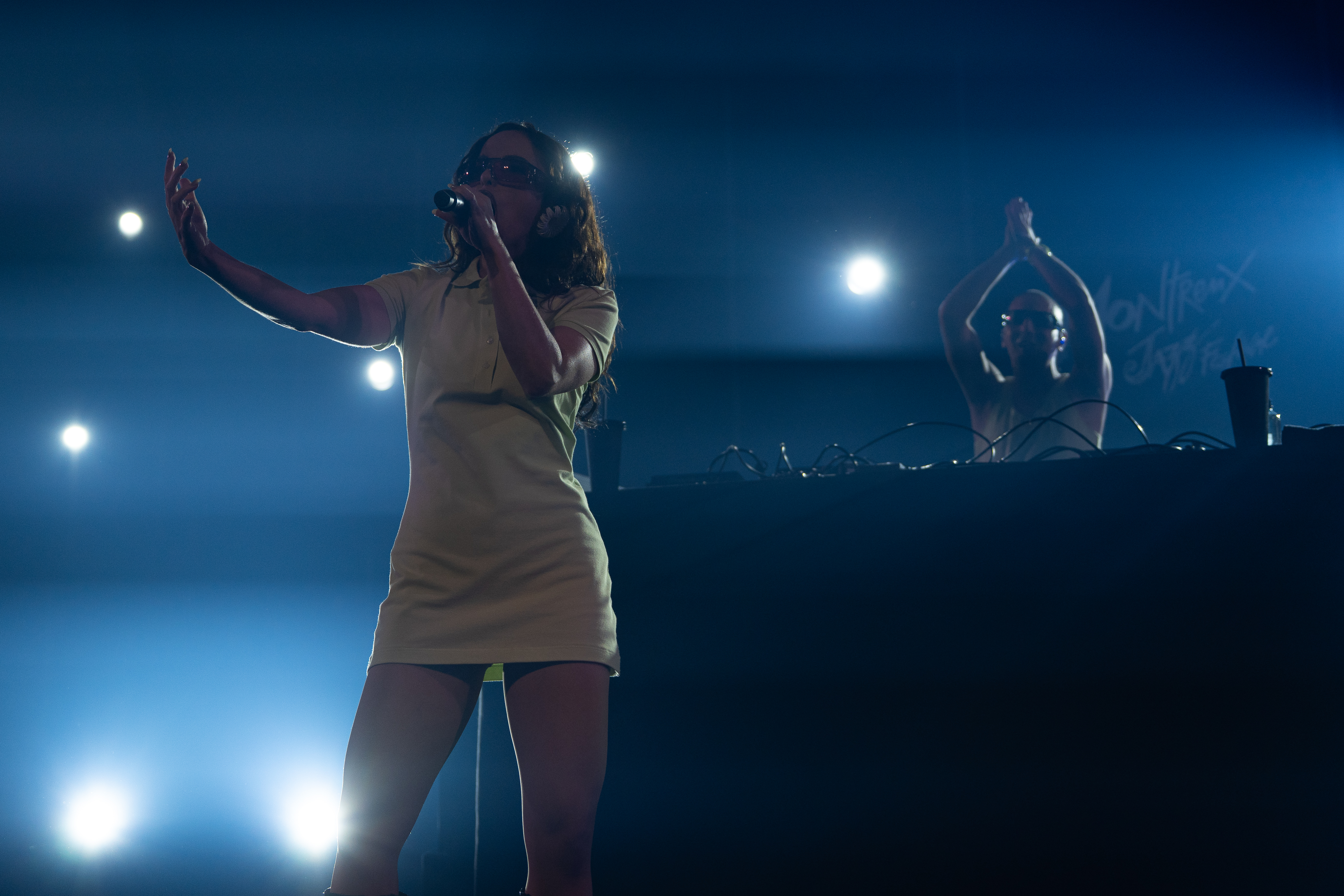

Background information
- Origin: France
- Genres: Techno hardcore, gabberpop, hyperpop
- Years active: 2019–present
- Members: Mathilde Fernandez; Paul Seul
- Website: ascendantvierge.com

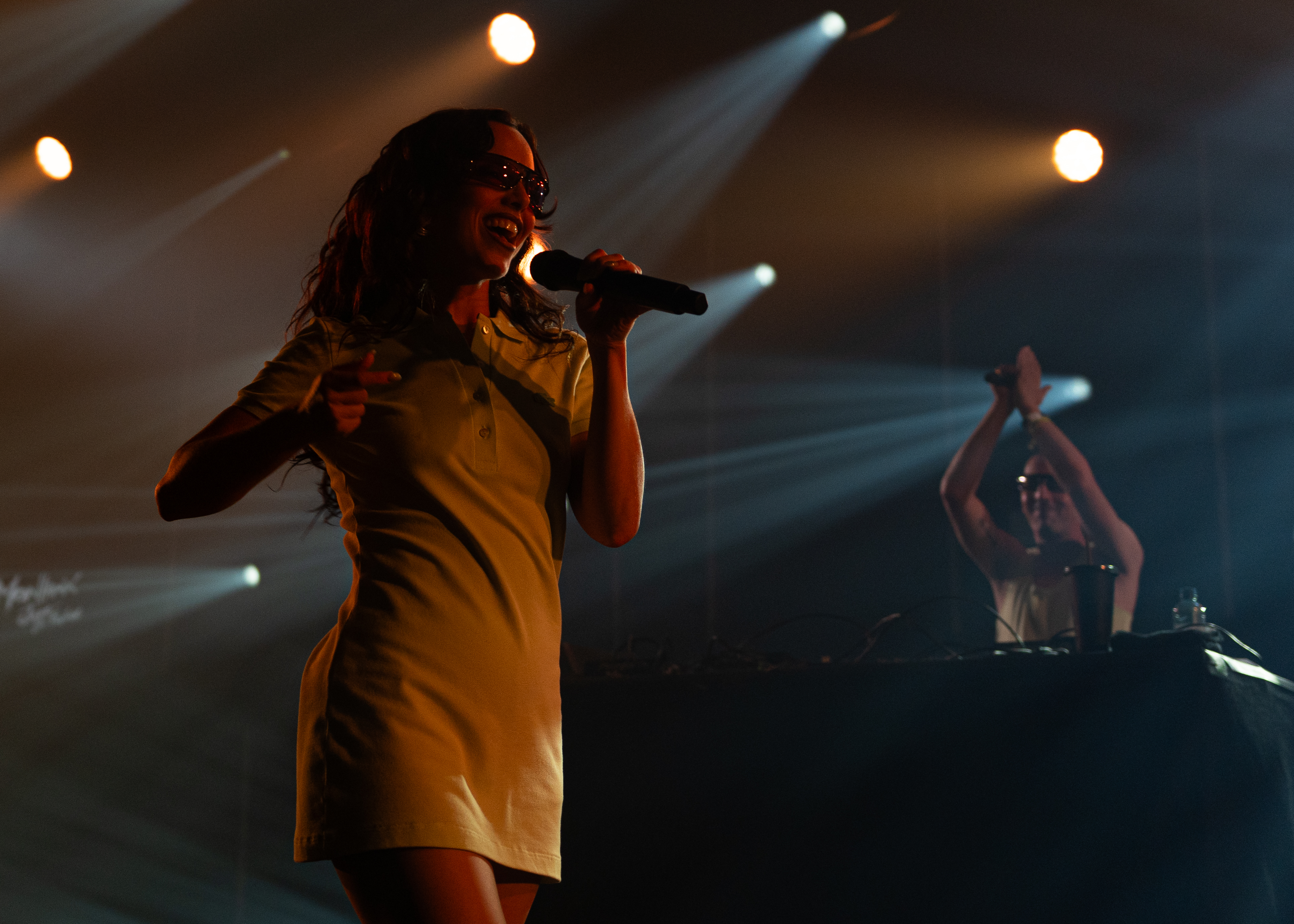
Ascendant Vierge at the Montreux Jazz Festival 2026.

Ascendant Vierge is a French electronic music group consisting of Mathilde Fernandez and Paul Seul.

== History ==
Paul Seul, a member of the gabber music collective Casual Gabberz, participated in 2018 in a remix for Mathilde Fernandez's EP Hyperstition. Mathilde Fernandez is a gothic pop singer. She considers this remix of her track Oubliette, created in one day, to be the best song on her EP and decides to continue their collaboration starting from 2019. Paul Seul produces the instrumental parts while Mathilde Fernandez handles the vocals. Their musical style is generally referred to as lyrical or melodic techno, sometimes even described as "cyberpop"; they are occasionally also associated with the hyperpop movement. Paul Seul cites influences from techno, trance, hardcore, and 1990s genres like breakbeat and drum and bass, while Mathilde Fernandez draws inspiration from artists such as Mylène Farmer or David Bowie.

They decide to name the group based on their respective astrological signs, with Paul being a Virgo and Mathilde Fernandez being a Gemini with a Virgo ascendant. Mathilde Fernandez also confesses to appreciating that the name has "a bit of a mystical, cosmic, futuristic reference".

In March 2020, they released the music video for their single Faire et refaire. Following the August 2020 release of a cyberpunk aesthetic music video for "Influenceur," directed by Kevin Elamrani-Lince and the Golgotha collective, they are notably compared to the electroclash group Sexy Sushi. The song also gained popularity during the COVID-19 lockdowns in France. In October 2020, they released their debut EP Vierge, consisting of seven tracks and well-received by critics.

They performed at various festivals, including Nuits Sonores in 2021, followed by We Love Green, Dour Festival, and Eurockéennes in 2022. Their debut album, titled "Une nouvelle chance," was released on 28 April 2023.

== Discography ==
=== Albums ===
- 2023: Une nouvelle chance
- 2024: Le Plus Grand Spectacle de la Terre

=== EPs ===
- 2020: Vierge

=== Singles ===
- 2019: Faire et refaire
- 2020: Influenceur
- 2020: Discoteca
- 2021: Petit Soldat
- 2022: Au top
- 2023: À l'infini
- 2024: Lotus noir
- 2024: Illusion
- 2024: Pour vivre (et compte bien ne mourir jamais)
- 2025: De quoi ma nature est donc faite ?

== Awards and nominations ==
=== Berlin Music Video Awards ===
The Berlin Music Video Awards is an international festival that promotes the art of music videos.

Year	Nominated work	Award	Result	Ref.
2025	"Tic Tac"	Best Concept	Nominated	
