= Ghosts (2020 film) =

2020 film

- Directed by: Azra Deniz Okyay
- Screenplay by: Azra Deniz Okyay
- Produced by: Dilek Aydin
- Starring: Dilayda Günes
- Cinematography: Baris Özbiçer
- Edited by: Ayris Alptekin
- Music by: Ekin Uzeltuzenci
- Release date: 2020
- Countries: Turkey; France; Qatar
- Language: Turkish

Ghosts (Turkish: Hayaletler, French: Les Fantômes d'Istanbul) is a 2020 drama film written and directed by Azra Deniz Okyay, in his feature debut. A co-production between Turkey, France and Qatar, it premiered at the 77th Venice International Film Festival, in which it was awarded the Venice's Critics' Week Grand Prize. It also won five awards, including for best film and best director, at the 57th Antalya Golden Orange Film Festival, and the Young FIPRESCI Jury Award at the 36th Warsaw Film Festival.

== Cast ==
- Dilayda Günes as Dilem
- Beril Kayar as Ela
- Nalan Kuruçim as Iffet
- Emrah Özdemir as Rasit
- Ahmet Turan as Baran Çakmak
- Ihsan Ozgen as Sadi
- Selin Menek as Ayse
- Ekin Aribas as Sena
- Asude Seyma Öztürk as Pinar
