= Amélie Bonnin =

French director, screenwriter, and art director

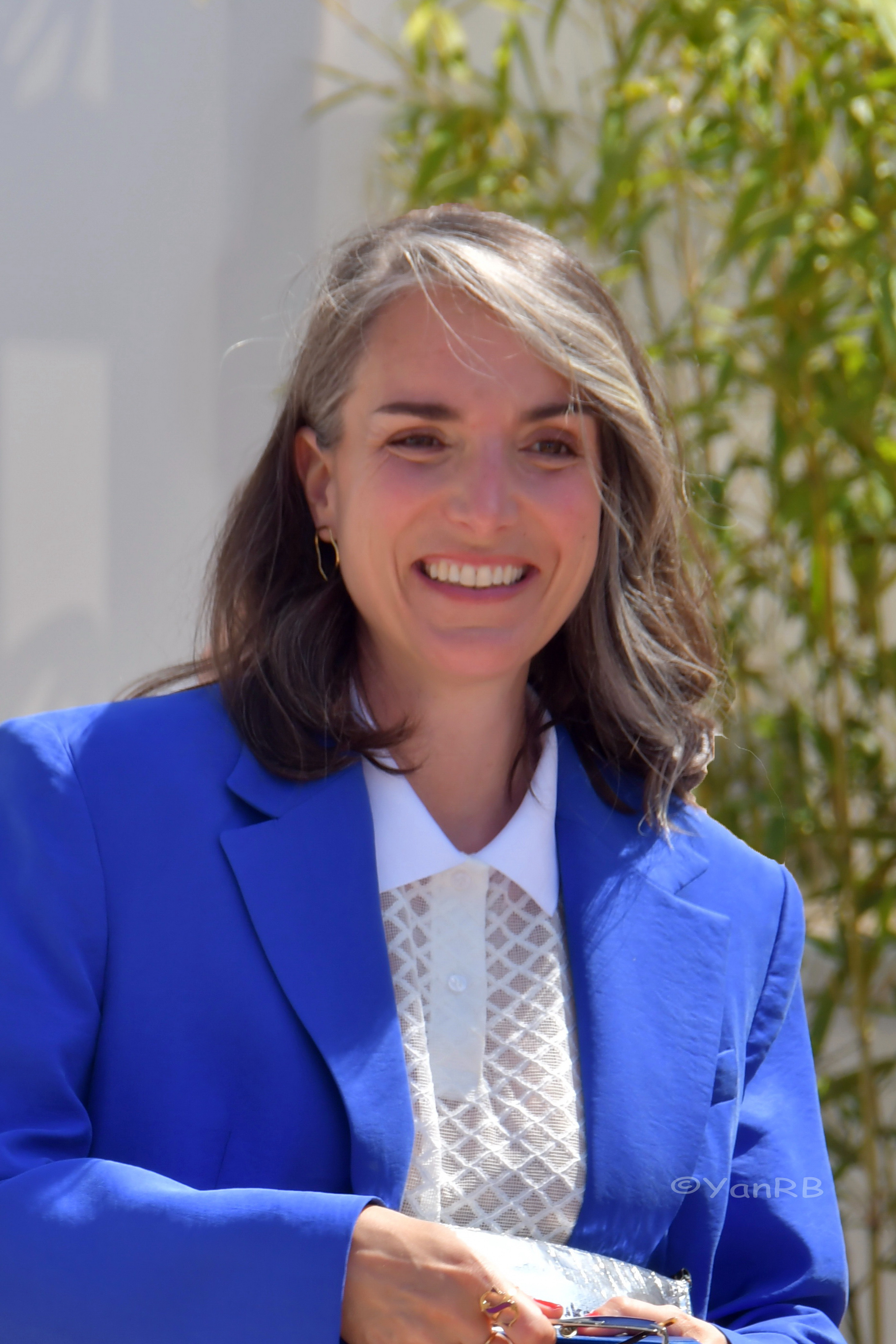
- Amélie Bonnin at the Cannes Film Festival 2025
- Born: 1985 (age 40–41); Châteauroux
- Occupations: Film director, screenwriter
- Awards: César Award for Best Fiction Short Film 2023
- Website: ameliebonnin.fr

Amélie Bonnin is a French director, screenwriter, and art director born in 1985 in Châteauroux.

In 2023, she received a César for Best Short Film for Partir un jour. In 2025, she adapted the short into a feature film, also called Partir un jour (English title: Leave One Day) which was selected to open the 2025 Cannes Film Festival.

== Biography ==
Amélie Bonnin was born in Châteauroux in 1985. Her parents worked in banking, and her maternal family came from a lineage of butchers spanning several generations. This familial heritage inspired her to create a 52-minute documentary in 2012 called La mélodie du boucher, which was aired on Arte.

She completed her high school studies with a theater option. With a childhood friend, Aurélie Charon (future journalist and radio presenter), she moved to Paris and continued her education at the art school Olivier-de-Serres, followed by studies in graphic design at the Université du Québec à Montréal. There, she specialized further and became an art director.

In 2016, she enrolled in La Fémis to study screenwriting while continuing her work at a communications agency and later for a feminist quarterly magazine, La Déferlante.

In 2017, she directed a second documentary titled La Bande des Français for France 3, co-directed with Aurélie Charon.

In 2021, she released her first fictional short musical film titled Partir un jour, which earned her the César Award for Best Fiction Short Film. During the award ceremony, she declared, "I'm 40 years old, have white hair, and everything is just beginning." She also addressed her two sons: "Guys, it’s not only Mbappé who can bring the cup home!"

She then adapted the same theme into a feature film, with variations and additions. Among the cast are actors Juliette Armanet, Bastien Bouillon, and François Rollin, who were also in the short film. She also directed Tewfik Jallab, Dominique Blanc, Mhamed Arezki, and Amandine Dewasmes. As with the short film, she co-wrote the screenplay for the feature with Dimitri Lucas. Partir un jour (Leave One Day) was selected to open the 2025 Cannes Film Festival. She thus becomes the fourth director to open the Cannes Festival and the first time a debut feature film has been chosen as the opening film for the festival.

== Filmography ==
- 2012: La Mélodie du boucher (TV documentary)
- 2017: La Bande des Français (TV documentary) - co-directed with Aurélie Charon
- 2021: Partir un jour (short film)
- 2023: Parlement (TV series), season 3:
  - Episode 5, Super pro Brexit
  - Episode 6, Riders
  - Episode 7, You shall not pass
- 2025: Partir un jour (feature film, English title Leave One Day)

== Honours ==
=== Awards ===
- Festival Off-Courts 2021: Audience Award Region Normandy for Partir un jour
- Clermont-Ferrand International Short Film Festival 2022: Audience Award for Partir un jour
- César Awards 2023: Best Short Film for Partir un jour
- Cabourg Film Festival 2025: Golden Swan for Best Direction for Partir un jour

=== Nominations ===
- Clermont-Ferrand International Short Film Festival 2022: In competition for the Grand Prix in the National Selection for Partir un jour
- 2025 Cannes Film Festival: Opening film and in competition for the Golden Camera for Partir un jour
