= Eden (2001 film) =

2001 film

- Directed by: Amos Gitai
- Screenplay by: Amos Gitai; Marie-Jose Sanselme; Nick Villiers
- Starring: Samantha Morton; Thomas Jane
- Cinematography: Renato Berta
- Edited by: Monica Coleman; Kobi Netanel
- Release date: 2001
- Language: English

Eden (Hebrew: עד) is a 2001 war drama film co-written and directed by Amos Gitai. A co-production between Israel, Italy and France, it premiered in competition at the 58th Venice International Film Festival.

== Cast ==
- Samantha Morton as Sam
- Thomas Jane as Dov
- Luke Holland as Kalkovsky
- Daphna Kastner as Silvia
- Danny Huston as Kalman
- Arthur Miller as the Father

== Production ==
The film is an adaptation of the Arthur Miller's 1992 novella Homely Girl, A Life. Shot between Israel, United States and Italy, it had some scenes filmed at Miller's house in Roxbury, Connecticut.

== Release ==
The film entered the main competition at the 58th edition of the Venice Film Festival.

== Reception ==
Variety's critic Deborah Young panned the film, describing it as "a mass of undigested drama", in which "pieces of history, [...] had they been better dramatized, could have laid the foundations for a fascinating film". Lietta Tornabuoni from La Stampa was also critical, noting that "the intentions were commendable and ambitious", but "the slow, dragging pace does not offer opportunities for reflection, instead provoking frustration".
