= Philippe Rebbot =

French actor

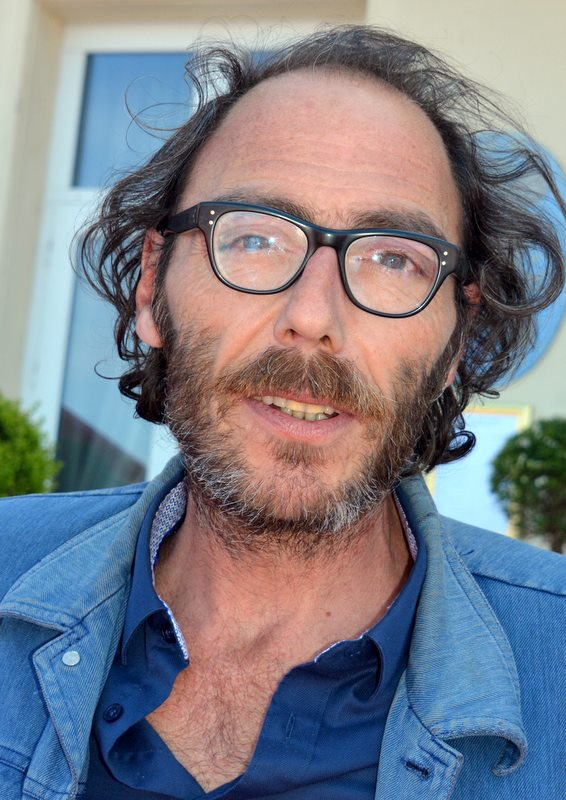
- Philippe Rebbot at the 2015 Cabourg Film Festival
- Born: 30 November 1964 (age 61); Casablanca, Maroc
- Occupations: Actor, Writer
- Years active: 1998–present
- Children: 2

Philippe Rebbot is a French actor. He appeared in more than eighty films since 1998 and starred in several films including The Aquatic Effect, Une famille à louer and Northern Wind.

== Filmography ==
Year	Title	Role	Director	Notes
1998	L'Ennui	Waiter at Momo's cafe	Cédric Kahn	
2000	Modern Life	Threatening man	Laurence Ferreira Barbosa	
2000	30 ans	Rony	Laurent Perrin	
2000	À découvert	Bass	Camille Brottes	Short, also writer
2001	J'attends Daniel pour peindre	Daniel	Nathalie Donnini	Short
2002	Du poil de la bête...	The goal	Hany Tamba	Short
2002	Le cadeau commun	Paul	Nathalie Donnini	Short
2002	Je n'ai jamais tué personne	Eric	Edouard Deluc	Short
2004	À quoi ça sert de voter écolo ?	Baptiste	Aure Atika	Short
2006	Aurore	Prison guard 2	Nils Tavernier	
2006	Avec un grand A	Jean-François	Olivier Lorelle	Short
2007	Où avais-je la tête ?	Alfred	Nathalie Donnini	
2007	Pas douce	The bed neighbor 2	Jeanne Waltz	
2009	Un chat un chat	Viorel	Sophie Fillières	
2009	La boîte à Pépé	Matthieu	Sami Zitouni	Short
2009	¿Donde está Kim Basinger?	Marcus	Edouard Deluc	Short; Clermont-Ferrand International Short Film Festival - Best Actor
2009	Ticket gagnant	Daniel	Julien Weill	TV movie
2010	Suite parlée	Sous terre	Joël Brisse & Marie Vermillard	
2010	Les meilleurs amis du monde	The man in the car	Julien Rambaldi	
2010	Le sentiment de la chair	The guardian	Roberto Garzelli	
2011	Tous les soleils	Jean-Paul	Philippe Claudel	
2011	Des trous dans le silence	The neighbor	Vincent Lebrun	Short
2012	Mariage à Mendoza	Marcus	Edouard Deluc	
2012	Chroniques d'une cour de récré	Monsieur Henri	Brahim Fritah	
2012	Tennis Elbow	The father	Vital Philippot	Short
2013	One of a Kind	Nanar	François Dupeyron	
2013	Lulu femme nue	Jean-Marie	Sólveig Anspach	
2013	Baby Balloon	Mitch	Stefan Liberski	
2013	Mona	Gary	Alexis Barbosa	Short
2013	Nora	Daniel	Noël Fuzellier	Short
2013	La femme qui flottait	Lionel	Thibault Lang Willar	Short
2013	Le déclin de l'empire masculin	Willy William	Angelo Cianci	TV movie
2014	Hippocrate	Guy	Thomas Lilti	
2014	Almost Friends	Pierre Perusel	Anne Le Ny	
2014	Get Well Soon	Thierry	Jean Becker	
2014	Ablations	The veterinary	Arnold de Parscau	
2014	Fool Circle	Yvan	Vincent Mariette	
2014	Le Père Noël	Camille	Alexandre Coffre	
2014	Goal of the Dead	Fred	Thierry Poiraud & Benjamin Rocher	
2014	Weekends in Normandy	The junk dealer	Anne Villacèque	
2014	Zouzou	Frédo	Blandine Lenoir	
2014	Le domaine des étriqués	Pete	Arnold de Parscau	Short
2015	Rosalie Blum	The room-mate	Julien Rappeneau	
2015	The White Knights	Luc Debroux	Joachim Lafosse	
2015	Une famille à louer	Rémi	Jean-Pierre Améris	
2015	21 Nights with Pattie	Jean-Marc	Arnaud & Jean-Marie Larrieu	
2015	Les chaises musicales	Fabrice Lunel	Marie Belhomme	
2015	Pitchoune	Mathias	Reda Kateb	Short
2015	Super Triste	Paul	Stéphanie Kalfon	Short
2015	Hard	Nathaniel Micheletty	Mélissa Drigeard & Laurent Dussaux	TV series (3 episodes)
2016	Smoke & Mirrors	Jean-Pierre Pinaud	Alberto Rodríguez Librero	
2016	The Aquatic Effect	Reboute	Sólveig Anspach	
2016	The First, the Last	Jésus	Bouli Lanners	
2016	Lutine	Philippe	Isabelle Broué	
2016	Le petit locataire	Jean-Pierre Payan	Nadège Loiseau	
2016	Yo! Pékin	Monsieur Bretonneau	Estéban	Short
2016	Y a pas de lézard	Jean-Pierre	Noël Fuzellier	Short
2016	Serval et Chaumier, maîtres des ombres	Jules Chaumier	Bastien Daret & Arthur Goisset	Short
2017	I Got Life!	Nanar	Blandine Lenoir	
2017	Vénéneuses	The defrocked priest	Jean-Pierre Mocky	
2017	Vent du Nord	Hervé Lepoutre	Walid Mattar	
2017	Simon et Théodore	Paul	Mikael Buch	
2017	Des plans sur la comète	Michel	Guilhem Amesland	
2017	Gauguin - Voyage de Tahiti	The young poet	Edouard Deluc	
2017	Icare	Leonard	Nicolas Boucart	Short
2017	Canine panique	Peigne-Cul	Baptiste Drapeau	Short
2017	Les bigorneaux	Guy	Alice Vial	Short
2017	Les Onironautes	The captain	Mathias Zivanovic	Short
2017	Aurore	François Ravel	Laetitia Masson	TV series (2 episodes)
2018	La finale	Claude	Robin Sykes	
2018	L'amour flou	Philippe	Romane Bohringer & Philippe Rebbot	Nominated - César Award for Best First Feature Film; Nominated - Louis Delluc Prize - Best First Film
2018	Naked Normandy	Eugène	Philippe Le Guay	
2018	100 kilos d'étoiles		Marie-Sophie Chambon	
2018	Âmes soeurs	Régis	Pierre Deladonchamps	Short
2018	Waterfountain	Armand Munster	Jules Follet	Short
2018	Panique au Sénat	The bailiff	Antonin Peretjatko	Short
2018	Allonge ta foulée	The trainer	Brahim Fritah	Short
2018	Les Petits Meurtres d'Agatha Christie	Dr. Locart	Didier Bivel	TV series (1 episode)
2018	C'est quoi ton nom	Monsieur Rebbot	Emilie & Sarah Barbault	TV series (1 episode)
2019	Moi, maman, ma mère et moi	Antoine Mounier	Christophe Le Masne	
2019	Temps de chien	Jean	Edouard Deluc	Post-Production
2019	Mine de rien		Mathias Mlekuz	Post-Production
2020	Mars Colony	CT-LT030426A	Noël Fuzellier	Short, Won Best Supporting Actor at the International Film Festival of Wales
2022	Three Times Nothing	Casquette	Nadège Loiseau	
2022	House of Lust	The Franchman	Anissa Bonnefont	
2026	Nobody's Violence		Denis Côté	

== Personal life ==
In 2004, Rebbot met the actress Romane Bohringer, on the set of the TV Movie Le Triporteur de Belleville. On 26 December 2008 Romane gave birth to their first child, a baby girl named Rose, and on 2 August 2011 she gave birth to Raoul, a boy.
