= The Aquatic Effect =

2016 film

- Film poster
- Directed by: Sólveig Anspach
- Written by: Sólveig Anspach; Jean-Luc Gaget
- Produced by: Patrick Sobelman
- Starring: Florence Loiret Caille; Samir Guesmi
- Cinematography: Isabelle Razavet
- Edited by: Anne Riegel
- Music by: Martin Wheeler
- Distributed by: Le Pacte
- Release dates: 17 May 2016 (Cannes); 29 June 2016 (France)
- Running time: 95 minutes
- Countries: France; Iceland
- Language: French
- Budget: $720,000
- Box office: $1.9 million

The Aquatic Effect (French: L'Effet aquatique), also known as The Together Project, is a 2016 French-Icelandic comedy-drama film directed by Sólveig Anspach. It was screened in the Directors' Fortnight section at the 2016 Cannes Film Festival where it won the SACD Award. It won the César Award for Best Original Screenplay at the 42nd César Awards.

== Plot ==
Samir is attracted to Agathe, so enrols in swimming lessons at local pool where she is trainer. One evening, he is locked in and wandering around he finds Agathe is also there. They go to the diving tower and kiss, but another pool attendant sneaks in with two drunk women. One falls in and Samir rescues her. Agathe runs away. Next day Samir goes to the pool and learns she has gone to a conference in Iceland. Samir goes to follow her, and gets into the conference by pretending to be the Israeli official. When asked to speak, he improvises a "Together Project" a pool to be built by Israel and Palestine, which earns him applause. By chance, both Agathe and Samir know Anna, a city councillor. They stay at her house, where Samir receives electric shock from faulty coffee machine. Upon recovery, he appears to have lost his memory. A doctor gives them some cards as a memory exercise. Later Samir notices a card is missing, and instead finds the business card of the Palestinian representative. He calls him, then meets him and they end up on a tourist bus together. Agathe wants to find Samir and Anna is going in the same direction to her brother's farm. There the grandmother tells Agathe her fortune, and she realises the feelings she has for Samir. Anna tracks Samir down to a geothermal pool, where another woman is trying to seduce Samir. They arrive just in time, and Agathe kisses Samir, reviving his memory.

== Cast ==
- Samir Guesmi as Samir
- Florence Loiret Caille as Agathe
- Philippe Rebbot as Reboute
- Estéban as Daniel
- Stéphane Soo Mongo as Youssef
- Olivia Côte as Corinne
- Ingvar Eggert Sigurðsson as Siggi
- Nina Meurisse as The drowned girl
