= Ismael El Iraki =

Ismael El Maoula El Iraki (born 1983 in Morocco) is a French-Moroccan filmmaker. He is a survivor of the November 2015 attacks on the Bataclan in Paris, which inspired his first feature film, Zanka Contact.

== Biography ==
El Iraki was born in Morocco in 1983. He moved to France in 2001, where he studied philosophy and film theory before entering the directing section of La Fémis in 2004. His short film Carcasse, a sci-fi movie about construction workers in the Sahara, won the Short Film Corner Award in Cannes. His second short film Harash, a dark comedy thriller set in Casablanca, won the Jury Award and the Attention Talent Directing Award at the Clermont-Ferrand International Short Film Festival. They were both edited on DVD by the FNAC French cultural retail chain. El Iraki is a survivor of the November 2015 Paris attack at the Bataclan. His experience of PTSD was channeled into his feature film Zanka Contact (a.k.a. Burning Casablanca).

== Zanka Contact ==
El Iraki kept many of the cast and crew from his shorts (including actors Said Bey and Mourad Zaoui) on his first feature Zanka Contact, also known under the French release title Burning Casablanca. The movie premiered in 2020 in the official selection of the 77th Venice International Film Festival. The lead actress Khansa Batma won the Lion for Best ActressOrizzonti section.

Despite being premiered in the middle of the COVID-19 pandemic, the movie still obtained many selections in international festivals around the world: Busan International Film Festival, São Paulo International Film Festival, Karlovy Vary International Film Festival and many more. Described as a rock n' roll thriller-western set in Casablanca, compared to Wild At Heart or Head-On and shot on 35mm film in a CinemaScopeAnamorphic, Zanka Contact went on the win several international awards among which the Best Film Award at the Luxor African Film Festival.

Zanka Contact was theatrically released in France on November 3, 2021, under the changed title Burning Casablanca. Director explained that the change was decided with the French distributor during the COVID-19 pandemic to avoid sounding like the French phrase "cas contact", which refers to someone who had close contact with a COVID-19 case. The film beneficiated from a wave of support from film critics in France and did well theatrically for a post-COVID release.

The Moroccan release took place on December 1, 2021, to critic and commercial acclaim. 10 months later in September 2022, Zanka Contact participated in the Tangier National Film Festival and won Best Film and Best Actress in a Supporting Role for actress Fatima Attif.

== Filmography ==
=== Feature films ===
- 2020: Zanka Contact A.K.A Burning Casablanca (French title)

=== Short films ===
- 2007: Carcasse
- 2008: Harash
