= Hounds (film) =

2023 film by Kamal Lazraq

- Theatrical release poster
- French: Les meutes
- Directed by: Kamal Lazraq
- Written by: Kamal Lazraq
- Produced by: Saïd Hamich Benlarbi
- Starring: Ayoub Elaïd; Abdellatif Masstouri
- Cinematography: Amine Berrada
- Edited by: Héloïse Pelloquet; Stéphane Myczkowski
- Music by: P.R2B
- Production companies: Barney Production; Mont Fleuri Production; Beluga Tree
- Distributed by: Ad Vitam
- Release dates: 19 May 2023 (Cannes); 19 July 2023 (France)
- Running time: 94 minutes
- Countries: Morocco; France; Belgium
- Language: Moroccan Arabic
- Box office: $206,498

Hounds (French: Les meutes), is a 2023 Moroccan crime drama film written and directed by Kamal Lazraq. Taking place over one night in Casablanca, it follows Hassan and Issam, an impoverished father-son duo, as they attempt to dispose of a body after a botched kidnapping. The film explores themes of survival, familial conflict, and moral quandaries against the backdrop of urban Morocco.

The film features non-professional actors, including Abdellatif Masstouri as Hassan and Ayoub Elaïd as Issam, chosen for their authentic portrayal of characters reflecting the underworld milieu. Production took place in Casablanca, using improvised dialogue and a documentary-style approach.

Hounds premiered at the 2023 Cannes Film Festival in the Un Certain Regard section, where it received the Jury Prize. Critics praised the film for its atmospheric storytelling and authentic performances, though some noted critiques regarding narrative coherence and pacing. Beyond accolades at Cannes, it garnered nominations and awards at international film festivals such as the Stockholm International Film Festival and the Brussels International Film Festival.

== Plot ==
Dib, a dog-fighting kingpin, seeks revenge after his prized hound is killed in a fight. He enlists Hassan, an impoverished dogsbody who makes a living from petty crime, to help kidnap one of the rival's middlemen. Hassan brings along his reluctant son, Issam, who is more street-smart than his father. Issam is wary of the mission, especially when their van, which he considers a bad omen due to its red color, seems to confirm his fears.

During the kidnapping, their target suffocates in the car's trunk, leading to a frantic journey to dispose of the body by morning. They are rejected by an old acquaintance of Dib's who had done similar jobs for him before but has now dropped out of criminal life. Despite Issam's insistence that both methods would not work, they then attempt to hide the body in a shallow well filled with rocks and also try digging a hole in the countryside before being caught and chased. In a desperate move, the duo head back to the city after a close encounter at a police roadblock to enlist a friend of Hassan's, an old, drunk fisherman, to dump the body in the ocean, but he falls into the water himself, leaving them with the corpse and an even guiltier conscience.

Hassan, deeply affected by the fisherman's insistence on the Islamic custom of washing the corpse as well as hallucinations of the dead, insists on performing the ritual and wrapping it in a shroud before disposing of it. They are caught by Hassan's disapproving mother, who helps them wash the body. Issam then seeks help from a friend to dispose of the body, but this plan fails, leading Issam to be trapped in a warehouse with rival gang members. Hassan informs Dib, who gathers a gang of henchmen to rescue them. Dib then takes them to an acquaintance with a large oven, ordering them to cut up the body. However, Hassan refuses, and Dib reluctantly pays someone else to do it. The body is burned and disposed of in the trash.

The next morning, Hassan and Issam are seen walking home, and a dog is later seen with a charred human arm in its mouth in a wasteland full of garbage.

== Cast ==
- Ayoub Elaïd as Issam
- Abdellatif Masstouri as Hassan
- Abdellah Lebkiri as Dib
- Lahcen Zaimouzen as Larbi
- Mohammed Kharbouchi as Jellouta
- Salah Bensalah as Jalil
- Mohamed Hmimsa as "mute man"

== Production ==
=== Casting ===
Like many North African filmmakers, Lazraq cast non-professional actors to try to achieve an authentic and raw portrayal of the community in which he set the story. Abdellatif Masstouri, the film's leading actor, was working as a street-food vendor when he was approached for the role of Hassan. The choice to focus on a father and son in Hounds was influenced by Lazraq's experience working with non-professional actors who shared their life stories. While casting for a previous short film, Lazraq met two individuals who were the right age to portray a father and son. They had shared stories about taking on risky jobs and getting trapped in downward spirals, which reminded Lazraq of Vittorio De Sica's Bicycle Thieves. This sparked the idea of exploring a father and son's struggle to survive in Hounds.

In an interview by Tarik Khaldi for Cannes, Lazraq recalls how they discovered the actors who would play the lead roles in the film:

I noticed Ayoub Elaïd (Issam, the son) in a photo. He made me think of Franco Citti in Accattone. I met him, I filmed him, he really gave off a Pasolini vibe. I kept looking and when I wanted to see Ayoub again, he'd disappeared. We looked for him and found him in his village. He came up to us and didn't understand: "I'm not an actor", he said. He needed convincing. It was Ayoub who introduced me to Abdellatif Masstouri. He was running a small grilled sardine stand. His face, at once solar and weathered, really struck me. Abdellatif has had a quite the life, very eventful: he went off to Europe, became a Taekwondo champion, served time in prison, and so on. He had something to express. We did some tests with these two actors and it worked.

According to Lazraq, many of his cast members resembled the underworld characters depicted in the film. He noted that a lot of his cast members had spent significant time in jail and committed serious offenses, but "remained very human". One of the actors, unnamed by the director, had experienced an abduction.

=== Development ===
Lazraq's motive for structuring the film over a single day and night was to intensify the viewer's connection to the story's events. This decision was also influenced by his earlier short film, Drari, which also unfolded over one night. Lazraq was drawn to the underground world of dog fights as a metaphor for survival and the challenges faced by marginalized individuals.

Hounds was shot in Casablanca. The storyline evolved during filming and editing, leading to significant rewrites. Lazraq favored improvised dialogue, though he acknowledged the need to rewrite certain scenes he was not satisfied with. The director, grappling with the challenges of filming mostly at night, described the experience as incredibly demanding. He recalled the surreal feeling after weeks of shooting, where both the actors and crew were exhausted, often losing track of time and place. Following the intense filming period, Lazraq slept for two days straight, questioning himself: "What have I done? Is there a film?". He noted that it was only during the editing phase that the film began to take shape.

Director of photography Amine Berrada stated that director Lazraq favored a documentary-style camera, which he described as 'deeply immersive', for this film, and that it was shot in sequence to prevent the non-professional actors from becoming disoriented. Due to the impracticality of requesting multiple takes or adhering to specific marks, they had to continuously adapt to the performances of the actors, which led them to film the movie handheld.

The film was produced by Saïd Hamich Benlarbi for Barney Production, in collaboration with Moroccan company Mont Fleuri Production and Belgian outfit Beluga Tree. Editing was handled by Héloïse Pelloquet and Stéphane Myczkowski, with the soundtrack composed by P.R2B.

=== Release ===
Hounds competed in the Un Certain Regard section at the 76th Cannes Film Festival, where it had its world premiere on 19 May 2023.

It was theatrically released in France on 19 July 2023 by Ad Vitam. The film was previewed on 29 January 2024 at a theater in Casablanca. It was released in theaters in Morocco on 31 January. In May 2024, it was reported that Indican Pictures had acquired North American rights to the film. It has been shown theatrically in Australia, France, and Italy, with Indican planning to release it in the US and Canada during the summer of 2024. The film began its theatrical run in UK and Ireland cinemas on 14 June.

== Themes ==
In blending influences for Hounds, Lazraq drew from neo-realism, citing films like Bicycle Thieves and Pasolini's Accattone for their portrayal of lost characters navigating city suburbs. He aimed to depict the margins of Moroccan society by grounding the characters in a specific social reality at the beginning of the film, showcasing their struggles to survive and their willingness to accept work for survival.

The film also touches on patriarchal structures. In Moroccan culture, the relationship with fathers is revered, and their authority is rarely challenged. For the father, the son, too reflective, is not a rightful man. For the son, the father, a former convict, has failed in life. The grandmother is the only person to truly holds things together. Despite all the hardship, she clings to her beliefs, passes on values, and knows how to adapt to life's uncertainties and challenges. Lazraq sought to portray this dynamic but also show a tipping point where the son takes control, leading to a reversal in their roles halfway through the film. The theme of masculinity is prominently featured in the film, with the actors frequently discussing the concept of being a man and portraying masculinity as an inherently positive trait. Lazraq highlights the intention to depict how an excess of masculinity can lead to animalistic behavior, as illustrated by the metaphor of the dogfight and the strong resurgence of "beastliness" throughout the film.

Lazraq also alludes to the Greek myth of Sisyphus, condemned to push a boulder uphill only for it to roll back down as he nears the top. He perceives an existentialist theme in the film, where attempts to find a solution are constantly thwarted, leading to a sense of absurdity.

== Reception ==
=== Critical response ===
Guy Lodge of Variety writes that "Kamal Lazraq's father-son crime story is assured and energetic, but stops short of the raucous farce it could have been." He commends the film's atmospheric storytelling and the performances of the non-professional actors, noting their authenticity. He suggests that while the film maintains a gritty and discomforting tone, some tonal variation could have enhanced the overall experience. Despite this, Lodge finds the film to be a "notably punchy debut" with a strong sense of place, describing it as "both visceral and confidently cavalier in its depiction of everyday underworld brutality."

In his review for The Hollywood Reporter, Jordan Mintzer describes the film as a "grungy and realistic Casablanca-set thriller," noting its exploration of contemporary Moroccan life through a film noir lens. He praises Lazraq's direction as "impressively executed" but notes it is "a bit of a one-note affair," suggesting it could have benefited from "more dark tragicomedy." Mintzer also compliments the film's bleak portrayal of Casablanca's underbelly, highlighting how every interaction reflects the struggle to survive in a city with limited opportunities.

The New Arab's Hanna Flint writes that the film is a "tightly-delivered, evenly-paced cinematic skirmish into the underbelly of Moroccan society with admirable performances glueing it together". She praises the film for its use of gallows humor and what she saw as an ability to maintain tension, but suggests it could have further developed its darker comedic elements. In a 4-star review, Donald Clarke of The Irish Times notes a "strong streak of anthracite-black humour" throughout the film, highlighted by disastrous comedic attempts and the absurdist treatment of the corpse, while also praising the film's exploration of the strained father-son relationship and its ironic twists. He also states that Lazraq's decision to cast mostly amateur actors "adds greatly to the character of the piece".

Writing for Cineuropa, Davide Abbatescianni praised the film for what he considered to be an effective portrayal of events over the course of one night, creating a fast-paced narrative that evokes a sense of danger and fear for the lead characters. He further complimented the cinematography and score, describing them as fitting perfectly with the film's "absurd, frenetic" storytelling style. Le Monde's Jacques Mandelbaum praised the film, describing it as remarkable. Chris Shields of Sight and Sound praised the film as a "striking parable of human degradation", likening it to classic gangster films by Josef von Sternberg, Jacques Becker, and Michael Curtiz. He drew parallels between Lazraq's narrative and the sequences in Martin Scorsese’s GoodFellas, while commending his effective use of Moroccan settings and "well-placed gallows humour," emphasizing their contribution to the film's originality.

In a more critical review for Little White Lies, David Jenkins describes Hounds as a "contrived crime story outstays its welcome," finding the film's premise contrived and its narrative lacking coherence. Despite acknowledging what he sees as director Kamal Lazraq's strengths in creating mood and using striking locations, Jenkins concludes that the film starts off promisingly but falters with a disjointed middle and a "silly ending". Charlotte O'Sullivan of The Guardian rated the film 3 out of 5 stars, commenting that it is "good-looking but uneven", and acknowledging that the tension often flags despite strong performances, particularly from Abdellatif Masstouri.

=== Accolades ===
Hounds won several awards, including the Un Certain Regard Award Jury Prize at the 2023 Cannes Film Festival, where it also competed for the Caméra d'Or award for best first feature film. It was also nominated for a Lumière Award for Best International Co-Production, the Golden Anchor for Best Debut Film at the Haifa International Film Festival, the Grand Prix at the 8th Brussels International Film Festival, and an award for Best Screenplay at the 2023 Stockholm International Film Festival. At the Pingyao Film Festival, Abdellatif Masstouri was awarded a Roberto Rossellini Award for his acting. The film tied with Palestinian director Lina Soualem's Bye Bye Tiberias for the Jury Prize at the 20th Marrakech International Film Festival. It also received a Prix spécial coup de projecteur UniversCiné (UniversCiné Special Spotlight Award) at the La Baule Film & Music Festival.
