= Across the Sea (film) =

2024 film

- French: La mer au loin
- Directed by: Saïd Hamich Benlarbi
- Written by: Saïd Hamich Benlarbi
- Produced by: Sophie Penson
- Starring: Ayoub Gretaa; Grégoire Colin; Anna Mouglalis
- Cinematography: Tom Harari
- Edited by: Lilian Corbeille
- Music by: P.R2B
- Production companies: Barney Production; Mont Fleuri; Tarantula
- Distributed by: The Jokers Films
- Release date: 17 May 2024 (Cannes)
- Running time: 112 minutes
- Countries: France; Morocco; Belgium; Qatar
- Languages: French; Arabic

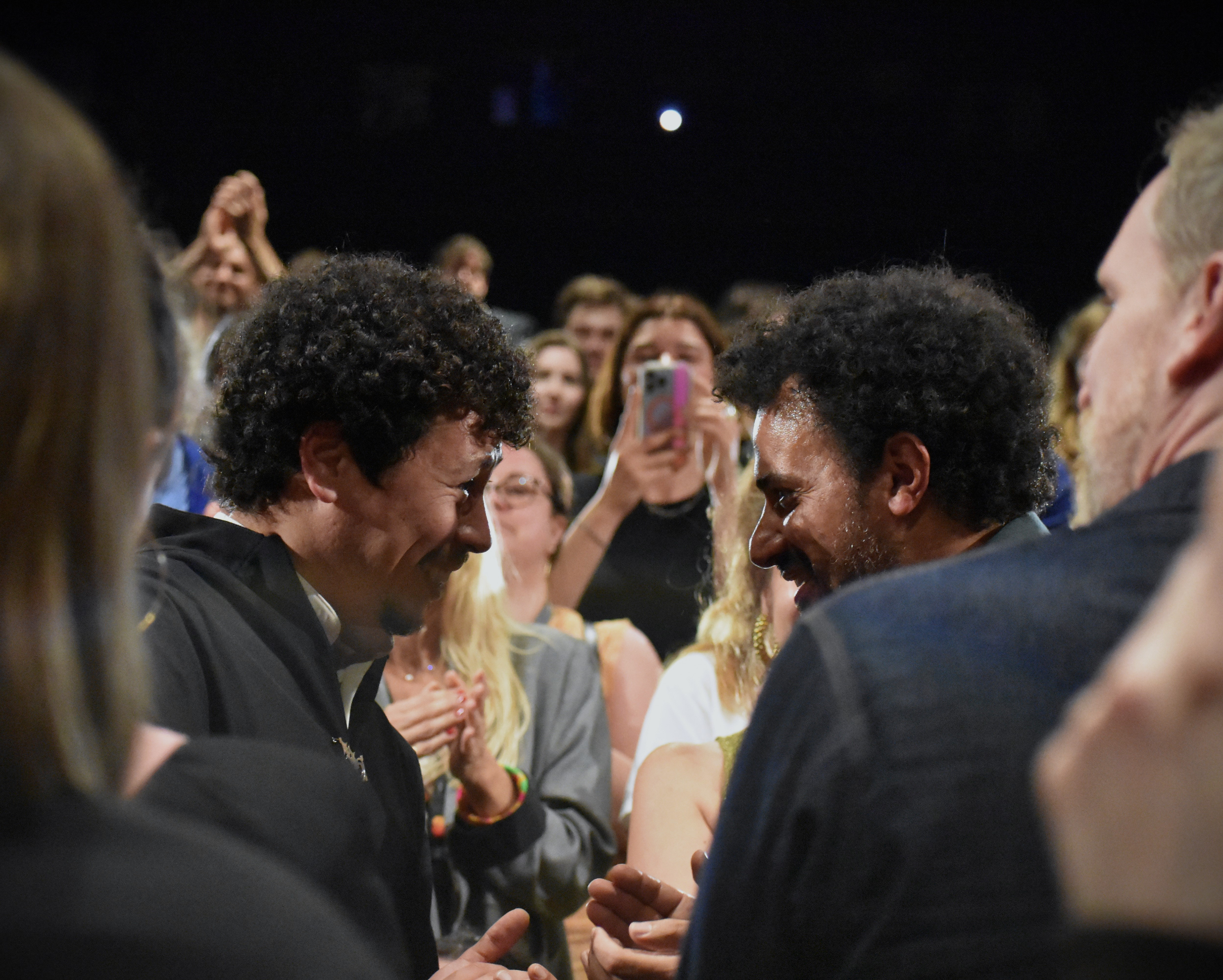
Saïd Hamich Benlarbi and Ayoub Gretaa at Across the Sea premiere 2024

Across the Sea (French: La mer au loin) is a drama film, directed by Saïd Hamich Benlarbi and released in 2024.

Told as a triptych with each chapter named after one of the three main characters, the film centres on a love triangle that develops between Nour (Ayoub Gretaa), a young man from Morocco who came to Marseille as an illegal immigrant in the 1990s; Serge (Grégoire Colin), a closeted bisexual police officer who takes pity on Nour and helps him get set up with a stable life rather than arresting or deporting him; and Noémie (Anna Mouglalis), Serge's wife who initiates an extramarital affair with Nour after years of quietly putting up with Serge cheating on her with other men.

The cast also includes Omar Boulakirba, Rym Foglia, Sarah Henochsberg and Ali Mehdi Moulai in supporting roles.

== Production ==
The film is a coproduction of companies from France, Morocco, Belgium and Qatar.

According to Benlarbi, the film was indirectly inspired by his own experience of moving to France from his native Morocco in childhood, and centres on the theme of Nour finding a sense of belonging in an unconventional sort of family after going through the experience of living in exile from his homeland. He also stressed the importance of raï music to the film, noting that immigrants often share the experience of retaining a deep emotional connection to the native music of their former homelands.

== Distribution ==
The film premiered on 17 May 2024 in the Critics Week program at the 2024 Cannes Film Festival, where it was a nominee for the Queer Palm.
