= Luke Holland (filmmaker) =

English filmmaker

- Luke Holland
- Born: 1948; Ludlow, England
- Died: 2020 (aged 71–72)
- Known for: Final Account (film)

Luke Holland (1948–2020) was an English photographer and documentary filmmaker, best known for the film Final Account.

== Early life and education ==
Holland was born in Ludlow, Shropshire, to parents who were members of the Bruderhof Christian community, a pacifist communal group with no private property. At age four his family moved to the German speaking Bruderhof community in a remote area of Paraguay, among the hostile Indigenous people of the Chaco; they returned to the U.K after a decade. He grew up speaking English, Spanish, German, and Guarani; he learned German from German Paraguayans. When he was in his teens he learned that his mother was a Jewish refugee from Vienna, his maternal grandparents had been murdered in the Holocaust, and many of the Germans he had known in Paraguay were resettled Nazis. Upon return to the U.K. he continued his education in Malmesbury, Wiltshire, and then graduated a teacher training college allied to Manchester University with degrees in German and theatre.

== Career ==
He started his career as a photographer. His first exhibition was in 1980, Hunting the Pig People; Indians Missionaries and the Promised Land. The exhibit showed at the ICA in London, and then he toured with it for a year in the U.S. From 1981 to 1991 he worked for Survival International creating media campaigns championing the rights of threatened tribal people. He believed that "the media and campaigning could change the world."

In the 1990s he left photography and became a documentary filmmaker; he ran an independent production company, based in Sussex. Several of his films dealt with Germany and its relationship to the Hitler and the Holocaust. His family history with the Holocaust "informed his life and work."

The 1993 Prix Europa and Emmy entry Good Morning Mr Hitler was based on a discovered amateur film of the Nazi Munich festival of July 1939. This was a mass celebration attended by Hitler and the entire Nazi leadership. Holland assembled elderly Germans to watch themselves in the film and reminisce about their feelings and thoughts at the time.

His 1999 production of I Was a Slave Laborer documented the efforts of victim activists to hold the German government and industrial firms responsible for the forced labor that German industry required during World War II. This movie has been credited with helping to obtain a $5 billion compensation for about a million of the victims.

His last film was Final Account. Beginning in 2008, and lasting for more than a decade, he spoke with about 300 Germans and Austrians who had lived through Nazi Germany, "from former SS members and concentration camp guards to farmers and housewives," who, directly or indirectly, participated in the Holocaust, even if only as witnesses. He set out to find the people who had murdered his grandparents and find out why. He felt there was only a limited time left to interview the last generation of Germans who participated in the Holocaust. His hope for Final Account was "that people will think about its historical importance." The effort has been described as being done in "the nick of time," as he and many of the interviewees have since passed away.

=== Other films ===
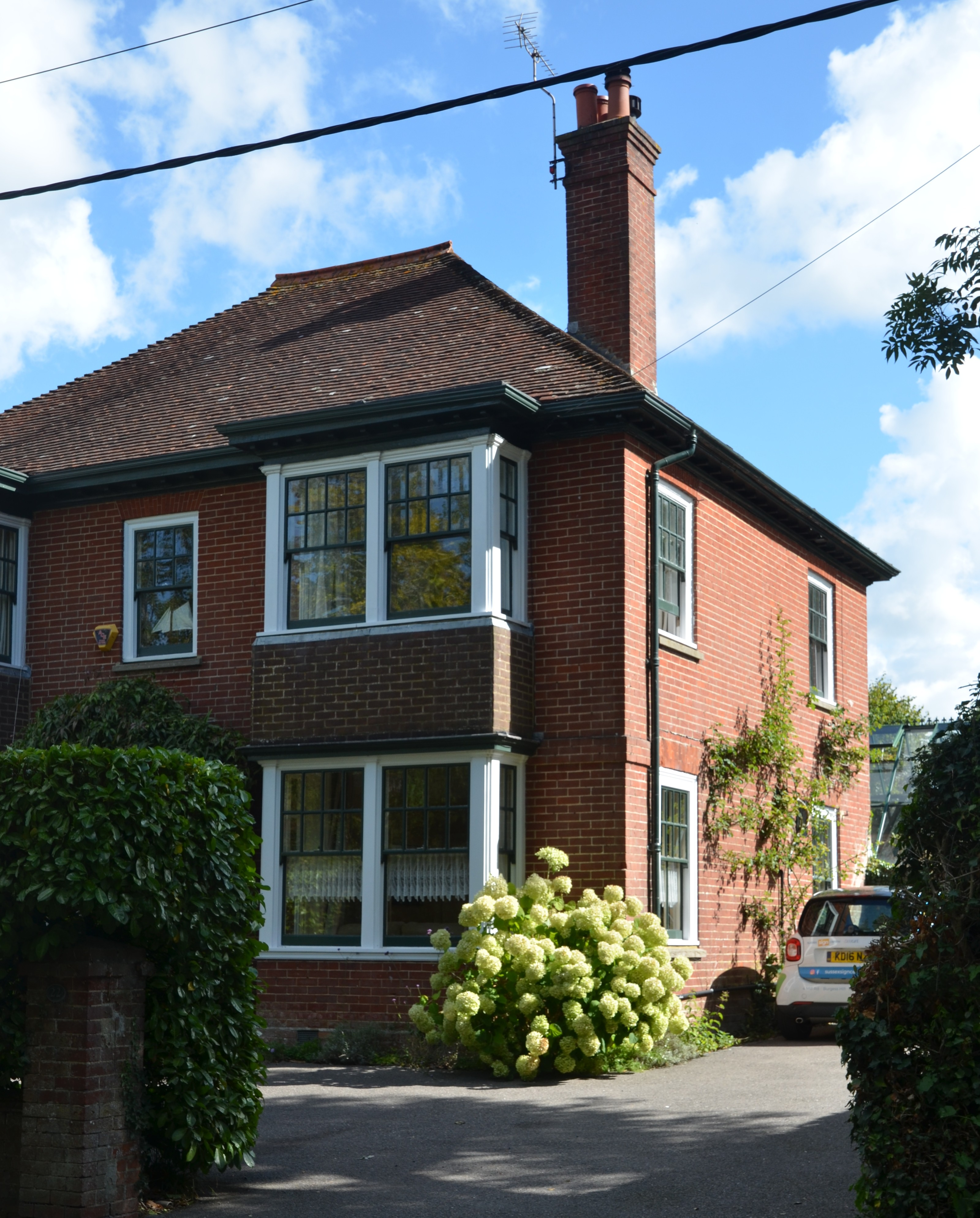
24 Beacon Road, Holland's home in Ditchling, East Sussex

The 5-part BBC Storyville series A Very English Village was filmed in his home village of Ditchling. Holland felt that rural towns were a window on the world. He collected 500 hours of film of the townspeople and examined issues including agism, effects of globalization on villages, the failing farm industry and fox hunting.

More Than a Life is the story of his brother Peter's terminal struggle with myeloma. As presented by Holland, this is a story of living with cancer rather dying of cancer.

The Wildscreen Panda Award-winning The Journey of Death reports the illegal slaughter of one million alligators a year in Brazil. The local Indigenous people, trapped by debt and poverty, were forced to hunt by local skin dealers who paid them a pittance. Holland documents the corruption at many levels.

The 5-part Channel 4 series The 'Savage' Strikes Back was a study of worldwide tribal people.

Gene Hunters describes the effort by pharmaceutical companies to find new drugs by examining the DNA of Indigenous peoples. Holland asks who will profit from this, the native tribes or large pharma?

=== International film festivals ===
He was a founding board member of both the Joods (Jewish) Film Festival, Amsterdam, and the UK Jewish Film Festival, and president of the Joris Ivens Jury committee at the International Documentary Film Festival Amsterdam, the largest documentary festival in the world. He actively promoted international exhibition of documentaries.

=== Actor ===
In 2001 Holland played a lead in Amos Gitai's film Eden.

== Personal ==
He was married in 1980 to Yvonne Hennessey, whom he met in college in 1969. They had two sons and lived in the village of Ditchling. In 2015 he was diagnosed with cancer and told he had one year to live. He died in 2020, three months before the premiere of his movie at the Venice Film Festival. During the last year of his life he completed his "documentary masterpiece, Final Account."
