= Leave One Day =

2025 film by Amélie Bonnin

- Poster
- French: Partir un jour
- Directed by: Amélie Bonnin
- Written by: Amélie Bonnin; Dimitri Lucas
- Based on: Bye Bye by Amélie Bonnin
- Produced by: Bastian Daret; Arthur Goisset; Robin Robles; Sylvie Pialat; Benoît Quainon
- Starring: Juliette Armanet; Bastien Bouillon
- Cinematography: David Cailley
- Edited by: Héloïse Pelloquet
- Production companies: Les Films du Worso; Topshot Films
- Distributed by: Pathé
- Release date: 13 May 2025 (Cannes)
- Running time: 94 minutes
- Country: France
- Language: French
- Box office: $5.3 million

Leave One Day (French: Partir un jour) is a 2025 French musical comedy-drama film co-written and directed by Amélie Bonnin in her feature directorial debut. It was based on her 2021 short film Partir un jour, which won the César Award for Best Fiction Short Film at the 48th ceremony. It stars Juliette Armanet, Bastien Bouillon, François Rollin, Tewfik Jallab, Dominique Blanc, Mhamed Arezki, Pierre-Antoine Billon, and Amandine Dewasmes.

The film had its world premiere as the Opening Film of the 2025 Cannes Film Festival on 13 May 2025 and was released theatrically in France on the same day by Pathé.

== Premise ==
A rising chef must return to her hometown after her father suffers a heart attack then gets reunited with her teenage crush.

== Cast ==
- Juliette Armanet as Cécile
- Bastien Bouillon as Raphaël
- François Rollin as Gérard
- Tewfik Jallab as Sofiane
- Dominique Blanc as Fanfan
- Mhamed Arezki as Heddy
- Pierre-Antoine Billon as Richard
- Amandine Dewasmes as Nathalie

== Production ==
Principal photography took place from 3 June to 17 July 2024 in Strasbourg, Colmar, and Saint-Dizier, France.

== Release ==
Leave One Day had its world premiere as the opening film at the 2025 Cannes Film Festival, making it the first directorial debut film to open the festival. It was released theatrically in France on the same day by Pathé. It was also screened in Open Air Premiere Programme at the 31st Sarajevo Film Festival in August 2025. It will also be showcased at the 53rd Norwegian International Film Festival in Main Programme section on 17 August 2025.

== Reception ==
=== Box office ===
The film had 651k admissions at the French box office, grossing $5.3 million.

=== Critical response ===
On the French review aggregator AlloCiné, the film has an average review score of 3.6 out of 5 based on 34 critics. On the review aggregator website Rotten Tomatoes, 57% of 28 critics' reviews are positive. Metacritic, which uses a weighted average, assigned the film a score of 41 out of 100, based on 10 critics, indicating "mixed or average" reviews.
