= Walid Mattar =

Tunisian film director

- Born: Waleed; June 7, 1980 (age 45); Tunis
- Citizenship: Tunisia
- Occupations: film director, Screenwriter

Walid Mattar (born June 7, 1980) is a Tunisian film director.

== Biography ==
He grew up in Tunis and moved to France at the age of 23. Interested in film from an early age, he joined the Tunisian Federation of Amateur Cinematographers when he was just 13. He made a number of short films before directing his first feature-length movie in 2017, titled Vent du Nord (North Wind).
