= Juliette Armanet =

French singer (born 1984)

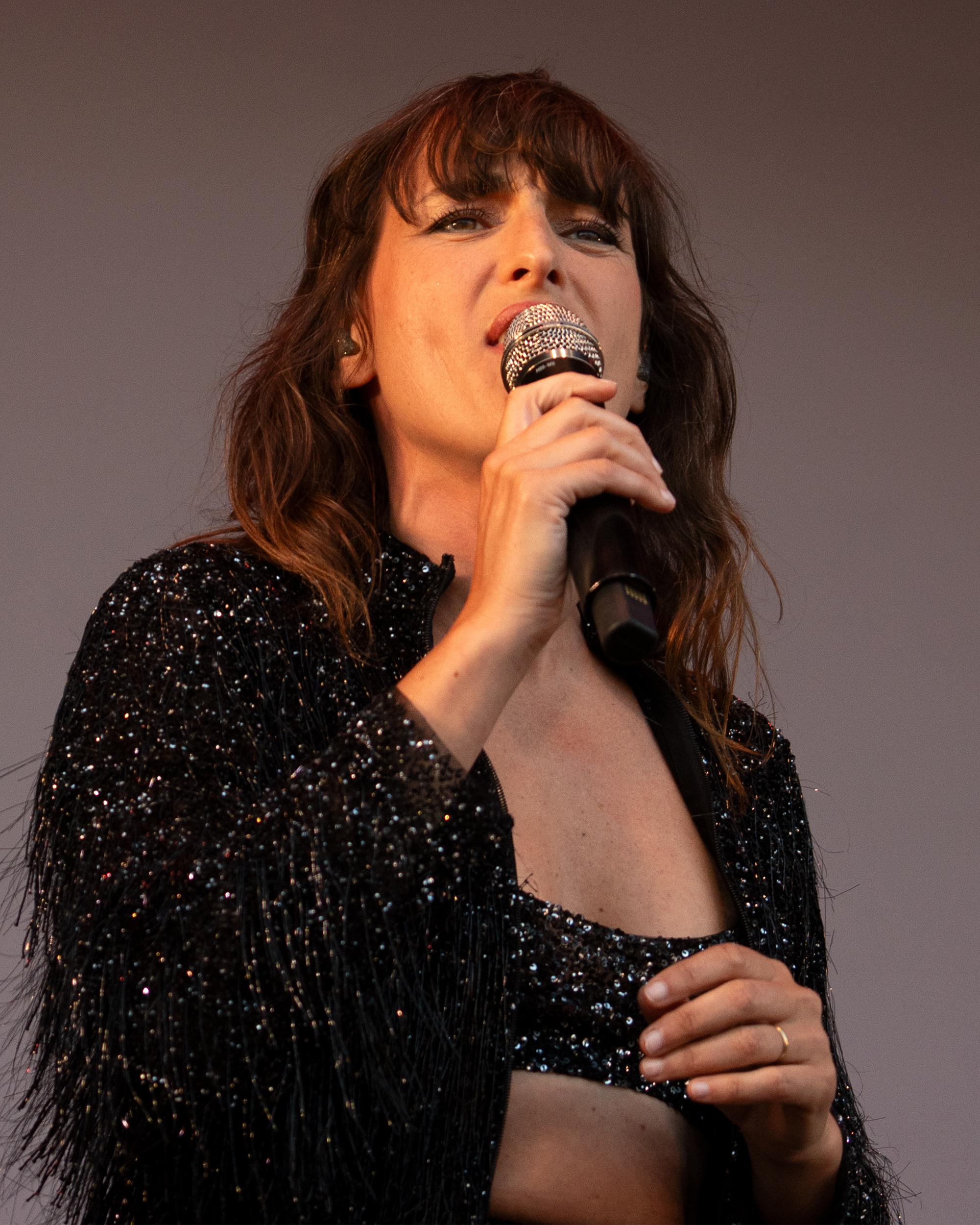
- Armanet performing live in May 2023

Background information
- Born: Juliette Anne Solange Armanet; 4 March 1984 (age 42); Lille, France
- Occupation: Singer-songwriter
- Years active: 2014–present
- Labels: Barclay; Universal Music

Juliette Anne Solange Armanet (French pronunciation: [ʒyljɛt aʁmanɛ]; born 4 March 1984) is a French singer and songwriter.

She won the Album Révélation of the Year in 2018 at the Victoires de la Musique for "Petite amie".

== Discography ==
=== Studio albums ===
Year	Album	Charts			Certification
Year	Album	FRA	BEL (Wa)	SWI	Certification
2017	Petite amie: Released: 7 April 2017; Label: Barclay	15	29	63	SNEP: Double Platinum
2021	Brûler le feu: Released: 19 November 2021; Label: Romance Musique	10	22	21	SNEP: Platinum
2022	Brûler le feu 2: Released: 4 November 2022; Label: Romance Musique	—	18	—	

=== EPs ===
Year	EP
2016	Cavalier seule: Released: 29 April 2016; Label: Barclay

=== Singles ===
Year	Title	Charts		Certification	Album
Year	Title	FRA	BEL (Wa)	Certification	Album
2014	"L'amour en solitaire"	146	— (Note: "L'amour en solitaire" did not enter the Wallonian Ultratop 50, but peaked at number 28 on the Ultratip chart.)	SNEP: Gold	Petite amie
2016	"Manque d'amour"	—	—		Cavalier seule and Petite amie
2018	"L'Indien"	—	— (Note: "L'Indien" did not enter the Wallonian Ultratop 50, but peaked at number 20 on the Ultratip chart.)	SNEP: Gold	Petite amie
2018	"À la folie"	—	—	SNEP: Gold	Petite amie
2021	"Le dernier jour du disco"	42	48	SNEP: Platinum	Brûler le feu
2021	"L'Èpine"	—	—		Brûler le feu
2021	"Qu'importe"	—	—		Brûler le feu

=== Other charted songs ===
Year	Title	Charts	Album
Year	Title	FRA	Album
2016	"Corail" (Julien Doré featuring Juliette Armanet)	143	&

== Filmography ==
=== Film ===
Year	Title	Role	Notes
2025	Leave One Day	Cécile	
2025	Out of Love	Suzanne	Les enfants vont bien. It will compete for Crystal Globe at the KVIFF.

=== Television ===
Year	Title	Role	Notes
2023	Drag Race France	Herself	Guest judge (Season 2); Episode: "The Musidrag"
2025	Carême	Germaine de Staël	1 episode
