= Kamal Lazraq =

Moroccan filmmaker

- Born: 1984; Casablanca, Morocco
- Education: La Fémis, 2011
- Notable work: Hounds (film)

Kamal Lazraq (Arabic: كمال لزرق; born 1984) is a Moroccan filmmaker.

== Early life and education ==
Kamal Lazraq was born in Casablanca in 1984, where he was also raised. He moved to Paris in 2003, where he studied political science.

Seeking to pursue a career in filmmaking, Lazraq gained admission to La Fémis in 2007 without extensive prior experience. During his studies, he made several short films. His 2011 graduation project, Drari, was filmed in Casablanca with non-professional actors. He cited his move to Paris as a pivotal moment, and his access to a wider variety of films in Paris contrasted with the limited options in Casablanca. In an interview for Cannes, Lazraq recalls Ingmar Bergman’s Autumn Sonata being his "first shock, something that make me understand all the emotional power there could be in cinema".

== Career ==
Lazraq's graduation project, Drari, won the second prize in the Cinéfondation category at the 2011 Cannes Film Festival, as well as the Grand Prix for short films at the Entrevues Belfort Film Festival. Following this success, he directed L'Homme au chien (Moul Lkelb) in 2014, also filmed in Casablanca. Lazraq released his first feature film, Hounds, in 2023.

== Filmography ==
- Drari (2011)
- Moul Lkelb (2014)
- Hounds (2023)
