= The Shameless (2024 film) =

2024 romantic crime drama film by Konstantin Bojanov

- Promotional release poster
- Directed by: Konstantin Bojanov
- Written by: Konstantin Bojanov
- Starring: Anasuya Sengupta; Omara Shetty
- Cinematography: Gabriel Lobos
- Edited by: Tom Lin
- Music by: Petar Dundakov
- Release date: 17 May 2024 (Cannes)
- Running time: 115 minutes
- Countries: India; Switzerland; France; Bulgaria; Taiwan
- Language: Hindi

The Shameless is a 2024 Hindi-language romantic crime drama film directed and written by Konstantin Bojanov. It premiered at the 2024 Cannes Film Festival.

== Plot ==
Renuka escapes from a brothel in Delhi after killing a police officer. She starts a romance with Devika, a 17-year-old girl, after seeking refuge in a devadasi community in southern India.

== Cast ==
- Anasuya Sengupta as Renuka
- Omara as Devika

== Production ==
Bojanov acquired the film rights to William Dalrymple's Nine Lives: In Search of the Sacred in Modern India. Bojanov planned on making a documentary based on four stories in the book. Bojanov toured India and started filming in Karnataka in 2014. He planned on using the footage to obtain financing for a feature-length documentary.

Bojanov transformed the project away from being a documentary due to the difficulty of making a film in three languages and that it would be "impossible unless I moved to India". He considered making an animated film due to difficulties obtaining financial support. He later abandoned that idea, but met Anasuya Sengupta, a character visualizer and production designer, and cast her to play the lead role. It took over eight months for the two lead roles to be cast.

Frederic Corvez and Maeva Savinien obtained $868,000 in financing for the film from Klas Film, House on Fire, and Akka Films. Additional financing was obtained from The Production Headquarters. The film was shot in Kathmandu, Nepal, as filming in India cost more after the COVID-19 pandemic.

== Release ==
The Shameless was shown at the 2024 Cannes Film Festival in the Un Certain Regard section on 17 May 2024. One of Bojanov's previous films, Avé, was also shown at Cannes. The film has been selected for the MAMI Mumbai Film Festival 2024 under the Focus South Asia section.

== Reception ==
=== Critical response ===
On review aggregator Rotten Tomatoes, the film holds an approval rating of 57% based on 7 reviews, with an average rating of 5/10.

A review in Variety noted, "A remarkable lead performance illuminates radical visions of Indian womanhood" while Screen Rant wrote, "While the plot becomes rather too overwrought for its own good – perhaps a result of the being in development since 2016 – Sengupta is never less than compelling in her first screen role."

A positive review in CineEuropa stated, "Despite the punchy opening shots, promising more dynamics, the charismatic protagonist and the brave portrayal of a lesbian romance in an Indian setting, which feels like a breakthrough, The Shameless relies on a conventional fable-like plot that might become tedious at times, given its predictability as well – it's clear to everyone that such a story cannot end well. But there is more to it." In Review Online was very critical of the overall production, and wrote, "The Shameless is overstuffed, hurdling from plot point to plot point with no attention to subtlety, character development, or plausible behavior."

=== Accolades ===
Award	Ceremony date	Category	Recipient(s)	Result	Ref.
Cannes Film Festival	24 May 2024	Un Certain Regard	The Shameless	Nominated	
Cannes Film Festival	24 May 2024	Un Certain Regard – Best Performance (Note: Shared with Abou Sangare for The Story of Souleymane.)	Anasuya Sengupta	Won	
