= Norah (film) =

- Arabic: نورة
- Directed by: Tawfik Alzaidi
- Written by: Tawfik Alzaidi
- Produced by: Tawfik Alzaidi
- Starring: Yagoub Alfarhan; Abdullah Alsadhan; Maria Bahrawi
- Cinematography: Shaun Harley Lee
- Edited by: Mounir Soussi
- Music by: Omar Fadel
- Production companies: Black Sugar pictures Nebras Films
- Distributed by: Front Row Filmed Entertainment
- Release dates: 5 December 2023 (Red Sea); 23 May 2024 (Cannes)
- Running time: 94 minutes
- Country: Saudi Arabia
- Language: Arabic

Norah (Arabic: نورة) is a 2023 Saudi Arabian film written, directed and produced by Tawfik Alzaidi. It stars Yagoub Alfarhan, Maria Bahrawi and Abdullah Alsadhan. It is the first Saudi movie to be shot entirely at Al Ula.

The film had its world premiere at the third edition of the Red Sea International Film Festival in December 2023. It was also the first Saudi film to be selected for the Cannes Film Festival as a part of the Un Certain Regard competition, where it was screened on 23 May 2024.

The film was produced through a fund award from the Daw Film Competition by the Film Commission under the Saudi Arabian Ministry of Culture and support from the Red Sea International Film Festival and Film AlUla.

== Plot ==
The film's storyline revolves around Nader, an artist who gives up his passion for art to teach children in a remote village in western Saudi Arabia, and Norah, who lives an independent life with her younger brother Nayef after the death of their parents in a road accident when she was young. The movie explores the relationship between Nader and Norah on their journey of artistic discovery.

== Cast ==
- Yagoub Alfarhan as Nader
- Maria Bahrawi as Norah
- Abdullah Alsadhan as Abu Salem
- Aixa Kay as Munifa
- Abdulrahman Alwafi as Naif

== Awards ==
Norah’s script won a fund award from the Daw Film Competition by the Saudi Film Commission and Saudi Arabian Ministry of Culture in September 2019. It also won the Best Saudi Feature Film Award at the 2023 Red Sea International Film Festival (Third Edition).

== Accolades ==
Award	Ceremony date	Category	Recipient(s)	Result	Ref.
Cannes Film Festival	24 May 2024	Un Certain Regard	Tawfik Alzaidi	Nominated	
Cannes Film Festival	24 May 2024	Un Certain Regard – Special Mention	Tawfik Alzaidi	Won	
