= 2024 Cannes Film Festival =

- Official poster of the 77th Cannes Film Festival featuring a still image from the movie Rhapsody in August by Akira Kurosawa (1991)
- Opening film: The Second Act
- Location: Cannes, France
- Founded: 1946
- Awards: Palme d'Or: Anora
- Hosted by: Camille Cottin
- Artistic director: Thierry Frémaux
- No. of films: 22 (In Competition)
- Festival date: 14–25 May 2024
- Website: festival-cannes.com/en

Cannes Film Festival
- 2025 2023

The 77th annual Cannes Film Festival took place from 14 to 25 May 2024. American filmmaker and actress Greta Gerwig served as jury president for the main competition. American filmmaker Sean Baker won the Palme d'Or, the festival's top prize, for the comedy-drama film Anora.

The official poster for the festival featuring a still image from the movie Rhapsody in August (1991) by Akira Kurosawa, selected for the 44th edition, was designed by Hartland Villa. French actress Camille Cottin hosted the opening and closing ceremonies.

During the festival, three Honorary Palme d'Or were awarded: the first was awarded to Meryl Streep during the festival's opening ceremony; the second was awarded to Studio Ghibli; and the third was awarded to George Lucas during the festival's closing ceremony.

Few days before the opening ceremony, festival workers called for a general strike. The Broke Behind the Screens (Sous les écrans la dèche) collective made public a complaint about the precarious nature of film festival work.

Following the official announcement of The Seed of the Sacred Fig's selection for the main competition, Iranian filmmaker Mohammad Rasoulof was sentenced to eight years in prison as well as flogging, a fine, and confiscation of his property, on the charge of "propaganda against the regime." Cast and crew were interrogated and pressured to convince Rasoulof to withdraw the film from the festival. Shortly after, Rasoulof and some crew members managed to flee from Iran to Europe, and attended the film's world premiere on 24 May 2024. On the red carpet, Rasoulof held up images of stars Soheila Golestani and Missagh Zareh, who were unable to leave Iran for the premiere, and had their passport confiscated. The film received a 12-minute standing ovation, while cast and crew protested in solidarity with Iranian women fight for rights.

The festival opened with French comedy-film The Second Act by Quentin Dupieux.

== Juries ==
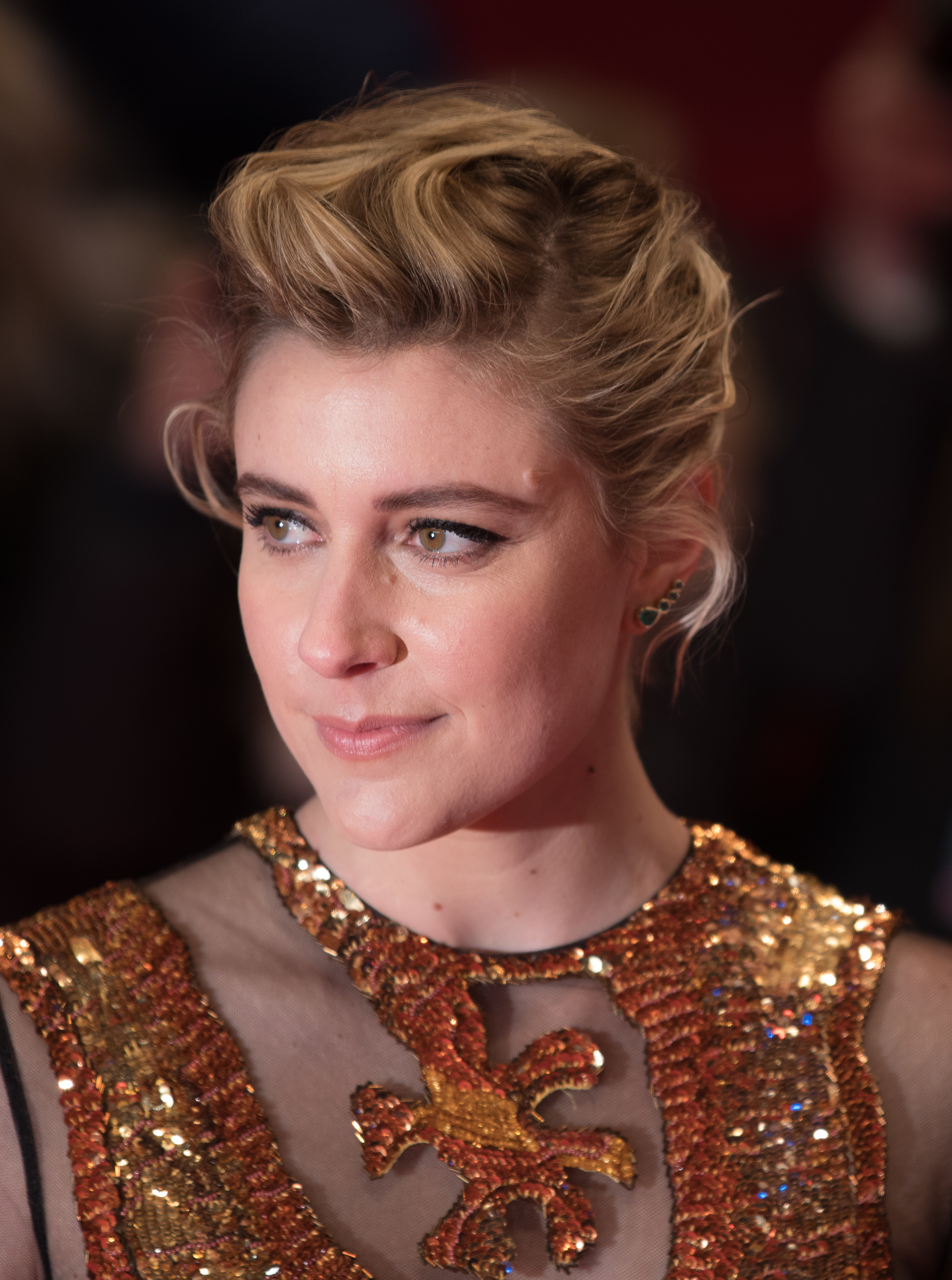
Greta Gerwig, Main Competition jury president

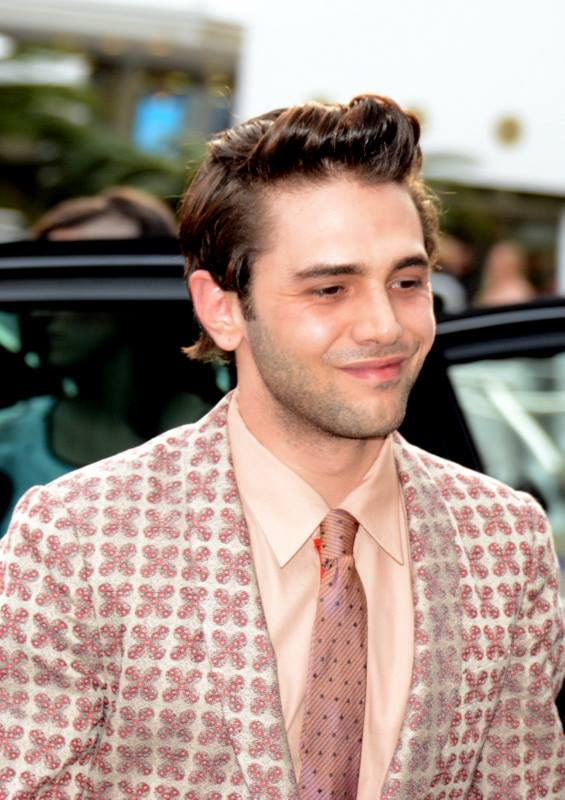
Xavier Dolan, Un Certain Regard jury president

=== Main Competition ===
- Greta Gerwig, American actress and filmmaker – Jury President
- J. A. Bayona, Spanish filmmaker
- Ebru Ceylan, Turkish actress and screenwriter
- Pierfrancesco Favino, Italian actor and producer
- Lily Gladstone, American actress
- Eva Green, French actress
- Hirokazu Kore-eda, Japanese filmmaker and producer
- Nadine Labaki, Lebanese actress and filmmaker
- Omar Sy, French actor

=== Un Certain Regard ===
- Xavier Dolan, Canadian filmmaker and actor – Jury President
- Maïmouna Doucouré, French-Senegalese filmmaker
- Asmae El Moudir, Moroccan filmmaker and producer
- Vicky Krieps, Luxembourgish-German actress
- Todd McCarthy, American filmmaker, writer and film critic
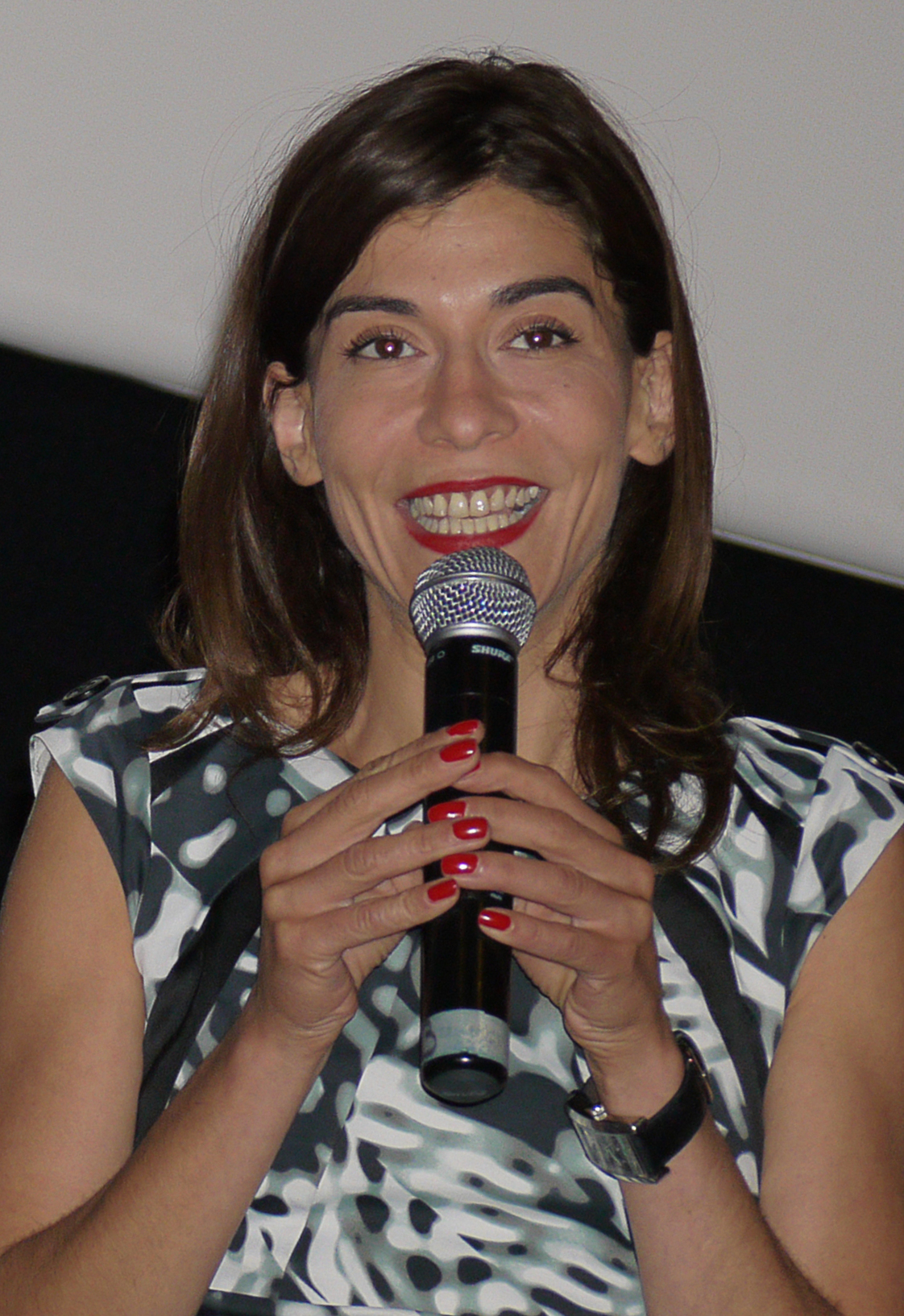
  Lubna Azabal, Cinéfondation and Short Films Competition jury president

=== Cinéfondation and Short Films Competition ===
- Lubna Azabal, Belgian actress – Jury President
- Marie-Castille Mention-Schaar, French filmmaker and producer
- Paolo Moretti, Italian programmer
- Claudine Nougaret, French producer
- Vladimir Perišić, Serbian filmmaker

=== Caméra d'Or ===
- Baloji, Belgian-Congolese singer and filmmaker – Jury Co-president
- Emmanuelle Béart, French actress – Jury Co-president
- Pascal Buron, French TSF board member
- Nathalie Chifflet, French journalist
- Gilles Porte, French cinematographer and filmmaker
- Zoé Wittock, Belgian filmmaker

=== L'Œil d'Or ===
- Nicolas Philibert, French filmmaker and actor – Jury President
- Dyana Gaye, French-Senegalese filmmaker
- Elise Jalladeau, French producer and executive director of the Thessaloniki International Film Festival
- Mina Kavani, Iranian-French actress
- Francis Legault, Canadian filmmaker and director at Ici Radio-Canada Première

=== Critics' Week ===
- Sylvie Pialat, French producer – Jury President (Note: Spanish filmmaker Rodrigo Sorogoyen was set to be president but he resigned from the jury for "personal circumstances" days before the festival. Pialat overtook as president and Kaltenbäck was added.)
- Ben Croll, Canadian film critic and journalist
- Iris Kaltenbäck, French filmmaker
- Virginie Surdej, Belgian cinematographer
- Eliane Umuhire, Rwandan actress

=== Queer Palm ===
- Lukas Dhont, Belgian filmmaker – Jury President
- Hugo Bardin, French singer and director
- Sophie Letourneur, French filmmaker
- Juliana Rojas, Brazilian filmmaker
- Jad Salfiti, British-Palestinian journalist

== Official Selection ==
=== In Competition ===
The following films were selected to compete for the Palme d'Or:

| English Title | Original Title | Director(s) | Production Country |
|---|---|---|---|
| All We Imagine as Light | പ്രഭയായ് നിനച്ചതെല്ലം | Payal Kapadia | France, India, Netherlands, Luxembourg, Italy |
| Anora | | Sean Baker | United States |
| The Apprentice | | Ali Abbasi | Canada, Denmark, Ireland, United States |
| Beating Hearts | L'Amour Ouf | Gilles Lellouche | France, Belgium |
| Bird (QP) | | Andrea Arnold | United Kingdom, France, Germany, United States |
| Caught by the Tides | 风流一代 | Jia Zhangke | China |
| Emilia Pérez (QP) | | Jacques Audiard | France |
| The Girl with the Needle | Pigen med nålen | Magnus von Horn | Denmark, Poland, Sweden |
| Grand Tour | | Miguel Gomes | Portugal, France, Italy |
| Kinds of Kindness | | Yorgos Lanthimos | Ireland, United Kingdom, United States |
| Limonov: The Ballad | | Kirill Serebrennikov | France, Italy, Spain |
| Marcello Mio (QP) | | Christophe Honoré | France, Italy |
| Megalopolis | | Francis Ford Coppola | United States |
| The Most Precious of Cargoes | La plus précieuse des marchandises | Michel Hazanavicius | France, Belgium |
| Motel Destino (QP) | | Karim Aïnouz | Brazil, France, Germany |
| Oh, Canada | | Paul Schrader | United States |
| Parthenope | | Paolo Sorrentino | Italy, France |
| The Seed of the Sacred Fig | دانه انجیر مقدس | Mohammad Rasoulof | Iran, Germany, France |
| The Shrouds | | David Cronenberg | France, Canada |
| The Substance | | Coralie Fargeat | France, United Kingdom, United States |
| Three Kilometres to the End of the World (QP) | Trei Kilometri Pana La Capatul Lumii | Emanuel Pârvu | Romania |
| Wild Diamond (CdO) | Diamant brut | Agathe Riedinger | France |

(CdO) indicates film eligible for the Caméra d'Or as a feature directorial debut.
(QP) indicates film in competition for the Queer Palm.

=== Un Certain Regard ===
The following films were selected to compete in the Un Certain Regard section:

| English Title | Original Title | Director(s) | Production Country |
|---|---|---|---|
| Armand (CdO) | | Halfdan Ullmann Tøndel | Norway, Netherlands, Germany, Sweden |
| Black Dog | 狗阵 | Guan Hu | China |
| The Damned | Les Damnés | Roberto Minervini | Italy, Belgium, United States |
| Dog on Trial (CdO) | Le Procès du chien | Laetitia Dosch | Switzerland, France |
| Flow | Straume | Gints Zilbalodis | Belgium, France, Latvia |
| Holy Cow (CdO) | Vingt Dieux! | Louise Courvoisier | France |
| The Kingdom (CdO) | Le Royaume | Julien Colonna | France |
| My Sunshine (QP) | ぼくのお日さま | Hiroshi Okuyama | Japan |
| Niki (CdO) | | Céline Sallette | France |
| Norah (CdO) | نورة | Tawfik Alzaidi | Saudi Arabia |
| On Becoming a Guinea Fowl | | Rungano Nyoni | Ireland, United Kingdom, United States, Zambia |
| Santosh | | Sandhya Suri | India, France, Germany, United Kingdom |
| September Says (CdO) | | Ariane Labed | France, Germany, Greece, Ireland, United Kingdom |
| The Shameless (QP) | | Konstantin Bojanov | India, Bulgaria, France, Switzerland, Taiwan |
| Souleymane's Story | L'Histoire de Souleymane | Boris Lojkine | France |
| The Village Next to Paradise (CdO) | | Mo Harawe | Austria, France, Somalia |
| Viet and Nam (QP) | Trong lòng đất | Minh Quý Trương | Vietnam, Philippines, Singapore, France, Netherlands |
| When the Light Breaks (opening film) | Ljósbrot | Rúnar Rúnarsson | Iceland, Netherlands, Croatia, France |

(CdO) indicates film eligible for the Caméra d'Or as a feature directorial debut.
(QP) indicates film in competition for the Queer Palm.

=== Out of Competition ===
Besides the world premieres of Hollywood, French and Chinese blockbusters, alongside the Midnight Screenings section, the festival also screened four Studio Ghibli short films at the Grand Théâtre Lumière, three of them never screened outside of Japan before, as a part of the celebration for Ghibli's Honorary Palme d'Or. The following films were selected to be screened out of competition:

| English Title | Original Title | Director(s) | Production Country |
|---|---|---|---|
| The Count of Monte Cristo | Le Comte de Monte-Cristo | Alexandre De La Patellière and Matthieu Delaporte | France |
| Furiosa: A Mad Max Saga | | George Miller | Australia, United States |
| Horizon: An American Saga – Chapter 1 | | Kevin Costner | United States |
| Rumours | | Guy Maddin, Evan Johnson and Galen Johnson | Canada, Germany |
| The Second Act (opening film) | Le Deuxième Acte | Quentin Dupieux | France |
| She's Got No Name | 醬園弄 | Peter Chan | China, Hong Kong |
Midnight Screenings
| The Balconettes (QP) | Les Femmes au Balcon | Noémie Merlant | France |
| I, the Executioner | 베테랑 2 | Ryoo Seung-wan | South Korea |
| The Surfer | | Lorcan Finnegan | Australia, Ireland |
| Twilight of the Warriors: Walled In | 九龍城寨之圍城 | Soi Cheang | Hong Kong |
Studio Ghibli's Honorary Palme d'Or Celebrations
| Boro the Caterpillar (2018) | 毛虫のボロ | Hayao Miyazaki | Japan |
| Looking for a Home (2006) | やどさがし | Hayao Miyazaki | Japan |
| Mei and the Baby Cat Bus (2002) | めいとこねこバス | Hayao Miyazaki | Japan |
| Mr. Dough and the Egg Princess (2010) | パン種とタマゴ姫 | Hayao Miyazaki | Japan |

(QP) indicates film in competition for the Queer Palm.

=== Cannes Premiere ===
The following films were selected to be screened in the Cannes Premiere section:

| English Title | Original Title | Director(s) | Production Country |
|---|---|---|---|
| Being Maria | Maria | Jessica Palud | France |
| Everybody Loves Touda | الجميع يحب تودة | Nabil Ayouch | Belgium, Denmark, France, Morocco, Netherlands, Norway |
| It's Not Me | C'est Pas Moi | Leos Carax | France |
| Jim's Story | Le Roman de Jim | Arnaud Larrieu and Jean-Marie Larrieu | France |
| The Marching Band | En Fanfare | Emmanuel Courcol | France |
| Meeting with Pol Pot | Rendez-vous avec Pol Pot | Rithy Panh | France, Cambodia, Taiwan, Qatar, Turkey |
| Misericordia (QP) | Miséricorde | Alain Guiraudie | France, Portugal, Spain |
| To Live, to Die, to Live Again (QP) | Vivre, Mourir, Renaître | Gaël Morel | France |

(QP) indicates film in competition for the Queer Palm.

=== Special Screenings ===
The following films were selected to be screened in the Special Screenings section:

| English Title | Original Title | Director(s) | Production Country |
|---|---|---|---|
| An Ordinary Case | Le fil | Daniel Auteuil | France |
| An Unfinished Film (ŒdO) | 一部未完成的电影 | Lou Ye | Singapore, Germany |
| The Art of Joy (series) | L'arte della gioia | Valeria Golino and Nicolangelo Gelormini | Italy |
| The Belle from Gaza (ŒdO) (QP) | La Belle de Gaza | Yolande Zauberman | France |
| Ernest Cole: Lost and Found (ŒdO) | | Raoul Peck | France, United States |
| Filmlovers! (ŒdO) | Spectateurs! | Arnaud Desplechin | France |
| Into the Wonderwoods | Angelo dans la forêt mystérieuse | Vincent Paronnaud and Alexis Ducord | France, Luxembourg |
| The Invasion (ŒdO) | | Sergei Loznitsa | France, Netherlands, Ukraine, United States |
| Learn (ŒdO) | Apprendre | Claire Simon | France |
| Lula (ŒdO) | | Oliver Stone and Rob Wilson | United States, Brazil |
| Nasty – More Than Just Tennis (ŒdO) | Nasty | Tudor Giurgiu, Cristian Pascariu and Tudor D. Popescu | Romania |
| Savages | Sauvages | Claude Barras | Switzerland, France, Belgium |

(ŒdO) indicates film eligible for the L'Œil d'or as documentary.
(QP) indicates film in competition for the Queer Palm.

=== Short Films Competition ===
Out of 4.420 entries, the following eleven short films were selected to compete for the Short Film Palme d'Or:

| English Title | Original Title | Director(s) | Production Country |
|---|---|---|---|
| Across the Waters | 在水一方 | Viv Li | China, France |
| Bad for a Moment | Mau Por Um Momento | Daniel Soares | Portugal |
| Les Belles Cicatrices | | Raphaël Jouzeau | France |
| The Man Who Could Not Remain Silent | Čovjek koji nije mogao šutjeti | Nebojša Slijepčević | Croatia, France, Slovenia, Bulgaria |
| Ootid | Ootidé | Razumaitė Eglė | Lithuania |
| On The Way | Rruges | Samir Karahoda | Kosovo |
| Perfectly a Strangeness | | Alison McAlpine | Canada, Chile |
| Sanki Yoxsan | | Azer Guliev | Azerbaijan |
| Tea | | Blake Rice | United States |
| Volcelest | | Éric Briche | France |
| Yellow | Amarela | André Hayato Saito | Brazil |

=== Cinéfondation ===
The Cinéfondation (or La Cinéf) section focuses on films made by students at film schools. The Cannes Film Festival allocates a €15,000 grant for the winner of the First Prize, €11,250 for the winner of the Second Prize and €7,500 for the winner of the Third Prize. The following 18 shorts (14 live-action and 4 animated films) were selected from among the 2,263 films submitted by schools from all over the world:

| English Title | Original Title | Director(s) | School |
|---|---|---|---|
| Banished Love | 将爱放逐 | Xiwen Cong | Beijing Film Academy, China |
| Bunnyhood | | Mansi Maheshwari | NFTS, United Kingdom |
| The Chaos She Left Behind | | Nikos Kolioukos | Aristotle University of Thessaloniki, Greece |
| Crown Man | | Yohann Abdelnour | ALBA, Lebanon |
| The Deer's Tooth | | Saif Hammash | Dar Al-Kalima University, Palestine |
| Echoes | | Robinson Drossos | ENSAD, France |
| Elevation | Elevación | Gabriel Esdras | University of Guadalajara, Mexico |
| Forest of Echoes | 메아리 | Yoori Lim | Korea National University of Arts, South Korea |
| In Spirito | | Nicolò Folin | Centro Sperimentale di Cinematografia, Italy |
| It'll Pass | Praeis | Dovydas Drakšas | London Film School, United Kingdom |
| It's Not Time For Pop | | Amit Vaknin | Tel Aviv University, Israel |
| Out of the Window Through the Wall | | Asya Segalovich | Columbia University, United States |
| Sunflowers Were the First Ones to Know... | | Chidananda S Naik | FTII Pune, India |
| Terminal | | East Elliott | NYU, United States |
| Three (QP) | 三 | Amie Song | Columbia University, United States |
| Us and Them | Mauvais Coton | Nicolas Dumaret | La Fémis, France |
| Weeds | Plevel | Pola Kazak | FAMU, Czech Republic |
| Withered Blossoms | | Lionel Seah | AFTRS, Australia |

(QP) indicates film in competition for the Queer Palm.

=== Cannes Classics ===
The first part (3 hours and 40 minutes) of the new restoration print of Abel Gance's silent masterpiece Napoléon (1927), edited by Georges Mourier in association with the Cinémathèque Française and support of the CNC, opened the Cannes Classics section on 14 May. The following films were selected to be screened:

| English Title | Original Title | Director(s) | Production Country |
Restored prints
| Army of Shadows (1969) | L'Armée des ombres | Jean-Pierre Melville | France, Italy |
| Bona (1980) | | Lino Brocka | Philippines |
| Bye Bye Brazil (1979) | Bye Bye Brasil | Carlos Diegues | Brazil, France, Argentina |
| The Churning (1976) | Manthan | Shyam Benegal | India |
| The Declic Years (1984) | Les Années Déclic | Raymond Depardon | France |
| Four Nights of a Dreamer (1971) | Quatre nuits d'un rêveur | Robert Bresson | France, Italy |
| Gilda (1946) | | Charles Vidor | United States |
| Johnny Got His Gun (1971) | | Dalton Trumbo | United States |
| Law and Order (1969) | | Frederick Wiseman | United States |
| Napoléon (1927) (opening film) | Napoléon vu par Abel Gance | Abel Gance | France |
| Paris, Texas (1984) | | Wim Wenders | West Germany, France |
| Rosaura at 10 O'Clock (1958) | Rosaura a las diez | Mario Soffici | Argentina |
| Shanghai Blues (1984) | 上海之夜 | Tsui Hark | Hong Kong |
| The Sea Rose (1947) | La rose de la mer | Jacques de Baroncelli | France |
| Seven Samurai (1954) | 七人の侍 | Akira Kurosawa | Japan |
| Slap the Monster on Page One (1972) | Sbatti il mostro in prima pagina | Marco Bellocchio | France, Italy |
| The Sugarland Express (1974) | | Steven Spielberg | United States |
| Tasio (1984) | | Montxo Armendáriz | Spain |
| The Umbrellas of Cherbourg (1964) | Les Parapluies de Cherbourg | Jacques Demy | France, West Germany |
World Cinema Project
| Camp de Thiaroye (1988) | | Ousmane Sembène and Thierno Faty Sow | Senegal, Algeria, Tunisia |
Tribute Events
| Exposé du Film Annonce du Film "Scénario" | | Jean-Luc Godard | France, Japan |
| Scénarios | | Jean-Luc Godard | France, Japan |
Documentaries about Cinema
| Elizabeth Taylor: The Lost Tapes (ŒdO) | | Nanette Burstein | United States |
| Faye (ŒdO) | | Laurent Bouzereau | United States |
| François Truffaut, My Life, a Screenplay (ŒdO) | François Truffaut, le Scénario de Ma Vie | David Teboul | France |
| Hayao Miyazaki and the Heron (ŒdO) | | Kaku Arakawa | Japan |
| Jacques Demy, The Pink and the Black (ŒdO) | Jacques Demy, le Rose et le Noir | Florence Platarets | France |
| Jacques Rozier: From One to Another (ŒdO) | Jacques Rozier, d'une Vague à l'Autre | Emmanuel Barnault | France |
| Jim Henson Idea Man (ŒdO) | | Ron Howard | United States |
| Le Siècle de Costa-Gavras (episode 3): La Vérité est Révolutionnaire – l'Aveu | | Yannick Kergoat | France |
| Olympiques! La France des jeux (ŒdO) | | Mickaël Gamrasni | France |
| Once Upon a Time Michel Legrand (CdO) | Il Était Une Fois Michel Legrand | David Hertzog Dessites | France |
| Walking in the Movies (ŒdO) | 영화 청년, 동호 | Lyang Kim | South Korea |

(ŒdO) indicates film eligible for the L'Œil d'or as documentary.

=== Cinéma de la Plage ===
The Cinéma de la Plage section line-up includes classics films, commemorations and world premieres of new productions at the Cannes's Plage Macé. Tales from Earthsea (2006) and Porco Rosso (1992) will be screened as part of Studio Ghibli Honorary Palme d'Or commemorations, alongside the commemoration of the 50th anniversary of Brian De Palma's Phantom of the Paradise (1974). The following films were selected to be screened:

| English Title | Original Title | Director(s) | Production Country |
|---|---|---|---|
| After Hours (1985) | | Martin Scorsese | United States |
| Armour of God II: Operation Condor (1991) | 飛鷹計劃 | Jackie Chan | Hong Kong |
| A Boat in the Garden | Slocum et Moi | Jean-François Laguionie | Luxemburg, France |
| Days of Glory (2006) | Indigènes | Rachid Bouchareb | France, Morocco, Belgium, Algeria |
| Exils (2004) | | Tony Gatlif | France |
| Me Too (short film) | Moi aussi | Judith Godrèche | France |
| My Way (ŒdO) | | Lisa Azuelos and Thierry Teston | France |
| Nine Queens (2000) | Nueve reinas | Fabián Bielinsky | Argentina |
| Phantom of the Paradise (1974) | | Brian De Palma | United States |
| Porco Rosso (1992) | 紅の豚 | Hayao Miyazaki | Japan |
| Silex and the City | | Jul | France |
| Tales from Earthsea (2006) | ゲド戦記 | Gorô Miyazaki | Japan |
| Transmitzvah | | Daniel Burman | Argentina |
Restored print
| Trainspotting (1996) | | Danny Boyle | United Kingdom |

(ŒdO) indicates film eligible for the L'Œil d'or as documentary.

=== Immersive Competition ===
The Immersive Competition of the Festival de Cannes will be a new competition dedicated to immersive works. Besides the eight immersive work selected for the competition, six non-competitive productions will be featured at the exhibition exploring the evolution of the medium and drawing parallels between virtual reality, virtual production, cinema and collective storytelling. The following films were selected to be screened:

| English Title | Original Title | Director(s) | Production Country |
In Competition
| Colored | Noire | Tania de Montaigne, Stéphane Foenkinos and Pierre-Alain Giraud | France, Taiwan |
| En Amour | | Claire Bardainne, Adrien Mondot and Laurent Bardainne | France |
| Evolver | | Barnaby Steel, Ersin Han Ersin and Robin McNicholas | France, United Kingdom, United States |
| Human Violins: Prelude (multi-user version) | | Ioana Mischie | France, Romania |
| Maya: The Birth of a Superhero | | Poulomi Basu and CJ Clarke | France, United Kingdom, United States |
| The Roaming | | Mathieu Pradat | Canada, France, Luxembourg |
| Telos I | | Dorotea Saykaly and Emil Dam Seidel | Canada, Denmark, Sweden |
| Traversing the Mist | 穿越霧中 | Chou Tung-Yen | Taiwan |
Out of Competition
| Battlescar | | Martin Allais and Nico Casavecchia | France, United States |
| Emperor | | Marion Burger and Ilan J. Cohen | France, Germany |
| Gloomy Eyes | | Fernando Maldonado and Jorge Tereso | Argentina, France, United States |
| Missing Pictures: Naomi Kawasi | | Clément Deneux | France, Luxembourg, South Korea, Taiwan, United Kingdom |
| Notes on Blindness | | Arnaud Colinart, Amaury La Burthe, Peter Middleton and James Spinney | France, United Kingdom |
| Spheres | | Eliza McNitt | France, United States |

== Parallel sections ==
=== Critics' Week (Semaine de la critique) ===
The Critics' Week is a parallel selection dedicated to first and second films. The following films were selected to be screened in competition:

| English Title | Original Title | Director(s) | Production Country |
In Competition
| Baby (QP) | | Marcelo Caetano | Brazil, France, Netherlands |
| Block Pass (CdO) (QP) | La Pampa | Antoine Chevrollier | France |
| Blue Sun Palace (CdO) | | Constance Tsang | United States |
| The Brink of Dreams (ŒdO) | رفعت عيني للسما | Nada Riyadh and Ayman El Amir | Egypt, France |
| Julie Keeps Quiet (CdO) | Julie zwijgt | Leonardo Van Dijl | Belgium, Sweden |
| Locust (CdO) | 蟲 | KEFF | Taiwan, France, United States |
| Simon of the Mountain (CdO) | Simón de la montaña | Federico Luis | Argentina, Chile, Uruguay |
Special Screenings
| Across the Sea (QP) | La mer au loin | Saïd Hamich Benlarbi | France, Morocco, Belgium, Qatar |
| Animale (closing film) | | Emma Benestan | France, Belgium |
| Ghost Trail (opening film) (CdO) | Les Fantômes | Jonathan Millet | France, Germany, Belgium |
| Queens of Drama (CdO) (QP) | Les Reines du drame | Alexis Langlois | France, Belgium |
Short Films Competition
| Absent | Noksan | Cem Demirer | Turkey |
| Alazar | | Beza Hailu Lemma | Ethiopia, France, Canada |
| Dancing in the Corner | Taniec w Narożniku | Jan Bujnowski | Poland |
| The Girl and The Pot | A Menina e o Pote | Valentina Homem | Brazil |
| Montsouris Park | Montsouris | Guil Sela | France |
| My Senses Are All I Have to Offer (QP) | As Minhas Sensações São Tudo o que Tenho para Oferecer | Isadora Neves Marques | Portugal |
| Radikals | | Arvin Belarmino | Philippines, United States, Bangladesh, France |
| She Stays | Ella se queda | Marinthia Gutiérrez Velazco | Mexico |
| Supersilly | | Veronica Martiradonna | France |
| What We Ask of a Statue is That it Doesn't Move | Αυτο που ζηταμε απο ενα αγαλμα ειναι να μην κινειται | Daphné Hérétakis | Greece, France |
Special Screenings – Short Films
| 1996 | 1996 ou les Malheurs de Solveig | Lucie Borleteau | France |
| Sauna Day (QP) | Sannapäiv | Anna Hints & Tushar Prakash | Estonia |
| Southern Brides (QP) | Las novias del sur | Elena López Riera | Switzerland, Spain |
Special Screenings – 21st Morelia International Film Festival
| Extinction of the Species | Extinción de la especie | Matthew Porterfield, Nicolasa Ruiz | Mexico |
| Ha | | María Almendra Castro Camacho | Mexico |
| The Navel | Xquipi (Ombligo) | Juan Pablo Villalobos Díaz | Mexico |

(CdO) indicates film eligible for the Caméra d'Or as a feature directorial debut.
(ŒdO) indicates film eligible for the L'Œil d'or as documentary.
(QP) indicates film in competition for the Queer Palm.

=== Directors' Fortnight (Quinzaine des cinéastes) ===
In partnership with The Fondation Chantal Akerman, for the first time ever, the audience will award one of the films in the main selection with the "Audience Award" or "Choix du Public". It is the first ever official award presented by the section, since its creation in 1969. The following films were selected to be screened in the Directors' Fortnight (Quinzaine des cinéastes) section:

| English Title | Original Title | Director(s) | Production Country |
Main Selection
| Christmas Eve in Miller's Point | | Tyler Taormina | United States |
| Desert of Namibia | ナミビアの砂漠 | Yôko Yamanaka | Japan |
| East of Noon | شرق ١٢ | Hala Elkoussy | Egypt |
| Eat the Night (QP) | | Caroline Poggi and Jonathan Vinel | France |
| Eephus (CdO) | | Carson Lund | United States, France |
| The Falling Sky (ŒdO) | A queda do céu | Eryk Rocha and Gabriela Carneiro da Cunha | Brazil, France |
| Gazer (CdO) | | Ryan J. Sloan | United States |
| Ghost Cat Anzu | 化け猫あんずちゃん | Yôko Kuno and Nobuhiro Yamashita | Japan, France |
| Good One (CdO) | | India Donaldson | United States |
| In His Own Image | À Son Image | Thierry de Peretti | France |
| The Hyperboreans | Los hiperbóreos | Cristóbal León & Joaquín Cociña | Chile |
| Mongrel (CdO) | 白衣蒼狗 | Chiang Wei Liang and You Qiao Yin | Taiwan, Singapore, France |
| The Other Way Around | Volveréis | Jonás Trueba | Spain, France |
| Plastic Guns (closing film) | Les Pistolets en Plastique | Jean-Christophe Meurisse | France |
| Savanna and the Mountain (ŒdO) | A Savana e a Montanha | Paulo Carneiro | Portugal |
| Sister Midnight (CdO) | | Karan Kandhari | United Kingdom, India, Sweden |
| Something Old, Something New, Something Borrowed | Algo viejo, algo nuevo, algo prestado | Hernán Rosselli | Argentina |
| This Life of Mine (opening film) | Ma Vie ma Gueule | Sophie Fillières | France |
| To a Land Unknown | | Mahdi Fleifel | Palestine, United Kingdom, France, Germany, Netherlands, Greece, Qatar, Saudi Arabia |
| Universal Language | Une Langue universelle | Matthew Rankin | Canada |
| Visiting Hours | La Prisonnière de Bordeaux | Patricia Mazuy | France |
Short Films
| After the Sun | Après le Soleil | Rayane Mcirdi | France, Algeria |
| Antoine, Élise and Léandre | Lés Météos d'Antoine | Jules Follet | France |
| Extremely Short | とても短い | Kōji Yamamura | Japan |
| Immaculata (QP) | | Kim Lêa Sakkal | Germany, Lebanon |
| The Moving Garden | O jardim em movimento | Inês Lima | Portugal |
| Mulberry Fields | Một lần dang dở' | Nguyễn Trung Nghĩa | Vietnam |
| Very Gentle Work | Travail très soigné | Nate Lavey | United States, France |
| When the Land Runs Away | Quando a terra foge | Frederico Lobo | Portugal |
Special Screening
| American Stories: Food, Family and Philosophy | Histoires d'Amérique: Food, Family and Philophy | Chantal Akerman | Belgium |

(CdO) indicates film eligible for the Caméra d'Or as a feature directorial debut.
(ŒdO) indicates film eligible for the L'Œil d'or as documentary.
(QP) indicates film in competition for the Queer Palm.

=== ACID ===
The following films were selected to be screened in the ACID (Association for the Distribution of Independent Cinema) section:

| English Title | Original Title | Director(s) | Production Country |
|---|---|---|---|
| Ce n'est qu'un au revoir | | Guillaume Brac | France |
| Château Rouge | | Hélène Milano | France |
| A Fireland | Un Pays en flammes | Mona Convert | France |
| Fotogenico | | Marcia Romano and Benoit Sabatier | France |
| In Retreat | | Maisam Ali | India, France |
| It Doesn't Matter | | Josh Mond | United States, France |
| Kyuka – Before Summer's End | | Kostis Charamountanis | Greece, North Macedonia |
| Mi Bestia | | Camila Beltrán | Colombia, France |
| Most People Die on Sundays (QP) | Los domingos mueren más personas | Iair Said | Argentina, Italy, Spain |

(QP) indicates film in competition for the Queer Palm.

== Parallel programs ==
=== Cannes Écrans Juniors ===
Cannes Écrans Juniors is a selection of eight international feature films of particular interest to young audiences from age 13. Below are the films featured in this selection:

| English Title | Original Title | Director(s) | Production Country |
|---|---|---|---|
| The Child Who Measured the World | L'Enfant Qui Mesurait Le Monde | Takis Candilis | France, Greece, Belgium |
| Excursion | Ekskurzija | Una Gunjak | Bosnia and Herzegovina, Croatia, Norway, Serbia |
| Girls Will Be Girls | | Shuchi Talati | India, France |
| The Monk and the Gun | | Pawo Choyning Dorji | Bhutan |
| The Other Son | El Otro Hijo | Juan Sebastián Quebrada | Colombia, Argentina, France |
| Valentina or the Serenity | Valentina o la Serenidad | Ángeles Cruz | Mexico |
| Sweet As | | Jub Clerc | Australia |
| Young Hearts | | Anthony Schatteman | Belgium, Netherlands |

=== Cannes Écrans Seniors ===
Cannes Seniors Club takes the spotlight with three premiere screenings for the club's film enthusiasts. Below are the films featured in competition:

| English Title | Original Title | Director(s) | Production Country |
|---|---|---|---|
| Everything In Between | | Nadi Sha | Australia |
| Head South | | Jonathan Ogilvie | New Zealand |
| Poppy | | Linda Niccol | New Zealand |

== Marché du Film ==
=== Golden Horse Goes to Cannes ===
The section is a new program collaborated by the Golden Horse Awards and Marché du Film with the support of Taiwan's Ministry of Culture. Five upcoming Taiwanese projects that feature numerous Golden Horse Awards-winning cast members and filmmakers were selected to be screened during the film festival, including:

| English Title | Original Title | Director(s) | Production Country |
|---|---|---|---|
| The Chronicles Of Libidoists | 破浪男女 | Yang Ya-che | Taiwan |
| Dead Talents Society | 鬼才之道 | John Hsu | Taiwan |
| Kung Fu | 功夫 | Giddens Ko | Taiwan |
| A Foggy Tale | 大濛 | Chen Yu-hsun | Taiwan |
| Daughter's Daughter | 女兒的女兒 | Huang Xi | Taiwan |

=== Fantastic Pavilion Gala ===
The 2nd edition of the Fantastic Pavilion Gala selected the following seven titles:

| English Title | Original Title | Director(s) | Production Country |
|---|---|---|---|
| Aire, Just Breathe | Aire | Leticia Tonos | Spain, Dominican Republic |
| Black.White.Red. | | Andreas Marschall | Switzerland |
| Dirty Boy | | Doug Rao | United Kingdom |
| Do Not Enter | No Entres | Hugo Cardozo | Paraguay |
| Mourir or Not Mourir | | Anaïs Cave and Thomas Combret | France |
| Sayara | | Can Evrenol | Turkey |
| Vadakkan | | Sajeed A. Raman | India |

== Official awards ==
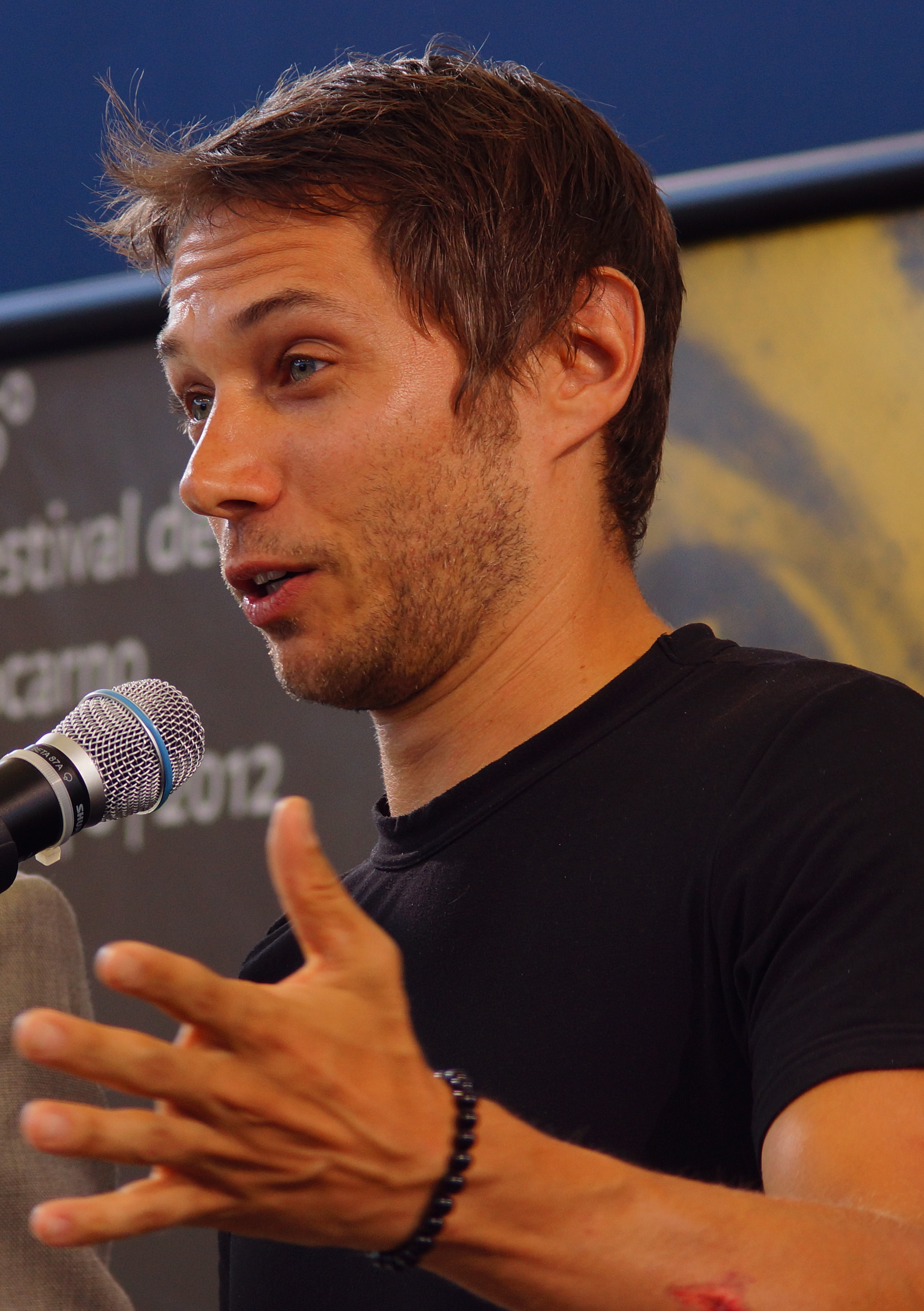
Sean Baker, Palme d'Or winner

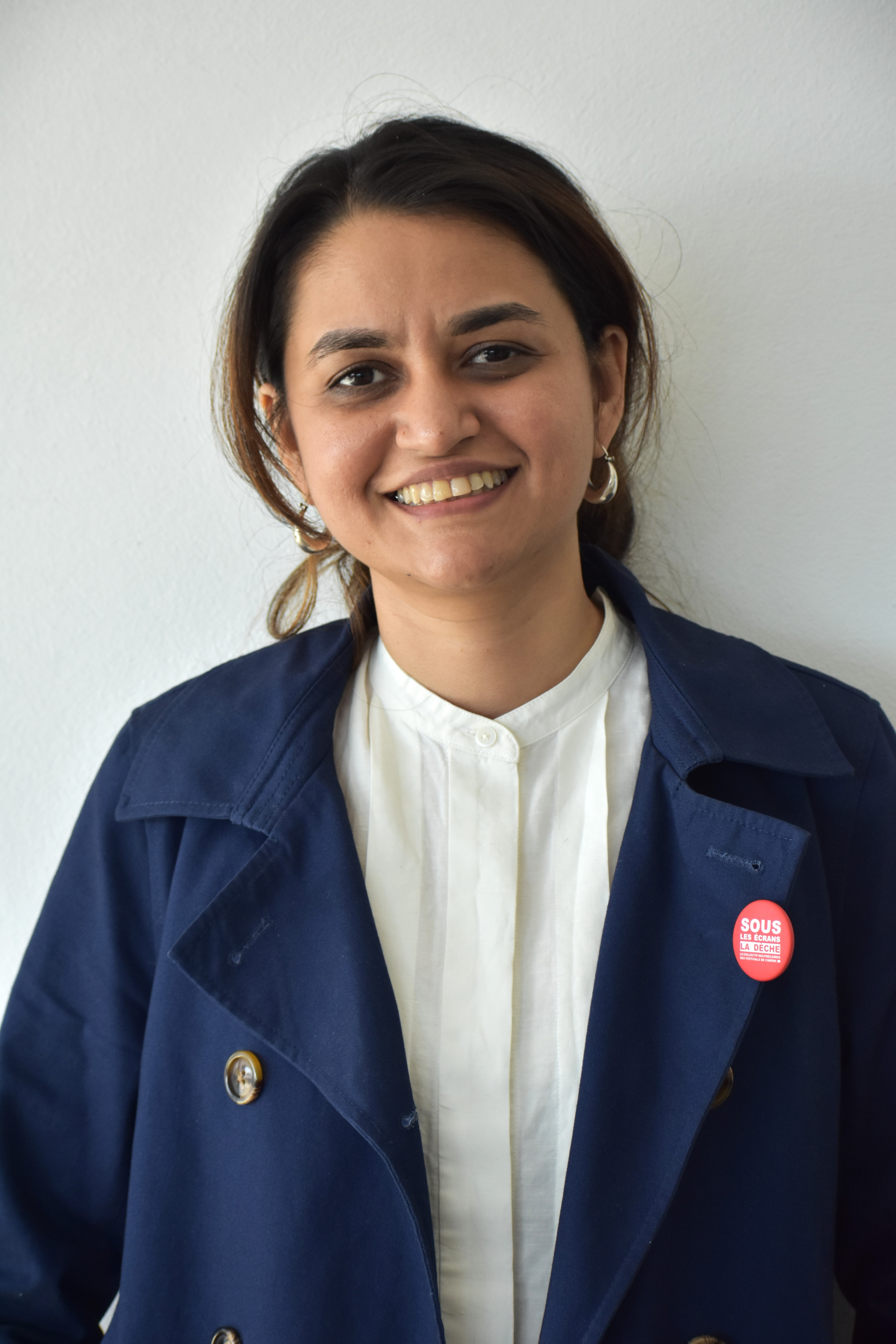
Payal Kapadia, Grand Prix winner

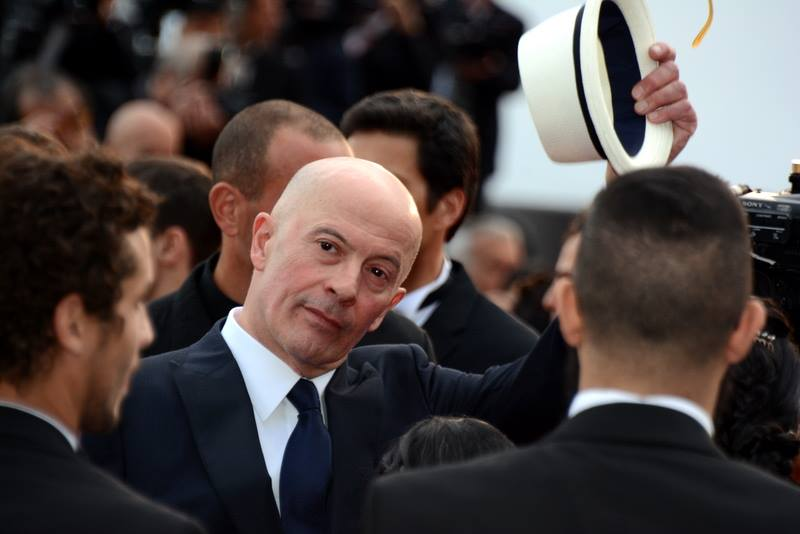
Jacques Audiard, Jury Prize winner

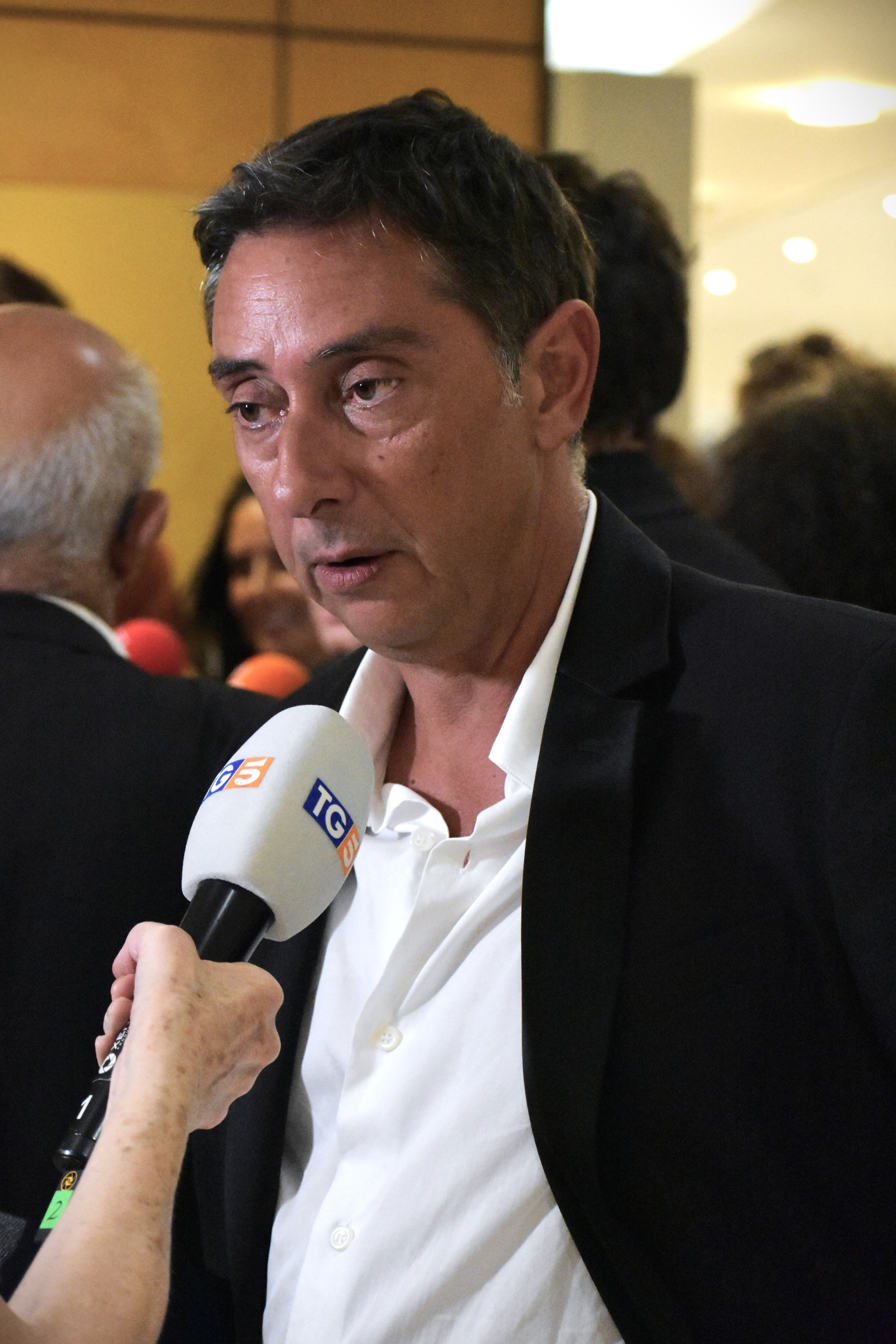
Miguel Gomes, Best Director winner

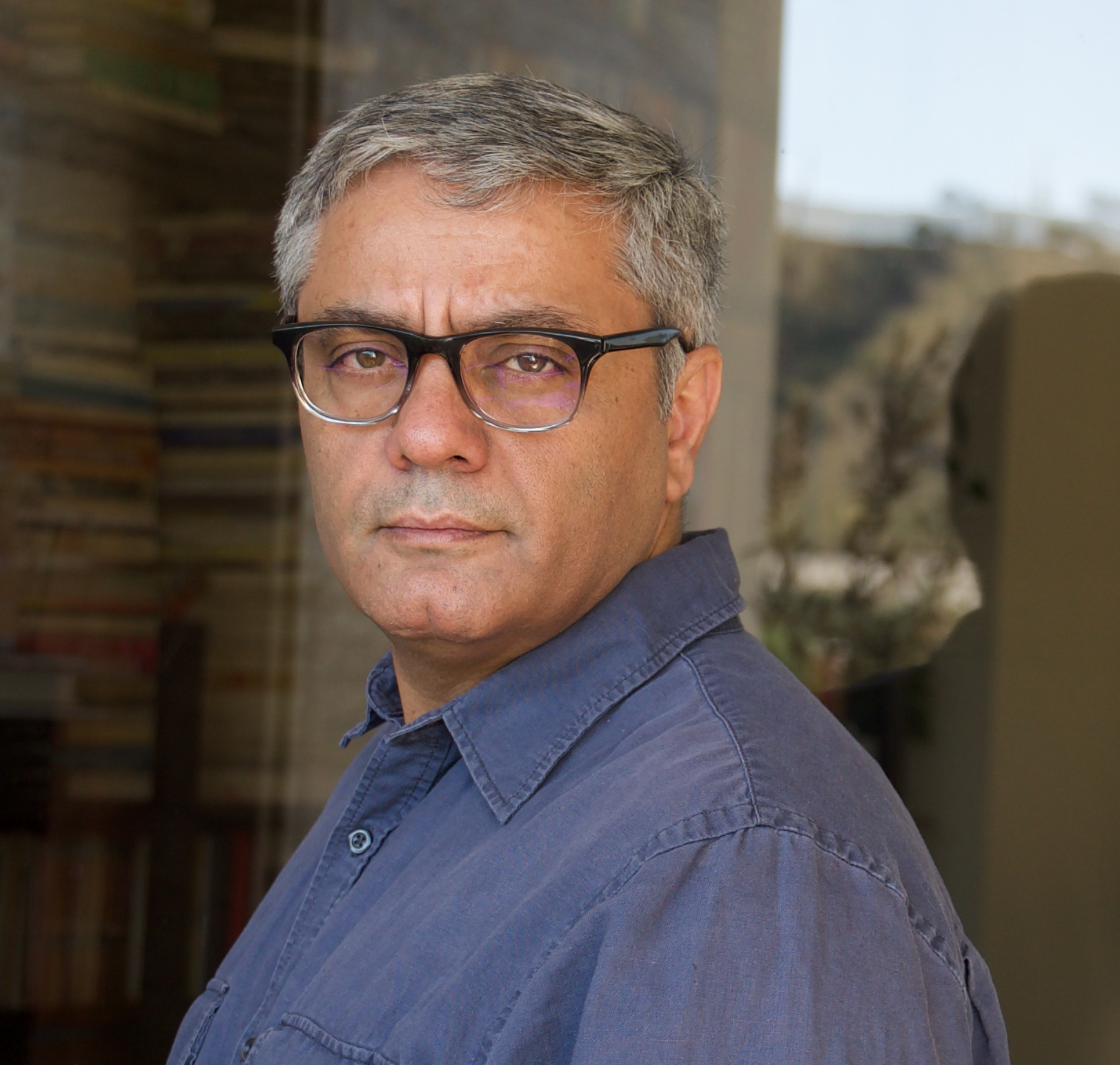
Mohammad Rasoulof, Special Award winner

=== In Competition ===
- Palme d'Or: Anora by Sean Baker
- Grand Prix: All We Imagine as Light by Payal Kapadia
- Jury Prize: Emilia Pérez by Jacques Audiard
- Best Director: Miguel Gomes for Grand Tour
- Best Actress: Adriana Paz, Karla Sofía Gascón, Selena Gomez, and Zoe Saldaña for Emilia Pérez
- Best Actor: Jesse Plemons for Kinds of Kindness
- Best Screenplay: The Substance by Coralie Fargeat
- Prix Spécial: (Note: The award was officially named Special Award or Prix Spécial by Cannes website. By the end of the year, during its theatrical release, the film shows its Cannes Official Selection card as a "Special Jury Prize" winner.) The Seed of the Sacred Fig by Mohammad Rasoulof

=== Un Certain Regard ===
- Un Certain Regard Prize: Black Dog by Guan Hu
- Un Certain Regard Jury Prize: Souleymane's Story by Boris Lojkine
- Un Certain Regard Best Director:
  - The Damned by Roberto Minervini
  - On Becoming a Guinea Fowl by Rungano Nyoni
- Un Certain Regard Performance Prize:
  - Anasuya Sengupta for The Shameless
  - Abou Sangaré for Souleymane's Story
- Un Certain Regard Youth Prize: Holy Cow by Louise Courvoisier
- Special Mention: Norah by Tawfik Alzaidi

=== Honorary Palme d'Or ===
- Meryl Streep
- Studio Ghibli
- George Lucas

=== Caméra d'Or ===
- Armand by Halfdan Ullmann Tøndel
  - Special Mention: Mongrel by Chiang Wei Liang and You Qiao Yin

=== Short Film Palme d'Or ===
- The Man Who Could Not Remain Silent by Nebojša Slijepčević
  - Special Mention: Bad for a Moment by Daniel Soares

=== Cinéfondation ===
- First Prize: Sunflowers Were the First Ones to Know... by Chidananda S Naik
- Second Prize:
  - Out of the Window Through the Wall by Asya Segalovich
  - The Chaos She Left Behind by Nikos Kolioukos
- Third Prize: Bunnyhood by Mansi Maheshwari

=== Immersive Competition ===
- Colored by Tania de Montaigne, Stéphane Foenkinos, Pierre-Alain Giraud

== Independent awards ==
=== FIPRESCI Prizes ===
- In Competition: The Seed of the Sacred Fig by Mohammad Rasoulof
- Un Certain Regard: Souleymane's Story by Boris Lojkine
- Parallel section (first features): Desert of Namibia by Yôko Yamanaka

=== Prize of the Ecumenical Jury ===
- The Seed of the Sacred Fig by Mohammad Rasoulof

=== Critics' Week ===
- Grand Prize: Simon of the Mountain by Federico Luis
- French Touch Prize of the Jury: Blue Sun Palace by Constance Tsang
- Leitz Cine Discovery Prize for Short Film: Montsouris Park by Guil Sela
- Louis Roederer Foundation Rising Star Award: Ricardo Teodoro for Baby
- Gan Foundation Award for Distribution: Julie Keeps Quiet by Leonardo Van Dijl
- Canal+ Award for Short Film: Absent by Cem Demirer
- SACD Award: Julie Keeps Quiet by Leonardo Van Dijl

=== Directors' Fortnight ===
- Audience Award: Universal Language by Matthew Rankin
- Europa Cinemas Label Award for Best European Film: The Other Way Around by Jonás Trueba
- SACD Prize for Best French Film: This Life of Mine by Sophie Fillières
- Golden Coach: Andrea Arnold

=== L'Œil d'or ===
- Ernest Cole: Lost and Found by Raoul Peck
- The Brink of Dreams by Nada Riyadh and Ayman El Amir

=== Queer Palm ===
- Three Kilometres to the End of the World by Emanuel Pârvu
- Best Short Film: Southern Brides by Elena López Riera

=== Prix François Chalais ===
- The Seed of the Sacred Fig by Mohammad Rasoulof

=== Prix de la Citoyenneté ===
- Citizenship Prize: Bird by Andrea Arnold

=== Prix des Cinémas Art et Essai ===
- AFCAE Art House Cinema Award: The Seed of the Sacred Fig by Mohammad Rasoulof
  - Special Mention: All We Imagine as Light by Payal Kapadia

=== Palm Dog ===
- Kodi for Dog on Trial
- Grand Jury Prize: Xin for Black Dog
- Mutt Moment:
  - Bird
  - Kinds of Kindness
  - Megalopolis

=== Trophée Chopard ===
- Mike Faist
- Sophie Wilde
