= Tawfik Alzaidi =

Saudi screenwriter and film director

- Born: 1983 (age 42–43); Medina, Saudi Arabia

Comedy career
- Genres: Film director; screenwriter

Tawfik Alzaidi (Arabic: توفيق الزايدي, born 1982 in Medina, Saudi Arabia) is a Film Director, Producer and screenwriter . His first feature film, Norah, was selected for the Un Certain Regard competition at the Cannes Film Festival. His movies have won several accolades, including his first short film, Perfect Crime, which won the best editing award at the 2007 Jeddah Film Festival, and his film Norah, which won the Best Saudi Feature Film award at the 2023 Red Sea International Film Festival, and received a Special Mention at the Cannes Film Festival.

== Career ==
He started making his own films in 2006. He participated in various global and Arab festivals under the name of Saudi Arabia. His films have received several local and Arab awards.

In 2009, he wrote and directed the movie The Silence, which won the Gulf Short Film Award at the Muscat International Film Festival. It premiered in over twenty countries worldwide and was chosen by a US organization to screen as part of their private library.

In 2010, he wrote and directed the movie Exit, which won two awards at the Saudi Film Festival and the Golden Creativity Award at the 2011 Lebanon Festival.

In 2015, he wrote and directed the film The Other, which embodies an initiative by the Prince Mohammed bin Salman Foundation (Misk) to nurture and empower talents. It won the Best Short Film Award at the 2016 Riyadh Film Festival. The same year, he wrote and directed the film Four Colors.

In 2023, his film Norah received the Best Saudi Feature Film Award at the 3rd edition of the Red Sea International Film Festival.

In May 2024, the film Norah was selected for screening at the Cannes Film Festival as part of the Un Certain Regard section. The film was funded by the Daw Film Competition, an initiative launched by the Saudi Film Commission under the Saudi Ministry of Culture and supported by the Red Sea International Film Festival and Film AlUla.

== Filmography ==
- 2006 – Together for Peace (Documentary film)
- 2007 – Perfect Crime (Documentary film), Winner of Best Editing Award at Jeddah Film Festival
- 2009 – Silence (Short Feature Film), Winner of Gulf Short Film Award at Muscat Film Festival
- 2010 – Exit (Short Feature Film), Winner of the Saudi Films Festival award and Golden Creativity Award at the 2011 Lebanon Festival.
- 2015 – The Other, Winner of the Best Short Film Award at the 2016 Riyadh Film Festival.
- 2015 – Four Colors (Short Film)
- 2023 – Norah, Winner of Best Saudi Feature Film at the 2023 Red Sea International Film Festival (3rd edition) and selected for screening at the Cannes Film Festival as part of the Un Certain Regard section in May 2024.
