= Do Not Enter =

Do Not Enter may refer to:

- Do Not Enter (2024 film), a supernatural horror thriller film
- Do Not Enter (2026 film), an American horror thriller film
