= Abou Sangaré =

Guinean actor and mechanic

- Born: Guinea
- Occupation: Actor
- Years active: 2024–present
- Notable work: Souleymane's Story as Souleymane

Abou Sangaré is a Guinean auto mechanic and actor who lives in France. He is primarily known for his role as Souleymane in Souleymane's Story. For this role, he has received several accolades, including a European Film Award, a Gotham Award, and a César Award.

== Early and personal life ==
Abou Sangaré was born in Guinea. He left Guinea as a teenager, seeking to make enough money to pay for medical care for his mother, who has epilepsy. He enrolled in a vocational school program in road transport vehicle maintenance, and obtained his technician's certificate in Amiens.

At the beginning of 2025 he received a one-year residence permit, after failing on three previous attempts and being targeted by an OQTF.

== Career ==
In 2023, he was cast by Boris Lojkine to star in Souleymane's Story for his first ever acting role. The movie about a Guinea immigrant food delivery driver in Paris premiered at the Un Certain Regard section at the 2024 Cannes Film Festival. He went on to win the Best Performance award.

He was awarded the Best Male Revelation at the 2025 César Awards and Best Actor at the 2025 Lumière Awards.

Additionally, he won the European Film Award for Best Actor at the 37th European Film Awards and the Breakthrough Performer at the Gotham Independent Film Awards 2025 for his role in Souleymane’s Story.

== Filmography ==
=== Film ===
Year	Title	Role	Notes	Ref.
2024	Souleymane's Story	Souleymane	Lead role	
