= Souleymane's Story =

2024 film

- Theatrical release poster
- French: L'Histoire de Souleymane
- Directed by: Boris Lojkine
- Written by: Boris Lojkine; Delphine Agut
- Produced by: Bruno Nahon
- Starring: Abou Sangaré
- Cinematography: Tristan Galand
- Edited by: Xavier Sirven
- Production company: Unité
- Distributed by: Pyramide Distribution
- Release dates: 19 May 2024 (Cannes); 9 October 2024 (France)
- Running time: 94 minutes
- Country: France
- Languages: French; Fula; Maninka
- Box office: $4.5 million

Souleymane's Story (French: L'Histoire de Souleymane), previously titled The Story of Souleymane, is a 2024 French film directed by Boris Lojkine from a script he wrote with Delphine Agut. The film stars Abou Sangaré as Souleymane, an immigrant from Guinea working for a food delivery service in Paris.

The film had its world premiere at the Un Certain Regard section of the 2024 Cannes Film Festival, where it won the Jury Prize and the Performance Prize. It received eight nominations at the 50th César Awards, including Best Film, and won four awards: Best Supporting Actress (for Nina Meurisse), Best Male Revelation (for Sangaré), Best Original Screenplay and Best Editing.

== Premise ==
Souleymane's Story follows Souleymane, a recent Guinean immigrant, through the streets of Paris as he prepares for his asylum application interview while working for a meal delivery service on his e-bike.

The themes revolve around the exploitation of the sans papiers (without papers), often by fellow Africans - one a fellow immigrant from northern Guinea who lazily coaches asylum applicants to recite false stories of political persecution at their hearings in return for payment, and another who lends Souleymane a food delivery account but then takes half of his earnings every week. The film largely avoids depictions of racism but equally, there are few acts of kindness in the film.

== Cast ==
- Abou Sangaré as Souleymane
- Nina Meurisse as the OFPRA agent
- Alpha Oumar Sow as Barry
- Emmanuel Yovanie as Emmanuel
- Younoussa Diallo as Khalil
- Ghislain Mahan as Ghislain
- Mamadou Barry as Mamadou
- Yaya Diallo as Yaya
- Keita Diallo as Kadiatou

== Production ==
While developing the film, Lojkine and casting director Aline Dalbis consulted with food delivery workers in Paris to learn about the challenges they faced and got to know members of the city's Guinean immigrant community. The film's star, Abou Sangaré, was identified during an open casting call conducted as part of this research. He had no acting experience. Sangaré had immigrated to France seven years prior to casting, while he was still a teenager, and his personal story was incorporated into the film's narrative. He works as a heavy truck mechanic in Amiens and it was this acting role that helped Sangaré secure permanent residency in France.

Scenes in which Souleymane delivered food on his bicycle were filmed by a cameraman riding a bicycle alongside the actor.

To write the final asylum interview scene, the filmmakers gathered input from Guinean asylum seekers and sat in on interviews conducted by OFPRA (the French Office for the Protection of Refugees and Stateless Persons).

== Release ==
Souleymane's Story had its world premiere at the Un Certain Regard section of the 2024 Cannes Film Festival, where it won the Jury Prize and the Performance Prize, and the FIPRESCI Prize for the Un Certain Regard section.

Pyramide Distribution released the film in French cinemas on 9 October 2024.

== Reception ==
=== Critical response ===
On the review aggregator website Rotten Tomatoes, 100% of 63 critics' reviews are positive, with an average rating of 8.0/10. The website's consensus reads: "Achingly human in its depiction of immigrant struggles, Souleymane's Story asks us to witness, understand, and grant empathy to all." Metacritic, which uses a weighted average, assigned the film a score of 83 out of 100, based on 16 critics, indicating "universal acclaim".

=== Accolades ===
Award	Ceremony date	Category	Recipient(s)	Result	Ref.
Abitibi-Témiscamingue International Film Festival	2024	Médiafilm Robert-Claude Bérubé Prize	Souleymane's Story	Won	
Cannes Film Festival	25 May 2024 (Note: The award ceremony of Un Certain Regard was held on 24 May 2024.)	Prix Un Certain Regard	Souleymane's Story	Nominated	
Cannes Film Festival	25 May 2024	Un Certain Regard – Jury Prize	Souleymane's Story	Won	
Cannes Film Festival	25 May 2024	Un Certain Regard – Best Performance (Note: Shared with Anasuya Sengupta for The Shameless.)	Abou Sangaré	Won	
Cannes Film Festival	25 May 2024	FIPRESCI Prize	Souleymane's Story	Won	
César Awards	28 February 2025	Best Film	Souleymane's Story	Nominated	
César Awards	28 February 2025	Best Director	Boris Lojkine	Nominated	
César Awards	28 February 2025	Best Supporting Actress	Nina Meurisse	Won	
César Awards	28 February 2025	Best Male Revelation	Abou Sangaré	Won	
César Awards	28 February 2025	Best Original Screenplay	Boris Lojkine and Delphine Agut	Won	
César Awards	28 February 2025	Best Cinematography	Tristan Galand	Nominated	
César Awards	28 February 2025	Best Editing	Xavier Sirven	Won	
César Awards	28 February 2025	Best Sound	Marc-Olivier Brullé, Pierre Bariaud, Charlotte Butrak and Samuel Aïchoun	Nominated	
European Film Awards	7 December 2024	European Actor	Abou Sangaré	Won	
European Film Awards	7 December 2024	European Sound	Marc-Olivier Brullé, Pierre Bariaud, Charlotte Butrak, Samuel Aïchoun, Rodrigo Diaz	Won	
Gotham Awards	1 December 2025	Breakthrough Performer	Abou Sangaré	Won	
Louis Delluc Prize	4 December 2024	Best Film	Souleymane's Story	Nominated	
Lumière Awards	20 January 2025	Best Film	Souleymane's Story	Nominated	
Lumière Awards	20 January 2025	Best Director	Boris Lojkine	Nominated	
Lumière Awards	20 January 2025	Best Screenplay	Boris Lojkine and Delphine Agut	Nominated	
Lumière Awards	20 January 2025	Best Actor	Abou Sangaré	Won	
Lumière Awards	20 January 2025	Best Cinematography	Tristan Galand	Nominated	
