= Unidentified =

Unidentified may refer to:

- Unidentified (2006 film), an American film
- Unidentified (2020 film), a Romanian film
- Unidentified (2025 film), a Saudi thriller film
- Unidentified: Inside America's UFO Investigation, a 2019–2020 American docudrama television series
