= Locust (2024 film) =

2024 Taiwanese neo-noir thriller drama film directed by KEFF

Locust (Chinese: 蟲; pinyin: chóng; trans. "bug, insignificant person") is a 2024 Taiwanese neo-noir thriller drama film directed by Taiwanese-American filmmaker KEFF on his feature film directorial debut. The film is a co-production by Taiwan, USA, Qatar and France. The film also captures incidents pertaining to the 2019 Hong Kong mass protests.

== Synopsis ==
Chung-Han, a mute restaurant worker who himself goes through an existential crisis by his own standards, has to follow the famous idiom of "live to fight another day" to sum up his experiences of survival amidst being caught in a critical juncture of having to fight against a deadly violent gang.

== Cast ==
- Liu Wei-chen (Chinese: 劉韋辰) as Chung-Han (鍾翰)
- Rimong Ihwar
- Devin Pan
- An-shung Yu
- Yi Jung Wu
- Nien-Hsien Ma

== Production ==
Filmmaker KEFF (王凱民) spent most of his life in the United States of America before moving back to his home, Taiwan, in 2019. He started work on the film soon after his return, citing a lack of attention among the younger generation in Taiwan about the Chinese government's rapid escalation and crackdown on civil liberties in Hong Kong, which has sparked concern from some quarters that it is a prelude to a Chinese invasion of Taiwan. KEFF focused on portraying the low interest among the young Taiwanese population for international affairs. He expressed his desire to tell more human stories deviating from common portrayals from Taiwan as merely "a headline in the news" about semiconductors or international conflict.

The film gained substantial production support from Aide aux Cinemas du Monde in France and the Qatari non-profit organization Doha Film Institute announced a post-production grant for the filmmakers. As part of lead actor Liu Wei-chen's preparation for the role, he was not allowed to speak at all for weeks before the commencement of principal photography.

== Marketing ==
MK2 Films pioneered the international sales for the film project and MK2 Films collaborated through its production banner MK Productions for the film project.

== Premiere ==
On 16 May 2024, the film was premiered at the Cannes Critics' Week (Semaine de la critique) during the 2024 Cannes Film Festival.

The film had its premiere in the Critics' Week program at the 22nd Morelia International Film Festival.

== Accolades ==
The film received invitation to enter the Berlinale Talents’ Script Station for 2022.
