= Konstantin Bojanov =

Bulgarian artist and filmmaker (born 1968)

- Born: 1968 (age 56–57)
- Occupations: Visual artist; filmmaker

Konstantin Bojanov (born 1968) is a Bulgarian artist and filmmaker.

== Education ==
Bojanov graduated from the National School of Fine Arts in Sofia in 1987, after which he earned a master's degree from the Royal College of Art in London. He later studied documentary filmmaking at New York University.

== Career ==
After working as a visual artist throughout the 1990s in London, Bojanov directed his first short film, Lemon is Lemon in 2001. This was followed by the 2005 feature documentary Invisible, which detailed the impact of heroin on six individuals from his hometown of Sofia.

Bojanov's first narrative feature, Avé, screened in the Critics' Week section of the 2011 Cannes Film Festival. His second feature, Light Thereafter premiered at the 2017 International Film Festival Rotterdam.

The Shameless, Bojanov's third narrative feature, was selected to debut in the Un Certain Regard section of the 2024 Cannes Film Festival.

== Filmography ==
Year	Title	Notes	Ref.
2001	Lemon Is Lemon	Short film	
2005	Invisible	Documentary	
2011	Avé	—	
2017	Light Thereafter	—	
2024	The Shameless	—	

== Awards and nominations ==
Year	Award	Category	Nominated work	Result	Ref.
2011	Cannes Film Festival	Camera d'Or	Avé	Nominated	
2011	Cannes Film Festival	Critics' Week Grand Prize	Avé	Nominated	
2011	Hamburg Film Festival	Young Talent Award	Avé	Won	
2011	Sarajevo Film Festival	Special Jury Prize for Feature Film	Avé	Won	
2011	Warsaw International Film Festival	FIPRESCI Prize	Avé	Won	
2017	International Film Festival Rotterdam	Hivos Tiger Competition	Light Thereafter	Nominated	
2024	Cannes Film Festival	Un Certain Regard	The Shameless	Nominated	
