= Mo Harawe =

Somali-Austrian filmmaker

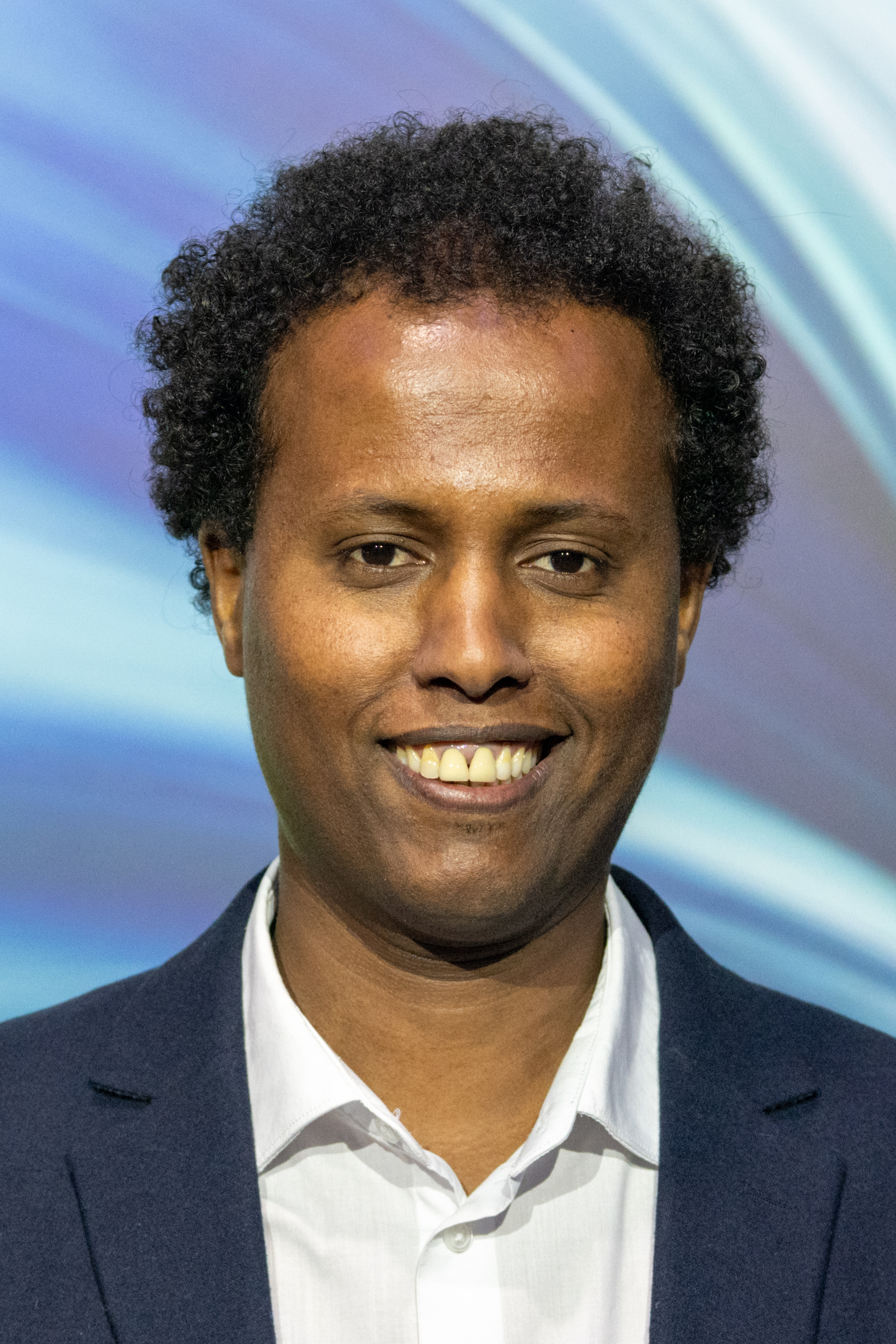
- Mo Harawe in 2025
- Born: 1992 (age 33–34); Mogadishu, Somalia

Mo Harawe (born 1992) is a Somali-Austrian filmmaker. His debut feature film, The Village Next to Paradise, was selected for the Un Certain Regard section of the 2024 Cannes Film Festival.

== Early life and education ==
Harawe was born in Mogadishu and attended art school in Somalia. He later studied visual communication and film at Kunsthochschule Kassel (KhK, Kassel, Germany).

== Career ==
In 2009, Harawe moved to Austria and began a career in the film industry. He released a string of short films throughout the 2010s and early 2020s. His 2024 debut feature-length project, The Village Next to Paradise, was selected to screen at that year's Cannes Film Festival.

== Filmography ==
Year	Title	Notes	Ref.
2012	Wait a minute	Short film	
2014	The other side	Short film	
2015	Identity	Short film	
2016	One last moment	Short film	
2018	The story of the polar bear that went to Africa	Short film	
2019	1947	Short film	
2020	Life on the Horn	Short film	
2022	Will My Parents Come to See Me	Short film	
2024	The Village Next to Paradise	—N/a	

== Awards and nominations ==
Year	Award	Category	Nominated work	Result	Ref.
2020	Locarno International Film Festival	International Competition	Life on the Horn	Special mention	
2020	Uppsala International Film Festival	Grand Prix	Life on the Horn	Nominated	
2020	Uppsala International Film Festival	Uppsala Award in Memory of Ingmar Bergman	Life on the Horn	Won	
2021	Carthage Film Festival	Best Narrative Short Film	Life on the Horn	Won	
2021	Dokufest	Best International Short	Life on the Horn	Nominated	
2021	Glasgow Short Film Festival	Best Short	Life on the Horn	Nominated	
2021	VIS Vienna Independent Shorts	Youth Jury Award for Best FIctional ÖW Film	Life on the Horn	Won	
2021	Norwegian Short Film Festival	Best International Short Film	Life on the Horn	Nominated	
2022	Berlin International Film Festival	Golden Bear for Best Short Film	Will My Parents Come to See Me	Nominated	
2022	Dokufest	Best International Short	Will My Parents Come to See Me	Won	
2022	European Film Awards	Best European Short Film	Will My Parents Come to See Me	Nominated	
2022	Festival Cinema Africano, Asia e America Latina	Best African Short Film	Will My Parents Come to See Me	Won	
2022	German Short Film Award	Outstanding Short Film - Under 30 Minutes Length	Will My Parents Come to See Me	Won	
2022	VIS Vienna Independent Shorts	Best Austrian Short Film	Will My Parents Come to See Me		
2023	Austrian Film Award	Best Short Film	Will My Parents Come to See Me	Won	
2023	Clermont-Ferrand International Short Film Festival	International Jury Grand Prize	Will My Parents Come to See Me	Won	
2023	London Short Film Festival	Best International Short Film	Will My Parents Come to See Me	Won	
2024	Cannes Film Festival	Un Certain Regard	The Village Next to Paradise	Pending	
2024	Cannes Film Festival	Caméra d'Or	The Village Next to Paradise	Pending	
