= Meda or the Not So Bright Side of Things =

2017 Romanian drama film directed by Emanuel Pârvu

- Theatrical release poster
- Romanian: Meda sau Partea nu prea fericită a lucrurilor
- Directed by: Emanuel Pârvu
- Screenplay by: Emanuel Pârvu
- Produced by: Miruna Berescu; Dan Chișu; Dorin Mirea; Domnica Predoiu; Tudor Reu
- Starring: Șerban Pavlu; Ana Radu
- Cinematography: Silviu Stavilã
- Edited by: Dan-Ștefan Pârlog
- Production companies: DaKINO Production; FamArt Production
- Release dates: 15 August 2017 (Sarajevo Film Festival); 24 November 2017 (Romania)
- Running time: 82 minutes
- Country: Romania
- Language: Romanian
- Budget: €1,060,800

Meda or the Not So Bright Side of Things (Romanian: Meda sau Partea nu prea fericită a lucrurilor) is a 2017 Romanian drama film directed and written by Emanuel Pârvu, and starring Șerban Pavlu and Ana Radu. The plot follows Doru (Pavlu), a widowed lumberjack living in an isolated village, who struggles to earn money so that his foster teenage daughter Meda (Radu) is not sent back to the orphanage. It is the full-length debut of Pârvu.

The film premiered on August 15, 2017, at the Sarajevo Film Festival where Pârvu and Pavlu received the Heart of Sarajevo Award for Best Director and Heart of Sarajevo Award for Best Actor, respectively. The film was theatrically released in Romania on November 24, 2017. At the 2018 Gopo Awards, Meda received nominations for Best Film, Best Actor (for Pavlu), Best Cinematography (for Silviu Stavilă) and Best Directorial Debut (for Pârvu), but won neither of them.

== Cast ==
- Șerban Pavlu as Doru
- Adrian Titieni as Dascalul
- Florin Zamfirescu as Pandele
- Ana Radu as Meda
- Costel Cașcaval as Petrică
- Dan Astilean as Șeful de post
- Vlad Corbeanu as Mocanu
- Radu Zetu as Gelu
- Lucian Ghimisi as Mișa
- Lucian Ifrim as Ecologistul
- Mihai Dinvale as Socrul
- Rodica Negrea as Soacra
- Ion Sapdaru as Directorul de orfelinat
- Ioana Abur as Doctorița
- Codin Maticiuc as Scurtu Mihail
- Vlad Jipa as Primarul
- Alex Conovaru as Delegat 2
- Gabriel Radu as Delegat 1
