= Hala Elkoussy =

Egyptian artist and film director (b. 1974)

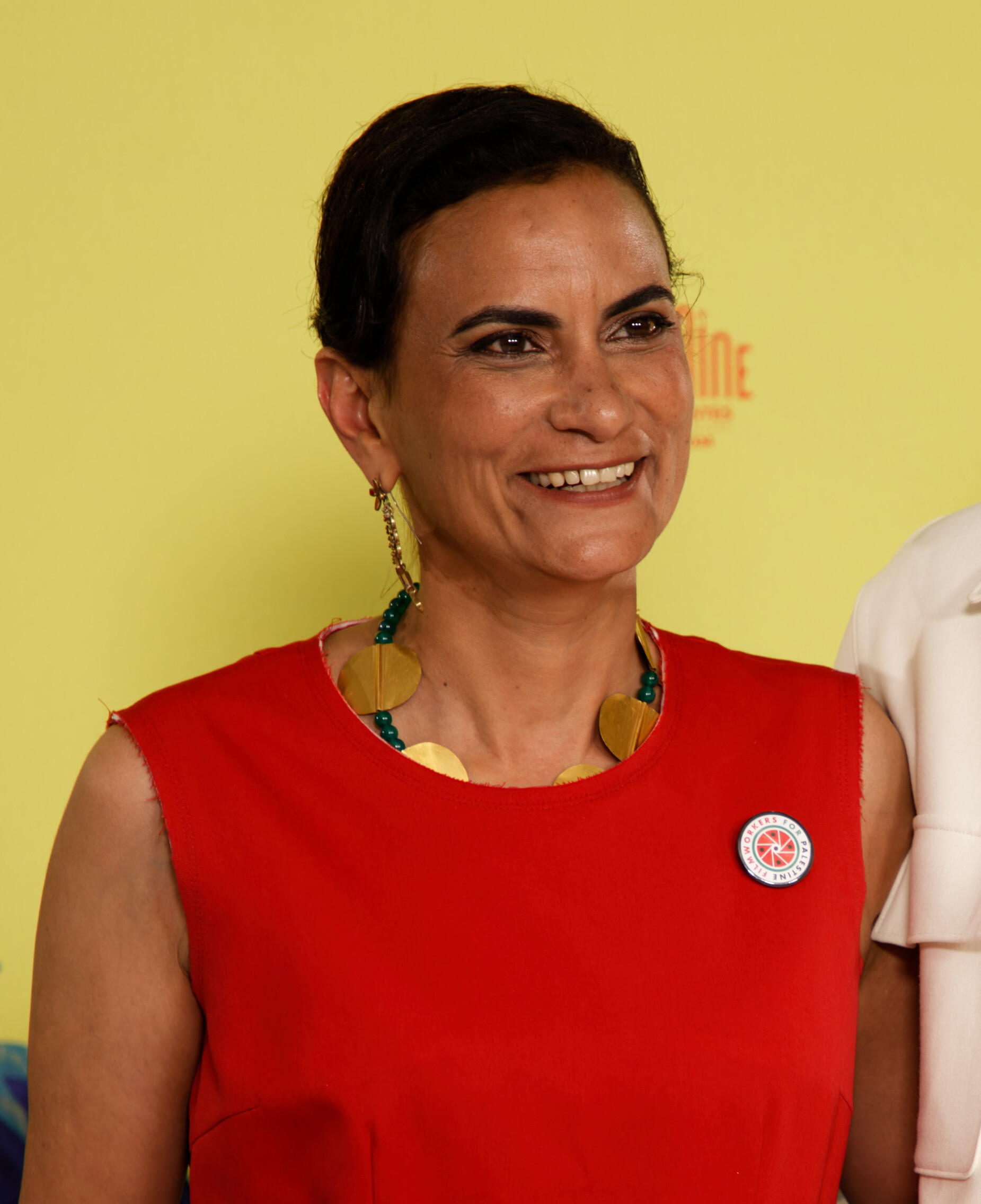
- Elkoussy in 2024
- Born: 1974 (age 51–52); Cairo
- Citizenship: Egypt, The Netherlands
- Occupations: Artist and film director

Hala Elkoussy (born 1974) is an Egyptian artist and film director.

Elkoussy was born in Cairo in 1974. She received the Abraaj Capital Art Prize in Dubai in 2010. Her first film, Cactus Flower, was released in 2017. Her work is held in the collection of the Tate Museum, London, and Art Jameel, Saudi Arabia. Her 2024 film, East of Noon was screened at the 2024 Cannes Film Festival's Directors' Fortnight.
