= Three Kilometres to the End of the World =

- Theatrical release poster
- Romanian: Trei kilometri până la capătul lumii
- Directed by: Emanuel Pârvu
- Written by: Miruna Berescu; Emanuel Pârvu
- Produced by: Miruna Berescu
- Starring: Ciprian Chiujdea; Bogdan Dumitrache; Laura Vasiliu; Valeriu Andriuță; Ingrid Micu-Berescu
- Cinematography: Silviu Stavilă
- Edited by: Mircea Olteanu
- Production companies: FamArt Production; Romanian Film Centre; Publicis Groupe Media Bucharest; MMS Communications; House of Media
- Distributed by: Independența Film
- Release dates: 17 May 2024 (Cannes); 11 October 2024 (Romania)
- Running time: 105 minutes
- Country: Romania
- Language: Romanian
- Budget: €1 million

Three Kilometres to the End of the World (Romanian: Trei kilometri până la capătul lumii) is a 2024 Romanian New Wave drama film directed by Emanuel Pârvu, from a screenplay he co-wrote with Miruna Berescu. Starring Ciprian Chiujdea, Bogdan Dumitrache and Laura Vasiliu, it follows the aftermath of a hate crime against a young gay man in a small Romanian village.

The film had its world premiere at the main competition of the 77th Cannes Film Festival on 17 May 2024, where it was nominated for the Palme d'Or and won the Queer Palm. The film was chosen as the Romanian entry for Best International Feature Film at the 97th Academy Awards, but it was not nominated.

== Plot ==
Adi, aged 17, is spending the summer in his home village in the Danube Delta. One night he is brutally gaybashed on the street, the next day his world is turned upside-down. His parents no longer look at him as they did, and the seeming tranquillity of the village starts to crack.

== Cast ==
- Ciprian Chiujdea as Adi
- Bogdan Dumitrache as The Father
- Laura Vasiliu as The Mother
- Valeriu Andriuță as The Police Chief
- Ingrid Micu-Berescu as Ilinca
- Richard Bovnoczki
- Adrian Titieni as The Priest
- Alina Berzunţeanu
- Radu Gabriel
- Crina Semciuc

== Production ==
The film was shot in the Danube Delta, more precisely in the Sfântu Gheorghe branch and the Dunavăț canal, during September and October 2023.

Ciprian Chiujdea had originally been cast in a small supporting role, but was invited to reaudition for the lead following Pârvu's insistence that Adi needed to be played by an actor who was actually gay in real life. As Pârvu himself is not a member of the LGBTQ community, he further worked with Chiujdea to ensure that the events and dialogue in the screenplay were realistic.

== Release ==
The film was selected for the Main Competition for the Palme d'Or at the 2024 Cannes Film Festival, where it had its world premiere on 17 May 2024. In April 2024, Goodfellas acquired world sales rights to the film. Independența Film began distributing the film in Romania on 11 October 2024.

== Reception ==
=== Critical response ===
On the review aggregator website Rotten Tomatoes, 67% of 15 critics' reviews are positive, with an average rating of 6.6/10. On Metacritic, the film has a weighted average score of 61 out of 100, based on 7 critic reviews indicating "generally favorable" reviews.

Wendy Ide of Screen Daily wrote that Parvu "is confident enough as a storyteller not to feel the need to show everything. Not only do we not see the assault itself, only its aftermath when Adi stumbles home, but Parvu also lets Adi drift out of the frame during the charged nighttime conversation with the tourist. It’s a smart device – the film is Adi’s story, of course. But it’s also that of his parents (played by Bogdan Dumitrache and Laura Vasiliu), who struggle to see their actual son behind the distorting lens of who and what they believe he should be."

=== Accolades ===
Award	Date of ceremony	Category	Recipient(s)	Result	Ref.
Cannes Film Festival	25 May 2024	Palme d'Or	Emanuel Pârvu	Nominated	
Cannes Film Festival	25 May 2024	Queer Palm	Emanuel Pârvu	Won	
European Film Awards	7 December 2024	European University Film Award	Emanuel Pârvu	Won	
Sarajevo Film Festival	August 2024	Heart of Sarajevo for Best Feature Film	Three Kilometres to the End of the World	Won	

== See also ==
- List of submissions to the 97th Academy Awards for Best International Feature Film
- List of Romanian submissions for the Academy Award for Best International Feature Film
