= Julien Colonna =

French film director

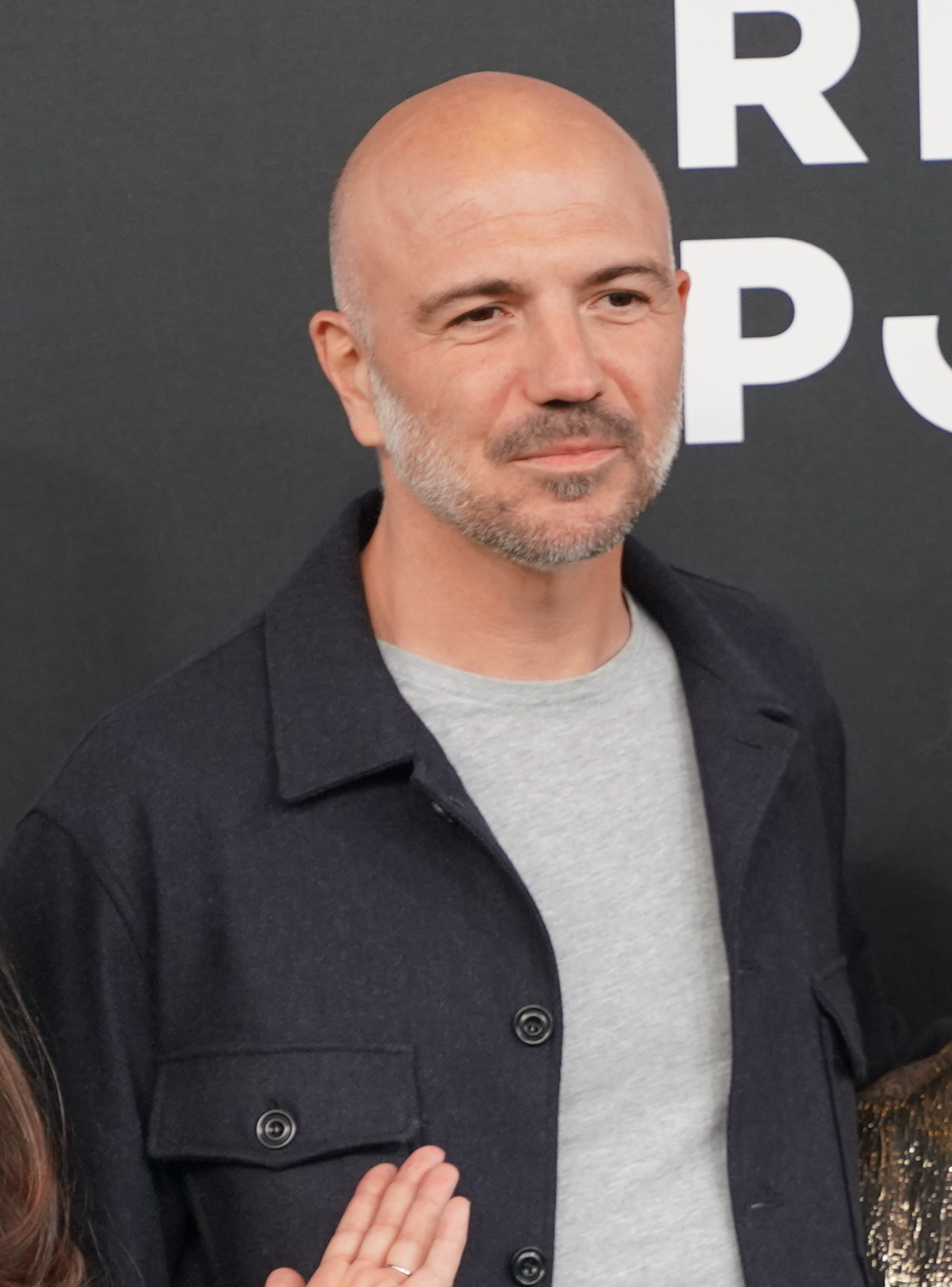
- Born: January 6, 1982 (age 43); Corsica
- Occupation(s): Film director, screenwriter

Julien Colonna (born January 6, 1982) is a Corsican filmmaker.

== Career ==
After directing the 2015 short film Confession and a string of commercials throughout the 2010s, Colonna's first feature film, The Kingdom, debuted in the Un Certain Regard portion of the 2024 Cannes Film Festival, where it was eligible for the Camera d'Or.

== Personal life ==
Colonna is married. His debut feature, The Kingdom, was inspired by the birth of his daughter a few years prior.

== Filmography ==
=== Film ===
Year	Title	Notes	Ref.
2015	Confession	Short film	
2024	The Kingdom	—	

=== Commercials ===
Year	Brand	Title	Ref.
2015	Verbreuil	"Last Dance"	
2016	Hennessy	"Craft Master Blenders feat. C.J. Hendry"	
2017	Mastercard	"Next Chapter feat. Hugh Jackman"	

== Awards and nominations ==
Year	Award	Category	Nominated work	Result	Ref.
2024	Cannes Film Festival	Un Certain Regard	The Kingdom	Nominated	
2024	Cannes Film Festival	Camera d'Or	The Kingdom	Nominated	
