= Hope (2014 film) =

- Film poster
- Directed by: Boris Lojkine
- Written by: Boris Lojkine
- Produced by: Bruno Nahon
- Starring: Endurance Newton; Justin Wang
- Cinematography: Elin Kirschfink
- Edited by: Gilles Volta
- Music by: David Bryant
- Distributed by: Pyramide Distribution
- Release dates: 20 May 2014 (Cannes); 28 January 2015 (France)
- Running time: 91 minutes
- Country: France
- Languages: French; English

Hope is a 2014 French drama film directed by Boris Lojkine. It was screened as part of the Critics' Week section at the 2014 Cannes Film Festival where it won the SACD Award.

== Cast ==
- Endurance Newton as Hope
- Justin Wang as Léonard
