= Lula (film) =

2024 documentary film

- Directed by: Oliver Stone; Robert S. Wilson
- Written by: Kurt Mattila; Alexis Chavez
- Produced by: Max Arvelaiz; Fernando Sulichin; Rob Wilson
- Cinematography: Lucas Fuica; João Atala
- Music by: Yuval Lavi Brad Ritchie Ivo Senra
- Release date: 19 May 2024 (Cannes)
- Running time: 90 minutes
- Countries: Brazil; United States

Lula is a 2024 documentary film about Luiz Inácio Lula da Silva directed by Oliver Stone and Robert S. Wilson.

== Cast ==
- Luiz Inácio Lula da Silva
- Glenn Greenwald
- Oliver Stone

== Release ==
Lula premiered at the 2024 Cannes Film Festival.
