= Sunflowers Were the First Ones to Know... =

Indian film

- Official poster
- Directed by: Chidananda S Naik
- Written by: Chidananda S Naik
- Starring: Jahangeer M S; Vishwas B S; Vasudha Bharighat
- Cinematography: Suraj Thakur
- Edited by: Manoj Venkatesh
- Music by: Abhishek Kadam
- Production company: Film and Television Institute of India (FTII)
- Release date: 2023
- Running time: 16 minutes
- Country: India

Sunflowers Were the First Ones to Know... is a 2023 Indian Kannada language short film directed by Chidananda S Naik. It was produced as part of his year-end exercise at the Film and Television Institute of India (FTII), the 16-minute film won the La Cinef award for Best Short at the 2024 Cannes Film Festival.

== Synopsis ==
The film is about an elderly woman who steals a prized rooster from her village, causing a disturbance that plunges the community into darkness. The villagers then go on a mission to find the rooster and bring back the light. The entire film is shot at night, creating a mysterious and intriguing atmosphere.

== Cast ==
- Jahangeer M S
- Vishwas B S
- Vasudha Bharighat

== Production ==
The film features Suraj Thakur as the cinematographer, Manoj V as the editor and Abhishek Kadam handling sound design. The production faced significant challenges, including a tight shooting schedule of four days and the difficulties of filming at night in a remote location with limited resources.

== Release and recognition ==
At the 77th Cannes Film Festival, Sunflowers Were the First Ones to Know... won the first prize in the La Cinef section. The jury, led by Lubna Azabal, praised the film's storytelling and execution. The award includes a 15,000 euro grant. The film was screened at the Cinema du Pantheon on 3 June and at the MK2 Quai de Seine on 4 June.

=== Accolades ===
Sunflowers Were the First Ones To Know qualifies for Oscars 2025.

Year	Award	Category	Recipient(s)	Result	Ref.
2025	71st National Film Awards	Best Script (Non Feature)	Chidananda S. Naik	Won	
2024	La Cinef	Best Short	Chidananda S. Naik	Won	
2024	Bengaluru International Short Film Festival	Indian Competition	Chidananda S. Naik	Won	
