= Light Thereafter =

2017 Bulgarian film

- Directed by: Konstantin Bojanov
- Screenplay by: Konstantin Bojanov
- Produced by: John Engel; Mila Voinikova
- Starring: Barry Keoghan
- Cinematography: Nenad Boroevich
- Edited by: Anja Siemens
- Music by: Michelino Bisceglia
- Production companies: Multifilm; Left Field Ventures; Film and Music Entertainment
- Release date: 26 January 2017 (International Film Festival Rotterdam)
- Running time: 102 minutes
- Countries: Bulgaria; Belgium
- Language: English

Light Thereafter is a 2017 Bulgarian drama film directed by Konstantin Bojanov starring Barry Keoghan as Pavel, a lonely teenager who is obsessed with the French painter Arnaud.

== Premise ==
Lonely autistic teenager Pavel (Keoghan) travels from London, where he lives with his mother, to France in hopes of meeting Arnaud (Bodnia), a famous French painter. Along the way, he crosses paths with a number of unusual figures including his aunt (Sichov) and Julie (Rigot), a hitchhiker. His ultimate encounter and apprenticeship with Arnaud does not match Pavel's expectation's due to the painter's exacting discipline.

== Cast ==
- Barry Keoghan as Pavel
- Kim Bodnia as Arnaud
- Thure Lindhardt as Piri
- Lubna Azabal as Soumaya
- Solène Rigot as Julie
- Slimane Dazi as Driver
- Catherine Salee as Julie's mother
- Alexis Julemont as Nicholas
- Lucie Debay as Lola
- Margita Gosheva as Miglena
- Dounia Sichov as Eva
- Elitsa Mateva as Nikki
- Sanislava Nikolova as Nuri
- Frederic Etherlink as Conrad
- Alain Bellot as Julie's father
- Fanny Toneur as Nicholas' wife
- Ersin Mustafov as Javier
- John Kinory as Mayfair passerby

== Release ==
Light Thereafter premiered at the 2017 International Film Festival Rotterdam.

== Reception ==
=== Critical reception ===
Jonathan Romney of Screendaily characterized Light Thereafter as "clunkily written" with a "very male" approach to sexuality but praised Barry Keoghan's performance.

=== Accolades ===
Award	Ceremony date	Category	Recipient(s)	Result	Ref.
International Film Festival Rotterdam	5 February 2017	Hivos Tiger Competition	Konstantin Bojanov	Nominated	
Golden Rose Bulgarian Feature Film Festival	10 October 2017	Best Cinematographer Award	Nenad Boroevich	Won	
