= Chidananda S Naik =

Indian director (born 1995)

- Occupation: Director
- Years active: 2023–present
- Notable work: Sunflowers Were the First Ones to Know... (2023)

Chidananda S Naik is an Indian doctor-turned-filmmaker from Mysuru, Karnataka, known for his short film Sunflowers Were the First Ones to Know... In 2024, he won the first prize at La Cinéf, a sidebar competition for student films at the Cannes Film Festival.

== Early life ==
Born in 1995 in Shivamogga, Karnataka, Chidananda pursued a career in medicine and completed his MBBS at Mysore Medical College. He was inspired by Akira Kurosawa's Dreams (1990) during this seventh grade. His experiences with patients led him to explore filmmaking. He then enrolled in a Direction course at FTII, Pune and graduated.

== Career ==
Chidananda made Sunflowers Were the First Ones to Know... in four days at the end of his one-year television course in the Film and Television Institute of India. The 16-minute film is based on a Kannada folk tale. The film premiered at the 2024 Cannes Film Festival and was one of 18 titles judged by a jury of five members, chaired by Belgian actress Lubna Azabal.

Chidananda is the first student from FTII's one-year Television course to win La Cinéf. Commenting on the choice of the jury, director S. S. Rajamouli has rejoiced an Indian short had received it, saying "Indian talent breaching boundaries".

== Filmography ==
- Sunflowers Were the First Ones to Know... (2023) (short film; 16 min)

== Awards ==
- Sunflowers Were the First Ones to Know... - 1st prize at LA CINEF 2024.
- Sunflowers Were the First Ones to Know... - Best Script (Non Feature) at 71st National Film Awards.
- Sunflowers Were the First Ones to Know... - Winner of Indian Competition at Bengaluru International Short Film Festival 2024.
