= The Brink of Dreams =

2024 documentary film

- Arabic: رفعت عيني للسما
- Directed by: Nada Riyadh; Ayman El Amir
- Written by: Nada Riyadh; Ayman El Amir
- Produced by: Nada Riyadh; Ayman El Amir
- Cinematography: Ayman El Amir
- Edited by: Ayman El Amir
- Music by: Ahmed El Sawy
- Production companies: Felluca Films; Dolce Vita Films
- Release date: 17 May 2024 (Cannes)
- Running time: 102 minutes
- Country: Egypt
- Language: Arabic

The Brink of Dreams (Arabic: رفعت عيني للسما, translit. Rafaat einy ll sama) is a 2024 Egyptian documentary film, directed, written, and produced by Nada Riyadh and Ayman El Amir.

The film had its world premiere in the Critics' Week section of the 2024 Cannes Film Festival on 17 May 17, it was theatrically released in Egypt in 2024.

== Plot ==
In order to bring attention to issues that are important to them, like early marriage, domestic abuse, and girls' education, a group of girls resolves to form a theater club and perform plays based on well-known Saidi folklore on the streets of their little village.

== Release ==
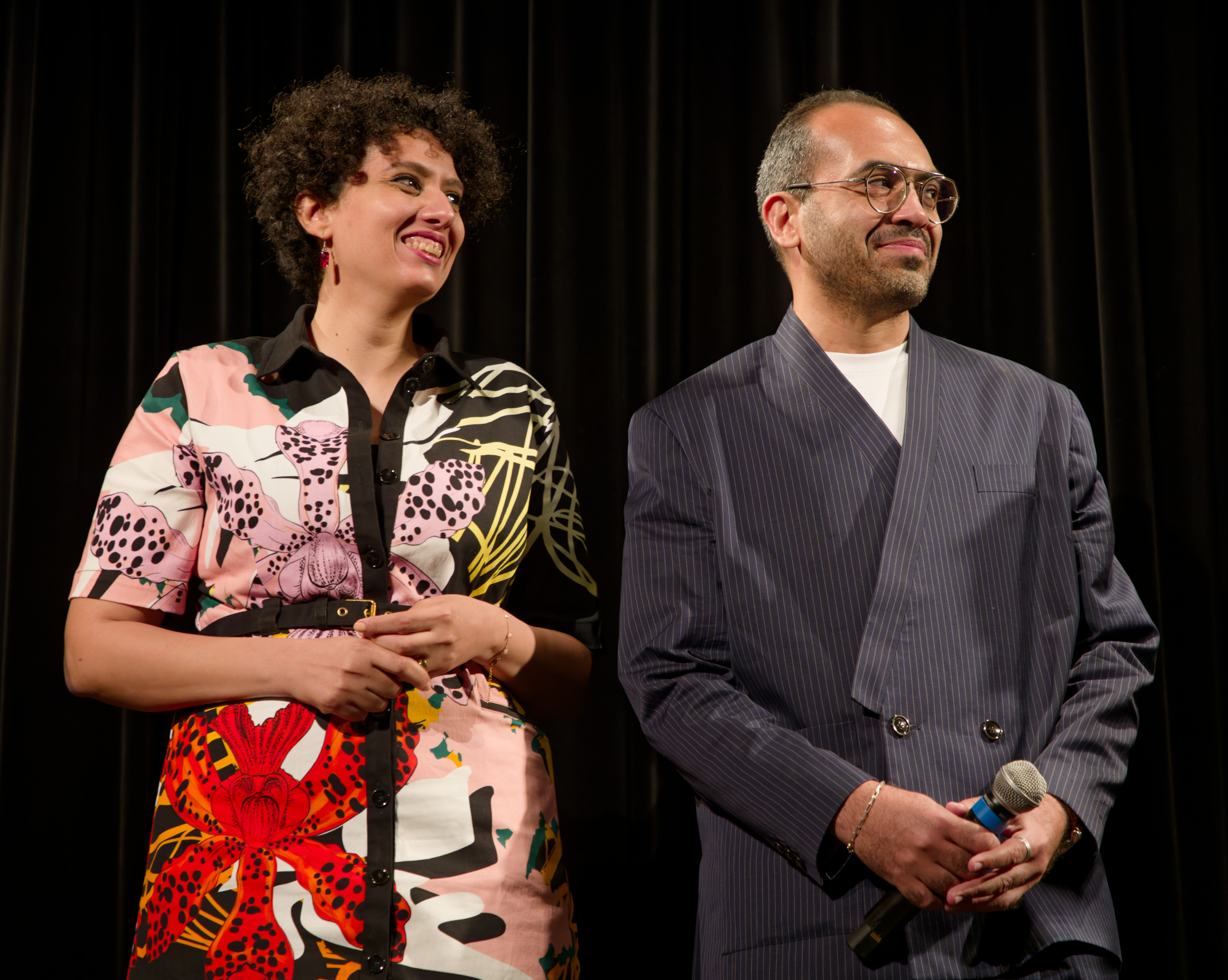
Nada Riyadh and Ayman El Amir at the film's premiere at the 2024 Cannes Film Festival

It had its world premiere at the 2024 Cannes Film Festival in the Special Screenings section on May 17, 2024.

=== Accolades ===
Award	Date of ceremony	Category	Recipient(s)	Result	Ref.
Cannes Film Festival	May 24, 2024	L'Œil d'or (Note: Shared with Ernest Cole: Lost and Found.)	Nada Riyadh, Ayman El Amir	Won	
