= The Village Next to Paradise =

2024 drama film

- Directed by: Mo Harawe
- Story by: Mo Harawe
- Produced by: Sabine Moser; Oliver Neumann; Nuur Abdulkadir Shriwa
- Starring: Ahmed Ali Farah; Anab Ahmed Ibrahim; Ahmed Mohamud Saleban
- Cinematography: Mostafa El Kashef
- Production companies: FreibeuterFilm; Kazak Productions; NiKo Film; Maanmaal ACC
- Release date: 21 May 2024 (Cannes)
- Running time: 132 minutes
- Countries: Austria; France; Somalia
- Box office: $116,351

The Village Next to Paradise is a 2024 drama film written and directed by Mo Harawe in his feature-length debut. Starring Ahmed Ali Farah, Ahmed Mohamud Saleban, and Anab Ahmed Ibrahim as a family in turmoil, The Village Next to Paradise was the first Somali film to be featured in the Official Selection of the Cannes Film Festival.

The film was shot in Nugal region of Puntland's capital, Garowe and coastal city Eyl. The Village Next to Paradise grossed $116,351 at the worldwide box office and received generally positive reviews, with praise for the thriller scenes.

== Premise ==
Mamargrade (Farah) struggles to raise his son Cigaal (Saleban) in their rural Somali village amidst conflict, natural disasters, and the constant presence of drones from the United States. Their family dynamic is further altered by the arrival of Marmargrade's sister Araweelo (Ibrahim), who is seeking a fresh start after her divorce.

== Cast ==
- Ahmed Ali Farah as Mamamrgrade
- Anab Ahmed Ibrahim as Araweelo
- Ahmed Mohamud Saleban as Cigaal

== Production ==
The film was shot in Somalia with a principal cast of first-time actors.

== Release ==
The Village Next to Paradise premiered on May 21, 2024, in the Un Certain Regard portion of the Cannes Film Festival, where it was eligible for the Camera d'Or award. It has also been selected for the MAMI Mumbai Film Festival 2024 under the World Cinema section. It had its French theatrical debut in Paris on April 9th, 2025.

== Reception ==
=== Critical response ===
On the review aggregator website Rotten Tomatoes, 100% of 6 critics' reviews are positive, with an average rating of 7/10.

=== Accolades ===
Award	Ceremony date	Category	Recipient(s)	Result	Ref.
Cannes Film Festival	24 May 2024	Un Certain Regard	The Village Next to Paradise	Nominated	
Cannes Film Festival	25 May 2024	Camera d'Or	The Village Next to Paradise	Pending	
