= Emanuel Pârvu =

Romanian actor and filmmaker (born 1979)

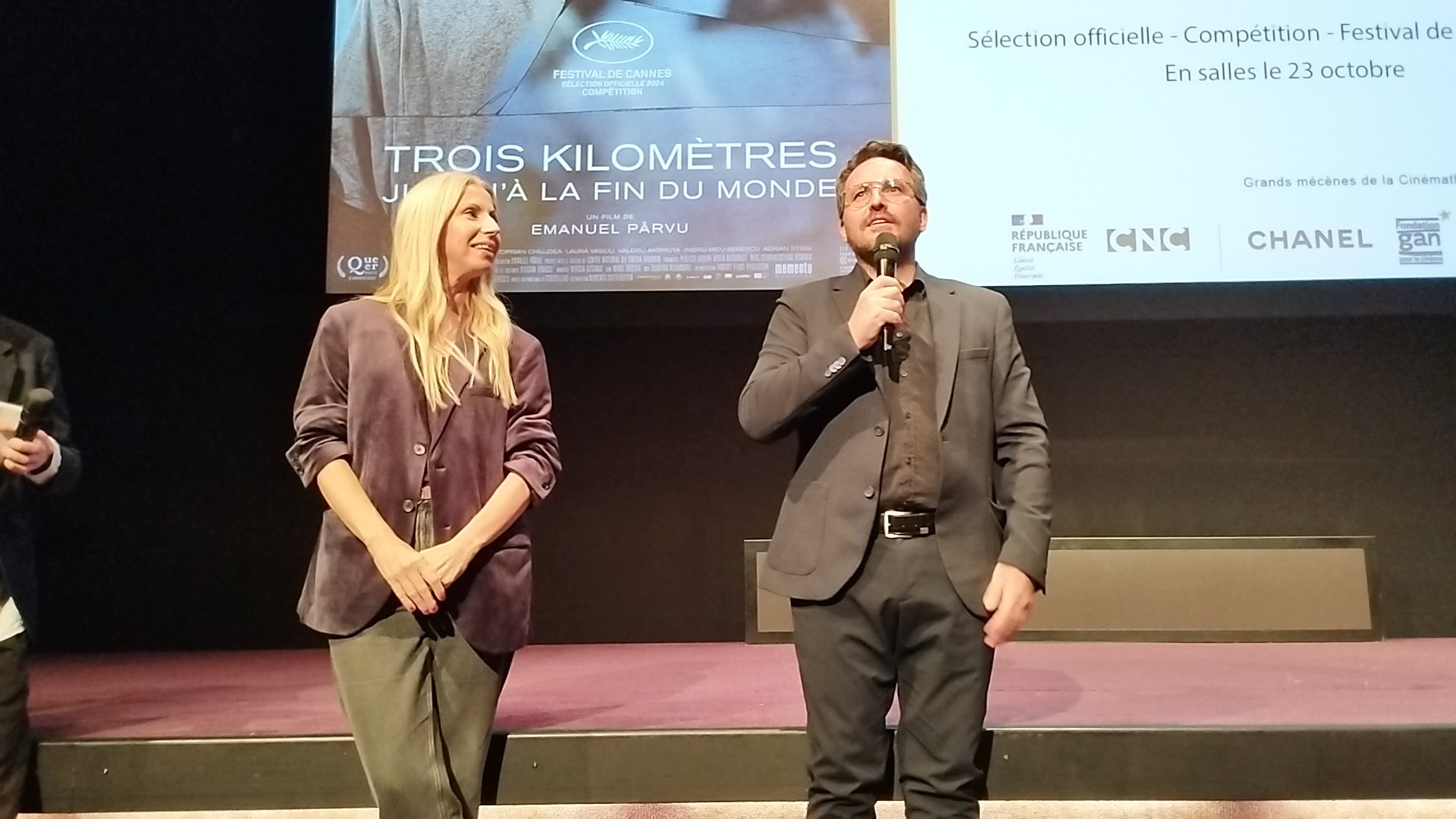
- Pârvu in 2024
- Born: 1979 (age 46–47); Bucharest, Romania

Emanuel Pârvu (born 1979) is a Romanian actor and filmmaker.

== Career ==
Pârvu studied acting at the I. L. Caragiale National University of Theatre and Film.

After working as a stage and screen actor, Pârvu made his directorial debut with the short film A Family in 2009. This was followed by in subsequent years by the short films Chicken, Fries, and Coke, 2, Square One, and Meda.

Pârvu won the Best Director award at the 2017 Sarajevo Film Festival for his feature debut, Meda or the Not So Bright Side of Things. His second feature film, Mikado, premiered at the San Sebastián International Film Festival in 2021.

Pârvu's third feature, Three Kilometres to the End of the World, was selected to compete for the Palme d'Or at the 2024 Cannes Film Festival, and won the Queer Palm award.

== Filmography ==
=== Film ===
Year	Title	Director	Writer	Actor	Role	Notes	Ref.
2009	Tales from the Golden Age	No	No	Yes	The Party Inspector	"The Legend of the Official Visit" segment	
2009	A Family	Yes	Yes	Yes	Husband	Short film	
2010	Portrait of the Fighter as a Young Man	No	No	Yes	Cpt. Seciu	—N/a	
2012	Chicken, Fries, and Coke	Yes	Yes	No	—N/a	Short film	
2013	2	Yes	Yes	No	—N/a	Short film	
2013	Square One	Yes	Yes	Yes		Short film	
2016	Meda	Yes	Yes	No	—N/a	Short film	
2016	Graduation	No	No	Yes	Prosecutor Ivascu	—N/a	
2016	The Fixer	No	No	Yes	Prosecutor Ivascu	—N/a	
2017	Meda or the Not So Bright Side of Things	Yes	Yes	No	—N/a	—N/a	
2017	The Anniversary	No	No	Yes	Sandu	—N/a	
2019	5 Minutes Too Late	No	No	Yes	Coman	—N/a	
2020	9 povesti de dragoste si ura in izolare	No	No	Yes		—N/a	
2020	Unidentified	No	No	Yes	Marius Preda	—N/a	
2021	Mikado	Yes	Yes	No	—N/a	—N/a	
2021	The Ladder	No	No	Yes	Prezan	—N/a	
2021	Miracle	No	No	Yes	Marius Preda	—N/a	
2023	Familiar	No	No	Yes	Dragos Binder	—N/a	
2024	Three Kilometres to the End of the World	Yes	Yes	No	—N/a	—N/a	

Key
†	Denotes film or TV productions that have not yet been released

=== Television ===
Year	Title	Director	Writer	Actor	Role	Notes	Ref.
2005	Catherine the Great	No	No	Yes	Alexei Orloff	TV movie	
2006	Pumpkinhead: Ashes to Ashes	No	No	Yes	Oliver Allen	TV movie	
2006–2007	La urgenta	No	No	Yes	Edi Leonte	7 episodes	
2009–2018	În Puii Mei!	Yes	Yes	Yes	Various	64 episodes	
2018	Hackerville	No	No	Yes	Tomi Damaschin	4 episodes	

== Awards and nominations ==
Year	Award	Category	Nominated work	Result	Ref.
2017	Sarajevo Film Festival	Best Director	Meda or the Not So Bright Side of Things	Won	
2021	Gopo Awards	Best Supporting Actor	5 Minutes Too Late	Won	
2024	Cannes Film Festival	Palme d'Or	Three Kilometres to the End of the World	Nominated	
2024	Cannes Film Festival	Queer Palm	Three Kilometres to the End of the World	Won	

=== Honours ===
- 2025 – Pârvu was appointed the jury member at the 31st Sarajevo Film Festival for Competition Programme – Feature Film.
