= Unidentified (2020 film) =

- Directed by: Bogdan George Apetri
- Written by: Bogdan George Apetri; Iulian Postelnicu
- Produced by: Bogdan George Apetri; Florin Șerban
- Starring: Bogdan Farcaș; Dragos Dumitru; Vasile Muraru; Ana Popescu; Kira Hagi; Andrei Aradits
- Cinematography: Oleg Mutu
- Edited by: Bogdan George Apetri
- Production company: Fantascope Films
- Release dates: 12 October 2020 (Warsaw Film Festival); 6 August 2021 (Romania)
- Running time: 123 minutes
- Country: Romania
- Language: Romanian

Unidentified (Romanian: Neidentificat) is a 2020 Romanian thriller film directed by Bogdan George Apetri, starring Bogdan Farcaș, Dragos Dumitru, Vasile Muraru, Ana Popescu, Kira Hagi and Andrei Aradits.

== Cast ==
- Bogdan Farcaș as Florin Iespas
- Dragos Dumitru as Banel
- Vasile Muraru as Comisar Sef
- Ana Popescu as Stela Bercaru
- Kira Hagi as Simona Muntean
- Andrei Aradits as Mircea
- Emanuel Pârvu as Marius Preda
- Olimpia Mălai as Lizuca
- Ion Bechet as Dragos Chirila
- Ovidiu Crisan as Misu Macarie
- Vlad Dolanescu as Ovidiu Preda
- Cezar Antal as Batin
- Valentin Popescu as Dr. Ivan
- Mircea Florin Jr. as Nelu
- Ioana Bugarin as Cristina Tofan
- Ana Ularu as Dr. Natalia Marcu

== Reception ==
Wendy Ide of Screen Daily called the film a "grimly efficient character study of a flawed and damaged man".

Michael Talbot-Haynes of Film Threat gave the film a score of 9/10 and called it a "superior portrait of the abyss that yawns beneath so many", and praised the direction, the performances and the screenplay.

Paul Petrache of Vice wrote a positive review of the film.
