= Avé (film) =

2011 film

- Film poster
- Directed by: Konstantin Bojanov
- Written by: Arnold Barkus; Konstantin Bojanov
- Produced by: Konstantin Bojanov
- Starring: Anjela Nedyalkova
- Release dates: 17 May 2011 (Cannes); 12 October 2011 (Bulgaria)
- Running time: 86 minutes
- Country: Bulgaria
- Language: Bulgarian

Avé is a 2011 Bulgarian drama film directed by Konstantin Bojanov. The film is Bojanov's narrative film debut. His first film was a documentary about heroin users in Sofia.

== Cast ==
- Anjela Nedyalkova as Ave
- Ovanes Torosian as Kamen
- Martin Brambach as Truck-driver
- Svetla Yancheva as Viki's Mother
- Bruno S. as Viki's Grandfather

== Awards ==
In 2011, Avé won the Special Jury Prize at the Sarajevo Film Festival.
