= Do Not Enter (2024 film) =

- Theatrical release poster
- Directed by: Hugo Cardozo
- Written by: Hugo Cardozo
- Produced by: René Ruíz Díaz; Guido Rud; Hugo Cardozo
- Starring: Lucas Caballero; Pablo Martínez
- Cinematography: Edgar Cardozo
- Edited by: Edgar Cardozo; Bryan Cardozo; Hugo Cardozo
- Music by: Hugo Cardozo
- Production companies: Urban Achievers; FilmSharks; HJ Producciones
- Distributed by: El Cuervo Filmes
- Release dates: May 15, 2024 (Cannes); August 15, 2024 (Paraguay)
- Running time: 85 minutes
- Countries: Paraguay; Argentina
- Language: Spanish

Do Not Enter (Spanish: No entres) is a 2024 supernatural horror thriller film written, filmed, co-edited, co-scored, co-produced and directed by Hugo Cardozo. Starring Lucas Caballero and Pablo Martínez who play two fame-hungry YouTubers who are trapped in a dark and gloomy environment when they enter a mysterious house. The rest of the cast is completed by Rafael Alfaro, Lara Chamorro, Andy Romero, Mario González Martí, Ariel Delgadillo and Lia Love.

Do Not Enter had its world premiere at the 77th Cannes Film Festival on 15 May 2024 at the 2nd Fantastic Pavilion Gala.

== Synopsis ==
After causing a great impact with fake captures of paranormal images in an abandoned mansion, two young YouTubers return to the place (at the request of their followers) to investigate further and discover the terrifying past of its former owners. Trapped in a dimension of torture and death, they fight to escape the dark energy that hides within the walls of the mysterious house.

== Cast ==
- Pablo Martínez as Cristian
- Lucas Caballero as Aldo
- Rafael Alfaro
- Lara Chamorro
- Andy Romero
- Mario González Martí
- Ariel Delgadillo
- Lia Love

== Production ==
Principal photography took place in Altos and San Bernardino, Paraguay in 2022.

== Release ==
It had its world premiere on May 15, 2024, at the 77th Cannes Film Festival then was commercially released on August 15, 2024, in Paraguayan theaters. It was screened on October 5, 2024, at the 29th Busan International Film Festival as part of the Midnight Passion section. International distribution rights were sold to Busch Media for Germany, Austria and Switzerland; PlayArte for Brazil; Nos Lusomundo for Portugal; and Corazón Films for Mexico.
