= Boris Lojkine =

French filmmaker (born 1969)

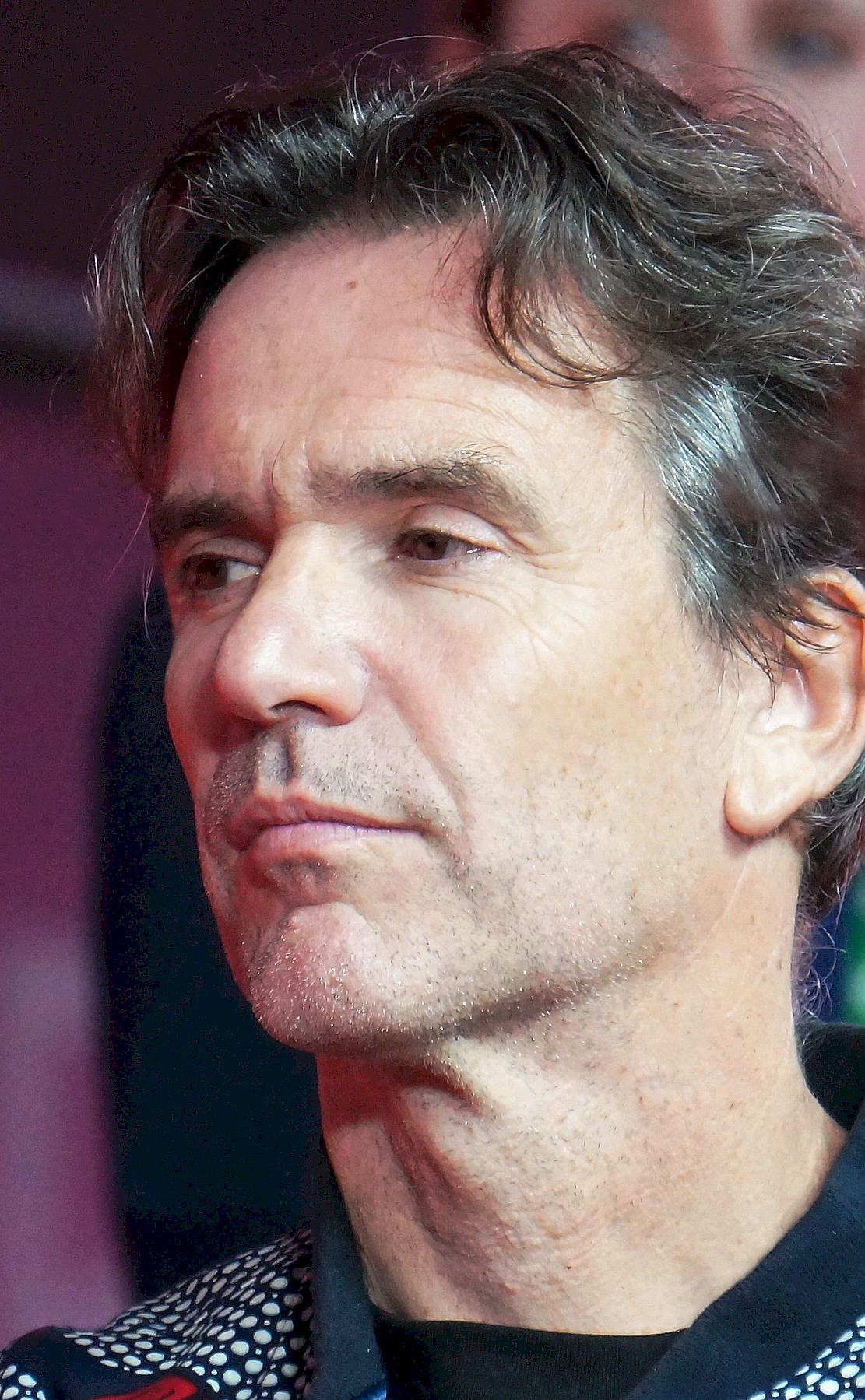
- Born: 24 July 1969 (age 56); Paris, France
- Occupation: Film director
- Years active: 2001 – present

Boris Lojkine (born 24 July 1969) is a French film director. He is particularly known for his 2024 feature film Souleymane's Story.

== Early life and education ==
Boris Lojkine was born in Paris on 24 July 1969. His Russian grandfather escaped to France after fighting in the Civil war against the Bolsheviks. His grandmother was a Polish Jew, who also had to flee from her country.

He studied at the École normale supérieure.

== Career ==
Prior to his film career, Lojkine taught philosophy at Aix-Marseille University. His first film projects were documentaries inspired by his time in Vietnam.

Lojkine's narrative feature debut, Hope, screened at the Critics' Week section of the 2014 Cannes Film Festival. His second narrative feature, Camille, won the Audience Award at the 2019 Locarno Film Festival.

In 2024, Lojkine's feature Souleymane's Story was selected to screen in the Un Certain Regard portion of the 77th Cannes Film Festival. It went on to be nominated for many awards, including several Cesar Awards, winning some of them.

As a producer, he worked on Rafiki Fariala's fiction debut Congo Boy.

== Filmography ==
Year	Title	Director	Writer	Editor	Notes	Ref.
2001	Ceux qui restent	Yes	No	No	Documentary short film	
2004	Les chantiers de la coopération	Yes	Yes	No	Documentary short film	
2005	Wandering Souls	Yes	No	No	Documentary short film	
2014	Hope	Yes	Yes	No	—N/a	
2018	Alone at my Wedding	No	Yes	No	Directed by Marta Bergman	
2019	Camille	Yes	Yes	No	—N/a	
2021	We, Students!	No	No	Yes	Directed by Rafiki Fariala	
2024	Souleymane's Story	Yes	Yes	No	—N/a	

== Awards and nominations ==
Year	Award	Category	Nominated work	Result	Ref.
2014	Critics' Week	Prix SACD	Hope	Won	
2019	Locarno Film Festival	Audience Award	Camille	Won	
2024	Cannes Film Festival	Un Certain Regard	The Story of Souleymane	Nominated	
