= Anasuya Sengupta (actress) =

Indian-Bengali actress

- Born: Kolkata, India
- Education: Jadavpur University
- Occupation: Actress
- Years active: 2009–present
- Spouse: Cdr Yashdeep Sharma
- Father: Himadri Sengupta
- Awards: Best Performance in Un Certain Regard Award (2024)

Anasuya Sengupta is an Indian actress and production designer. She has established a career in the film industry, as well as winning the Performance Awards in the Un Certain Regard Award category at the 2024 Cannes Film Festival.

== Early life ==
Sengupta was born and brought up in a Bengali family in Kolkata, West Bengal. She obtained a Bachelor of Arts degree in English literature from Jadavpur University, but wanted to establish herself as a journalist.

== Career ==
Anasuya Sengupta gained widespread recognition for her performance in The Shameless (2024). In addition to her work in film, she has been actively involved in theatre and production design, having started her career with Madly Bangalee, directed by Anjan Dutt and worked as a director's assistant to Claire McCarthy for The Waiting City that same year. Over the years, she has expanded her presence beyond acting, appearing on the cover of Harper's Magazine and walking the ramp at Lakmé Fashion Week for designer Sameer Madan. She was also featured on an Amul billboard and has been recognized with accolades from Cheries Cheris and Plurielles.

== Awards ==
Sengupta won the Performance Awards in the Un Certain Regard Award category of the Cannes Film Festival, making her the first Indian actress to achieve this honor. She won the award for her performance in The Shameless (2024).
