= Chou Tung-Yen =

Chinese theatre director, filmmaker, and scenographer

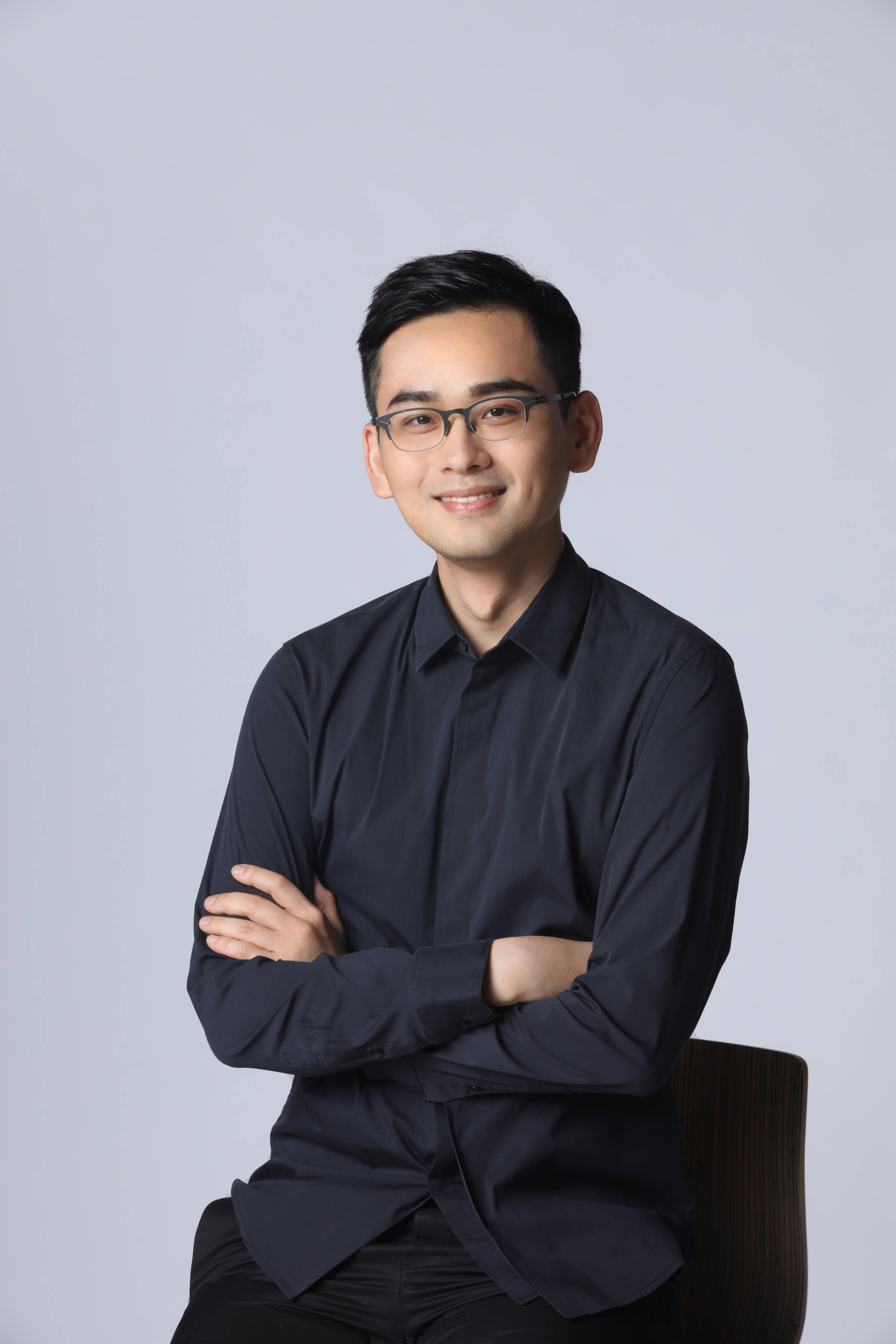
- Born: August 18, 1981 (age 44); Taiwan
- Education: Taipei National University of the Arts, Central Saint Martins
- Occupations: Theatre and Film Director
- Website: https://www.vmstudio.tw/

Chou Tung-Yen (Chinese: 周東彥; born 18 August 1981) is a Taiwanese theatre director, filmmaker and scenographer and founder of Very Mainstream Studio and Very Theatre in Taipei.

== Education ==
Chou holds a MA in Scenography with distinction from Central Saint Martins of Art and Design in London and a BFA in Theatre Directing from Taipei National University of the Arts.

== Career ==
Chou is the founder and artistic director of Very Mainstream Studio & Very Theatre Company. His works focus on reflecting contemporary culture and use new media as a basis to create interdisciplinary theatrical works that merge reality and virtuality.

His works have been performed internationally and have received many awards. For instance, “Emptied Memories” received the best interactive and new media design award of World Stage Design Festival in Cardiff in 2013. “Teatime with me, myself and I” has toured to 10 cities around the world. “Chronicle of Lightyear: Taipei - Copenhagen” was co-produced with Culture Yard in Denmark, which premiered in Taipei Art Festival and was invited to perform in Ars Electronica Festival, Linz in 2018.

Other than theatrical performances, his works also include short films and documentaries, which have screened in several international festivals, such as the Golden Horse Festival, the Seattle International Film Festival and the OutFest in LA.

Chou is also currently a lecturer in Taipei National University of the Arts.

== Notable Works and Collaborations ==
=== Very Theatre ===
- Shifting Connection (2026, XR multi-user worldpremiere Taiwan Fine Art Museum
- 8 Degrees of Freedom(2025, XR theater multi-user), worldpremiere Taichung Theater, Taichung, Taipei
- Free UR Head (2023, XR multi-user), worldpremiere Koahsiung Festival, Taiwan // international premiere Venice Immersive 2024
- Traversing the Mist (2023, XR roaming multi-user 6DoF), world premiere IDFA DocLAB
- Gazing, In the Mist (2022, XR theater multi-user)
- To Be Honest With You (2022, online performance)
- In the Mist (2020, VR film), worldpremiere Venice Immersive 2021,
- Virtual Intimacy (2020, performance), co-directed with Edwin Kemp Attrill, co-produced with ActNow Theatre, Adelaide
- Facing Cities (2019-2020, performance), co-produced with WERC Collective, Groningen
- Chronicle of Light Year: Taipei - Copenhagen (2018, performance), co-produced with Kulturværftet, Helsingør
- Wandering in Time (2016, performance)
- Teatime with Me, Myself and I (2014, performance)
- Emptied Memories (2012, performance)

=== Very Mainstream Studio ===
- Send in a Cloud (2022, projection design), directed by Cheng Tsung-Lung at Cloud Gate Dance Theater of Taiwan
- Kiss (2021) (2021, short film)
- Looking For? (2017, documentary)
- Formosa (2017, projection design), directed by Lin Hwai-min at Cloud Gate Dance Theater of Taiwan
- My Leftover Ladies (2014, documentary)
- Voyage in Time (2012, documentary)

== Awards and nominations ==
- 2024 Grand Jury Prize at NewImages Festival for Traversing the Mist - Bathhouse Odyssey ‘Traversing the Mist’ Takes Top Prize at Paris’ NewImages
- 2022 World Stage Design Award for Projection Design for “Chronicle of Light Year: Taipei - Copenhagen” and “Formosa”
- 2021 Panorama VR Prize at Festival du Nouveau Cinéma de Montréal for In the Mist
- 2018 Knight of Illumination Projection Design Award for Formosa
- 2017 Golden Horse Film Festival and Awards Best Documentary Award nomination for Looking For?
- 2016 Festival Bains Numeriques International Digital Arts Award nomination for Teatime with Me, Myself and I
- 2016 Golden Harvest Awards for Outstanding Short Films nomination for My Leftover Ladies
- 2013 World Stage Design Award for Interactive and New Media for Emptied Memories
