= Saudi Film Commission =

KSA agency to promote film industry

Agency overview
- Formed: 2020; 6 years ago
- Jurisdiction: Government of Saudi Arabia
- Headquarters: Riyadh, Saudi Arabia
- Agency executives: Abdullah Al-Eyaf, CEO; Abduljalil Al-Nasser, General Manager, Sector Development and Investment
- Website: Official English Website

The Saudi Film Commission is a commission of the Ministry of Culture within the government of Saudi Arabia. Established in 2020 under the Ministry of Culture, the Commission supports local filmmakers, attracts international productions, and works to position Saudi Arabia as a regional and global hub for cinema. Its activities form part of the Kingdom’s broader cultural and economic transformation under Vision 2030.

== History ==
The Commission was formally established in February 2020 by the Saudi Council of Ministers as an affiliate of the Ministry of Culture. Its founding mission is to nurture a sustainable film environment, support local storytellers, foster industry capacity, and attract international productions. The SFC is responsible for coordinating film policy, supporting emerging creatives, and integrating Saudi Arabia into global cinematic networks.

In 2018, a 35-year ban on cinemas was lifted in Saudi Arabia as part of the country's broader modernization efforts overseen by Crown Prince Mohammed bin Salman. The Saudi Film Commission was founded as a branch of the Ministry of Culture in February 2020 to bolster the country's film industry.

In June 2024, the Saudi Film Commission became a member of the Association of Film Commissioners International (AFCI) to enhance Saudi Arabia's presence in the global film industry and facilitate collaboration between national production companies and local talents with international counterparts. The Commission is governed by a board of directors chaired by the Minister of Culture, with a chief executive officer appointed to oversee daily operations. The Commission operates with financial and administrative autonomy, with its budget included in the Ministry of Culture’s annual allocation.

== Initiatives ==
=== 101 Film Studio ===
The 101 Film Studio is a partnership with the Saudi Ministry of Education to provide film education to middle and high school students in the country.

=== Daw' Film Competition ===
In 2019, prior to the official founding of the Saudi Film Commission, the Ministry of Culture established the Daw' Competition to financially support young Saudi filmmakers. The contest is now administered through the Saudi Film Commission.

=== Filmmakers Program ===
The Saudi Film Commission Filmmakers Program was established in 2021 to train and support local talent through the filmmaking process.

=== Film Saudi ===
Representatives of the commission announced Film Saudi, a 40% cash rebate program to incentivize productions that film in the kingdom and hire local talent, at the 2022 Cannes Film Festival.

=== Film Deposit ===
In August 2024, the commission launched the Film Deposit initiative through the National Film Archive to collect and preserve Saudi films. The initiative began with the Saudi Film Registry, which contained information on more than 1,000 feature films and documentaries, and offered three deposit options: secure storage, access for academic research, and public access.

=== Cinamaa ===
In April 2025, the Saudi Film Commission and the National Film Archive launched Cinamaa, an online platform focused on film studies. The platform provides access to articles, research, discussions, workshops and short films for aspiring filmmakers, critics and film enthusiasts.
