= Paris Film Critics Association Awards =

French film critics association

- Abbreviation: PFCA
- Formation: 2021
- Founder: Sam Bobino
- Type: Film criticism
- Location: Paris, France
- Members: 80 (2023)
- Official language: French and English
- Website: parisfilmcritics.com

The Paris Film Critics Association (PFCA) is a French film critic organization founded in 2021 by journalist Sam Bobino. The organization votes on the annual Paris Film Critics Association Awards, honoring French and international films and TV series.

== Background ==
Its membership comprises film critics and journalists based in Paris. Each year, the organization votes on the Paris Film Critics Association Awards, honoring members of the French and international film industry who have excelled in their fields over the calendar year. These awards are presented each February at a ceremony held in Paris. The PFCA also honors industry veterans with its annual Lifetime Achievement Award and Honorary Award.

== Awards ==
=== 2022 ===
The nominees were announced on 12 January 2022. The winners were announced on 7 February 2022 at an award ceremony held at the Hotel Le Royal Monceau-Raffles in Paris. 50 journalists voted for the awards.

Winners are listed first, highlighted in boldface, and indicated with a double dagger (‡).

**Best Film**: **Lost Illusions – Xavier Giannoli** ‡; Annette – Leos Carax; Drive My Car – Ryusuke Hamaguchi; Happening – Audrey Diwan; Onoda: 10,000 Nights in the Jungle – Arthur Harari; The Card Counter – Paul Schrader	**Best Director**: **Arthur Harari – Onoda: 10,000 Nights in the Jungle** ‡; Audrey Diwan – Happening; Denis Villeneuve – Dune; Julia Ducournau – Titane; Leos Carax – Annette; Xavier Giannoli – Lost Illusions
**Best First Film**: **The Father – Florian Zeller** ‡; Gagarine – Fanny Liatard and Jérémy Trouilh; The Swarm – Just Philippot; Magnetic Beats – Vincent Maël Cardona; Sound of Metal – Darius Marder; Pleasure – Ninja Thyberg	**Best Documentary**: **The Velvet Queen – Vincent Munier and Marie Amiguet** ‡; Delphine and Carole – Callisto McNulty; Indes galantes – Philippe Béziat; The State of Texas vs. Melissa – Sabrina Van Tassel; Their Algeria – Lina Soualem; The Beatles: Get Back – Peter Jackson
**Best Actor**: **Benoît Magimel – Peaceful** ‡; Adam Driver – Annette; Anthony Hopkins – The Father; Oscar Isaac – The Card Counter; Vincent Lindon – Titane; Yuya Endo – Onoda: 10,000 Nights in the Jungle	**Best Actress**: **Anamaria Vartolomei – Happening** ‡; Lady Gaga – House of Gucci; Marion Cotillard – Annette; Penélope Cruz – Parallel Mothers; Renate Reinsve – The Worst Person in the World; Valeria Bruni Tedeschi – The Divide; Valérie Lemercier – Aline
**Best Supporting Actor**: **Vincent Lacoste – Lost Illusions** ‡; Adam Driver – The Last Duel; Al Pacino – House of Gucci; Karim Leklou – BAC Nord; Lambert Wilson – Benedetta; Willem Dafoe – The Card Counter	**Best Supporting Actress**: **Olivia Colman – The Father** ‡; Charlotte Rampling – Benedetta; Cécile de France – Lost Illusions; Jodie Comer – The Last Duel; Meryl Streep – Don't Look Up; Tōko Miura – Drive My Car
**Best Male Revelation**: **Makita Samba – Paris, 13th District** ‡; Abdel Bendaher – Ibrahim; Alseni Bathily – Gagarine; Filippo Scotti – The Hand of God; Sami Outalbali – A Tale of Love and Desire; Thimotée Robart – Les Magnétiques	**Best Female Revelation**: **Agathe Rousselle – Titane** ‡; Aïssatou Diallo Sagna – The Divide; Daphné Patakia – Benedetta; Lucie Zhang – Paris, 13th District; Zbeida Belhajamor – A Tale of Love and Desire
**Best Original Screenplay**: **Don't Look Up – Adam McKay & David Sirota** ‡; Onoda: 10,000 Nights in the Jungle – Arthur Harari & Vincent Poymiro; A Hero – Asghar Farhadi; Aline – Brigitte Buc & Valérie Lemercier; The Divide – Catherine Corsini; Annette – Leos Carax, Ron Mael & Russell Mael	**Best Adapted Screenplay**: **Happening – Audrey Diwan & Marcia Romano** ‡; The Father – Christopher Hampton & Florian Zeller; Dune – Denis Villeneuve, Eric Roth & Jon Spaihts; Paris, 13th District – Jacques Audiard, Céline Sciamma & Léa Mysius; Drive My Car – Ryusuke Hamaguchi & Takamasa Oe; Lost Illusions – Xavier Giannoli & Jacques Fieschi
**Best Cinematography**: **Annette – Caroline Champetier** ‡; Lost Illusions – Christophe Beaucarne; Dune – Greig Fraser; West Side Story – Janusz Kamiński; Titane – Ruben Impens; Onoda: 10,000 Nights in the Jungle – Tom Harari	**Best Editing**: **BAC Nord – Simon Jacquet** ‡; Lost Illusions – Cyril Nakache; Titane – Jean-Christophe Bouzy; Onoda: 10,000 Nights in the Jungle – Laurent Sénéchal; Petrov's Flu – Yuri Karikh; Annette – Nelly Quettier
**Best Original Score**: **Annette – Ron Mael & Russell Mael / Sparks** ‡; Parallel Mothers – Alberto Iglesias; The French Dispatch – Alexandre Desplat; Dune – Hans Zimmer; Paris, 13th District – Rone; The Velvet Queen – Warren Ellis, Nick Cave	**Best Animated Film**: **The Summit of the Gods – Patrick Imbert** ‡; Encanto – Jared Bush & Byron Howard; The Crossing – Florence Miailhe; Luca – Enrico Casarosa; Where Is Anne Frank – Ari Folman; Sing 2 – Garth Jennings & Christophe Lourdelet
**Lifetime Achievement Award**: **Claude Lelouch**

=== 2023 ===
The nominees were announced on 19 January 2023. The winners were announced on 5 February 2023 at an award ceremony held at the theater Silencio des Prés in Paris. 80 journalists voted for the awards.

**Best Film**: **The Night of the 12th – Dominik Moll** ‡; The Beasts – Rodrigo Sorogoyen; Armageddon Time – James Gray; Avatar: The Way of Water – James Cameron; Decision to Leave – Park Chan-wook; Pacifiction – Albert Serra; Saint Omer – Alice Diop	**Best Director**: **James Cameron – Avatar: The Way of Water** ‡; Albert Serra – Pacifiction; Dominik Moll – The Night of the 12th; Gaspar Noé – Vortex; Jean-Jacques Annaud – Notre-Dame on Fire; Jerzy Skolimowski – EO; Paul Thomas Anderson – Licorice Pizza; Valeria Bruni Tedeschi – Forever Young
**Best First Film**: **Falcon Lake – Charlotte Le Bon** ‡; Bruno Reidal – Vincent Le Port; Joyland – Saim Sadiq; The Worst Ones – Lise Akoka & Romane Gueret; The Sixth Child – Léopold Legrand; Rodeo – Lola Quivoron	**Best Documentary**: **The Beatles: Get Back – The Rooftop Concert – Peter Jackson** ‡; Rookies – Thierry Demaizière and Alban Teurlai; Ennio – Giuseppe Tornatore; Flickering Ghosts of Loves Gone By – André Bonzel; The Super 8 Years – Annie Ernaux & David Ernaux-Briot; Michael Cimino, God Bless America – Jean-Baptiste Thoret; Patrick Dewaere, My Hero – Alexandre Moix
**Best Actor**: **Benoît Magimel – Pacifiction** ‡; Austin Butler – Elvis; Bastien Bouillon – The Night of the 12th; Colin Farrell – The Banshees of Inisherin; Denis Ménochet – The Beasts; Gérard Depardieu – Maigret; Louis Garrel – The Innocent	**Best Actress**: **Virginie Efira – Paris Memories** ‡; Virginie Efira – Other People's Children; Adèle Exarchopoulos – Zero Fucks Given; Ana de Armas – Blonde; Guslagie Malanda – Saint Omer; Laure Calamy – Full Time; Noémie Merlant – The Innocent
**Best Supporting Actor**: **Roschdy Zem – The Innocent** ‡; Anthony Hopkins – Armageddon Time; Bradley Cooper – Licorice Pizza; Bouli Lanners – The Night of the 12th; Finnegan Oldfield – Final Cut; Louis Garrel – Forever Young; Tom Hanks – Elvis	**Best Supporting Actress**: **Anouk Grinberg – The Innocent & The Night of the 12th** ‡; Angela Bassett – Black Panther: Wakanda Forever; Carey Mulligan – She Said; Dominique Blanc – The Origin of Evil; Isabelle Adjani – Masquerade; Jamie Lee Curtis – Everything Everywhere All at Once; Sara Giraudeau – The Sixth Child
**Best Male Revelation**: **Stefan Crepon – Peter von Kant** ‡; Adam Bessa – Harka; Alyosha Reinert – Softie; Cooper Hoffman – Licorice Pizza; Dimitri Doré – Bruno Reidal; Eden Dambrine – Close; Paul Kircher – Winter Boy	**Best Female Revelation**: **Nadia Tereszkiewicz – Forever Young** ‡; Alana Haim – Licorice Pizza; Guslagie Malanda – Saint Omer; Kayije Kagame – Saint Omer; Mallory Wanecque – The Worst Ones; Marion Barbeau – Rise; Rebecca Marder – A Radiant Girl
**Best Original Screenplay**: **Boy from Heaven – Tarik Saleh** ‡; Armageddon Time – James Gray; The Beasts – Rodrigo Sorogoyen & Isabel Peña; The Banshees of Inisherin – Martin McDonagh; Licorice Pizza – Paul Thomas Anderson; The Innocent – Louis Garrel & Tanguy Viel; Saint Omer – Amrita David, Alice Diop & Marie NDiaye	**Best Adapted Screenplay**: **The Night of the 12th – Dominik Moll & Gilles Marchand** ‡; Farewell, Mr. Haffmann – Fred Cavayé & Sarah Kaminsky; The Colors of Fire – Pierre Lemaitre; Undercover – Thierry de Peretti & Jeanne Aptekman; The Sixth Child – Léopold Legrand & Catherine Paillé; Between Two Worlds – Emmanuel Carrère & Hélène Devynck; White Noise – Noah Baumbach
**Best Cinematography**: **Pacifiction – Artur Tort** ‡; Armageddon Time – Darius Khondji; Avatar: The Way of Water – Russell Carpenter; Elvis – Mandy Walker; Licorice Pizza – Paul Thomas Anderson; Nightmare Alley – Dan Laustsen; Vortex – Benoit Debie	**Best Editing**: **Decision to Leave – Kim Sang-bum** ‡; Athena – Benjamin Weill; Avatar: The Way of Water – David Brenner, James Cameron, John Refoua & Stephen E. Rivkin; Bullet Train – Elisabet Ronaldsdottir; Elvis – Matt Villa & Jonathan Redmond; Everything Everywhere All at Once – Paul Rogers; Top Gun: Maverick – Eddie Hamilton
**Best Original Score**: **Guillermo del Toro's Pinocchio – Alexandre Desplat** ‡; Full Time – Irène Drésel; EO – Paweł Mykietyn; A Tale of Love and Desire – Benjamin Biolay; The Night of the 12th – Olivier Marguerit; Nope – Michael Abels; The Banshees of Inisherin – Carter Burwell	**Best Production Design**: **Pacifiction – Sebastian Vogler** ‡; Avatar: The Way of Water – Dylan Cole & Ben Procter; Elvis – Catherine Martin & Karen Murphy; Licorice Pizza – Florencia Martin; Nightmare Alley – Tamara Deverell; Notre-Dame on Fire – Jean Rabasse; Nope – Ruth De Jong
**Best Animated Film**: **Little Nicholas: Happy As Can Be – Amandine Fredon & Benjamin Massoubre** ‡; Turning Red – Domee Shi; Ernest & Celestine – Stéphane Aubier, Vincent Patar & Benjamin Renner; The Black Pharaoh, the Savage and the Princess – Michel Ocelot; My Father's Secrets – Véra Belmont; My Afghan Family – Michaela Pavlatova; Guillermo del Toro's Pinocchio – Guillermo del Toro	**Best TV Series (or Mini-Series)**: **The White Lotus** ‡; House of the Dragon; Irma Vep; Reign Supreme; Black Butterflies; Severance; Tokyo Vice
**Honorary Award**: **Jean-Jacques Annaud**
**Lifetime Achievement Award**: **Roger Corman**

=== 2024 ===
The nominees were announced on 9 January 2024. The winners were announced on 4 February 2024.

**Best Film**: **Anatomy of a Fall – Justine Triet** ‡; Babylon – Damien Chazelle; All Your Faces – Jeanne Herry; Killers of the Flower Moon – Martin Scorsese; Oppenheimer – Christopher Nolan; Kidnapped – Marco Bellocchio; The Fabelmans – Steven Spielberg	**Best Director**: **Damien Chazelle – Babylon** ‡; Justine Triet – Anatomy of a Fall; Christopher Nolan – Oppenheimer; Steven Spielberg – The Fabelmans; Thomas Cailley – The Animal Kingdom; Marco Bellocchio – Kidnapped; Jeanne Herry – All Your Faces
**Best First Film**: **Junkyard Dog – Jean-Baptiste Durand** ‡; Aftersun – Charlotte Wells; Bernadette – Léa Domenach; How to Have Sex – Molly Manning Walker; The Rapture – Iris Kaltenback; All to Play For – Delphine Deloget; Vincent Must Die – Stéphan Castang	**Best Documentary**: **Four Daughters – Kaouther Ben Hania** ‡; La Rivière – Dominique Marchais; Little Girl Blue – Mona Achache; Our Body – Claire Simon; On the Adamant – Nicolas Philibert; All the Beauty and the Bloodshed – Laura Poitras; Antarctica Calling – Luc Jacquet
**Best Actor**: **Arieh Worthalter – The Goldman Case** ‡; Benjamin Lavernhe – Abbé Pierre – A Century of Devotion; Cillian Murphy – Oppenheimer; Koji Yakusho – Perfect Days; Paul Giamatti – The Holdovers; Raphaël Quenard – Yannick; Vincent Lacoste – Along Came Love	**Best Actress**: **Sandra Hüller – Anatomy of a Fall** ‡; Cate Blanchett – Tár; Catherine Deneuve – Bernadette; Hafsia Herzi – The Rapture; Léa Drucker – Last Summer; Lily Gladstone – Killers of the Flower Moon; Marion Cotillard – Little Girl Blue
**Best Supporting Actor**: **Brad Pitt – Babylon** ‡; Louis Garrel – The Three Musketeers: D'Artagnan; Raphaël Quenard – Junkyard Dog; Robert De Niro – Killers of the Flower Moon; Robert Downey Jr. – Oppenheimer; Romain Duris – The Animal Kingdom; Ryan Gosling – Barbie	**Best Supporting Actress**: **Adèle Exarchopoulos – All Your Faces** ‡; Emily Blunt – Oppenheimer; Blanche Gardin – The Book of Solutions; Da'Vine Joy Randolph – The Holdovers; India Hair – All to Play For; Michelle Williams – The Fabelmans; Noémie Merlant – Tár
**Best Male Revelation**: **Raphaël Quenard – Junkyard Dog** ‡; Arthur Harari – The Goldman Case; Diego Calva – Babylon; Gabriel LaBelle – The Fabelmans; Milo Machado-Graner – Anatomy of a Fall; Paul Kircher – The Animal Kingdom; Samuel Kircher – Last Summer	**Best Female Revelation**: **Ella Rumpf – Marguerite's Theorem** ‡; Carrie Crowley – The Quiet Girl; Kim Higelin – Consent; Magalie Lépine-Blondeau – The Nature of Love; Mia McKenna-Bruce – How to Have Sex; Stéphane Caillard – Flo; Suzy Bemba – Homecoming
**Best Original Screenplay**: **Anatomy of a Fall – Justine Triet & Arthur Harari** ‡; Babylon – Damien Chazelle; All Your Faces – Jeanne Herry; The Goldman Case – Cédric Kahn & Nathalie Herzberg; The Animal Kingdom – Thomas Cailley & Pauline Munier; Monster – Yuji Sakamoto; The Fabelmans – Steven Spielberg & Tony Kushner	**Best Adapted Screenplay**: **Killers of the Flower Moon – Eric Roth & Martin Scorsese** ‡; Consent – Vanessa Filho, Vanessa Springora, François Pirot; Green Tide – Pierre Jolivet, Inès Léraud; The Three Musketeers: D'Artagnan – Alexandre de La Patellière & Mathieu Delaporte; The Crime Is Mine – François Ozon; Oppenheimer – Christopher Nolan; The Son – Christopher Hampton & Florian Zeller
**Best Cinematography**: **Oppenheimer – Hoyte van Hoytema** ‡; Anatomy of a Fall – Simon Beaufils; Babylon – Linus Sandgren; Killers of the Flower Moon – Rodrigo Prieto; Tchaikovsky's Wife – Vladislav Opelyants; The Animal Kingdom – David Cailley; The Fabelmans – Janusz Kamiński	**Best Editing**: **Anatomy of a Fall – Laurent Sénéchal** ‡; Babylon – Tom Cross; Killers of the Flower Moon – Thelma Schoonmaker; The Animal Kingdom – Lilian Corbeille; The Book of Solutions – Élise Fievet; Oppenheimer – Jennifer Lame; Tár – Monika Willi
**Best Original Score**: **Babylon – Justin Hurwitz** ‡; Disco Boy – Vitalic; The Boy and the Heron – Joe Hisaishi; The Animal Kingdom – Andrea Laszlo De Simone; Chicken for Linda! – Clément Ducol; Oppenheimer – Ludwig Göransson; The Fabelmans – John Williams	**Best Production Design**: **Babylon – Florencia Martin** ‡; Barbie – Sarah Greenwood; Killers of the Flower Moon – Jack Fisk; The Three Musketeers: D'Artagnan – Stéphane Taillasson; The Crime Is Mine – Jean Rabasse; Oppenheimer – Ruth De Jong; The Fabelmans – Rick Carter
**Best Costume Design**: **The Three Musketeers: D'Artagnan – Thierry Delettre** ‡; Babylon – Mary Zophres; Barbie – Jacqueline Durran; Killers of the Flower Moon – Jacqueline West; Tchaikovsky's Wife – Dimitri Andreïev; Kidnapped – Sergio Ballo & Daria Calvelli; Napoleon – David Crossman & Janty Yates	**Best Animated Film**: **Mars Express – Jérémie Périn** ‡; No Dogs or Italians Allowed – Alain Ughetto; The Boy and the Heron – Hayao Miyazaki; Chicken for Linda! – Chiara Malta & Sébastien Laudenbach; Robot Dreams – Pablo Berger; Spider-Man: Across the Spider-Verse – Joaquim Dos Santos, Kemp Powers & Justin K. Thompson; Suzume – Makoto Shinkai
**Best TV Series (or Mini-Series)**: **Of Money and Blood – Xavier Giannoli** ‡; The Night Logan Woke Up – Xavier Dolan; Polar Park – Gérald Hustache–Mathieu; Sambre – Alice Géraud & Marc Herpou; Succession – Jesse Armstrong; Class Act – Tristan Séguéla & Olivier Demangel; Tout va bien – Camille de Castelnau
**Honorary Award**: **Vincent Lindon**
**Lifetime Achievement Award**: **Jerry Schatzberg**
**Outstanding Contribution to Cinema Award**: **Michel Ciment**
**Best Contribution to the Art of Cinema Award**: **Warner Bros.**

=== 2025 ===
**Best Film**: **Emilia Pérez – Jacques Audiard**‡; Anora – Sean Baker; The Count of Monte Cristo – **Souleymane's Story – Boris Lojkine; The Substance – Coralie Fargeat; The Zone of Interest – Jonathan Glazer	**Best Director**: **Coralie Fargeat – The Substance**‡; Jacques Audiard – Emilia Pérez; Sean Baker – Anora; Matthieu Delaporte and Alexandre de La Patellière – The Count of Monte Cristo; Gilles Lellouche – Beating Hearts; Boris Lojkine – Souleymane's Story
**Best First Film**: **Holy Cow – Louise Courvoisier**‡; Barbès, Little Algérie – Hassan Guerrar; Ghost Trail – Jonathan Millet; The Kingdom – Julien Colonna; Rabia – Mareike Engelhardt; Tatami – Zar Amir Ebrahimi and Guy Nattiv; Wild Diamond – Agathe Riedinger	**Best Documentary**: **Once Upon a Time Michel Legrand – David Hertzog Dessites**‡; The Belle from Gaza – Yolande Zauberman; Bye Bye Tiberias – Lina Soualem; Dahomey – Mati Diop; Ernest Cole: Lost and Found – Raoul Peck; Madame Hofmann – Sébastien Lifshitz
**Best Actor**: **Karim Leklou – Jim's Story**‡; Ralph Fiennes – Conclave; Pierre Lottin – The Marching Band; Pierre Niney – The Count of Monte Cristo; Sebastian Stan – The Apprentice; Sofiane Zermani – Barbès, Little Algérie	**Best Actress**: **Demi Moore – The Substance**‡; Karla Sofía Gascón – Emilia Pérez; Hafsia Herzi – Borgo; Sandrine Kiberlain – The Divine Sarah Bernhardt; Mikey Madison – Anora; Emma Stone – Poor Things
**Best Supporting Actor**: **Pierre Lottin – When Fall Is Coming**‡; Yura Borisov – Anora; Alain Chabat – Beating Hearts; Jean-Baptiste Durand – Misericordia; Laurent Lafitte – The Count of Monte Cristo; Jeremy Strong – The Apprentice	**Best Supporting Actress**: **Zoe Saldaña – Emilia Pérez**‡; Catherine Frot – Misericordia; Margaret Qualley – The Substance; Isabella Rossellini – Conclave; Anamaria Vartolomei – The Count of Monte Cristo; Mallory Wanecque – Beating Hearts
**Best Male Revelation**: **Abou Sangaré – Souleymane's Story**‡; Adam Bessa – Ghost Trail; Sayyid El Alami – And Their Children After Them; Clément Faveau – Holy Cow; Malik Frikah – Beating Hearts; Félix Kysyl – Misericordia	**Best Female Revelation**: **Mallory Wanecque – Beating Hearts**‡; Maïwène Barthelemy – Holy Cow; Ghjuvanna Benedetti – The Kingdom; Malou Khebizi – Wild Diamond; Megan Northam – Rabia; Cailee Spaeny – Priscilla
**Best Original Screenplay**: **The Seed of the Sacred Fig – Mohammad Rasoulof**‡; Anora – Sean Baker; Borgo – Stéphane Demoustier; Ghost Trail – Jonathan Millet and Florence Rochat; The Marching Band – Emmanuel Courcol and Irène Muscari; Souleymane's Story – Boris Lojkine and Delphine Agut; The Substance – Coralie Fargeat	**Best Adapted Screenplay**: **The Most Precious of Cargoes – Michel Hazanavicius and Jean-Claude Grumberg**‡; Conclave – Peter Straughan; The Count of Monte Cristo – Matthieu Delaporte and Alexandre de La Patellière; Emilia Pérez – Jacques Audiard, Thomas Bidegain, Léa Mysius, and Nicolas Livecchi; Jim's Story – Arnaud and Jean-Marie Larrieu; Misericordia – Alain Guiraudie; The Zone of Interest – Jonathan Glazer
**Best Cinematography**: **Dune: Part Two – Greig Fraser** ‡; The Count of Monte Cristo – Nicolas Bolduc; Emilia Pérez – Paul Guilhaume; Souleymane's Story – Tristan Galand; The Substance – Benjamin Kračun; The Zone of Interest – Łukasz Żal	**Best Editing**: **Emilia Pérez – Juliette Welfling** ‡; The Apprentice – Olivier Bugge Coutté and Olivia Neergaard-Holm; Beating Hearts – Simon Jacquet; The Count of Monte Cristo – Célia Lafitedupont; Poor Things – Yorgos Mavropsaridis; The Zone of Interest – Paul Watts
**Best Original Score**: **Emilia Pérez – Camille and Clément Ducol** ‡; Beating Hearts – Jon Brion; Challengers – Trent Reznor and Atticus Ross; The Count of Monte Cristo – Jérôme Rebotier; Dune: Part Two – Hans Zimmer; The Most Precious of Cargoes – Alexandre Desplat	**Best Production Design**: **The Count of Monte Cristo – Stéphane Taillasson** ‡; Conclave – Suzie Davies; The Divine Sarah Bernhardt – Olivier Radot; Emilia Pérez – Emmanuelle Duplay; Poor Things – James Price; The Substance – Stanislas Reydellet
**Best Costume Design**: **The Count of Monte Cristo – Thierry Delettre**‡; The Divine Sarah Bernhardt – Anaïs Romand; Dune: Part Two – Jacqueline West; Emilia Pérez – Virginie Montel; Nosferatu – Linda Muir; Poor Things – Holly Waddington	**Best Animated Film**: **Flow – Gints Zilbalodis** ‡; Inside Out 2 – Kelsey Mann; The Most Precious of Cargoes – Michel Hazanavicius; Savages – Claude Barras; Silex and the City – Jul and Jean-Paul Guigue; The Wild Robot – Chris Sanders
**Best TV Series (or Mini-Series)**: **La Fièvre – Éric Benzekri (Canal+)**‡; Baby Reindeer – Richard Gadd (Netflix); DJ Mehdi: Made in France – Thibaut de Longeville (Arte); Hippocrate – Thomas Lilti (Canal+); Severance – Dan Erickson (Apple TV+); Zorro – Benjamin Charbit and Noé Debré (Paramount+ / France Télévisions)
**Honorary Award**: **Victoria Abril**
**Outstanding Contribution to Cinema Award**: **Gilles Jacob**
**Best Contribution to the Art of Cinema Award**: **Cinémathèque française** for the restoration of Napoléon by Abel Gance

=== 2026 ===
The nominees were announced on 10 January 2026. The winners were announced on 8 February 2026.

**Best Film**: **One Battle After Another – Paul Thomas Anderson**‡; Case 137 – Dominik Moll; The Secret Agent – Kleber Mendonça Filho; The Secret Agent – Hafsia Herzi; The Ties That Bind Us – Carine Tardieu; Sirât – Oliver Laxe; It Was Just an Accident – Jafar Panahi	**Best Director**: **Paul Thomas Anderson – One Battle After Another**‡; Brady Corbet – The Brutalist; Hafsia Herzi – The Little Sister; Joachim Trier – Sentimental Value; Kleber Mendonça Filho – The Secret Agent; Oliver Laxe – Sirât
**Best First Film**: **Nino – Pauline Loquès**‡; Cassandre – Hélène Merlin; Block Pass – Antoine Chevrollier; L'Épreuve du feu – Aurélien Peyre; Partir un jour – Amélie Bonnin; Qui brille au combat – Joséphine Japy; Sorry, Baby – Eva Victor; The Chronology of Water – Kristen Stewart	**Lifetime Achievement Award**: **Claudia Cardinale**
**Outstanding Contribution to Cinema Award**: **Alain Terzian**
**Best Contribution to the Art of Cinema Award**: **Le Grand Rex - Paris**

=== Categories ===
- Best Animated Film
- Best Film
- Best First Film
- Best Director
- Best Documentary
- Best Cinematography
- Best Editing
- Best Original Screenplay
- Best Adapted Screenplay
- Best Actor
- Best Actress
- Best Supporting Actor
- Best Supporting Actress
- Best Male Revelation
- Best Female Revelation
- Best Original Score
- Best Production Design
- Best Costume Design
- Best TV Series (or Mini-Series)
- Lifetime Achievement Award
- Honorary Award
- Outstanding Contribution to Cinema
- Best Contribution to the Art of Cinema
