= 50th César Awards =

Awards ceremony

- Official poster designed by Christophe Blain
- Date: 28 February 2025
- Site: Olympia, Paris
- Hosted by: Jean-Pascal Zadi

Highlights
- Best Film: Emilia Pérez
- Best Actor: Karim Leklou; Jim's Story
- Best Actress: Hafsia Herzi; Borgo
- Most awards: Emilia Pérez (7)
- Most nominations: The Count of Monte Cristo (14)

Television coverage
- Network: Canal+

The 50th César Awards ceremony, presented by the Académie des Arts et Techniques du Cinéma, was held on 28 February 2025 at the Olympia in Paris, honouring the best French films of 2024. Actress Catherine Deneuve presided over the ceremony for the second time, having previously hosted the 8th ceremony in 1983. It was hosted by Jean-Pascal Zadi, who was accompanied by Emmanuelle Béart, Alice Belaïdi, Cécile de France, Hafsia Herzi, Bouli Lanners, William Lebghil, Vincent Macaigne, Pio Marmaï, Vimala Pons, Raphaël Quenard, Ludivine Sagnier and Justine Triet. The ceremony, televised in France by Canal+, was directed by Cédric Klapisch.

American actress Julia Roberts and Greek-French filmmaker Costa-Gavras received the Honorary César. The nominations were announced on 29 January 2025. The Count of Monte Cristo led with 14 nominations, followed by Beating Hearts and Emilia Pérez with 13 and 12, respectively.

Emilia Pérez went on to win seven awards, more than any other film in the ceremony, including Best Film. Hafsia Herzi became the first non-white actress to win Best Actress for Borgo.

== Winners and nominees ==
Nominations were announced on 29 January 2025.

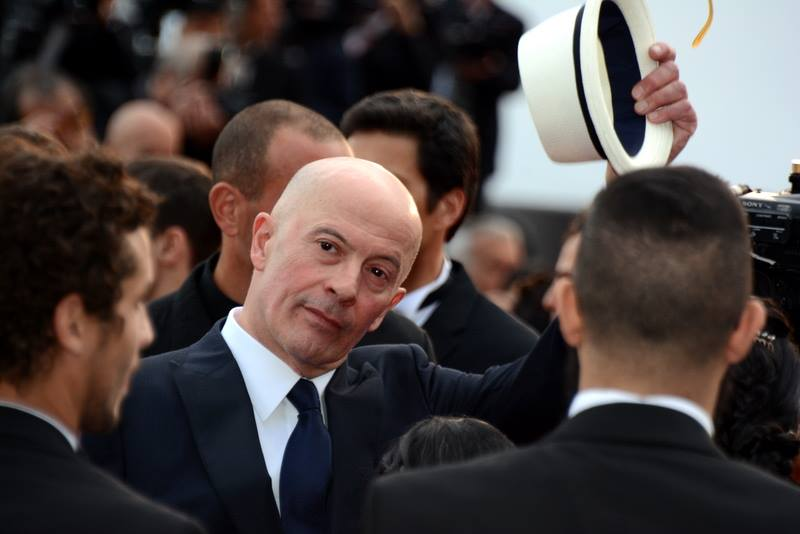
Jacques Audiard, Best Film, Best Director and Best Adaptation winner.

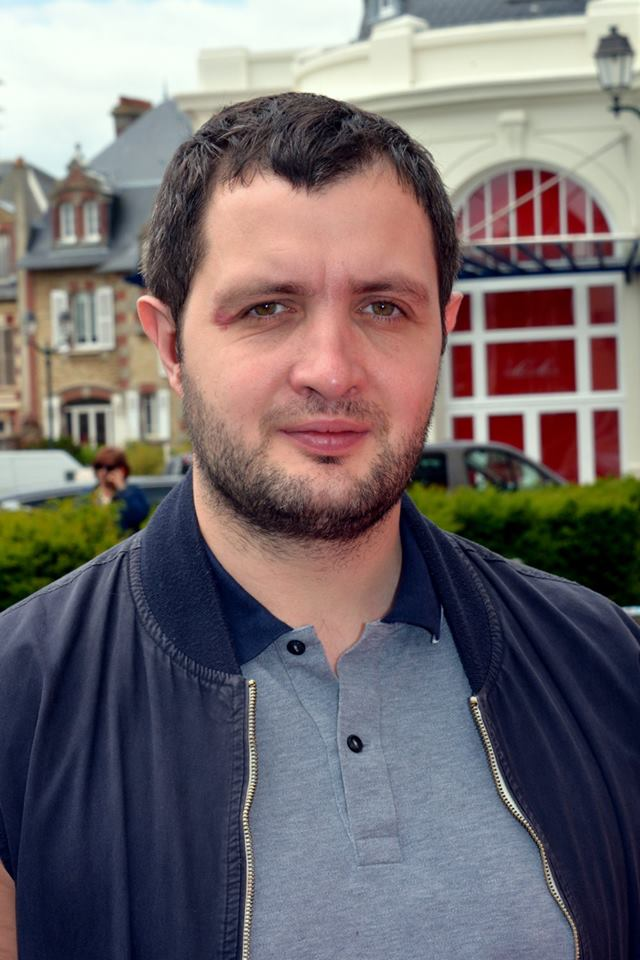
Karim Leklou, Best Actor winner.

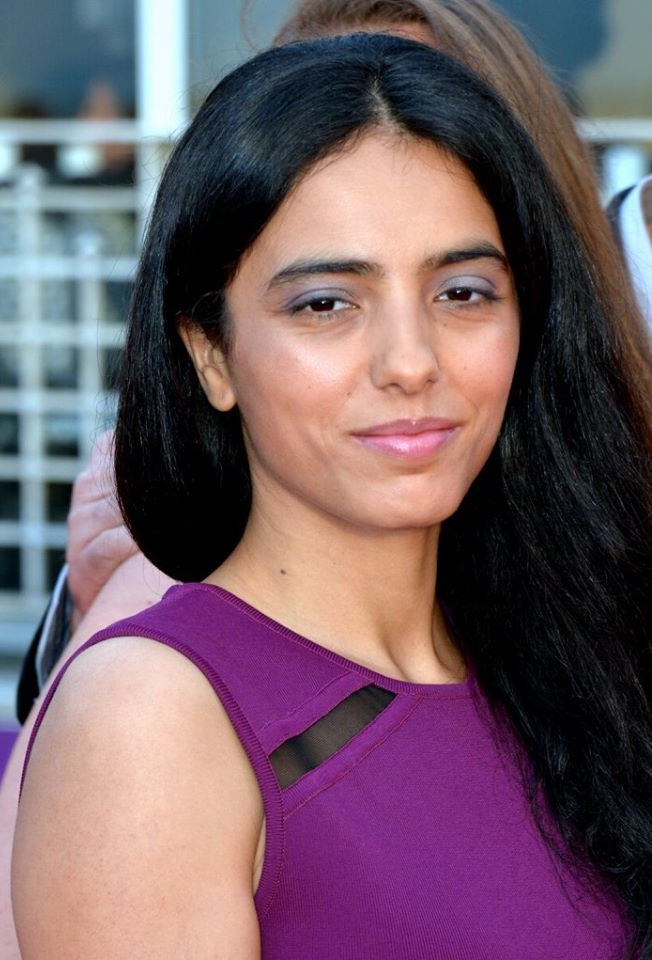
Hafsia Herzi, Best Actress winner.

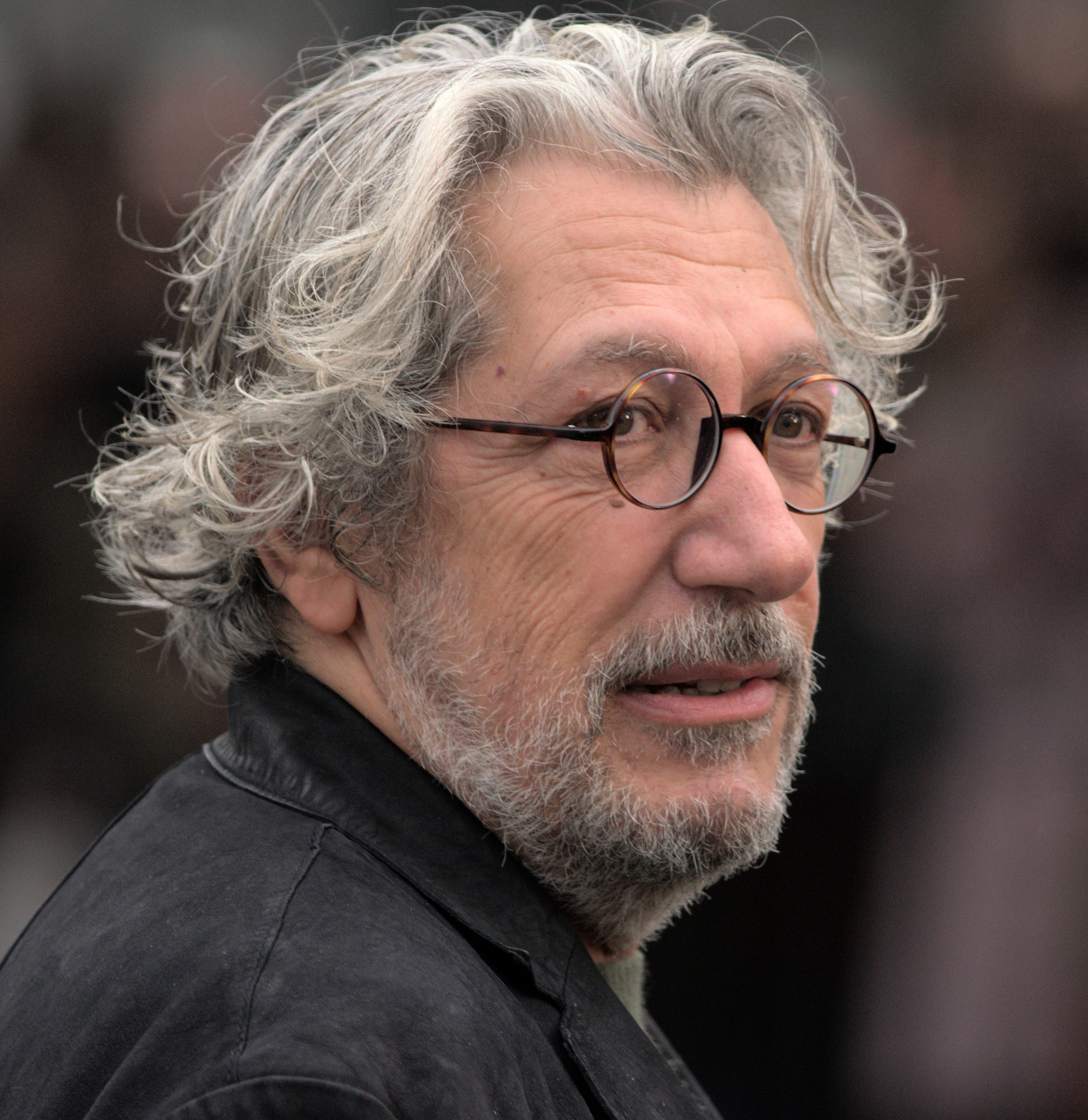
Alain Chabat, Best Supporting Actor winner.

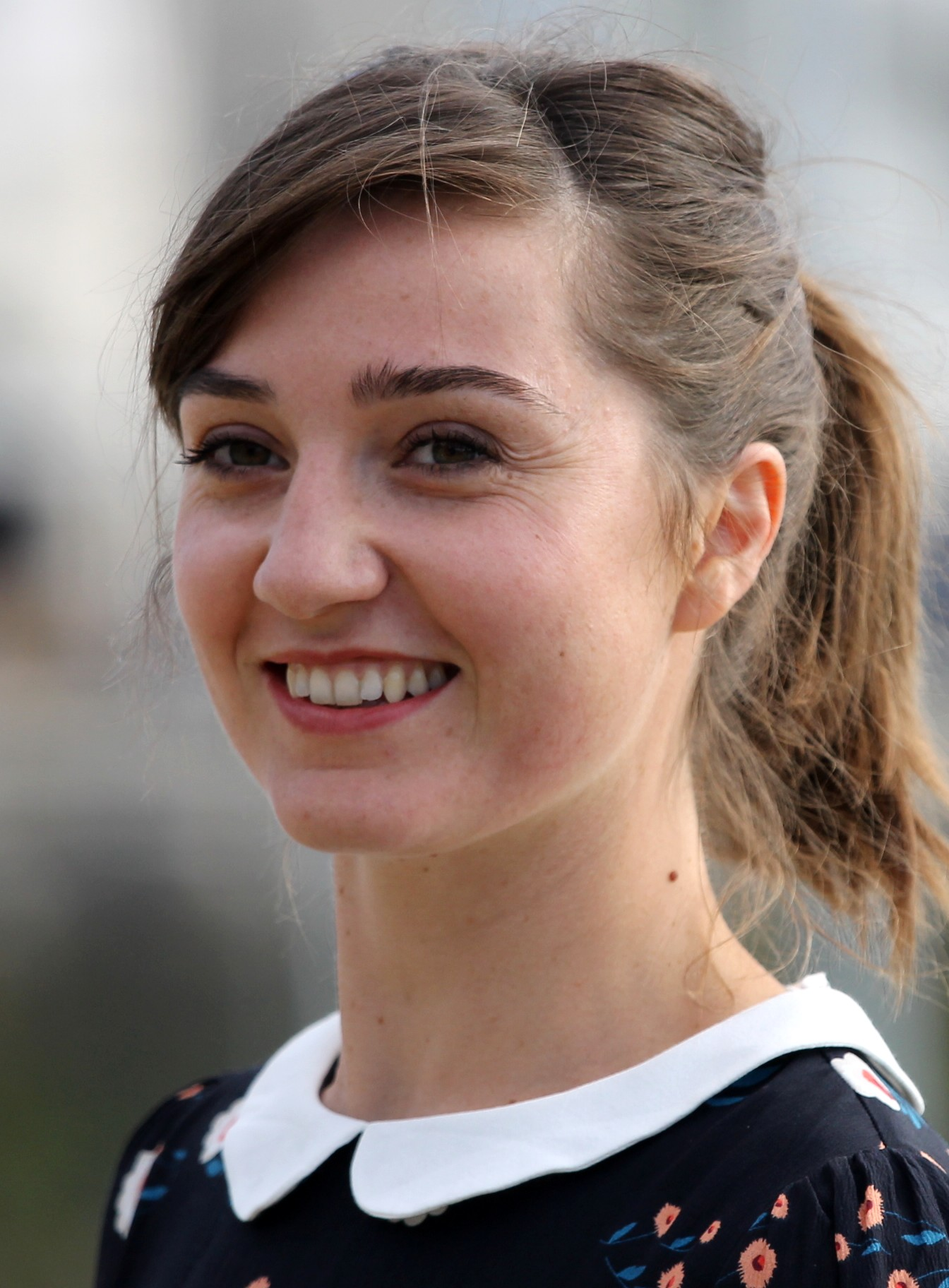
Nina Meurisse, Best Supporting Actress winner.

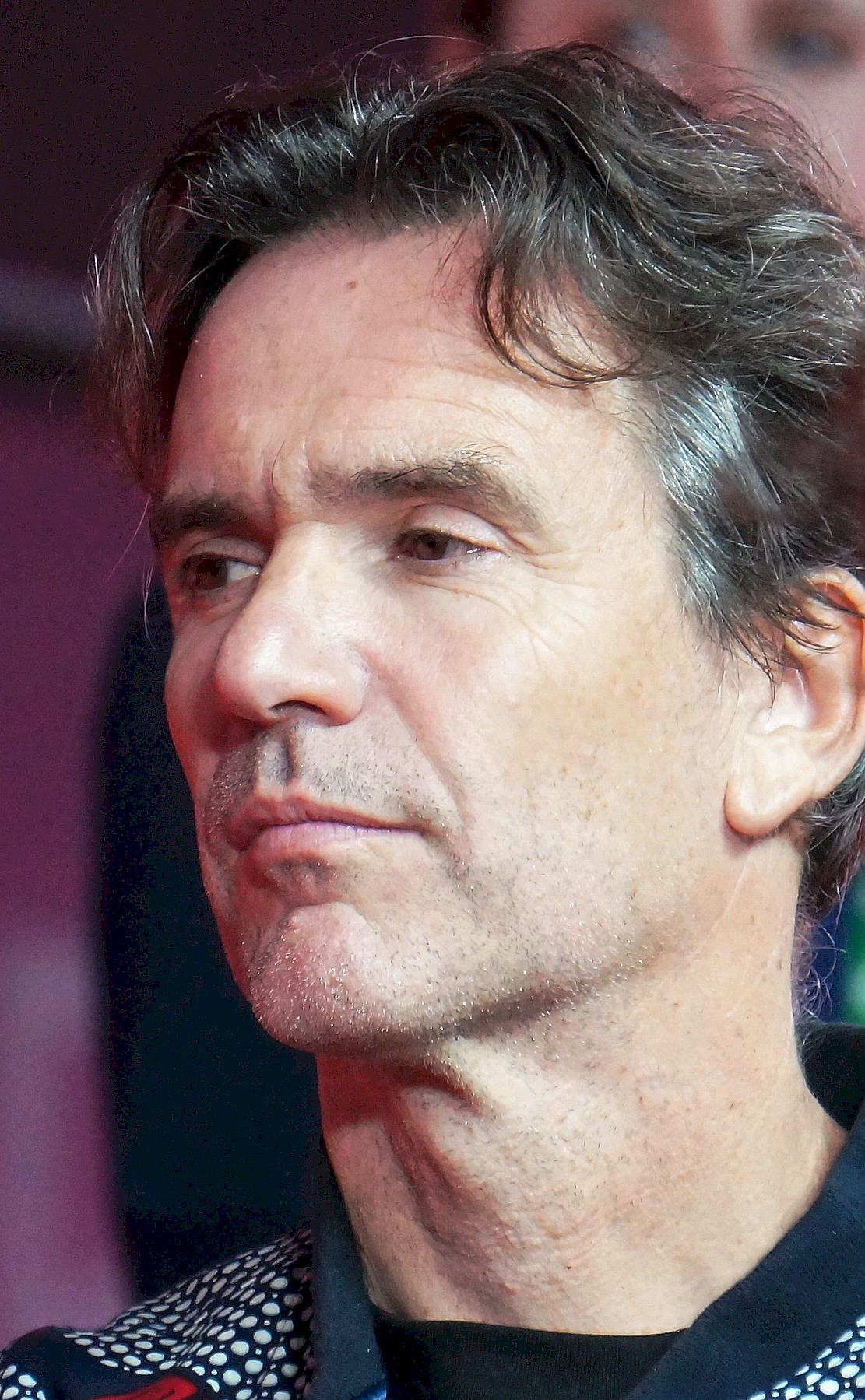
Boris Lojkine, Best Original Screenplay winner.

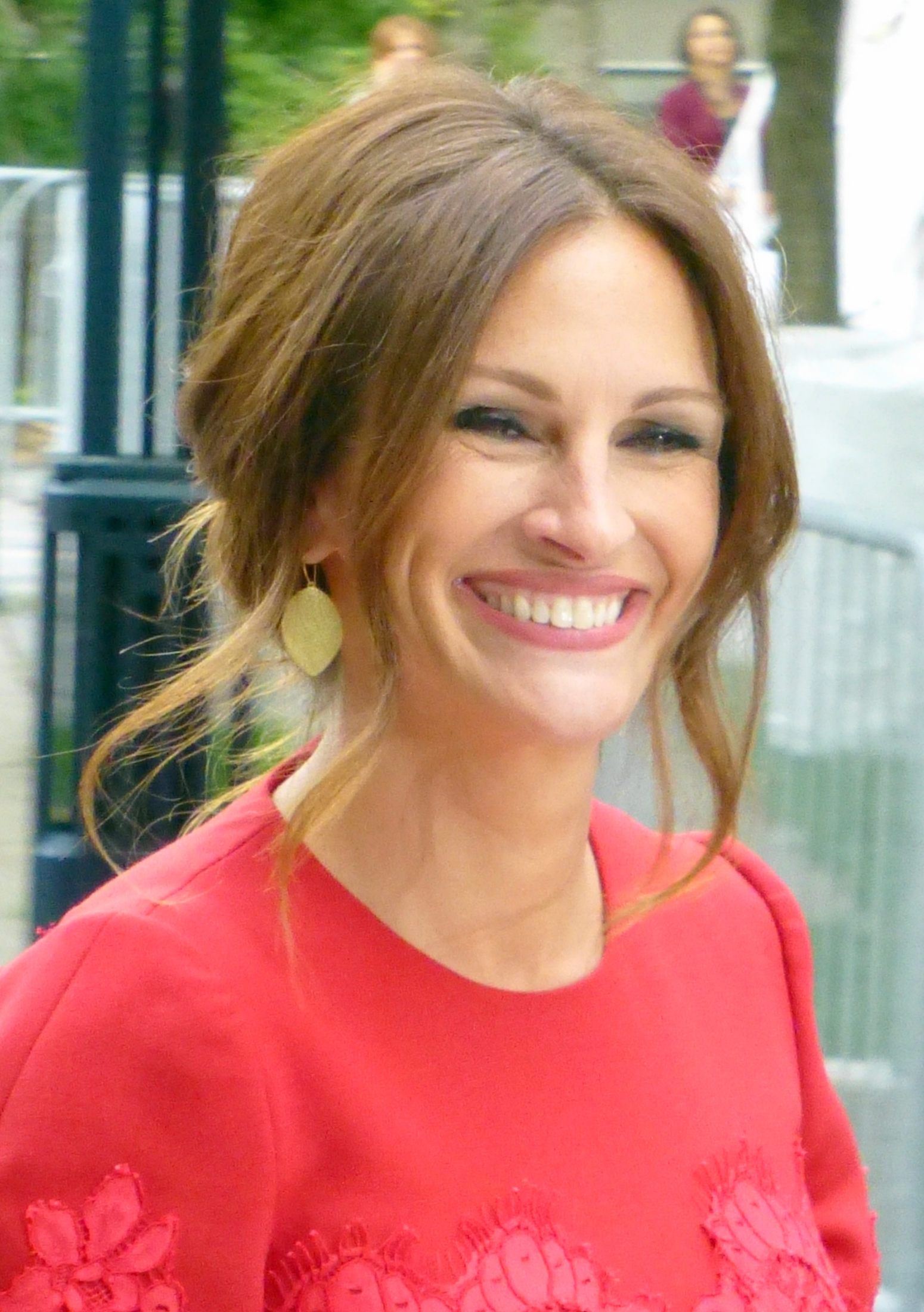
Julia Roberts, Honorary César recipient.

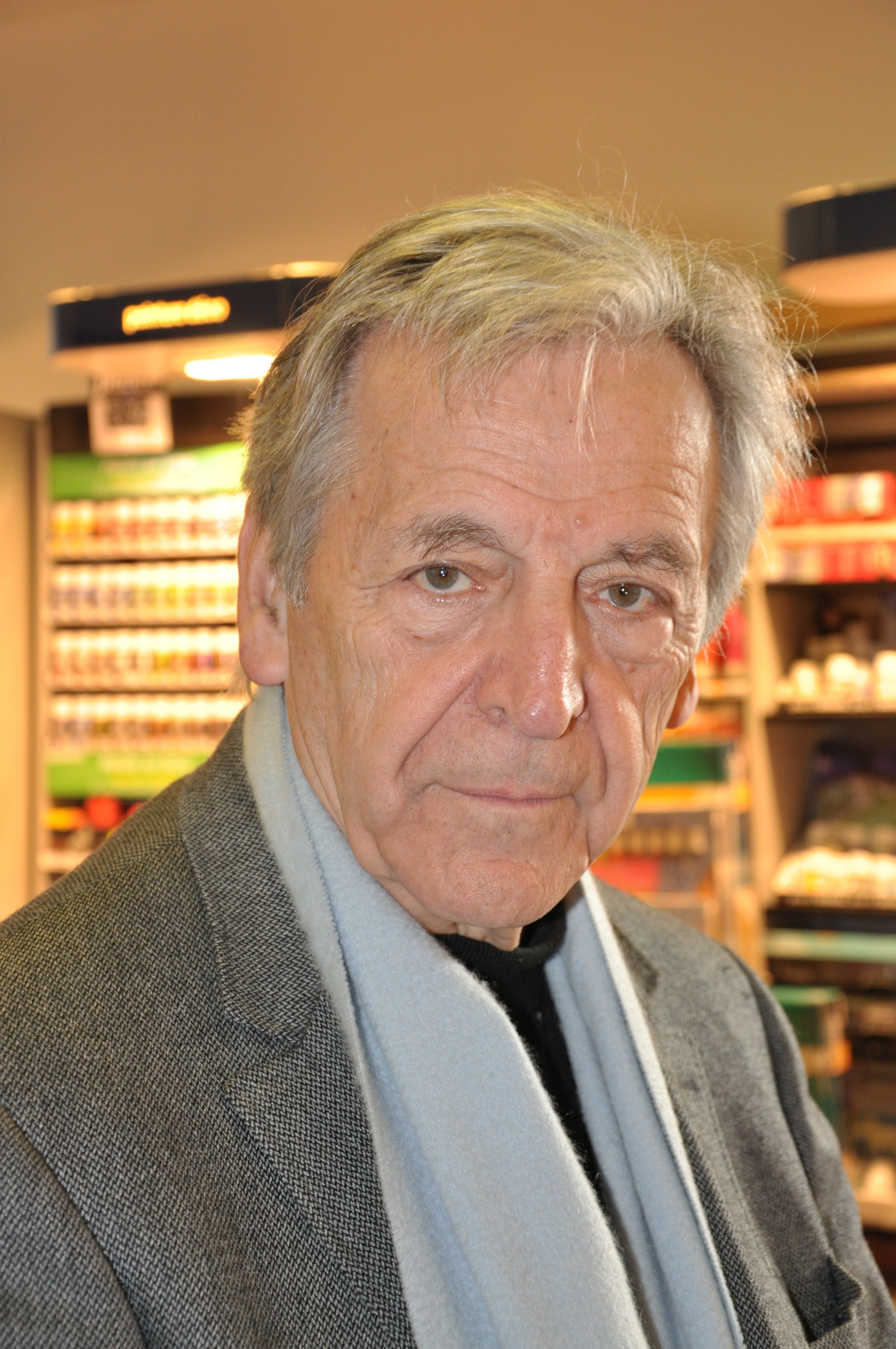
Costa-Gavras, Honorary César recipient.

Best Film: Emilia Pérez – produced by Jacques Audiard, Pascal Caucheteux, Valérie Schermann and Anthony Vaccarello; directed by Jacques Audiard; The Count of Monte Cristo – produced by Dimitri Rassam; directed by Matthieu Delaporte and Alexandre de La Patellière; The Marching Band – produced by Marc Bordure and Robert Guédiguian; directed by Emmanuel Courcol; Souleymane's Story – produced by Bruno Nahon; directed by Boris Lojkine; Misericordia – produced by Charles Gillibert; directed by Alain Guiraudie	Best Director: Jacques Audiard – Emilia Pérez; Gilles Lellouche – Beating Hearts; Matthieu Delaporte and Alexandre de La Patellière – The Count of Monte Cristo; Boris Lojkine – Souleymane's Story; Alain Guiraudie – Misericordia
Best Actor: Karim Leklou – Jim's Story as Aymeric; François Civil – Beating Hearts as Clotaire; Benjamin Lavernhe – The Marching Band as Thibaut Desormeaux; Pierre Niney – The Count of Monte Cristo as Edmond Dantès / Lord Halifax / Abbé Busoni; Tahar Rahim – Monsieur Aznavour as Charles Aznavour	Best Actress: Hafsia Herzi – Borgo as Mélissa Dahleb; Adèle Exarchopoulos – Beating Hearts as Jackie; Karla Sofía Gascón – Emilia Pérez as Emilia Pérez / Juan "Manitas" Del Monte; Zoe Saldaña – Emilia Pérez as Rita Mora Castro; Hélène Vincent – When Fall Is Coming as Michelle Giraud
Best Supporting Actor: Alain Chabat – Beating Hearts as Jackie's father; David Ayala – Misericordia as Walter Bonchamp; Bastien Bouillon – The Count of Monte Cristo as Fernand de Morcerf; Jacques Develay – Misericordia as Abbé Philippe Griseul; Laurent Lafitte – The Count of Monte Cristo as Gérard de Villefort	Best Supporting Actress: Nina Meurisse – Souleymane's Story as OFPRA agent; Élodie Bouchez – Beating Hearts as Clotaire's mother; Anaïs Demoustier – The Count of Monte Cristo as Mercédès Herrera; Catherine Frot – Misericordia as Martine Rigal; Sarah Suco – The Marching Band as Sabrina
Best Male Revelation: Abou Sangaré – Souleymane's Story as Souleymane; Adam Bessa – Ghost Trail as Hamid; Malik Frikah – Beating Hearts as Clotaire (17 years old); Félix Kysyl – Misericordia as Jérémie Pastor; Pierre Lottin – The Marching Band as Jimmy Lecocq	Best Female Revelation: Maïwene Barthelemy – Holy Cow as Marie-Lise; Malou Khebizi – Wild Diamond as Liane; Megan Northam – Rabia as Jessica / Rabia; Mallory Wanecque – Beating Hearts as Jackie (15 years old); Souheila Yacoub – Planet B as Nour Hamdi
Best Original Screenplay: Souleymane's Story – Boris Lojkine and Delphine Agut; Borgo – Stéphane Demoustier; Holy Cow – Louise Courvoisier and Théo Abadie; The Marching Band – Emmanuel Courcol and Irène Muscari; Misericordia – Alain Guiraudie	Best Adaptation: Emilia Pérez – Jacques Audiard with Thomas Bidegain, Léa Mysius and Nicolas Livecchi; based on the opera libretto by Audiard and the novel Écoute by Boris Razon; The Count of Monte Cristo – Matthieu Delaporte and Alexandre de La Patellière; based on The Count of Monte Cristo by Alexandre Dumas; The Most Precious of Cargoes – Michel Hazanavicius and Jean-Claude Grumberg; based on The Most Precious of Cargoes by Jean-Claude Grumberg
Best First Film: Holy Cow – produced by Muriel Meynard; directed by Louise Courvoisier; Ghost Trail – produced by Pauline Seigland; directed by Jonathan Millet; The Kingdom – produced by Hugo Sélignac and Antoine Lafon; directed by Julien Colonna; A Little Something Extra – produced by Pierre Forette and Thierry Wong; directed by Artus; Wild Diamond – produced by Priscilla Bertin and Judith Nora; directed by Agathe Riedinger	Best Cinematography: Emilia Pérez – Paul Guilhaume; Beating Hearts – Laurent Tangy; The Count of Monte Cristo – Nicolas Bolduc; Misericordia – Claire Mathon; Souleymane's Story – Tristan Galand
Best Editing: Souleymane's Story – Xavier Sirven; Beating Hearts – Simon Jacquet; The Count of Monte Cristo – Célia Lafitedupont; Emilia Pérez – Juliette Welfling; The Marching Band – Guerric Catala	Best Sound: Emilia Pérez – Erwan Kerzanet, Aymeric Devoldère, Cyril Holtz and Niels Barletta; Beating Hearts – Cédric Deloche, Gwennolé Le Borgne, Jon Goc and Marc Doisne; The Count of Monte Cristo – David Rit, Gwennolé Le Borgne, Olivier Touche, Laure-Anne Darras, Marion Papinot, Marc Doisne and Samuel Delorme; The Marching Band – Pascal Armant, Sandy Notarianni and Niels Barletta; Souleymane's Story – Marc-Olivier Brullé, Pierre Bariaud, Charlotte Butrak and Samuel Aïchoun
Best Original Music: Emilia Pérez – Clément Ducol and Camille; Beating Hearts – Jon Brion; The Count of Monte Cristo – Jérôme Rebotier; Holy Cow – Linda Courvoisier and Charlie Courvoisier; The Most Precious of Cargoes – Alexandre Desplat	Best Costume Design: The Count of Monte Cristo – Thierry Delettre; Beating Hearts – Isabelle Pannetier; The Divine Sarah Bernhardt – Anaïs Romand; Emilia Pérez – Virginie Montel; Monsieur Aznavour – Isabelle Mathieu
Best Production Design: The Count of Monte Cristo – Stéphane Taillasson; Beating Hearts – Jean-Philippe Moreaux; The Divine Sarah Bernhardt – Olivier Radot; Emilia Pérez – Emmanuelle Duplay; Monsieur Aznavour – Stéphane Rozenbaum	Best Documentary Film: The Bertrand's Farm – produced by Denis Carot and Ulysse Payet; directed by Gilles Perret; The Belle from Gaza – produced by Bruno Nahon and Yolande Zauberman; directed by Yolande Zauberman; Bye Bye Tiberias – produced by Jean-Marie Nizan; directed by Lina Soualem; Dahomey – produced by Mati Diop, Eve Robin and Judith Lou Lévy; directed by Mati Diop; Ernest Cole: Lost and Found – produced by Raoul Peck and Tamara Rosenberg; directed by Raoul Peck; Madame Hofmann – produced by Muriel Meynard; directed by Sébastien Lifshitz
Best Animated Feature Film: Flow – produced by Matīss Kaža, Gints Zilbalodis, Ron Dyens and Gregory Zalcman; directed by Gints Zilbalodis; The Most Precious of Cargoes – produced by Patrick Sobelman, Florence Gastaud and Michel Hazanavicius; directed by Michel Hazanavicius; Savages – produced by Laurence Petit, Barbara Letellier and Carole Scotta; directed by Claude Barras	Best Animated Short Film: Yuck! – produced by Juliette Marquet and Manon Messiant; directed by Loïc Espuche; Butterfly (Papillon) – produced by Ron Dyens and Luc Camilli; directed by Florence Miailhe; Gigi – produced by Luc Camilli; directed by Cynthia Calvi
Best Fiction Short Film: The Man Who Could Not Remain Silent – produced by Noëlle Levenez; directed by Nebojša Slijepčević; Boucan – produced by Jean-Étienne Brat and Lou Chicoteau; directed by Salomé Da Souza; Ce qui appartient à César – produced by Jules Reinartz; directed by Violette Gitton; Queen Size – produced by Bastien Daret, Arthur Goisset, Robin Robles and Christophe Audeguis; directed by Avril Besson	Best Documentary Short Film: Les Fiancées du Sud – produced by Sylvie Pialat and Alejandro Arenas Azorín; directed by Elena López Riera; Little Spartacus – produced by Anne Luthaud; directed by Sara Ganem; A Lost Heart and Other Dreams of Beirut – produced by Anne-Catherine Wit; directed by Maya Abdul-Malak
Best Foreign Film: The Zone of Interest (United Kingdom / Poland / United States) – directed by Jonathan Glazer; Anora (United States) – directed by Sean Baker; The Seed of the Sacred Fig (Iran / Germany / France) – directed by Mohammad Rasoulof; The Apprentice (Canada / Denmark / Ireland / United States) – directed by Ali Abbasi; The Substance (France / United Kingdom / United States) – directed by Coralie Fargeat	Best Visual Effects: Emilia Pérez – Cédric Fayolle; The Beast – Cédric Fayolle, Hugues Namur and Émilien Lazaron; The Count of Monte Cristo – Olivier Cauwet; Monsieur Aznavour – Stéphane Dittoo
Honorary César: Julia Roberts; Costa-Gavras

=== Films with multiple nominations ===
The following films received multiple nominations:

Nominations	Films
14	The Count of Monte Cristo
13	Beating Hearts
12	Emilia Pérez
8	Misericordia
8	Souleymane's Story
7	The Marching Band
4	Holy Cow
4	Monsieur Aznavour
3	The Most Precious of Cargoes
2	Borgo
2	The Divine Sarah Bernhardt
2	Ghost Trail
2	Wild Diamond

=== Films with multiple wins ===
The following films received multiple wins:

Wins	Films
7	Emilia Pérez
4	Souleymane's Story
2	The Count of Monte Cristo
2	Holy Cow

== See also ==
- 97th Academy Awards
- 78th British Academy Film Awards
- 70th David di Donatello
- 37th European Film Awards
- 82nd Golden Globe Awards
- 39th Goya Awards
- 30th Lumière Awards
- 14th Magritte Awards
