= 30th Lumière Awards =

2025 French film awards ceremony

- Date: 20 January 2025
- Site: Forum des images, Paris
- Hosted by: Pierre Zeni; Eve Jackson

Highlights
- Best Film: Emilia Pérez
- Best Actor: Abou Sangaré; Souleymane's Story
- Best Actress: Karla Sofía Gascón; Emilia Pérez
- Most awards: Emilia Pérez (5)
- Most nominations: Emilia Pérez (6)

The 30th Lumière Awards ceremony, presented by the Académie des Lumières, took place on 20 January 2025 to honour the best in French-speaking cinema of 2024.

The nominations were announced on 12 December 2024. Emilia Pérez led the nominations with six, followed by Misericordia and Souleymane's Story with five. Emilia Pérez won the most awards with five, including Best Film.

== Winners and nominees ==
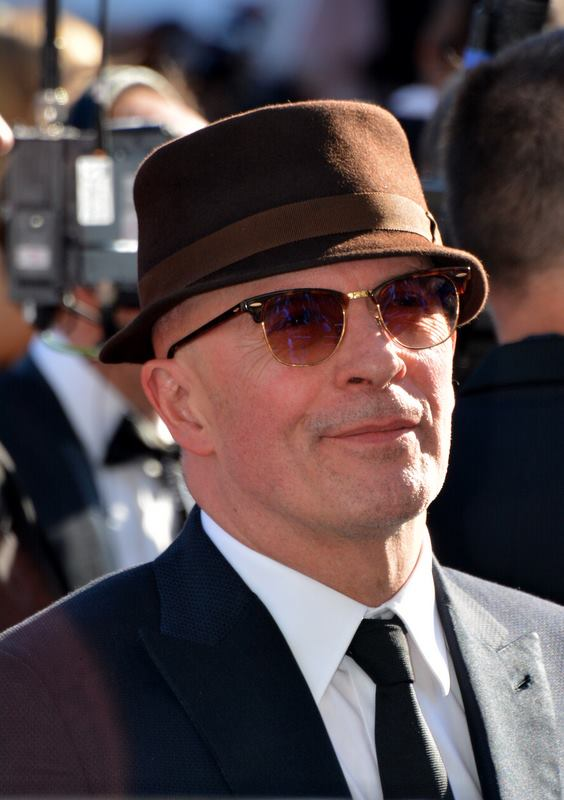
Jacques Audiard, Best Director and Best Screenplay winner

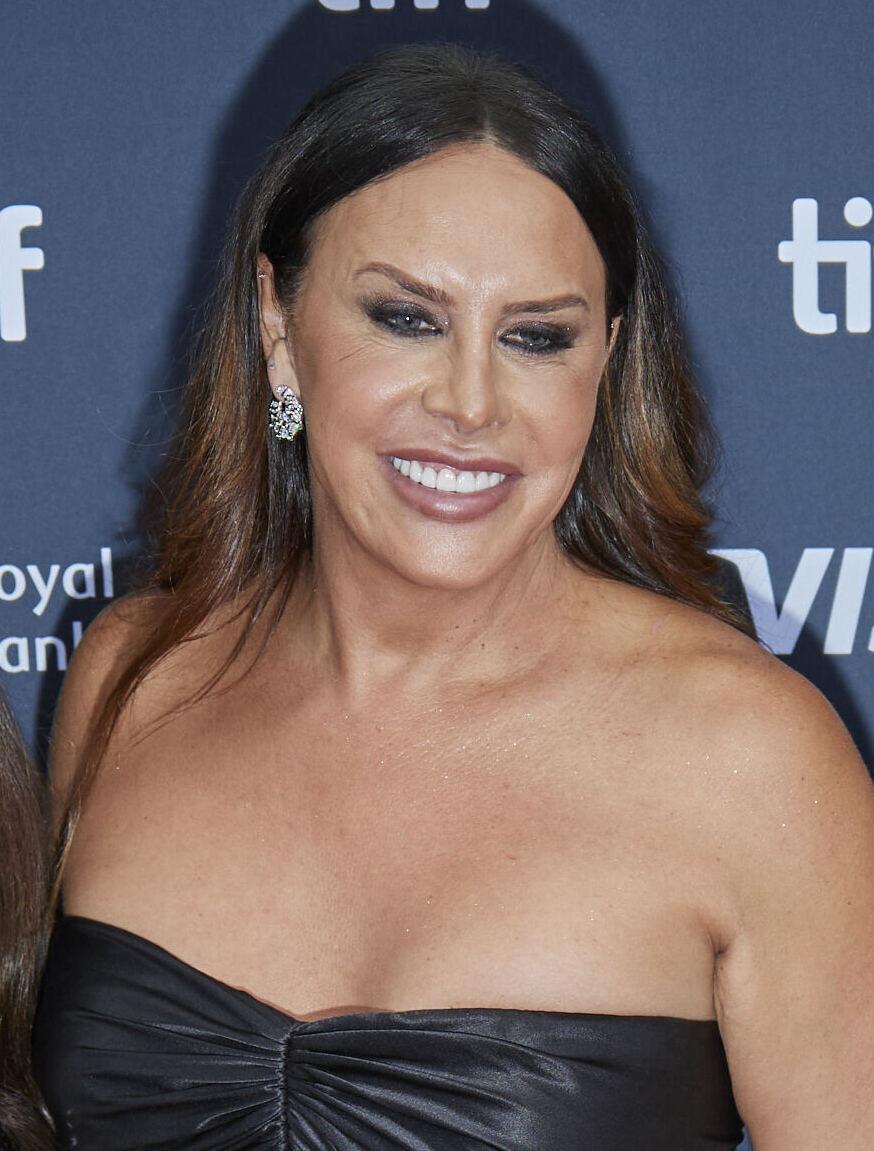
Karla Sofía Gascón, Best Actress winner

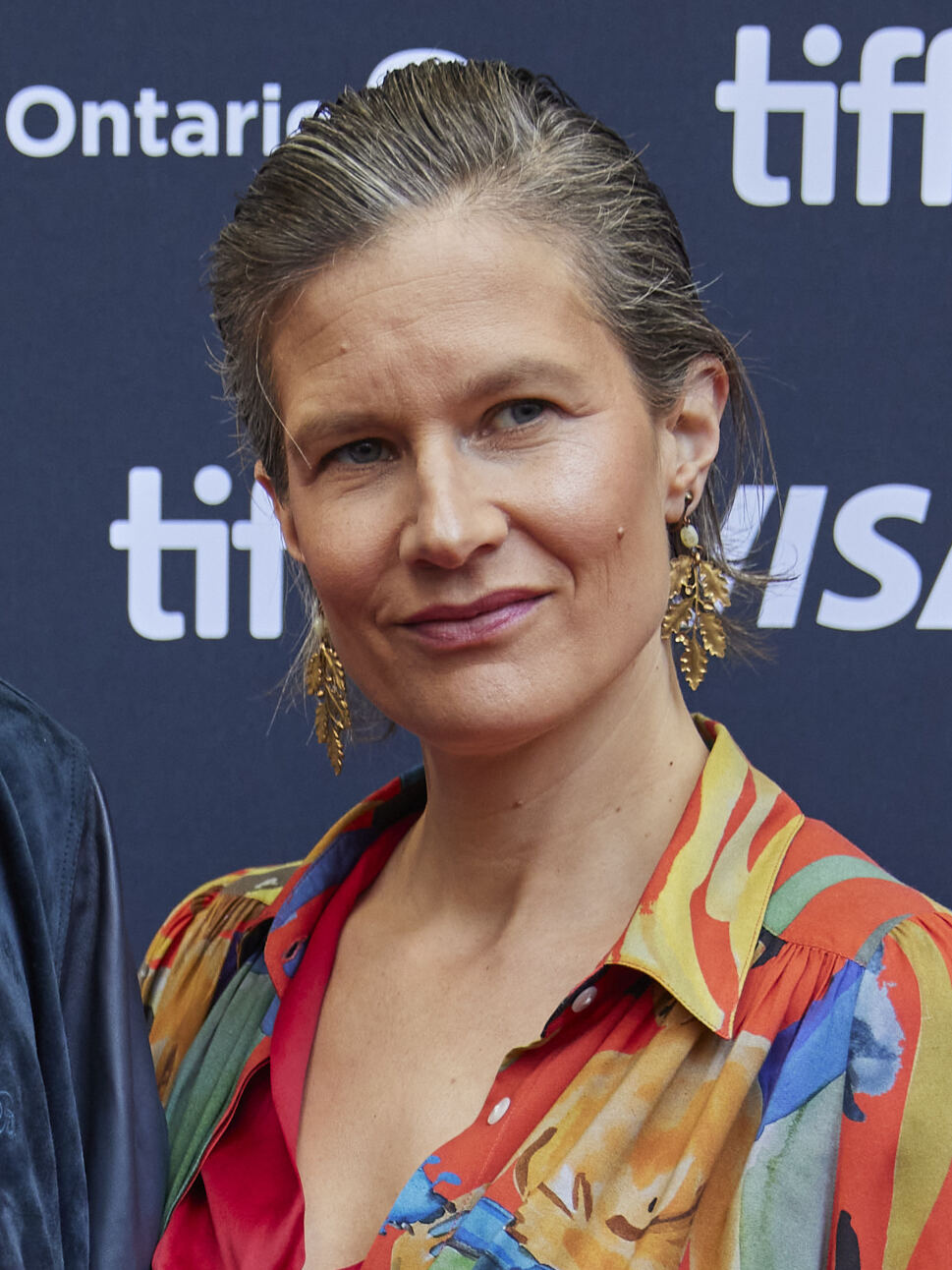
Camille, Best Music co-winner

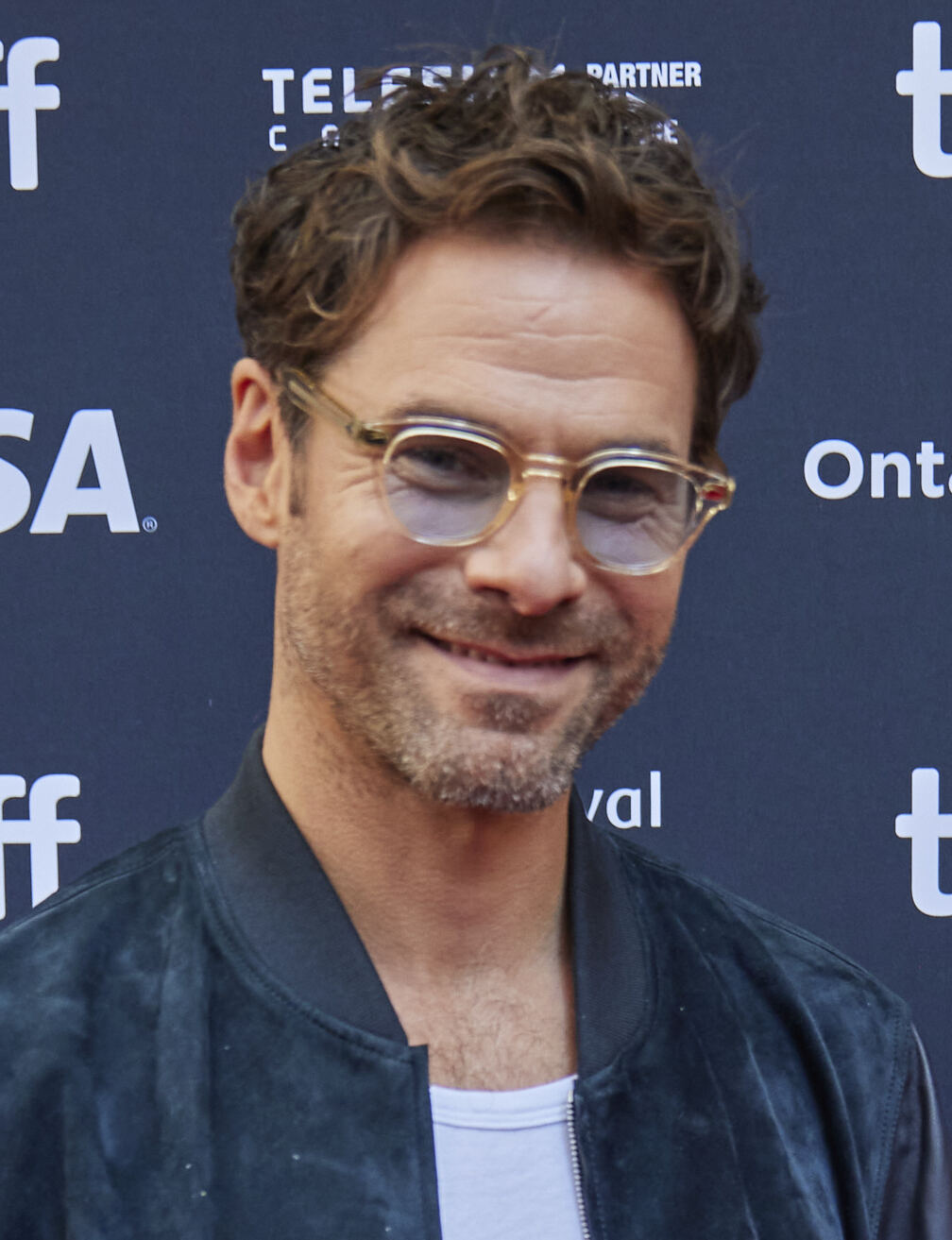
Clément Ducol, Best Music co-winner

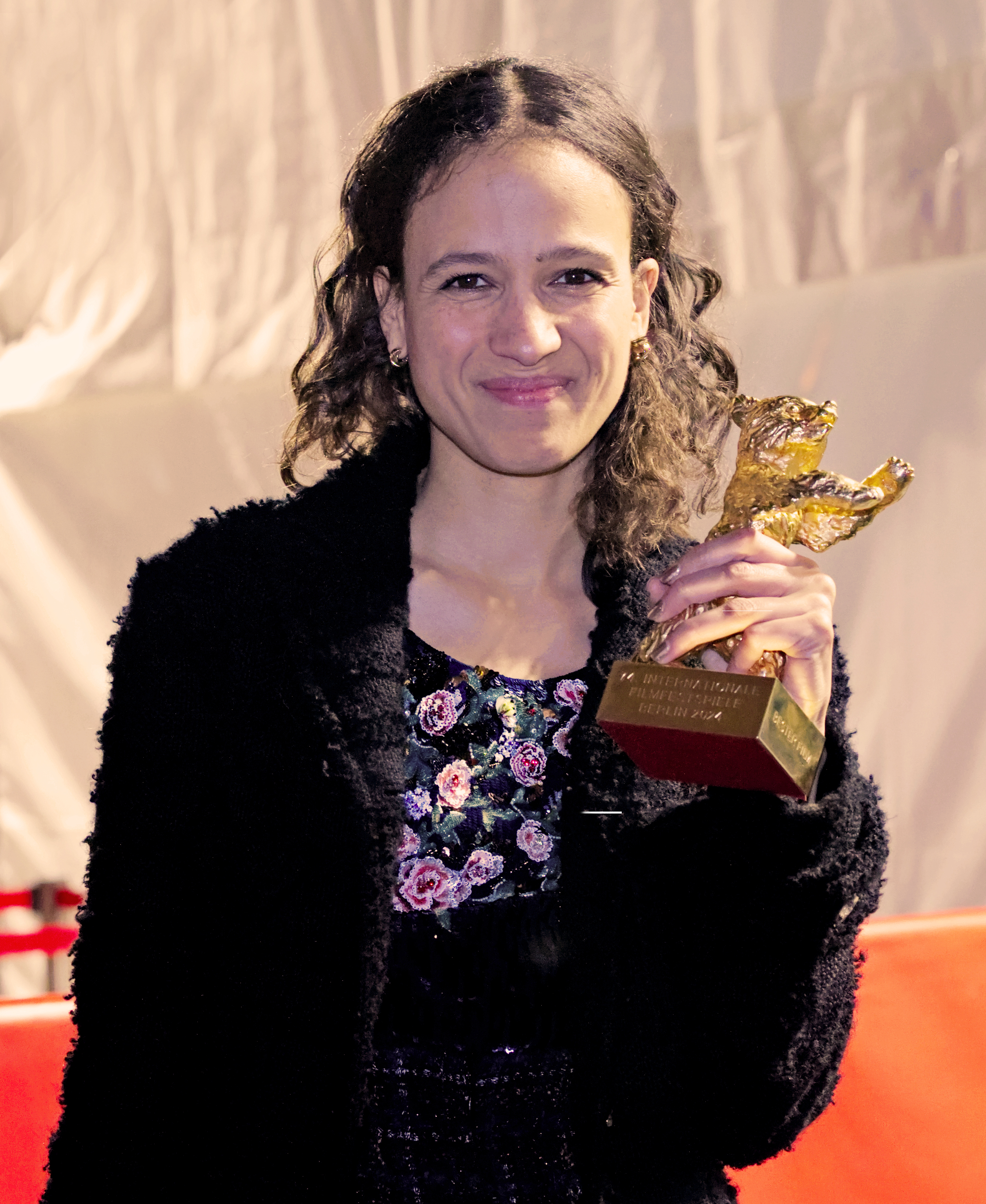
Mati Diop, Best Documentary winner

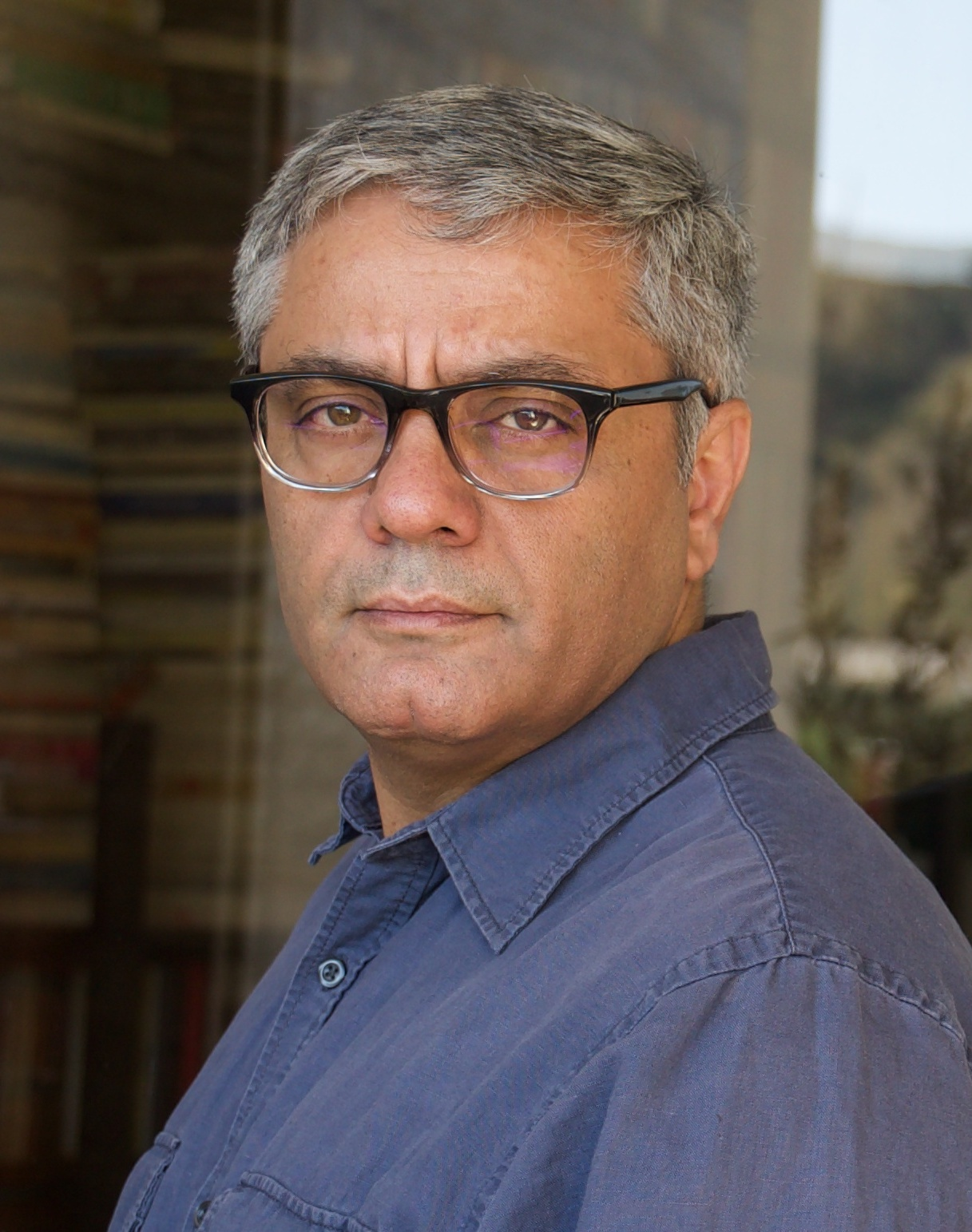
Mohammad Rasoulof, Best International Co-Production winner

The nominations were announced on 12 December 2024. Winners are listed first, highlighted in boldface, and indicated with a double dagger (‡).

| **Best Film**: **Emilia Pérez – Directed by Jacques Audiard**‡; All We Imagine as Light – Directed by Payal Kapadia; Jim's Story – Directed by Arnaud Larrieu and Jean-Marie Larrieu; Misericordia – Directed by Alain Guiraudie; Souleymane's Story – Directed by Boris Lojkine | **Best Director**: **Jacques Audiard – Emilia Pérez**‡; Matthieu Delaporte and Alexandre de La Patellière – The Count of Monte Cristo; Alain Guiraudie – Misericordia; Boris Lojkine – Souleymane's Story; François Ozon – When Fall Is Coming |
| **Best Actor**: **Abou Sangaré – Souleymane's Story as Souleymane**‡; Adam Bessa – Ghost Trail as Hamid; Paul Kircher – And Their Children After Them as Anthony Casati; Karim Leklou – Jim's Story as Aymeric; Pierre Niney – The Count of Monte Cristo as Edmond Dantès | **Best Actress**: **Karla Sofía Gascón – Emilia Pérez as Emilia Pérez / Juan "Manitas" Del Monte**‡; Hafsia Herzi – Borgo as Melissa; Agnès Jaoui – This Life of Mine as Barberie "Barbie" Bichette; Anamaria Vartolomei – Being Maria as Maria Schneider; Hélène Vincent – When Fall Is Coming as Michelle Giraud |
| **Best Male Revelation**: **Clément Faveau – Holy Cow as Totone**‡; Sayyid El Alami – And Their Children After Them as Hacine; Malik Frikah – Beating Hearts as Clotaire; Félix Kysyl – Misericordia as Jérémie Pastor; Pierre Lottin – When Fall Is Coming as Vincent Perrin | **Best Female Revelation**: **Ghjuvanna Benedetti – The Kingdom as Lesia Savelli**‡; Maïwène Barthélemy – Holy Cow as Marie-Lise; Malou Khebizi – Wild Diamond as Liane; Clara-Maria Laredo – In His Own Image as Antonia; Megan Northam – Rabia as Rabia |
| **Best First Film**: **Holy Cow – Louise Courvoisier**‡; Ghost Trail – Jonathan Millet; The Kingdom – Julien Colonna; Rabia – Mareike Engelhardt; Wild Diamond – Agathe Riedinger | **Best Screenplay**: **Emilia Pérez – Jacques Audiard**‡; Ghost Trail – Jonathan Millet and Florence Rochat; Misericordia – Alain Guiraudie; Souleymane's Story – Boris Lojkine and Delphine Agut; When Fall Is Coming – François Ozon |
| **Best Cinematography**: **The Count of Monte Cristo – Nicolas Bolduc**‡; The Beast – Josée Deshaies; Emilia Pérez – Paul Guilhaume; Misericordia – Claire Mathon; Souleymane's Story – Tristan Galand | **Best Music**: **Emilia Pérez – Camille and Clément Ducol**‡; And Their Children After Them – Amaury Chabauty; The Beast – Bertrand Bonello and Anna Bonello; Ghost Trail – Yuksek; The Most Precious of Cargoes – Alexandre Desplat |
| **Best Documentary**: **Dahomey – Mati Diop**‡; Bye Bye Tiberias – Lina Soualem; Journey into Gaza – Piero Usberti; Madame Hofmann – Sébastien Lifshitz; Orlando, My Political Biography – Paul B. Preciado | **Best Animated Film**: **Flow – Gints Zilbalodis**‡; Into the Wonderwoods – Vincent Paronnaud and Alexis Ducord; Maya, Give Me a Title – Michel Gondry; The Most Precious of Cargoes – Michel Hazanavicius; Savages – Claude Barras |
**Best International Co-Production**: **The Seed of the Sacred Fig (Iran, Germany, France) – Mohammad Rasoulof**‡; Grand Tour (Portugal, Italy, France, Germany) – Miguel Gomes; Green Border (Poland, Czech Republic, France, Belgium) – Agnieszka Holland; The Other Way Around (Spain, France) – Jonás Trueba; Puan (Argentina, Italy, France, Germany, Brazil) – María Alché and Benjamín Naishtat

=== Films with multiple nominations and awards ===
Films with multiple nominations
| Nominations | Film |
|---|---|
| 6 | Emilia Pérez |
| 5 | Misericordia |
| 5 | Souleymane's Story |
| 4 | Ghost Trail |
| 4 | When Fall Is Coming |
| 3 | And Their Children After Them |
| 3 | The Count of Monte Cristo |
| 3 | Holy Cow |
| 2 | The Beast |
| 2 | Jim's Story |
| 2 | The Kingdom |
| 2 | The Most Precious of Cargoes |
| 2 | Rabia |
| 2 | Wild Diamond |

Films with multiple wins
| Wins | Film |
|---|---|
| 5 | Emilia Pérez |
| 2 | Holy Cow |

== See also ==
- 97th Academy Awards
- 78th British Academy Film Awards
- 50th César Awards
- 70th David di Donatello
- 37th European Film Awards
- 82nd Golden Globe Awards
- 39th Goya Awards
- 14th Magritte Awards
