= The Big Hit (2020 film) =

2020 French film

- French: Un triomphe
- Directed by: Emmanuel Courcol
- Starring: Kad Merad
- Release date: 28 August 2020 (FFA)
- Running time: 105 minutes
- Country: France
- Language: French

The Big Hit (French: Un triomphe) is a 2020 French comedy-drama film directed by Emmanuel Courcol. It is a free adaptation of the experiences of Jan Jönson when he staged a theatre performance with prison inmates.

== Cast ==
- Kad Merad - Etienne Carboni
- David Ayala - Patrick Le Querrec
- Lamine Cissokho - Alex
- Sofian Khammes - Kamel Ramdane
- Pierre Lottin - Jordan Fortineau

== Reception ==
The Big Hit has an approval rating of 64% on review aggregator website Rotten Tomatoes, based on 14 reviews, and an average rating of 5.5/10.
