= Journey into Gaza =

Journey into Gaza (Voyage à Gaza) is a 2024 French and Italian documentary film by Piero Usberti. It includes footage of Gaza and its residents before October 7.

It was nominated for best documentary at the 30th Lumière Awards.
