= Ghost Trail =

2024 film by Jonathan Millet

- Theatrical release poster
- French: Les Fantômes
- Directed by: Jonathan Millet
- Written by: Jonathan Millet; Florence Rochat
- Produced by: Pauline Seigland
- Starring: Adam Bessa; Tawfeek Barhom; Julia Franz Richter; Hala Rajab
- Cinematography: Olivier Boonjing
- Edited by: Laurent Sénéchal
- Music by: Yuksek
- Production companies: Films Grand Huit; NiKo Film; Hélicotronc; VOO; BE TV; Shelter Prod
- Distributed by: Memento Distribution
- Release dates: 15 May 2024 (Cannes); 3 July 2024 (France)
- Running time: 107 minutes
- Countries: France; Germany; Belgium
- Languages: French; Arabic
- Budget: €3.9 million
- Box office: US$1.3 million

Ghost Trail (French: Les Fantômes) is a 2024 drama film co-written and directed by Jonathan Millet in his feature directorial debut. It stars Adam Bessa as a Syrian man in France who pursues the man who tortured him at Sednaya Prison. It premiered on 15 May 2024 in the Critics' Week section at the 77th Cannes Film Festival, where it competed for the Caméra d'Or.

== Cast ==
- Adam Bessa as Hamid
- Tawfeek Barhom as Harfaz
- Julia Franz Richter as Nina
- Hala Rajab as Yara
- Safiqa El Till as la mère d'Hamid
- Sylvain Samson as le chef du chantier
- Mohammad Saboor Rasooli as le vendeur afghan
- Faisal Alia as le vieil homme au centre d'accueil
- Pascal Cervo as le conseiller à la préfecture
- Mudar Ramadan as le traducteur à la préfecture
- Marie Rémond as la psychologue
- Dorado Jadiba as Jalal
- Fakher Aldeen Fayad as Herta
- Janty Omat as le volontaire
- Jacques Follorou as le journaliste

== Release ==
The film was selected to be screened as the opening film of the Critics' Week section of the 77th Cannes Film Festival, where it had its world premiere on 15 May 2024. The film was theatrically released in France on 3 July 2024 by Memento Distribution. International sales were handled by mk2 films.

== Reception ==
=== Critical response ===
On the review aggregator website Rotten Tomatoes, 97% of 34 critics' reviews are positive. Metacritic, which uses a weighted average, assigned the film a score of 75 out of 100, based on 11 critics, indicating "generally favorable" reviews. On AlloCiné, the film received an average rating of 4.0 out of 5 stars, based on 31 reviews from French critics.

=== Accolades ===
Award	Date of ceremony	Category	Recipient(s)	Result	Ref.
Cannes Film Festival	25 May 2024 (Note: The award ceremony of the 63rd Critics' Week was held on 22 May 2024.)	Grand Prix – Critics' Week	Ghost Trail	Nominated	
Cannes Film Festival	25 May 2024	Caméra d'Or	Ghost Trail	Nominated	
César Awards	28 February 2025	Best Male Revelation	Adam Bessa	Nominated	
César Awards	28 February 2025	Best First Film	Ghost Trail	Nominated	
Louis Delluc Prize	4 December 2024	Best First Film	Ghost Trail	Won	
Lumière Awards	20 January 2025	Best Actor	Adam Bessa	Nominated	
Lumière Awards	20 January 2025	Best First Film	Ghost Trail	Nominated	
Lumière Awards	20 January 2025	Best Screenplay	Jonathan Millet and Florence Rochat	Nominated	
Lumière Awards	20 January 2025	Best Music	Yuksek	Nominated	
