= Holy Cow (2024 film) =

2024 French film by Louise Courvoisier

- Theatrical release poster
- French: Vingt Dieux
- Directed by: Louise Courvoisier
- Screenplay by: Louise Courvoisier; Théo Abadie
- Produced by: Muriel Meynard
- Starring: Clément Faveau; Maiwenne Barthelemy; Luna Garret; Mathis Bertrand; Dimitry Baudry
- Cinematography: Elio Balezeaux
- Edited by: Sarah Grosset
- Production company: Ex Nihilo
- Distributed by: Pyramide Distribution
- Release dates: 17 May 2024 (Cannes); 11 December 2024 (France)
- Running time: 90 minutes
- Country: France
- Box office: $7 million

Holy Cow (French: Vingt Dieux, lit. 'Twenty Gods') is a 2024 French film directed by Louise Courvoisier from a screenplay by Courvoisier and Théo Abadie. The film marks the feature film debut of Courvoisier, as well as the on-screen debut of Clément Faveau, who stars as young farm boy Totone.

It had its world premiere in the Un Certain Regard section at the 77th Cannes Film Festival on 17 May 2024. It received four nominations at the 50th César Awards, winning Best First Film and Best Female Revelation (for Maïwene Barthelemy).

== Plot ==
In Franche-Comté, 18-year-old Totone spends his carefree days with his friends Jean-Yves and Francis, filled with flirting, drinking, and occasional brawls with youth from the neighboring village. After his father's fatal car accident while driving home from a village festival, Totone suddenly has to take sole responsibility for his younger sister Claire. He loses his job as a janitor at a cheese dairy shortly after starting when he gets into a physical altercation with a coworker, whom Totone had previously tried to steal a girlfriend from. However, his coworker's sister Marie-Lise, who runs her parents' dairy farm after being orphaned herself, is more kindly disposed toward Totone. Her high-quality milk, which was used to produce the region's best cheese last year, gives Totone an idea: he decides to take over his father's cheese dairy and win the 30,000 EUR prize for the best Comté cheese himself. To help Totone buy back the already sold tractor, his friend Jean-Yves sells his lovingly modified stock car. Since winning cheese can only be produced with winning milk, Totone starts a romance with Marie-Lise, using intimate moments to distract her while his friends Jean-Yves and Francis break in to siphon off her milk.

The cheese production process presents many setbacks for Totone – particularly challenging is lifting the hot cheese mass from the vat with a cloth. After each failed attempt, Totone needs new milk, leading to increasingly frequent visits to Marie-Lise. One evening, however, she has no time for him as she must watch over a pregnant cow. Totone offers to take turns keeping watch with her. As soon as Marie-Lise falls asleep, the cow goes into labor, and Totone must decide: should he make off with the milk or wake Marie-Lise as promised? Though Totone does steal the key to the milk chamber and lets his friends in, he returns to Marie-Lise and helps her care for the calving cow. Meanwhile, Marie-Lise's brothers come home and catch the intruders. A fight breaks out between Marie-Lise's brothers and Totone's friends, but Totone throws himself between them. This causes Jean-Yves to end their friendship, and Marie-Lise wants nothing more to do with him any more.

Totone finally manages to complete his cheese with help from his little sister. However, when attempting to register for the competition, he learns that only certified businesses are allowed to participate. So Totone breaks into Marie-Lise's farm one last time and leaves his cheese as a reconciliation gift. At the stock car race, he jumps onto the track to help Jean-Yves get his stock car running again after a rollover. Jean-Yves wins the competition, and Totone sends Claire to celebrate his triumph with him. He heads home alone but meets Marie-Lise at the exit of the grounds, who flashes her breasts at him joyfully, ready to forgive him.

== Cast ==
- Clément Faveau as Totone, an 18-year-old boy living in rural France
- Luna Garret as Claire, Totone's younger sister
- Maïwène Barthelemy as Marie-Lise, Totone's love interest
- Dimitry Baudry as Francis, one of Totone's best friends
- Mathis Bernard as Jean-Yves, one of Totone's best friends
- Armand Sancey Richard as Cyril
- Lucas Marillier as Pierrick

== Production ==
Holy Cow was filmed on location in the Jura region of France, where Courvoisier was raised. The film's ensemble of first-time actors was assembled over the course of several months by casting directors Léa Gallego and Emmanuel Thomas, who traveled to agricultural shows and stock car races to find talent.

== Release ==
Holy Cow premiered in the Un Certain Regard section of the 2024 Cannes Film Festival, where it was eligible for the Caméra d'Or. Pyramide Distribution released the film in France on 11 December 2024.

== Reception ==
On the review aggregator website Rotten Tomatoes, 95% of 19 critics' reviews are positive, with an average rating of 7/10.

The Guardian's Cath Clarke rated the film 4 out of 5 stars, praising the performances and describing it as "sentimental in the best of ways, with its warmth and hope in human nature".

Stephen Saito of The Moveable Feast drew parallels between Totone and Marie-Lise's relationship and Courvoisier's artistic approach. He noted that the love story was "driven by practicality as much as genuine affection," while the film itself "dutifully adheres to some familiar story mechanics to allow for a gentle drama to flourish."

Matthew Escosia of Film Geek Guy described the film as "carefree and warm without feeling overtly sentimental," noting that "it is a coming-of-age comedy without the filter: teenagers having non-stop sex, screwing around other people’s properties, and the longing to belong."

Oliver Armknecht (film-rezensionen.de) saw the film as a refreshing counterpoint to typical dramas about the agricultural crisis in Europe. While the initial situation is bleak, he noted that the film develops into a predominantly cheerful work with many humorous moments. He particularly praised Courvoisier's knowledgeable and realistic depiction of agricultural processes, such as the birth of a calf and cheese production. The natural presence of the non-professional cast was also highlighted positively.

Kirsten Taylor of Filmdienst detected elements reminiscent of tourism advertising, for instance in a scene where Totone and Claire attentively listen alongside tourists to a detailed explanation of hard cheese production. Nevertheless, she appreciated cheese-making as a successful narrative device that not only anchored the story in reality but also symbolized Totone's personal maturation process. Taylor emphasized the film's unsentimental approach while noting that it still portrayed its characters with great tenderness and humor.

=== Accolades ===
Award	Ceremony date	Category	Recipient(s)	Result	Ref.
Cannes Film Festival	24 May 2024	Un Certain Regard	Holy Cow	Nominated	
Cannes Film Festival	24 May 2024	Un Certain Regard – Youth Prize	Holy Cow	Won	
Cannes Film Festival	25 May 2024	Camera d'Or	Holy Cow	Nominated	
César Awards	28 February 2025	Best Female Revelation	Maïwene Barthelemy	Won	
César Awards	28 February 2025	Best Original Screenplay	Louise Courvoisier and Théo Abadie	Nominated	
César Awards	28 February 2025	Best First Film	Muriel Meynard and Louise Courvoisier	Won	
César Awards	28 February 2025	Best Original Music	Linda Courvoisier and Charlie Courvoisier	Nominated	
Louis Delluc Prize	4 December 2024	Best First Film	Holy Cow	Nominated	
Lumière Awards	20 January 2025	Best Male Revelation	Clément Faveau	Won	
Lumière Awards	20 January 2025	Best Female Revelation	Maïwène Barthélemy	Nominated	
Lumière Awards	20 January 2025	Best First Film	Holy Cow	Won	
