= The Most Precious of Cargoes (film) =

- French theatrical release poster
- French: La Plus Précieuse des marchandises
- Directed by: Michel Hazanavicius
- Screenplay by: Michel Hazanavicius; Jean-Claude Grumberg
- Based on: The Most Precious of Cargoes by Jean-Claude Grumberg
- Produced by: Patrick Sobelman; Florence Gastaud; Michel Hazanavicius
- Starring: Dominique Blanc; Grégory Gadebois; Denis Podalydès
- Narrated by: Jean-Louis Trintignant
- Edited by: Michel Hazanavicius; Laurent Pelé; Arnau Segarra
- Music by: Alexandre Desplat
- Production companies: Ex Nihilo; Les Compagnons du Cinema; Studiocanal; France 3 Cinéma; Les Films du Fleuve; RTBF (Télévision Belge); VOO; BE TV
- Distributed by: StudioCanal
- Release dates: 24 May 2024 (Cannes); 20 November 2024 (France)
- Running time: 81 minutes
- Countries: France; Belgium
- Language: French
- Box office: $4.3 million

The Most Precious of Cargoes (French: La Plus Précieuse des marchandises) is a 2024 animated war drama film directed by Michel Hazanavicius, co-written with Jean-Claude Grumberg and based on the latter's 2019 novel of the same name. Narrated by Jean-Louis Trintignant in his last film production (and released after his death), it follows a solitary wife who finds an orphan Jewish girl during the World War II in Poland.

The film had its world premiere at the main competition of the 77th Cannes Film Festival on 24 May 2024, where it competed for the Palme d'Or. It was theatrically released in France by StudioCanal on 20 November, and received positive reviews from French audiences. At the 50th César Awards, it received three nominations including Best Animated Feature Film.

== Plot ==
The story centers on a Holocaust-surviving Jewish girl whose father throws her from a moving train heading to Auschwitz and is ultimately found by a woodcutter and his family.

== Cast ==
- Jean-Louis Trintignant as the narrator
- Grégory Gadebois as Woodcutter
- Denis Podalydès as The Man with the Broken Face
- Dominique Blanc as The Wife

== Production ==
Hazanavicius boarded the project in 2019, but the COVID-19 pandemic brought it to a halt, allowing him to shoot the 2022 zombie-comedy film Final Cut in the interim.

It was initially announced that Gérard Depardieu would voice the role of the woodcutter. However, after multiple accusations of sexual assault and one of rape were made against him, the actor withdrew from the project in October 2023, by mutual agreement with the production. At the time of his withdrawal, Depardieu had not yet recorded his part and had only done voice tests. He was replaced by Grégory Gadebois.

The film features narration from Jean-Louis Trintignant in what would ultimately be his final film role, with said narration being recorded prior to his death in 2022.

== Release ==
The film was selected to compete for the Palme d'Or at the 77th Cannes Film Festival, where it had its world premiere on 24 May 2024. It was the first animated feature to be screened in the main competition at Cannes since Ari Folman's Waltz with Bashir in 2008. It was also served as the opening film for the 2024 Annecy International Animation Film Festival. It was released in France on 20 November 2024 by distributor StudioCanal.

== Reception ==
=== Critical response ===
On the review aggregator website Rotten Tomatoes, 77% of 31 critics' reviews are positive. Metacritic, which uses a weighted average, assigned the film a score of 57 out of 100, based on 4 critics, indicating "mixed or average" reviews. On AlloCiné, the film received an average rating of 4.0 out of 5, based on 43 reviews from French critics.

=== Accolades ===
Award	Date of ceremony	Category	Recipient(s)	Result	Ref.
Annecy International Animation Film Festival	15 June 2024	Cristal for Best Feature Film	Michel Hazanavicius	Nominated	
Cannes Film Festival	25 May 2024	Palme d'Or	Michel Hazanavicius	Nominated	
César Awards	28 February 2025	Best Adaptation	Michel Hazanavicius and Jean-Claude Grumberg	Nominated	
César Awards	28 February 2025	Best Original Music	Alexandre Desplat	Nominated	
César Awards	28 February 2025	Best Animated Feature Film	Florence Gastaud, Michel Hazanavicius and Patrick Sobelman	Nominated	
Lumière Awards	20 January 2025	Best Animated Film	Michel Hazanavicius	Nominated	
Magritte Awards	22 February 2025	Best Foreign Film	Michel Hazanavicius	Won	
Valladolid International Film Festival	26 October 2024	Golden Spike	Michel Hazanavicius	Nominated	
Valladolid International Film Festival	26 October 2024	Seminci Joven Award	Michel Hazanavicius	Nominated	
