= The Count of Monte Cristo (2024 film) =

French drama film

- Theatrical release poster
- French: Le Comte de Monte-Cristo
- Directed by: Matthieu Delaporte; Alexandre de La Patellière
- Screenplay by: Matthieu Delaporte; Alexandre de La Patellière
- Based on: The Count of Monte Cristo by Alexandre Dumas
- Produced by: Dimitri Rassam
- Starring: Pierre Niney; Bastien Bouillon; Anaïs Demoustier; Anamaria Vartolomei; Laurent Lafitte
- Cinematography: Nicolas Bolduc
- Edited by: Célia Lafitedupont
- Music by: Jérôme Rebotier
- Production companies: Chapter 2; Pathé; Fargo Films
- Distributed by: Pathé Distribution
- Release dates: 22 May 2024 (Cannes); 28 June 2024 (France)
- Running time: 178 minutes
- Country: France
- Languages: French; Italian; English; Romanian
- Budget: €42.9 million
- Box office: $100 million

The Count of Monte Cristo (French: Le Comte de Monte-Cristo) is a 2024 French historical action adventure film based on the 1844 novel by Alexandre Dumas. Adapted and directed by Matthieu Delaporte and Alexandre de La Patellière, the film stars Pierre Niney as Edmond Dantès.

The Count of Monte Cristo had its world premiere at the 77th Cannes Film Festival on May 22, 2024, and was released theatrically in France a month later by Pathé. With a budget estimated at €42.9 million, the film was the most expensive French production of 2024. It sold over 9 million admissions in France, where it was the second highest-grossing film of 2024 and grossed $100 million worldwide.

It also became the biggest success for Pathé since Bienvenue Chez Les Ch'tis (2008).

== Plot ==
In 1815, sailor Edmond Dantès defies orders to rescue a shipwrecked woman from the Mediterranean Sea. The woman, Angèle, carries a letter from the exiled Napoleon, which Captain Danglars seizes. Upon reaching Marseille, Danglars reports Edmond to shipowner Morrel, but Morrel dismisses Danglars for neglecting his duty to aid survivors and promotes Edmond in his place.

Edmond returns home to share the news with his fiancée, Mercédès Herrera, and her cousin, Fernand de Morcerf, who harbors feelings for her. Edmond asks Fernand to be his best man at their upcoming wedding. However, on the wedding day, Edmond is arrested and accused of being a Bonapartist. Brought before Gérard de Villefort, Marseille's deputy prosecutor, Edmond maintains his innocence, prompting Villefort to consider releasing him. However, Edmond reveals he knows Angèle's identity. Villefort detains him further while interrogating Danglars and Fernand.

Villefort conspires with Danglars and Fernand to ensure Edmond's imprisonment. Angèle, Villefort's sister, demands Edmond's release and threatens to expose Villefort's affair with Danglars' wife. To silence her, Villefort enlists Danglars to eliminate Angèle. Edmond is imprisoned in the Château d'If, where he meets fellow inmate Abbé Faria, who educates him in languages, science, and culture over eight years. Faria also reveals the location of a vast treasure on the island of Monte Cristo. Before their planned escape, Faria is fatally injured by a tunnel collapse. Edmond takes Faria's body to his cell, hides in the burial sack in his place, and, after being thrown into the sea, escapes and swims to freedom.

Returning to Marseille, Edmond learns his father has died, and Mercédès has married Fernand and moved to Paris. Edmond journeys to Monte Cristo, where he finds the hidden treasure. A year later, he reemerges as the Count of Monte Cristo, intent on revenge. He locates Angèle, sold by Danglars into prostitution, now dying. She reveals she once tried to expose Villefort's crimes, including his attempt to bury his illegitimate son, André, alive. Angèle rescued André, placing him in an orphanage. Edmond takes André under his wing, renaming him Prince Andrea Cavalcanti, and makes him a key player in his plans.

The Count orchestrates a series of schemes against his enemies. He stages a rescue of Fernand's son, Albert, earning Fernand's trust. Through Albert, the Count gains introductions to Danglars and Villefort. He also reunites with Mercédès, who recognizes him despite his changed appearance. Meanwhile, Edmond uses Andrea to charm Eugénie, Danglars's daughter, and introduces Haydée, a beautiful woman under his protection, encouraging her to captivate Albert.

Edmond's revenge unfolds with precision. News spreads of Danglars's fleet disappearing, causing his stocks to crash. Fernand, using his access to military intelligence, informs Danglars that the reports are false. Danglars seeks profit by buying the stocks at a low price before the market learns the truth so borrows money from Monte Cristo using all his assets as collateral. At a trial where Danglars seeks to sue the newspaper for defamation, Andrea reveals himself as Villefort's illegitimate son, exposing Villefort's past crimes. Villefort, humiliated, leaves the courtroom, sparing his former mistress from scandal. Danglars cannot repay the loan in time so forfeits his assets. André, driven by revenge, assassinates his father but is killed while fleeing. Haydée, devastated by André's death, turns against the Count, holding him responsible.

As Haydée and Albert plan to leave, Haydée sees the Count's eyes in Albert. They are confronted by the Count, who demands that Haydée reveal the truth of Albert's father's betrayal of her father, Ali Pasha of Janina. Enraged, Albert challenges the Count to a duel. Mercédès confronts Edmond, pleading for her son Albert's life. Edmond agrees to spare Albert, ending their duel without bloodshed. He encourages Haydée and Albert to find happiness together. Mercédès leaves Fernand, who confronts Edmond in desperation. The two duel, with Edmond emerging victorious. Refusing to kill Fernand, Edmond leaves him to live with his disgrace and losses.

Edmond leaves his estate, embarking on a life of travel. In a final letter to Mercédès, he writes: "All human wisdom is contained in these two words: 'Wait and Hope.'"

== Cast ==
- Pierre Niney as Edmond Dantès / Lord Halifax / Abbé Busoni
- Bastien Bouillon as Fernand de Morcerf
- Anaïs Demoustier as Mercédès Herrera
- Anamaria Vartolomei as Haydée
- Amaya Ducellier as young Haydée
- Laurent Lafitte as Gérard de Villefort
- Pierfrancesco Favino as Abbé Faria
- Patrick Mille as Danglars
- Vassili Schneider as Albert de Morcerf
- Julien de Saint Jean as Andrea
- Julie de Bona as Victoria Danglars
- Adèle Simphal as Angèle de Villefort
- Marie Narbonne as Eugénie Danglars
- Bernard Blancan as Louis Dantès

== Production ==
The film is written and directed by Matthieu Delaporte and Alexandre de La Patellière and produced by Chapter 2 and Pathé Films. They were revealed to be working on the project in November 2020. It is co-produced by M6 Films, Fargo Films, Logical Content Ventures and Umedia.

With a budget estimated in €42.9 million, The Count of Monte Cristo is the most expensive French film of 2024.

=== Casting ===
Pierre Niney was cast in the lead role in February 2023. In July 2023, Anaïs Demoustier, Laurent Lafitte, Anamaria Vartolomei, Bastien Bouillon, Patrick Mille, Vassili Schneider, and Julien de Saint Jean were cast in the film.

=== Filming ===
Filming lasted 76 days from 24 July 2023 to 21 November 2023.

It took place mainly in France : in the Paris Region, in Occitania, and in Provence-Alpes-Côte d'Azur, notably at the Château d'If and for one scene on the Presqu'île de Giens. Several locations were used to represent the residence of the Count of Monte-Cristo : the Château de Ferrières (Seine-et-Marne), digitally modified for its external appearance, the Cathédrale Saint-Étienne de Meaux as the background to the scene of the fight with Albert and the old chapter house of the episcopal palace of Meaux for the rehearsal room, the Palais Brongniart (Bourse de Paris) for the drawing room, le Château d'Aubiry (Pyrénées-Orientales) for the hall, the staircases and the arms room, and lastly the Château de Dampont (Val-d'Oise) for a bedroom.

The Hôtel de la Païva was used for interior scenes as well as Lord Halifax's dining room. Several scenes were also filmed at the Maison d'éducation de la Légion d'honneur at Saint-Denis : the library of the abbey adjoining the Basilique Saint-Denis served as the Prosecutor's office. Furthermore some shots were taken in the Cloister or in the hallway leading to The Salon des Princes.

In Occitania, filming took place in the Massif de la Clape, the Château de l'Engarran, in Lavérune, which served as the backdrop for the Morcerf residence, as well as at Pézenas and Villeneuvette, where the church of Notre-Dame-de-l'Assomption was used to represent the chapel in which the wedding ceremony of Dantès and Mercédès took place.

Other scenes were shot at the Grand Harbour of Valletta, in Malta, used as a representation of the Old Port of Marseille, as well as Cyprus. The ship Pharaon was itself represented by the Étoile du Roy, replica of an 18th Century Privateer Frigate, registered at the port of Saint-Malo.

On-set filming took place at Lites Studios, in Brussels (Belgium), in particular for the Shipwrecking scene and for the sequence of Dantès' escape. For the latter, filmed as a tracking shot, Pierre Niney trained with freediving world champion Stéphane Mifsud, by being bound in a weighted sack and thrown into the sea.

== Release ==
The film was selected to be screened out of competition at the 77th Cannes Film Festival, where it had its world premiere on 22 May 2024, and earned a nearly 11-minute standing ovation at the end of its screening.

It was theatrically released by Pathé in France on 28 June 2024, and had its international debut at the 2nd Mediterrane Film Festival on 22 June 2024. It also played at the 28th Fantasia International Film Festival on 19 July 2024, and has been scheduled to screen in a gala presentation at the 2024 Cinéfest Sudbury International Film Festival. It made its U.S. premiere at the Hamptons International Film Festival on 11 October 2024. Samuel Goldwyn Films released the film in theaters on 20 December 2024 in the United States.

It was featured in the Limelight section of the 54th International Film Festival Rotterdam screened in February 2025.

In 2026, the BBC acquired the British rights to the film, splitting it into a miniseries of four 45-minute episodes: it was released with English subtitles on BBC iPlayer and BBC Four on 2 May 2026.

== Music ==
The music of the film is composed by Jérôme Rebotier and released by Milan Records.

No.	Title	Length
1.	"Tempête"	3:19
2.	"Mercédès"	1:58
3.	"Le trésor"	3:57
4.	"Dorul (Chanson d'Haydée)"	3:49
5.	"Haydée"	1:42
6.	"Edmond et Mercédès"	3:10
7.	"L'arrestation"	3:31
8.	"Le mariage"	1:01
9.	"Vengeance (Thème de Monte Cristo)"	1:36
10.	"Le château d'If (Version longue)"	3:26
11.	"Dantès rejoint Faria"	2:21
12.	"Mort de Faria"	1:48
13.	"Le domaine"	2:08
14.	"Le bal d'Eugénie"	1:51
15.	"Dantès reprend des forces"	1:00
16.	"Haydée supplie Albert"	1:40
17.	"Le piège se referme"	2:05
18.	"Le duel"	2:05
19.	"L'évasion (Part 1)"	2:36
20.	"L'évasion (Part 2)"	1:40
21.	"La mort du cerf"	2:07
22.	"Le revenant"	1:27
23.	"La folie"	2:03
24.	"Chasse à courre"	1:02
25.	"L'éducation d'André"	1:40
26.	"Le récit d'Angèle"	4:23
27.	"Les années Faria"	1:25
28.	"Le dîner d'Auteuil"	3:33
29.	"Les plans"	1:55
30.	"Albert et Haydée"	1:07
31.	"Les traîtres"	2:12
32.	"Le racket"	2:20
33.	"Opium"	2:40
34.	"Monte Cristo"	2:20
35.	"Le trésor (Reprise) - Adieux à Eugénie"	2:49
36.	"L'assassinat (Version longue)"	3:24
37.	"Albert rejoint Haydée"	2:35
38.	"Monte Cristo raconte à Mercédès"	1:37
39.	"La haine de Fernand"	0:59
40.	"La confrontation"	3:45
41.	"La vie d'après"	4:12
Total length:		96:18

== Reception ==
=== Box office ===
The film had sold 9 million tickets in France and grossed $100 million worldwide. It finished 2024 as the second-most watched film in French cinemas in the year.

=== Critical response ===
On the review aggregator website Rotten Tomatoes, 96% of 67 critics' reviews are positive, with an average rating of 7.9/10. The website's consensus reads: "Condensing Alexandre Dumas' hefty tome into a brisk and lavishly appointed action-adventure, this French adaptation of The Count of Monte-Cristo hits the sweet spot with rapier-like precision." Metacritic, which uses a weighted average, assigned the film a score of 75 out of 100, based on 10 critics, indicating "generally favorable" reviews. On AlloCiné, the film received an average rating of 3.6 out of 5, based on 40 reviews from French critics and an average viewer rating of 4.5/5 based on over 3300 reviews. In fact, the film is highest-rated French language film of all time by viewers on AlloCiné.

Jeannette Catsoulis of The New York Times called it "stirringly acted and gorgeously filmed, this swashbuckler leaves previous versions of Dumas's famous revenge saga in the dust". Wendy Ide of The Guardian rated it 4/5, noting it was "directed with verve and acted with gusto." In another review for Screen International, Ide wrote: "This latest version of the much-adapted tale is not about taking filmmaking risks or storytelling liberties. It is true to the spirit of the source material, if not entirely true to the original story."Peter Debruge of Variety noted that the film could have competed for a best picture Oscar if it were released in English decades earlier. Stephany Bunbury described the film as "an old-fashioned swashbuckler stretched beyond conventional limits" in a Financial Times review but rated it 4/5.

In a review for The Times, Kevin Maher rated it 4/5 and highlighted: "'Will you do good, or will your heart fill with hate?' asks Edmond’s prison mate and mentor, Abbé Faria (Pierfrancesco Favino), early into Edmond’s 14-year stretch on the Château d’If island hellhole. It’s a beautiful line, emblematic of the novel’s ambiguity about the morality of revenge, and deftly delivered by the character-acting ace Favino."

In a review for The Hollywood Reporter, Jordan Mintzer wrote: "We’ve seen so many stories like this by now that, although The Count of Monte Cristo remains a true original of the genre, this pricey and polished version plays like any old revenge fantasy."

Deadline Hollywood's Pete Hammond wrote that "Delaporte and de la Patellliere have made something fresh and exciting from one of the oldest stories around" and noted the film was "one of the best" he saw at Cannes in 2024.

== Accolades ==
On 11 September 2024, the film was 1 of 4 films shortlisted by France's Oscar committee for consideration as the country's submission for Best International Feature Film at the 97th Academy Awards. The film also made the January longlist of 10 titles in the Best Film Not in the English Language category at the 2025 British Academy Film Awards. The film received 14 nominations for the 50th César Awards.

Year	Award	Category	Recipient(s)	Result	Ref.
2024	Cabourg Film Festival	Golden Swan for Best Film	The Count of Monte Cristo	Won	
2024	Cinéfest Sudbury International Film Festival	Audience Choice	The Count of Monte Cristo	Won	
2024	Fantasia International Film Festival	Cheval Noir for Best Film	The Count of Monte Cristo	Won	
2025	Goya Awards	Best European Film	The Count of Monte Cristo	Nominated	
2025	Lumière Awards	Best Director	Matthieu Delaporte and Alexandre de La Patellière	Nominated	
2025	Lumière Awards	Best Actor	Pierre Niney	Nominated	
2025	Lumière Awards	Best Cinematography	Nicolas Bolduc	Won	
