= Borgo (film) =

2023 film by Stéphane Demoustier

- Theatrical release poster
- Directed by: Stéphane Demoustier
- Screenplay by: Stéphane Demoustier
- Produced by: Jean des Forêts
- Starring: Hafsia Herzi; Moussa Mansaly; Louis Memmi; Michel Fau; Pablo Pauly; Florence Loiret Caille
- Cinematography: David Chambille
- Edited by: Damien Maestraggi
- Music by: Philippe Sarde
- Production companies: Petit Film; France 3 Cinéma
- Distributed by: Le Pacte
- Release dates: 25 August 2023 (Angoulême); 17 April 2024 (France)
- Running time: 117 minutes
- Country: France
- Language: French
- Box office: $1.9 million

Borgo is a 2023 French prison drama film written and directed by Stéphane Demoustier. It stars Hafsia Herzi as a prison guard in Corsica. The supporting cast includes Moussa Mansaly, Louis Memmi, Michel Fau, Pablo Pauly and Florence Loiret Caille.

The film had its world premiere at the Angoulême Francophone Film Festival on 25 August 2023, and was released in France by Le Pacte on 17 April 2024. At the 50th César Awards, Herzi won Best Actress.

== Premise ==
Prison guard Mélissa is transferred to Borgo penitentiary center in Corsica, where she finds herself implicated in a double murder for which she is suspected of complicity.

== Cast ==
- Hafsia Herzi as Mélissa Dahleb
- Moussa Mansaly as Djibril
- Louis Memmi as Saveriu
- Michel Fau as le commissaire
- Pablo Pauly as le brigadier
- Florence Loiret Caille as la directrice
- Cédric Appietto as Joseph Marchetti
- Henri-Noël Tabary as Anto
- Anthony Morganti as Pascal Rossi
- Thomas Muziotti as Scaniglia

== Production ==
Stéphane Demoustier wrote the film's screenplay, in collaboration with Pascal-Pierre Garbarini. The film was inspired by a double murder that took place at Bastia–Poretta Airport in 2017. The case – dubbed by French media as the "kiss of death" – involved prison warden Cathy Sénéchal, who befriended gangsters of the Gang de la Brise de Mer while she worked at the prison in Borgo. She later confessed to her role in the crime, which involved giving a kiss to two men in order to single them out as targets to an assassin.

Principal photography took place primarily in Ajaccio (Corse-du-Sud) and the surrounding area, as well in the abandoned maison d'arrêt in Compiègne (Oise) The airport scenes were shot in Grenoble.

== Release ==
Borgo was selected to be screened at the 16th Angoulême Francophone Film Festival, where it had its world premiere on 25 August 2023.

The film was theatrically released in France on 17 April 2024 by Le Pacte. International sales were handled by Paris-based company Charades.

== Reception ==
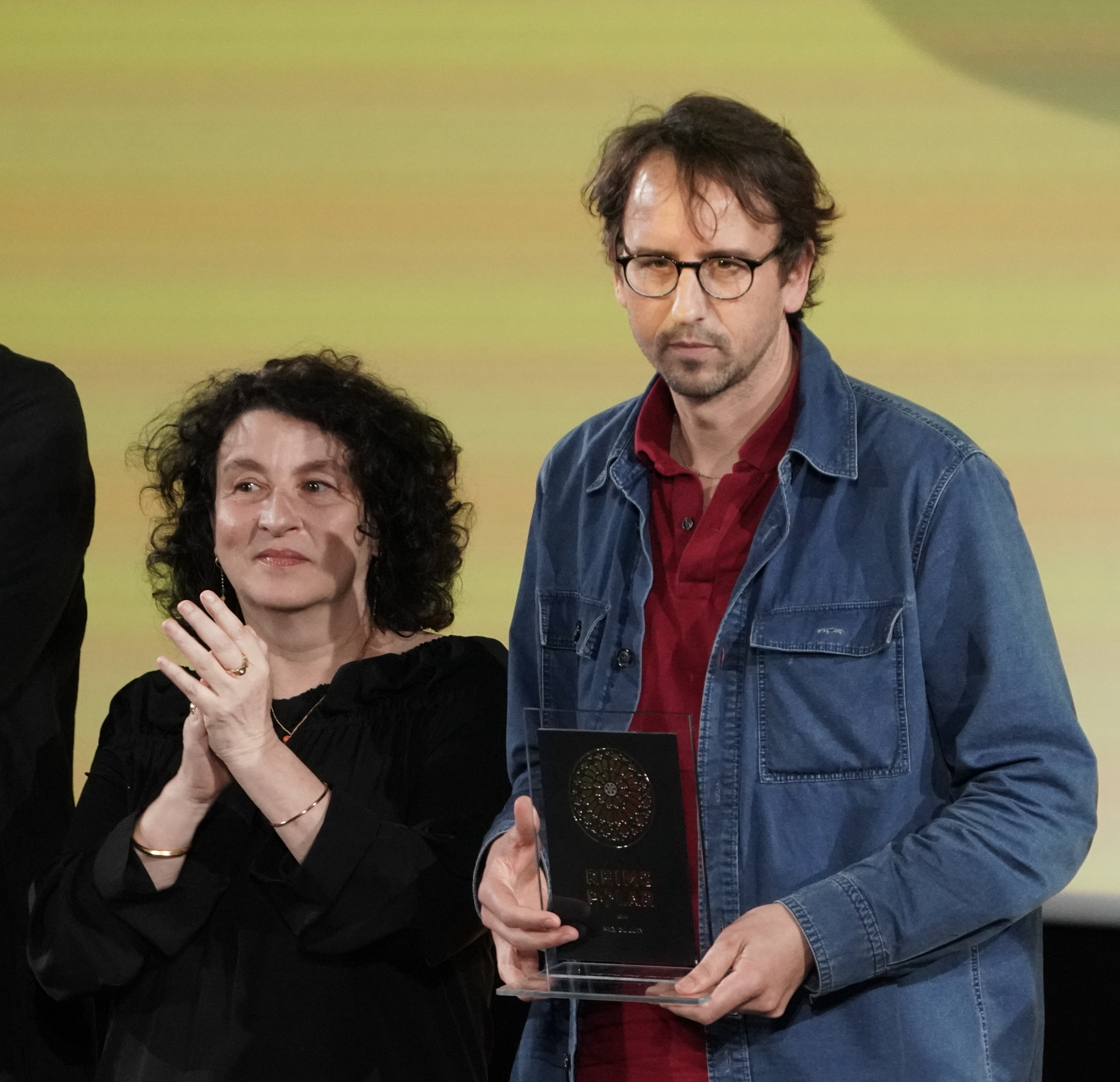
Demoustier receiving the Prix du jury at Reims Polar

=== Critical response ===
On AlloCiné, the film received an average rating of 3.9 out of 5 stars, based on 33 reviews from French critics.

=== Accolades ===
Award	Date of ceremony	Category	Recipient(s)	Result	Ref.
César Awards	28 February 2025	Best Actress	Hafsia Herzi	Won	
César Awards	28 February 2025	Best Original Screenplay	Stéphane Demoustier	Nominated	
Lumière Awards	20 January 2025	Best Actress	Hafsia Herzi	Nominated	
Reims Polar	14 April 2024	Prix du jury (Note: Shared with Only the River Flows.)	Borgo	Won	
