= Jim's Story =

2024 film by Arnaud and Jean-Marie Larrieu

- Theatrical release poster
- French: Le Roman de Jim
- Directed by: Arnaud Larrieu; Jean-Marie Larrieu
- Screenplay by: Arnaud Larrieu; Jean-Marie Larrieu
- Based on: Le Roman de Jim by Pierric Bailly
- Produced by: Kevin Chneiweiss
- Starring: Karim Leklou; Laetitia Dosch; Sara Giraudeau; Bertrand Belin
- Cinematography: Irina Lubtchansky
- Edited by: Annette Dutertre
- Music by: Bertrand Belin; Shane Copin
- Production companies: SBS Productions; Arte France Cinéma
- Distributed by: Pyramide Distribution
- Release dates: 22 May 2024 (Cannes); 14 August 2024 (France)
- Running time: 101 minutes
- Country: France
- Language: French
- Box office: $3 million

Jim's Story (French: Le Roman de Jim) is a 2024 French comedy-drama film written and directed by Arnaud and Jean-Marie Larrieu. It is an adaptation of the 2021 novel Le Roman de Jim by Pierric Bailly. It is a comedic melodrama about fatherhood.

It had its world premiere in the non-competitive Cannes Premiere section at the 77th Cannes Film Festival on 22 May 2024. It was theatrically released on 14 August 2024 by Pyramide Distribution. At the 50th César Awards, Leklou won Best Actor for his performance.

== Plot ==
A family's happy life in the Jura Mountains is gradually upended following the return of their son's biological father.

== Cast ==
- Karim Leklou as Aymeric
- Laetitia Dosch as Florence
- Sara Giraudeau as Olivia
- Bertrand Belin as Christophe
- Noée Abita as Aurélie
- Andranic Manet as Jim (age 23)
- Eol Personne as Jim (ages 7 and 10)
- Mireille Herbstmeyer as Monique
- Suzanne De Baecque as Léa
- Sabrina Seyvecou as Cécile
- Marguerite Machuel as Charlotte (age 23)
- Robinson Stévenin as Titi
- Christine Dory as Aymeric's mother

== Production ==
The film's screenplay was adapted by Arnaud and Jean-Marie Larrieu from Pierric Bailly's novel Le Roman de Jim, which was first published by Éditions P.O.L in March 2021. The book sold over 25,000 copies. Kevin Chneiweiss produced the film for SBS Productions, in co-production with Arte France Cinéma.

Principal photography began on 17 May 2023 in Lyon. However, the majority of filming took place in the Haut-Jura region from 19 June to 28 July 2023 between the villages of Saint-Claude and Bellecombe, where the plot of the book takes place.

== Release ==
The film was selected to be screened in the non-competitive Cannes Premiere section at the 77th Cannes Film Festival, where it had its world premiere on 22 May 2024.

The film was theatrically released in France on 14 August 2024 by Pyramide Distribution, with the company's sales arm Pyramide International handling world sales for the film.

== Reception ==
=== Critical response ===
On AlloCiné, the film received an average rating of 4.1 out of 5 stars, based on 38 reviews from French critics.

=== Accolades ===
Award	Date of ceremony	Category	Recipient(s)	Result	Ref.
Brussels International Film Festival	3 July 2024	Grand Prix – International Competition	Arnaud and Jean-Marie Larrieu	Won	
César Awards	28 February 2025	Best Actor	Karim Leklou	Won	
Louis Delluc Prize	4 December 2024	Best Film	Jim's Story	Nominated	
Lumière Awards	20 January 2025	Best Film	Jim's Story	Nominated	
Lumière Awards	20 January 2025	Best Actor	Karim Leklou	Nominated	
