= Misericordia (2024 film) =

2024 film by Alain Guiraudie

- Theatrical release poster
- French: Miséricorde
- Directed by: Alain Guiraudie
- Written by: Alain Guiraudie
- Based on: Rabalaïre by Alain Guiraudie
- Produced by: Charles Gillibert
- Starring: Félix Kysyl; Catherine Frot; Jacques Develay; Jean-Baptiste Durand; David Ayala
- Cinematography: Claire Mathon
- Edited by: Jean-Christophe Hym
- Music by: Marc Verdaguer
- Production companies: CG Cinéma; Scala Films; Arte France Cinéma; Andergraun Films; Rosa Filmes
- Distributed by: Les Films du Losange (France); Karma Films (Spain)
- Release dates: 20 May 2024 (Cannes); 16 October 2024 (France); 21 March 2025 (Spain)
- Running time: 102 minutes
- Countries: France; Spain; Portugal
- Language: French
- Box office: $1.8 million

Misericordia (French: Miséricorde) is a 2024 black comedy thriller film written and directed by Alain Guiraudie, partially adapted from his 2021 novel Rabalaïre. It stars Félix Kysyl and Catherine Frot.

The film premiered in the Cannes Premiere section at the 77th Cannes Film Festival on 20 May 2024, where it competed for the Queer Palm. It was theatrically released in France on 16 October 2024, by Les Films du Losange. The film received the Louis Delluc Prize for 2024. It received eight nominations at the 50th César Awards, including Best Film, but won none.

== Plot ==
Jérémie Pastor returns from Toulouse to his hometown of Saint-Martial, Aveyron, to attend the funeral of his former boss, a local baker. The deceased's widow, Martine Rigal, invites Jérémie to spend the night at her house. The next day, Jérémie elects to extend his stay in the village at Martine's invitation. Jérémie's presence is resented by Martine's brutish son Vincent, an old acquaintance from college. Vincent becomes jealous when Jérémie grows close to Vincent's best friend Walter Bonchamp, another old acquaintance, making regular visits to his house to chat over drinks.

Vincent accuses Jérémie of wanting to have sex with his mother. During a physical altercation, Vincent overpowers Jérémie and demands that he leave town. During one of Jérémie's visits, Walter rejects his sexual advances and angrily throws him out, threatening him with a shotgun. Shortly afterwards, Jérémie is walking down a road when he encounters Vincent, who drives him to a nearby forest. Another altercation ensues, which ends with Jérémie bashing Vincent's head in with a rock, killing him. That night, Jérémie buries Vincent's body in the forest and abandons his car in Millau.

When Jérémie returns to Martine's house the next morning, she tells him that Vincent's wife, Annie, is worried because Vincent did not come home the previous night and was not at work that morning. Jérémie claims he had a few drinks at Walter's before spending the night in a barn because it was raining, though Martine says that according to Walter, Jérémie was not at his place the previous night.

When Vincent's car is found in Millau, Martine and Annie suspect that Jérémie is not telling them everything. Jérémie provides a false alibi, claiming that after Walter threw him out, Vincent found him on the road, so they drove around for a while in Vincent's car before he ultimately dropped Jérémie off in Millau and told him not to return to Saint-Martial. The next day, Jérémie visits Walter, who is certain that Vincent would never leave town without his car. Walter is surprised when Jérémie says his attraction to him is genuine.

In the confessional of the village church, Father Philippe Griseul informs Jérémie that he knows he killed Vincent. Philippe confesses his love for Jérémie and agrees to conceal his crime in exchange for his affection, despite the fact that Jérémie does not reciprocate Philippe's feelings. Returning to Martine's house, Jérémie is questioned by a policeman and a policewoman investigating Vincent's disappearance. Jérémie insists that he and Vincent spent all night driving around and talking. When asked about his relationship with Philippe, Jérémie says they only see each other by chance. The officers suspect that Philippe is hiding something from them.

The following day, Jérémie is approached by the two police officers in the forest where he buried Vincent. Jérémie says that Vincent beat him up in Millau, something he had not told the police. As the policeman attempts to find holes in Jérémie's story, Philippe arrives and creates an alibi by claiming that Jérémie spent the night with him after returning from Millau and that they are secretly lovers.

That night, the policeman attempts to question Jérémie in his sleep, asking him if he buried Vincent's body in the forest. Jérémie screams for Martine, and the policeman flees. The following night, as the policeman goes to Martine's house again, Jérémie sneaks out and rushes to the church, telling Philippe that Martine gave the policeman a key to her house. Presuming that the policeman will next come to the church, Philippe instructs Jérémie to pretend to be in bed with him, which throws the policeman off when he arrives shortly afterwards.

Later that night, Jérémie and Philippe dig up Vincent's body and move it to the local cemetery, where Philippe disposes of the body. As Jérémie returns to Martine's house, she invites him to sleep by her side in her bed. Jérémie asks to hold Martine's hand, to which she agrees.

== Cast ==
- Félix Kysyl as Jérémie Pastor
- Catherine Frot as Martine Rigal
- Jacques Develay as Father Philippe Griseul
- Jean-Baptiste Durand as Vincent Rigal
- David Ayala as Walter Bonchamp
- Sébastien Faglain as gendarme
- Tatiana Spivakova as Annie
- Salomé Lopes as young colleague
- Elio Lunetta as Kilian Rigal
- Serge Richard as Jean-Pierre Rigal

== Production ==
The film was produced by Charles Gillibert at CG Cinéma, in co-production with Scala Films, Arte France Cinéma, Andergraun Films (Spain) and Rosa Filmes (Portugal).

Principal photography began on 30 October 2023 and wrapped on 15 December 2023. The film was shot in southern Aveyron along the border of Gard. The village of Sauclières was used as the location of the film's fictional Saint-Martial setting. The film was also shot in the nearby villages of Millau, Nant and Saint-Jean-du-Bruel. Other scenery included the Dourbie gorges, the Mont Aigoual forest and Suquet ridge. Claire Mathon served as the director of photography, after having worked on the cinematography for Guiraudie's earlier films Stranger by the Lake (2013) and Staying Vertical (2016).

== Release ==
Misericordia was selected to be screened in the non-competitive Cannes Premiere section at the 77th Cannes Film Festival, where it had its world premiere on 20 May 2024. Shortly after, Sideshow and Janus Films acquired the North American distribution rights. International sales were handled by Les Films du Losange, which also theatrically released the film in France on 16 October 2024. Karma Films theatrically released the film in Spain on 21 March 2025.

The film made its North American premiere at the 51st Telluride Film Festival. It also screened in the Special Presentations programme of the 2024 Toronto International Film Festival, as well as in the Main Slate section of the 62nd New York Film Festival. It was also selected for the 69th Valladolid International Film Festival, and had its South Asian premiere at the MAMI Mumbai Film Festival 2024 in the World Cinema section.

== Reception ==
=== Critical response ===
On the review aggregator website Rotten Tomatoes, 94% of 110 critics' reviews are positive. The website's consensus reads: "Navigating a diabolical story with fleet-footed tonal mastery, Misericordia is another superb foray into the dangers of desire from writer-director Alain Guiraudie." Metacritic, which uses a weighted average, assigned the film a score of 83 out of 100, based on 25 critics, indicating "universal acclaim". On AlloCiné, the film received an average rating of 3.9 out of 5, based on 34 reviews from French critics.

The film was named the best film of the year by the French film magazine Cahiers du Cinéma.

=== Accolades ===
Award	Date of ceremony	Category	Recipient(s)	Result	Ref.
Cahiers du Cinéma	2024	Annual Top 10 Lists	Misericordia	1st Place	
Cannes Film Festival	25 May 2024	Queer Palm	Alain Guiraudie	Nominated	
César Awards	28 February 2025	Best Film	Misericordia	Nominated	
César Awards	28 February 2025	Best Director	Alain Guiraudie	Nominated	
César Awards	28 February 2025	Best Supporting Actor	David Ayala	Nominated	
César Awards	28 February 2025	Best Supporting Actor	Jacques Develay	Nominated	
César Awards	28 February 2025	Best Supporting Actress	Catherine Frot	Nominated	
César Awards	28 February 2025	Best Male Revelation	Félix Kysyl	Nominated	
César Awards	28 February 2025	Best Original Screenplay	Alain Guiraudie	Nominated	
César Awards	28 February 2025	Best Cinematography	Claire Mathon	Nominated	
Louis Delluc Prize	4 December 2024	Best Film	Misericordia	Won	
Lumière Awards	20 January 2025	Best Film	Misericordia	Nominated	
Lumière Awards	20 January 2025	Best Director	Alain Guiraudie	Nominated	
Lumière Awards	20 January 2025	Best Screenplay	Alain Guiraudie	Nominated	
Lumière Awards	20 January 2025	Best Male Revelation	Félix Kysyl	Nominated	
Lumière Awards	20 January 2025	Best Cinematography	Claire Mathon	Nominated	
Valladolid International Film Festival	26 October 2024	Golden Spike	Misericordia	Won	
Valladolid International Film Festival	26 October 2024	Best Screenplay	Alan Guiraudie	Won	
