= Karim Leklou =

French actor (born 1982)

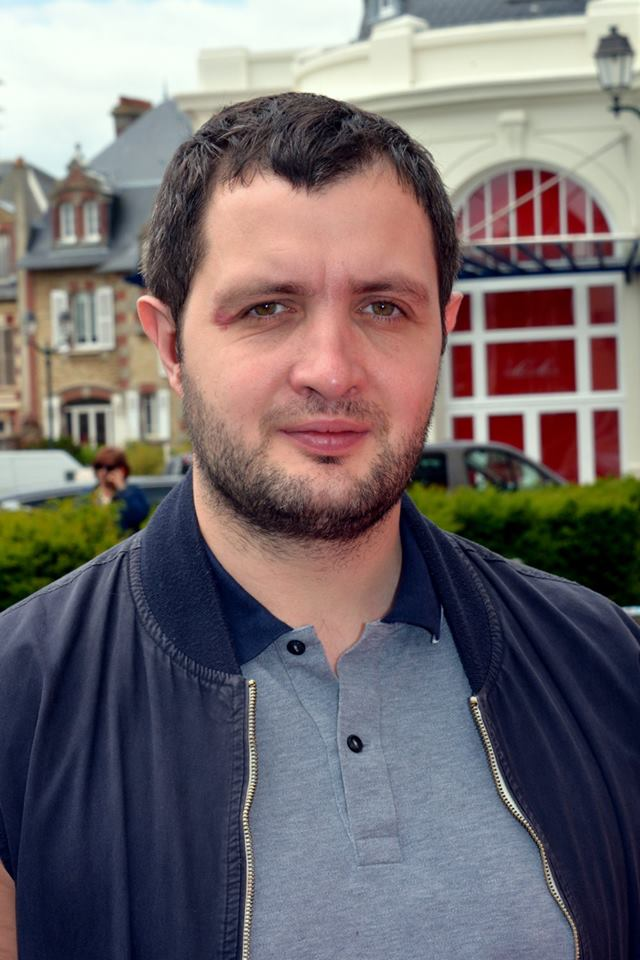
- Born: 20 June 1982 (age 42); Sèvres (Hauts-de-Seine, France)
- Occupation: Actor
- Years active: 2009–present
- Works: The World Is Yours

Karim Leklou (born June 20, 1982) is a French actor who started his career in small role in Jacques Audiard 's film A Prophet (2009) and followed by Suzanne and Grand Central. Leklou undertook a lead role in Hippocrate for both seasons (2018, 2021).

He has also starred in Sons of Ramses (2022), For My Country (2022), and Time Out (2023). In 2025, at the 50th César Awards he won for Best Actor for his performance in Jim's Story.
