= Emmanuel Courcol =

French actor and filmmaker

- Born: December 25, 1957 (age 67)
- Occupation(s): Actor, film director, screenwriter

Emmannuel Courcol (born December 25, 1957) is a French actor and filmmaker.

== Education ==
In 1984, Courcol graduated from the École Nationale des Arts et Techniques du Théâtre, where he had studied acting.

== Career ==
After acting in a number of feature films, Courcol ventured into screenwriting with the 2001 film Mademoiselle directed by Philippe Lioret. In 2010, he was nominated alongside Lioret and Olivier Adam for the César Award for Best Original Screenplay for Welcome.

Courcol's directorial debut, Ceasefire, was released in 2016. His second feature film, The Big Hit, was awarded the 2020 European Film Award for Best Comedy. The Marching Band, Courcol's third directorial effort, premiered at the 2024 Cannes Film Festival.

== Filmography ==
=== Film ===
Year	Title	Director	Writer	Actor	Role	Ref.
2001	Mademoiselle	No	Yes	Yes	Arthuis	
2004	The Light	No	Yes	Yes	Parish priest	
2009	Welcome	No	Yes	Yes	Supermarket manager	
2011	All Our Desires	No	Yes	Yes	Doctor Stroesser	
2013	Géraldine je t'aime	Yes	Yes	No	—	
2015	Boomerang	No	Yes	No	—	
2015	Face Down	No	Yes	No	—	
2016	Ceasefire	Yes	Yes	No	—	
2019	In the Name of the Land	No	Yes	Yes	Notary	
2019	I Wish Someone Were Waiting for Me Somewhere	No	Yes	No	—	
2020	The Big Hit	Yes	Yes	No	—	
2024	The Marching Band	Yes	Yes	No	—	

=== Television ===
Year	Title	Director	Writer	Actor	Role	Notes	Ref.
1997	L'histoire du Samedi	No	No	Yes	Sebastien	1 episode	
2001	The Judge is a Woman	No	No	Yes	Alexis	1 episode	
2003	Avocats & associés	No	No	Yes	Robert	1 episode	
2004	Sauveur Giordano	No	No	Yes	Michel Prévin	1 episode	
2022	Boxer les mots	Yes	Yes	No	—	TV movie	

== Awards and nominations ==
Year	Award	Category	Nominated work	Result	Ref.
2010	César Awards	Best Original Screenplay	Welcome	Nominated	
2020	European Film Awards	Best Comedy	The Big Hit	Won	
