= The Marching Band =

2024 French film

- Theatrical release poster
- French: En Fanfare
- Directed by: Emmanuel Courcol
- Screenplay by: Emmanuel Courcol; Irène Muscari; Oriane Bonduel; Marianne Tomersy
- Produced by: Marc Boudre
- Starring: Benjamin Lavernhe; Pierre Lottin; Sarah Suco
- Cinematography: Maxence Lemonnier
- Edited by: Guerric Catala
- Music by: Michel Petrossian
- Production company: Agat Film
- Distributed by: Diaphana Distribution
- Release date: 19 May 2024 (Cannes)
- Running time: 103 minutes
- Country: France
- Language: French
- Budget: €6.1 million
- Box office: $28 million

The Marching Band (also known as My Brother's Band; French: En Fanfare) is a 2024 French drama film directed by Emmanuel Courcol from a screenplay by Courcol, Irène Muscari, Oriane Bonduel and Marianne Tomersy. The film stars Benjamin Lavernhe and Pierre Lottin as long-lost brothers.

== Premise ==
When acclaimed orchestra conductor Thibaut (Lavernhe) is diagnosed with leukemia, a DNA test to find a bone marrow donor reveals that he is adopted. Thibaut meets his biological brother Jimmy (Lottin), a cook in a school canteen who plays trombone of a local marching band in Lille. When the band loses its conductor, Thibaut steps in as replacement, and the brothers learn more about the circumstances that shaped each other's lives.

== Cast ==
- Benjamin Lavernhe as Thibaut Desormeaux
- Pierre Lottin as Jimmy Lecocq
- Sarah Suco as Sabrina
- Jacques Bonnaffé as Gilbert Woszniak
- Ludmila Mikaël as Madame Desormeaux

== Release ==
The Marching Band premiered on 19 May 2024 at the 2024 Cannes Film Festival.

== Reception ==
On review aggregator website Rotten Tomatoes, the film holds an approval rating of 96% based on 24 reviews, with an average rating of 7.0/10.

== Awards and nominations ==
- 2025: Nominated for multiple César Awards including Best Actor (Benjamin Lavernhe), Best Supporting Actress (Sarah Suco), Best Film (director Emmanuel Courcol and producers Marc Bordure and Robert Guédiguian), Best Editing, and Best Original Screenplay.
- 2024 : Received the City of Donostia Audience Award at the San Sebastián International Film Festival.
- The American french film festival Los Angeles : Audience award.
