= The Kingdom (2024 French film) =

Film by Julien Colonna

- Theatrical release poster
- French: Le Royaume
- Directed by: Julien Colonna
- Screenplay by: Julien Colonna; Jeanne Herry
- Starring: Ghjuvanna Benedetti; Saveriu Santucci; Anthony Morganti; Andrea Cossu; Fédéric Poggi; Régis Gomez
- Cinematography: Antoine Cormier
- Edited by: Albertine Lastera; Yann Malcor
- Music by: Audrey Ismael
- Distributed by: Ad Vitam Distribution
- Release dates: 20 May 2024 (Cannes); 13 November 2024 (France)
- Running time: 111 minutes
- Country: France
- Language: French

The Kingdom (French: Le Royaume) is a 2024 French family crime drama directed by Julien Colonna. The film stars Ghjuvanna Benedetti as the daughter of the leader of a crime family played by Saveriu Santucci.

== Premise ==
In 1995, Lesia (Benedetti) is a 15-year-old girl in Corsica, safe from the organized crime elsewhere on the island. This changes when she is taken to her father, crime boss Pierre-Paul (Santucci), much to her chagrin. The two repair their relationship as they escape mobsters all across the island, and Lesia is drawn further into her father's world of crime.

== Cast ==
- Ghjuvanna Benedetti as Lesia
- Saveriu Santucci as Pierre-Paul
- Anthony Morganti
- Andrea Cossu
- Fédéric Poggi
- Régis Gomez

== Production ==
The birth of his daughter inspired Colonna to create a father-daughter story. The Kingdom was shot on location in Corsica with a cast composed largely of first-time local actors. On the final day of filming, a pivotal boat scene had to be reworked due to a storm over the Gulf of Ajaccio.

== Release ==
The Kingdom premiered in the Un Certain Regard portion of the 2024 Cannes Film Festival, where it was acquired by Metrograph Pictures for North American distribution rights. Ad Vitam Distribution theatrically released the film in France on 13 November 2024.

== Reception ==
=== Critical response ===
On the review aggregator website Rotten Tomatoes, 100% of 27 critics' reviews are positive, with an average rating of 7.3/10.

Peter Bradshaw from The Guardian rated the movie with four stars over five, and described it as "an intensely exciting and absorbing mob drama".

=== Accolades ===
Award	Ceremony date	Category	Recipient(s)	Result	Ref.
Cannes Film Festival	24 May 2024	Un Certain Regard	The Kingdom	Nominated	
Cannes Film Festival	25 May 2024	Camera d'Or	The Kingdom	Nominated	
Louis Delluc Prize	4 December 2024	Best First Film	The Kingdom	Nominated	
