= List of submissions to the 97th Academy Awards for Best International Feature Film =

2024 Best International Feature submissions
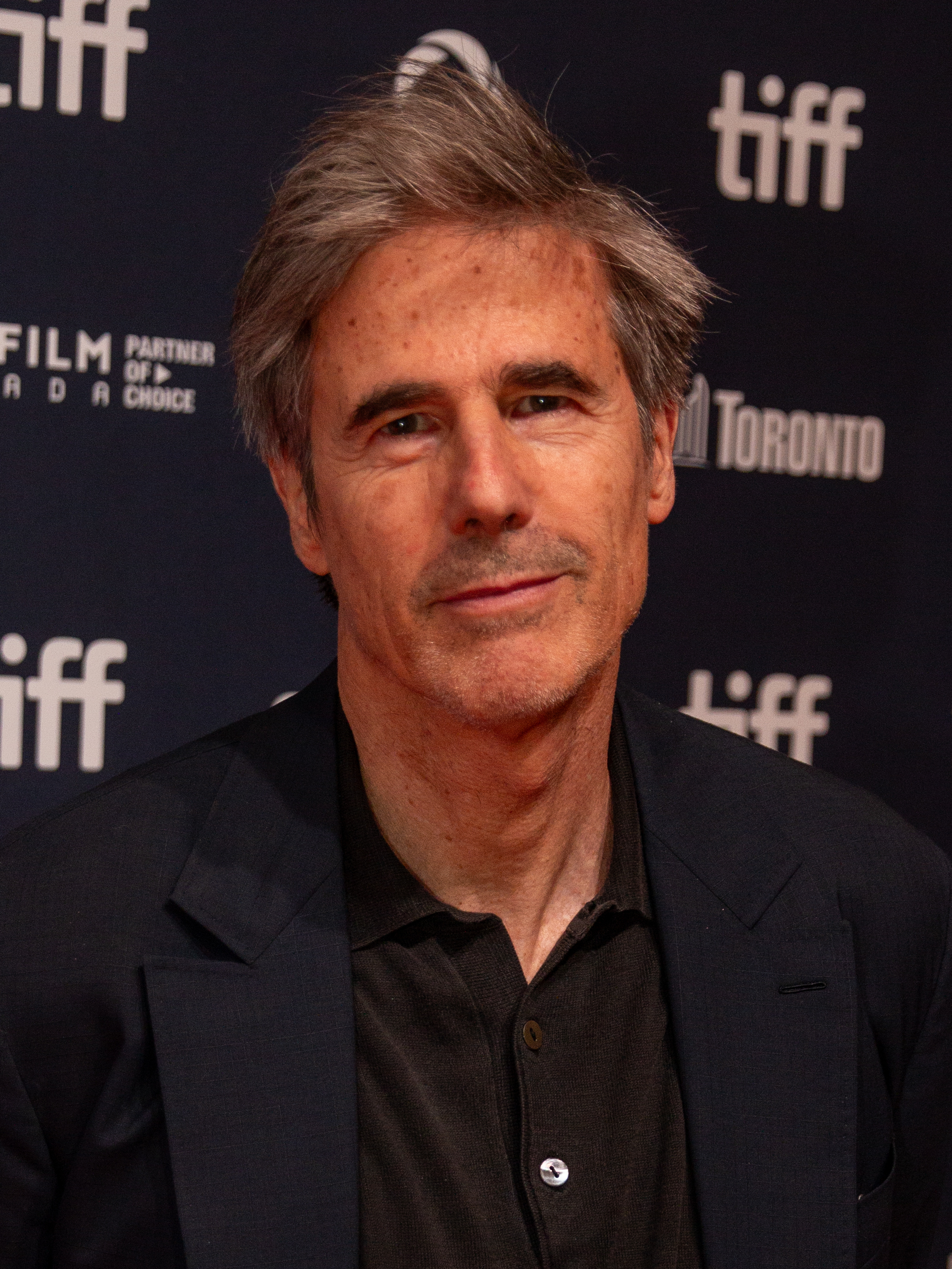
- Walter Salles directed I'm Still Here, which won the year's award.

Highlights
- Oscar winner: (Brazil) I'm Still Here
- Submissions: 89
- Debuts: none
- Total eligible: 85

This is a list of submissions to the 97th Academy Awards for the Best International Feature Film. The Academy of Motion Picture Arts and Sciences (AMPAS) has invited the film industries of various countries to submit their best film for the Academy Award for Best International Feature Film every year since the award was created in 1956. The award is presented annually by the Academy to a feature-length motion picture produced outside the United States that contains primarily non-English dialogue. The International Feature Film Award Committee oversees the process and reviews all the submitted films. The category was previously called the Best Foreign Language Film, but this was changed in April 2019 to Best International Feature Film, after the Academy deemed the word "Foreign" to be outdated.

For the 97th Academy Awards, the submitted motion pictures must have first been released theatrically in their respective countries between 1 November 2023 and 30 September 2024. The deadline for submissions to the Academy was 2 October 2024. 89 countries submitted films, and 85 were found to be eligible by AMPAS and screened for voters. Tajikistan resubmitted its film disqualified from last year's list. After the 15-film shortlist was announced on 17 December 2024, the five nominees were announced on 23 January 2025. For the first time, two films nominated for International Feature were also nominated for Best Picture, I'm Still Here (Brazil) and Emilia Pérez (France), with the latter receiving 13 nominations, rendering it the most-nominated non-English language film of all time.

Brazil won the award for the first time with I'm Still Here by Walter Salles, which was also nominated for Best Picture and Best Actress (Fernanda Torres).

== Submissions ==
Submitting country	Film title used in nomination	Original title	Language(s)	Director(s)	Result
Albania	Waterdrop	Pikë uji	Albanian, Italian	Robert Budina	Not nominated
Algeria	Algiers	196 متر	Arabic, French	Chakib Taleb-Bendiab	Not nominated
Argentina	Kill the Jockey	El jockey	Spanish	Luis Ortega	Not nominated
Armenia	Yasha and Leonid Brezhnev	Յաշան և Լեոնիդ Բրեժնևը	Armenian, Russian	Edgar Baghdasaryan	Not nominated
Austria	The Devil's Bath	Des Teufels Bad	Styrian	Veronika Franz and Severin Fiala	Not nominated
Bangladesh	The Wrestler	বলী	Bengali, Chittagonian	Iqbal Hossain Chowdhury	Not nominated
Belgium	Julie Keeps Quiet	Julie zwijgt	Dutch, Flemish, French	Leonardo Van Dijl	Not nominated
Bolivia	Own Hand	Mano propia	Spanish	Gory Patiño	Not nominated
Bosnia and Herzegovina	My Late Summer	Nakon ljeta	Croatian, Bosnian	Danis Tanović	Not nominated
Brazil	I'm Still Here	Ainda Estou Aqui	Brazilian Portuguese	Walter Salles	Won Academy Award
Bulgaria	Triumph	Триумф	Bulgarian	Kristina Grozeva and Petar Valchanov	Not nominated
Cambodia	Meeting with Pol Pot	Rendez-vous avec Pol Pot / ណាត់ជួបជាមួយ ប៉ុល ពត	French, Khmer	Rithy Panh	Not nominated
Cameroon	Kismet		Cameroonian Pidgin English	Ngang Romanus Ntseh	Not nominated
Canada	Universal Language	Une langue universelle / آواز بوقلمون	French, Persian	Matthew Rankin	Made shortlist
Chile	In Her Place	El lugar de la otra	Spanish	Maite Alberdi	Not nominated
China	The Sinking of the Lisbon Maru	里斯本丸沉没	English, Wu, Mandarin, Japanese	Fang Li	Disqualified
Colombia	La suprema		Spanish	Felipe Holguín	Not nominated
Costa Rica	Memories of a Burning Body	Memorias de un cuerpo que arde	Spanish	Antonella Sudasassi	Not nominated
Croatia	Beautiful Evening, Beautiful Day	Lijepa večer, lijep dan	Croatian	Ivona Juka	Not nominated
Czech Republic	Waves	Vlny	Czech, Slovak, French, Italian, Russian	Jiří Mádl	Made shortlist
Denmark	The Girl with the Needle	Pigen med nålen	Danish	Magnus von Horn	Nominated
Dominican Republic	Aire: Just Breathe	Aire	Spanish	Leticia Tonos	Not nominated
Ecuador	Behind the Mist	Al otro lado de la niebla	Spanish, English, Nepali	Sebastián Cordero	Not nominated
Egypt	Flight 404	404 الرحلة	Arabic	Hani Khalifa	Not nominated
Estonia	8 Views of Lake Biwa	Biwa järve 8 nägu	Estonian, Russian, Finnish	Marko Raat	Not nominated
Finland	Family Time	Mummola	Finnish	Tia Kouvo	Not nominated
France	Emilia Pérez		Spanish, English	Jacques Audiard	Nominated
Georgia	The Antique	ანტიკვარიატი	Georgian, Russian, English	Rusudan Glurjidze	Not nominated
Germany	The Seed of the Sacred Fig	دانه‌ی انجیر معابد	Persian	Mohammad Rasoulof	Nominated
Greece	Murderess	Φόνισσα	Greek	Eva Nathena	Not nominated
Guatemala	Rita		Spanish	Jayro Bustamante	Not nominated
Haiti	Kidnapping Inc.		Haitian Creole, French, Spanish, English	Bruno Mourral	Not on the final list
Hong Kong	Twilight of the Warriors: Walled In	九龍城寨之圍城	Cantonese, Teochew Min, Japanese	Soi Cheang	Not nominated
Hungary	Semmelweis		Hungarian	Lajos Koltai	Not nominated
Iceland	Touch	Snerting	English, Japanese, Icelandic	Baltasar Kormákur	Made shortlist
India	Lost Ladies	लापता लेडीज़	Hindi	Kiran Rao	Not nominated
Indonesia	Women from Rote Island	Perempuan Berkelamin Darah	Bilba	Jeremias Nyangoen	Not nominated
Iran	In the Arms of the Tree	در آغوش درخت	Persian	Babak Lotfi Khajepasha	Not nominated
Iraq	Baghdad Messi	ميسي بغداد	Arabic, Central Kurdish	Sahim Omar Kalifa	Not nominated
Ireland	Kneecap		Ulster Irish, English	Rich Peppiatt	Made shortlist
Israel	Come Closer	קרוב אלי	Hebrew	Tom Nesher	Not nominated
Italy	Vermiglio		Solandro Ladin, Italian	Maura Delpero	Made shortlist
Japan	Cloud	クラウド	Japanese	Kurosawa Kiyoshi	Not nominated
Jordan	My Sweet Land	حلوة يا أرضي / Տունս քաղցր ա	Karabakh Armenian	Sareen Hairabedian	Withdrawn
Kazakhstan	Bauryna Salu	Баурына салу	Kazakh	Askhat Kuchencherekov	Not nominated
Kenya	Nawi		Swahili, English	Vallentine Chelluget, Apuu Mourine, and Kevin and Toby Schmutzler	Not nominated
Kyrgyzstan	Paradise at Mother's Feet	Бейиш - эненин таманында	Kyrgyz, Arabic, Azerbaijani, Kazakh, Russian, Turkish, Uzbek	Ruslan Akun	Not nominated
Latvia	Flow	Straume	No dialogue	Gints Zilbalodis	Nominated
Lebanon	Arzé	أرزة	Arabic	Mira Shaib	Not nominated
Lithuania	Drowning Dry	Sesės	Lithuanian	Laurynas Bareiša	Not nominated
Malaysia	Abang Adik	富都青年	Mandarin, Cantonese, Malay, Malaysian Sign Language, English	Jin Ong	Not nominated
Malta	Castillo		Maltese	Abigail Mallia	Not nominated
Mexico	Sujo		Spanish	Astrid Rondero and Fernanda Valadez	Not nominated
Mongolia	If Only I Could Hibernate	Баавгай болохсон	Mongolian	Zoljargal Purevdash	Not nominated
Montenegro	Supermarket		Montenegrin	Nemanja Bečanović	Not nominated
Morocco	Everybody Loves Touda	الجميع يحب تودة	Arabic, Moroccan Sign Language	Nabil Ayouch	Not nominated
Nepal	Shambhala	शम्भाला	Dolpo, Nepali	Min Bahadur Bham	Not nominated
Netherlands	Memory Lane	De terugreis	Dutch, French, English, Spanish	Jelle de Jonge	Not nominated
Nigeria	Mai Martaba		Hausa	Prince Daniel Aboki	Not nominated
Norway	Armand		Norwegian	Halfdan Ullmann Tøndel	Made shortlist
Pakistan	The Glassworker	شیشہ گر,	Urdu, English	Usman Riaz	Not nominated
Palestine	From Ground Zero	قصص غير محكية من غزة من المسافة صفر	Arabic	Nidaa Abu Hasna, Bashar al-Balbisi, Aws al-Banna, Ahmed al-Danf, Basil Al-Maqousi, Mustafa al-Nabih, Muhammad al-Shareef, Islam al-Zrieai, Ala Ayob, Alaa Damo, Awad Hana, Ahmed Hassouna, Mustafa Kallab, Satoum Kareem, Mahdi Karera, Rabab Khamees, Khamees Masharawi, Wissam Moussa, Tamer Najm, Damo Nidal, Mahmoud Reema, and Etimad Weshah	Made shortlist
Panama	Wake Up Mom	Despierta mamá	Spanish	Arianne Benedetti	Not nominated
Paraguay	The Last Ones	Los últimos	Spanish, Guarani	Sebastián Peña Escobar	Not nominated
Peru	Yana-Wara		Aymara	Óscar and Tito Catacora	Not nominated
Philippines	And So It Begins		Filipino, English	Ramona S. Diaz	Not nominated
Poland	Under the Volcano	Pod wulkanem	Ukrainian, Spanish, English, Russian, German, Wolof	Damian Kocur	Not nominated
Portugal	Grand Tour		Portuguese, Burmese, Vietnamese, English, Mandarin, Thai, French, Spanish, Japanese, Filipino	Miguel Gomes	Not nominated
Romania	Three Kilometres to the End of the World	Trei kilometri pâna la capatul lumii	Romanian	Emanuel Pârvu	Not nominated
Senegal	Dahomey		French, Fon, English	Mati Diop	Made shortlist
Serbia	Russian Consul	Руски конзул	Serbian, Albanian	Miroslav Lekić	Not nominated
Singapore	La Luna		Malay	M. Raihan Halim	Not nominated
Slovakia	The Hungarian Dressmaker	Ema a smrtihlav	Slovak, German, Hungarian, Czech	Iveta Grófová	Not nominated
Slovenia	Family Therapy	Odrešitev za začetnike	Slovene, English, French	Sonja Prosenc	Not nominated
South Africa	Old Righteous Blues		Afrikaans	Muneera Sallies	Not nominated
South Korea	12.12: The Day	서울의 봄	Korean, English	Kim Sung-su	Not nominated
Spain	Saturn Return	Segundo premio	Spanish, English	Isaki Lacuesta and Pol Rodríguez	Not nominated
Sweden	The Last Journey	Den sista resan	Swedish, French, English	Filip Hammar and Fredrik Wikingsson	Not nominated
Switzerland	Queens	Reinas	Spanish, Ayacucho Quechua	Klaudia Reynicke	Not nominated
Taiwan	Old Fox	老狐狸	Mandarin, Taiwanese Hokkien, Japanese	Hsiao Ya-chuan	Not nominated
Tajikistan	Melody	ملودی / Мелодия	Persian, Tajik	Behrouz Sebt Rasoul	Not nominated
Thailand	How to Make Millions Before Grandma Dies	หลานม่า	Thai, Teochew Min	Pat Boonnitipat	Made shortlist
Tunisia	Take My Breath	المباين	Arabic	Nada Mezni Hafaiedh	Not nominated
Turkey	Life	Hayat	Turkish	Zeki Demirkubuz	Not nominated
Ukraine	La Palisiada	Ля Палісіада	Ukrainian, Azerbaijani, Russian, Carpathian Romani	Philip Sotnychenko	Not nominated
United Kingdom	Santosh		Hindi	Sandhya Suri	Made shortlist
Uruguay	The Door Is There	Hay una puerta ahí	Spanish	Facundo and Juan Ponce de León	Withdrawn
Venezuela	Back to Life	Vuelve a la vida	Spanish, English	Luis Carlos and Alfredo Hueck	Not nominated
Vietnam	Peach Blossom, Pho and Piano	Đào, phở và piano	Vietnamese, French	Phi Tiến Sơn	Not nominated

== Notes ==
- China submitted The Sinking of the Lisbon Maru by Fang Li, but it was disqualified by the Academy because more than 50% of its dialogue was in English.
- Greece's selection process was highly controversial, beginning when the initial selection committee was replaced by the Greek Culture Ministry in August 2024. The ministry denied any members had been officially chosen and blamed an overzealous internal employee for the mix-up. In protest, all but one of the more than 20 films submitted for consideration were withdrawn by their filmmakers and a few members of the newly formed committee resigned. The Greek Culture Ministry said, despite the resignations, a quorum for voting was met, and Murderess, the only film not withdrawn from consideration, would be the Greek submission.
- Haiti reportedly submitted Kidnapping Inc. by Bruno Mourral, but it did not appear on the final list of films sent to Academy voters. It was submitted the following year for the 98th Academy Awards.
- Iran's government-controlled Farabi Cinema Foundation submitted In the Arms of the Tree by Babak Lotfi Khajepasha. In a statement, the dissident Iranian Independent Filmmaker Association (IIFMA) questioned why "a state-controlled entity known for censorship and repression, is still permitted to select the representative of Iranian cinema for the Oscars." They asked the Academy to reconsider partnering with Farabi because "filmmakers face severe repercussions, including imprisonment and bans, for not aligning with the regime's propaganda." Iranian independent filmmaker Mohammad Rasoulof was among those affected. He fled a prison sentence in Iran earlier in 2024 to live in exile in Germany, where his Iranian-set film The Seed of the Sacred Fig was chosen as the German Oscar submission.
- Jordan initially submitted My Sweet Land by Sareen Hairabedian, but later withdrew its submission due to diplomatic pressures from Azerbaijan.
- Uruguay selected The Door Is There by Facundo Ponce de León and Juan Ponce de León, but the film was voluntarily withdrawn by the Agencia del Cine y el Audiovisual del Uruguay (ACAU) prior to the official AMPAS announcement to avoid the appearance of a conflict of interest. At the time, Facundo Ponce de León was President of the ACAU.
- Venezuela's selection committee originally submitted Children of Las Brisas by Marianela Maldonado. The Academy ruled the film ineligible because it was shown on a streaming platform prior to its release in theaters. Back to Life by Luis Carlos Hueck and Alfredo Hueck was submitted in its place.
- The Oscar selection committee for Australia invited filmmakers to make submissions, but did not end up sending a film. Bhutan, Luxembourg and North Macedonia asked for submissions, but announced they had no films eligible for entry.
