= List of Nigerian submissions for the Academy Award for Best International Feature Film =

Nigerian films

Best International Feature Film submissions from Nigeria

Highlights
- Debut: 2019
- Submissions: 5
- Nominations: none
- Oscar winners: none

Nigeria submitted a film for the Academy Award for Best International Feature Film (Note: The category was previously named the Academy Award for Best Foreign Language Film, but this was changed to the Academy Award for Best International Feature Film in April 2019, after the Academy deemed the word "Foreign" to be outdated.) for the first time in 2019. The award is handed out annually by the United States Academy of Motion Picture Arts and Sciences to a feature-length motion picture produced outside the United States that contains primarily non-English dialogue. It was not created until the 1956 Academy Awards, in which a competitive Academy Award of Merit, known as the Best Foreign Language Film Award, was created for non-English speaking films, and has been given annually since.

As of 2026, Nigeria has submitted five films, but none of them were nominated.

== Submissions ==
The Academy of Motion Picture Arts and Sciences has invited the film industries of various countries to submit their best film for the Academy Award for Best International Feature Film since 1956. The International Feature Film Committee oversees the process and reviews all the submitted films. Following this, they vote via secret ballot to determine the five nominees for the award. Below is a list of the films that have been submitted by Nigeria for review by the Academy for the award by year and the respective Academy Awards ceremony.

The country first submission, Lionheart (2019), was disqualified as the majority of the film's dialogue was in English. However, the following year, the Nigerian Selection Committee announced that AMPAS would allow films that are primarily in Pidgin English to be eligible for submission.

In 2022, Nigeria's Selection Committee announced they received three Yoruba-language submissions: Aníkúlápó, Elesin Oba, The King's Horseman and King of Thieves. They determined they would not enter because a majority of the selection committee voted that all three films were "non-eligible."

Below is a list of the films that have been submitted by Nigeria for review by the Academy for the award by year and the respective Academy Awards ceremony.

Year (Ceremony)	Film title used in nomination	Language(s)	Director	Result
2019 (92nd)	Lionheart	English, Igbo	Genevieve Nnaji	Disqualified
2020 (93rd)	The Milkmaid	Hausa	Desmond Ovbiagele	Not nominated
2023 (96th)	Mami Wata	West African Pidgin English	C.J. Obasi	Not nominated
2024 (97th)	Mai Martaba	Hausa	Prince Daniel Aboki	Not nominated
2026 (99th)	Dear Ajayi	Nigerian Pidgin, Igbo, Yoruba	Damilola Orimogunje	Pending

== See also ==
- List of Academy Award winners and nominees for Best International Feature Film
- List of Academy Award-winning foreign language films
