= Back to Life (2023 film) =

Vuelve a la vida
- Theatrical release poster
- Directed by: Luis Carlos Hueck; Alfredo Hueck
- Written by: Luis Carlos Hueck; Alfredo Hueck
- Produced by: Paolo Merlini
- Starring: José Ramón Barreto; José Roberto Díaz; Crisol Carabal
- Cinematography: Clever Castillo
- Edited by: Alfredo Hueck
- Music by: Axel Berasain
- Release date: December 14, 2023 (Venezuela)
- Countries: Venezuela; United States
- Languages: Spanish; English

Back to Life (Spanish: Vuelve a la vida) is a 2023 comedy-drama film written and directed by Luis Carlos Hueck and Alfredo Hueck. It tells the story of Ricardo, a young man who develops a fatal illness and fights against it with the help of his family. The main cast includes José Ramón Barreto, José Roberto Díaz, Crisol Carabal, Eulalia Siso, and Shakti Maal. It premiered on 14 December 2023. It was selected as the Venezuelan entry for the Best International Feature Film at the 97th Academy Awards, but was not nominated.

== Plot ==
In 1996, Ricardo returns to Caracas after a yearlong exchange in New York. While he's visiting his friends during vacation on the coast of Venezuela, Ricardo suffers a sudden pain that will change his life and relationship with his family forever.

== Cast ==
- Jose Roberto Díaz as Puchi
- José Ramón Barreto as Ricardo
- Crisol Carabal as Patty
- Eulalia Siso as the Medic
- Shakti Maal as the Girlfriend
- Fernando Azpurua as Arturo
- Emilio Lovera as radio player

== Production ==
As stated by Luis Carlos Hueck, after the success of Papita, Maní, Tostón, him and his brother Alfredo wanted to tell a personal story.

The film was shot in Caracas between March and November 2016. Additional scenes were filmed in Los Roques. The COVID-19 pandemic delayed the post-production for at least half a year.

The movie tells a personal chapter in the life of Luis Carlos Hueck.

Vuelva a la vida won a special recognition in the Venezuelan Film Hub association.

In the middle of 2019, the Hueck brothers traveled to Cancún for an international meeting with producers to create an idea for a TV Series based on the film.

== Reception ==
The film was part of the 2023 Guadalajara Film Festival, where it was chosen among its seven best films.

== See also ==
- List of submissions to the 97th Academy Awards for Best International Feature Film
- List of Venezuelan submissions for the Academy Award for Best International Feature Film
