= 2024 El Gouna Film Festival =

Film festival in El Gouna, Egypt

7th El Gouna Film Festival
- Location: El Gouna, Egypt
- Founded: 2017
- Awards: El Gouna Gold Star for a Narrative Film
- Hosted by: El Gouna Convention and Culture Centre
- Artistic director: Marianne Khoury
- Festival date: Opening: 24 October 2024; Closing: 1 November 2024
- Website: elgounafilmfestival.com

The seventh edition of the El Gouna Film Festival took place from October 24 to November 1 in El Gouna, Egypt., held at the El Gouna Convention and Culture Centre.

== Official sections ==
=== Feature Narrative Competition ===
The following films were selected to compete for El Gouna Golden Star for Narrative Film Prize:

English Title	Director(s)	Production Country
Algiers	Chakib Taleb-Bendiab	Algeria, Tunisia, France, Canada
Crickets, It's Your Turn	Olga Korotko	France, Kazakhstan
Everybody Loves Touda	Nabil Ayouch	France, Morocco, Belgium, Denmark, Netherlands, Norway
Ghost Trail	Jonathan Millet	France, Germany, Belgium
Girls Will Be Girls	Shuchi Talati	India, France, Norway, USA
My Everything	Anne-Sophie Bailly	France
On Falling	Laura Carreira	UK, Portugal
Salve Maria	Mar Coll	Spain
Stranger	Zhengfan Yang	China
The Inevitable Journey to find a Wedding Dress	Jaylan Auf	Egypt
Thank You for Banking with Us	Laila Abbas	Palestine, Germany, Egypt, Qatar, Saudi Arabia
The Kingdom	Julien Colonna	France
Tiny Lights	Beata Parkanová	Czech Republic, Slovakia
Toxic	Saule Bliuvaite	Lithuania
Who Do I Belong To	Meryam Joobeur	Tunisia, France, Canada

=== Feature documentary ===
The following films were selected to be compete for El Gouna Golden Star for Documentary Film:

English Title	Director(s)	Production Country
A New Kind Of Wilderness	Silje Evensmo Jacobsen	Norway
Cilama	Hady Zaccak	Lebanon, Qatar
Death Without Mercy	Waad Al-Kateab	UK
Elementary	Claire Simon	France
Mistress Dispeller	Elizabeth Lo	China, UK
Thakerati Maleaa Bel Ashbah	Anas Zawahri	Syria
Soundtrack to a Coup d'Etat	Johan Grimonprez	Belgium, France, Netherlands
Tata	Radu Ciorniciuc, Lina Vdovii	Romania
Tell Them About Us	Rand Beiruty	Jordan, Saudi Arabia, Germany
The Brink of Dreams	Ayman El Amir, Nada Riyadh	Country
The Miraculous Transformation of the Working Class Into Foreigners	Samir	Switzerland, Italy
We Are Inside	Farah Kassem	Lebanon, Qatar, Denmark

== CineGouna funding ==
CineGouna funding
English Title	Director(s)	Production Country
Projects in Development
The Gardian	Muhannad Lamin	TBA
House No. 7	Rama Abdy	TBA
Running With Beasts	Leila Basma	TBA
Amara	Michelle Keserwany	TBA
Al Madeeneh 2008	Youssef Assabahi	TBA
Leila's Trial	Charlie Kouka	TBA
Elsewhere	Issraa ElKogali	TBA
Remind Me to Forget	Lama Jamjoom	TBA
Dwellers of The Cabins	Hend Bakr	TBA
A Pair of Shoes in The Dark Corner of The Moon	Ayman El Amir	TBA
The Cow Thief	Mohamed Zedan	TBA
The Masters of Magic and Beauty	Jad Chahine	TBA
The Myth of Mahmoud	Mayar Hamdan, Shaima Al Tamimi	TBA
Projects in Post Production
Exile	Mehdi Hmili	TBA
Life After Siham	Namir Abdel Messeeh	TBA
In The Darkness I See You	Nadim Tabet	TBA
My Father and Qaddafi	Jihan	TBA
Son of The Streets	Mohammed Almughanni	TBA
The Settlement	Mohamed Rashad	TBA
Those Who Watch Over	Karima Saidi	TBA
The Meursault Investigation	Malek Bensmail	TBA

== CineGouna Shorts ==
CineGouna Shorts
English Title	Director(s)	Producer
The Last Performance	Abanoub Nabil	Rouba Atiyeh
The Bar Girl	Yassir Naeim	Doaa Saber
The Last Request	Hozifa Abdelhalim	Noura Abdelrahman
Yellow	Sherouk Helal	Ahmed El Shebiny
In Such Moment, We Cry	Ahmed Sobhy	Marwa Tammam
A Little "Rosy" Journey	Ahmed El-Hawarey	Hala Lotfy
Dead Tired	Beshoy Youssef	Ramy El Gabry
Lemon Trees	Mariam Nasser	Mohamed Gaber
