= Vermiglio (film) =

2024 film by Maura Delpero

- International release poster
- Directed by: Maura Delpero
- Written by: Maura Delpero
- Produced by: Francesca Andreoli; Maura Delpero; Santiago Fondevila; Leonardo Guerra Seràgnoli
- Starring: Tommaso Ragno; Giuseppe De Domenico; Roberta Rovelli; Martina Scrinzi; Orietta Notari; Carlotta Gamba; Santiago Fondevila Sancet; Sara Serraiocco
- Cinematography: Mikhail Krichman
- Edited by: Gian Luca Mattei
- Production companies: Cinedora; Charades; Versus Production; Rai Cinema
- Distributed by: Lucky Red (Italy)
- Release date: September 2, 2024 (Venice)
- Running time: 119 minutes
- Countries: Italy; France; Belgium
- Languages: Ladin; Italian
- Box office: $4 million

Vermiglio , also known as The Mountain Bride, is a 2024 drama film written, co-produced and directed by Maura Delpero. The film premiered at the 81st Venice International Film Festival, where it won the Grand Jury Prize. It was selected as the Italian entry for Best International Feature Film at the 97th Academy Awards. It received 14 nominations at the 70th David di Donatello, and won 7 awards, including Best Film.

== Plot ==
In the late winter of 1944, as the war in Europe has decidedly turned in the allies favour against the axis of Germany and Italy, two Italian soldiers on the retreat, Attilio and Pietro, seek refuge in Attilio's remote Italian alpine home village of Vermiglio. Pietro, a Sicilian, had saved the life of the eternally grateful Attilio, and stays on with him in the village as a deserter. The two men sleep in the cowshed of Attilio’s widowed mother, although some resent Pietro’s presence in the village.

The village has a one-room school, run by a stern teacher, Cesare, who happens to be Attilio's uncle. Cesare and his wife Adele have just had their 9th child, but the baby boy soon dies, as had a previous child.

Adele is soon pregnant again. Her own pregnancy forms a background arc against which the subsequent tragedy unfolds.

Lucia — their eldest daughter — is the beauty of the village. She falls for the illiterate Pietro and asks him if they can be engaged: he hesitates briefly but says yes. She then allows him to have sex with her. He later asks Cesare for her hand, and her mother, while re-working an old dress for Lucia to wear at the wedding realises that Lucia is already pregnant.

Various subplots revolve around the school, Catholic traditions, Lucia's siblings and the difficulties Adele faces trying to raise and feed a large family with little money or support from the patriarch Cesare. The eldest boy, Dino, is belittled by his father Cesare, while Cesare dotes on his youngest daughter, the clever Flavia who is bound for boarding school. Conversely, Adele seems to ignore Flavia and defends Dino. Plain Ada, a classic middle child between pretty Lucia and clever Flavia, is close friends with, and possibly has a crush on, an even poorer older village girl who is known as a tearaway. Adolescence in the cramped house where the children share beds presents its challenges with private conversations being played out in earshot of all. The middle sister Ada has a strong moral compass but struggles to reconcile her spiritual search with her adolescent sexual desires. Hiding behind a wardrobe door to masturbate she believes she must make good through penance after doing this, and soils her face in the shed where the animals are kept.

Winter turns to spring and once news of the end of the war finally arrives in the village, Pietro returns to Sicily with the aim of letting his loved ones know he has survived, promising Lucia he will write and return soon. However, after weeks go by with no word from him, Lucia writes to the parish priest of his village, but before long the family learns from the newspaper that Pietro was already married to a Sicilian woman and has been shot by her using his own rifle. His first wife’s defence is that she was defending her own honour, and she is sentenced to 7 years in prison.

Her aunt and mother despair of Lucia, and of what will become of her. Cesare is somewhat shunned in the village when he had previously been esteemed.

Lucia gives birth to a girl, Antonia. Pietro's death had devastated Lucia, who fell into a mute silence, sleeping and even giving birth in the barn. She rejects the child, refusing to breastfeed, and attempts suicide, from which her brother Dino saves her showing more paternal instinct than their father. Leaving the baby in the care of her mother, Lucia abruptly makes her own long way to Sicily to where she has a close encounter with Pietro's first wife who is allowed out of prison one hour a day for exercise. This episode is dreamlike and the final credits suggest that this may be the case but whether real or imagined, it makes Lucia see her situation more clearly.

Baby Antonia is placed in an orphanage, where her aunt Ada, who has since taken holy vows, now lives and keeps an eye on the baby girl. Lucia visits her and finally bonds with her child. As an aside, Ada, typically, is a nun somewhat on her own terms (her tearaway friend has emigrated).

Finally, Lucia, as advised earlier by her aunt, goes to the city to work for a wealthy family.

== Cast ==
- Giuseppe De Domenico as Pietro Riso
- Tommaso Ragno as Cesare Graziadei
- Martina Scrinzi as Lucia Graziadei
- Roberta Rovelli as Adele
- Carlotta Gamba as Virginia
- Orietta Notari as Zia Cesira
- Sara Serraiocco as Anna Pennisi

== Production ==
Principal photography started on 28 August 2023, and shooting wrapped in December. The film was shot between the Vermiglio, Carciato and Comasine towns in the Trentino-Alto Adige region. It is produced by Cinedora (Italy), Charades (France), and Versus (Belgium). Delpero decided to make the film after her father's death as a way to help ensure that the traditions in which she had grown up were not lost, including conducting many interviews with local people during pre-production.

== Release ==
The film world-premiered in competition at the 81st Venice International Film Festival. It made its North American premiere at the 49th Toronto International Film Festival.

It was featured in the Limelight section of the 54th International Film Festival Rotterdam to be screened in February 2025.

== Reception ==
=== Critical response ===
The film received general positive reviews by critics. On the review aggregator website Rotten Tomatoes, 93% of 72 critics' reviews are positive, with an average rating of 8.1/10. The website's consensus reads: "Painterly and patient, Vermiglio carefully observes its provincial milieu to such absorbing effect that audiences will feel like they've become a part of the community." Metacritic, which uses a weighted average, assigned the film a score of 85 out of 100, based on 16 critics, indicating "universal acclaim".

Jessica Kiang of Variety affirmed that "economy" is the watchword of "deceptively formalist" film, that results from "deceptively formalist" direction, editing, musical compositions to costumes, contributing "to a fascinating narrative remove, which is belied by the close-up clarity of the imagery". Kiang wrote that although the plot is set in the past, it "operates like a future family secret playing out in the present tense" through " the spirit of the mothers and the sisters and the daughters who came before and after, and who trusted the imperious mountains to keep their secrets".

==== Italian critics ====
The film received favorable reviews from Italian film critics. Mattia Pasquini of Ciak wrote that like the previous film Maternal the screenplay is about the mother-child relationship set on an "extremely refined framework, both linguistically, stylistically and narratively coherent and homogeneous". Federico Pontiggia of Cinematografo stated that the film draws on "[Delpero's] prior documentary experience with greater ambition, free will and calmness," observing that "the direction of actors is excellent, the anti-spectacle concept is cohesive and confident, the poetry of war and peace is marvelous. Here we have a consummate auteur: Maura Delpero."

=== Accolades ===
| Award | Year | Category | Recipient(s) | Result | Ref. |
|---|---|---|---|---|---|
| Venice Film Festival | 3 September 2024 | Golden Lion | Maura Delpero | Nominated | |
| Venice Film Festival | 3 September 2024 | Grand Jury Prize | Maura Delpero | Won | |
| Venice Film Festival | 3 September 2024 | Sorriso Diverso Venezia Award for Best Italian Film | Maura Delpero | Won | |
| Venice Film Festival | 3 September 2024 | NUOVOIMAIE Talent Award for Best New Young Actress | Martina Scrinzi | Won | |
| Venice Film Festival | 3 September 2024 | La Pellicola d'Oro Award for Best Chief Electrician | Kristian De Martiis | Won | |
| Chicago International Film Festival | 27 October 2024 | Gold Hugo | Vermiglio | Won | |
| Camerimage | 23 November 2024 | Golden Frog for Best Cinematography | Mikhail Krichman | Nominated | |
| Gotham Awards | 2 December 2024 | Best International Feature | Maura Delpero, Francesca Andreoli, Santiago Fondevila Sance, Leonardo Guerra Seràgnoli | Nominated | |
| European Film Awards | 7 December 2024 | European Film | Vermiglio | Nominated | |
| European Film Awards | 7 December 2024 | European Director | Maura Delpero | Nominated | |
| San Diego Film Critics Society | 9 December 2024 | Best Foreign Language Film | Vermiglio | Nominated | |
| Golden Globe Awards | 5 January 2025 | Best Motion Picture – Non-English Language | Vermiglio | Nominated | |
| Palm Springs International Film Festival | 12 January 2025 | FIPRESCI Prize - Best International Film Feature | Vermiglio | Nominated | |
| Palm Springs International Film Festival | 12 January 2025 | Best International Screenplay | Maura Delpero | Won | |
| David di Donatello | 7 May 2025 | Best Film | Vermiglio | Won | |
| David di Donatello | 7 May 2025 | Best Director | Maura Delpero | Won | |
| David di Donatello | 7 May 2025 | Best Original Screenplay | Maura Delpero | Won | |
| David di Donatello | 7 May 2025 | Best Producer | Francesca Andreoli, Leonardo Guerra Seràgnoli, Santiago Fondevila Sancet, Maura Delpero for Cinedora, with Rai Cinema - in collaboration with Charades, Versus | Won | |
| David di Donatello | 7 May 2025 | Best Actress | Martina Scrinzi | Nominated | |
| David di Donatello | 7 May 2025 | Best Actor | Tommaso Ragno | Nominated | |
| David di Donatello | 7 May 2025 | Best Casting | Maurilio Mangano and Stefania Rodà | Won | |
| David di Donatello | 7 May 2025 | Best Cinematography | Mikhail Krichman | Won | |
| David di Donatello | 7 May 2025 | Best Production Design | Pirra and Vito Giuseppe Zito, Sara Pergher | Nominated | |
| David di Donatello | 7 May 2025 | Best Costumes | Andrea Cavalletto | Nominated | |
| David di Donatello | 7 May 2025 | Best Make-up | Frédérique Foglia | Nominated | |
| David di Donatello | 7 May 2025 | Best Hairstyling | Tiziana Argiolas | Nominated | |
| David di Donatello | 7 May 2025 | Best Editing | Luca Mattei | Nominated | |
| David di Donatello | 7 May 2025 | Best Sound | Dana Farzanehpour, Hervé Guyader and Emmanuel de Boissieu | Won | |

== See also ==
- List of submissions to the 97th Academy Awards for Best International Feature Film
- List of Italian submissions for the Academy Award for Best International Feature Film
