= Caracas, Te Quiero Que Jode =

2013 Venezuelan film

The tagline reads: "There's never time for love in this city"

Caracas, te quiero que jode, or Caracas TQQJ, (English: Caracas, I fucking love you) is a 2013 Venezuelan anthology romance film. It premiered on 30 October 2013.

== Synopsis ==
In Filas de espera, the segment directed by Daniela Bascopé, a new couple have a silent argument as they try to work their way through packed offices, long queues, and red tape. The trailer for this segment was released by Hueck in 2010.

In Guárdame puesto, the segment directed by Alfredo Hueck, a couple's love is tested as they search Caracas for a parking spot. It stars Elías Muñoz and Bascopé. Hueck released the first trailer for his short as part of the project in 2009.

== Production ==
The film was inspired by the film Paris, je t'aime, with a similar collection of love stories being set in the Venezuelan capital Caracas. Unlike the "Cities of Love" franchise, the Caracas films also bring the contemporary issues of this city into the narratives, with the title playing on the different meanings of the word joder (roughly, "fuck").

The different directors intended for the film were Bascopé, Hueck, Román Chalbaud, Marcel Rasquin, Alexandra Henao, Gustavo Rondón (La familia), Luis Alberto Lamata (Jericho), Jackson Gutiérrez, Luis Carlos Hueck (Papita, maní, tostón), Hernán Jabes (Rock, Paper, Scissors), Emilio Lovera (Isla Presidencial), and Luis Rahamut. The director of documentary sequences intended to show Caracas between each segment was Sergio Monsalve.

The film's production was described in 2010 to be moving "little by little"; in this year it was searching for private financiers to help fund the completion of the segments, despite many of the best of Venezuela's directors being attached. In 2018, the Venezuelan production company Siete Filmes wrote an opinion piece for Medium about the climate of collaborative film production in the country, mentioning Caracas TQQJ; Siete Filmes thought it was a good idea, but that after production troubles the film as intended was not finished, with only a handful of the directors completing their segment before the film was released in 2013 as a collection of shorts.
