= 72nd Locarno Film Festival =

Film festival in Locarno, Switzerland

- Official poster of the 72nd Locarno Film Festival by Jannuzzi Smith.
- Opening film: Magari
- Closing film: To the Ends of the Earth
- Location: Locarno, Switzerland
- Founded: 1946
- Awards: Golden Leopard (Vitalina Varela)
- Festival date: 7–17 August 2019
- Website: Website

Locarno Film Festival chronology
- 73rd 71st

The 72nd annual Locarno Festival was held from 7 August to 17 August 2019. The debut feature by Italian director-producer Ginevra Elkann's Magari opened the festival, and Kiyoshi Kurosawa's To the Ends of the Earth was screened as closing film.

The Golden Leopard, the festival's top prize, was awarded to Vitalina Varela directed by Pedro Costa.

== Juries ==
=== International Competition ===
- Catherine Breillat, French filmmaker, novelist and professor - Jury President
- Ilse Hughan, Dutch producer
- Emiliano Morreale, Italian film critic
- Nahuel Pérez Biscayart, Argentinian actor
- Angela Schanelec, German filmmaker

=== Filmmakers of the Present ===
- Jake Perlin, American producer - Jury President
- Shengze Zhu, Chinese filmmaker and producer
- Yolande Zauberman, French filmmaker

=== Leopards of Tomorrow ===
- Bi Gan, Chinese filmmaker - Jury President
- Alice Diop, French filmmaker
- Mike Plante, American short films programmer at Sundance Film Festival

=== Moving Ahead ===
- Michael Boyce Gillespie, American film theorist and historian - Jury President
- Aline Schmid, Swiss producer
- Eduardo Williams, Argentinian filmmaker

=== Best First Feature Prizes ===
- Margherita Chiti, Italian distributor - Jury President
- Frédéric Jaeger, German artistic director of Berlin Critics’ Week
- Jacqueline Lyanga, American festival director

== Sections ==
=== Piazza Grande ===
| English Title | Original Title | Director(s) | Production Country |
|---|---|---|---|
| 7500 | | Patrick Vollrath | Germany, Austria |
| Adoration | | Fabrice Du Welz | Belgium, France |
| Camille | | Boris Lojkine | France |
| Days of the Bagnold Summer | | Simon Bird | United Kingdom |
| Diego Maradona | | Asif Kapadia | United Kingdom |
| Instinct | | Halina Reijn | Netherlands |
| The Girl with a Bracelet | La Fille au bracelet | Stéphane Demoustier | France, Belgium |
| A Letter to Freddy Buache | Lettre à Freddy Buache | Jean-Luc Godard | France |
| If Only (Opening Film) | Magari | Ginevra Elkann | Italy, France |
| New Acid | | Basim Magdy | France, Switzerland |
| Notre Dame | | Valérie Donzelli | France, Belgium |
| Once Upon a Time in Hollywood | | Quentin Tarantino | United States |
| To the Ends of the Earth (Closing Film) | Tabi no Owari Sekai no Hajimari | Kiyoshi Kurosawa | Japan, Uzbekistan, Qatar |

=== International Competition (Concorso internazionale) ===
| English Title | Original Title | Director(s) | Production Country |
|---|---|---|---|
| The Fever | A Febre | Maya Da-Rin | Brazil, France, Germany |
| Echo | Bergmål | Rúnar Rúnarsson | Iceland, France, Switzerland |
| Cat in the Wall | | Mina Mileva, Vesela Kazakova | Bulgaria, United Kingdom, France |
| A Voluntary Year | Das freiwillige Jahr | Ulrich Köhler, Henner Winckler | Germany |
| Douze Mille | | Nadège Trebal | France |
| During Revolution | Fi Al-Thawra | Maya Khoury | Syria, Sweden |
| The Science of Fictions | Hiruk-pikuk si al-kisah | Yosep Anggi Noen | Indonesia, Malaysia, France |
| Maternal | Hogar | Maura Delpero | Italy, Argentina |
| Isadora's Children | Les Enfants d'Isadora | Damien Manivel | France, South Korea |
| Endless Night | Longa noite | Eloy Enciso | Spain |
| O Fim do Mundo | | Basil Da Cunha | Switzerland |
| Height of the Wave | 파고 | Park Jung-bum | South Korea |
| Technoboss | | João Nicolau | Portugal, France |
| South Terminal | Terminal Sud | Rabah Ameur-Zaïmeche | France |
| The Last Black Man in San Francisco | | Joe Talbot | United States |
| Vitalina Varela | | Pedro Costa | Portugal |
| A Girl Missing | よこがお | Koji Fukada | Japan, France |

=== Filmmakers of the Present (Concorso Cineasti del presente) ===
| English Title | Original Title | Director(s) | Production Country |
|---|---|---|---|
| 143 Sahara Street | 143 rue du désert | Hassen Ferhani | Algeria, France, Qatar |
| Bird Island | L'Île aux oiseaux | Maya Kosa, Sergio da Costa | Switzerland |
| The Cold Raising The Cold | Lengmo weiyang lengmo | Rong Guang Rong | Italy |
| The Dove and the Wolf | La Paloma y el Lobo | Carlos Lenin | Mexico |
| Ham on Rye | | Tyler Taormina | United States |
| Here for Life | | Andrea Luka Zimmerman, Adrian Jackson | United Kingdom |
| Ivana the Terrible | Ivana cea Groaznica | Ivana Mladenović | Romania, Serbia |
| Love Me Tender | | Klaudia Reynicke | Switzerland |
| Mariam | | Sharipa Urazbayeva | Kazakhstan |
| Nafi's Father | Baamum Nafi | Mamadou Dia | Senegal |
| Oroslan | | Matjaž Ivanišin | Slovenia, Czech Republic |
| Overseas | | Yoon Sung-a | Belgique, France |
| Space Dogs | | Elsa Kremser, Levin Peter | Austria, Germany |
| The Tree House | Nhà Cây | Minh Quý Trương | Singapore, Vietnam, Germany, France, China |
| Wonders in the Suburbs | Merveilles à Montfermeil | Jeanne Balibar | France |
| The Young Observant | L'apprendistato | Davide Maldi | Italy |

=== Moving Ahead ===
| English Title | Original Title | Director(s) | Production Country |
|---|---|---|---|
| (tourism studies) | | Joshua Gen Solondz | United States |
| A Topography of Memory | | Burak Çevik | Turkey, Canada |
| Black Hole | | Emmanuel Grimaud, Arnaud Deshayes | France |
| Color-blind | | Ben Russell | France, Germany |
| Distancing | | Miko Revereza | United States |
| The Giverny Document (Single Channel) | | Ja'Tovia M. Gary | United States, France |
| In Memoriam | | Jean-Claude Rousseau | France |
| The Invisible Hand | | Omer Fast | China, Germany |
| Kasiterit | | Riar Rizaldi | Indonesia |
| Krabi, 2562 | | Ben Rivers, Anocha Suwichakornpong | United Kingdom, Thailand |
| Lore | | Sky Hopinka | United States |
| The Sun, the Sun Blinded Me | | Anka Sasnal, Wilhelm Sasnal | Poland, Switzerland |
| Osmosis | Shān Zhī Běi | Zhou Tao | China |
| Ralf's Colors | Ralfs Farben | Lukas Marxt | Austria, Germany, Spain, France |
| Swinguerra | | Bárbara Wagner, Benjamin de Burca | Brazil |
| Those That, at a Distance, Resemble Another | | Jessica Sarah Rinland | United Kingdom, Argentina, Spain |
| Un film dramatique | | Éric Baudelaire | France |

=== Leopards of Tomorrow (Pardi di domani) ===
==== International Competition (Concorso internazionale) ====
| English Title | Original Title | Director(s) | Production Country |
|---|---|---|---|
| 16 December | 16 de decembro | Alvaro Gago | Spain |
| A Street Under | Chão de Rua | Tomas von der Osten | Brazil |
| All Come From Dust | | Younes Ben Slimane | Tunisia |
| All the Fires the Fire | | Efthimis Kosemund Sanidis | Greece |
| The Animal | Tskhoveli | Amiran Dolidze | Georgia |
| Black Sun | Siyah güneş | Arda Çiltepe | Turkey, Germany |
| Cobalt Blue | ပြာပြာညိုရောင် မှိုင်းတလဲ့လဲ့ | Aung Phyoe | Myanmar |
| Companions of the Cave | Ahlou al kahef | Fakhri El Ghezal | Tunisia |
| Dossier of the Dossier | | Sorayos Prapapan | Thailand |
| Douma Underground | Douma that al ard | Tim Alsiofi | Lebanon, Syria |
| Enduring Body | Râang Ton Taan | Ukrit Sa-nguanhai | Thailand |
| Eyes on the Road | | Stefanie Kolk | Netherlands |
| Father | Vader | Isabel Lamberti | Netherlands |
| Flesh | Carne | Camila Kater | Brazil, Spain |
| The Furniture Maker | El hacedor de muebles | David Aviles | Cuba |
| How to Tell a True Immigrant Story | | Aggie Ebrahimi Bazaz | United States |
| In Vitro | | Larissa Sansour, Søren Lind | United Kingdom, Palestine, Denmark |
| The Last Image of Father | Poslednja slika o ocu | Stefan Djordjevic | Serbia |
| Leave of Absence | Otpusk | Anton Sazonov | Russia |
| Mom's Movie | | Stella Kyriakopoulos | Greece, Spain |
| Mthunzi | | Tebogo Malebogo | South Africa |
| Our Territory | Notre territoire | Mathieu Volpe | Belgium |
| Sheep, Wolf and a Cup of Tea... | Moutons, loup et tasse de thé... | Marion Lacourt | France |
| Shiver of Love | Frisson d'amour | Maxence Stamatiadis | France |
| Tide | Marée | Manon Coubia | Belgium, France |
| Umbilical | | Danski Tang | United States |
| Unfinished | Incompiuta | Samira Guadagnuolo, Tiziano Doria | Italy |
| Volcano: What Does a Lake Dream? | Vulcão: O Que Sonha um Lago? | Diana Vidrascu | France, Portugal, Romania |
| White Afro | | Akosua Adoma Owusu | Ghana, United States |

==== Swiss Competition (Concorso nazionale) ====
| English Title | Original Title | Director(s) | Production Country |
|---|---|---|---|
| A Summer Morning | Un matin d'été | Patrick Muroni | Switzerland |
| Aline | | Simon Guélat | Switzerland, France |
| All Cats Are Grey in the Dark | Nachts sind alle Katzen grau | Lasse Linder | Switzerland |
| At the Pool | À la piscine | Consuelo Frauenfelder, Stefan Lauper | Switzerland |
| Azure Memories | L'azzurro del cielo | Enea Zucchetti | Switzerland |
| Life is One of the Simplest | Das Leben ist eines der Leichtesten | Marion Nyffenegger | Switzerland |
| Mama Rosa | | Dejan Barac | Switzerland |
| Sas | | Léa Célestine Bernasconi | Switzerland |
| Still Working | | Julietta Korbel | Switzerland |
| Silent Storm | Tempête silencieuse | Anaïs Moog | Switzerland |
| Terminal | | Kim Allamand | Switzerland |

== Official Awards ==
The following awards were presented for films shown In Competition:

=== International Competition ===
- Golden Leopard: Vitalina Varela by Pedro Costa
- Special Jury Prize: Height of the Wave by Park Jung-bum
- Best Direction Award: Damien Manivel for Isadora's Children
- Best Actor Award: Regis Myrupu for The Fever
- Best Actress Award: Vitalina Varela for Vitalina Varela
- Special Mentions:
  - The Science of Fictions by Yosep Anggi Noen
  - Maternal by Maura Delpero
- Swatch First Feature Awards: Nafi's Father by Mamadou Dia

=== Filmmakers of the Present ===
- Golden Leopard - Filmmakers of the Present: Nafi's Father by Mamadou Dia
- Best Emerging Director: Hassen Ferhani for 143 sahara street
- Special Jury Prize: Ivana the Terrible by Ivana Mladenović
- Special Mention: Here for Life by Andrea Luka Zimmerman and Adrian Jackson

=== Moving Ahead ===
- Moving Ahead Award: The Giverny Document (Single Channel) by Ja'Tovia M. Gary
- Special Mentions:
  - Those That, at a Distance, Resemble Another by Jessica Sarah Rinland
  - Osmosis by Zhou Tao

=== Leopards of Tomorrow ===
- Pardino d'oro for the Best International Short Film – SRG SSR Prize: Black Sun by Arda Çiltepe
- Pardino d'oro for the Best Swiss Short Film – Swiss Life Prize: Mama Rosa by Dejan Barac
- Pardino d'argento SSR SRG for the international competition: Umbilical by Danski Tang
- Pardino d'argento Swiss Life for the national competition: Silent Storm by Anaïs Moog
- Pardi di domani Best Direction Prize: Anton Sazonov for Leave of Absence
