= Fatima Mohammed =

Nigerian filmmaker and actress

- Born: Fatima; November 24, 1999 (age 26); Maiduguri
- Citizenship: Nigerian
- Occupation: Actor
- Years active: present
- Known for: Princess Sangaya at Mai Martaba

Fatima Mohammed (aka Sangaya) is a Nigerian filmmaker and actor in the Kannywood movie industry.

== Early life ==
Fatima Mohammed was born on November 24, 1999 in Maiduguri, Borno State, Nigeria. She moved with her family to Abuja in Nigeria.

== Education ==
Fatima Mohammed had her primary and secondary education in Abuja, Nigeria but later went back to Borno State to write her Senior Secondary Certificate Examination (SSCE).

== Career ==
Fatima Mohammed started her acting career in the Kannywood movie industry in 2022, shortly after moving to Kano state from Borno state.

She has acted in over 20 films, some of which are:

- Mai Martaba – acted as Princess Sangaya
- Alaka
- Rudani,
- Matar So
- Ke Duniya
- Abokin Tafiya

== Awards nominated ==
- Nomination for Best Promising Up Coming Actress by the Africa Movie Academy Awards (AMAA)
