= 143 Sahara Street =

2019 Algerian-French documentary film

- Directed by: Hassen Ferhani
- Written by: Hassen Ferhani
- Produced by: Olivier Boischot; Narimane Mari
- Cinematography: Hassan Ferhani
- Edited by: Stéphanie Sicard; Nadia Ben Rachid; Nina Khada; Hassen Ferhani
- Production companies: An Allers Retours Films (Algeria); Centrale Électrique (France)
- Release date: 2019
- Running time: 104 minutes
- Countries: France, Algeria, Qatar
- Language: Algerian Arabic

143 Sahara Street (original title: 143 rue du désert) is a 2019 Algerian-French documentary film directed by Hassen Ferhani. It tells the story of a woman named Malika, who runs a small roadside restaurant in the Algerian Sahara Desert.

The film received critical acclaim upon its release, with many praising Ferhani's intimate and observational approach to storytelling. It premiered at the Locarno Film Festival and was selected to screen at several other international film festivals, including the Toronto International Film Festival.

== Reception ==
=== Critical reception ===
On the review aggregator website Rotten Tomatoes, the film holds an approval rating of 100% based on 12 reviews.

Variety's Jay Weissberg described 143 Sahara Street as a "loving portrait of a woman and her roadside teahouse". He noted that the film captures the expected images of the Sahara and highlights the beauty of the changing light and atmosphere throughout the day. Weissberg praised how Ferhani allows Malika to become a co-conspirator in the act of portraiture, rather than just a passive subject, and found the film to be more focused than Ferhani's debut.

The Hollywood Reporter's Boyd Van Hoeij gave a positive review of the documentary, noting that the slow-paced film gradually gets under the viewer's skin. He notes that the film is more gently observational and less obviously staged than Ferhani's debut. However, he also notes that Ferhani's presence occasionally becomes jarringly noticeable, citing "annoyingly wobbly" camerawork which breaks the "illusion of life just quietly continuing in static fixed tableaux".

Kiva Reardon stated that the documentary provides a nuanced narrative that is entirely driven by the character of the female proprietor and that it gives rise to “questions of modernization and the far reaches of capitalism”.

=== Awards and accolades ===
Hassan Ferhani received the Best Emerging Director award for 143 Sahara Street at the 72nd Locarno Film Festival.
