= Nina Khada =

Franco-Algerian film director, screenwriter and film editor

- Born: 1991 (age 34–35); Nancy, France
- Occupations: film director, screenwriter and film editor
- Writing career
- Notable works: movies Fatima (2015), I Bit My Tongue (2020) and Al Djanat (2023).

Nina Khada is a French born Franco-Algerian film director, screenwriter and film editor.

== Biography ==
Born in 1991 to Algerian parents in Nancy, France, Khada studied editing and broadcast journalism, and graduated with a Master's degree in documentary filmmaking from Aix-Marseille University in 2014.

== Filmography ==
Khada's films include:

Year	Film	Genre	Role	Duration (min)
2015	Fatima	Documentary short. Story of her grandmother's exile from Algeria to France, in color/black and white	Screenwriter and director	18 m
2019	143, rue du Désert / 143 Sahara Street by Hassen Ferhani	Documentary feature	Film editor	100 m
2020	Les Divas du Taguerabt by Karim Moussaoui	Fiction short	Film editor	16 m
2020	Je me suis mordue la langue / I Bit My Tongue	Documentary short. A young Algerian woman who was raised in France returns making a detour to Tunis.	Screenwriter and director	25 m
2023	Al Djanat, paradis originel / Al Djanat, the Original Paradise by Aïcha Chloé Boro	Fiction feature. Bambara and French spoken.	Film editor	84 m
2023	À l'intérieur by Claire Juge	Documentary feature	Film editor	56 m

== Awards ==
Khada's films obtained one prize and one nomination:

Film	Festival	Award
Fatima	Adana Film Festival	2016 Winner Golden Boll in Mediterranean Short Film, Best Short Documentary Film
I Bit My Tongue	Fribourg International Film Festival	2021 Nominee Best Short Film Award
