= Burkinabes in France =

Burkinabés in France
Burkinabè en France
- (Burkina Faso) (France)

Total population
- 5,300

Regions with significant populations
- Paris, Île-de-France, Marseille, Lyon, Bordeaux, Lille

Languages
- French (African French), Mooré, Dioula and other languages of Burkina Faso

Religion
- Predominantly Islam and Christianity; also traditional beliefs

The Burkinabé diaspora in France includes people born in Burkina Faso who later settled to the French Republic, as well as their descendants and individuals of Burkinabé origin with at least one parent holding Burkinabé nationality. This transcontinental migration represents one of the most significant Burkinabé communities outside Africa, largely due to shared cultural and historical links and the widespread use of French, reflecting the country's past as the colony of French Upper Volta until independence in 1960.

== History ==
Historical migration flows from Burkina Faso to the French Republic developed during the colonial and post-colonial periods. Under French rule, the territory of French Upper Volta was regarded as a major labor reserve within French West Africa, and colonial authorities organized and encouraged the movement of workers to other parts of the colonial empire, particularly within the region. Although most migration initially remained within West Africa, these mobility networks later facilitated movement toward Europe. After independence in 1960, migration patterns diversified as students, workers, and families increasingly settled in France, supported by established social networks, the continued use of the French language, and long-standing administrative and cultural ties.

Intercontinental migration to Western Europe became more visible in the late twentieth and early twenty-first centuries, as educational mobility, labor opportunities, and family reunification contributed to the growth of Burkinabé communities abroad.

== Sociocultural organizations and initiatives ==
Burkinabé associations in France emerged from student and labor migration beginning in the mid-twentieth century. Student organizations such as the Association des étudiants voltaïques en France existed from the 1950s, while worker migration increased after independence in 1960, with arrivals often transiting through West Africa. Community organizations later formed to provide mutual aid, cultural activities, and support for integration, including the Association des travailleurs burkinabè de Paris founded in 1982. Additional development-oriented groups appeared in subsequent decades, such as the Association pour le développement du Burkina Faso, created in 1974, reflecting growing community organization.

By the early twenty-first century, numerous local associations existed across France, particularly in the Paris region, Marseille, Bordeaux, Lille, and Lyon. To coordinate these initiatives, the Union des associations des Burkinabè en France was established in 2004 as a national federation linking regional groups while preserving their autonomy. These associations typically focused on mutual assistance, cultural preservation, and development projects in Burkina Faso, and some participated in national diaspora platforms such as the Forum des organisations de solidarité internationale issues des migrations, which supports migrant-led development initiatives.

In the Paris metropolitan area (Île-de-France), the Burkinabé diaspora forms part of the broader West African immigrant population, particularly within the department of Seine-Saint-Denis. Their presence is reflected in the cultural landscape of the area, especially through music and community-based events. The 2015 edition of the annual Africolor Festival, held across various municipalities in Seine-Saint-Denis, was dedicated to Burkina Faso, highlighting Burkinabé musical traditions and contemporary artists. This programming contributed to the visibility of Burkinabé cultural expression within both the diaspora and the wider French cultural scene.

In Burkina Faso, the radio program Allô diaspora, produced and broadcast by Radio Oméga in Ouagadougou, featured Burkinabé migrants living in multiple countries, including France, and contributed to maintaining transnational connections between communities abroad and their country of origin.

== Notable people ==
- Joseph Ki-Zerbo (1922–2005), historian, politician and writer
- Aïcha Boro (born 1978), film director and screenwriter
- Germain Sanou (born 1992), footballer

== See also ==
- Burkina Faso–France relations
- Black French people
