= List of 2013 box office number-one films in Venezuela =

This is a list of films which placed number one at the weekend box office for the year 2013.

== Number-one films ==
Papita, maní, tostón became the highest grossing film of 2013. But its reign at the #1 spot occurred in early 2014, it never reached #1 during 2013.

#	Date	Film	Gross	Notes
1	January 6, 2013	Wreck-It Ralph	$1,420,170	
2	January 13, 2013	Wreck-It Ralph	$976,102	
3	January 20, 2013	Wreck-It Ralph	$798,450	
4	January 27, 2013	Wreck-It Ralph	$645,370	
5	February 3, 2013	Wreck-It Ralph	$571,675	
6	February 10, 2013	Life of Pi	$676,521	
7	February 17, 2013	Life of Pi	$672,431	
8	February 24, 2013	Life of Pi	$489,946	
9	March 3, 2013	Life of Pi	$583,791	
10	March 10, 2013	Oz the Great and Powerful	$976,229	
11	March 17, 2013	Oz the Great and Powerful	$1,171,292	
12	March 24, 2013	The Croods	$1,151,301	
13	March 31, 2013	The Croods	$1,675,504	
14	April 7, 2013	The Croods	$1,027,583	
15	April 14, 2013	The Croods	$544,085	
16	April 21, 2013	Jack the Giant Slayer	$894,360	
17	April 28, 2013	Iron Man 3	$2,384,218	Iron Man 3 had the highest weekend debut of 2013.
18	May 5, 2013	Iron Man 3	$1,579,887	
19	May 12, 2013	Iron Man 3	$1,111,598	
20	May 19, 2013	Epic	$1,102,564	
21	May 26, 2013	Epic	$1,011,046	
22	June 2, 2013	Epic	$919,615	
23	June 9, 2013	After Earth	$582,688	
24	June 16, 2013	Man of Steel	$1,092,904	
25	June 23, 2013	Monsters University	$1,161,848	
26	June 30, 2013	Monsters University	$1,158,852	
27	July 7, 2013	Despicable Me 2	$1,461,451	
28	July 14, 2013	Despicable Me 2	$1,061,129	
29	July 21, 2013	Despicable Me 2	$1,074,146	
30	July 28, 2013	Despicable Me 2	$779,942	
31	August 4, 2013	The Smurfs 2	$1,105,074	
32	August 11, 2013	The Smurfs 2	$888,999	
33	August 18, 2013	Turbo	$925,852	
34	August 25, 2013	Turbo	$733,024	
35	September 1, 2013	The Wolverine	$631,874	
36	September 8, 2013	Planes	$641,367	
37	September 15, 2013	Planes	$418,315	
38	September 22, 2013	Planes	$421,809	
39	September 29, 2013	One Direction: This Is Us	$456,899	
40	October 6, 2013	The Conjuring	$358,009	
41	October 13, 2013	Dragon Ball Z: Battle of Gods	$404,399	
42	October 20, 2013	Percy Jackson: Sea of Monsters	$494,332	
43	October 27, 2013	Percy Jackson: Sea of Monsters	$431,594	
44	November 3, 2013	Gravity	$466,374	
45	November 10, 2013	Thor: The Dark World	$1,397,306	
46	November 17, 2013	Thor: The Dark World	$1,291,817	
47	November 24, 2013	Thor: The Dark World	$771,690	
48	December 1, 2013	Thor: The Dark World	$570,975	
49	December 8, 2013	Thor: The Dark World	$347,170	
50	December 15, 2013	Cloudy with a Chance of Meatballs 2	$797,328	
51	December 22, 2013	Frozen	$1,037,140	
52	December 29, 2013	Frozen	$1,249,616	

== Highest-grossing films ==
Highest-grossing films of 2013 in Venezuela
Rank	Title	Studio	Domestic Gross
1.	Papita, maní, tostón	Centro Nacional Autónomo de Cinematografía	$15,665,693
2.	Frozen	Walt Disney Pictures	$12,514,904
3.	Iron Man 3	Walt Disney Pictures / Marvel Studios	$12,442,756
4.	Despicable Me 2	Universal Pictures / Illumination Entertainment	$10,935,072
5.	Thor: The Dark World	Walt Disney Pictures / Marvel Studios	$9,147,580
6.	Monsters University	Walt Disney Pictures / Pixar Animation Studios	$8,724,100
7.	Fast & Furious 6	Universal Pictures	$8,140,168
8.	The Croods	20th Century Fox / DreamWorks Animation	$7,265,547
9.	Oz the Great and Powerful	Walt Disney Pictures	$6,555,618
10.	The Smurfs 2	Columbia Pictures / Sony Pictures Animation	$6,236,042

== See also ==
- List of American films — American films by year
