= Lee Seung-yeon (actress, born 1977) =

South Korean actress (born 1977)

- Born: January 21, 1977 (age 49); South Korea
- Occupation: Actress
- Years active: 2003–present

Korean name
- Hangul: 이승연
- Hanja: 李承姸
- RR: I Seungyeon
- MR: I Sŭngyŏn

Lee Seung-yeon (Korean: 이승연; born January 21, 1977) is a South Korean actress.

== Filmography ==
=== Film ===
| Year | Title | Role |
|---|---|---|
| 2003 | Summer in 1945 (short film) | |
| 2005 | Slowly (short film) | |
| 2005 | A Bowl of Tea (short film) | |
| 2006 | I Hazily Knew It (short film) | Lee Sun-joo |
| 2006 | My Boss, My Teacher | Teacher 3, third year class 8 |
| 2006 | Ad-lib Night | Kang Seon-hee |
| 2007 | Punch Lady | Female lecturer 2 |
| 2008 | My Dear Enemy | Woman at the race track |
| 2008 | Lovers (omnibus) | |
| 2008 | Romantic Island | Agent Kim |
| 2009 | Breathless | Hyeon-seo |
| 2009 | Maybe (Rabbit and Lizard) | young May's mother |
| 2009 | Potato Symphony | Nurse Kim |
| 2010 | Wedding Dress | So-ra's homeroom teacher |
| 2010 | Harmony | young Kim Moon-ok |
| 2010 | Vegetarian | Head nurse |
| 2010 | The Man Next Door | Girl with sausage |
| 2011 | Boy | Choon-ja |
| 2011 | Spy Papa | Red snake |
| 2012 | Pink | Soo-jin |
| 2012 | Still Strange | Young-seon |
| 2012 | Plump Revolution | Editor |
| 2012 | Touch | Jeong-won's mother |
| 2013 | Miracle in Cell No. 7 | Jang Min-hwan's wife |
| 2013 | Norigae | Kim Mi-hyun |
| 2014 | Breath (short film) | Su-in |
| 2014 | Late Spring | Teashop girl |
| 2015 | Alive | Su-yeon |
| 2016 | Worst Woman | Yoo-jin |
| 2017 | The Running Actress | Director's wife |
| 2018 | House of Hummingbird | Mother |
| 2019 | Height of the Wave | Yeon-soo |

=== Television ===
| Year | Title | Role | Network | Ref. |
|---|---|---|---|---|
| 2015 | Snowy Road | Yoon-ok | KBS1 | |
| 2020 | Eccentric! Chef Moon | Han Mi-young | Channel A | |

== Theater ==
| Year | Title | Role |
|---|---|---|
| | Sphinx | |
| | Faust | |
| | The Balcony | |
| | Gamoonjang | |
| | Hwan | |
| 2008 | Hamlet | Gertrude |
| 2008 | Port | Lucy Moore |
| 2012 | Fox's Alumni Association | Min-jeong |
| 2013 | Hello, Piano | Mi-jeong |
