= Height of the Wave =

2019 South Korean film by Park Jung-bum

- Promotional poster
- Hangul: 파고
- RR: Pago
- MR: P'ago
- Directed by: Park Jung-bum
- Written by: Kim Min-kyung
- Produced by: Oh Ji-yoon
- Starring: Lee Seung-yeon
- Cinematography: Park Jong-chul
- Edited by: Cho Hyun-joo
- Music by: Yang Jung-won
- Release dates: May 3, 2019 (JIFF, South Korea)
- Running time: 110 minutes
- Country: South Korea
- Language: Korean

Height of the Wave (Korean: 파고) is a 2019 South Korean drama film directed by Park Jung-bum. It was first aired as part of tvN's 2019 Drama Stage television series. Unlike the television drama, the newly edited film features the guilt and greed between the characters. It premiered at the 20th Jeonju International Film Festival on 3 May 2019. It made its international premiere and won the Special Jury Prize in the International Competition section of the 72nd Locarno Film Festival in August 2019.

== Plot ==
Police Officer Yeon-soo (Lee Seung-yeon) is dispatched to an island with her daughter after her divorce. When she witnesses the strange relationship between orphan Ye-eun and the island workers in the closed island village community, it terrifies her.

== Cast ==
- Lee Seung-yeon as Yeon-soo
- Lee Yeon as Ye-eun
- Choi Eun-seo
- Park Yeong-deok
- Shin Yeon-sik
- Park Jung-bum
- Ryu Hae-joon as Seong-dae

== Awards and nominations ==
Year	Award ceremony	Category	Nominee	Result	Ref.
2019	Locarno Film Festival	Special Jury Prize	Height of the Wave	Won	
