= Algiers (2024 film) =

2024 film by Chakib Taleb-Bendiab

- Promotional release poster
- Arabic: 196 متر
- Directed by: Chakib Taleb-Bendiab
- Written by: Chakib Taleb-Bendiab
- Produced by: Khaled Chikhi; Yasmine Dhoukar
- Starring: Meriem Medjkane; Nabil Asli; Hichem Mesbah
- Cinematography: Ikbal Arafa
- Edited by: Fouad Benhammou; Chakib Taleb-Bendiab
- Music by: Chakib Taleb-Bendiab; Marielle De Rocca Serra
- Production companies: Temple Production; Clandestino Production; Dinosaures; Centre Algérien de Développement du Cinéma; Praxis Films
- Distributed by: K-Films Amérique (Canada); Mad Solutions (International)
- Release date: August 9, 2024 (RIIFF)
- Running time: 93 minutes
- Countries: Algeria; Tunisia; France
- Languages: Arabic; French

Algiers (Arabic: 196 متر, romanized: 196 mitr, lit. '196 metres') is a 2024 mystery thriller film written, scored, co-edited and directed by Chakib Taleb-Bendiab in his directorial debut. An international co-production between Algeria, Tunisia, and France, the film stars Meriem Medjkane, Nabil Asli and Hichem Mesbah. It won the Grand Prix Award at the 28th Rhode Island International Film Festival.

It was selected as the Algerian entry for the Best International Feature Film at the 97th Academy Awards, but was not nominated.

== Synopsis ==
Dounia is a professional psychiatrist who, together with police inspector Sami, navigates the disturbing shadows of Algeria's past to unravel the mystery of a girl's disappearance.

== Technical details ==
- Original title: 196 Meters (Algiers)
- Native title (Arabic): 196 متر
- Directed by: Chakib Taleb-Bendiab
- Country: Algeria
- Year of release: 2024
- Runtime: 93 minutes
- Production / Distribution: Temple Production, Clandestino Production, Dinosaures, CADC, Institut Français d’Algérie, Praxis Films
- Format / Color: Color
- Genre: Drama / Historical fiction

== Cast ==
- Meriem Medjkane
- Nabil Asli
- Hichem Mesbah
- Ali Namous
- Chahrazad Kracheni
- Slimane Benouari
- Mahfoud Berkane
- Aziz Boukrouni
- Hamida Aït el Hadj
- Brahim Derris
- Niddal El Mellouhi
- Mohamed Frimehdi
- Slimane Bourdous
- Souad Sebki

== Production ==
Principal photography took place in early June 2022 in Algiers, Algeria.

== Release ==
It had its world premiere on August 9, 2024, at the 28th Rhode Island International Film Festival. The distribution rights were sold to K-Films Amérique for release in Canadian theaters, while Mad Solutions acquired international rights.

== Accolades ==
| Year | Award / Festival | Category | Recipient | Result | Ref. |
|---|---|---|---|---|---|
| 2024 | 28th Rhode Island International Film Festival | Grand Prix | Algiers | Won | |
| 2024 | 7th El Gouna Film Festival | Golden Star | Algiers | Nominated | |

== See also ==
- List of submissions to the 97th Academy Awards for Best International Feature Film
- List of Algerian submissions for the Academy Award for Best International Feature Film
