= Burkina Faso–France relations =

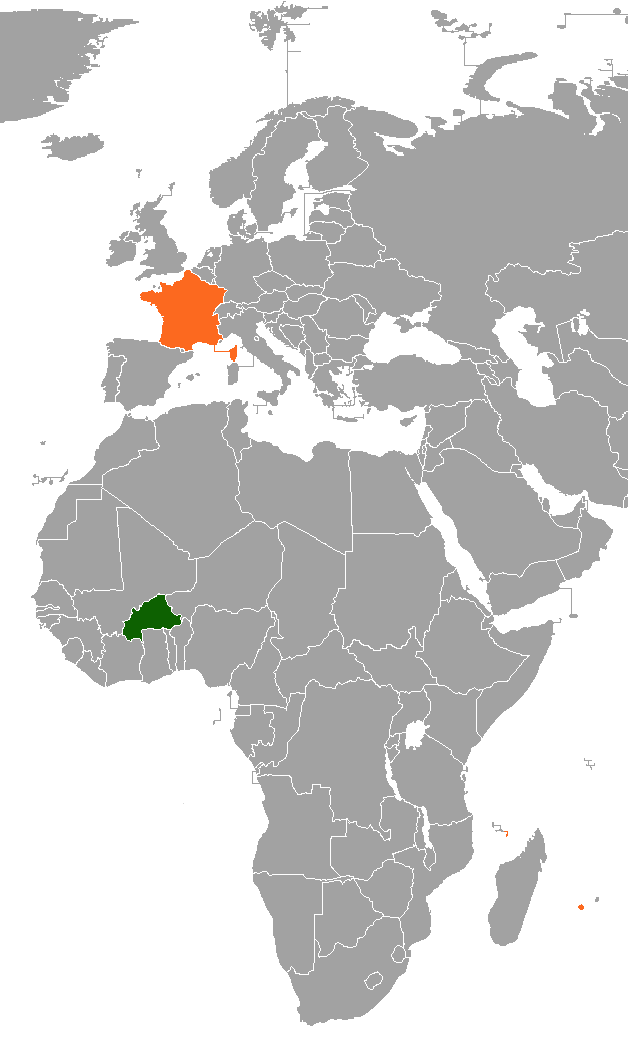
- Burkina Faso: France

Burkina Faso–France relations refers to the diplomatic relations between Burkina Faso and France. Diplomatic relations were established on 4 August 1960. Burkina Faso was formerly part of a French colony called French Upper Volta. France has special forces stationed in Burkina Faso. Burkina Faso has an embassy in Paris, and France has an embassy in Ouagadougou.

In January 2023, Burkina Faso's military junta asked France to recall its ambassador amid a surge of anti-French sentiment as the country moved to develop closer ties to Russia.

In June 2026, Burkina Faso formally severed diplomatic relations with France, accusing the former colonial ruler of neo-colonialism and allegedly supporting subversive activities and terrorists in the Sahel.

== History ==
=== Colonial period ===
Burkina Faso has been part of the CFA franc zone since 1945, when it was still the colony of Upper Volta and part of the General Government of French West Africa of the French colonial Empire. Burkina Faso has not changed its currency since then.

=== Republic of Upper Volta ===
The Republic of Upper Volta gained independence from France in 1958.

Since its creation in 1970, Upper Volta and France have been full members of La Francophonie. Burkina Faso remains a member even after the overthrow of the Republic of Upper Volta.

In 1975, France established the Saint-Exupéry French School in Ouagadougou, first as a primary school, then as a middle school and then as a high school.

=== Under the regime of Thomas Sankara ===
Since 1983, relations between Thomas Sankara and France had been strained due to his anti-imperialist stance, which challenged French influence in Upper Volta. Sankara accused French advisor Guy Penne of involvement in his 1983 arrest. Tensions worsened in 1984 when France rejected a visit by Burkinabe Minister Blaise Compaoré after executions in Ouagadougou. Sankara's Head of Security was arrested in France for "common law crimes". Burkina Faso accused France of supporting opposition forces.

Sankara's widow and supporters have repeatedly accused France of masterminding his 1987 killing because he was a Marxist revolutionary, and so requested France to declassify military documents to check its role in the assassination. Burkina Faso also issued an arrest warrant for Blaise Compaore in 2015, accusing him of involvement in Sankara's killing.

=== Operation Barkhane ===
From 2014 to 2022, cooperation between France and Burkina Faso was close in terms of defence and France's Special Operations Task Force for the region, Operation Sabre, is in Burkina Faso as part of Operation Barkhane.

=== Since the 2022 coup ===
In 2022 and early 2023, several demonstrations took place in Ouagadougou to demand France's withdrawal from Burkina Faso. The country then hosted a contingent of nearly 400 soldiers of the French special forces. On January 23, 2023, Burkina Faso asked for the departure of French troops "within a month". The government of Burkina Faso, which came to power in a coup in September 2022, had shown its willingness to diversify its partnerships, particularly in the fight against jihadism, which has been raging in the country since 2015.

In August 2023, Burkina Faso ended the double taxation treaty with France.

In December 2023, four French agents of the Directorate-General for External Security (DGSE) were arrested in Ouagadougou by Ibrahim Traoré's junta. The Burkinabe authorities accused them of espionage, while France denounced it as a pretext masking the collaboration between the National Intelligence Agency and the Foreign Intelligence Service of Russia. According to Jeune Afrique in January 2024, negotiations between France and Burkina Faso are at a standstill, despite Togolese mediation. This conflict led to the dismissal of the director of the DGSE, Bernard Émié.

In June 2026, Burkina Faso formally severed diplomatic relations with France, accusing the former colonial ruler of neo-colonialism and allegedly supporting subversive activities and terrorists in the Sahel. Communications Minister Gilbert Ouédraogo accused France of "having neo-colonial ambitions, made evident by its active support for subversive networks and the terrorists who are plunging our country and the Sahel into mourning." The government clarified that the decision was exclusively in the field of diplomatic relations between states, and would not affect the cultural, social and historical ties between the two countries.

== Trade ==
In 2022, France exported $384M worth of goods to Burkina Faso, including wheat, medicines and refined petroleum. Burkina Faso exported $35M worth of goods to France, including vegetable oils, cotton and soybeans. All imports from Burkina Faso to France are duty-free and quota-free, with the exception of armaments, as part of the Everything but Arms initiative of the European Union.

== Aid and collaboration ==
France is Burkina Faso's leading bilateral donor and one of 19 priority countries in its development policy. In 2022, the Agence Française de Développement (AFD), a partner of Burkina Faso for 60 years, allocated €83 million to key sectors like water, sanitation, education, energy, and local development, along with €28 million in humanitarian aid. Expertise France manages 6 projects totalling €25 million in EU- and France-funded projects focusing on economic development, security, and trust-building between defense forces and local people in fragile regions. France hosts over 2,500 Burkinabe students, providing €590,000 in scholarships. Two Instituts Français, in Ouagadougou and Bobo-Dioulasso and Maison de la Jeunesse et de l'Innovation (La Ruche) are located in Burkina Faso. Research cooperation includes 50 university agreements with French institutes such as IRD, ANRS and CIRAD. Decentralized cooperation is robust, with 130 partnerships and €9 million in aid from French local authorities in 2017 (the 3rd largest recipient in the world).

== See also ==
- Burkinabes in France
