= Lia Elalouf =

Israeli model and actress

- ליה אללוף
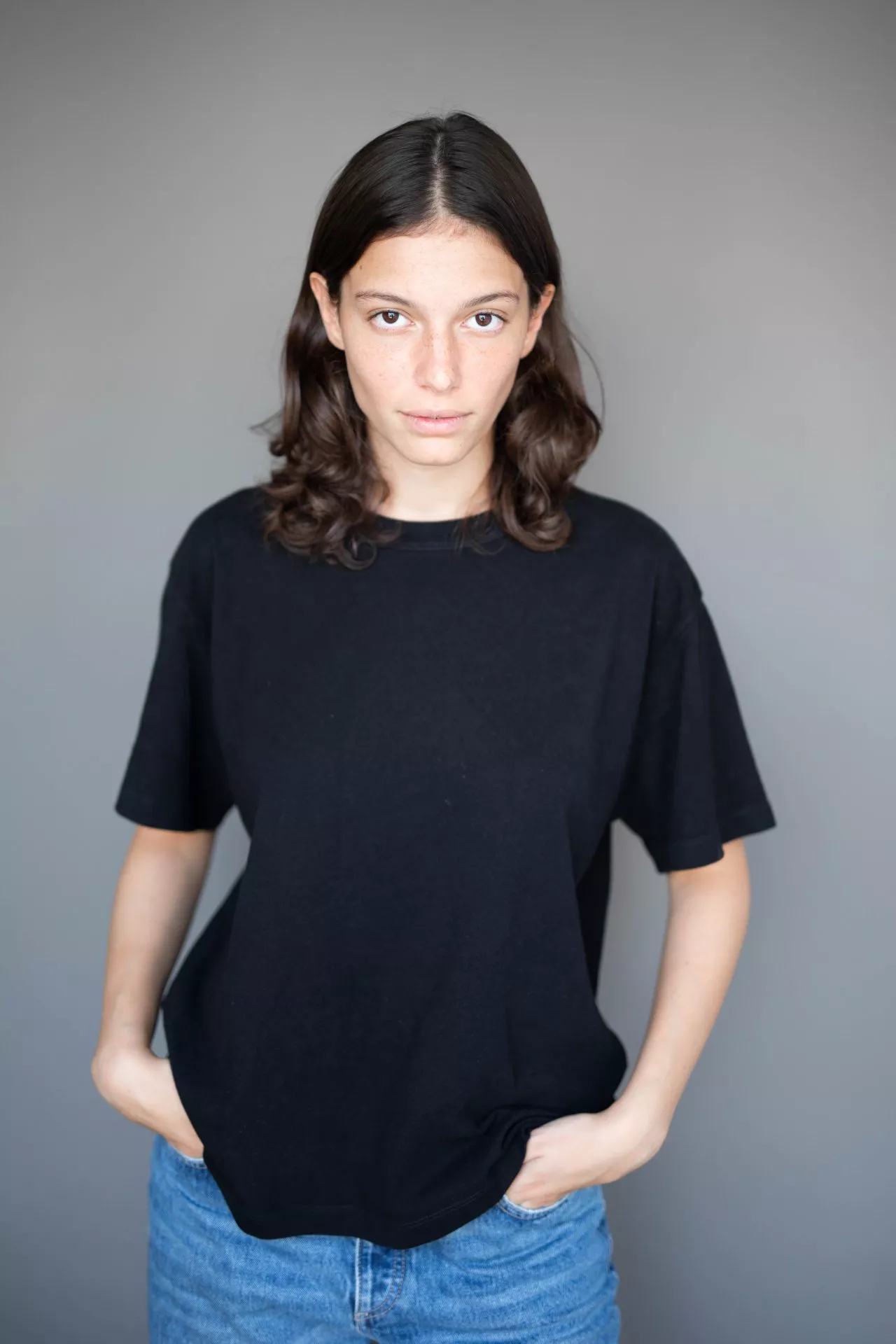
- Born: 2002 (age 23–24); Givatayim
- Citizenship: Israel
- Years active: 2024-present
- Notable work: Come Closer (film)
- Relatives: Dudu Tassa (uncle)
- Awards: Best Actress award, Jerusalem Film Festival, Ophir Award for Best Leading Actress

Lia Elalouf (Hebrew: ליה אללוף; born 2002) is an Israeli model and actress. She won the Ophir Award for Best Leading Actress in 2024 for her role in the film Come Closer.

== Biography ==
Elalouf grew up in Givatayim and served in the Israel Defense Forces (IDF) as a combat collection instructor.

In 2024, she starred in the film Come Closer by Tom Nesher, in which she played the lead role of Eden, a young and wild girl who lost her younger brother Nati in a car accident. Throughout the film, Eden discovers that her brother had an affair with a girl named Maya, portrayed by Daria Rosen. Elalouf won the Best Actress award at the Jerusalem Film Festival for her role in the movie. In September 2024, she won the Ophir Award for Best Leading Actress.

In 2025 she appeared in the suspense drama Fireflies (Hebrew: גחליליות, lit. 'Gahliliot'), alongside Ninet Tayeb and Dana Ivgy, which aired on HOT. She is also appeared in the series "Sea of Death" (Hebrew: רצח בים המלח, lit. 'Murder at the Dead Sea') for Israeli Channel 12.

== Personal life ==
Elalouf was in a relationship with the actor Ofek Pesach until their breakup in 2025. She lives in Tel Aviv.

Elalouf is the niece of singer Dudu Tassa.
