= To the Ends of the Earth (2019 film) =

2019 Japanese drama film

- Film poster
- Kanji: 旅のおわり世界のはじまり
- Directed by: Kiyoshi Kurosawa
- Written by: Kiyoshi Kurosawa
- Starring: Atsuko Maeda; Shota Sometani; Tokio Emoto; Adiz Rajabov; Ryo Kase
- Cinematography: Akiko Ashizawa
- Edited by: Koichi Takahashi
- Music by: Yusuke Hayashi
- Distributed by: Tokyo Theatres Company
- Release date: 14 June 2019 (Japan)
- Running time: 120 minutes
- Countries: Japan; Uzbekistan; Qatar
- Languages: Japanese; Uzbek; English

To the Ends of the Earth (Japanese: 旅のおわり世界のはじまり, Hepburn: Tabi no Owari Sekai no Hajimari) is a 2019 drama film written and directed by Kiyoshi Kurosawa. It stars Atsuko Maeda, Shota Sometani, Tokio Emoto, Adiz Rajabov, and Ryo Kase. It was released in Japan on 14 June 2019. It screened as the closing film at the 72nd Locarno Film Festival on 17 August 2019.

== Plot ==
Yoko (played by Atsuko Maeda) is the reporter for a television travel program who visits Uzbekistan with her television crew to make an episode for the program. She dreams of becoming a singer. The film contrasts Yoko's upbeat on-camera persona with her internal conflicts when she is on her own.

The film consists of a series of episodes in which Yoko wades into a lake to describe looking for a possibly mythical Uzbeki fish; proclaims the delicious crunchiness of under-cooked rice in a bowl of plov, a local dish; repeatedly takes nausea-inducing turns on a fun-park pendulum ride until her camera crew can get enough B-camera footage; and tries to liberate a goat in captivity named Okoo only to be told that if she does, it will be eaten by wild dogs.

She and the crew visit Samarkand and Tashkent; in the latter, she sings the classic Édith Piaf anthem, Hymne à l'amour (with Japanese lyrics), in a fantasy sequence set at the Navoi Theatre which (as is later said) had been built after the war by Japanese POWs. During a visit to the bazaar, she wanders off with a hand-held camera and starts videotaping, winding up in a restricted area. She runs away from the police, who eventually apprehend her but treat her kindly, especially when she learns that her firefighter boyfriend may have been involved in a massive oil refinery fire in Tokyo Bay, where he was stationed. (The boyfriend is never actually seen or heard; all the audience learns about him comes from texts he exchanges with Yoko.)

In a finale set in the mountains, her crew once again in pursuit of a mythical beast, she again sings "Hymne à l'amour" as she imagines that she has caught sight of Okoo running free in the distance.

== Cast ==
- Atsuko Maeda as Yoko
- Shota Sometani as Yoshioka
- Tokio Emoto as Sasaki
- Adiz Rajabov as Temur
- Ryo Kase as Iwao

== Production ==
The film was made to commemorate the 25th anniversary of diplomatic relations between Japan and Uzbekistan, as well as the 70th anniversary of the Navoi Theater, which was built by the forced labour of Japanese POWs after World War II. The filming took place in Uzbekistan.

== Release ==
The film was released in Japan on 14 June 2019. It screened as the closing film at the 72nd Locarno Film Festival on 17 August 2019. It also screened at the 2019 Toronto International Film Festival, the 2019 BFI London Film Festival, the 24th Busan International Film Festival, and the 2019 New York Film Festival.

== Reception ==
On review aggregator website Rotten Tomatoes, the film holds an approval rating of 95% based on 42 reviews, with an average of 8.2/10. The site's critical consensus reads, "To the Ends of the Earth finds filmmaker Kiyoshi Kurosawa crafting an insightful evocation of the feeling of being far from home." On Metacritic, the film has a weighted average score of 85 out of 100, based on 10 critics, indicating "universal acclaim".

Mark Schilling of The Japan Times gave the film 3.5 out of 5 stars, describing it as "a uniquely Kurosawa mix of showbiz comedy, woman-in-jeopardy thriller and romantic drama with Maeda's lonely-but-intrepid heroine serving as the strong connecting thread." Sam C. Mac of Slant Magazine gave the film 4 out of 4 stars, writing, "To the Ends of the Earth isn't, by any measure, a horror film, but it uses aesthetic and philosophical foundations that Kurosawa laid in his genre work to insinuate tensions and anxieties lurking beneath the serene surface of everyday life." Neil Young of The Hollywood Reporter wrote, "Officially endorsed international co-productions are usually stilted, self-consciously didactic affairs; the seasoned but adventurous hands of Kurosawa, however, here yield quietly immersive and spellbinding results."
