= Dudu Tassa =

Israeli rock musician (born 1977)

Dudu Tassa דודו טסה
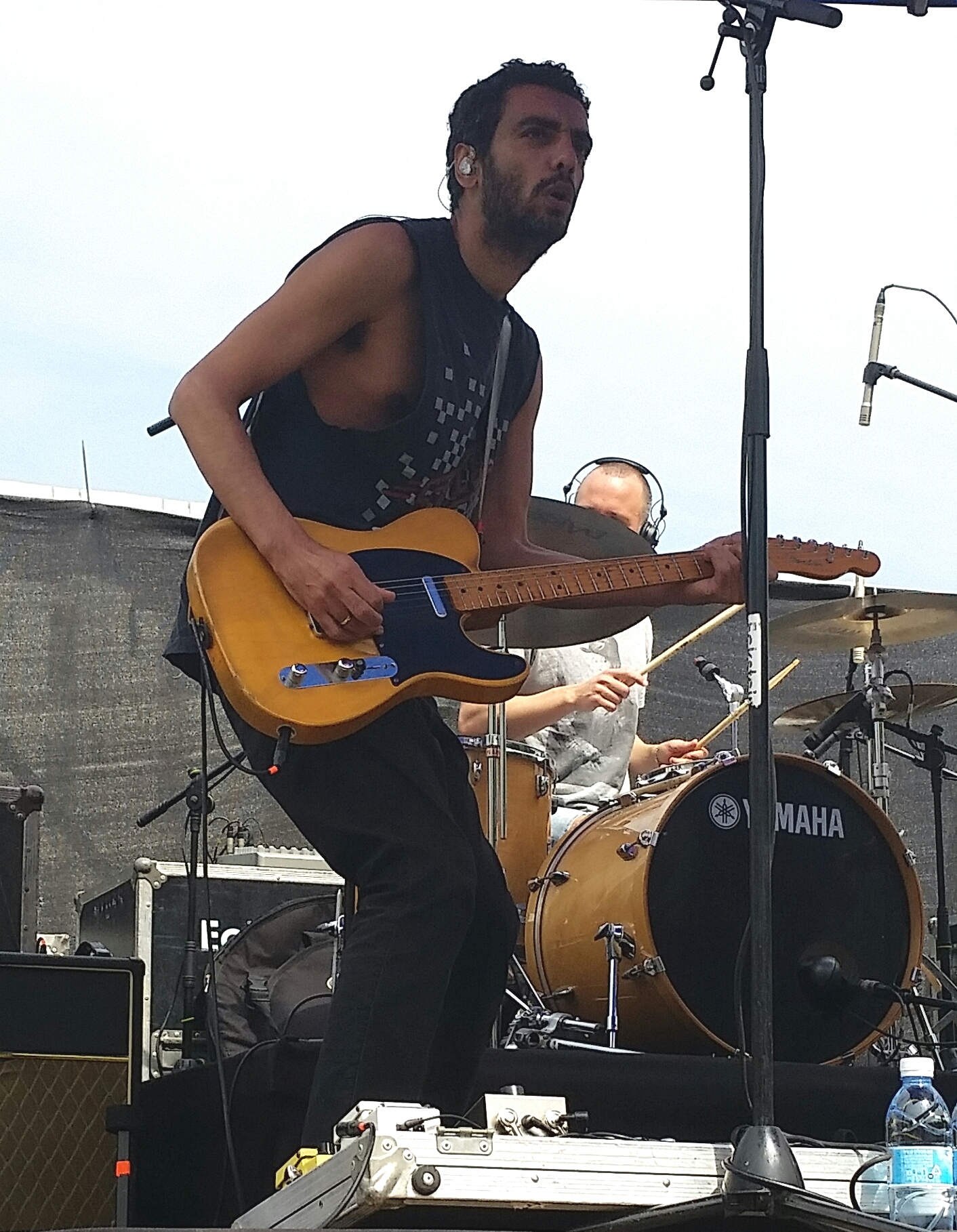
- Dudu Tassa in concert, 2017

Background information
- Born: David Tassa; February 10, 1977 (age 49)
- Origin: Tel Aviv, Israel
- Genres: Rock, pop rock, Arabic music
- Years active: 1992–present
- Label: Hed Artzi

David "Dudu" Tassa (Hebrew: דוד "דודו" טסה; born February 10, 1977) is an Israeli rock musician, singer, songwriter and record producer. Since 2011, Tassa has been the leader of Dudu Tassa & the Kuwaitis, which performs Iraqi and Kuwaiti songs by his deceased grandfather and great-uncle, Daoud and Salih Al-Kuwaity. He also has a solo career, and has collaborated on several occasions with the Radiohead guitarist Jonny Greenwood.

== Life and career ==
Tassa was born and raised in Hatikva Quarter in Tel Aviv, Israel, to a Jewish family who immigrated to Israel from Yemen, Iraq and Kuwait. He was active in the local community center during his childhood. He studied in the theater program at Ironi Alef High School, and at the age of 15 he released his debut album, "Ohev et Ha'Shirim" (Hebrew: אוהב את השירים, "Loving the Songs"), produced by Yishai Ben Tzur. In 2000, after finishing his military service, Tassa released the album Yoter Barur (יותר ברור, "Clearer"), which was critically acclaimed despite slim sales. in 2002 he joined the band of Israeli satirist Eli Yatzpan’s late night show as lead guitarist.

In 2003, Tassa released his third album, Mitokh Behira (מתוך בחירה, "By Choice"), gaining larger exposure than its antecedents. The album also included Tassa's version of "Fog el Nakhal", a famous Iraqi folk song that was also performed by his grandfather Daoud Al-Kuwaity. Tassa recorded the song for the film Turn Left at the End of the World, released a year following the album's release. In 2004 Tassa's fourth album, Bediyuk Bazman (בדיוק בזמן, "Just in Time"), was released, and in 2006 his fifth album, Lola (לולה).

In 2009, Tassa released his sixth album, Basof Mitraglim Le’Hakol (בסוף מתרגלים להכל, "At the End You Get Used to Everything"). It features the Radiohead guitarist Jonny Greenwood. In the same year, Tassa participated in Samuel Maoz’s film Lebanon, playing the role of a Syrian prisoner of war. He later participated in other Israeli films. In 2010 Tassa released a live album named Akharei Layla Shel Ra’ash (אחרי לילה של רעש, "After a Noisy Night"), recorded in his 2009 live concert in Zappa club, in Tel Aviv.

In 2012 Tassa released the album Skharkhoret (סחרחורת, "dizziness"), and participated in Benny Torati's film "Balada La’Aviv Haboche" (בלדה לאביב הבוכה, Ballad Of The Weeping Spring). Two years later, in 2014, he released the album Ir u’Vehalot (עיר ובהלות, "City and Panic.") for which Tassa was awarded the ACUM prize as composer of the year.

In 2016, Tassa released the album Hagoleh (הגולֶה, "The Exile") most of the lyrics in which he wrote in collaboration with Gilad Kahana. In 2017 a second live album was released under the name Dudu Tassa Be'Hofaa (דודו טסה בהופעה, "Dudu Tassa Live"), a double album recorded a year earlier in Hangar 11, a famous concert venue in Tel Aviv. In 2018 Tassa collaborated with Israeli poet Eli Eliahu in the production of the album Igeret el Ha'Yeladim (איגרת אל הילדים, "Letter for the Children") which included eight compositions by Tassa to Eliahu's original poems.

On 9 June 2023, Tassa and Greenwood released Jarak Qaribak, comprising reworkings of Middle Eastern love songs. It features several Middle Eastern musicians. Greenwood said he and Tassa had "tried to imagine what Kraftwerk would have done if they'd been in Cairo in the 1970s". A European tour for Jarak Qaribak was canceled following the outbreak of the Gaza war in 2023.

In May 2025, Tassa and Greenwood's performances in Bristol and London supporting Jarak Qaribak were canceled following "credible threats" to the venues and staff. They released a statement criticising the cancellations as censorship, emphasised the mixed heritage of the performers, and compared the cancellations to the controversy surrounding the hip-hop group Kneecap following their Coachella 2025 performance.

== Dudu Tassa & the Kuwaitis ==
In 2011, Tassa released the album Dudu Tassa & the Kuwaitis giving the name to Tassa's new band. The album was based entirely on Kuwaiti and Iraqi classics from the first half of the 20th century, composed by Tassa's grandfather and great-uncle, Daoud and Salih Al-Kuwaity. Tassa began working on the album about a decade before his release, when he was asked to record the Iraqi classical folk song "Fog el Nakhal" for the soundtrack of "Turn Left at the End of the World". Following this initial experience, Tassa began collecting songs composed by the Al-Kuwaity Brothers and arranging them for an album combining their music with modern music. The album included original recordings of the Al-Kuwaity Brothers and their Iraqi orchestra.

The album was very successful, selling thousands of copies in Israel. Tassa was awarded the prestigious ACUM Prize for the production of the album. The album featured Berry Sakharof, Yehudit Ravitz and Carmela Tassa, Dudu's mother and the daughter of Daoud Al-Kuwaity, who contributed her voice in some Arabic language songs. The single "Wen Ya Galub" from this album was the first song in Arabic to be play-listed on Israel's leading radio stations.

The recording of the first album was documented in the film "Iraq n' Roll" (2011) that tells the story of collecting and reviving the music of the Al-Kuwaity Brothers. The film was screened in many international festivals and won critical praise.

In 2015, Tassa's band's second album, Ala Shawati, was released, featuring Ninet Tayeb in the single "Dhub Utfatar".

Dudu Tassa & the Kuwaitis toured in the US. and Europe and participated in many rock festivals, such as Coachella Festival and SXSW showcase in Austin, TX, the Sziget Festival in Hungary, and WOMEX. In 2017 the band were chosen by Radiohead as its supporting act for their 2017 USA tour and their concert in Israel. In October 2018 the band's album El Hajar ("abandonment" in Arabic) was released.

== Personal life ==
Tassa is of Kuwaiti Jewish ancestry from his paternal and maternal lineage.

Tassa married Noa Kram on 30 September 2014. They have a daughter (born 2015) and a son (born 2017).

Tassa niece is model and actress Lia Elalouf.
