= National Intelligence Agency (Burkina Faso) =

The National Intelligence Agency (abbreviated ANR) is Burkina Faso’s intelligence service. Established in 2015 by President Michel Kafando following a failed coup, it was later strengthened by President Roch Marc Christian Kaboré to fight the escalating jihadist insurgency.

Under the leadership of interim President Ibrahim Traoré, the ANR has faced allegations of involvement in the abduction of individuals critical of the government.

== History ==
For a long time, the Burkinabe intelligence services operated without a framework, via informal networks headed by General Gilbert Diendéré, Blaise Compaoré's right-hand man. Different services existed, dispersed between the army, the gendarmerie and the police.

It was at the end of the transition period, by a decree of 17 October 2015, that the National Intelligence Agency (ANR) was founded by President Michel Kafando. He then followed the advice of the National Reconciliation and Reform Commission (CRNR), after the occurrence of a failed coup against the government and deadly attacks in the north of the country. The aim of the new agency was to coordinate the various intelligence services in Burkina Faso.

It was under the presidency of Roch Marc Christian Kaboré that the ANR became operational and strengthened, particularly after the 2016 attack in Ouagadougou perpetrated by jihadist insurgents, against whom the government wanted to use the ANR. President Kaboré then appointed one of his close associates, François Ouédraogo, to head the agency. The headquarters are located in the Kosyam Palace. At the end of 2017, the creation of a National Intelligence Council was approved to supervise the activities of the ANR.

Following a coup which placed Ibrahim Traoré in power, Captain Oumarou Yabré was appointed head of the agency in October 2022. The following year, after attempts to destabilize the government, the president appointed Commissioner Seydou Ouattara, formerly head of the Special Anti-Terrorist Intervention Brigade (BSIAT), as the Agency's second-in-command.

Under the presidency of Ibrahim Traoré, the number of kidnappings of citizens deemed unfriendly to the government multiplied. The National Intelligence Agency (ANR) was regularly accused of being behind these kidnappings, particularly those of businessman Anselme Sansan Kambou and the journalist Serge Oulon.

On December 1, 2023, four men were arrested in Ouagadougou, just 48 hours after their arrival. They had been sent to Burkina Faso as part of a cooperation agreement with the ANR, a collaboration that continued despite heightened tensions between Burkina Faso and France following Captain Traoré's coup in September 2022. Accused of espionage and attempting to destabilize Traoré’s regime, the men were detained by agents from Burkina Faso's Directorate of State Security (DSE).
