= Tom Nesher =

Israeli film director, screenwriter, journalist

- תום נשר
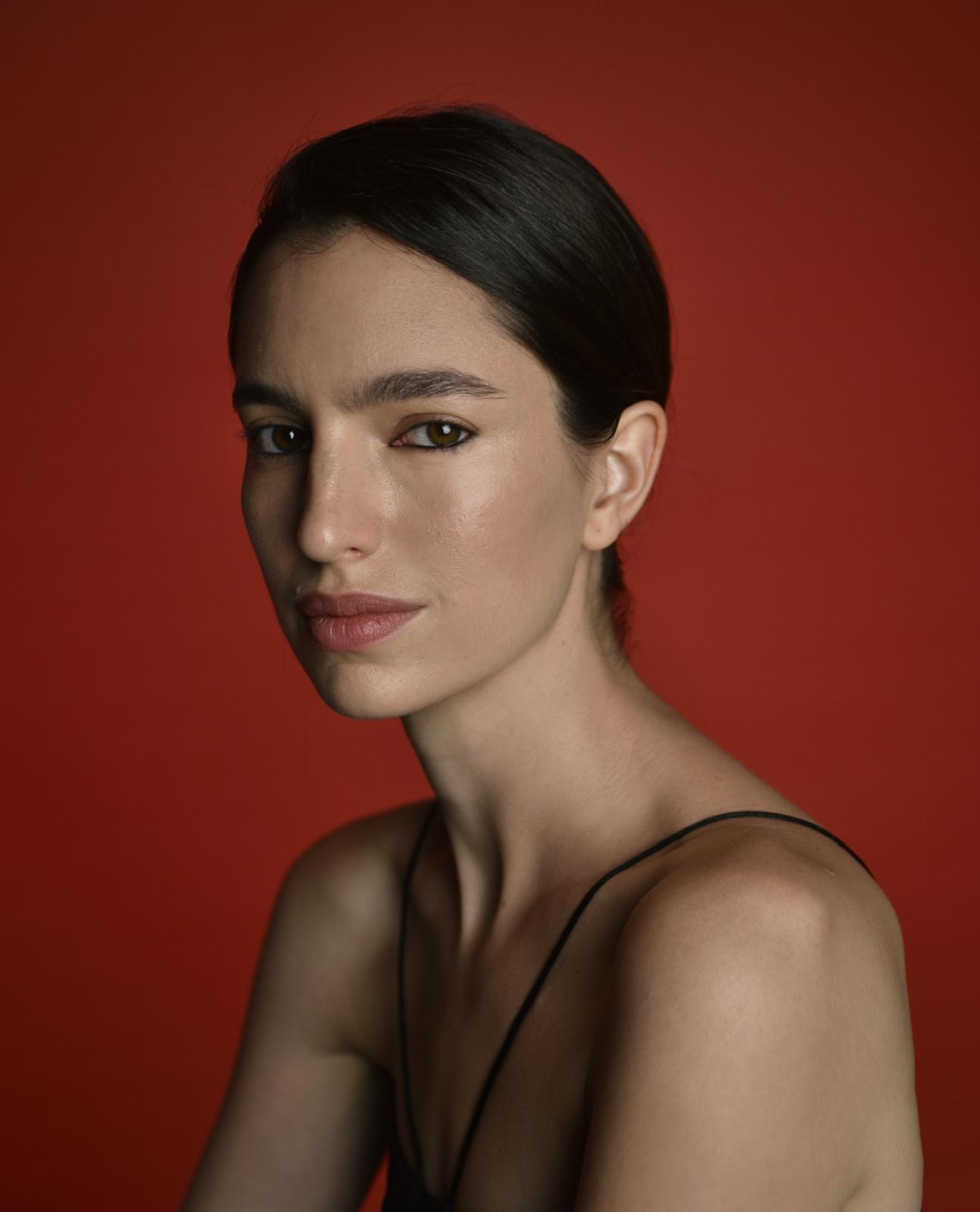
- Born: December 17, 1996 (age 29)
- Occupation: film director
- Notable work: Come Closer
- Father: Avi Nesher
- Awards: Ophir Award for Best Director

Tom Nesher (Hebrew: תום נשר; born December 17, 1996) is an Israeli film director, screenwriter, and journalist. She is an Ophir Awards winner for Best Film and Best Director to 2024 for Come Closer.

== Biography ==
Nesher was born in 1996, the eldest daughter of director Avi Nesher and the artist and photographer Iris Nesher. Her younger brother, Ari, was killed in 2018 at the age of 17 in a hit and run accident caused by footballer Manamto Asefa in Tel Aviv. In high school, she studied at the Thelma Yellin High School In Givatayim.

In 2014, Nesher served as an announcer on Galei Tzahal. After this, she studied screenwriting at the Sam Spiegel Film School, and history and literature at Tel Aviv University.

In 2020, Nesher joined Channel 13 News as an investigative reporter.

In 2024, Nesher released her debut feature film, Come Closer, a drama heavily inspired by her own grief and personal experience. The film follows Eden, a young woman who, after the tragic death of her brother, embarks on an intense emotional journey to find his secret girlfriend, navigating complex themes of youth, intimacy and healing. The film winning four major awards at the 2024 Ophir Awards, including Best Feature Film and Best Director for Nesher, and Best Actress for Lia Elalouf. It was subsequently selected as the Israeli entry for Best International Feature Film at the 97th Academy Awards.

== Awards and recognition ==
- 2024 - Tribeca Film Festival: Viewpoints Award (Come Closer)
- 2024 - Jerusalem Film Festival: GWFF Award for Best Israeli First Feature (Come Closer)
- 2024 - Ophir Awards: Best Feature Film and Best Director (Come Closer)

In 2025, Nesher was elected for Veriety's prestigious "10 Directors to watch" list.

== Personal life ==
Since 2016, Nesher has been in relationship with Guy Kornowski, and in April 2026, they had their first son.
