= Come Closer (film) =

- Theatrical release poster
- Directed by: Tom Nesher
- Written by: Tom Nesher
- Produced by: Haim Mecklberg; Estee Yacov-Mecklberg; Tomer Mecklberg; Moshe Edery; Leon Edery; Domenico Procacci; Laura Paolucci; Oren Rogovin; Omer Rogovin; Hezi Bezalel; Carnie Bezalel; Omri Bezalel; Anthony Bregman; Yigal Mograbi
- Starring: Lia Elalouf; Darya Rosenn
- Cinematography: Shai Peleg
- Edited by: Shauly Melamed
- Music by: Ginevra Nervi
- Production companies: 2-Team Productions; Rogovin Brothers
- Distributed by: United King Films
- Release dates: June 6, 2024 (Tribeca); September 19, 2024 (Israel)
- Running time: 107 minutes
- Countries: Israel; Italy
- Language: Hebrew
- Box office: $6,308

Come Closer (Hebrew: קרוב אלי, romanized: Karov Ellay) is a 2024 drama film written and directed by Tom Nesher in her directorial debut. Starring Lia Elalouf and Darya Rosenn accompanied by Ido Tako, Yaakov Zada-Daniel and Netta Garti. It is about a troubled young woman who becomes obsessed with her deceased brother's girlfriend after his sudden death. After winning the Ophir Award for Best Picture, it was officially selected as the Israeli entry for the Best International Feature Film at the 97th Academy Awards, but was not nominated.

== Making of the Film ==
Nesher wrote the screenplay for the film, initially titled "Finally", which was based on her personal story. She was the youngest creator to receive government funding for film production. In September 2018, Tom's brother Ari was killed in a car accident shortly after his 17th birthday. Since their father, film director Avi Nesher, is a well-known public figure, the tragedy received particular media attention, and the public showed support for the family.

== Synopsis ==
The sudden death of Eden's beloved younger brother leads her to try to fill the void that has opened up in her life. Soon, she discovers that her brother had a secret girlfriend and with her she embarks on an emotional, complex and dangerous journey.

== Cast ==
- Lia Elalouf as Eden
- Darya Rosenn as Maya
- Ido Tako as Nati
- Yaakov Zada-Daniel as Shlomo
- Netta Garti as Mother
- Shlomi Shaban
- Ofek Pesach
- Yael Shoshana Cohen
- Lia Schon
- Shay Litman
- Shifra Cornfeld
- Karin Tepper
- Yotam Jonathan Rabino
- Inbar Livne
- Romi Halkin
- Hani Sirkis

== Release ==
It had its world premiere on June 6, 2024, at the 23rd Tribeca Festival, then screened on July 22, 2024, at the 41st Jerusalem Film Festival. It was released commercially on September 19, 2024, in Israeli theaters.

The film was the first by an Israeli director since the beginning of Gaza war to be released commercially in the United States.

== Reception ==
The film was nominated in 12 categories at the 2024 Ophir Awards, and won in the categories of Best Film, Best Leading Actress, Best Director, and Best Editing.

In July 2024, the film won The GWFF Award for Best Israeli First Feature at the Jerusalem Film Festival.

The film won an award at the Tribeca Film Festival in New York in the Viewpoints category, which is dedicated to films that present "boundary-pushing, rule-breaking new voices in independent film."

In November 2024, Variety named director Tom Nesher as one of their "10 Directors to Watch for 2025."

== Accolades ==
Year	Award / Festival	Category	Recipient	Result	Ref.
2024	23rd Tribeca Festival	Viewpoints Award	Come Closer	Won	
2024	41st Jerusalem Film Festival	Haggiag Award - Best Israeli Feature Film	Come Closer	Nominated	
2024	41st Jerusalem Film Festival	Best Israeli First Feature	Come Closer	Won	
2024	41st Jerusalem Film Festival	Best Actress	Lia Elalouf	Won	
2024	41st Jerusalem Film Festival	Best Original Score	Ginevra Nervi	Won	
2024	35th Ophir Awards	Best Picture	Come Closer	Won	
2024	35th Ophir Awards	Best Director	Tom Nesher	Won	
2024	35th Ophir Awards	Best Actress	Lia Elalouf	Won	
2024	35th Ophir Awards	Best Supporting Actress	Darya Rosenn	Nominated	
2024	35th Ophir Awards	Best Screenplay	Tom Nesher	Nominated	
2024	35th Ophir Awards	Best Cinematography	Shai Peleg	Nominated	
2024	35th Ophir Awards	Best Editing	Shauly Melamed	Won	
2024	35th Ophir Awards	Best Art Direction	Almog Sela, Itamar Thorn & Vera Greenblatt	Nominated	
2024	35th Ophir Awards	Best Costume Design	Gabrielle Orion Hasson & Tamar Eyal	Nominated	
2024	35th Ophir Awards	Best Makeup	Keren Assaf	Nominated	
2024	35th Ophir Awards	Best Casting	Chamutal Zerem & Esther Kling	Nominated	
2024	35th Ophir Awards	Best Sound	Ronen Nagel & Ori Tchechik	Nominated	

== See also ==
- List of submissions to the 97th Academy Awards for Best International Feature Film
- List of Israeli submissions for the Academy Award for Best International Feature Film
