= Alfredo Hueck =

Venezuelan filmmaker (born 1980)

Alfredo Hueck (born 1980) is a Venezuelan film producer, editor, writer and director. He is known for his professional debut, [YBI-173], and 2015 film Package #3, both award-winning. He also worked on other films in the 2010s, notably with his brother, director Luis.

== Early life ==
Hueck became interested in cinema through his parents, who kept many cameras. His interest grew when he was taught how to connect the Betamax his family had. Hueck recalls that his father had always made his older brother, director Luis Carlos Hueck, connect the machine but one day Luis Carlos grew bored of doing it and taught Alfredo how to use the cables. Hueck says that at this moment he "realized that [he] could manipulate the image and started buying cables, editing, [and] making videos".

== Career ==
Alfredo Hueck studied at the Universidad Santa María in Caracas, graduating in the first communications class, and at night school at the Caracas School of Film and Television. He won the Best Documentary in a student competition in Bogotá, Colombia, in 1999 for a film he created with his brother called Ella Es...; in 2001, still a student, Hueck made the short film "Espinoza", which became an official selection at the Guanajuato Film Festival. During the afternoons at university, Hueck worked as an intern at Televen, and went into editing, working at advertising post-production company Anonymous Studio. He created short films in his spare time, taking three years to create his first.

Hueck's first major film was the 2005 16 mm short film [YBI-173], which won Best Writing, Best Actor, Best Editing, and Best Fiction Short across Venezuelan festivals; it also won Best Latin American Short Film at the 2005 Televisión Española Versión Española awards; this award was presented to Hueck by Penélope Cruz and Pedro Almodóvar. Part of the award was a feature film grant, which he used to fund future film Package #3. It was an official selection at the Los Angeles Latino International Film Festival. After the success of [YBI-173], Hueck was able to finance two more short films, Un Gallo y un Corral in Venezuela, and GET IN LOVE in Spain. GET IN LOVE was filmed in the Madrid Metro in the guerrilla film style, and was a selection at the French Cine Rail Festival, getting a Special Jury Mention at the 2007 Brussels International Film Festival.

In 2007, Hueck also contributed to directing a Villa del Cine film, taking the helm of "Bloque 1", the first of two shorts in the film Bloques, which was an official selection of the São Paulo International Film Festival. In 2008, he was filming the short film Stay, and took part in the TNT reality show Project 48 - the film was shown on the network across Latin America alongside a special of the show. Stay won Best Editing, Best Fiction Short Film, and the Audience Award in the Caracas Short Film Festival.

With his brother, Hueck worked on the 2013 film Papita, maní, tostón, which became Venezuela's highest-grossing film. He edited the Cuban film La Piscina, which was selected for the Berlin Film Festival. He also directed a segment of the 2013-released anthology film Caracas, Te Quiero Que Jode, called Guárdame puesto (Save me a spot). Hueck released the first trailer for this short as part of the project in 2009.

Hueck's first directorial feature film was the 2015 Package #3, a political satire about Venezuela. In 2016, he was writing more features, including Cardboard Weddings. Package #3 also found funding on Indiegogo and was shown at the first Barcelona Venezuelan film festival, the Miami Venezuelan film festival, and the New York Venezuelan film festival. It was nominated for Best Venezuelan Film at the 2016 Estereo awards. Also in 2016, his short film Lady in White won the Best Action Film award at Top Shorts film festival.

He was the edit supervisor for the 2018 American film The Compassion Project. In 2019, Hueck was hired as a director for the Colombian Sony Pictures Television show Manual para Galanes.

Interviewed in 2016, Hueck said that the hardest part of making films in Venezuela is financing, as there is little money so he often works by getting sponsors or borrowing equipment and only paying actors in credit. However, he thinks there is a benefit to making a film on a minimal budget, as it opens up creative problem-solving and innovative ways of telling the same story. Hueck also explained his creative process, starting with a script, then actors, then crew and filming, and then music; he often works with the same people, actors and creatives who "when [he sees] them working [he thinks] they are the best".
