= Take My Breath (film) =

- Directed by: Nada Mezni Hafaiedh
- Written by: Nada Mezni Hafaiedh
- Starring: Fatma Ben Saïdane, Mohamed Dahech, Mohamed Mrad
- Release dates: 2023
- Country: Tunisia
- Language: Arabic

Take My Breath is a 2023 thriller drama film written and directed by Nada Mezni Hafaiedh which was shot in Tunis, Tunisia. The film was co-produced by Slim Hafaiedh of Leyth Production and Ziad H. Hamzeh of Hamzeh Mystique Films. The film was first released in Poland on October 11, 2023 at the Warsaw Film Festival and later in Tunisia on November 1, 2023.

== Plot ==
Take My Breath tells the story of the conflict that exists between desire and self-identity. It follows the life of Shams, a young seamstress with an intersex identity, faced with her secret been revealed, entangled in a love triangle situation. Also she is faced with several attacks from an obsessed attacker which forces her to flee the city.

== Cast ==
- Amina Ben Ismail
- Sana Ben Cheikh Larbi
- Fatma Ben Saïdane
- Walid Dziri
- Fethi Akkari
- Aymen Ben Hmida
- Mohamed Dahech
- Mohammed Mrad

== Language spoken ==
- Arabic

== Recognition ==
- Submitted as the entry for Tunisia in the Best International Feature Film category at the 97th Academy Awards.
