= Nadim Tabet =

Lebanese filmmaker

- Lebanese director Nadim Tabet
- Born: Nadim Tabet; 1982 (age 43–44); Beirut, Lebanon
- Education: Sorbonne University
- Occupations: Director, producer, screenwriter
- Years active: 1997–present

Nadim Tabet (born 1982), is a Lebanese filmmaker. He is best known as the director of critically acclaimed film One of These Days.

== Personal life ==
He was born in 1982 in Beirut, Lebanon.

== Career ==
From a young age, Tabet was fond of making films. He started film shooting with two short fictions in video, first one Caravane in 1997 and then Kodak Color in 1998. Then he moved to France in 1999 to pursue his studies in human sciences and cinema at the Sorbonne University. In the meantime, he directs shorts Histoires extraordinaires du cinématographe in 1999. He continued to directed shorts in following years, such as Martine et Alia in 2001, Passé présent futur in 2002, and L’Arche de Noé in 2003. In 2005, he made the short Violante and, short Le Liban en automne in 2006. Both of them received good reviews and Tabet made his next short Jeunes et innocents in 2007. Then in 2008 he made Spring 75 and Souvenirs d’un été in 2011. In 2014, he made the critically acclaimed short Eté 91.

In 2001, Tabet co-founded the Lebanese Film Festival. Since 2011, he became a member of the selection committee of the Oberhausen International Short Film Festival. After making several critically acclaimed shorts, he directed his maiden feature film One of These Days in 2017. the film later won the award for the Best Debut Feature at the 22nd Arab Film Festival. In 2019, he co-directed the series Faraya along with another Lebanese filmmaker Mounia Akl.

== Filmography ==
Year	Film	Role	Genre	Ref.
1997	Caravane	Director	Short film	
1998	Kodak Color	Director	Short film	
1999	Histoires extraordinaires du cinématographe	Director	Short film	
2001	Martine et Alia	Director	Short film	
2002	Passé présent futur	Director	Short film	
2003	L’Arche de Noé	Director	Short film	
2005	Violante	Director	Short film	
2006	Le Liban en automne	Director	Short film	
2007	Jeunes et innocents	Director	Short film	
2008	Spring 75	Director	Short film	
2011	Souvenirs d’un été	Director	Short film	
2014	Eté 91	Director	Short film	
2015	C'est la guerre en Syrie qui l'a tuée	Director, writer, editor	Short film	
2017	One of These Days	Director, writer	Film	
TBD	Lebanon in autumn	Director	Film	
TBD	In This Darkness I See You ahead of the Cannes market	Director	Film	

== See also ==
- Cinema of Africa
