= Maura Delpero =

Italian filmmaker (born 1975)

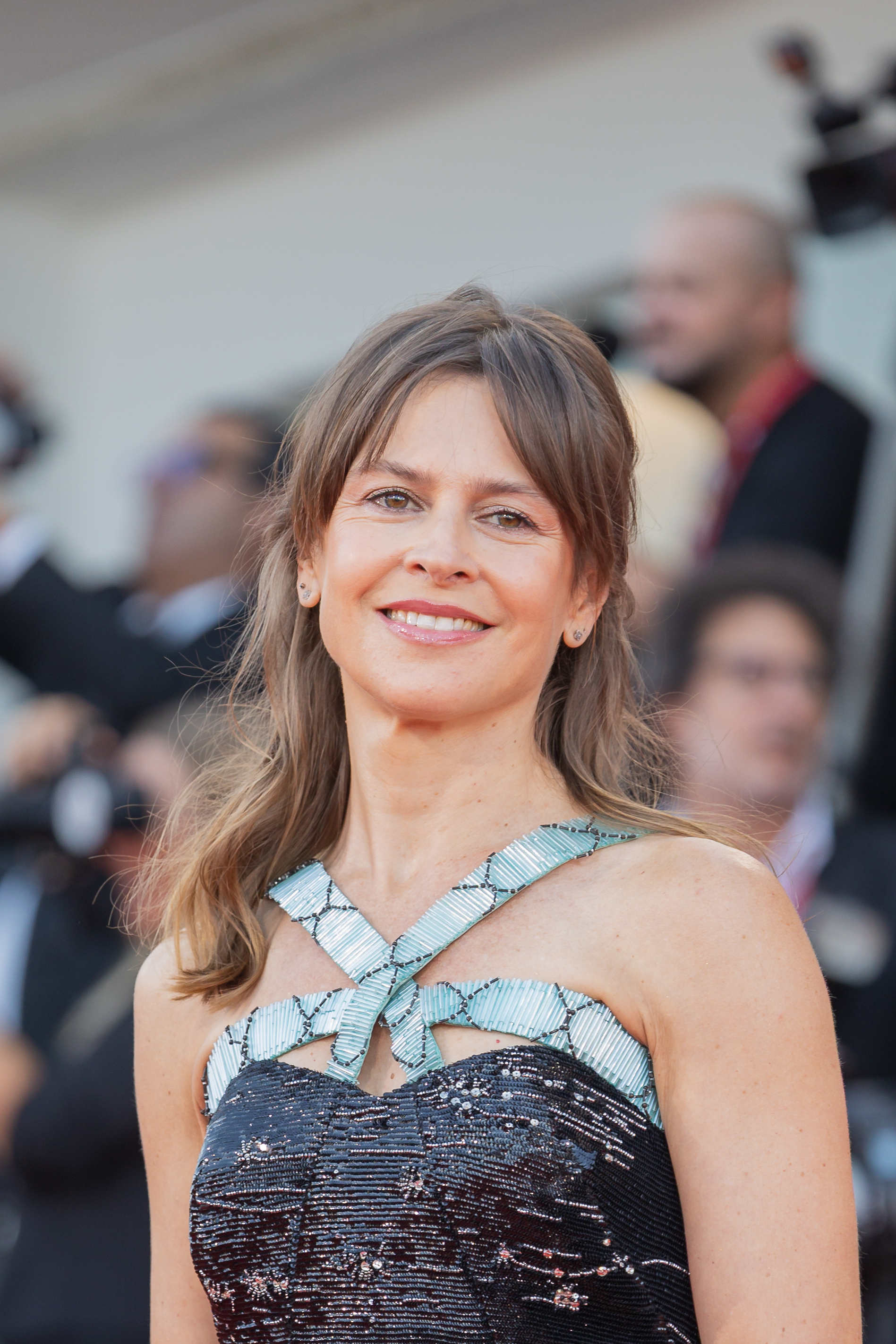
- Delpero in 2025
- Born: October 3, 1975 (age 50); Bolzano, Italy
- Occupation: Film director

Maura Delpero (born 3 October 1975) is an Italian filmmaker best known for the drama films Maternal (2019) and Vermiglio (2024).

== Early life and education ==
Delpero was born in Bolzano, Italy. After studying literature at University of Bologna and a brief period at Sorbonne University, she studied film at the Professional Training Center of SICA in Buenos Aires.

== Career ==
Delpero's first two films, the documentaries Teachers (Signori Professori) and Nadea and Sveta (Nadea e Sveta), premiered at the Torino Film Festival in 2008 and 2012, respectively. For Nadea and Sveta, Delpero was nominated in the Best Documentary Feature category at the 58th David di Donatello awards ceremony.

In 2019, Delpero's feature film debut Maternal (Hogar) premiered at the 72nd Locarno Film Festival, where it received a special mention in the Concorso Internazionale competition and was awarded the Prize of the Ecumenical Jury. The film was inspired by Delpero's own experiences as a teacher in Argentine "hogars", homes for teenage mothers often administered by nuns.

Delpero was awarded the 2020 Women in Motion Young Talent Award, presented by Kering and the Cannes Film Festival. The following year, Maternal earned Delpero a nomination for Best New Director at the 66th David di Donatello in 2021.

In 2022, Delpero received the Coprocity Development award for her second feature film, the World War II drama The Mountain Bride. Retitled Vermiglio, the film debuted at the 81st Venice International Film Festival in 2024, where it won the Grand Jury Prize. The film also won the Gold Hugo for best film at the 60th Chicago International Film Festival, the award for best international screenplay at the 36th Palm Springs International Film Festival, and seven David di Donatello, including for best film, best director and best screenplay.

Chosen as Italy's entry for the Oscars 2025, it has been shortlisted among the 15 films for the Best International Feature. It was also nominated for Best Film and Best Director at The European Film Awards and it was a nominee for Best Motion Picture-Non English language at the 2025 Golden Globes.

== Filmography ==
Year	English title	Original title	Ref.
2008	Teachers	Signori Professori	
2012	Nadea and Sveta	Nadea e Sveta	
2019	Maternal	Hogar	
2024	Vermiglio		

== Awards and nominations ==
Award	Year	Category	Nominated work	Result	Ref.
Cannes Film Festival	2020	Women in Motion Young Talent Award	—N/a	Won	
David di Donatello	2013	Best Documentary Feature	Nadea and Sveta	Nominated	
David di Donatello	2021	Best New Director	Maternal	Nominated	
David di Donatello	2025	Best Film	Vermiglio	Won	
David di Donatello	2025	Best Director	Vermiglio	Won	
David di Donatello	2025	Best Original Screenplay	Vermiglio	Won	
David di Donatello	2025	Best Producer	Vermiglio	Won	
European Film Awards	2024	European Film	Vermiglio	Nominated	
European Film Awards	2024	European Director	Vermiglio	Nominated	
Locarno Film Festival	2019	Golden Leopard	Maternal	Special mention	
Locarno Film Festival	2019	Europa Cinemas Label for Best European Film	Maternal	Won	
Locarno Film Festival	2019	Prize of the Ecumenical Jury	Maternal	Won	
Nastro d'argento	2021	Best New Director	Maternal	Nominated	
Nastro d'argento	2025	Best Film	Vermiglio	Nominated	
Nastro d'argento	2025	Best Director	Vermiglio	Nominated	
Torino Film Festival	2008	UCCA Award - Best Italian Documentary	Teachers	Won	
Torino Film Festival	2008	AVANTI! Award	Teachers	Won	
Torino Film Festival	2012	Best Film About the Working World	Nadea and Sveta	Won	
Torino Film Festival	2012	UCCA Award	Nadea and Sveta	Special mention	
Venice Film Festival	2024	Grand Jury Prize	Vermiglio	Won	
