= Nafi's Father =

2019 film

- Film poster
- Directed by: Mamadou Dia
- Produced by: Maba Ba; Mamadou Dia; Mohamed Julien Ndao
- Starring: Saikou Lo
- Cinematography: Sheldon Chau
- Edited by: Alan Wu
- Music by: Gavin Brivik
- Production company: JoyeDidi
- Release date: 15 August 2019 (Locarno)
- Running time: 107 minutes
- Country: Senegal
- Language: Fulah

Nafi's Father is a 2019 Senegalese drama film directed by Mamadou Dia. It was selected as the Senegalese entry for the Best International Feature Film at the 93rd Academy Awards, but it was not nominated.

== Cast ==
- Saikou Lo as Ousmane
- Alassane Sy as Tierno
- Penda Daly Sy as Rakia

== See also ==
- List of submissions to the 93rd Academy Awards for Best International Feature Film
- List of Senegalese submissions for the Academy Award for Best International Feature Film
