= Chakib Taleb-Bendiab =

Algerian filmmaker

- شكيب طالب بن دياب
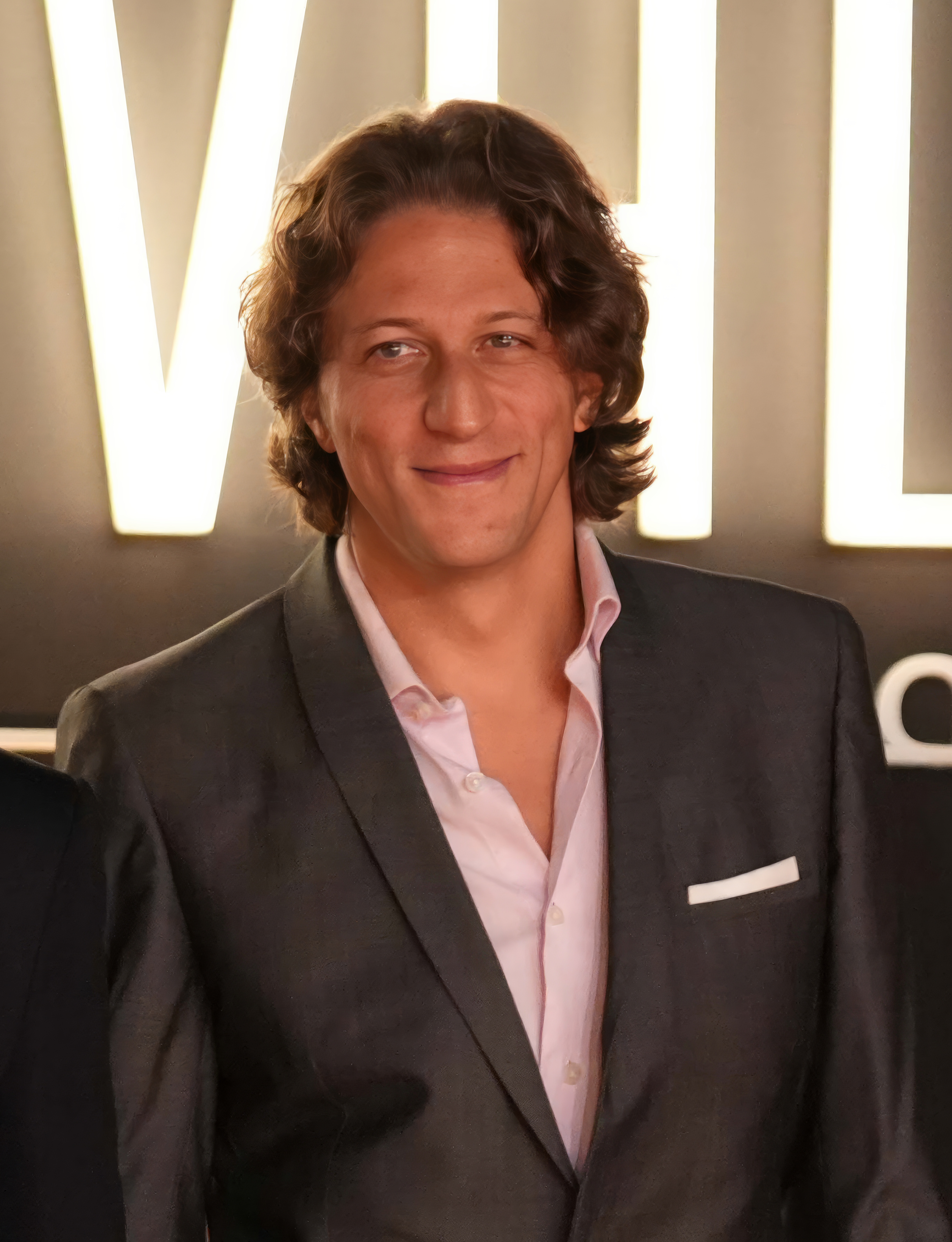
- El Gouna Film Festival 2024
- Born: 1982 (age 43–44)
- Occupation: Filmmaker
- Website: https://chakib-taleb.com

Chakib Taleb-Bendiab (Arabic: شكيب طالب بن دياب; born in 1982) is an Algerian screenwriter, director and music composer.

His short film "Cold Blood" (French: Sang Froid," won the Best Screenplay award at the Sapporo Short Film Festival in Japan. As for Black Spirit, his second fiction short film delves into a legend of African samurai in the Sahara and has received accolades at over 40 International festivals worldwide.

His first feature film "Algiers, 196 Meters" (internationally known as "Algiers with stars Meriem Medjkane, Nabil Asli, Hichem Mesbah and Ali Namous), won the Grand Prix Award for Best Feature at the 28th Rhode Island International Film Festival. And will officially represent Algeria at the 97th Academy Awards® for Best International Feature Film category.
