= Maternal (film) =

2019 drama film

- Directed by: Maura Delpero
- Screenplay by: Maura Delpero
- Produced by: Alessandro Amato; Luigi Chimienti; Gregorio Paonessa; Marta Donzelli; Nicolas Avruj; Diego Lerman
- Starring: Denise Carrizo
- Cinematography: Soledad Rodríguez
- Edited by: Ilaria Fraioli; Luca Mattei
- Release dates: December 12, 2019 (Argentina); May 13, 2021 (Italy)
- Running time: 91 minutes
- Countries: Argentina; Italy
- Languages: Italian; Spanish

Maternal (Spanish: Hogar) is a 2019 drama film co-written and directed by Maura Delpero, in her narrative directorial debut.

== Cast ==
- Denise Carrizo as Fátima
- Agustina Malale as Agustina
- Lidiya Liberman as Sister Paola
- Marta Lubos as Mother superior
- Isabella Cilia as Nina
- Alan Rivas as Michael
- Livia Fernán as Sister Pía
- Renata Palminiello as Sister Bruna

== Production ==
Director Maura Delpero spent four years researching for the film in various hogars (hostels for single mothers run by nuns) in Argentina. Except for Lidiya Liberman in the role of Sister Paola, the main cast consists of non-professional actors.

== Release ==
The film premiered at the 72nd Locarno Film Festival. It was later screened on numerous other festivals, including San Sebastián International Film Festival, BFI London Film Festival, Chicago International Film Festival, Busan International Film Festival and Moscow International Film Festival. It was released in Argentine cinemas on 12 December 2019 and on Italian cinemas on 13 May 2021.

== Reception ==
On the review aggregator website Rotten Tomatoes, 100% of 11 critics' reviews are positive, with an average rating of 7.7/10. For this film Delpero received a David di Donatello nomination for best new director and a Nastro d'Argento nomination in the same category.
