= Kiva Reardon =

Canadian film programmer, writer, editor, and commentator

- Occupations: Programmer, writer, editor, and commentator

Kiva Reardon is a Canadian film programmer, writer, editor, and commentator.

== Background ==
Reardon grew up in Toronto, and credits watching Elwy Yost's long-running Saturday Night at the Movies as her first introduction to film studies.

Reardon is fluent in both English and French.

== Studies ==
Reardon graduated with a bachelor's degree in Cultural Studies from McGill University in 2010. She then entered the Masters of Arts program at the University of Toronto's Cinema Studies Institute, graduating in 2013. During her Masters she interned on a film by John Greyson.

== Career ==
In 2013, Reardon founded cléo: a journal of film and feminism—a publication dedicated to film and film culture and informed by intersectional feminist perspectives. The journal was named for the protagonist of Agnès Varda's 1962 film Cléo from 5 to 7. The journal published a total of 19 issues over six years. In August 2019, following a loss of funding due to cuts to the Ontario Arts Council by the Doug Ford government, the editors announced that the 19th issue of cléo would be the last. In December 2019, the journal published a print compendium titled the cléo reader: 2013-2019.

In 2018, Reardon spoke at the BFI Southbank as part of their season dedicated to Agnès Varda. In December 2019, Reardon gave the keynote address for a film series in Sudbury that opened with Cléo from 5 to 7.

Reardon has worked at a number of film festivals, including the Miami Film Festival, Hot Docs Canadian International Documentary Festival, and the International Film Festival Rotterdam. She was the lead programmer of Contemporary World Cinema at the Toronto International Film Festival from 2017 to 2020. Variety profiled Reardon during TIFF 2019, describing her efforts to curate a more inclusive selection of films.

After relocating to Los Angeles in 2020, Reardon held the position of associate director of Film Programs at the Academy Museum of Motion Pictures. In 2022, Reardon joined Barry Jenkins, Adele Romanski and Mark Ceryak's production company, Pastel, as VP Film.
