= Aïcha Boro =

Film director and screenwriter (1978–) from France/Burkina Faso

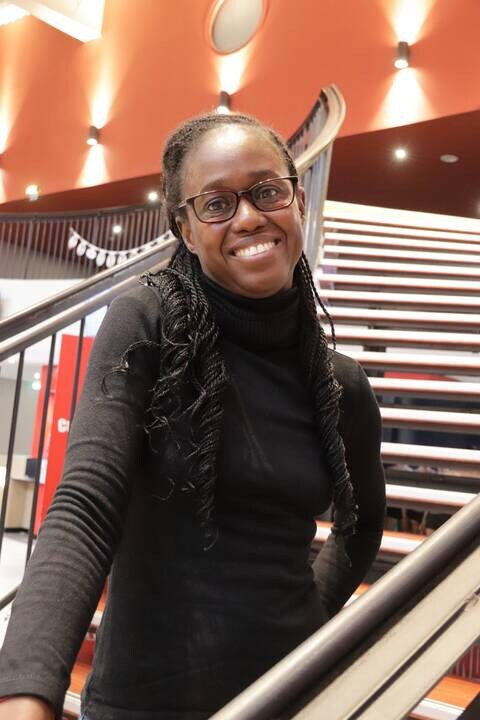
- Born: May 24, 1978 (age 47)
- Other names: Chloé Aïcha Boro Letterier
- Occupations: Film director, screenwriter
- Years active: 2006-present

Chloé Aïcha Boro Letterier (born 24 May 1978) is a Burkinabé film director and screenwriter.

== Biography ==
Boro grew up in Ouagadougou near the Balolé quarry. She studied modern literature and pursued a career as a journalist. She wrote for the Burkinabé magazines and newspapers "La Voix du Sahel" and "Le Marabout", and published her first novel, Paroles orpheline, in 2006. Partially autobiographical, it received the Naji Naaman Prize in Lebanon. Boro gradually turned her attention to film, and served as assistant director and presenter of the TV program Koodo, receiving the Galian Prize in 2006. She also produced a documentary about genetically-modified organisms and presented a radio program for Radio Gambidi. In 2010, Boro moved to France.

In 2012, she directed her first film, Sur les traces de Salimata. Boro came out with her first feature-length documentary, Farafin Ko, in 2014. In 2017, she directed France-Aurevoir, le nouveau commerce triangulaire. It was named Best Documentary at the Festival international de cinéma Vues d’Afrique in Montreal. The film examines the triangular cotton trade. In 2018, Boro wrote the novel Notre Djihad intérieur, examining the topics of exile and contradictions of faith by telling the story of an African expatriate living in France returning to his village. Boro directed Le Loup d'or de Balolé in 2019. The documentary examines the workers at the Balolé quarry and the effects of the political revolution in 2014. It received the Best Feature Documentary at the Panafrican Film and Television Festival of Ouagadougou.

Al Djanat: The Original Paradise, Boro's 2023 documentary, follows her on her return to Burkina Faso upon the death of her uncle. The film had its world premiere at Fespaco in 2023 and went on to screen internationally at festivals that included the International Documentary Film Festival Amsterdam, Visions du Réel, DOC NYC, and Hot Docs Canadian International Documentary Festival. Al Djanat was awarded the Al Jazeera-Encounters Best African Documentary at the Encounters South Africa International Documentary Film Festival, the Jury Award at Major Docs (Spain) and the Primer Premio Largometraje Documental award at El Festival Internacional de Cine Africano de Argentina (FICAA).

== Filmography ==
- 2012: Sur les traces de Salimata
- 2014: Farafin Ko
- 2017: France-Aurevoir, le nouveau commerce triangulaire
- 2019: Le Loup d'or de Balolé
- 2023: Al Djanat: The Original Paradise

== Awards ==
- 2019, Golden Stallion Prize for “The Golden Wolf of Balolé”
