= Prince Daniel Aboki =

- Citizenship: Nigerian
- Occupations: Broadcast Journalist, Film Director
- Employer(s): Cool FM, Wazobia FM, and Arewa Radio
- Notable work: Mai Martaba

Prince Daniel Aboki is a Nigerian broadcast journalist, film writer, producer and director.

== Career ==
Prince Daniel Aboki works as a broadcast journalist where he is the Programs Director of Cool FM, Wazobia FM, and Arewa Radio and Kids FM which are all situated in Lagos, Nigeria.

He is also a writer, producer and director in the Nigerian movie industry, Nollywood where he has actively had several projects which include

- Nigeria's selection for the 2025 Oscar's Award, Mai Martaba.
- Director of the 2024 drama film, Kaka
- Writer and Director of the 2023 short drama film, Bring Me Flowers

== Awards and recognition ==
- Kaka nominated for Best Indigenous Language (West Africa) at the 2025 Africa Magic Viewers Choice Awards
- Mai Martaba nominated for Best Indigenous Language (West Africa) at the 2025 Africa Magic Viewers Choice Awards

== Nominations ==
1. Best African Film - Septimius Awards 2. Best African Actor - Septimius Awards 3. Best Costume Design - Septimius Awards 4. Best Make-Up & Hairstyling - Septimius Awards

== Awards ==
- Best Costume - The African Film Festival (TAFF), USA,
- Best Nollywood Film - RealTime Film Festival (RTF), United Kingdom,
- Best Nollywood Film - Toronto International Nollywood Film Festival (TINFF), Canada,
- Best Actor * Best Production Design * Best Make-Up - Kano Indigenous Languages of African Film Festival (KILAF)
- Best African Indigenous Language Film - Kaduna International Film Festival (KADIFF),
- Outstanding Music * Score Best Feature (Indigenous) - Abuja International Film Festival (AIFF),
- Best Director * Best Feature Film - Coal City Film Festival (CCFF).

== Nominations ==
1. Best African Indigenous Language Film, AMVCA 2. Ousmane Sembene Award for Best Film in an African Language, AMAA 3. Best Nollywood Film, RTF, UK 4. Best Director, RTF, UK 5. Best Screenplay, RTF, UK 6. Best African Feature Film, RTF, UK 7. Best Nollywood Film, TINFF, Canada 8. Best Actor Nollywood, TINFF, Canada 9. Best Actress Africa, TINFF, Canada 10. Best African Actor, Septimius Awards, Amsterdam, the Netherlands 11. Best Director, KILAF 12. Best Actor, KILAF 13. Best Production Design, KILAF 14. Best Make-Up, KILAF 15. Best Overall African Film, KILAF 16. Best Film West Africa, KILAF 17. Best Supporting Actor, KILAF 18. Best Cinematography, KILAF 19. Best African Indigenous Language Film, KADIFF 20. Best Lead Actor, KADIFF 21. Best Screenplay, KADIFF 22. Best Production Design, KADIFF 23. Best Feature Film, CCFF 24. Best Director, CCFF 25. Outstanding Music Score, AIFF 26. Best Feature: Indigenous, AIFF 27. Best Feature Screenplay, AIFF 28. Outstanding Female Actress, AIFF 29. Golden Jury Film, AIFF
