= Mai Martaba =

2024 Nigerian film directed by Prince Aboki

- Release dates: 2024
- Country: Nigeria
- Language: Hausa

Mai Martaba (Hausa meaning 'Your Highness') is a 2024 Nigerian epic thriller which depicts the culture and tradition of the royal setting in Hausa land. The film was produced and directed by Prince Daniel Aboki. The movie featured only one popular Kannywood actor Adam Zango, as a result of the director wanting to showcase new actors. The film was premiered in Kano in August 2024.

== Plot ==
The film portrays a theme of love, greed, betrayal and royal battle which is a usual occurrence in royal settings in Northern Nigeria, Nigeria and Africa at large. It also highlights the situation in which a female is set to become the Emir, a situation which is not the norm in many parts of Northern Nigeria.

== Cast ==
- Adam Zango
- Fatima Mohammed as Princess Sangaya
- Tasi’u Ali as MaiKabaas Turaki
- Yahaya Sabo Abubakar as Wakili
- Shugaba
- Ghali Abdullah DZ
- Muktar Aminu Haruna
- Auwalu Isma’il Marshal

== Reception ==
- Submitted for the Best International Feature Film category at the 97th Academy Awards
