= Papita, maní, tostón =

- Film poster
- Directed by: Luis Carlos Hueck
- Written by: Luis Carlos Hueck
- Starring: Jean Pierre Agostini; Juliette Pardau
- Cinematography: Carlos Luis Rodríguez
- Edited by: Diego Cardier; Jonathan Pellicer
- Production companies: Centro Nacional Autónomo de Cinematografía; Escotilla Films; Factor RH Producciones
- Distributed by: Cines Unidos
- Release date: December 20, 2013 (Venezuela)
- Running time: 115 minutes
- Country: Venezuela
- Language: Spanish
- Box office: $15,665,693

Papita, maní, tostón is a 2013 Venezuelan sports comedy film written and directed by Luis Carlos Hueck. Starring Juliette Pardau and Jean Pierre Agostini, it narrates the encounter between two eternal baseball teams rivals, a fan of the Leones del Caracas and another of the Navegantes de Magallanes.

It is one of the most watched Venezuelan films in the history of the country, with almost 2 million tickets sold nationally.

== Plot ==
Andrés (Jean Pierre Agostini) is an inveterate fan of the Leones del Caracas one of the most important baseball teams in Venezuela. Julissa (Juliette Pardau) is a fan of the Navegantes del Magallanes, the rival team.

One day Andrés mistakenly gets tickets to see the match in the VIP area of Magallanes. There, he encounters Julissa, a huge fan of his rival team. Both fall in love but, to be together, they will have to pretend to be of the opposite team to the confusion and annoyance of their relatives and friends, causing the most amusing situations.

== Cast ==
- Jean Pierre Agostini as Andrés
- Juliette Pardau as Julissa
- Miguel Ángel Landa as Abuelo
- Vicente Peña as Eduardo
- Vantroy Sánchez as Ricardo
- Juan Andres Belgrave as Felipe
- José Roberto Díaz as Vicente Gallanes
- Antonieta Colón as Tita
- Elias Muñoz as Camacho Magallanero
- Ana Karina Terrero as Chachi
- Amanda Key as Yesaidu
- Emilio Lovera as Hot Dog seller
- Ruggiero Orlando as Tato
- José Quijada as Augusto
- Mascioli Zapata as Samulo

== Reception ==
The film became the highest grossing film in the history of Venezuelan cinema, after reaching 1,979,917 spectators. The news was released by the Centro Nacional Autónomo de Cinematografía (CNAC) through their Twitter account. Luis Carlos Hueck's debut overcame Venezuelan films such as Homicidio culposo, released in 1984 and watched by 1,335,252 spectators, and Macu, la mujer del policía, released in 1987 and watched by 1,180,621 spectators.

On IMDb the film has received an average rating of 6.4/10 from over a thousand users. On FilmAffinity it received a 5.5/10 from over 143 users. Review aggregator Rotten Tomatoes reports that 56% of critics gave the film a positive review, based on based on less than 50 reviews, with an average of 3.3/5 stars.

A sequel titled Papita 2^{da} base, also directed by Luis Carlos Hueck and starring Juliette Pardau, Jean Pierre Agostini and Juan Andrés Belgrave, was released on 2017.
