= List of awards and nominations received by Renate Reinsve =

Renate Reinsve awards and nominations
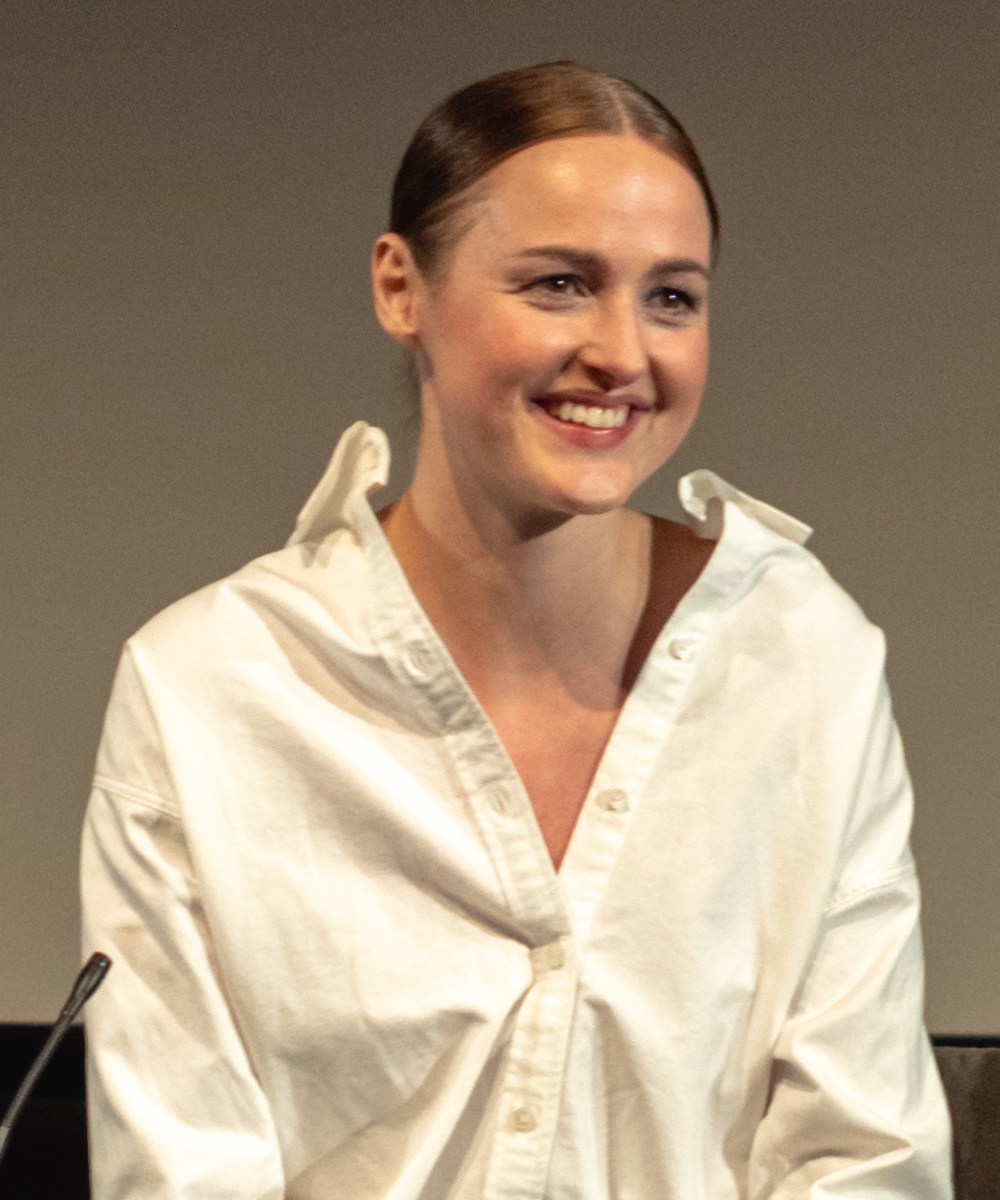
- Reinsve in 2022
Awards and nominations
| Award | Wins | Nominations |
| Academy Awards | 0 | 1 |
| BAFTA Awards | 0 | 2 |
| Critics' Choice Awards | 0 | 2 |
| European Film Awards | 1 | 4 |
| Golden Globe Awards | 0 | 1 |

Totals (Note: Certain award groups do not simply award one winner. They acknowledge several different recipients, have runners-up, and have third place. Since this is a specific recognition and is different from losing an award, runner-up mentions are considered wins in this award tally. For simplification and to avoid errors, each award in this list has been presumed to have had a prior nomination.)
- Wins: 14
- Nominations: 80

The following is a list of awards and nominations received by Norwegian actress Renate Reinsve.

Reinsve broke out with her lead performance in Joachim Trier's romantic comedy-drama film The Worst Person in the World (2021), which won her the Cannes Film Festival Award for Best Actress and earned her nominations for the BAFTA Award for Best Actress in a Leading Role and European Film Award for Best Actress. For her performance as an actress in the midst of a reunion with her estranged father in Trier's next film, Sentimental Value (2025), she won the European Film Award for Best Actress and earned her first nominations for the Academy Award for Best Actress and Golden Globe Award for Best Actress in a Motion Picture - Drama, as well as her second nomination for the BAFTA Award for Best Actress in a Leading Role.

== Major associations ==
=== Academy Awards ===
| Year | Category | Nominated work | Result | Ref. |
|---|---|---|---|---|
| 2026 | Best Actress | Sentimental Value | Nominated | |

=== BAFTA Awards ===
| Year | Category | Nominated work | Result | Ref. |
British Academy Film Awards
| 2022 | Best Actress in a Leading Role | The Worst Person in the World | Nominated | |
| 2026 | Best Actress in a Leading Role | Sentimental Value | Nominated | |

=== Critics' Choice Awards ===
| Year | Category | Nominated work | Result | Ref. |
Critics' Choice Movie Awards
| 2026 | Best Actress | Sentimental Value | Nominated | |
Critics' Choice Super Awards
| 2026 | Best Actress in a Horror Movie | Backrooms | Nominated | |

=== European Film Awards ===
| Year | Category | Nominated work | Result | Ref. |
|---|---|---|---|---|
| 2021 | European Actress | The Worst Person in the World | Nominated | |
| 2024 | European Actress | Armand | Nominated | |
| 2026 | European Actress | Sentimental Value | Won | |
| 2027 | European Actress | Fjord | Pending | |

=== Golden Globe Awards ===
| Year | Category | Nominated work | Result | Ref. |
|---|---|---|---|---|
| 2026 | Best Actress in a Motion Picture – Drama | Sentimental Value | Nominated | |

== Miscellaneous awards ==
| Award | Year | Category | Nominated work | Result | Ref. |
|---|---|---|---|---|---|
| AACTA International Awards | 2026 | Best Actress | Sentimental Value | Nominated | |
| Alliance of Women Film Journalists | 2022 | Most Daring Performance | The Worst Person in the World | Nominated | |
| Alliance of Women Film Journalists | 2022 | Best Woman's Breakthrough Performance | The Worst Person in the World | Nominated | |
| Alliance of Women Film Journalists | 2026 | Best Actress | Sentimental Value | Nominated | |
| Amanda Awards | 2016 | Best Supporting Actress | Welcome to Norway | Nominated | |
| Amanda Awards | 2022 | Best Actress | The Worst Person in the World | Won | |
| Amanda Awards | 2025 | Best Actor in a Leading Role | Armand | Nominated | |
| Amanda Awards | 2026 | Best Actor in a Leading Role | Sentimental Value | Nominated | |
| Astra Film Awards | 2026 | Best Actress - Drama | Sentimental Value | Nominated | |
| Astra Film Awards | 2026 | Best Cast Ensemble | Sentimental Value | Nominated (Note: Shared with the cast.) | |
| Astra Midseason Movie Awards | 2026 | Best Supporting Actress | Backrooms | Nominated | |
| Cannes Film Festival | 2021 | Best Actress | The Worst Person in the World | Won | |
| Columbus Film Critics Association | 2026 | Best Lead Performance | Sentimental Value | Nominated | |
| Critics Association of Central Florida | 2021 | Best Actress | The Worst Person in the World | Won | |
| Dallas–Fort Worth Film Critics Association | 2025 | Best Actress | Sentimental Value | 3rd place | |
| Denver Film Critics Society | 2026 | Best Actress | Sentimental Value | Nominated | |
| DiscussingFilm Critic Awards | 2022 | Best Actress | The Worst Person in the World | Nominated | |
| DiscussingFilm Critic Awards | 2026 | Best Actress | Sentimental Value | Nominated | |
| Dorian Awards | 2022 | Film Performance of the Year | The Worst Person in the World | Nominated | |
| Dorian Awards | 2026 | Film Performance of the Year | Sentimental Value | Nominated | |
| Dublin Film Critics Circle | 2025 | Best Actress | Sentimental Value | 2nd place | |
| Florida Film Critics Circle | 2025 | Best Ensemble | Sentimental Value | Nominated | |
| Georgia Film Critics Association | 2025 | Best Actress | Sentimental Value | Runner-up | |
| Georgia Film Critics Association | 2025 | Best Ensemble | Sentimental Value | Nominated | |
| Greater Western New York Film Critics Association | 2021 | Best Actress | The Worst Person in the World | Nominated | |
| Greater Western New York Film Critics Association | 2026 | Best Actress | Sentimental Value | Nominated | |
| Greater Western New York Film Critics Association | 2026 | Best Ensemble | Sentimental Value | Nominated | |
| Hawaii Film Critics Society | 2026 | Best Actress | Sentimental Value | Nominated | |
| Houston Film Critics Society | 2026 | Best Actress | Sentimental Value | Nominated | |
| Houston Film Critics Society | 2026 | Best Ensemble | Sentimental Value | Nominated | |
| IndieWire Critics Poll | 2021 | Best Performance | The Worst Person in the World | 3rd place | |
| IndieWire Critics Poll | 2025 | Best Performance | Sentimental Value | 10th place | |
| Irish Film & Television Awards | 2026 | Best International Actress | Sentimental Value | Nominated | |
| Kansas City Film Critics Circle | 2025 | Best Actress | Sentimental Value | Nominated | |
| Las Vegas Film Critics Society | 2025 | Best Actress | Sentimental Value | Nominated | |
| Las Vegas Film Critics Society | 2025 | Best Ensemble | Sentimental Value | Nominated | |
| Los Angeles Film Critics Association | 2021 | Best Actress | The Worst Person in the World | Runner-up | |
| London Film Critics' Circle | 2022 | Actress of the Year | The Worst Person in the World | Nominated | |
| London Film Critics' Circle | 2026 | Actress of the Year | Sentimental Value | Nominated | |
| Minnesota Film Critics Association | 2026 | Best Actress | Sentimental Value | Nominated | |
| Minnesota Film Critics Association | 2026 | Best Ensemble | Sentimental Value | Nominated | |
| Music City Film Critics Association | 2026 | Best Acting Ensemble | Sentimental Value | Nominated | |
| National Society of Film Critics | 2022 | Best Actress | The Worst Person in the World | 2nd place | |
| National Society of Film Critics | 2026 | Best Actress | Sentimental Value | 3rd place | |
| New York Film Critics Online | 2025 | Best Actress | Sentimental Value | Nominated | |
| New York Film Critics Online | 2025 | Best Ensemble Cast | Sentimental Value | Nominated | |
| North Carolina Film Critics Association | 2022 | Best Actress | The Worst Person in the World | Nominated | |
| North Carolina Film Critics Association | 2026 | Best Acting Ensemble | Sentimental Value | Nominated | |
| North Dakota Film Society | 2022 | Best Actress | The Worst Person in the World | Nominated | |
| North Dakota Film Society | 2026 | Best Actress | Sentimental Value | Nominated | |
| North Dakota Film Society | 2026 | Best Ensemble | Sentimental Value | Nominated | |
| North Texas Film Critics Association | 2025 | Best Actress | Sentimental Value | Nominated | |
| Online Association of Female Film Critics | 2021 | Best Actress | The Worst Person in the World | Nominated | |
| Online Association of Female Film Critics | 2025 | Best Actress | Sentimental Value | Nominated | |
| Online Association of Female Film Critics | 2025 | Best Ensemble | Sentimental Value | Nominated | |
| Online Film Critics Society | 2022 | Best Actress | The Worst Person in the World | Nominated | |
| Online Film Critics Society | 2026 | Best Actress | Sentimental Value | Nominated | |
| Online Film Critics Society | 2026 | Best Ensemble & Casting | Sentimental Value | Nominated | |
| Palm Springs International Film Festival | 2026 | International Star Award | Sentimental Value | Honored (Note: Shared with Stellan Skarsgård, Inga Ibsdotter Lilleaas and Elle Fanning.) | |
| Portland Critics Association | 2021 | Best Female Leading Role | The Worst Person in the World | Nominated | |
| San Diego Film Critics Society | 2025 | Best Actress | Sentimental Value | Nominated | |
| San Francisco Bay Area Film Critics Circle | 2025 | Best Actress | Sentimental Value | Nominated | |
| Santa Barbara International Film Festival | 2026 | Virtuosos Award | Sentimental Value | Won | |
| Satellite Awards | 2022 | Best Actress in a Motion Picture - Comedy or Musical | The Worst Person in the World | Nominated | |
| Satellite Awards | 2026 | Best Actress in a Motion Picture - Drama | Sentimental Value | Nominated | |
| Seattle Film Critics Society | 2021 | Best Actress | The Worst Person in the World | Nominated | |
| Utah Film Critics Association | 2026 | Best Lead Performance - Female | Sentimental Value | Nominated | |
| Utah Film Critics Association | 2026 | Best Ensemble | Sentimental Value | Nominated | |
| Vancouver Film Critics Circle | 2022 | Best Actress | The Worst Person in the World | Nominated | |
| Vancouver Film Critics Circle | 2026 | Best Actress | Sentimental Value | Nominated | |
| Washington DC Area Film Critics Association | 2025 | Best Actress | Sentimental Value | Nominated | |
| Washington DC Area Film Critics Association | 2025 | Best Ensemble | Sentimental Value | Nominated | |
