= Helseth =

Helseth is a surname. Notable people with the surname include:

- Are Helseth (born 1955), Norwegian physician, health administrator and politician
- Hovel Helseth (1779–1865), Norwegian industrial entrepreneur and politician
- Martin Helseth (born 1994), Norwegian competitive rower
- Randi Helseth (1905–1991), Norwegian singer
- Tine Thing Helseth (born 1987), Norwegian trumpet soloist
