= Renate Reinsve =

Norwegian actress (born 1987)

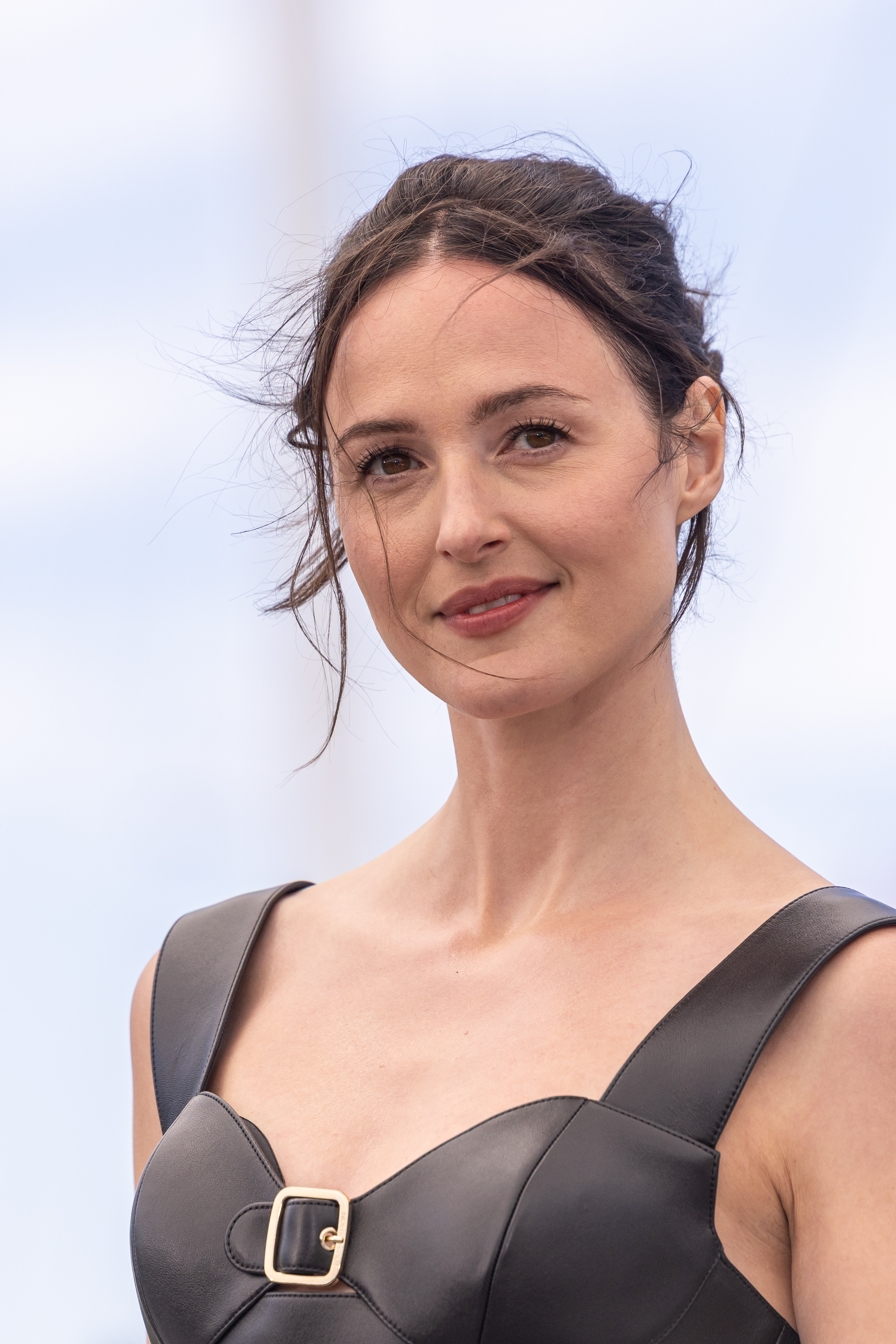
- Reinsve at the 2025 Cannes Film Festival
- Born: 24 November 1987 (age 38); Solbergelva, Buskerud, Norway
- Education: Oslo National Academy of the Arts
- Occupation: Actress
- Years active: 2011–present
- Children: 1
- Awards: Full list

Signature
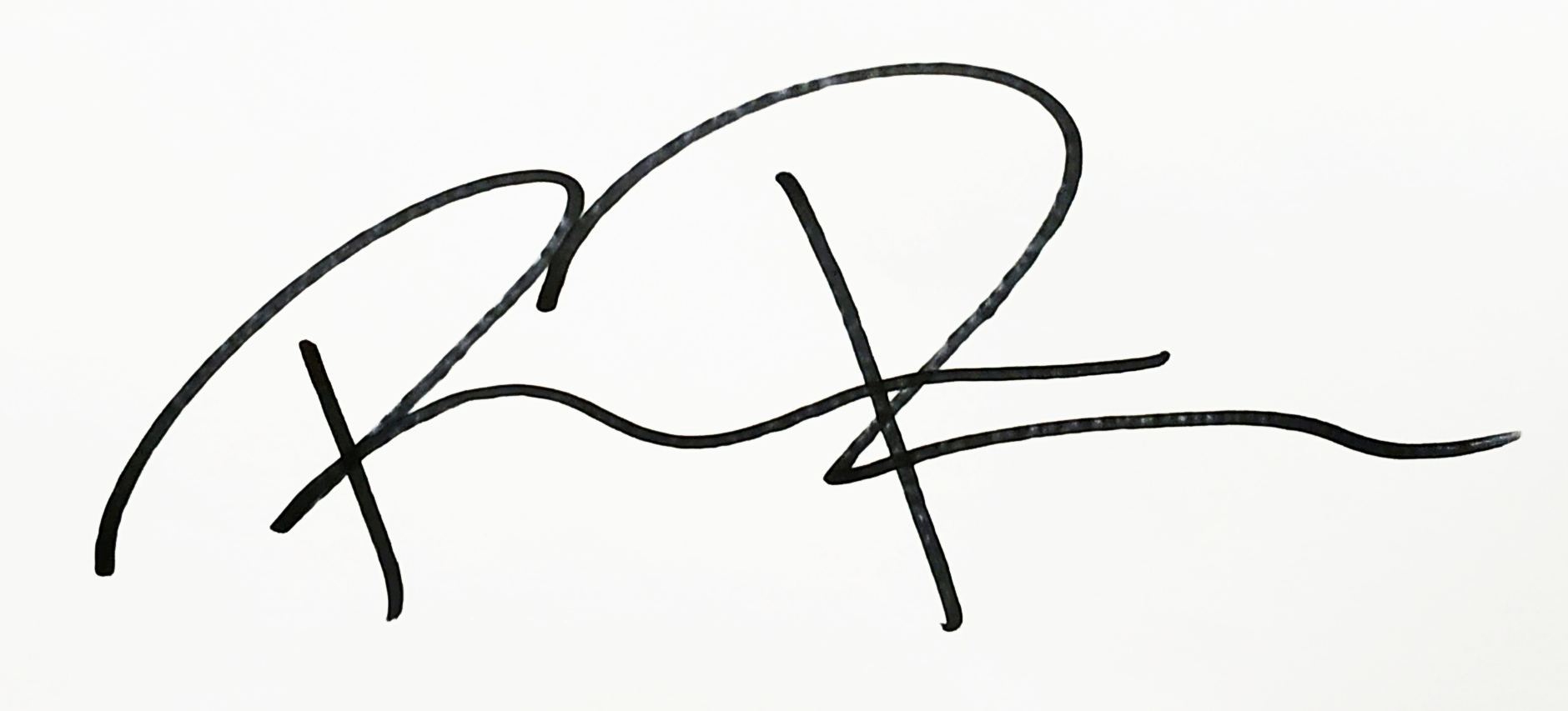

Renate Reinsve (Norwegian: [rɛˈnɑ̀ːtə ˈræ̀ɪnˌsveː]; born 24 November 1987) is a Norwegian actress. She made her feature film debut in Joachim Trier's Oslo, August 31st (2011) and gained international recognition for her starring role in Trier's romantic comedy-drama The Worst Person in the World (2021). For her performance in the latter she won the Cannes Film Festival Award for Best Actress and received nomination for the British Academy Film Award for Best Actress. She gained further critical acclaim for her role as a troubled actress reuniting with her father in Trier's family drama Sentimental Value (2025) which earned her nominations for the Academy Award, the Golden Globe Award and another British Academy Film Award for Best Actress.

Her other film credits include the psychological dark comedy A Different Man (2024), the thriller Armand (2024), the science-fiction romance Another End (2024), the drama Fjord (2026), which won the Palme d'Or at the Cannes Film Festival, and the science-fiction horror film Backrooms (2026). On television, she appeared in the Apple TV+ legal thriller series Presumed Innocent (2024).

Educated at the Oslo National Academy of the Arts, she began her career on stage at Trøndelag Teater in Trondheim before joining Det Norske Teatret in Oslo in 2016.

== Early life ==
Born in Solbergelva, a suburb of Drammen, and educated at the Oslo National Academy of the Arts, Reinsve then joined the Trøndelag Teater in Trondheim, Norway.

After being expelled from school at 16, Reinsve left Norway for Scotland and stayed in a hostel in Edinburgh. Running out of money, she was given a job in the hostel bar by the manager who "felt sorry for [her]".

== Career ==
=== 2011–2020: Film debut and early work ===
In 2014, she received the Hedda Award for her role in Besøk av gammel dame, an adaptation of Friedrich Dürrenmatt's play Der Besuch der alten Dame. Since 2016, she has been contracted to Det Norske Teatret in Oslo. Her films include Oslo, August 31st, The Orheim Company (2012), and Welcome to Norway (2016). On television, she has been a main character in Nesten voksen and a side character in Hvite gutter.

=== 2021–present: Breakthrough and expansion ===
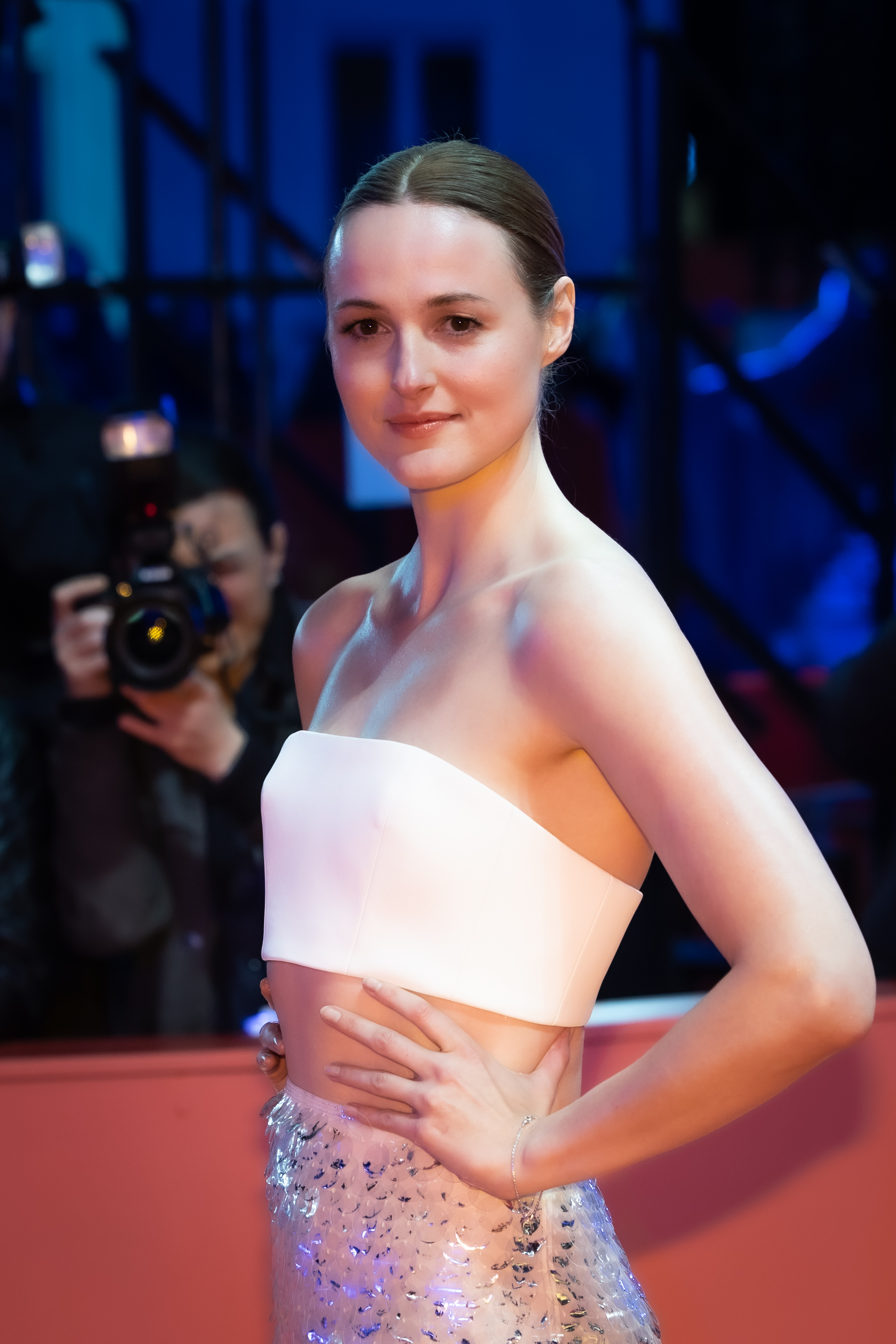
Reinsve at the 2024 Berlinale

In 2021, Reinsve played the principal character Julie in Joachim Trier's romantic comedy-drama The Worst Person in the World, which premiered at the 2021 Cannes Film Festival to widespread critical acclaim. On Late Night with Seth Meyers, Reinsve said that she was considering quitting acting the day before she was offered the role of Julie, and had considered working in carpentry as a backup plan to acting. Trier had written the part of Julie specifically for her. Peter Bradshaw of The Guardian lauded the film giving it a five star review declaring, "Renate Reinsve is the actor who takes on this role and she takes off like a rocket, deserving star status to rival Lily James or Alicia Vikander for her tremendously mature, sensitive and sympathetic performance." For her performance, Reinsve received the Cannes Film Festival Award for Best Actress and was nominated for the BAFTA Award for Best Actress in a Leading Role.

Reinsve acted in two movies which competed at the 74th Berlin International Film Festival, the first being Aaron Schimberg's psychological drama A Different Man co-starring opposite Sebastian Stan. The second was Piero Messina's science-fiction romance Another End with Gael Garcia Bernal. Reinsve acted in the film Armand directed by Halfdan Ullmann Tøndel which premiered at the 2024 Cannes Film Festival. In Nordisk, Armand was said to be "A story about boundaries - not mainly between the kids, but between the adults involved. Who decides where to set them? What is an assault, what is play, what is consent, and what is privacy?". She was nominated for the European Film Award for Best Actress for her performance. Also in 2024, she played a lover and victim in the Apple TV+ legal thriller series Presumed Innocent acting opposite Jake Gyllenhaal. The series was based on the 1987 novel.

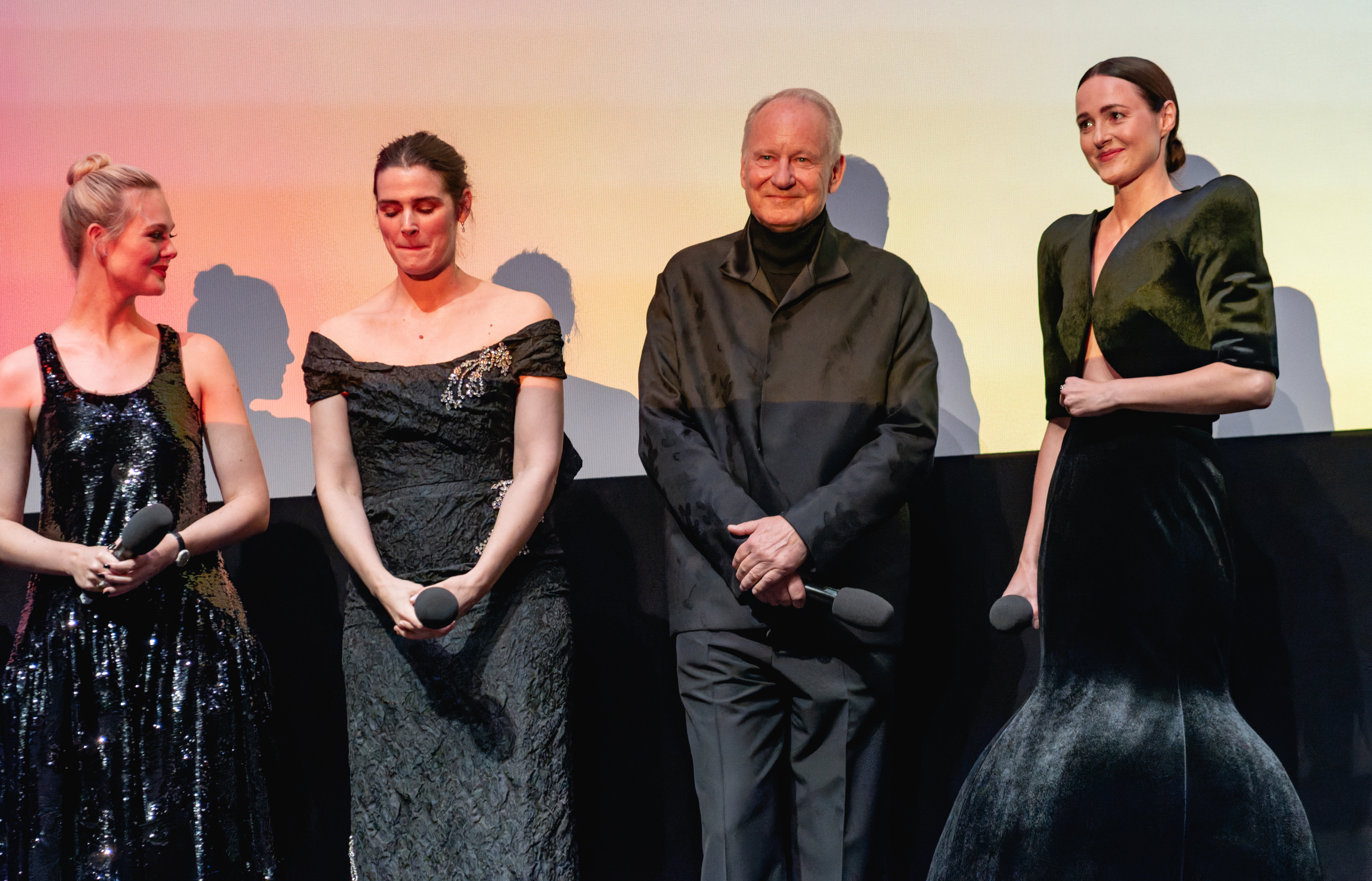
Elle Fanning, Inga Ibsdotter Lilleaas, Stellan Skarsgård and Reinsve promoting Sentimental Value in 2025

Reinsve reunited with Trier for the family drama Sentimental Value starring alongside Stellan Skarsgård, Inga Ibsdotter Lilleaas and Elle Fanning. Filming commenced in August 2024. The film premiered at the 2025 Cannes Film Festival to positive reviews. David Ehlrich of IndieWire praised her collaboration with the director: "Reinsve is immaculately attuned to Trier's energy, and Sentimental Value is carried by the manic frustration she brings to her part". David Rooney of The Hollywood Reporter concurred: "It's especially gladdening to see Reinsve working again with a director who draws out every ounce of raw feeling in her" while also praising her for her dramatic and comedic abilities. For her performance she was nominated for the Academy Award, BAFTA Award, and the Golden Globe Award for Best Actress, becoming the second Norwegian Oscar nominee in the category.

In June 2025, it was announced that Reinsve would star opposite Chiwetel Ejiofor in the A24 science-fiction film Backrooms directed by Kane Parsons. In 2026, she reunited with Sebastian Stan in the Cristian Mungiu-directed drama Fjord, which premiered at the Cannes Film Festival. Pete Hammond of Deadline Hollywood praised the leading performances, describing them both as being "excellent" and that they are "never going for melodrama but keeping it real as their world comes crashing down around them". The film went on to win the Palme d'Or. In September 2026, it was announced Reinsve would portray Mary Wollstonecraft in Mia Hansen-Løve’s epic and intimate period drama If Love Should Die starring alongside Vicky Krieps.

== Personal life ==
During a November 2025 interview with Vogue, Reinsve revealed that she has a six-year-old son with her former boyfriend, animator Julian Nazario Vargas. A week later at the ELLE "Women In Hollywood" event, she mentioned him in a speech: "My son is such a wonderful person, so sensitive and strong and cool, and I'm so happy to have him here." On November 26, 2025, during an appearance on Late Night with Seth Meyers, she spoke of having been kicked out of the Girl Scouts; the leader of the troop suggested that she get involved in theater. She also worked at her family's hardware store. According to Reinsve, she was uninterested in working there and was dismissed from employment at the business.

Reinsve was diagnosed with ADHD as a child and has linked the condition to the way she hyperfocused on theatre as a teenager.

== Filmography ==
=== Film ===
Key
| † | Denotes productions which have not yet been released |

| Year | Title | Role | Notes |
|---|---|---|---|
| 2011 | Oslo, August 31st | Renate | |
| 2012 | The Orheim Company | Lene | |
| 2015 | Women in Oversized Men's Shirts | Ane | |
| 2015 | Villmark Asylum | Synne | |
| 2016 | Welcome to Norway | Line | |
| 2017 | Ekspedisjon Knerten | Mor | |
| 2018 | Phoenix | Kristin | |
| 2021 | The Worst Person in the World | Julie | |
| 2024 | Handling the Undead | Anna | |
| 2024 | A Different Man | Ingrid Vold | Hollywood debut |
| 2024 | Another End | Zoe / Ava | |
| 2024 | Armand | Elizabeth | Also executive producer |
| 2025 | Sentimental Value | Nora Borg | Also executive producer |
| 2026 | Butterfly | Lily | |
| 2026 | Fjord | Lisbet Gheorghiu | |
| 2026 | Backrooms | Dr. Mary Kline | |
| 2027 | Somewhere Out There | TBA | Filming |
| TBA | If Love Should Die | Mary Wollstonecraft | Filming |

=== Television ===
| Year | Title | Role | Notes |
|---|---|---|---|
| 2015 | Mysteriet på Sommerbåten | Aktuar | Television series |
| 2015 | Unge lovende | —N/a | Episode #1.1 |
| 2018 | Nesten voksen | Siri | 3 episodes |
| 2018 | Roeng | Lena | 10 episodes |
| 2018 | Best: Før | Anemone | Episode: "Pop-up festival" |
| 2018–2021 | Hvite gutter | Frida | 13 episodes |
| 2022 | Ida tar ansvar | Sarah | Episode: "Et dukkehjem" |
| 2024 | Presumed Innocent | Carolyn Polhemus | 8 episodes |

== See also ==
- List of Nordic Academy Award winners and nominees
- List of actors nominated for Academy Awards for non-English performances
- List of actors with Academy Award nominations
