= In Limbo (2024 film) =

2024 documentary film by Alina Maksimenko

- Promotional poster
- Polish: W zawieszeniu
- Directed by: Alina Maksimenko
- Produced by: Filip Marczewski
- Cinematography: Alina Maksimenko
- Edited by: Feliks Mamczur
- Music by: Vladimir Tarasov
- Production company: Wajda Studio
- Release date: 14 April 2024 (Visions du Réel)
- Running time: 71 minutes
- Country: Poland
- Languages: Ukrainian; Russian

In Limbo (Polish: W zawieszeniu) is a 2024 Polish documentary film directed by Alina Maksimenko. It premiered at Visions du Réel on 14 April 2024. It was nominated for Best Film and Best Documentary at the 37th European Film Awards.

== Premise ==
Alina, recovering from a recent surgery, is living in Irpin when Russia invades Ukraine in early 2022. On 5 March, amid the Battle of Irpin, she manages to escape to a nearby village with her parents, Anatoliy and Tatiana. The film documents their early days of sheltering.

== Production ==
Regarding the film, Maksimenko stated:

The axis of the film are my video notes from the first days of the war, documented in the form of a kind of diary, in which I tried to record my own thoughts and emotions. To understand what was really happening, what this war was, which I and the people around me had known so far only from books, films and stories, and which suddenly became our terrible reality.

== Release ==
The film premiered at Visions du Réel on 14 April 2024. It was later screened at Millennium Docs Against Gravity.

== Awards and nominations ==
Award	Year	Category	Result	Ref.
DMZ International Documentary Film Festival	2024	White Goose	Won	
European Film Awards	2024	Best Film	Nominated	
European Film Awards	2024	Best Documentary	Nominated	
Visions du Réel	2024	Grand Prix	Nominated	
