= Hovel Helseth =

Norwegian entrepreneur and politician

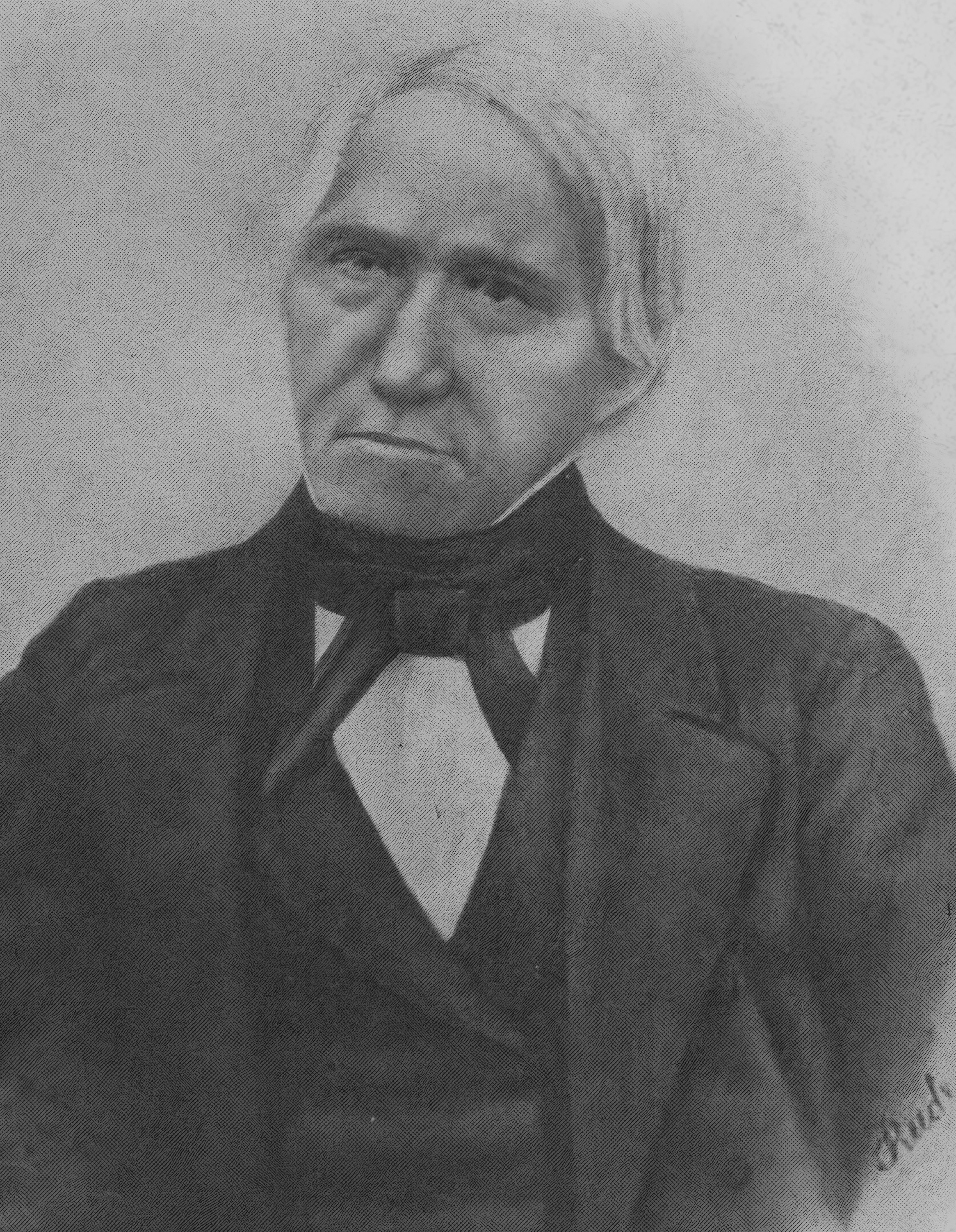
Hovel Helseth

Hovel Helseth (27 August 1779 – 8 November 1865) was a Norwegian industrial entrepreneur and politician. He was a pioneer in the Norwegian textile industry in the first half of the 1800s.

== Background ==
Helseth was born at Nes (now part of Ringsaker Municipality) in Hedmark county, Norway. He was employed by the Teisners merchant trading firm in Kongsberg (1799–1806) and was a teacher at Alunverkets skole in Christiania (1806–1811).

== Career ==
In 1818, Helseth founded a cotton-spinning firm in Drammen (Drammens Bomuldsspinderi) along with local Haugean (haugianere) businessmen; Hans Nielsen Hauge was an initial investor. In 1821, the company was moved to Solbergelva in Nedre Eiker. The Solberg spinning mill (Solberg Spinderi) harnessed the power of Solberg watercourse (Solbergvassdraget) and became Norway's first producer of mechanically spun yarn.

In 1833, Helseth, the sole owner of Solberg Spinderi, made efforts to improve operations. He toured similar operations in Sweden, Belgium and the Netherlands. To finance new machines for the mill, he found it necessary to sell two-thirds of the company. In 1844, along with the new owners, he acquired new machines from Manchester, England, beginning a period of increasing production and profits. In 1857 he sold his interest in the mill and bought a farm in Eiker, where he moved five years later.

He was a deputy to the Norwegian Parliament in 1821, a member of the city council for Drammen (1818–1822), and the deputy mayor of Nedre Eiker Municipality (1837–1841). He died in 1865 and was buried in the churchyard of Nedre Eiker Church (Nedre Eiker kirke).
