= Solbergelva =

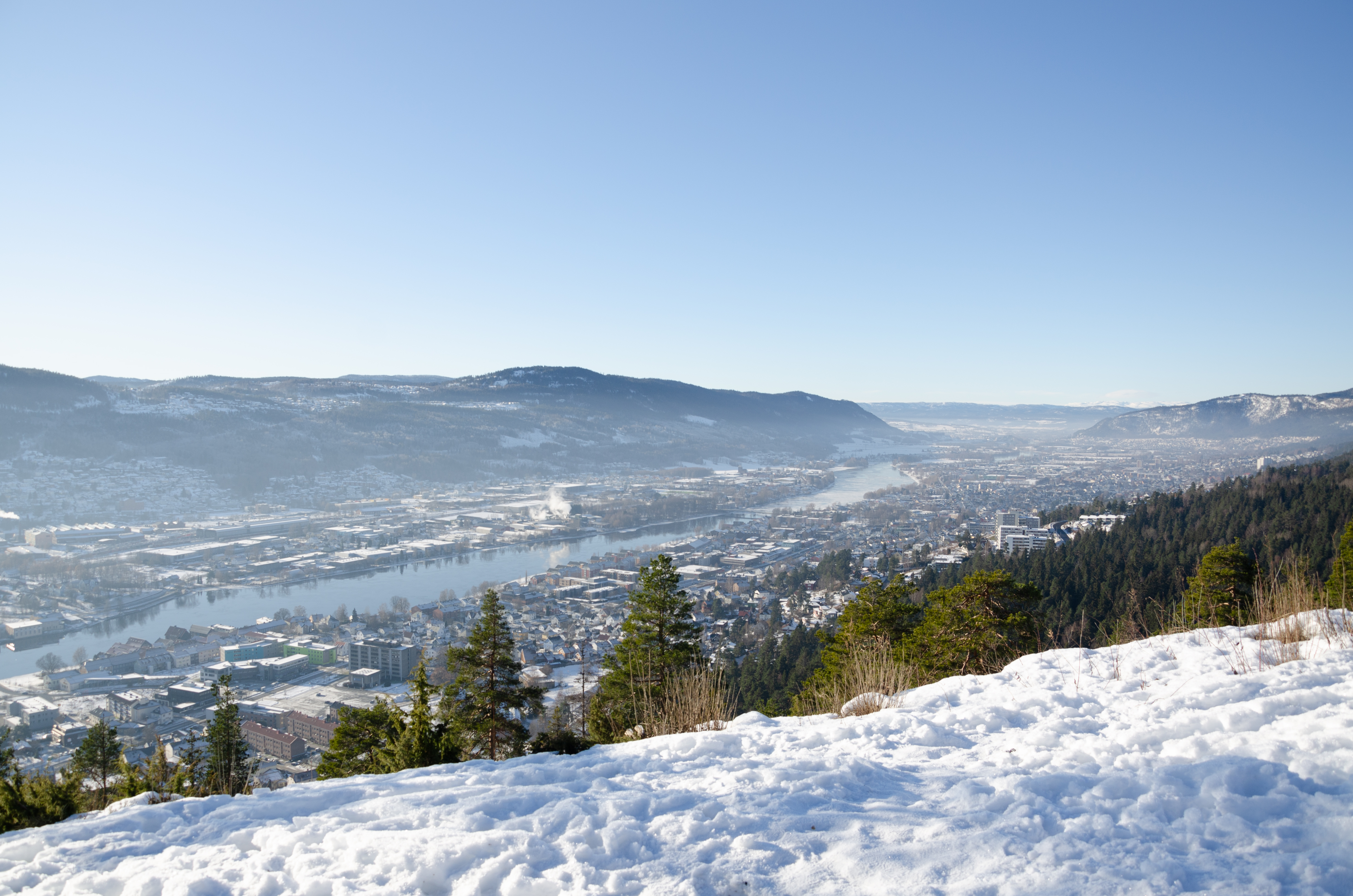
- Solbergelva seen from Drammen. The suburb is in the top right corner, below the hills.

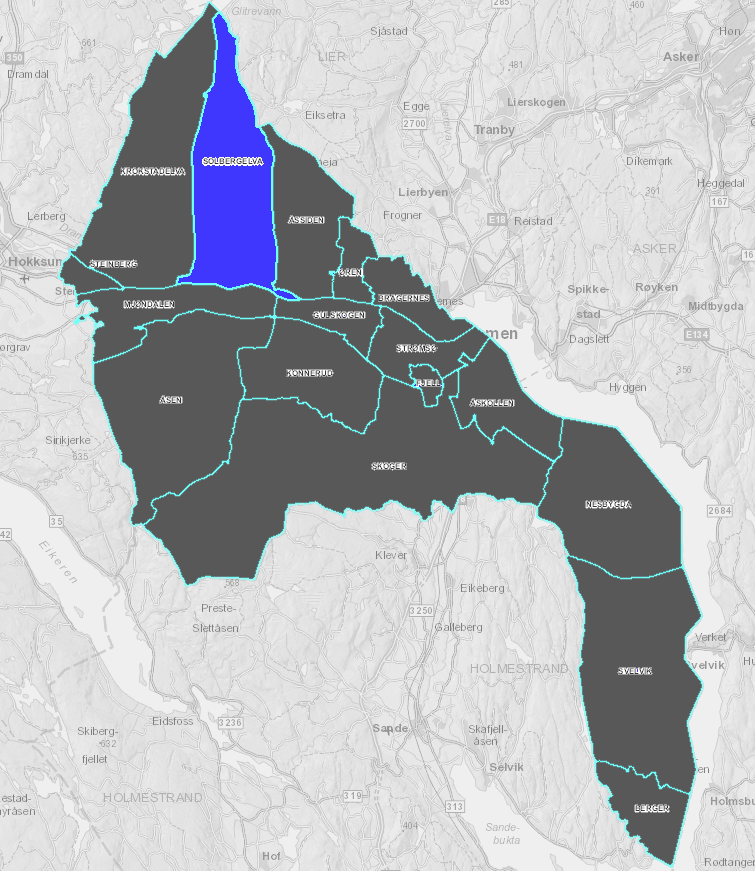
- Coordinates: 59.7630518°N 10.0958713°E
- Country: Norway
- City: Drammen
- Demonym: Solbergelving
- Time zone: CET
- Postal code: 3057
- ISO 3166 code: NO-030106

Solbergelva is a village in Drammen municipality in Buskerud, Norway. It lies north of Drammenselva, approximately five miles west of Bragernes, between Åssiden in the east and Krokstadelva in the west with Solbergfjellet north. In 2017, Solbergelva's population was about 6,000.

In the center of Solbergelva lies Solberg skole (school), Killingrud ungdomsskole, Solbergsentret (shopping center), Solberg sport-og kultursenter (sports and cultural center), sports facilities, Solberg kapell (chapel), and Solberg spinderi. Solbergelva hosts Solbergfestivalen, its own festival at the end of May each year. Solberg SK is one of the leading bandy teams in Norway.

== History ==
The name stems from the farm Solberg and partly means a hill where the sun goes down.

=== Solberg spinderi ===
Solberg Spinderi was founded in 1818 under the name Drammens Bomuldsspinneri. The enterprise was founded by Hovel Helseth and three other Drammen merchants who were supporters of Hans Nielsen Hauge, a lay preacher. In 1821, the company moved to Solbergelva in order to be able to take advantage of hydropower resources.

The history of Solbergelva is closely linked to Solberg Spinderi, a company which for many years employed a substantial part of the local workforce and were responsible for the development of housing for the employees. Near the company there was a separate community with schools, chapels, housing, and social care. Solberg spinderi is one of Norway's oldest companies and is still in Solbergelva.

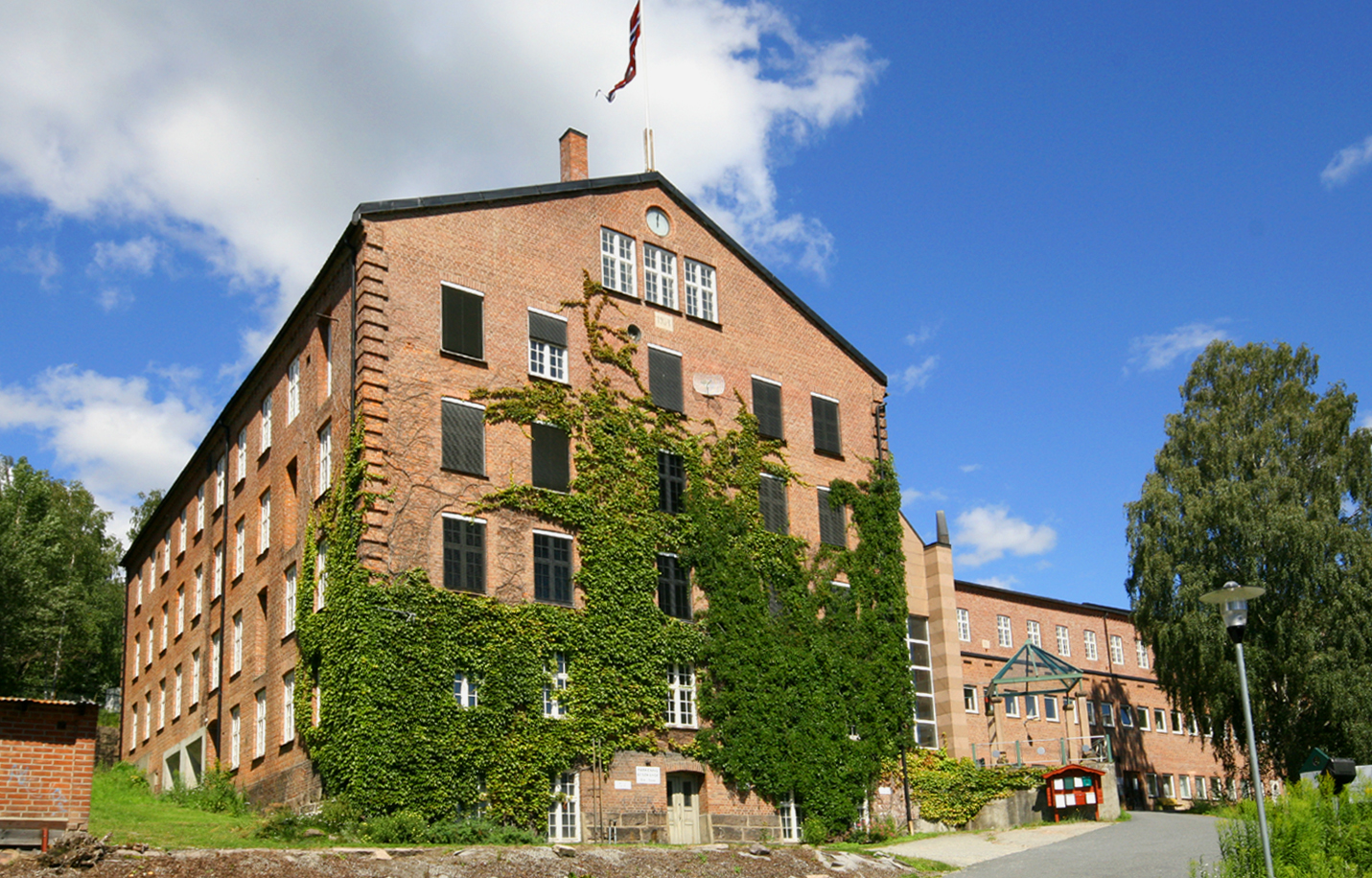
Weaving mill at Solberg Spinderi which closed in 2006

== Gallery ==
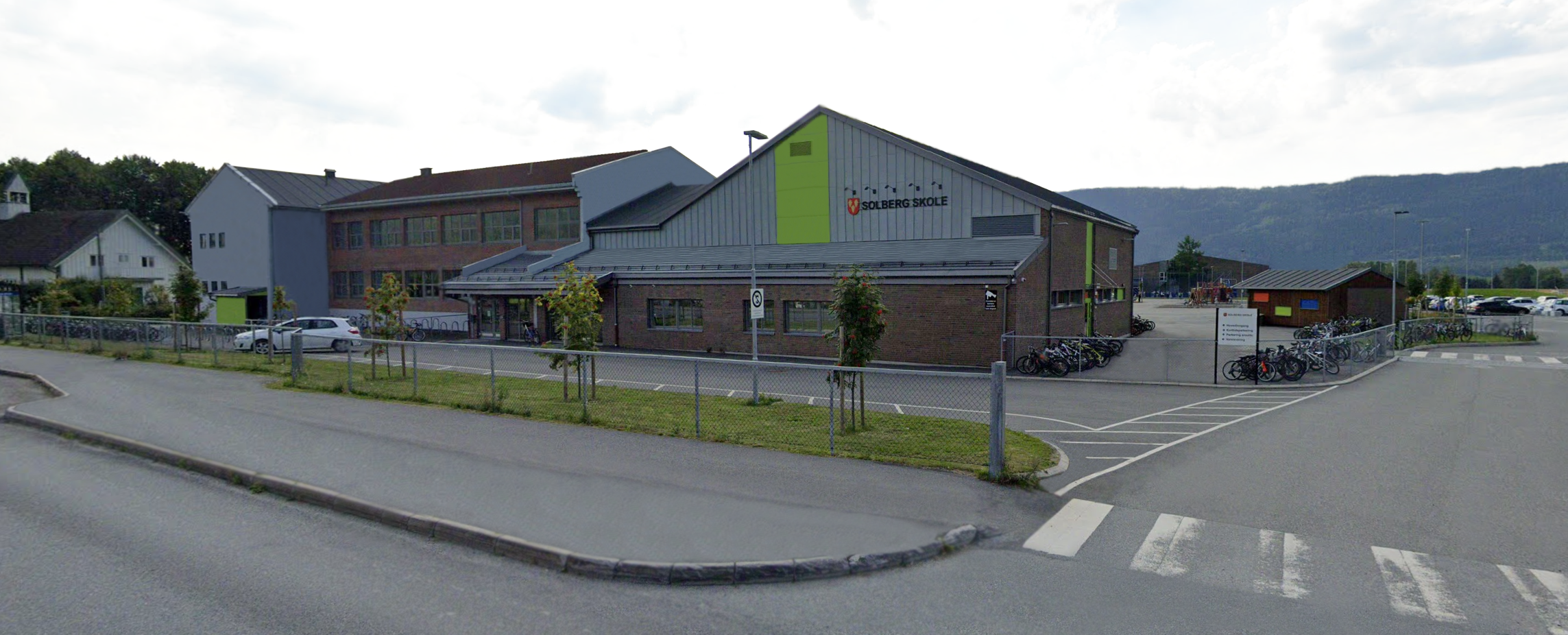
Solberg school

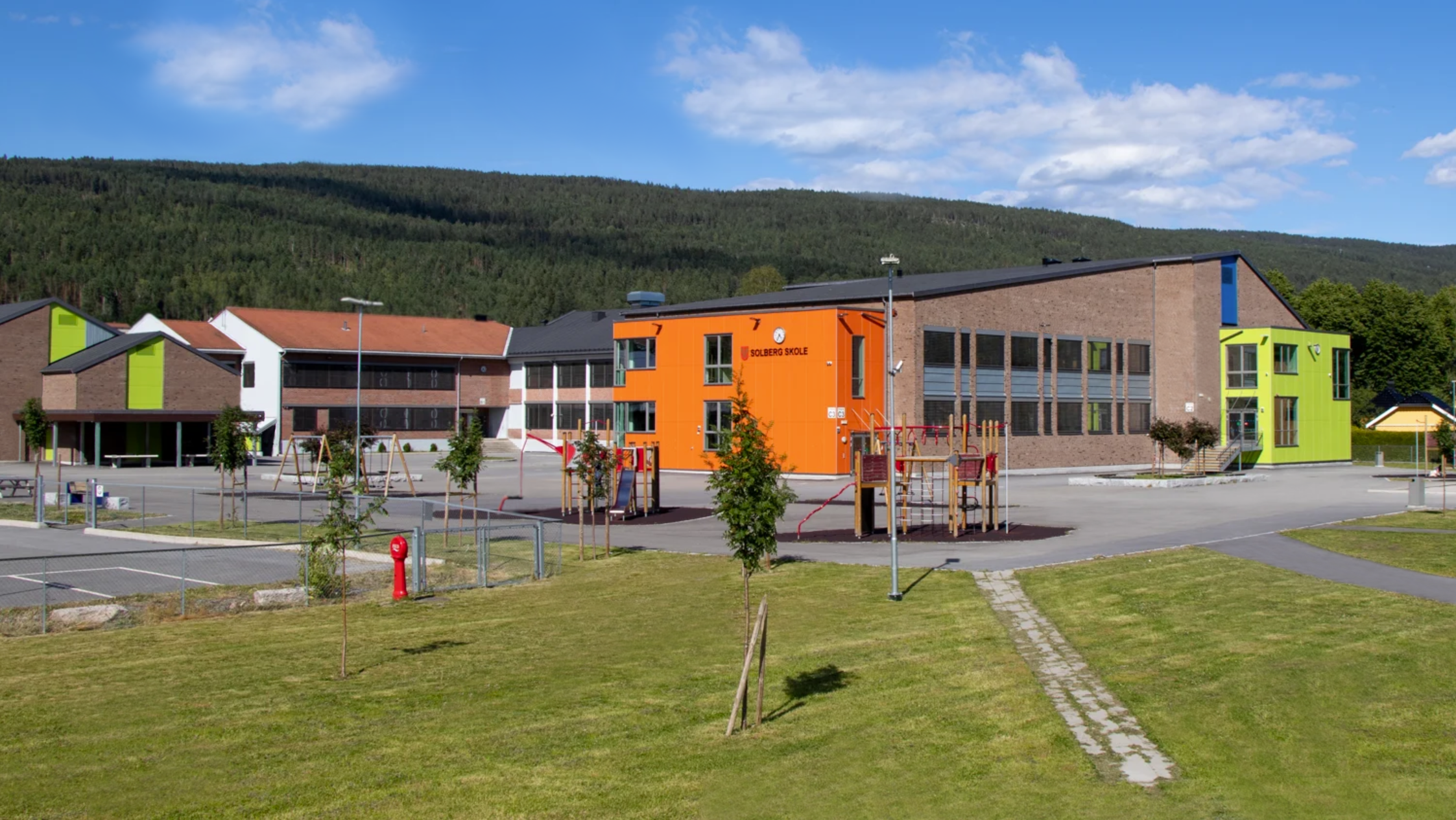
Solberg school

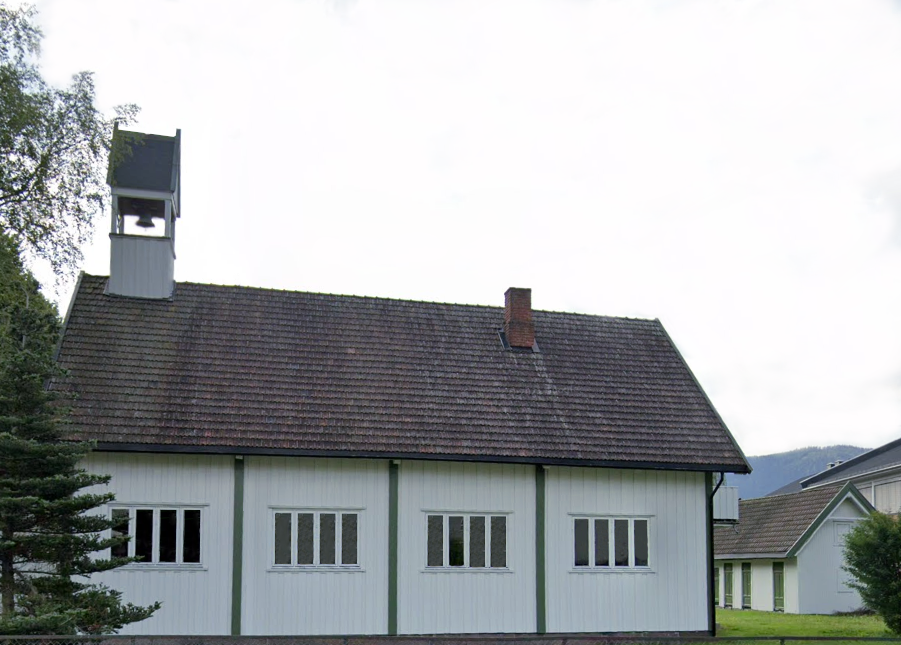
Solberg chapel Fredtun

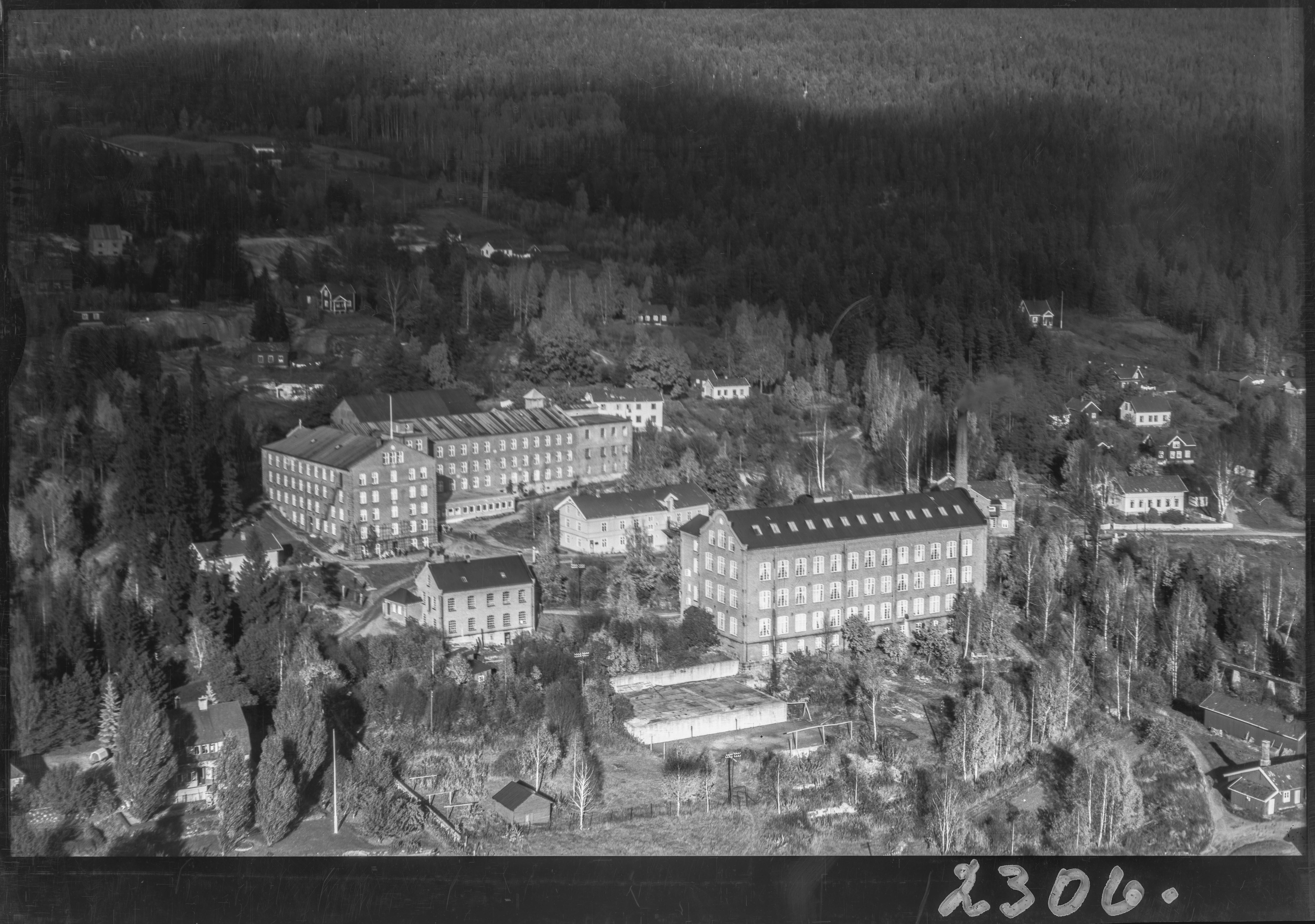
Solberg spinderi

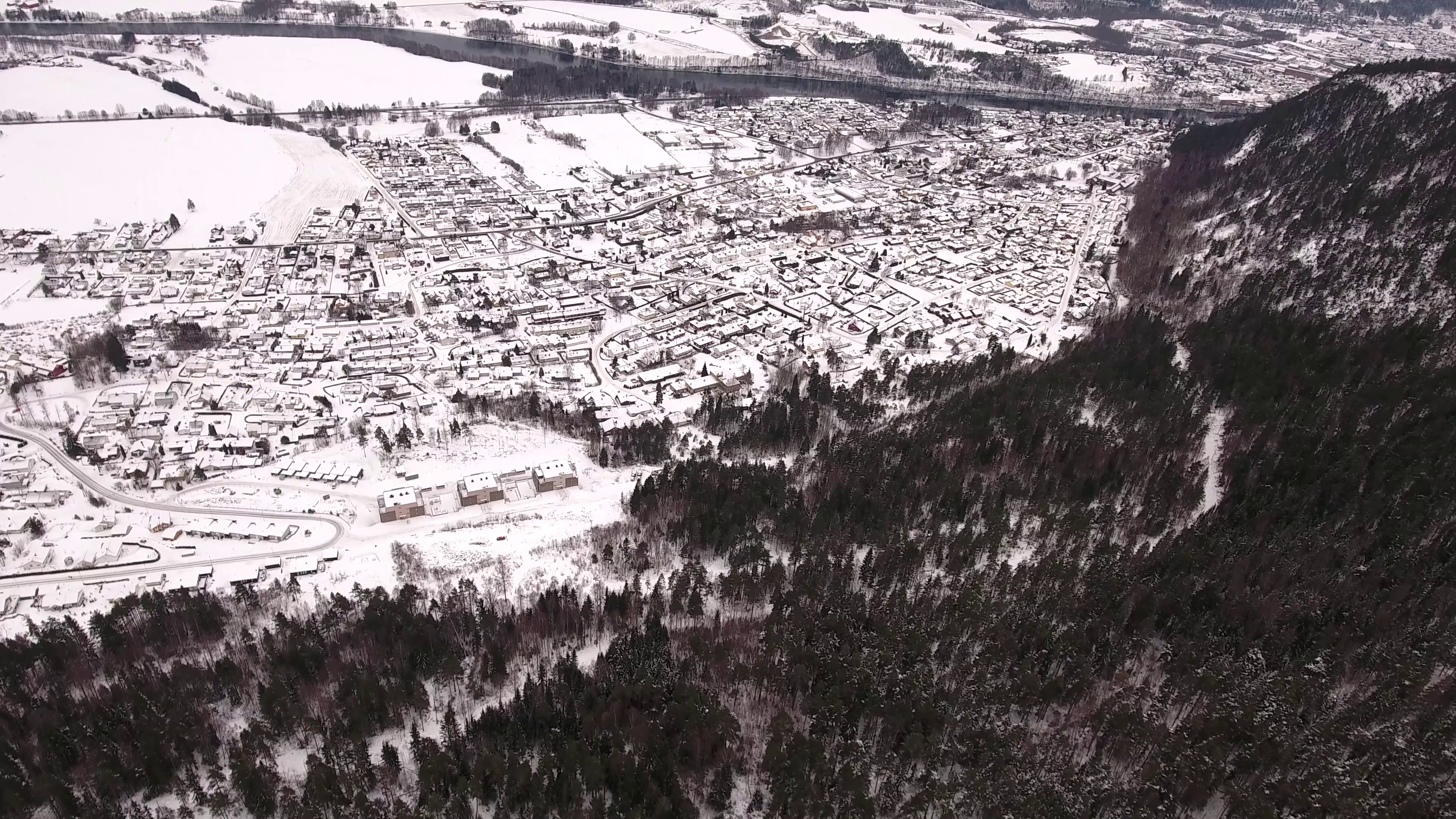
Solbergelva, seen from Solbergfjellet

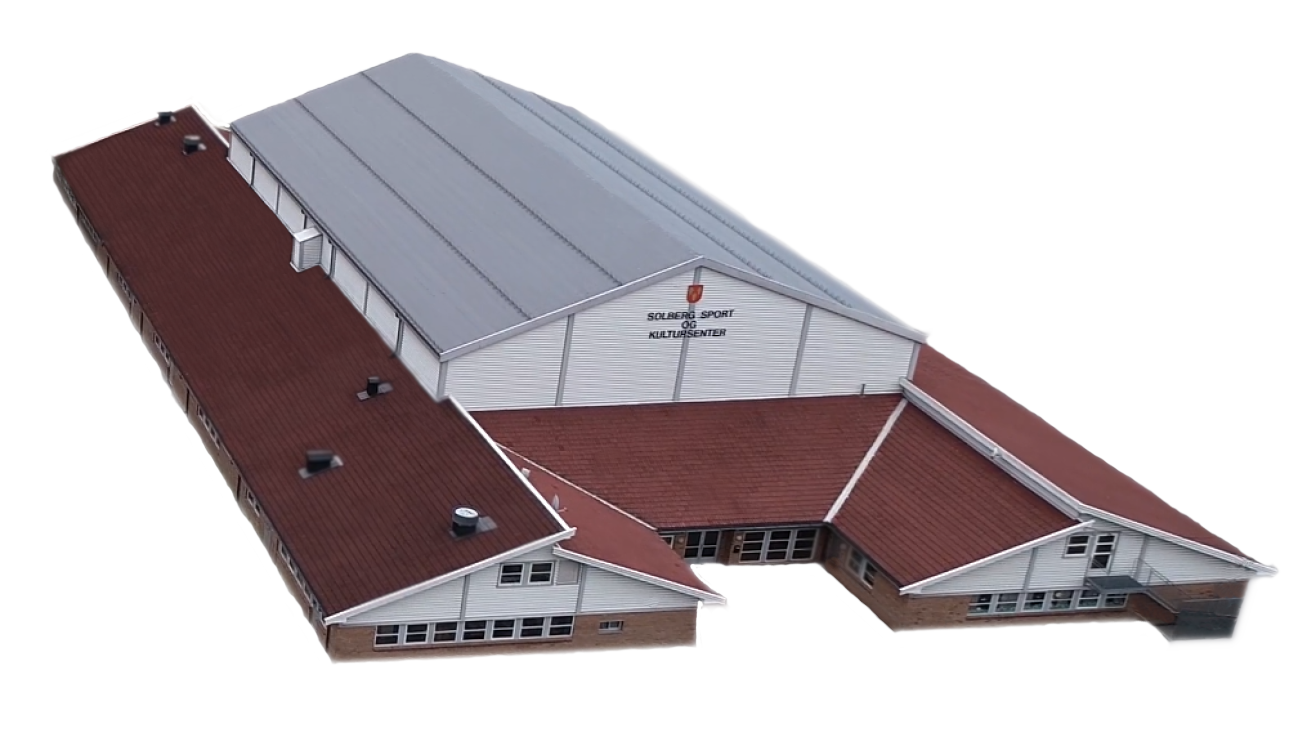
Solberg sports and cultural center

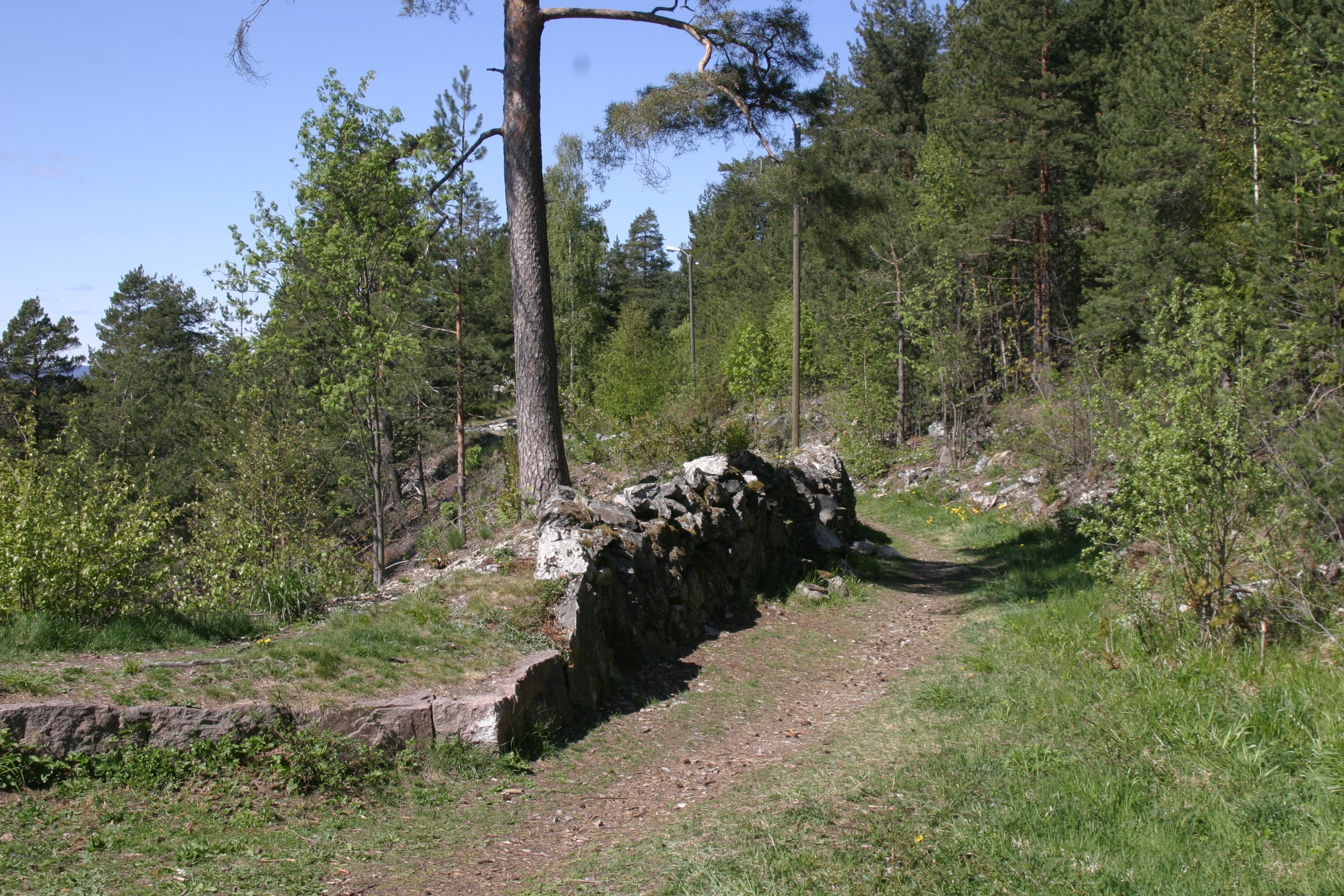
Geithol

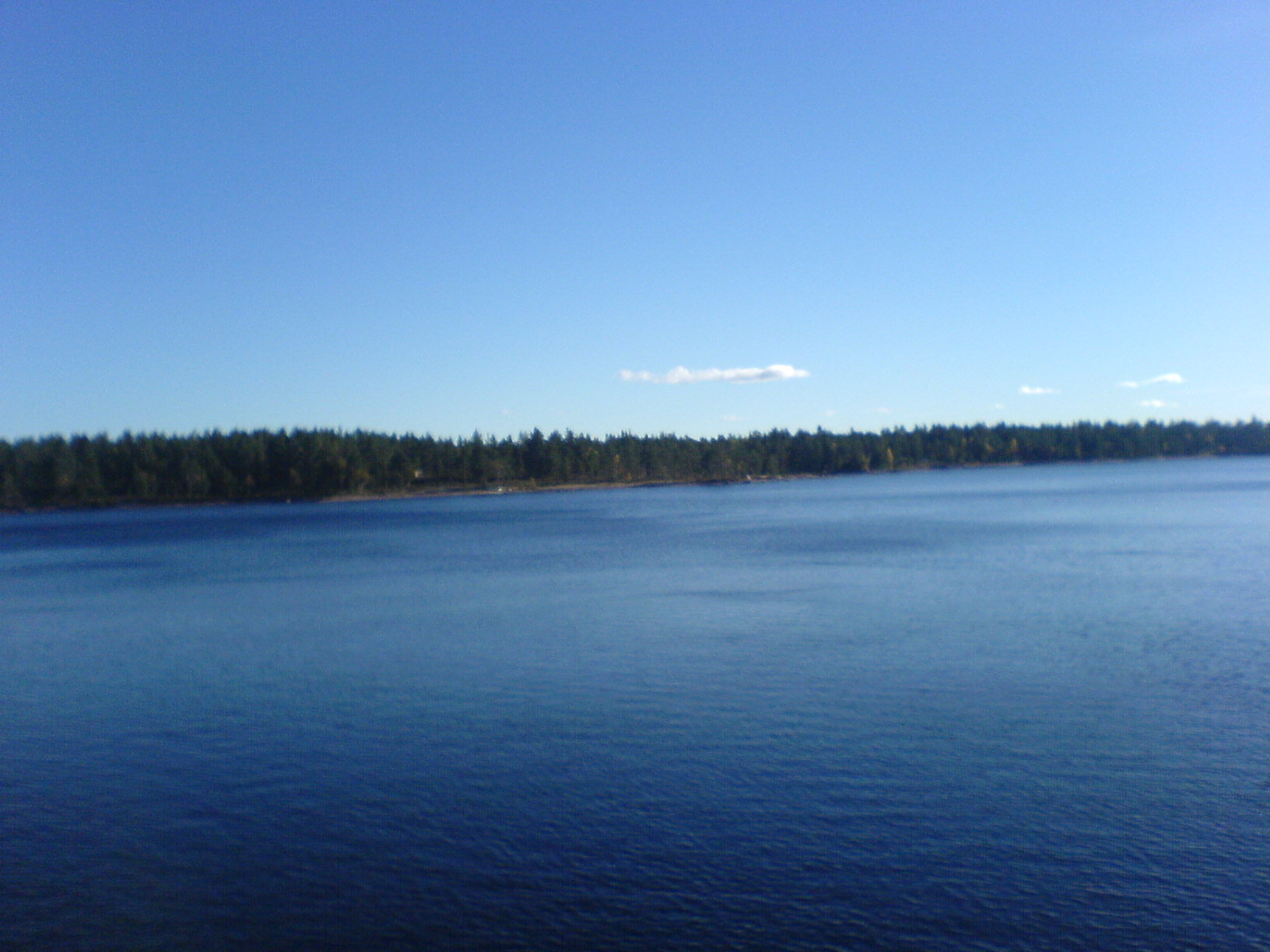
Nerdammen

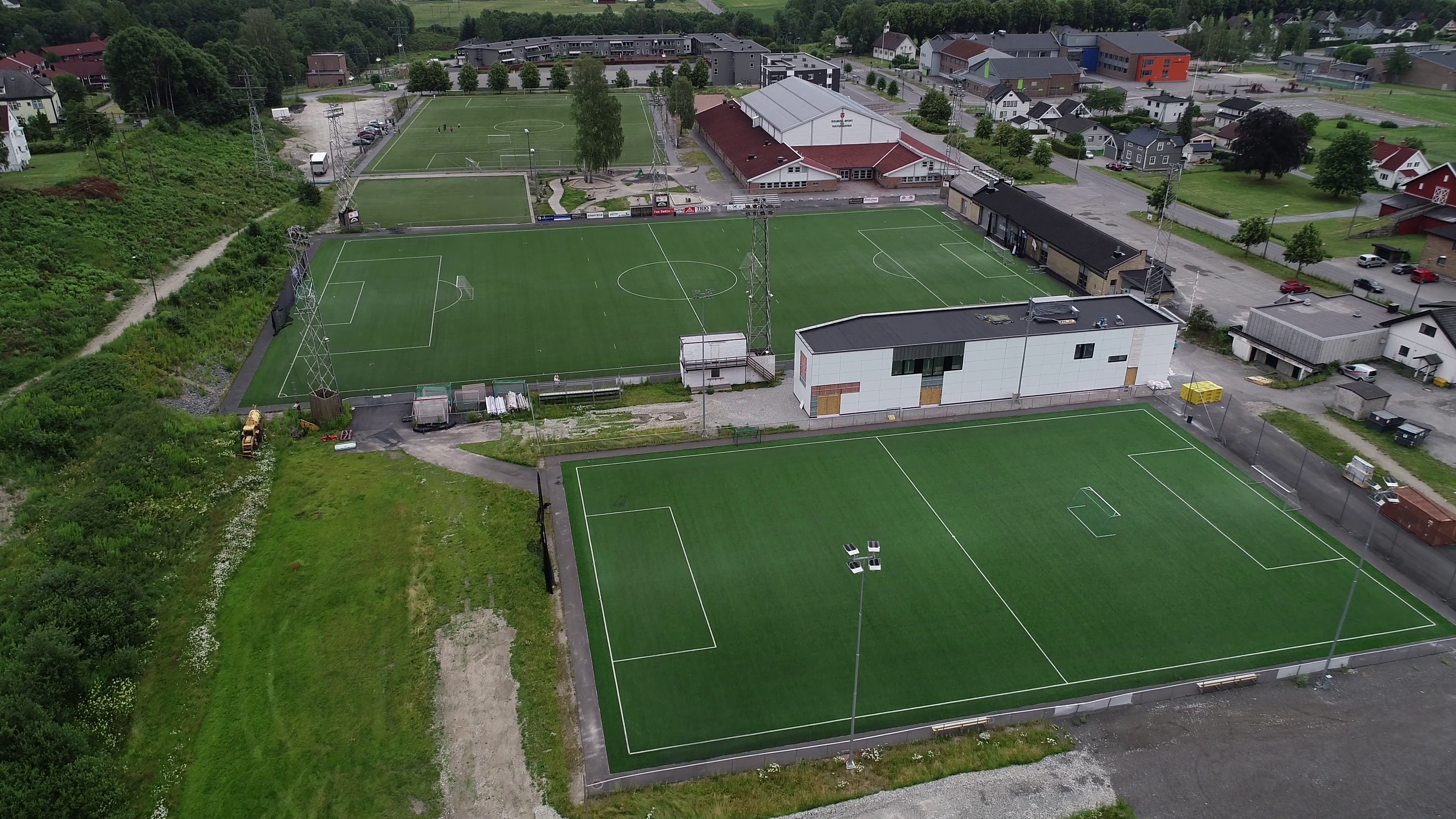
Solberg sports park

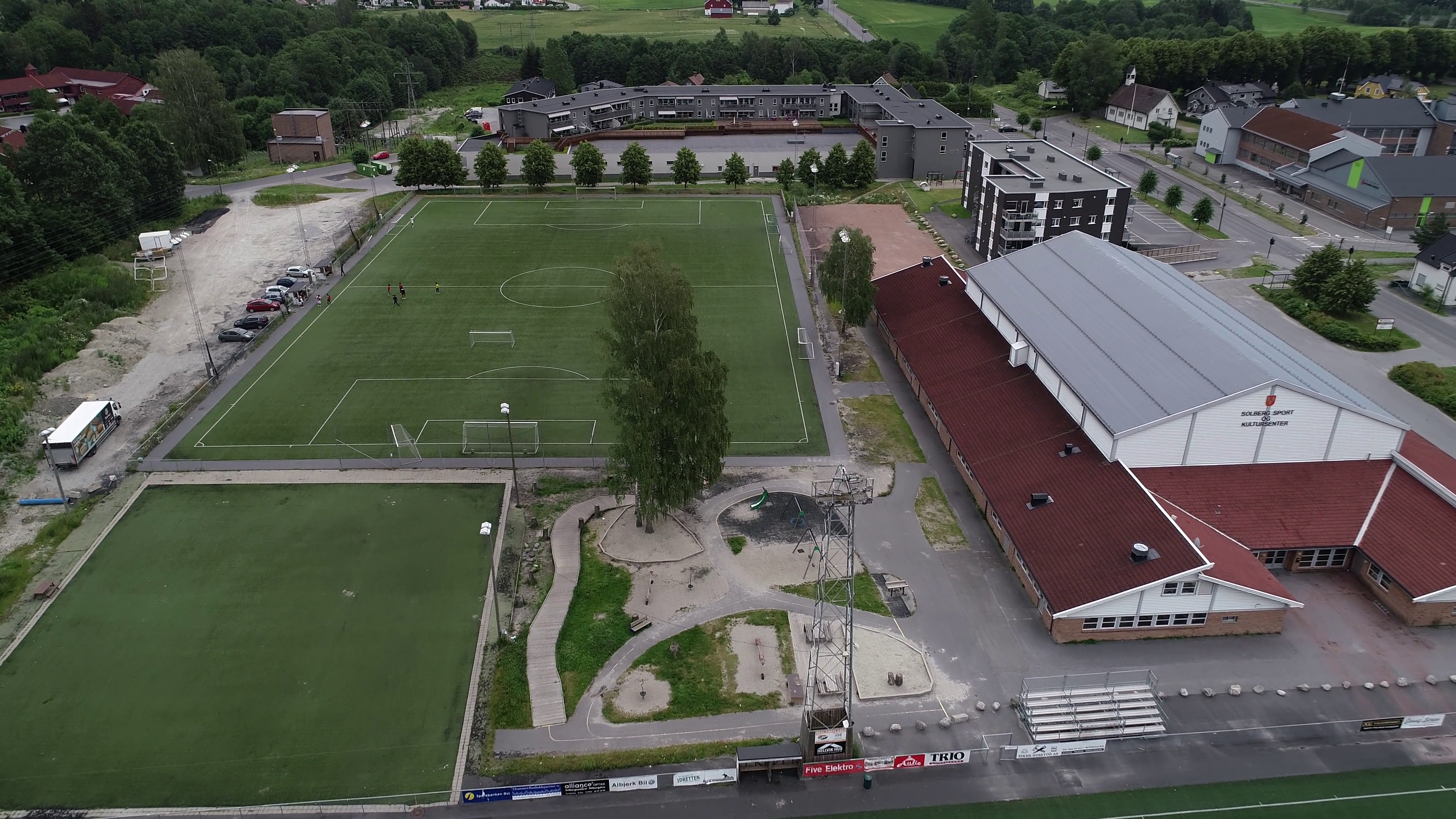
Solberg sports park and cultural center

== Notable people ==
- Renate Reinsve, actress
