= European Film Award for Best Visual Effects =

European Film Academy award

- Country: Europe
- Presented by: European Film Academy
- First award: 2018
- Currently held by: Bryan Jones, Pierre Procoudine-Gorsky, Chervin Shafaghi & Guillaume Le Gouez – The Substance (2024)
- Website: europeanfilmawards.eu

The European Film Award for Best Visual Effects has been awarded annually by the European Film Academy since 2018.

== Winners and nominees ==
=== 2010s ===
Year	Recipient(s)	English title	Original title	Ref.
2018 (31st)	Peter Hjorth	Border	Gräns	
2019 (32nd)	Martin Ziebell, Sebastian Kaltmeyer, Néha Hirve, Jesper Brodersen, and Torgeir Busch	About Endlessness	Om det oändliga	

=== 2020s ===
Year	Recipient(s)	English title	Original title	Ref.
2020 (33rd)	Iñaki Madariaga	The Platform	El hoyo	
2021 (34th)	Peter Hjorth and Fredrik Nord	Lamb	Dýrið	
2022 (35th)	Frank Petzold, Viktor Müller, and Markus Frank	All Quiet on the Western Front	Im Westen nichts Neues	
2023 (36th)	Félix Bergés and Laura Pedro	Society of the Snow	La sociedad de la nieve	
2024 (37th)	Bryan Jones, Pierre Procoudine-Gorsky, Chervin Shafaghi, and Guillaume Le Gouez	The Substance		

== See also ==
- Academy Award for Best Visual Effects
- BAFTA Award for Best Special Visual Effects
- César Award for Best Visual Effects
