= Nesten voksen =

- Genre: Sitcom
- Starring: Jenny Skavlan; Nils Jørgen Kaalstad; Kjersti Tveterås; Mattis Herman Nyquist; Renate Reinsve; Hans Olav Brenner
- Country of origin: Norway
- Original language: Norwegian
- No. of seasons: 1
- No. of episodes: 8

Production
- Running time: 23–26 minutes

Original release
- Network: NRK
- Release: 6 January – 24 February 2018

Nesten voksen (English: Almost Grown-Up) is a Norwegian sitcom series that aired in 2018 on NRK.

Its setting is the hipster neighbourhood Grünerløkka in Oslo, where three young women live on the brink of "real" adulthood. These three characters are played by Jenny Skavlan (boyfriend: Nils Jørgen Kaalstad), Kjersti Tveterås (boyfriend: Mattis Herman Nyquist) and Renate Reinsve. Tveterås' character also has a freeloading brother, played by Hans Olav Brenner. It was described as an urban version of Side om side.

At the premiere, the series was given a "die throw" of 3 in VG and in Bergens Tidende; 2 in Dagbladet, and 1 in Dagsavisen. The latter criticized it for "artificial" and "construed" humour, but also its complete lack of nonwhite characters in Norway's multi-cultural capital Oslo.

Three seasons of Nesten voksen were planned, but in April 2018 it was announced that they were scrapped.
