= 37th European Film Awards =

2024 award ceremony

- Date: 7 December 2024
- Site: KKL, Lucerne, Switzerland
- Hosted by: Fernando Tiberini
- Organized by: European Film Academy
- Official website: EFA

Highlights
- Best Picture: Emilia Pérez
- Most awards: Emilia Pérez (5)
- Most nominations: Emilia Pérez (5)

Television coverage
- Network: europeanfilmawards.eu

The 37th European Film Awards, presented by the European Film Academy to recognize achievements in European filmmaking, took place at Kultur- und Kongresszentrum Luzern in Lucerne on 7 December 2024. It marked the first time the awards ceremony was held in Switzerland. Swiss host and voiceover actor Fernando Tiberini hosted the ceremony.

The winners of the Excellence Awards were announced on 13 November 2024, honoring the arts and crafts of filmmaking in eight categories. On 7 December the other winners were revealed during the ceremony, with Jacques Audiard's Emilia Perez winning in each of the categories it was nominated.

== Selections ==
=== Feature films ===
The first part of the Academy’s Feature Film Selection was announced on 14 August 2024. The second part with 16 further titles was announced on 26 September 2024.

- April – Dea Kulumbegashvili (France, Georgia, Italy)
- Arcadia – Yorgos Zois (Bulgaria, Greece, United States)
- Armand – Halfdan Ullmann Tøndel (Germany, Netherlands, Norway, Sweden)
- Bird – Andrea Arnold (France, Germany, United Kingdom, United States)
- Conclave – Edward Berger (United Kingdom, United States)
- Crossing – Levan Akin (France, Georgia, Germany, Sweden, Turkey)
- Dying – Matthias Glasner (Germany)
- Emilia Pérez – Jacques Audiard (France)
- Grand Tour – Miguel Gomes (France, Italy, Portugal)
- Hard Truths – Mike Leigh (Spain, United Kingdom)
- Harvest – Athina Rachel Tsangari (Germany, United Kingdom, United States)
- Hesitation Wound – Selman Nacar (France, Romania, Spain, Turkey)
- Julie Keeps Quiet – Leonardo Van Dijl (Belgium, Sweden)
- Kinds of Kindness – Yorgos Lanthimos (Greece, Ireland, United Kingdom, United States)
- Kneecap – Rich Peppiatt (Ireland, United Kingdom)
- Life – Zeki Demirkubuz (Bulgaria, Turkey)
- Misericordia – Alain Guiraudie (France, Portugal, Spain)
- Misericordia – Emma Dante (Italy)
- Moon – Kurdwin Ayub (Austria)
- Mr. K – Tallulah Hazekamp Schwab (Belgium, Netherlands, Norway)
- My Fathers' Daughter – Egil Pedersen (Finland, Norway, Sweden)
- Queer – Luca Guadagnino (Italy, United States)
- Souleymane's Story – Boris Lojkine (France)
- The Count of Monte Cristo – Matthieu Delaporte, Alexandre De La Patellière (France)
- The Devil's Bath – Veronika Franz and Severin Fiala (Austria, Germany)
- The End – Joshua Oppenheimer (Denmark, Germany, Ireland, Italy, Sweden, United Kingdom)
- The Girl with the Needle – Magnus von Horn (Denmark, Poland, Sweden)
- The Invisible Fight – Rainer Sarnet (Estonia, Finland, Greece, Latvia)
- The New Year That Never Came – Bogdan Mureșanu (Romania)
- The Other Way Around – Jonás Trueba (France, Spain)
- The Room Next Door – Pedro Almodóvar (Spain)
- The Rye Horn – Jaione Camborda (Belgium, Portugal, Spain)
- The Seed of the Sacred Fig – Mohammad Rasoulof (France, Germany, Iran)
- The Shameless – Konstantin Bojanov (Bulgaria, France, India, Switzerland, Taiwan)
- The Sparrow in the Chimney – Ramon Zürcher (Switzerland)
- The Substance – Coralie Fargeat (France, United Kingdom, United States)
- The Village Next to Paradise – Mo Harawe (Austria, France, Somalia)
- There's Still Tomorrow – Paola Cortellesi (Italy)
- Three Kilometres to the End of the World – Emanuel Pârvu (Romania)
- Toxic – Saulė Bliuvaitė (Lithuania)
- Un amor – Isabel Coixet (Spain)
- Vermiglio – Maura Delpero (Belgium, France, Italy)
- When the Light Breaks – Rúnar Rúnarsson (Croatia, France, Iceland, Netherlands)
- Windless – Pavel G. Vesnakov (Bulgaria, Italy)
- Without Air – Katalin Moldovai (Hungary)

=== Documentary ===
The Documentary Film Selection was announced on 21 August 2024.

- At Averroès & Rosa Parks – Nicolas Philibert (France)
- Bye Bye Tiberias – Lina Soualem (France, Belgium, Palestine, Qatar)
- Dahomey – Mati Diop (France, Senegal)
- Direct Action – Guillaume Cailleau, Ben Russell (Germany, France)
- In Limbo – Alina Maksimenko (Poland)
- Marching in the Dark – Kinshuk Surjan (Belgium, Netherlands, India)
- My Stolen Planet – Farahnaz Sharifi (Germany)
- No Other Land – Yuval Abraham, Rachel Szor, Basel Adra, Hamdan Ballal (Palestine, Norway)
- Pelikan Blue – László Csáki (Hungary)
- Soundtrack to a Coup d'Etat – Johan Grimonprez (France, Belgium, Netherlands)
- The Landscape and the Fury – Nicole Vögele (Switzerland)
- The Words Women Spoke One Day – Raphaël Pillosio (France)

== Winners and nominees ==
The nominees for European Animated Feature Film were revealed on 9 October 2024. The nominees for European Short Film were revealed on 16 October 2024. The nominees for the main categories were announced on 5 November 2024.

=== European Film ===
English title	Original title	Director(s)	Producer(s)
Emilia Pérez		(France) Jacques Audiard	Pascal Caucheteux; Jacques Audiard; Valérie Schermann; Anthony Vaccarello
The Room Next Door		(Spain) Pedro Almodóvar	Agustín Almodóvar; Esther García
The Seed of the Sacred Fig	دانه‌ی انجیر معابد	(Iran) Mohammad Rasoulof	Mohammad Rasoulof; Amin Sadraei; Jean-Christophe Simon; Mani Tilgner; Rozita Hendijanian
The Substance		(France) Coralie Fargeat	Coralie Fargeat; Tim Bevan; Eric Fellner
Vermiglio		(Italy) Maura Delpero	Francesca Andreoli; Leonardo Guerra Seràgnoli; Santiago Fondevila Sancet; Maura Delpero

=== European Director ===
Director(s)	Work
(France) Jacques Audiard	Emilia Pérez
(United Kingdom) Andrea Arnold	Bird
(Spain) Pedro Almodóvar	The Room Next Door
(Iran) Mohammad Rasoulof	The Seed of the Sacred Fig
(Italy) Maura Delpero	Vermiglio

=== European Screenwriter ===
Screenwriter(s)	Work
(France) Jacques Audiard	Emilia Pérez
(Sweden) (Poland) Magnus von Horn (Denmark) Line Langebek	The Girl with the Needle
(Spain) Pedro Almodóvar	The Room Next Door
(Iran) Mohammad Rasoulof	The Seed of the Sacred Fig
(France) Coralie Fargeat	The Substance

=== European Actor ===
Actor	Work
(France) Abou Sangare	Souleymane's Story
(Germany) Franz Rogowski	Bird
(United Kingdom) Ralph Fiennes	Conclave
(Germany) Lars Eidinger	Dying
(United Kingdom) Daniel Craig	Queer

=== European Actress ===
Actress	Work
(Spain) Karla Sofía Gascón	Emilia Pérez
(Norway) Renate Reinsve	Armand
(Denmark) Trine Dyrholm	The Girl with the Needle
(Denmark) Vic Carmen Sonne	The Girl with the Needle
(United Kingdom) Tilda Swinton	The Room Next Door

=== European Documentary ===
English title	Original title	Director(s)	Country
No Other Land		(Israel) Yuval Abraham (Israel) Rachel Szor (Palestine) Basel Adra (Palestine) Hamdan Ballal	Palestine, Norway
Bye Bye Tiberias	باي باي طبريا	(France) Lina Soualem	France, Belgium, Palestine, Qatar
Dahomey		(France) Mati Diop	France, Senegal
In Limbo	W zawieszeniu	(Ukraine) Alina Maksimenko	Poland
Soundtrack to a Coup d'Etat		(Belgium) Johan Grimonprez	France, Belgium, Netherlands

=== European Animated Feature Film ===
English title	Original title	Director(s)	Country
Flow	Straume	(Latvia) Gints Zilbalodis	Latvia, France, Belgium
Living Large	Život k sežrání	(Czech Republic) Kristina Dufková	Czech Republic, France, Slovakia
Savages	Sauvages	(Switzerland) Claude Barras	Switzerland, France, Belgium
Sultana's Dream	El sueño de la sultana	(Spain) Isabel Herguera	Spain, Germany, India
They Shot the Piano Player	Dispararon al pianista	(Spain) Fernando Trueba (Spain) Javier Mariscal	Spain, France, Netherlands, Portugal, Peru

=== European Discovery – Prix FIPRESCI ===
English title	Original title	Director(s)	Country
Armand		(Norway) Halfdan Ullmann Tøndel	Norway, Netherlands, Germany, Sweden
Hoard		(United Kingdom) Luna Carmoon	UK
Kneecap		(United Kingdom) Rich Peppiatt	Ireland, UK
Santosh		(United Kingdom) (India) Sandhya Suri	UK, France, Germany
The New Year That Never Came	Anul Nou care n-a fost	(Romania) Bogdan Mureșanu	Romania, Serbia
Toxic	Akiplėša	(Lithuania) Saulė Bliuvaitė	Lithuania

=== European Young Audience Award ===
English title	Original title	Director(s)	Country
The Remarkable Life of Ibelin	Ibelin	Benjamin Ree	Norway
Lars is LOL	Lars er LOL	Eirik Sæter Stordahl	Norway, Denmark
Winners	Sieger sein	Soleen Yusef	Germany

=== European Short Film ===
Title	Director(s)	Country
The Man Who Could Not Remain Silent	Nebojša Slijepčević	Croatia, France, Bulgaria, Slovenia
2720	Basil da Cunha	Portugal, Switzerland
Clamor	Salomé Da Souza	France
The Exploding Girl	Caroline Poggi and Jonathan Vinel	France
Wander to Wonder	Nina Gantz	The Netherlands, France, Belgium, United Kingdom

=== Excellence Awards ===
European Cinematography (Scotland) Benjamin Kračun – The Substance	European Editing (France) Juliette Welfling – Emilia Pérez	European Production Design (Poland) Jagna Dobesz – The Girl with the Needle	European Costume Design (Austria) Tanja Hausner – The Devil's Bath
European Make-up & Hair (Netherlands) Evalotte Oosterop – When the Light Breaks	European Original Score (Denmark) Frederikke Hoffmeier – The Girl with the Needle	European Sound (France) Marc-Olivier Brullé (France) Pierre Bariaud (France) Charlotte Butrak (France) Samuel Aïchoun (France) Rodrigo Diaz – Souleymane's Story	European Visual Effects (United Kingdom) Bryan Jones (France) Pierre Procoudine-Gorsky (France) Chervin Shafaghi (France) Guillaume Le Gouez – The Substance

== Honorary Awards ==
EFA Lifetime Achievement Award	European Achievement in World Cinema	Eurimages International Co-Production Award
(Germany) Wim Wenders	(Italy) Isabella Rossellini	(North Macedonia) Labina Mitevska

== Special awards ==
=== Lux European Audience Film Award 2025 ===
The LUX Audience Award, presented by the European Parliament and the European Film Academy, recognize films that help to raise awareness of socio-political issues in Europe.

English title	Original title	Director(s)	Country
Animal		(Greece) Sofia Exarchou	Greece, Austria, Romania, Cyprus, Bulgaria
Dahomey		(France) Mati Diop	France, Senegal, Benin
Flow	Straume	(Latvia) Gints Zilbalodis	Latvia, France, Belgium
Intercepted		(Canada) Oksana Karpovych	Canada, France, Ukraine
Julie Keeps Quiet	Julie zwijgt	(Belgium) Leonardo van Dijl	Belgium, Sweden

=== European University Film Award (EUFA) ===
The nominees for the European University Film Award were announced on 23 October 2024 by the European Film Academy and Filmfest Hamburg. The winner was announced at the Mayor’s Night in Lucerne on 6 December 2024, the evening before the European Film Awards Ceremony.

English title	Original title	Director	Country
Three Kilometres to the End of the World	Trei kilometri până la capătul lumii	(Romania) Emanuel Pârvu	Romania
April		(Georgia (country)) Dea Kulumbegashvili	Georgia, France, Italy
Armand		(Norway) Halfdan Ullmann Tøndel	Norway, Netherlands, Germany, Sweden
Kneecap		(United Kingdom) Rich Peppiatt	Ireland, UK
Moon	Mond	(Austria) (Iraq) Kurdwin Ayub	Austria
