= Armand (film) =

2024 film by Halfdan Ullmann Tøndel

- Theatrical release poster
- Directed by: Halfdan Ullmann Tøndel
- Written by: Halfdan Ullmann Tøndel
- Produced by: Andrea Berentsen Ottmar
- Starring: Renate Reinsve; Ellen Dorrit Petersen; Endre Hellestveit; Thea Lambrechts Vaulen; Øystein Røger; Vera Veljovic
- Cinematography: Pål Ulvik Rokseth
- Edited by: Robert Krantz
- Music by: Ella van der Woude
- Production companies: Eye Eye Pictures; Keplerfilm; One Two Films; Prolaps Produktion; Film i Väst
- Distributed by: Norsk Filmdistribusjon (Norway); Folkets Bio (Sweden); Pandora Film (Germany)
- Release dates: 18 May 2024 (Cannes); 27 September 2024 (Norway); 25 October 2024 (Sweden); 21 November 2024 (Germany)
- Running time: 117 minutes
- Countries: Norway; Netherlands; Germany; Sweden
- Language: Norwegian
- Box office: $971,932

Armand is a 2024 thriller drama film written and directed by Norwegian filmmaker Halfdan Ullmann Tøndel, in his feature directorial debut. An international co-production of Norway, the Netherlands, Germany and Sweden, the film stars Renate Reinsve, Ellen Dorrit Petersen, Endre Hellestveit, Thea Lambrechts Vaulen, Øystein Røger, and Vera Veljovic.

The film had its world premiere in the Un Certain Regard section at the 77th Cannes Film Festival on 18 May 2024, and won the Caméra d'Or, for Best First Feature Film. It was theatrically released in Norway on 27 September 2024. It was chosen as the Norwegian entry for Best International Feature Film at the 97th Academy Awards, and made the December shortlist.

== Plot ==
After an alleged sexual aggression between two 6-year-old boys, the parents and school staff are called in to clarify the incident. They convene Anders and Sarah, the parents of Jon, and Elisabeth, the single mother of Armand, who allegedly assaulted Jon.

The entirety of the movie takes place during the meeting between the school staff and the parents.

== Cast ==
- Renate Reinsve as Elizabeth
- Ellen Dorrit Petersen as Sarah
- Endre Hellestveit as Anders
- Thea Lambrechts Vaulen as Sunna
- Øystein Røger as Jarle
- Vera Veljovic as Ajsa

== Production ==
Armand is the feature directorial debut of Halfdan Ullmann Tøndel, grandson of Norwegian actress Liv Ullmann and Swedish filmmaker Ingmar Bergman. It is a production of Eye Eye Pictures, which was launched in 2022 by the former Oslo Pictures CEO-producer Dyveke Bjørkly Graver and producer Andrea Berentsen Ottmar, both of whom worked on Joachim Trier's acclaimed 2021 film The Worst Person in the World. Armand is produced by Berentsen Ottmar, in co-production with Keplerfilm (Netherlands), One Two Films (Germany), Prolaps Produktion (Sweden) and Film i Väst (Sweden). Trier and Bjørkly Graver served as the executive producers.

== Release ==
Armand was selected to compete in the Un Certain Regard section at the 77th Cannes Film Festival, where it had its world premiere on 18 May 2024. The film made its North American premiere at the 32nd Hamptons International Film Festival, where it won the top honor for Best Narrative Feature. It was also selected for the MAMI Mumbai Film Festival 2024 under the World Cinema section. It will also be featured at the 25th European Film Festival held in conjunction with 8th Malaysia International Film Festival in July 2025.

International sales are handled by Charades. Norsk Filmdistribusjon theatrically released the film in Norway on 27 September 2024. North American distribution rights were acquired by IFC Films in June 2024. Folkets Bio is scheduled to theatrically release the film in Sweden on 25 October 2024, while Pandora Film is scheduled to release it in Germany on 21 November 2024.

== Reception ==
=== Critical response ===
On the review aggregator website Rotten Tomatoes, 74% of 73 critics' reviews are positive. The website's consensus reads: "Whenever Armand's ambitious structure threatens to collapse into its own rabbit hole, Renate Reinsve's outstanding performance holds everything together even as her character's composure falls apart." Metacritic, which uses a weighted average, assigned the film a score of 61 out of 100, based on 22 critics, indicating "generally favorable" reviews.

=== Accolades ===
Award	Date of ceremony	Category	Recipient(s)	Result	Ref.
Cannes Film Festival	25 May 2024 (Note: The award ceremony of Un Certain Regard was held on 24 May 2024.)	Prix Un Certain Regard	Halfdan Ullmann Tøndel	Nominated	
Cannes Film Festival	25 May 2024	Caméra d'Or	Halfdan Ullmann Tøndel	Won	
Directors Guild of America Awards	8 February 2025	Michael Apted Award for Outstanding Directorial Achievement in First-Time Theatrical Feature Film	Halfdan Ullmann Tøndel	Nominated	
European Film Awards	7 December 2024	European University Film Award	Halfdan Ullmann Tøndel	Nominated	
European Film Awards	7 December 2024	European Discovery – Prix FIPRESCI	Halfdan Ullmann Tøndel	Won	
European Film Awards	7 December 2024	European Actress	Renate Reinsve	Nominated	
Hamptons International Film Festival	15 October 2024	Best Narrative Feature	Halfdan Ullmann Tøndel	Won	

== See also ==
- List of submissions to the 97th Academy Awards for Best International Feature Film
- List of Norwegian submissions for the Academy Award for Best International Feature Film
