= Halfdan Ullmann Tøndel =

Norwegian film director

- Born: 9 June 1990 (age 36)
- Occupations: Film director, screenwriter
- Parent: Linn Ullmann (mother)
- Family: Liv Ullmann (grandmother); Ingmar Bergman (grandfather)

Halfdan Ullmann Tøndel (Norwegian pronunciation: ['halfdan 'ʉlmɑn 'tœnnəl]; born 9 June 1990) is a Norwegian filmmaker. His film Armand won the Caméra d'Or for best first feature at the 2024 Cannes Film Festival.

== Early life and education ==
Tøndel was born in 1990 in Oslo. His mother is Linn Ullmann and his grandparents are Liv Ullmann and Ingmar Bergman. His father is Norwegian businessman Espen Tøndel. He studied filmmaking at Westerdals Oslo School of Arts, Communication and Technology.

== Career ==
After directing the short films Bird Hearts and Fanny, Tøndel made his feature-length directorial debut, Armand, which premiered in the Un Certain Regard section of the 2024 Cannes Film Festival.

== Filmography ==
Year	Title	Notes	Ref.
2015	Bird Hearts	Short film	
2017	Fanny	Short film	
2024	Armand	—N/a	

== Awards and nominations ==
Award	Year	Category	Work	Result	Ref.
Nordisk Panorama Film Festival	2015	Best New Nordic Voice	Bird Hearts	Won	
Amanda Awards	2017	Best Short Film	Fanny	Nominated	
Seattle International Film Festival	2017	Special Jury Mention (Live Action)	Fanny	Won	
Cannes Film Festival	2024	Prix Un Certain Regard	Armand	Nominated	
Cannes Film Festival	2024	Camera d'Or	Armand	Won	
European Film Awards	2024	European Discovery – Prix FIPRESCI	Armand	Won	
European Film Awards	2024	European University Film Award	Armand	Nominated	
Hamptons International Film Festival	2024	Best Narrative Feature	Armand	Won	
Directors Guild of America Awards	2025	Michael Apted Award for Outstanding Directorial Achievement in First-Time Theatrical Feature Film	Armand	Nominated	
