= Hvite gutter =

Norwegian television sitcom

- Genre: Sitcom
- Starring: Jørgen Evensen; Johannes Roaldsen Fürst; Eirik Hvattum Bjørnstad; Torjus Tveiten
- Country of origin: Norway
- Original language: Norwegian
- No. of seasons: 7
- No. of episodes: 58

Production
- Running time: 20–24 minutes

Original release
- Network: TVNorge
- Release: January 6, 2018 – October 13, 2022

Hvite gutter (English: White Boys) is a Norwegian sitcom series that premiered in 2018 on TVNorge and Dplay.

It was created and written by Jørgen Evensen, Johannes Roaldsen Fürst, Eirik Hvattum Bjørnstad and Torjus Tveiten, who also play the four main characters. Approaching the end of their 20s, they still live a carefree life in Frogner, Oslo.

At the premiere, the series was given a "die throw" of 4 in Dagbladet, 3 in VG and in Stavanger Aftenblad; and 2 in Dagsavisen.

The series has been nominated several times to the Gullruten award.
