= Nedre Eiker Church =

Church in Buskerud, Norway

- Nedre Eiker kirke
- View of the church
- Nedre Eiker Church
- 59°45′24″N 10°02′18″E
- Location: Drammen Municipality, Buskerud
- Country: Norway
- Denomination: Church of Norway
- Churchmanship: Evangelical Lutheran

History
- Status: Parish church
- Founded: 1860
- Consecrated: 21 Nov 1860

Architecture
- Functional status: Active
- Architect: Wilhelm Hanstein
- Architectural type: Long church
- Completed: 1860 (166 years ago)

Specifications
- Capacity: 400
- Materials: Wood

Administration
- Diocese: Tunsberg bispedømme
- Deanery: Drammen og Lier prosti
- Parish: Nedre Eiker
- Norwegian Cultural Heritage Site
- Type: Church
- Status: Listed
- ID: 85097

Nedre Eiker Church (Norwegian: Nedre Eiker kirke) is a parish church of the Church of Norway in Drammen Municipality in Buskerud county, Norway. It is located in the village of Krokstadelva. It is the church for the Nedre Eiker parish which is part of the Drammen og Lier prosti (deanery) in the Diocese of Tunsberg. The white, wooden church was built in a long church design in 1860 using plans drawn up by the architect Wilhelm Hanstein. The church seats about 400 people.

== History ==
Industrial development led to an increase in population along the Drammenselva River west of the city of Drammen in the 19th century. During the 1850s, the question of a church in the eastern part of Eiker Municipality arose. In 1854, Adolf Schirmer and Wilhelm von Hanno were invited to design a stone cruciform church which was to be located on the land from the Ekenes farm. However, the proposal was shelved, as it was considered too wasteful. Subsequently, Wilhelm Hanstein was hired to design a wooden long church on the Steinset farm. The foundation stone was laid in October 1858 and the church was consecrated on 21 November 1860.

== Media gallery ==

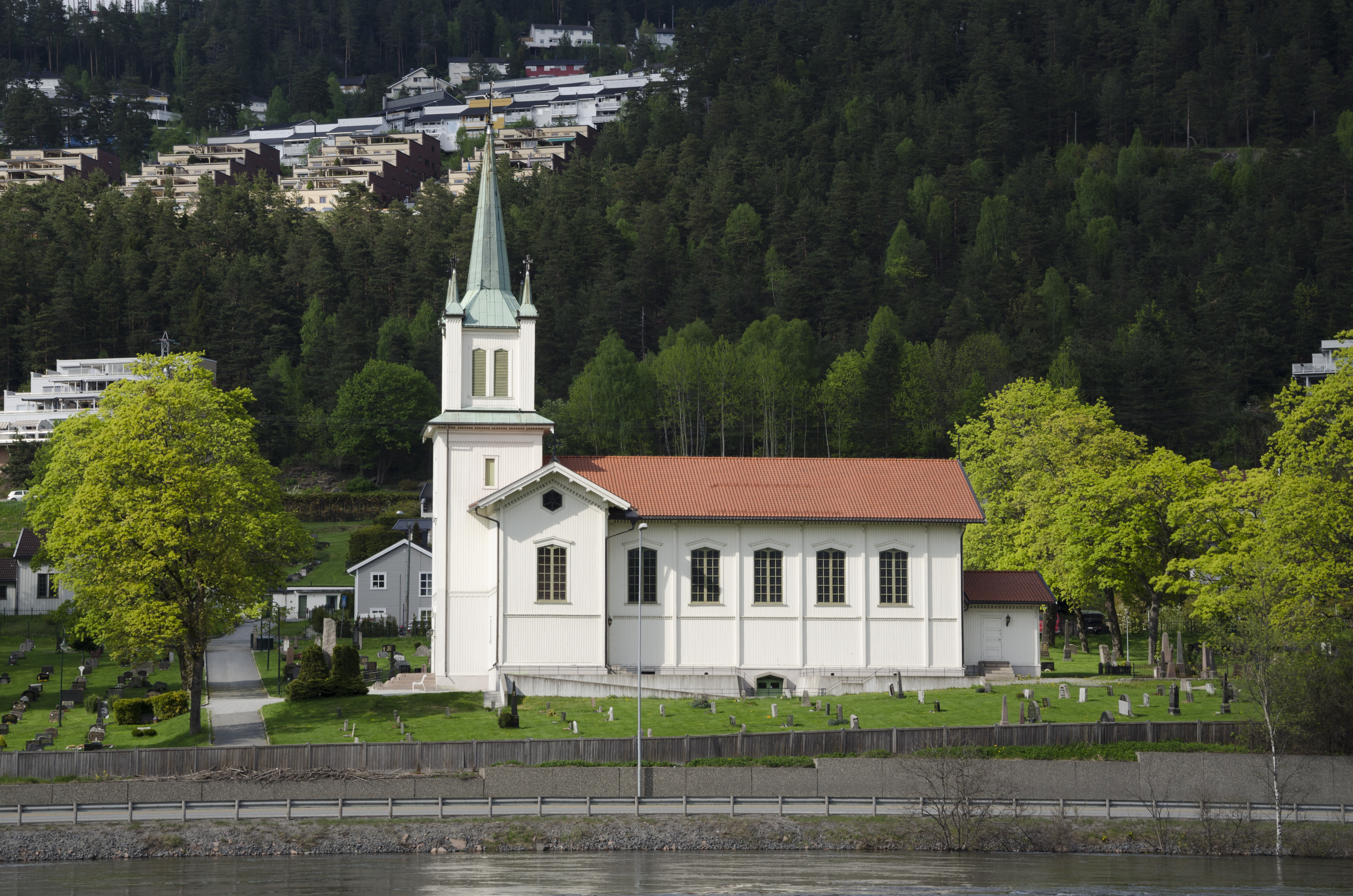

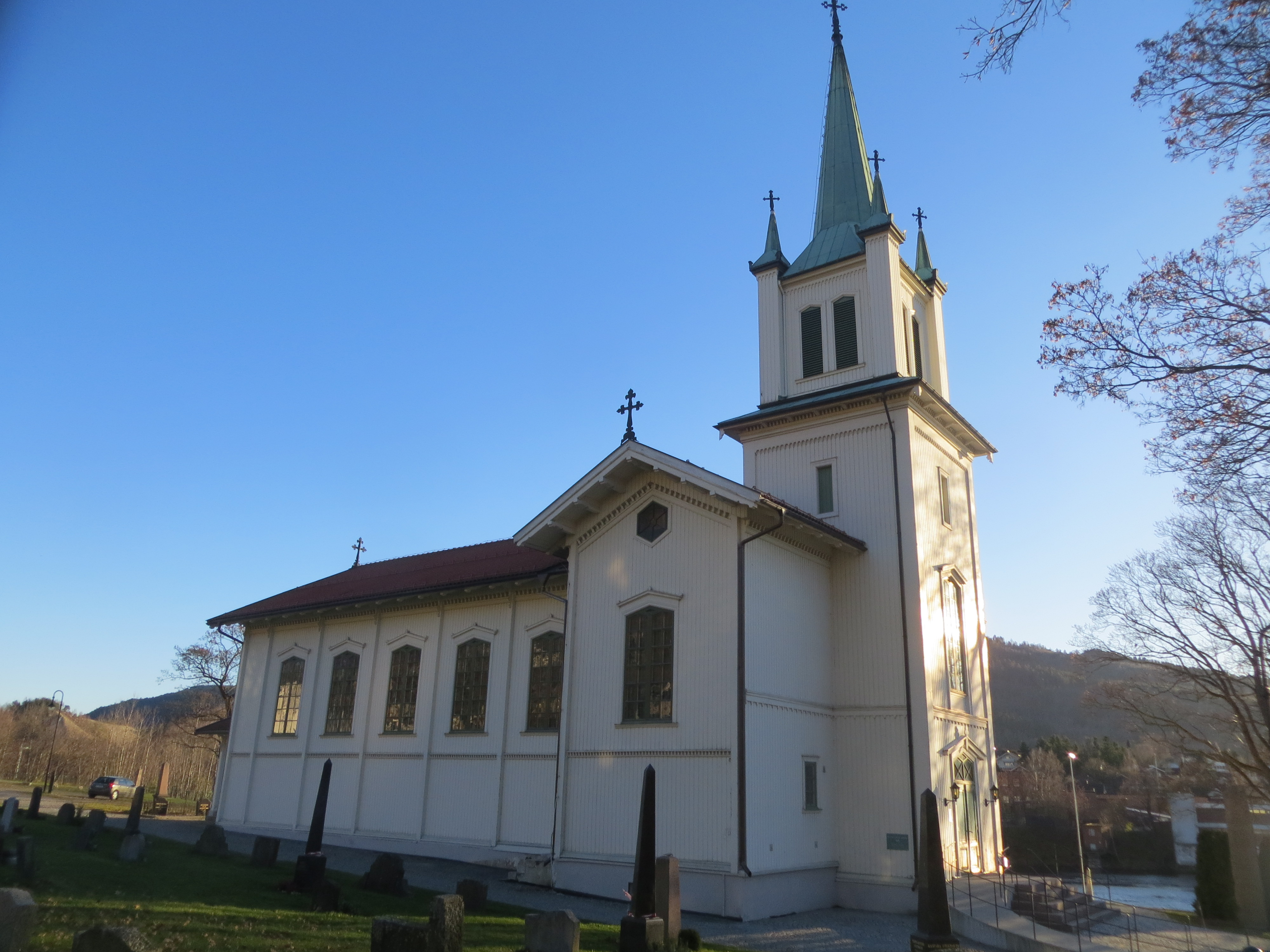

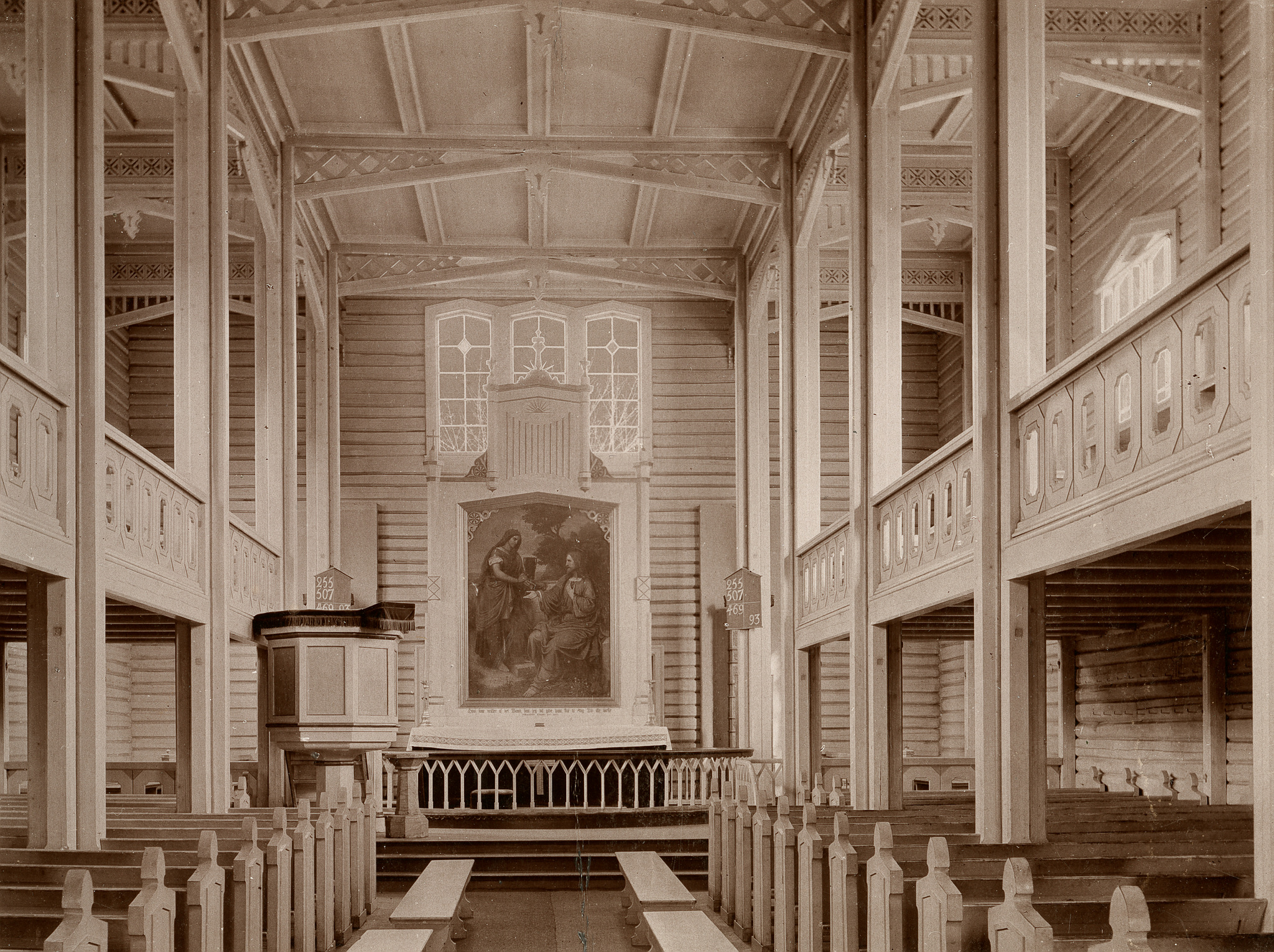

== See also ==
- List of churches in Tunsberg
