= The Cursed Sanctuary X =

- DVD cover
- Directed by: Yu Irie
- Written by: Yu Irie
- Based on: Holy Ground X by Tomohiro Maekawa
- Produced by: Masaki Koide; Takara Kosugi
- Starring: Masaki Okada; Haruna Kawaguchi; Kiyohiko Shibukawa; Maho Yamada; Sho Yakumaru; Yōko Maki; Naoto Ogata
- Cinematography: Ryô Ohtsuka
- Distributed by: Gaga Corporation
- Release date: 19 November 2021 (Japan)
- Running time: 114 minutes
- Country: Japan
- Language: Japanese

The Cursed Sanctuary X (Japanese: 聖地Ｘ) is a 2021 Japanese horror film directed by Yu Irie, starring Masaki Okada, Haruna Kawaguchi, Kiyohiko Shibukawa, Maho Yamada, Sho Yakumaru, Yōko Maki and Naoto Ogata. It follows a pair of siblings who unknowngly stumble into cursed land while in South Korea. The film is an adaptation of the Tomohiro Maekawa play Holy Ground X.

== Cast ==
- Masaki Okada as Teruo Yamada
- Haruna Kawaguchi as Kaname Azuda
- Kiyohiko Shibukawa as Kiyoshi
- Maho Yamada as Kyoko
- Sho Yakumaru as Shigeru
- Yōko Maki as Hoshino
- Naoto Ogata as Egushi
- Park E-hyun as Soo Young
- Park So-yoon as Kim
- Jin Tae-hyun as the wizard

== Production ==
The film is an adaptation of the Tomohiro Maekawa play Holy Ground X, making this the second Yu Irie film to have been adapted from a Maekawa play, after The Sun. Producer Masaki Koide, who had previously worked with Irie on the Japanese adaptation of the South Korean film Confession of Murder, approached him seeking to shoot a film with him in South Korea. Koide suggested adapting Holy Ground X, despite the play being set in Japan. This was also Irie's first attempt at a horror, a genre which he had previously avoided, despite being a Japanese horror fan, out of "respect" for filmmakers who had already been active in the local scene and because he felt that he lacked the "know-how". Additionally, this was also his first film to lack any "moral" or "message."

In writing the screenplay, Irie decided to give the film a more "otherworldly" feel with much left up to audience interpretation. He also made the decision to focus more on aiming to induce "anxiety" in the viewer instead of fright. Irie chose to include various aspects of Korean culture, with a notable example being the introduction of a scene not present in the source material depicting a shamanistic exorcism ritual, for which he interviewed mudangs. The film was shot on location in Incheon prior to the COVID-19 outbreak, with the film crew comprising both Japanese and Korean members. This allowed for a more "flexible" filming schedule than in Japan. According to Irie, filming in South Korea allowed the film's atmosphere to be less grounded and more foreign. He had chosen Incheon as it had both vacation homes and an old town. He named the chelfitsch theatre company as an inspiration for his direction in this film, with, several actors, including Yakumaru, being required to take contemporary dance lessons as preparation.

== Release ==
The film was billed as an "extreme horror", though Irie felt that the label was misleading. Okada and Kawaguchi claimed to have been "surprised" by the trailer's framing of the film, with the former instead calling the film a mix of genres. A promotional campaign involving professional wrestlers the Saito Brothers was launched in July 2021. The brothers were to visit sacred spaces around the world, with footage of their travels being uploaded to a newly created YouTube channel. Additionally, an image filter which would reportedly transform any location into a "Sacred Place X" was launched. The film opened in theatres in Japan and was released to video on demand service Telasa on 19 November.

The film opened in Taiwanese theatres on 15 April 2022. In the same month, it screened at the "Japanese Fantasy" section of the 12th Golden Horse Fantastic Film Festival, held in Taipei.

== Reception ==
Fumitake Otsuka of Eiga.com opined that Maekawa's style blends well with Irie's vision and that with this film, Irie is attempting to "upend" audiences' perception of him as a filmmaker. Hiroyuki Kawai of Raditopi proclaimed it one of the best films of 2021.

Reiko Kitagawa and Ryo Chiura of Kinema Junpo both gave the film a 3/5 rating, with Chiura praising Okada's "amazing" performance. Koremasa Uno, also of Kinema Junpo, was more critical, giving it a 2/5 rating and opining that the film starts out "exciting" but "quickly loses steam." He also criticised Kawaguchi's performance, which he felt "kills the tension".
