= The Sun (2016 film) =

- Film poster
- Directed by: Yu Irie
- Written by: Yu Irie; Tomohiro Maekawa
- Based on: The Sun by Tomohiro Maekawa
- Produced by: Tatsuro Hatanaka; Shinichiro Inoue
- Starring: Ryunosuke Kamiki; Mugi Kadowaki; Yuki Furukawa; Toshiki Ayata; Koki Mizuta; Kazuya Takahashi; Yoko Moriguchi; Jun Murakami; Yūko Nakamura; Shingo Tsurumi; Kanji Furutachi
- Cinematography: Ryuto Kondo
- Music by: Yūsuke Hayashi
- Production companies: Amuse Inc. Kadokawa Corporation
- Distributed by: Kadokawa Corporation
- Release date: 23 April 2016 (Japan)
- Running time: 129 minutes
- Country: Japan
- Language: Japanese

The Sun (Japanese: 太陽) is a 2016 Japanese science fiction drama film directed by Yu Irie, starring Ryunosuke Kamiki and Mugi Kadowaki. An adaptation of the Tomohiro Maekawa play The Sun, it is set in a near future where a deadly virus pandemic leads to the birth of the Nox, a new species of human immune to the virus who subjugate the Kyurios, humans who did not evolve into Nox. It follows an impoverished young Kyurio who wishes he were a Nox instead.

== Cast ==
- Ryunosuke Kamiki as Tetsuhiko Okudera
- Mugi Kadowaki as Ikuta Yui
- Yuki Furukawa as Fujita Morishige
- Toshiki Ayata as Yukio Sasaki
- Koki Mizuta as Takumi Sasaki
- Kazuya Takahashi as Yoji Kaneda
- Yoko Moriguchi as Reiko Soga
- Jun Murakami as Katsuya Okudera
- Yūko Nakamura as Junko Okudera
- Shingo Tsurumi as Seiji Soga
- Kanji Furutachi as Soichi Ikuta

== Production ==
Following the 2012 release of Roadside Fugitive, the last film in Yu Irie's 8000 Miles trilogy, a film producer who had worked with Irie on the trilogy asked him if he would be willing to direct a live-action film adaptation of Tomohiro Maekawa's science fiction play The Sun. After watching the play, Irie agreed, feeling that Maekawa's take on science fiction was unique for a Japanese play. This was his second science fiction film, after Japonica Virus, his directorial debut. Irie initially struggled to raise the funds required for the project as the science-fiction genre was not well established in Japanese cinema. It was made on a budget that was "medium-sized" for Japanese films.

Irie spent two years co-writing the screenplay with Maekawa, during which he worked on two other films, the live-action film adaptations of Hibi Rock and Joker Game. He claimed that, through his work on those films, he learnt the "limits" of what he could achieve in filmmaking. As such, when he began working on The Sun, he focused on "limiting the locations and sets as much as possible." While working on the script, he had extensive discussions with Maekawa regarding the Nox and the Kyurios. He chose to cut out much of the humour present in the play as he felt that it would undermine the depiction of hardships in the film. Additionally, due to time constraints, he cut out much of the play's scenes involving the Nox.

Ryunosuke Kamiki was cast as the protagonist, as Irie "couldn't" envision anyone else in the role and Mugi Kadowaki was similarly "easily cast" as the female lead. However, he experienced much difficulty in finding an actor suitable for the role of Morishige. He eventually decided on casting Yuki Furukawa, whom he'd first met in a workshop several years ago, in the role, due to his "elegance" and his height. Irie approached Ryuto Kondo to serve as the film's cinematographer as he felt that Kondo was "good at capturing nature."

The film was shot on location in the winter of 2014 in the Okuchichibu Mountains in Saitama Prefecture and Yamanashi Prefecture. When selecting the shooting locations, Irie made sure to choose areas which he felt adhered to Maekawa's vision. As much of the film was shot on mountains at night, the crew endured "harsh" filming conditions. While filming, Kamiki actively made suggestions regarding several aspects of his character, including his hairstyle towards the end of the film.

== Release ==
On 27 February 2016, a novelisation of the original play was released to promote the film. The film premiered at the Hitotsubashi Hall on 7 March before opening in theatres across Japan on 23 April. A revised version of the play was staged at the Theater Tram in Tokyo from 6 to 29 May and at the ABC Hall in Osaka from 3 to 5 June to coincide with the release of the film. The film screened at the 2016 Chichibu Film Festival, held in Chichibu, Saitama in September. It was one of five Yu Irie films to screen at the 37th Tokyo International Film Festival, held in late 2024, under the "Nippon Cinema Now" section.

== Reception ==
Daiji Noboru of Real Sound proclaimed the film a "masterpiece", calling it "extraordinary" as it is "not a simple story of haves and have-nots" and it tackles many modern societal issues, despite being set in the near future, which lends it a "poignant sense of reality." While Noboru felt that Kamiki and Kadowaki's performances were "passionate", he was "particularly impressed" by the performances of Furutachi and Tsurumi. He also lauded the film's characterisation, feeling that the characters as a whole were well-developed. SYO of Cinemore called Kamiki's performance "intense and passionate" and wrote that the film "stands out" in Irie's filmography.

Haruhiko Kamijima, Morumotto Yoshida and Reiko Kitagawa of Kinema Junpo rated the film 4/5 stars, 3/5 stars and 2/5 stars respectively. Kamijima considered Tetsuhiko's arc and Kamiki's interactions with Furukawa a highlight, but felt that Ikuta's arc was "formulaic". Yoshida praised the "striking" cinematography but felt that the depictions of the lives of the Nox and the Kyurios were "superficial" and "disappointing." Kitagawa opined that the film's base premise is "simplistic and childish" and that the film fails to give it any "deeper meaning", though he admired Irie's "enthusiasm."

== Future ==
At the 2024 Tokyo International Film Festival, Irie announced that he was interested in directing a remake of the film at some point in the future.
