= Kaho (actress) =

Japanese actress and fashion model

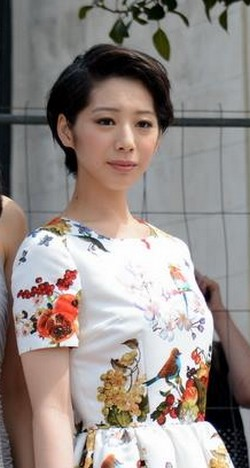
- Kaho at Cannes Film Festival in 2015
- Born: June 30, 1991 (age 35); Tokyo, Japan
- Years active: 2003–present
- Agent: Stardust Promotion
- Spouse: Sora Hokimoto (m. 2026)
- Awards: Hochi Film Award; Nikkan Sports Film Award; Japan Academy Prize
- Website: https://official.stardust.co.jp/kaho/

Signature
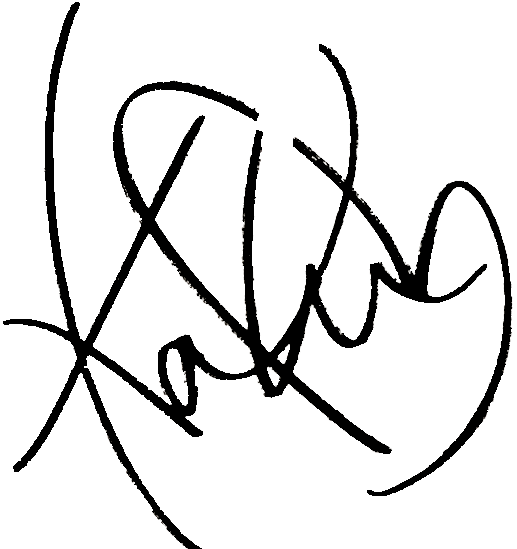

Kaho (夏帆; born June 30, 1991, in Tokyo, Japan) is a Japanese actress. Kaho has won multiple Japanese entertainment industry awards, including a Hochi Film Award, a Nikkan Sports Film Award, and a Japan Academy Prize.

== Career ==
Kaho was scouted in Omotesandō while still an elementary school student, and she began her career as a model for Japanese teen magazines. From 2004 to 2007, Kaho was the 11th Mitsui ReHouse Girl.

In 2007, Kaho won her first major acting prize, a Hochi Film Award in the Best New Artist category. In 2008 she won a Nikkan Sports Film Award for Best Newcomer, received a Best New Talent award at the 2008 Yokohama Film Festival for her performance in the film A Gentle Breeze in the Village, and was recognized as one of the Newcomers of the Year at the 31st Japan Academy Prize ceremony. Kaho played numerous TV and film roles throughout her teen years, but Mark Schilling of The Japan Times noted that she was often typecast as a "wide-eyed, pure-hearted innocent."

In 2016, Kaho was nominated for a 39th Japan Academy Prize in the Best Supporting Actress category for her performance in Our Little Sister, but did not win. In 2017 she played the role of K in the Sono Sion-directed Amazon Video drama Tokyo Vampire Hotel.

== Personal life ==
On September 15, 2026, Kaho announced her marriage to film director and musician Sora Hokimoto of the band Bialystocks.

== Filmography ==
=== Film ===
Year	Title	Role	Notes	Ref.
2006	Gamera the Brave	Mai Nishio		
2006	Mobile Detective: The Movie	Rei Zenigata	Lead role	
2007	A Gentle Breeze in the Village	Soyo Migita	Lead role	
2007	Mobile Detective: The Movie 2	Rei Zenigata	Lead role	
2008	Sing, Salmon, Sing!	Kasumi	Lead role	
2008	Tokyo Girl	Miho Fujisaki	Lead role	
2008	Sand Chronicles	Young Anne Minase	Lead role	
2010	Kinako	Kyoko Mochizuki	Lead role	
2012	Beautiful World	Akane Sendō		
2013	Blindly in Love	Naoko Imai		
2013	Time Scoop Hunter	Hikari Hosono		
2014	Puzzle	Azusa Nakamura	Lead role	
2015	Our Little Sister	Chika Kōda	Lead role	
2016	Pink and Gray	Sari "Sally" Ishikawa		
2016	The Kodai Family	Jun saitō		
2017	Memoirs of a Murderer	Miharu Kishi		
2017	Foreboding	Etsuko Yamagiwa	Lead role	
2018	The Many Faces of Ito	Miki Jinbo (D)		
2018	My Friend "A"	Miyoko Fujisawa		
2018	The Antique	Kinuko Goura		
2019	Blue Hour	Sunada	Lead role	
2019	Journey of the Sky Goddess	Takako Kojima	Lead role	
2020	Fictitious Girl's Diary	Takashi Sumida		
2020	A Beloved Wife	Yumi		
2020	Shape of Red	Tōko Muranushi	Lead role	
2020	Mother	Aya Takahashi		
2020	State of Emergency		Lead role, anthology film	
2022	The Fish Tale	Momoko		
2024	Worlds Apart	Nana Daigo		
2025	BAUS: The Ship's Voyage Continues	Hama		
2026	Unchained			

=== TV dramas ===
Year	Title	Role	Notes	Ref.
2004	My Life After Her Death	Yukari Ishii		
2004	Socrates in Love			
2004–05	Keitai Deka Zenigata Rei	Rei Zenigata	Lead role	
2005	The Queen's Classroom	Yu Kanda		
2005	Engine			
2006	Primadam			
2006	Adventures of the Super Monkey: Journey to the West			
2008	4 Shimai Tantei Dan	Yuriko Sasamoto	Lead role	
2009	Ikemen Sobaya Tantei	Reina	Episode 5	
2009	Otomen	Ryo Miyakozuka		
2010	Veterinarian Dolittle	Yui Mishima	Episode 8	
2011	Kare, Otto, Otoko Tomodachi	Ikuko Inuyama		
2011	Diplomat Kosaku Kuroda			
2012	Hitorishizuka	Shizuka Itō	Lead role; miniseries	
2012	Lucky Seven	Shiori Mochizuki		
2013	Minna! ESPer Dayo!	Miyuki Hirano		
2013	Akuryo Byoutou	Runa Ogami	Lead role	
2014	OL Kana no Ojisan Kansatsu Nikki	Kana Ito	Lead role	
2014	Nobunaga Concerto	Yuki		
2015	To Give a Dream	Miiha	Miniseries	
2015	Kurosaki-kun no Iinari ni Nante Naranai	Suzune	TV movie	
2016	Love Song	Mami Nakamura		
2016	Kamoshirenai Joyū tachi	Herself	TV movie	
2016	Kidnap Tour	Yūko	TV movie	
2017	Heaven	Seiko Doizaki	Miniseries	
2017	Fictitious Girl's Diary	Maki Fujikawa		
2017	Tokyo Vampire Hotel	K	Lead role; miniseries	
2017	Prison Princesses	Shinobu Edogawa		
2017	Foreboding	Etsuko Yamagiwa	Lead role; miniseries	
2017	The Many Faces of Ito	Miki Jinbo (D)	Miniseries	
2019	Naoto Shibui's Holiday	Takada		
2019	The Great White Tower	Kyoko Zaizen	Miniseries	
2019	Idaten	Rin Minobe	Taiga drama	
2019	Jun'ichi	Tamaki		
2019	Afro Tanaka	Maki	Miniseries	
2019	Nippon Noir: Detective Y's rebellion	Sara Fukami		
2019	Hitori Kyanpu de Kutte neru	Nanako	Lead role	
2022	Lost Man Found	Mari Akutagawa		
2022	Silent	Nana Momomo		
2022	First Love	Tsunemi		
2022	Modern Love Tokyo	Mai	Lead role; episode 4	
2025	The Hot Spot	Yumi Isomura		
2025	Beauty Salon in Prison	Natsu Komatsubara		
2025	Then You Try Making It!	Ayumi Yamagishi	Lead role	
2026	Until the T-shirt Dries	Azusa		
2027	Mawaru Swan	Kana Kitazawa	Asadora	

=== Advertising ===
- Asahi Breweries "Asahi Cocktail Partner: Colorful Time" national TV commercial, 2012
- Shiseido "Integrate" campaign, 2016

== Awards and nominations ==
Year	Award	Category	Result	Ref.
2007	32nd Hochi Film Award	Best New Artist	Won	
2008	21st Nikkan Sports Film Award	Best Newcomer	Won	
2008	31st Japan Academy Film Prize	Newcomers of the Year	Won	
2008	29th Yokohama Film Festival	Newcomers of the Year	Won	
2016	39th Japan Academy Film Prize	Best Supporting Actress	Nominated	
2023	16th Tokyo Drama Awards	Best Supporting Actress	Won	
2026	50th Elan d'or Awards	Elan d'or Award	Won	
