= Vigilante (2017 film) =

- Film poster
- Directed by: Yu Irie
- Written by: Yu Irie
- Produced by: Toramazu Mamiya; Toru Emori; Kazuhiro Ota; Yuji Haratai
- Starring: Nao Ōmori; Kosuke Suzuki; Kenta Kiritani
- Cinematography: Ryo Otsuka
- Edited by: Takashi Sato
- Music by: Shogo Kaida
- Production companies: Tokyo Theatres Company Inc. st'blue
- Distributed by: Tokyo Theatres Company Inc.
- Release date: 9 December 2017 (Japan)
- Running time: 125 minutes
- Country: Japan
- Language: Japanese

Vigilante (Japanese: ビジランテ) is a 2017 Japanese noir family drama film directed by Yu Irie, starring Nao Ōmori, Kosuke Suzuki and Kenta Kiritani. It follows three estranged brothers who reunite following the death of their father.

== Cast ==
- Nao Ōmori as Ichiro Shinto
- Kosuke Suzuki as Jiro Shinto
- Kenta Kiritani as Saburo Shinto
- Mariko Shinoda as Miki Shinto
- Kyusaku Shimada as Kosuke Kishi
- Yuki Mamiya as Saori
- Kaito Yoshimura as Rikuto Ishimara
- Hannya as Osako Momaru
- Izumi Okamura as Aya
- Shun Sugata as Takeo Shinto
- Yojin Hino
- Taka Takao
- Satoshi Sakata
- Yuuri Fukada as a call girl
- Saori Yagami as a call girl
- Anri Uda
- Kyoka Ichiyama
- Yoshihiro Sato as Yoshihiro Komatsu
- Kenkichi Watanabe

== Production ==
The idea for the film emerged when director Yu Irie started on genealogical research for a separate film, which was to be a period epic. This research led to him ruminating on blood ties and the meaning of family, which in turn resulted in Irie writing a screenplay on the matter, despite having shied away from focusing on familial relations in his previous films. At the time, he had also been looking to make a filmwith a "noir feel" intended for adults, as his previous works had possessed a "strong comedic tone." This was his first original screenplay since Roadside Fugitive. He decided on the title Vigilante as he wished to depict "how the individual is swallowed up by the community". In writing the script, he was "heavily influenced" by the works of filmmaker Takeshi Kitano, particularly on the theme of "pain". Irie decided on three main characters as he felt that he was "not good" at focusing on one central character. He told Real Sound that each of the three brothers reflects an aspect of his personality.

The film was shot on location in Irie's hometown of Fukaya, Saitama, though the film is set in a fictional town. Principal photography commenced in January 2017 and wrapped by early March. He claimed to have felt an "impetus" to return to Fukaya to shoot the film as the themes explored in the screenplay were "personal" and he wished to gain the "support" of the locals. Filming took place in the middle of winter and mostly at night. According to the Foreign Correspondents' Club of Japan, this "undeniably helped strip the performances by its three main stars of any artifice."

== Release ==
The film opened in theatres nationwide on 9 December. A discount for the film was introduced at the Theatre Shinjuku in Tokyo, wherein a group of three siblings would be able to purchase a ticket for ¥1,000 each.

== Reception ==
Naofumi Higuchi of Yahoo Japan felt that the film was the "pinnacle" of Irie's work thus far, describing the film's setting as "compellingly real and disturbing". Higuchi commended the characterisation of the three brothers and the performances of their actors, highlighting Suzuki's performance as "particularly noteworthy." He also praised Shinoda's "outstanding" and considered the relationship between her and Kiritani's characters a high point of the film. Morumotto Yoshida of Real Sound opined that the script is well-written and praised the performances of Shinoda, Yoshimura, Ōmori and Kiritani.

Okamura Ryo of zakII rated the film 4 stars out of 5, though he felt that it did not fully realise its potential. Reiko Kitagawa and Takeo Matsuzaki of Kinema Junpo separately gave the film a 4/5 rating. Kitagawa opined that the film was "rugged" and "down-to-earth", unlike many other recent Japanese films. He argued that the intensity of the violence well conveyed Irie's frustrations regarding the social issues depicted in the film, and praised the "passionate" lead performances, highlighting Kiritani's. On the other hand, Ryo Chiura, also of Kinema Junpo, gave the film a 3/5 rating. Chiura felt that the film was shot in a style that was distinctively Irie's, something which had been absent in Joker Game and Memoirs of a Murderer. He praised the characterisation and lauded Hannya's performance. Mark Schilling of The Japan Times rated the film 2.5 stars out of 5 and lauded Ōmori's performance, describing his presence as "oddly commanding".

The film was named the 10th worst Japanese film of 2017 in filmmagazine Eiga Geijutsu's annual 'Top 10 & Worst 10 Japanese Films' list, published in January 2018. The film was then nominated for the Best Screenplay award at the 72nd Mainichi Film Awards, which was held in Kanagawa the following month. It was also named the 5th best Japanese film of the year at the 27th Japan Film Professional Awards, held in April.
