= 27th Japan Film Professional Awards =

Japanese film awards in 2018

- Date: April 26, 2018
- Site: Theatre Shinjuku, Tokyo, Japan

The 27th Japan Film Professional Awards (Japanese: 第27回日本映画プロフェッショナル大賞, Hepburn: Dai 27-kai Nihon Eiga Purofesshonaru Taishō) was the 27th edition of the Japan Film Professional Awards. It awarded the best of 2017 in film. The ceremony took place on April 26, 2018, at Theatre Shinjuku in Tokyo.

== Awards ==
- Best Film: Tremble All You Want
- Best Director: Ryūichi Hiroki (Side Job)
- Best Actress: Mayu Matsuoka (Tremble All You Want)
- Best Actor: Tadanobu Asano (Dear Etranger)
- Emerging Director: Kei Ishikawa (Gukoroku: Traces of Sin)
- Emerging Actress: Kumi Takiuchi (Side Job)
- Emerging Actor: Nijirō Murakami (Mukoku)
- Special: OP Eiga (For many years of activity.)
- Special Achievement: Nobuhiko Obayashi (For his many years of service.)
- Audience: Wilderness (Selected by crowdfunding participants from the previous year.)

== 10 best films ==
1. Tremble All You Want (Akiko Ōku)
2. Dear Etranger (Yukiko Mishima)
3. Side Job (Ryūichi Hiroki)
4. Gukoroku: Traces of Sin (Kei Ishikawa)
5. Vigilante (Yu Irie)
6. Bangkok Nights (Katsuya Tomita)
7. Birds Without Names (Kazuya Shiraishi)
8. Mukoku (Kazuyoshi Kumakiri)
9. And Then There Was Light (Tatsushi Ōmori)
10. Pumpkin and Mayonnaise (Masanori Tominaga)
