= A Girl Named Ann =

- DVD cover
- Directed by: Yu Irie
- Written by: Yu Irie
- Produced by: Yukiko Tanigawa; Tomohiko Seki
- Starring: Yuumi Kawai; Jiro Sato; Goro Inagaki; Aoba Kawai; Yuriko Hirooka; Akari Hayami
- Cinematography: Hideho Urata
- Edited by: Sato Takashi
- Music by: Goro Yasukawa
- Production company: Cognitoworks
- Distributed by: Kino Films
- Release date: 7 June 2024 (Japan)
- Running time: 113 minutes
- Country: Japan
- Language: Japanese

A Girl Named Ann (Japanese: あんのこと) is a 2024 Japanese drama film directed by Yu Irie, starring Yuumi Kawai, Jiro Sato, Goro Inagaki, Aoba Kawai, Yuriko Hirooka and Akari Hayami. It follows Ann, a young woman who grew up in an abusive household and developed a drug addiction as she attempts to recover with the help of two men who enter her life, her efforts are derailed by a scandal and the onset of the COVID-19 pandemic in Japan. The film is based on a real-life incident.

== Cast ==
- Yuumi Kawai as Ann Kagawa
- Jiro Sato as Tamotsu Tatara
- Goro Inagaki as Tatsuki Kirino
- Aoba Kawai as Harumi Kagawa
- Yuriko Hirooka as Emiko Kagawa
- Akari Hayami as Sara Misumi
- Masaaki Akahori as Kondô
- Mutsuo Yoshioka as Kato
- Asana Mamoru as Mano Miyabi
- Katsuya Kobayashi as Hara
- Kyuichiro Nakayama as Sakamoto
- Ryuji Mori as Uema Yohei
- Akiko Takeuchi as Kitayama

== Production ==
The film is based on two articles in The Asahi Shimbun published in the summer of 2020. They covered the life of a woman pseudonymously referred to as "Hana", who had grown up in an abusive household, turned to prostitution and developed a drug addiction, and whose attempt at recovery was cut short by the onset of the COVID-19 pandemic in Japan, which eventually led to her taking her own life. Producer Kunizane Mizue, the head of the Dongyu Club talent management agency, felt "shocked" and "outraged" after reading the articles and decided to "preserve" the woman's legacy. Kunizane then approached Yu Irie to direct a film adaptation of the story, having previously worked with him on the 2017 film Vigilante. This was the first Irie's first film to be based on a real-life event. Irie told Screen Daily that he had agreed to direct the film as he wanted to "understand what ["Hana"] felt and why she fell into despair", as well as to "understand" the feelings of a close friend of his who had taken his own life around the same period. Additionally, he wished to depict the pandemic period as a whole. Actress Yuumi Kawai was cast as the lead shortly after. In December 2023, it was announced that Jiro Sato, Goro Inagaki, Aoba Kawai, Yuriko Hirooka and Akari Hayami had been cast.

Irie claimed that in writing the script, he chose not to focus entirely on the "tragic" aspects of the protagonist's life as he did not wish to depict her as "someone to be pitied"., instead deciding to portray her "with a level of respect". Both Kawai and Irie interviewed the journalist who penned the Asahi Shimbun stories, though the journalist was unable to reveal much personal information about "Hana" due to confidentiality reasons. According to Kawai, while the film is an adaptation of real-life events, Irie chose not to "recreate" "Hana", instead conceiving of a separate fictional character modelled after "Hana". Irie named the protagonist "Ann" in a reference to the 1958 Mikio Naruse film Anzukko. The screenplay largely adheres to the events of the story on which the film is based, though a notable exception is the introduction of a plotline in which a neighbour, portrayed by Hayami, leaves her son under Ann's care, which was completely invented for the film. Irie stated that he had introduced this plot twist to demonstrate that Ann was capable of breaking the cycle of violence. Additionally, the scandal involving the detective, which occurred after "Hana"'s death in reality, takes place before Ann's death in the film.

Principal photography took place in the middle of 2023. The film was shot on location in the Akabane neighbourhood in Tokyo. It features several "long" and "unbroken" takes, which was a first for Irie. Production was overseen by a Non-Profit Organisation which aids drug addicts in rehabilitation and reintegration into society.

== Release ==
The film's premiere screening was held on 8 May 2024. It was opened in 58 theatres in Japan on 7 June. Positive word of mouth spread in the weeks following and screenings for the film were reportedly selling out two weeks after its release. By July, the film had expanded to 62 theatres and had grossed over ¥1,000,000, making it a box office hit. In that month, the film screened at the 2nd Da Nang Asian Film Festival held in Da Nang, Vietnam, where it won the Special Jury Prize. Kawai also received the Best Actress award for her performance in the film. A Girl Named Ann was one of five Yu Irie films to screen at the 37th Tokyo International Film Festival, held in late 2024, under the "Nippon Cinema Now" section. The film was released to Amazon Prime Video on 13 September. It was released on Blu-ray and DVD on 5 March 2025.

The film had its North American premiere at the 2025 Japan Cuts film festival in New York City, held in July.

== Reception ==
Reiko Kitagawa of Kinema Junpo gave the film a 5/5 rating, calling the direction "thoroughly realistic" and praising Kawai's "painful" and "powerful" performance. Adachi Miyuki of Movie Walker Press called the film a "must-see gem". SYO of GQ Japan opined that the film's "power" lies in its ability to challenge one's worldview. SYO further praised Kawai's presence and "passionate" and "powerful" performance. Announcer Hirota Miyuki of the Nippon Broadcasting System lauded the film's message and the performances of Kawai, Sato and Inagaki. Ito Satori of the magazine Glow also lauded their performances. Additionally, she praised Irie's decision not to explicitly depict Ann's prostitution and drug use, which she felt were, in this case, unnecessary, "painful to watch" and "stressful" for the actors. Makoto Toda of Hanako magazine also praised the decision to avoid sensationalising the events such as to preserve "Hana"'s dignity. Toda also praised the direction, the performances and the editing.

Filmmaker Yoshiki Takahashi, writing for Weekly Playboy, gave the film a score of 3.5 out of 5. James Hadfield of The Japan Times rated the film 3 stars out of 5 and called it "an engrossing and sensitively depicted portrayal of life at the margins of Japanese society", particularly in its first half. He praised Kawai's "impressive" performance and the work of Urata, lighting director Yoshio Tsunetani and production designer Setsuko Shiokawa. Critics Atsushi Okamoto and Ichiro Yoshida, both of Kinema Junpo, were more critical, giving the film a 2/5 and a 1/5 rating respectively. Okamoto opined that while the film was "powerful", it failed to consider the perspective of social workers, and that the "fact that the focus is on criticizing the lack of care in weekly magazine reporting rather than depicting the repentance of those involved in scandals is a real problem in the industry itself." Yoshida praised the performances of Sato and Kawai, but found it "unsurprising" that the latter could act well.

Some critics took issue with the plot twist involving the neighbour's son. Hadfield considered the twist "bizarre", particularly due to its lack of basis in reality, arguing that this "ends up undermining much of the work the film had done in showing how the pandemic affected society’s most vulnerable." Yoshida was "astonished" by the "selfishness" of Hayami's character and considered this deviation from real-life events to be "opportunistic."

The film was included on Eiga.com's list of the best films for the first half of 2024. The film was well received by audiences, with the film's average score on the rating websites Eiga.com and Filmarks being 4.2/5 as of June 2024. According to Matt Schley of Screen Daily, Kawai's role in the film contributed to her having a "breakout year", along with her roles in Look Back and Desert of Namibia.
