= 37th Tokyo International Film Festival =

2024 Japanese film festival

- Official poster of the 37th Tokyo International Film Festival
- Opening film: 11 Rebels by Kazuya Shiraishi
- Closing film: Marcello Mio by Christophe Honoré
- Location: Tokyo, Japan
- Founded: 1985
- Awards: Tokyo Grand Prix: Teki Cometh by Daihachi Yoshida
- Hosted by: UNIJAPAN; Ministry of Economy, Trade and Industry; Japan Foundation; Tokyo Metropolitan Government
- Artistic director: Koshino Junko
- No. of films: 208
- Festival date: Opening: October 28, 2024; Closing: November 6, 2024
- Website: 2024 TIFF

Tokyo International Film Festival
- 38th 36th

The 37th Tokyo International Film Festival took place from 28 October to 6 November 2024. This edition, introduced a new 'Women's Empowerment' section and showcased the works of director Yu Irie, a Japanese film director and screenwriter in its 'Nippon Cinema Now' strand. Hong Kong actor and singer Tony Leung served as jury president.

The festival opened with Japanese samurai, period action film 11 Rebels by Kazuya Shiraishi, and a unique mix of video, music, and dance, featuring performances by Sarah Àlainn, Leo, KAF, Oi Kazuya, and dancers Ikeda Mika and Suzuki Yohei. A video introduction followed, showcasing the lineup and upcoming awards, with KAF acting as master of ceremonies alongside Leo and Oi.

Béla Tarr a Hungarian filmmaker, was honoured with Lifetime Achievement Award during a Special Talk event at the festival, held on November 1.

The festival closed on 6 November with Marcello Mio, a comedy film directed by French director and writer Christophe Honoré and starring French actresses Chiara Mastroianni and Catherine Deneuve. It screened 208 films, with 61,576 admissions and another 96,866 people attending related events. Teki Cometh a Japanese film by Daihachi Yoshida was awarded Tokyo Grand Prix award.

== Overview ==
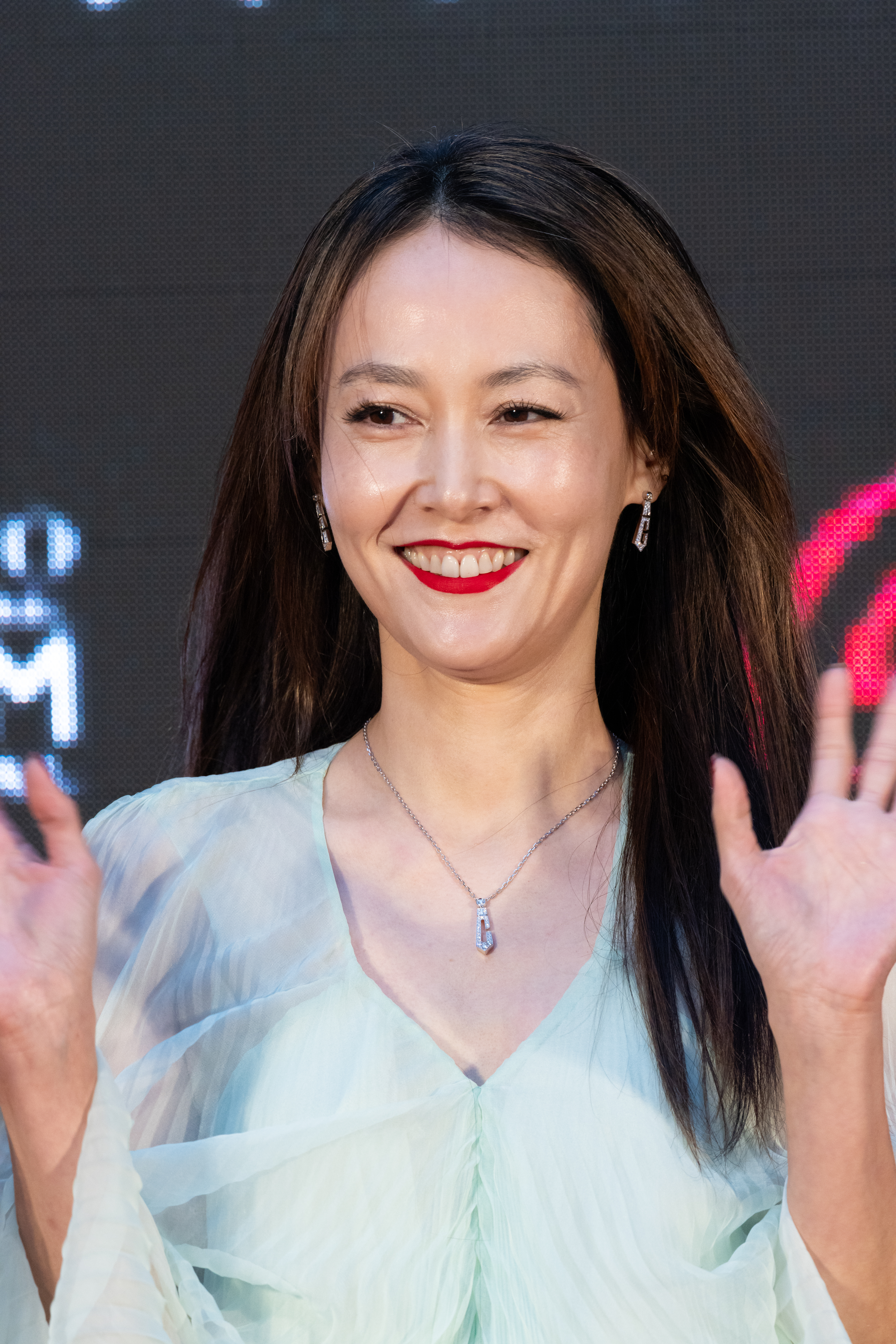
Rinko Kikuchi festival navigator at the red carpet

The film registration for the festival began in April 2024 with the closing date for submission fixed for July 8, 2024.

The official poster for the festival was created by fashion designer Koshino Junko, who has designed TIFF's visuals since 2021 and features Japanese actress Rinko Kikuchi. She has also been appointed this year's festival navigator. She will "navigate" the audience at official events as the face of the festival.

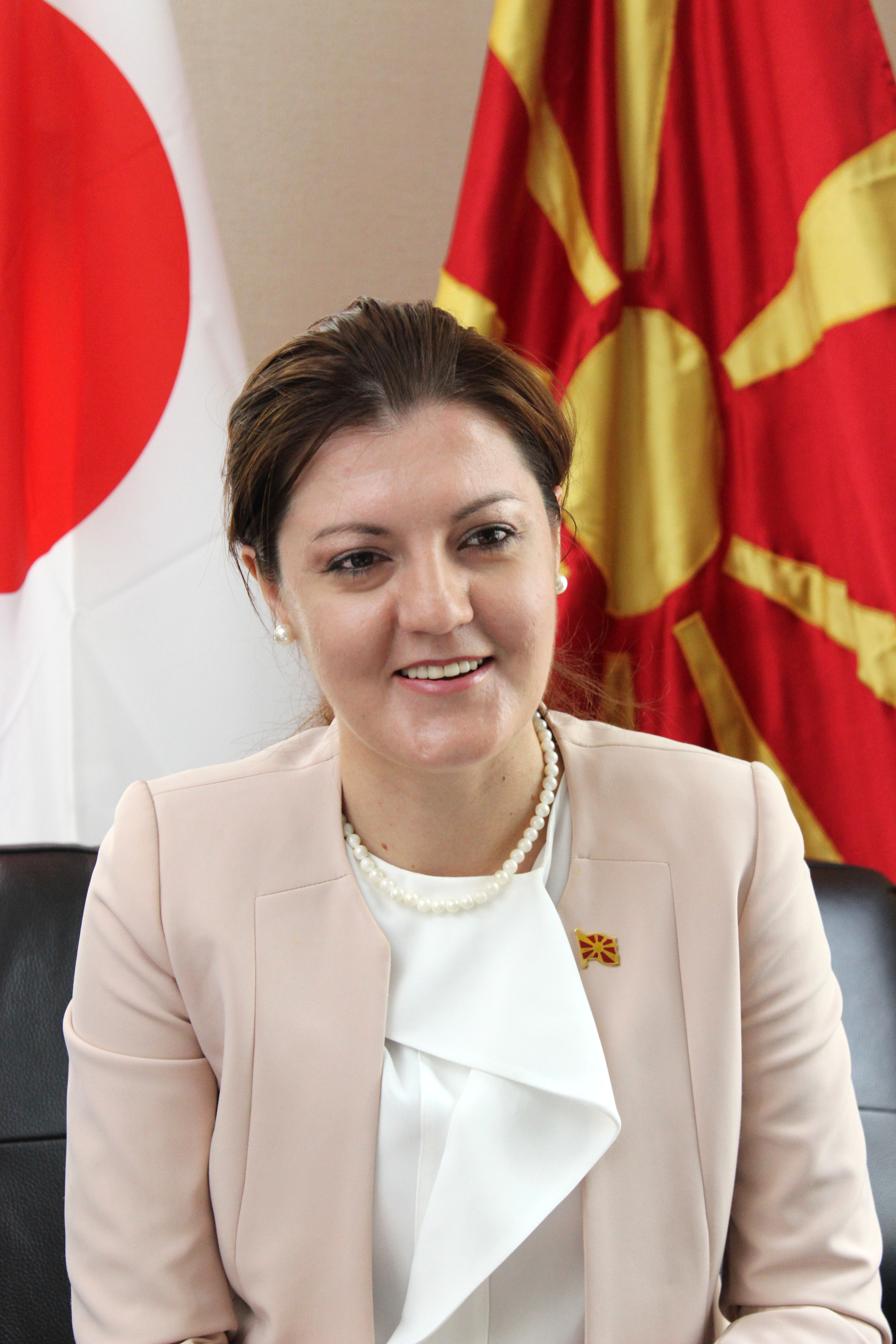
Andrijana Cvetkovikj in 2015

A new section 'Women's Empowerment' was introduced this year, which will highlight features made by female directors as well as female-focused films. Andrijana Cvetkovik, a film director and former Macedonian ambassador to Japan will serve as the Women's Empowerment senior programmer and select seven new films to be showcased as the main feature. In addition, a symposium and special screening with talk session focusing on related themes will also be held.

On 11 September 2024, opening and closing films of the festival were announced. On 20 September Gala Selection and trailer with festival Song was unveiled. The full lineup was announced on 25 September 2024, lining up 110 films for showcasing in the festival.

== Juries ==
The juries consists of the following members:

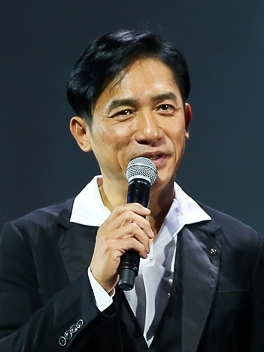
Tony Leung

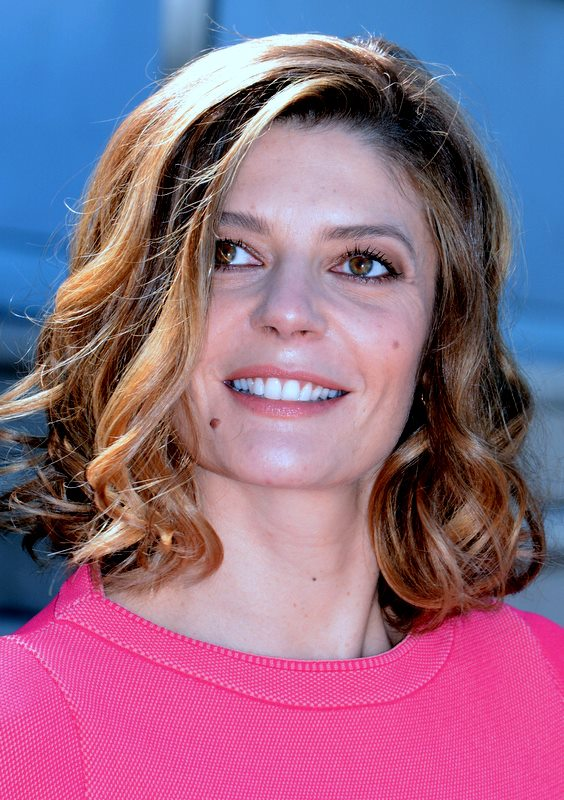
Chiara Mastroianni

=== Main competition ===
- Tony Leung, Hong Kong actor and singer – Jury president
- Johnnie To, Hong Kong filmmaker
- Ildikó Enyedi, Hungarian film director and screenwriter.
- Ai Hashimoto, Japanese actress, fashion model and singer.
- Chiara Mastroianni, French actress and singer

=== TIFF Ethical Film Award ===
- Takumi Saitoh, Japanese actor and filmmaker, President of the jury

== Opening and closing ceremonies ==
The opening ceremony took place at the Tokyo Takarazuka Theater on 28 October, with a distinctive blend of video, music, and dance, highlighting performances by vocalist-violinist Sarah Àlainn, koto player Leo, virtual singer KAF, drummer Oi Kazuya, and dancers Ikeda Mika and Suzuki Yohei. A video introduction followed, presenting the festival's lineup and upcoming awards, with KAF serving as the emcee alongside Leo and Oi. The closing ceremony was held at Toho Cinemas Hibiya on 6 November. It opened with a video showcasing festival highlights, featuring clips and snapshots from indoor and outdoor stage events, Question & Answer sessions, masterclasses, symposia, and TIFF Lounge discussions. Awards were then announced, concluding with the Tokyo Grand Prix, which went to Daihachi Yoshida’s Teki Cometh, accompanied by a prize of ¥3 million.

== Events ==
- Kering “Women In Motion”: A talk session focusing on women in arts and culture on 1 November 2024 at TOHO Cinemas Nihonbashi Screen7. The talk will feature actor Rinko Kikuchi, actor Hayato Isomura and Netflix producer Okano Makiko.
- MPA seminar: It will focus on the latest trends in international production, such as the use of Generative AI and VFX technologies to enhance production.
- TIFF Lounge Co-presented by The Japan Foundation & Tokyo International Film Festival: A place for filmmakers in Tokyo to interact with each other, where various talk events will be held under the planning of the committee members.
  - Conversation between Payal Kapadia and Kore-eda Hirokazu on 29 October
  - Conversation between Eric Khoo and Mike Wiluan on 30 October
  - Conversation between Johnnie To and Irie Yu on 31 October
  - Nippon Cinema Now Talk Session: How We Make Films on 1 November
  - Conversation between Nia Dinata and Yukiko Mishima on 3 November

== Screening venues ==
The following 8 venues will host the festival screenings.

- Marunouchi TOEI
- Marunouchi Piccadilly
- Toho Cinemas Hibiya
- Yurakucho Yomiuri Hall
- Kadokawa Cinema Yurakucho
- Humantrust Cinema Yurakucho
- Cine Switch Ginza
- Toho Cinemas, Chanter

== Official Selection ==
The festival from this year will consist of ten main sections.

- International Competition
- Asian Future
- Gala Selection
- World Focus
- Nippon Cinema Now
- Animation
- Japanese Classics
- Youth
- TIFF Series
- Women's Empowerment

=== Opening and closing films ===
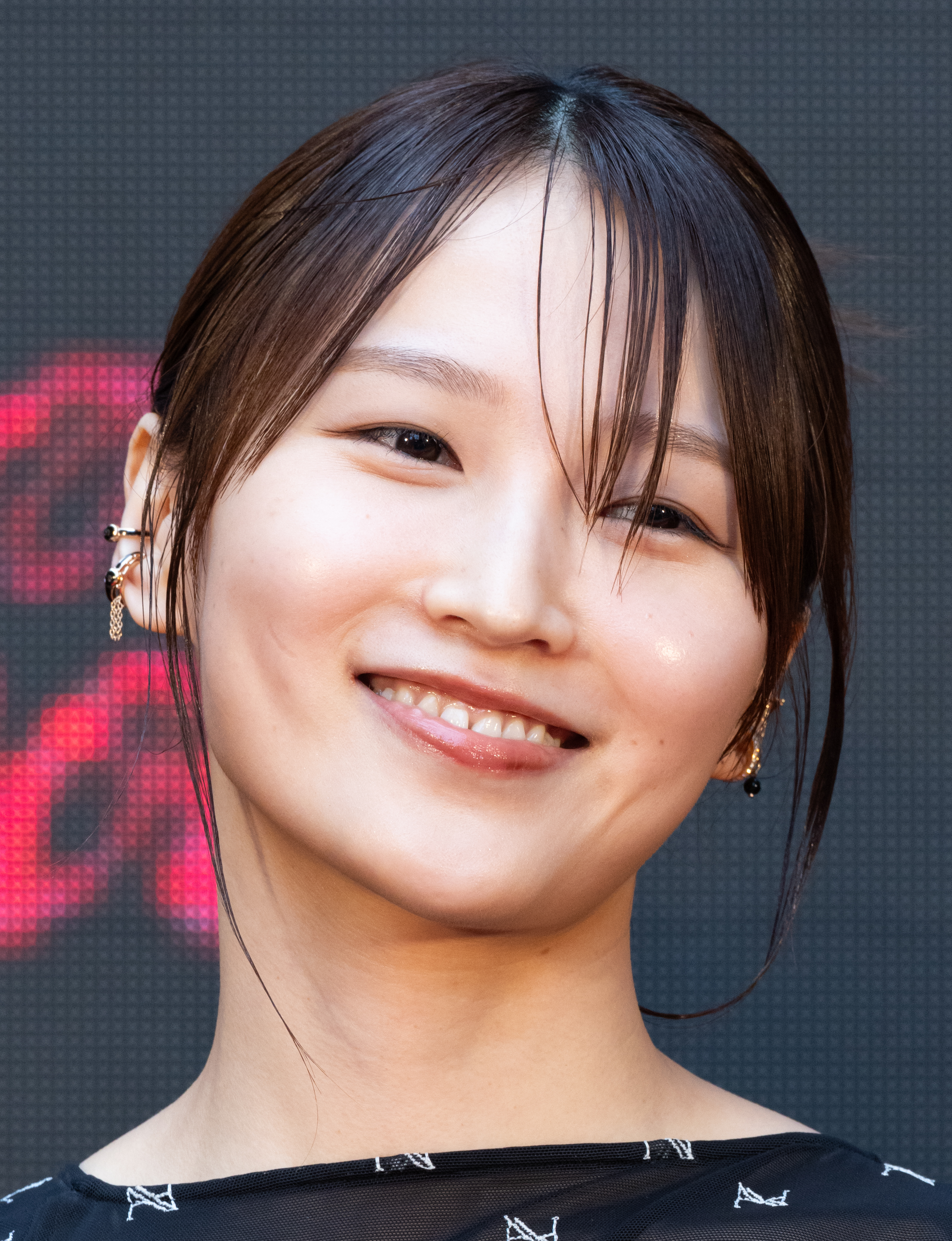
Riho Sayashi, of 11 Rebels, the opening film at the red carpet

English title	Original title	Director(s)	Production country(ies)
Opening film
11 Rebels	十一人の賊軍	Kazuya Shiraishi	Japan
Centerpiece Screening
Gladiator II		Ridley Scott	United States, United Kingdom
Closing film
Marcello Mio		Christophe Honoré	France, Italy

=== International Competition ===
English Title	Original Title	Director(s)	Production Country
Adios Amigo		Iván David Gaona	Colombia
Big World		Yang Lina	China
Bury Your Dead	Enterre Seus Mortos	Marco Dutra	Brazil
Cadet		Adilkhan Yerzhanov	Kazakhstan
Daughter's Daughter	女兒的女兒	Huang Xi	Taiwan
The Englishman's Papers	Os Papéis do Inglês	Sérgio Graciano	Portugal
In His Own Image		Thierry de Peretti	France
Lust in the Rain	雨中的慾情	Katayama Shinzo	Japan, Taiwan
My Friend Andre	我的朋友安德烈	Dong Zijian	China
Papa	爸爸	Philip Yung	Hong Kong
Promise, I'll Be Fine	Hore je nebo, v doline som ja	Katarína Gramatová	Slovakia, Czech Republic
She Taught Me Serendipity	今日の空が一番好き、とまだ言えない僕は	Akiko Ōku	Japan
Teki Cometh	敵	Daihachi Yoshida	Japan
Traffic	Reostat	Teodora Ana Mihai	Romania, Belgium, Netherlands
The Unseen Sister	乔妍的心事	Midi Z	China

=== Asian Future ===
The following films were selected to compete in the Asian Future section, which features films from Asian directors who have directed a maximum of three feature films.

English Title	Original Title	Director(s)	Production Country
Apollon by Day Athena by Night		Emine Yildirim Gaona	Turkey
Black Ox		Tsuta Tetsuichiro	Japan, Taiwan, United States
The Bora		Mohammad Esmaeilie	Iran
Pavane for an Infant	搖籃凡世	Chong Keat Aun	Malaysia
Sima's Song		Roya Sadat	Spain, Netherlands, France, Taiwan, Greece, Afghanistan
The Vessel's Isle	不游海水的鲸	Wang Di	United States
Three Castrated Goats	三个羯子	Ye Xingyu	United States
Missing Child Videotape	ミッシング・チャイルド・ビデオテープ	Kondo Ryota	Japan
Valley of the Shadow of Death	不赦之罪	Jeffrey Lam Sen, Antonio Tam	Hong Kong
Wait Until Spring		Ashkan Ashkani	Iran

=== Gala Selection ===
The following films were selected to be screened as part of the Gala Selection.

English Title	Original Title	Director(s)	Production Country
Black Dog	狗阵	Guan Hu	China
Emmanuelle		Audrey Diwan	France
Lumière! The Adventure Continues		Thierry Frémaux	France
Nightbitch		Marielle Heller	United States
Orang Ikan		Mike Wiluan	Singapore, Indonesia, Japan, United Kingdom
A Real Pain		Jesse Eisenberg	USA, Poland
Route 29		Morii Yusuke	Japan
Snowflowers: Seeds of Hope	雪の花 –ともに在りて	Takashi Koizumi	Japan
The Solitary Gourmet	孤独のグルメ	Yutaka Matsushige	Japan
Spirit World		Eric Khoo	France, Singapore, Japan
Sunset Sunrise	サンセット・サンライズ	Yoshiyuki Kishi	Japan
Twilight of the Warriors: Walled In	九龍城寨之圍城	Soi Cheang	Hong Kong
White Bird		Marc Forster	United States

=== World Focus ===
The following films were selected for the World Focus section, which focuses on international films.

English Title	Original Title	Director(s)	Production Country
8½	Otto e mezzo	Federico Fellini	Italy, France
Afternoons of Solitude	Tardes de soledad	Albert Serra	Spain, France, Portugal
A River Without Tears	怒江	Liu Juan	China
Bogancloch		Ben Rivers	United Kingdom, Germany, Iceland
A Brighter Tomorrow	Il sol dell'avvenire	Nanni Moretti	Italy, France
Bleak Street	La calle de la amargura	Arturo Ripstein	Spain, Mexico
The Castle of Purity	El castillo de la pureza	Arturo Ripstein	Mexico
Chain Reactions		Alexandre O. Philippe	United States
Dahomey		Mati Diop	Benin, France, Senegal
Dear Diary	Caro diario	Nanni Moretti	Italy, France
Deep Crimson	Profundo Carmesí	Arturo Ripstein	Mexico
Direct Action		Guillaume Cailleau and Ben Russell	Germany, France
Fire of Wind	Fogo do Vento	Marta Mateus	Portugal, Switzerland, France
Henry IV	Enrico IV	Marco Bellocchio	Italy
The Holy Office	El santo oficio	Arturo Ripstein	Mexico
Israel Palestine on Swedish TV 1958-1989	Israel Palestina på svensk TV 1958–1989	Göran Hugo Olsson	Sweden, Finland, Denmark
Kill the Jockey	El Jockey	Luis Ortega	Argentina, Spain, USA, Mexico, Denmark
La dolce vita		Federico Fellini	Italian, English, French, German
The Last Dance	破．地獄	Anselm Chan Mou Yin	Hong Kong
Mostly Sunny	阳光俱乐部	Wei Shujun	China
Pepe		Nelson Carlo De Los Santos Arias	Dominican Republic, Namibia, Germany, France
Phantosmia		Lav Diaz	Philippines
The Place Without Limits	El lugar sin límites	Arturo Ripstein	Mexico
Red Wood Pigeon	Palombella rossa	Nanni Moretti	Italy
The Room Next Door	La habitación de al lado	Pedro Almodóvar	Spain
The Stranger	Lo straniero	Luchino Visconti	Italy
Sunflower	: I girasoli	Vittorio De Sica	Italian, Russian
The Wailing	El llanto	Pedro Martín-Calero	Spain, France, Argentina

=== Nippon Cinema Now ===
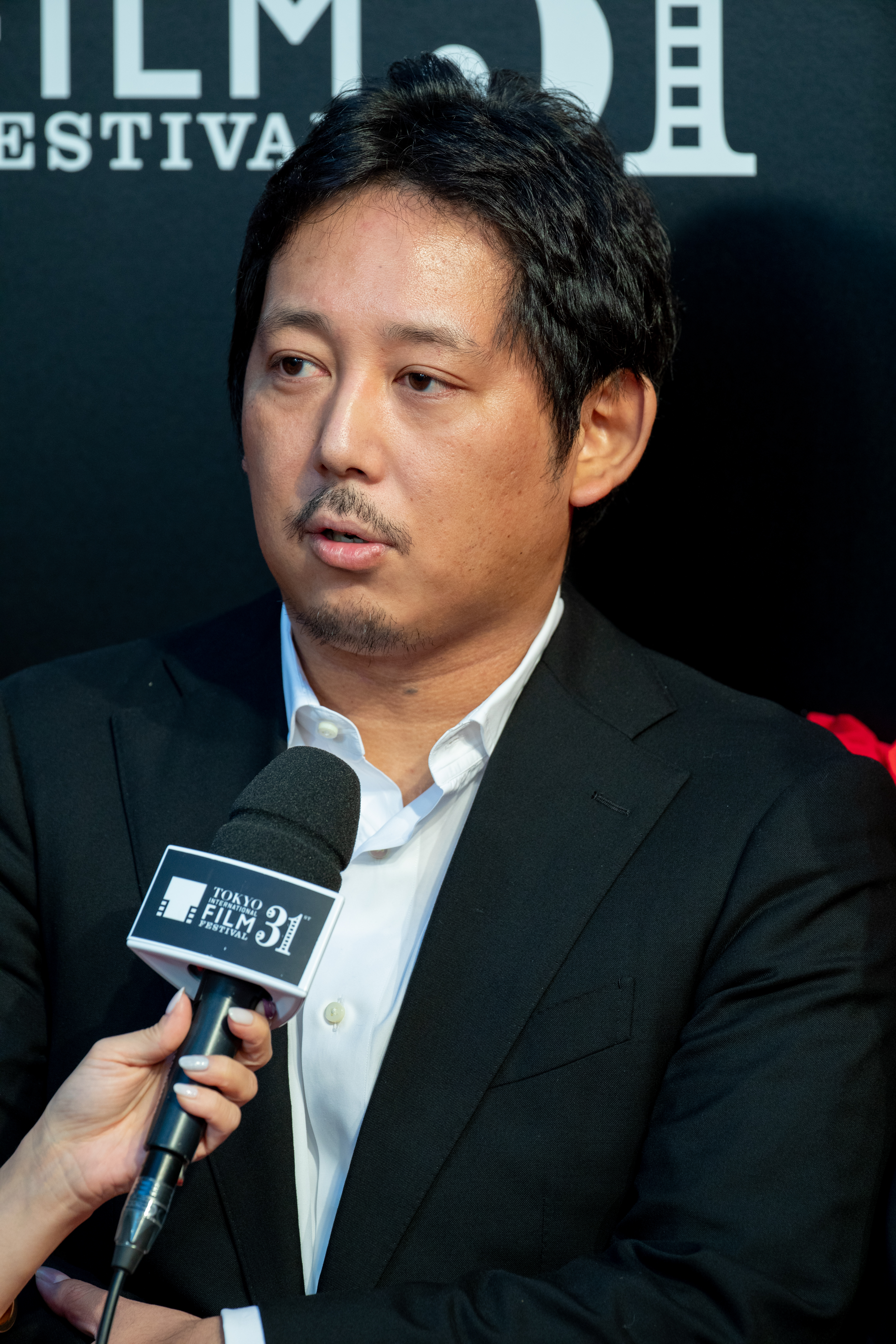
Yu Irie in TIFF 2018

The following films were selected for Nippon Cinema Now, which will showcase the works of director Yu Irie, a Japanese film director and screenwriter.

Year	English Title	Original Title
2009	8000 Miles	SRサイタマノラッパー
2010	8000 Miles 2: Girl Rappers	SRサイタマノラッパー
2012	Roadside Fugitive	SRサイタマノラッパー ロードサイドの逃亡者
2016	The Sun (2016 film)	太陽
2024	A Girl Named Ann	あんのこと

=== Animation ===
The following films were selected for the Animation section.

English Title	Original Title	Director(s)	Production Country
A Few Moments of Cheers	数分間のエールを	Popreq	Japan
Flow	Straume	Gints Zilbalodis	Latvia, France, Belgium
Olivia & the Clouds	Olivia & Las Nubes	Tomás Pichardo Espaillat	Dominican Republic
Ghost Cat Anzu	化け猫あんずちゃん	Yōko Kuno, Nobuhiro Yamashita	Japan, France

=== Japanese Classics ===
The following films were selected for the Japanese Classics section.

Year	English Title	Original Title	Director(s)
1965	Abashiri Prison	網走番外地	Teruo Ishii
1954	Godzilla	ゴジラ	Ishirō Honda
1964	Japanese Yakuza	日本俠客伝	Masahiro Makino
1966	Nakano Spy School 4K Digital Remaster	陸軍中野学校 4Kデジタル修復版	Masumura Yasuzo
1979	Nomugi Pass Digitally Remastered in 4K	あゝ野麦峠 4Kデジタルリマスター版	Yamamoto Satsuo
1966	The Red Angel 4K Digital Remaster	赤い天使 4Kデジタル修復版	Masumura Yasuzo
1965	The Wife of Seisaku	清作の妻	Masumura Yasuzo
1965	Wolves, Pigs and Men	狼と豚と人間	Fukasaku Kinji

=== Youth ===
The following films were selected for the Youth section.

English Title	Original Title	Director(s)	Production Country
She Sat There Like All Ordinary Ones	开始的枪	Qu Youjia	China
Special Voice Performance by Yamazaki Vanilla	山崎バニラの活弁小絵巻 2024	Yamazaki Vanilla	Japan
The Sparrow in the Chimney	Der Spatz im Kamin	Ramon Zürcher	Switzerland
TIFF 2024: Teens Meet Cinema	TIFFティーンズ映画教室2024		Japan

=== TIFF Series ===
The following television series were selected for the TIFF Series section.

English Title	Original Title	Director(s)	Production Country
Disclaimer		Alfonso Cuarón	United States, Australia, Mexico
Scénarios & Exposé du film annonce du film "Scénario"		Jean-Luc Godard	France, Japan
The Dogs of Karma		Shiraishi Koji	Japan
The New Years	Los años nuevos	Rodrigo Sorogoyen, Sandra Romero, David Martín de los Santos	Spain

=== Women’s Empowerment ===
The following films were screened as a part of new section introduced this year selected by Andrijana Cvetkovikj, a film director and former Macedonian ambassador to Japan.

English Title	Original Title	Director(s)	Production Country
Adabana		Kai Sayaka	Japan, France
Doctor-X: Surgeon Michiko Daimon	ドクターX〜外科医・大門未知子〜	Tamura Naoki	Japan
In Ten Seconds	On Saniye	Ceylan Özgün Özçelik	Turkey
Ivo		Eva Trobisch	Germany
Maydegol		Sarvnaz Alambeigi	France, Germany, Iran
Memories of a Burning Body	Memorias de un cuerpo que arde	Antonella Sudasassi Furniss	Costa Rica, Spain
Montages of a Modern Motherhood	虎毒不	Oliver Chan	Hong Kong
My Favourite Cake	کیک محبوب من	Behtash Sanaeeha and Maryam Moqadam	Iran, France, Sweden, Germany

=== Searchlight Pictures 30th Anniversary Project ===
A special screening of six works of Searchlight Pictures to celebrate its 30th anniversary in 2024 will be screened.

Year	English title	Original title	Director(s)	Production country(ies)
2006	Little Miss Sunshine		Jonathan Dayton and Valerie Faris	United States
2009	500 Days of Summer		Marc Webb	United States
2014	The Grand Budapest Hotel		Wes Anderson	United States
2017	The Shape of Water		Guillermo del Toro	United States
2018	Isle of Dogs		Wes Anderson	United States, Germany
2019	Jojo Rabbit		Taika Waititi	United States, New Zealand, Czech Republic

=== Akira Kurosawa's Favorite Films ===
The following films were screened as a part of a section consisting of Japanese director Akira Kurosawa favorite films.

Year	English Title	Original Title	Director(s)	Production Country
1960	Breathless	À bout de souffle	Jean-Luc Godard	France
1940	The Great Dictator		Charlie Chaplin	United States
1983	Nostalghia		Andrei Tarkovsky	Soviet Union, Italy
1954	Seven Samurai	七人の侍	Kurosawa Akira	Japan
1985	The Time to Live and the Time to Die	童年往事	Hou Hsiao-hsien	Taiwan

== Special screening ==
English title	Original title	Director(s)	Production country(ies)
A Tapestry of a Legendary Land	只此青绿	Zhou Liya, Han Zhen	China
The Devil's Deal	대외비	Lee Won-tae	South Korea
Sidonie in Japan	Sidonie au Japon	Élise Girard	France
Venom: Let There Be Carnage		Ruben Fleischer	United States

== Awards ==
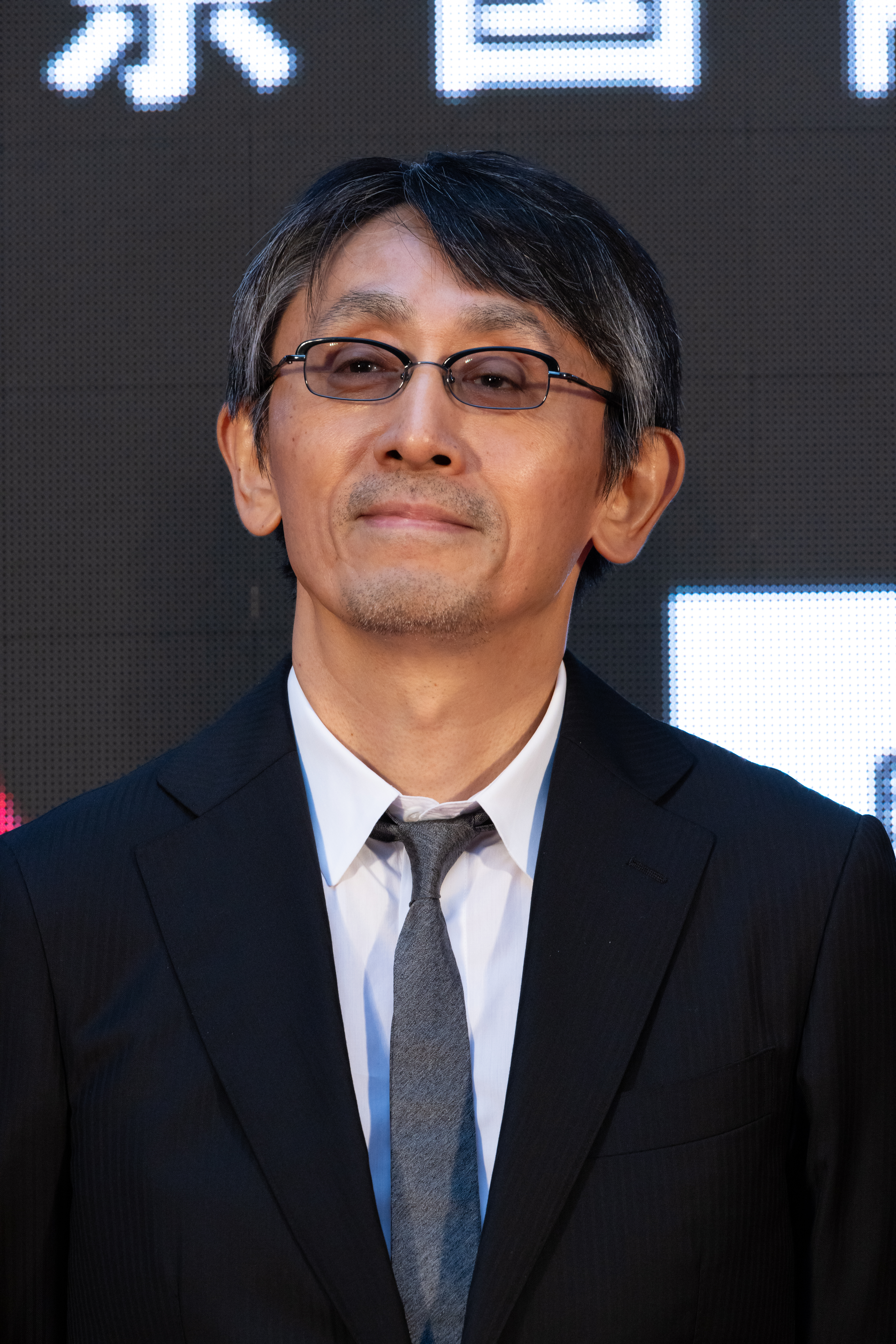
Daihachi Yoshida, winner of Best Film and Director award

- Grand Prix/The Governor of Tokyo Award: Teki Cometh by Daihachi Yoshida
- Special Jury Prize: Adios Amigo by Iván David Gaona
- Best Director: Daihachi Yoshida for Teki Cometh
- Best Actor: Kyōzō Nagatsuka for Teki Cometh
- Best Actress: Anamaria Vartolomei for Traffic
- Award for Best Artistic Contribution: My Friend An Delie by Dong Zijian
- Audience Award: Big World by Yang Lina
- Asian Future Best Film Award: Apollon by Day Athena by Night
- TIFF Ethical Film Award: Dahomey
- Kurosawa Akira Award:
  - Miyake Sho
  - Fu Tien-yu
- The Hollywood Reporter’s Trailblazer Award:
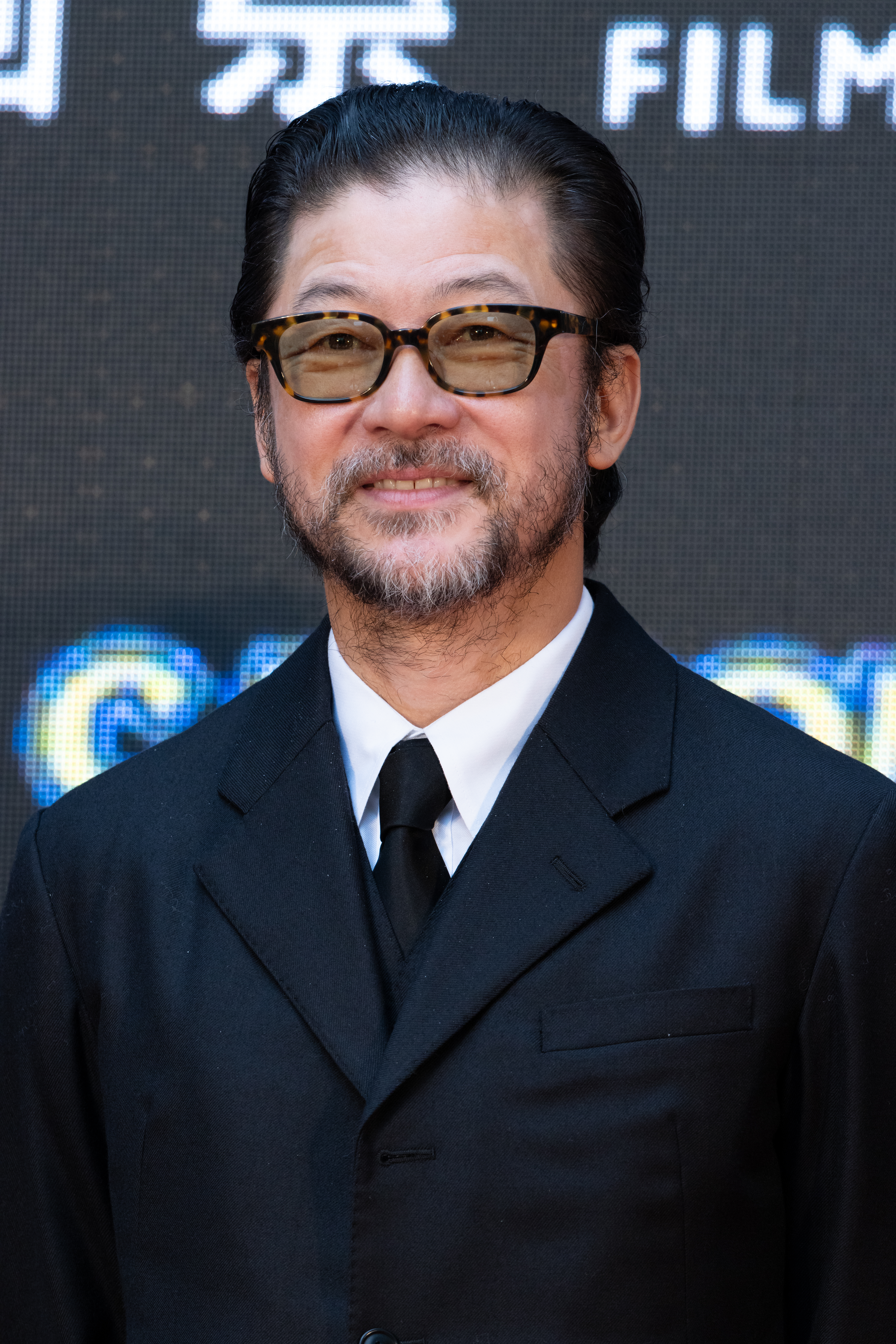
  Tadanobu Asano, Trailblazer Award winner
  - Tadanobu Asano, Japanese actor, director, and musician
- Lifetime Achievement Award:
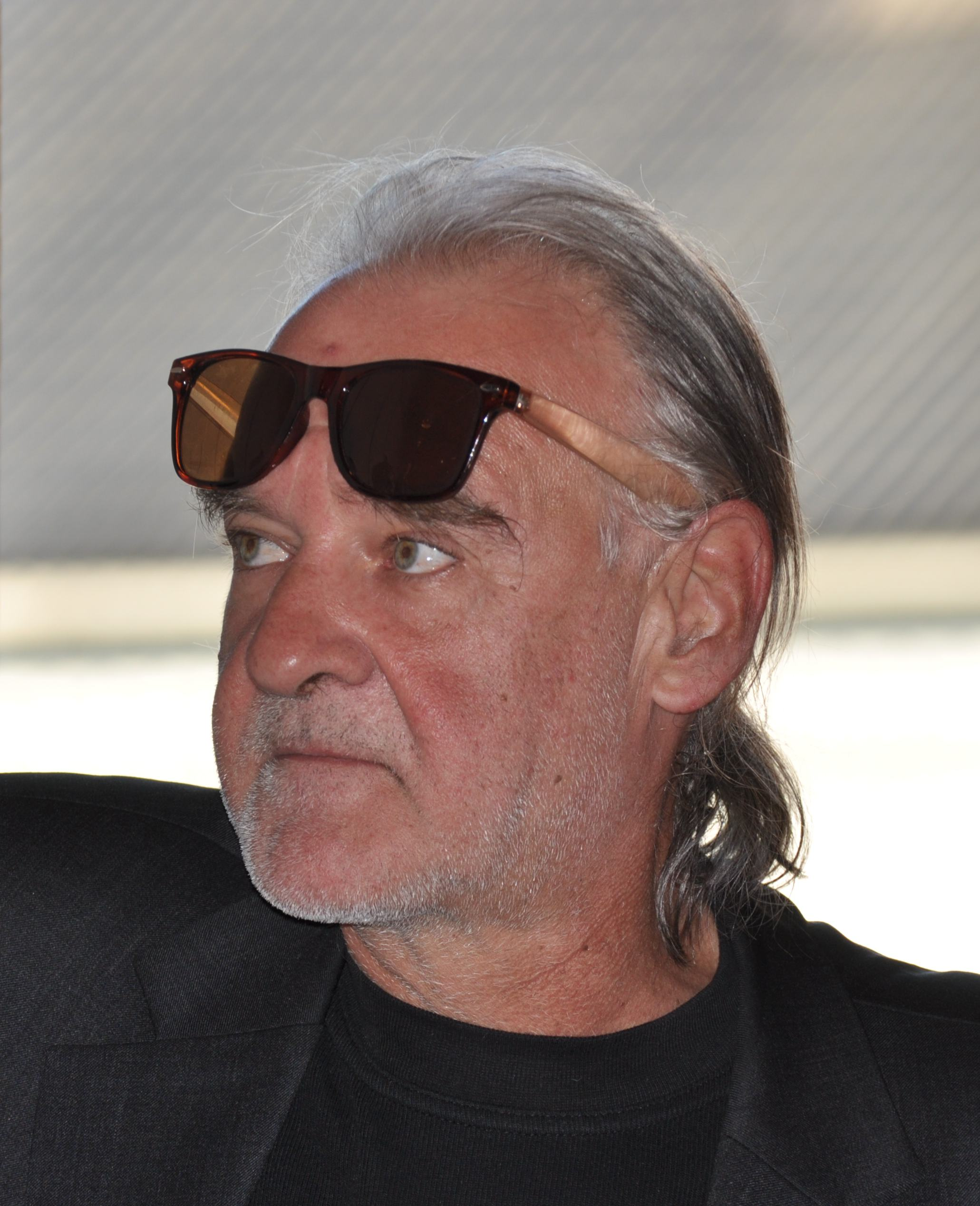
  Béla Tarr, Lifetime Achievement Award honree
  - Béla Tarr, Hungarian director, screenwriter, and producer
