= Foreboding (film) =

2017 film

- Film poster
- Directed by: Kiyoshi Kurosawa
- Written by: Kiyoshi Kurosawa; Hiroshi Takahashi
- Based on: Sanpo Suru Shinryakusha by Tomohiro Maekawa
- Starring: Kaho; Shōta Sometani; Masahiro Higashide
- Cinematography: Akiko Ashizawa
- Edited by: Koichi Takahashi
- Music by: Yusuke Hayashi
- Production companies: WOWOW; Pony Canyon
- Distributed by: Pony Canyon
- Release date: 11 November 2017 (Japan)
- Running time: 140 minutes
- Country: Japan
- Language: Japanese

Foreboding (Japanese: 予兆 散歩する侵略者, Hepburn: Yochō: Sanpo Suru Shinryakusha) is a 2017 Japanese science fiction film directed by Kiyoshi Kurosawa. It stars Kaho, Shōta Sometani, and Masahiro Higashide. It is a spin-off from his 2017 film Before We Vanish. It was originally produced as a five-part television series on WOWOW, and was re-edited for theatrical release in Japan on 11 November 2017. It was selected to screen in the Panorama section at the 68th Berlin International Film Festival in 2018.

== Plot ==
A clinical engineer, Tatsuo (Shōta Sometani), encounters a new doctor, Makabe (Masahiro Higashide), at the hospital. Makabe is an alien who came to invade Earth. Tatsuo is forced to be a guide to help Makabe collect human concepts. Etsuko (Kaho), who is Tatsuo's wife, notices that she is immune to the alien's influence. She tries to save her husband.

== Cast ==
- Kaho as Etsuko Yamagiwa
- Shōta Sometani as Tatsuo Yamagiwa
- Masahiro Higashide as Shirō Makabe
- Eriko Nakamura as Yoko Saiki
- Yukino Kishii as Miyuki Asakawa
- Junpei Yasui as Komori
- Kei Ishibashi as Kazuyo Kawauchi
- Mutsuo Yoshioka as Nogami
- Hirota Otsuka as Police officer
- Tetsuya Chiba as Tamotsu Asakawa
- Taro Suwa as Taoka
- Makiko Watanabe as Kasuya's wife
- Makoto Nakamura as Kasuya
- Ren Osugi as Nishizaki

== Release ==
The film was released in Japan on 11 November 2017. It screened in the Panorama section at the 68th Berlin International Film Festival on 21 February 2018.

== Reception ==
Jessica Kiang of Variety commented that "Foreboding plays like an unwieldy summary of Kurosawa's gloomy thematic preoccupations and his worst formal tendencies: It's overlong and lacking focus, and the underwater pacing and dissociative, somnolent acting style make it hard to invest in the human characters even before they've been partially zombified." Deborah Young of The Hollywood Reporter wrote, "This Berlin Panorama Special entry seems like an unnecessary variation on the first film, sharing most of its pros and cons, including some eerie moments, slow storytelling and excess length, but lacking its more spectacular action sequences." Contrastingly, Mark Schilling of The Japan Times stated that "Instead of recycling the earlier film, Yocho is quite different in story and tone ... darker and scarier from beginning to end."
