= Before We Vanish =

2017 film by Kiyoshi Kurosawa

- Theatrical release poster
- Directed by: Kiyoshi Kurosawa
- Written by: Kiyoshi Kurosawa; Sachiko Tanaka
- Based on: Sanpo Suru Shinryakusha; 2005 stage play by Tomohiro Maekawa and Ikiume Theatre Company
- Starring: Masami Nagasawa; Ryuhei Matsuda; Mahiro Takasugi; Yuri Tsunematsu; Hiroki Hasegawa
- Cinematography: Akiko Ashizawa
- Edited by: Koichi Takahashi
- Music by: Yusuke Hayashi
- Distributed by: Shochiku; Nikkatsu
- Release dates: 21 May 2017 (Cannes); 9 September 2017 (Japan)
- Running time: 129 minutes
- Country: Japan
- Language: Japanese

Before We Vanish (Japanese: 散歩する侵略者, Hepburn: Sanpo Suru Shinryakusha; transl. "Strolling Invaders") is a 2017 Japanese science fiction film directed by Kiyoshi Kurosawa. It is based on a stage play by Tomohiro Maekawa's Ikiume Theatre Company and the novel adaptation written by Maekawa. It stars Masami Nagasawa, Ryuhei Matsuda, Mahiro Takasugi, Yuri Tsunematsu, and Hiroki Hasegawa.

Before We Vanish earned two nominations at the 41st Japanese Academy Film Prize. The film had its world premiere in competition at the Un Certain Regard section of the 2017 Cannes Film Festival on 21 May 2017. The film also received an award at the Sitges Film Festival – Official Selection.

== Plot ==
An alien in the form of a schoolgirl named Akira (Yuri Tsunematsu) apparently kills her family, then walks carelessly down the middle of a street, causing an evading semi to overturn. A second alien has taken over the body of a man, Shinji (Ryuhei Matsuda), whose wife Narumi (Masami Nagasawa) is flustered by the profound changes to his personality. He asks her to guide him.

A third alien has taken over the body of a teenage boy, Amano (Mahiro Takasugi). He connects with a freelance journalist, Sakurai (Hiroki Hasegawa), who becomes his guide. Amano admits to Sakurai that he is an alien, and Sakurai eventually believes and assists him. The aliens do not threaten their guides. Amano and Sakurai ultimately track down Akira. The three travel together, although Sakurai is disturbed by Akira's violence.

The aliens are advanced scouts for a mass invasion of Earth. To learn how humans live and think, they steal themes or philosophical concepts from humans, who then can no longer understand them. Thus, alien Amano takes "freedom" from human Amano's parents and they become servile. Shinji takes "family" from Narumi's sister, who leaves while telling Narumi to back off. He later takes "possession" from a young shut-in, who proceeds to go out in the world as an advocate against materialism. Alien Shinji becomes, in many respects, a better husband to Narumi. "Shinji is broken," he says to Narumi, "I'll rebuild him."

Government authorities are working to locate Akira, claiming to the public and Sakurai that she's a spreader of a dangerous new virus. A state of emergency is declared, with the SDF becoming involved. Meanwhile, Amano and Akira must meet with Shinji to trigger the start of the invasion. Sakurai initially works to prevent this, but after the human forms of the two young aliens are killed, he tries to initiate the invasion himself.

Narumi invites Shinji to take "love" from her, and he does. He is overwhelmed by the feeling; he is surprised by how complicated "love" is. Meanwhile, Narumi no longer can feel emotion. Sakurai is dead after the attack from war plane. At the same time, Narumi and Shinji arrive at the hill where they can see the ocean. Suddenly, aliens start invading to the earth, and attack Narumi and Shinji, but they survive. The invasion is called off.

Two months later, aliens have retreated from Earth, and many humans have survived. However, many people have lost the concept of who they are, and have lasting physical and mental damage that has no clear way to cure.

Shinji was found to be working for the relief effort at the film's end while Narumi was hospitalized because she had lost the concept of love and all related emotions. Shinji said that the invasion stopped because the aliens learned from the humans. The relief doctor noted that at the time of the invasion humans faced many serious problems of their own making that no longer exist as a positive result of the Alien invasion.

== Cast ==
- Masami Nagasawa as Narumi Kase – Protagonist who is confused with dramatic change in her husband. However, she tries to welcome him as a member of family.
- Ryuhei Matsuda as Shinji Kase –Narumi's husband who has his body taken over by alien.
- Hiroki Hasegawa as Sakurai –Journalist who is looking answers about one family's murder.
- Mahiro Takasugi as Amano –A boy Sakurai contacts as he researches the case. Mysterious character.
- Yuri Tsunematsu as Akira Tachibana –High school student who has surprising athleticism. Violent alien.
- Atsuko Maeda as Asumi Kase
- Shinnosuke Mitsushima as Maruo
- Kazuya Kojima as Detective Kurumada
- Ken Mitsuishi as Suzuki
- Masahiro Higashide as a pastor
- Kyōko Koizumi as a doctor
- Takashi Sasano as Shinagawa

== Production ==
The production was conducted from the end of July to August 2016. Filming took place in Ibaraki Prefecture, Tochigi Prefecture, Saitama Prefecture, Shizuoka Prefecture, and Kanagawa Prefecture.

In Tochigi Prefecture, they used an abandoned factory as the survival game field appearing at the end of film. Additionally, in the end of August 2016, they used Kirin Beer factory as the wasteland.

The home where Narumi and Shinji lived was shot on location. Production designer, Ataka Norifumi, said that he put many diagonal lines or shapes on the inside of the house on purpose so that it could imply the awkwardness between Narumi and Shinji. Also, he mentioned that he took away warmer tone colors so that audience can see the low energy of the couple.

Akiko Ashizawa, Director of Photography, chose to shoot on Arri Alexa XT Plus with anamorphic lens.

== Music ==
The original soundtrack album was released on 6 September 2017 from Pony Canyon label. The soundtrack has 26 songs.

== Release ==
The film had its world premiere in the Un Certain Regard section at the 2017 Cannes Film Festival on 21 May 2017. It was released in Japan on 9 September 2017.

== Reception ==
=== Box office ===
In Japan, the film made $448,829 in its opening weekend.

=== Critics ===
On Rotten Tomatoes, the film has an approval rating of 79%, based on 48 reviews, and an average rating of 6.48/10. The website's critical consensus states, "Before We Vanish finds Kiyoshi Kurosawa working within well-established genre guidelines to take a poignant, surprisingly sincere look at the human condition." On Metacritic, which assigns a normalized rating, the film has a score 64 out of 100, based on 14 critics, indicating "generally favorable reviews".

Stephen Dalton of The Hollywood Reporter said, "Perpetually shifting gear between playful sci-fi pastiche, quirky rom-com and apocalyptic thriller, Before We Vanish might have worked better as a single dedicated genre, but it becomes a little scrambled trying to cover several at once." Hollywood Reporter gave a harsh critique on this film. He also pointed out its running time. He said it could have been shorter based on the plot events of the film. Its long duration created by director Kurosawa just led the audience to be impatient, and lost the suspense. Inconsistent elements can be seen in the film, he wrote; lack of explanation about Sakurai’s motivation for offering his body to the alien, or Narumi’s motivation for taking care of her situation with her husband rather than saving the Earth. Lastly, he mentioned that last action sequences are too late to show though their visuals were spectacular. After all, they sum up the review with this sentence “With the tonally incontinent Kurosawa at the helm, it is hard to tell which.”

Meanwhile, Maggie Lee of Variety said, "Playing frequently like an absurdist political satire with only flashes of violence, this low-tension, drawn-out work won't gratify the chills or adrenaline rushes fanboys crave, but the ending strikes a romantic chord so pure that all but the most jaded cynics will be moved."

Simon Abrams wrote a review on Roger Ebert.com. He started off saying that 130 minutes running time is too long considering the amount of character development and plots of Alien invasion drama. He also mentioned that there is not much reasoning for the character's behavior. For example, towards the end of the film, human guides start building deeper connections with invaders, but sometimes clear reasons are not shown in the film. However, he acclaimed Kurosawa’s direction for actors He pointed out that some people do not like the emotional flow happening in the movie, unnatural dialogue, lack of character development. After all, he recommends this film because of its unique concept that aliens try to steal concepts from humans. RogerEbert.com gave the film 3 out of 4 stars, commenting that "its naive hopefulness is infectious, and its big ideas are captivating."

Based on the review done by Film Inquiry, Before We Vanish gave a good impression. They gave high acclaims for the way Kurosawa directed the science fiction film. Specifics mentioned were the uniqueness of the young girl covered by blood, and violent visual images that referred to 1950s Science Fiction.They said “This extraterrestrial attempt at understanding human emotion through a series of concepts is a clever idea.” The plot of the film went over the expectations that viewers have towards standard science fiction films featuring aliens. However they pointed out that some critics thought the film duration could have been cut shorter, though it is 130 minutes long; they thought some plot points were “needlessly drawn out”.

== Accolades ==
Award	Date of ceremony	Category	Recipient(s)	Result	Ref(s)
Japan Academy Film Prize	2 March 2018	Director of the Year	Kiyoshi Kurosawa	Nominated	
Japan Academy Film Prize	2 March 2018	Outstanding Performance by an Actress in a Leading Role	Masami Nagasawa	Nominated	
Tokyo Sports Film Award	25 February 2018	Best Actress	Masami Nagasawa	Won	
Mainichi Film Awards	15 February 2018	Best Actress	Masami Nagasawa	Won	
Mainichi Film Awards	15 February 2018	Best New Actor	Mahiro Takasugi	Won	
Cannes Film Festival	2017	Prize of Un Certain Regard	Kiyoshi Kurosawa	Nominated	
Cannes Film Festival	2017	Directing Prize of Un Certain Regard	Kiyoshi Kurosawa	Nominated	
Cannes Film Festival	2017	Jury Prize - Un Certain Regard	Kiyoshi Kurosawa	Nominated	
Cannes Film Festival	2017	Un Certain Regard Award for Best Actress	Masami Nagasawa	Nominated	
Cannes Film Festival	2017	Prize for the Best Poetic Narrative - Un Certain Regard	Kiyoshi Kurosawa	Nominated	

== Legacy ==
Foreboding was created as a spin-off of Before We Vanish. It was released in theaters in Japan on 11 November 2017.
