= Naoto Ogata =

Japanese actor

- 緒形 直人
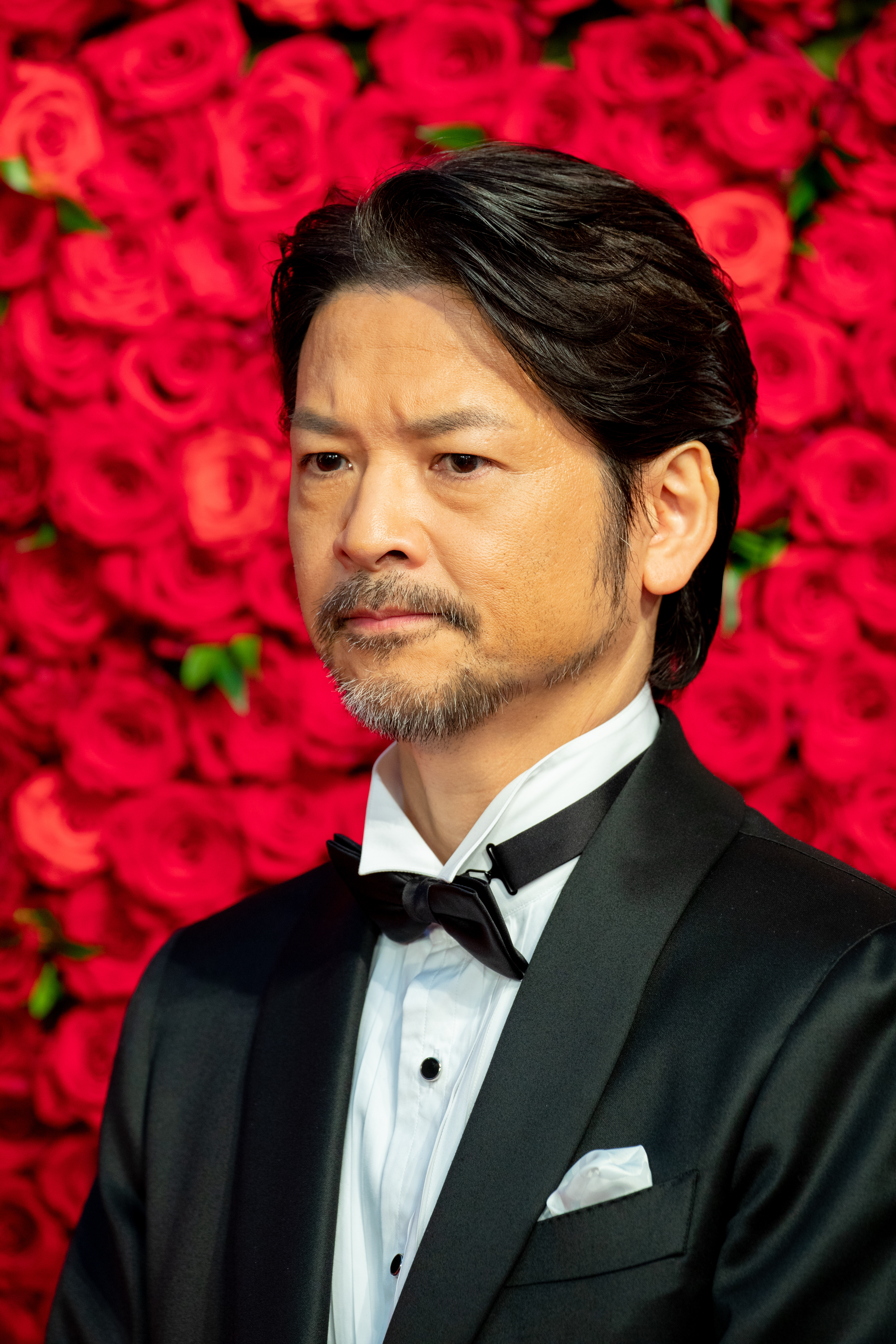
- Ogata at opening ceremony of Tokyo International Film Festival in 2018
- Born: September 22, 1967 (age 58); Yokohama, Japan
- Occupation: Actor
- Years active: 1988–present
- Agent: Office Koback
- Spouse: Nobuko Sendō (m. 1993)
- Parent: Ken Ogata (father)
- Relatives: Kanta Ogata (brother)

Naoto Ogata (緒形 直人, Ogata Naoto; born September 22, 1967 in Yokohama) is a Japanese actor.

== Biography ==
Ogata was born as the second son of Ken Ogata. He made his debut in the film Yūshun Oracion in 1988.

Ogata landed a lead role in the 1992 Taiga drama Nobunaga King of Zipangu, he played the role of Oda Nobunaga.

== Filmography ==
=== Film ===
Year	Title	Role	Notes	Ref(s)
1988	Yūshun Oracion	Hiromasa Wataumi	Lead role	
1990	Tasmania Story	Hiroshi Nakayama		
1996	Night Train to the Stars	Kenji Miyazawa	Lead role	
2010	Space Battleship Yamato	Daisuke Shima		
2012	Reunion	Ken'ichi Domon		
2013	A Tale of Samurai Cooking	Ōtsuki Denzō		
2016	64: Part I	Masato Mesaki		
2016	64: Part II	Masato Mesaki		
2017	Homecoming	Shōichirō Ōsaki		
2018	Samurai's Promise	San'emon Shinohara		
2018	Shoplifters	Yuzuru Shibata		
2019	Angel Sign		Silent film	
2020	Momi's House			
2020	Fukushima 50	Nojiri		
2021	In the Wake	Jōnouchi		
2021	The Cursed Sanctuary X	Eguchi		
2022	Riverside Mukolitta	Sawada		
2024	Sisam			
2025	Shinpei	Hogetsu Shimamura		

=== Television ===
Year	Title	Role	Notes	Ref(s)
1990	Tobu ga Gotoku	Saigō Jūdō	Taiga drama	
1992	Nobunaga	Oda Nobunaga	Lead role, Taiga drama	
2004	Socrates in Love	Sakutaro "Saku" Matsumoto (age 34)		
2005	Fight	Keita Kido	Asadora	
2011	Antarctica	Noriaki Uchiumi		
2019	MAGI Tensho Keno Shonen Shisetsu	Toyotomi Hideyoshi		
2020	The Return			
2022	Roppongi Class	Hirotsugu Matsushita		
2024	Antihero	Yusaku Shimizu		
2024	Omusubi	Takao Watanabe	Asadora	

== Awards and nominations ==
Year	Award	Category	Work	Result	Ref.
1988	31st Blue Ribbon Awards	Best Newcomer	Yūshun Oracion	Won	
1988	1st Nikkan Sports Film Award	Yūjirō Ishihara Newcomer Award	Yūshun Oracion	Won	
1989	12th Japan Academy Film Prize	Newcomer of the Year	Yūshun Oracion	Won	
1989	13th Elan d'or Awards	Newcomer of the Year	Himself	Won	
1997	20th Japan Academy Film Prize	Best Actor	Night Train to the Stars	Nominated	
2021	42nd Yokohama Film Festival	Best Supporting Actor	Momi's House	Won	
