= Tomohiro Maekawa =

Japanese playwright and theater director (born 1974)

- 前川知大
- Born: 1974; Kashiwazaki, Niigata Prefecture, Japan
- Education: Philosophy Department of Toyo University
- Occupations: Novelist; Playwright; Theater director
- Years active: 2003–present
- Organization(s): Ikiume; Katalushitsu

Tomohiro Maekawa (前川 知大, Maekawa Tomohiro; born 1974) is a Japanese novelist, playwright, and theater director. Maekawa has received numerous accolades throughout his career, including multiple Yomiuri Theater Awards, Yomiuri Literary Awards, two Kinokuniya Theater Award, and the Arts Encouragement Prize for both his plays and his directing.

Maekawa is the founder of the theater companies Ikiume and Katalushitsu. His plays have been translated and performed internationally in cities such as Seoul and Paris. Several of Maekawa's plays have been adapted into films. Most notably, Kiyoshi Kurosawa's 2017 film, Before We Vanish, is based on his play and novel. The film premiered at the 2017 Cannes Film Festival in the Un Certain Regard section.

== Biography ==
Born in Kashiwazaki City, Niigata Prefecture. He graduated from the Philosophy Department of Toyo University in 2000. He established Ikiume in 2003, which depicts otherworldly realms juxtaposed with everyday life through a supernatural worldview. His directing style is characterized by seamless editing of space and time.

In 2007, he published the novel version of Before We Vanish (originally premiered in 2005, currently available in Kadokawa Bunko). In 2008, he received the Yomiuri Theater Award for Excellent Work and Excellent Director for The Front, the Back, and Beyond. In 2009, he won the Kinokuniya Theater Award (Individual Award) and the Arts Encouragement Prize (Newcomer) for Function Domino and Strange Tales from Koizumi Yakumo.

In 2010, he participated in the playwriting program at the Royal Court Theatre in London (International Residency). That year, he won the Tsuruyama Nankoku Playwright Award for The Dance Floor of Plankton. In 2011, he received the 63rd Yomiuri Prize for Drama and Screenplay for The Sun. He won the 19th Yomiuri Theater Award for Best Director and the Grand Prize for both Strange Tales, Part Two and The Sun.

In 2013, he started the experimental theater company Katalushitsu, adapting and directing Dostoevsky's Notes from Underground for their first performance. He received the 21st Yomiuri Theater Award for Excellent Director for Notes from Underground and the Excellent Work Award for Fragments.

In 2017, Before We Vanish was adapted into a film directed by Kiyoshi Kurosawa. It earned two nominations at the 41st Japanese Academy Film Prize. The film had its world premiere in competition at the Un Certain Regard section of the 2017 Cannes Film Festival on 21 May 2017. The film also received an award at the Sitges Film Festival, Official Selection. Foreboding was created as a spin-off of Before We Vanish. It was released in theaters in Japan on 11 November 2017. It was selected to screen in the Panorama section at the 68th Berlin International Film Festival in 2018.

In 2017, he received the 52nd Kinokuniya Theater Award for Group for Ikiume with The Enemy of Heaven and The Invaders Who Take a Walk.

His productions include Tono Monogatari: Strange Tales, Part Three (2016, based on the work of Kunio Yanagita, performed at Setagaya Public Theatre), To Teacher GeGeGe (2018, based on Shigeru Mizuki, performed at Tokyo Metropolitan Theatre), and Endless (2019, based on Homer's Odyssey, also at Setagaya Public Theatre).

In 2016, he had an English reading of The Sun in London (The Studio Theatre, RADA). In 2018, the Paris City Theatre staged a French reading of The Strolling Invader, and Radio France aired a radio drama based on it.

In 2018, a Korean reading performance of The Strolling Invader was directed by Lee Ki-ppeum and performed by Company LAS in Seoul, with a revival at Arco Arts Theatre in 2019 (sponsored by Arts Council Korea). In 2021, The Sun was performed at Doosan Art Center, directed by Kim Jung. Kim Jung-hwa won the Dong-A Theater Award for Newcomer Acting for this performance. In 2023, the same production was revived at the National Cheongdong Theatre. A dance piece titled The Sun (based on Maekawa's work, choreographed by Lee Jae-yong) was performed at Daehakro Arts Theatre.

From around 2021, his translated plays began to be published in various countries, including a French edition of The Invaders Who Take a Walk (published by Espaces34) and a Korean edition (ALMA). The Sun has been published in Spanish (Satrori), Korean (ALMA), English (Methuen Drama, an imprint of Bloomsbury Publishing House), Russian (Hyperion), Arabic (DarAl Maaref), and Chinese (Qingdao Publishing House).

In 2022, he created and directed À la Marge (Paris performance) for Ikiume's first overseas production (with French subtitles), performed at the Maison de la Culture du Japon à Paris, participating in the Festival d'Automne à Paris.

In 2024, he won the 31st Yomiuri Theater Award for Best Work and Excellent Director for Delivering the Soul.

In 2025, he received the 12th Hayakawa "Tragedy Comedy" Award for Strange Tales from Koizumi Yakumo, as well as the Best Director Award and Excellent Work Award at the 32nd Yomiuri Theater Awards.

== Work List ==
=== Script and Direction ===
Referenced by:

- Helicopter Field (ヘリコプター畑) — 2003
- Bossa! World Coordinator (ボッサ！世界担当) — 2003
- Berry Roll by the Window (窓際のベリーロール) — 2004
- A Thoughtful Monster (思慮深いモンスター) — 2004
- Don't Be Shy (はばかるな) — 2005 (Script)
- Short Stories: Library Life vol. 1 (短篇集 図書館的人生vol.1) — 2005
- Twin Fish (双魚) — 2006 (Script)
- PLAYER — 2006
- Incoming Call from Edo!? (江戸から着信!?) — 2007 (Script)
- The Tip of the Smoke (煙の先) — 2007 (Script)
- Union of Rhapsody (狂想のユニオン) — 2007
- The Conference Room with a Hidden Exit (抜け穴の会議室) — 2007, 2010
- Uranus (ウラノス) — 2008 (Script)
- A Friend for Sleep (眠りのともだち) — 2008
- The Front, the Back, and Beyond (表と裏と、その向こう) — 2008
- Library Life vol. 2: Shield and Spear (図書館的人生vol.2 盾と矛) — 2008
- Mutual Love (相思双愛) — 2009 (Script)
- Kikkai: Stories Heard from Lafcadio Hearn (奇ッ怪〜小泉八雲から聞いた話) — 2009
- Enter by the Narrow Gate (狭き門より入れ) — 2009
- Survivors of the Unseen (見えざるモノの生き残り) — 2009
- Library Life Vol. 3: Food Chain (図書館的人生Vol.3 食べもの連鎖) — 2010
- Contemporary Noh Plays VI: Kikkai Part 2 (現代能楽集VI 奇ｯ怪 其ノ弐) — 2011
- Mission (ミッション) — 2012 (Script)
- The Library of Life — 2012
- A Fragment (片鱗) — 2013
- The Engraver of the Sky (空ヲ刻ム者) — 2014
- The Sun 2068 (太陽2068) — 2014 (Script)
- Coming from a Dark Place (暗いところからやってくる) — 2012, 2014 (Script)
- A New Holiday (新しい祝日) — 2014
- Notes from the Underground (地下室の手記) — 2013 two-person play version, 2015 one-person play version
- The Plankton's Landing (プランクトンの踊り場) — 2010, Holy Ground X (聖地X) (retitled in 2015)
- A Room to Tell Stories (語る室) — 2015
- The Sun (太陽) — 2011, 2016
- Tono Monogatari: Kikkai Part 3 (遠野物語・奇ッ怪 其ノ参) — 2016
- Living Time (生きてる時間) — 2017
- Player (プレイヤー) — 2017 (Script)
- Before We Vanish (散歩する侵略者) — 2005, 2007, 2011, 2017
- Library Life Vol. 4: Things That Attack (図書館的人生Vol.4 襲ってくるもの) — 2018
- To Mr. Gegege (ゲゲゲの先生へ) — 2018
- CO.JP — 2018 (Script/Direction collaboration, Script/Direction by Junpei Yasui)
- Pillar of Beasts (獣の柱) — 2013, 2019
- The Endless (終わりのない) — 2019
- Function Dominoes (関数ドミノ) — 2005, 2009, 2014, 2017 (Script), 2022
- Enemy of Heaven (天の敵) — 2017, 2022
- The Outer Road (外の道) — 2021, 2022 (Paris performance titled "À la Marge")
- To Deliver a Soul (人魂を届けに) — 2023
- Useless Resistance (無駄な抵抗) — 2023
- Kikkai: Stories Heard from Lafcadio Hearn (奇ッ怪 小泉八雲から聞いた話) — 2024
- Going Out of Sync (ずれる) — 2025

=== Novel ===
- Before We Vanish (散歩する侵略者) — December 2007, Media Factory; July 2017, Kadokawa Bunko
- The Oni's Head (鬼の頭) — Published in Gunzo, April 2011 issue; included in the Japanese Writers' Association's "Literature 2012", April 2012, Kodansha
- The Mosquito and My Mother's Blood (ヤブ蚊と母の血) — Published in Shosetsu Shincho, August 2014 issue, Shinchosha; included in the Shincho Bunko nex "I Told You Not to Look: Nine Strange Stories," July 2018
- The Sun (太陽) — February 2016, KADOKAWA

=== Illustrated book ===
- Coming from a Dark Place (くらいところからやってくる) — (Art: Kei Kobayashi, Kodansha) Original Work

=== Manga ===
- Livingstone (リヴィングストン) — (Art by Jinsei Kataoka, Kodansha, 2009 - 2015) Original Work

=== Film ===
- The Sun (太陽) — 2016, directed by Yu Irie (Original Story/Script)
- Before We Vanish (散歩する侵略者) — 2017, directed by Kiyoshi Kurosawa (Original Story)
- Foreboding (予兆 散歩する侵略者, Yochō: Sanpo Suru Shinryakusha) — 2017, directed by Kiyoshi Kurosawa (Original Story)
- The Cursed Sanctuary X (聖地X) — 2021, directed by Yu Irie (Original Story)

=== Television Drama ===
- The first drama I created, "The Votive Hair-Plucking Festival of Idea" (奉納イデア毛抜き祭) — October 15, 2010, NHK BShi (Script/Direction)
- The Foreboding: Before We Vanish (予兆 散歩する侵略者) — September 19 - October 17, 2017, WOWOW (Original Story)
- Super Premium "Mario: Where AI is Going" (スーパープレミアム「マリオ〜AIのゆくえ〜」) — October 13, 2018, NHK BS Premium (Script)

=== Radio drama ===
- FM Theater: Before We Vanish March 13, 2010, NHK-FM) - Script.

== Achievements ==
=== Awards ===
Awards received by Maekawa
Award	Year	Category	Work	Result	Ref.
60th Arts Encouragement Prize	2009	Newcomer Award	Function Domino and Strange Tales from Koizumi Yakumo	Won	
12th Hayakawa Awards	2025	"Tragedy Comedy" Award	Strange Tales from Koizumi Yakumo	Won	
44th Kinokuniya Theater Award	2010	Individual Award	Function Domino and Strange Tales from Koizumi Yakumo	Won	
52nd Kinokuniya Theater Award	2017	Group Award	The Enemy of Heaven and The Invaders Who Take a Walk	Won	
14th Tsuruyama Nankoku Playwright Award	2011	Playwright Award	The Dance Floor of Plankton	Won	
63rd Yomiuri Prize	2011	Drama and Screenplay Award	The Sun	Won	
16th Yomiuri Theater Awards	2008	Excellent Work Award	The Front, the Back, and Beyond	Won	
16th Yomiuri Theater Awards	2008	Excellent Director Award	The Front, the Back, and Beyond and Library Life Vol. 2: Shield and Spear	Won	
17th Yomiuri Theater Awards	2009	Excellent Director Award	Function Domino and Enter Through the Narrow Gate	Won	
18th Yomiuri Theater Awards	2010	Excellent Director Award	The Dance Floor of Plankton and Library Life Vol. 3: Food Chain	Won	
19th Yomiuri Theater Awards	2011	Grand Prize and Best Director Award	Strange Tales, Part Two and The Sun	Won	
19th Yomiuri Theater Awards	2011	Excellent Work Award	Strange Tales, Part Two	Won	
21st Yomiuri Theater Awards	2013	Excellent Director Award	Notes from Underground and Fragments	Won	
21st Yomiuri Theater Awards	2013	Excellent Work Award	Fragments	Won	
31st Yomiuri Theater Awards	2023	Excellent Director Award	Delivering the Soul and Futile Resistance	Won	
31st Yomiuri Theater Awards	2023	Best Work Award	Delivering the Soul	Won	
32nd Yomiuri Theater Awards	2024	Excellent Excellent Work Award for Ikiume's	Strange Tales from Koizumi Yakumo	Won	
32nd Yomiuri Theater Awards	2025	Best Director Award	Strange Tales from Koizumi Yakumo	Won	
