= Hibi Rock =

Japanese manga series

- First tankōbon volume cover

日々ロック
- Genre: Musical
- Manga
- Written by: Katsumasa Enokiya
- Published by: Shueisha
- Magazine: Weekly Young Jump
- Original run: June 3, 2010 – February 19, 2015
- Volumes: 6
- Live-action film
- Directed by: Yū Irie
- Studio: Shochiku
- Released: November 22, 2014
- Runtime: 110 minutes
- icon

Hibi Rock (日々ロック; "Daily Rock") is a Japanese manga series written and illustrated by Katsumasa Enokiya. It was serialized in Shueisha's seinen manga magazine Weekly Young Jump from June 2010 to February 2015, with its chapters collected in six tankōbon volumes. A live action film adaptation premiered in November 2014.

== Cast ==
- Shuhei Nomura as Takurō Hibinuma
- Fumi Nikaidō as Saki Utagawa

== Media ==
=== Manga ===
Written and illustrated by Katsumasa Enokiya, Hibi Rock was serialized in Shueisha's seinen manga magazine Weekly Young Jump from June 3, 2010, to February 19, 2015. Shueisha collected its chapters in six tankōbon volumes, released from October 19, 2010, to March 19, 2015.

==== Volumes ====
No.	Japanese release date	Japanese ISBN
1	October 19, 2010	978-4-08-879034-3
2	July 19, 2011	978-4-08-879173-9
3	May 18, 2012	978-4-08-879337-5
4	January 18, 2013	978-4-08-879503-4
5	December 19, 2013	978-4-08-879724-3
6	March 19, 2015	978-4-08-890130-5

=== Live action film ===
A live action film adaptation, directed by Yu Irie, was announced in March 2014. The film was distributed by Shochiku and premiered on November 22, 2014.

== Reception ==
It was nominated for the fifth Manga Taishō, placing 11th out of the 15 nominees, with 32 points.
