= Bialystocks =

Japanese pop duo

- Origin: Japan
- Genre: Pop
- Years active: 2019–present
- Label: Irori
- Members: Sora Hokimoto; Go Kikuchi
- Past members: Hirofumi Shimizu; Taiichiro Mura
- Website: bialystocks.com

Bialystocks (Hepburn: Biarisutokkusu) are a Japanese pop music band formed in 2019, made up of vocalist Sora Hokimoto and keyboardist Go Kikuchi. They are signed to Irori Records, a label under Pony Canyon.

== History ==
=== 2019–2021: Formation and Bialystocks ===
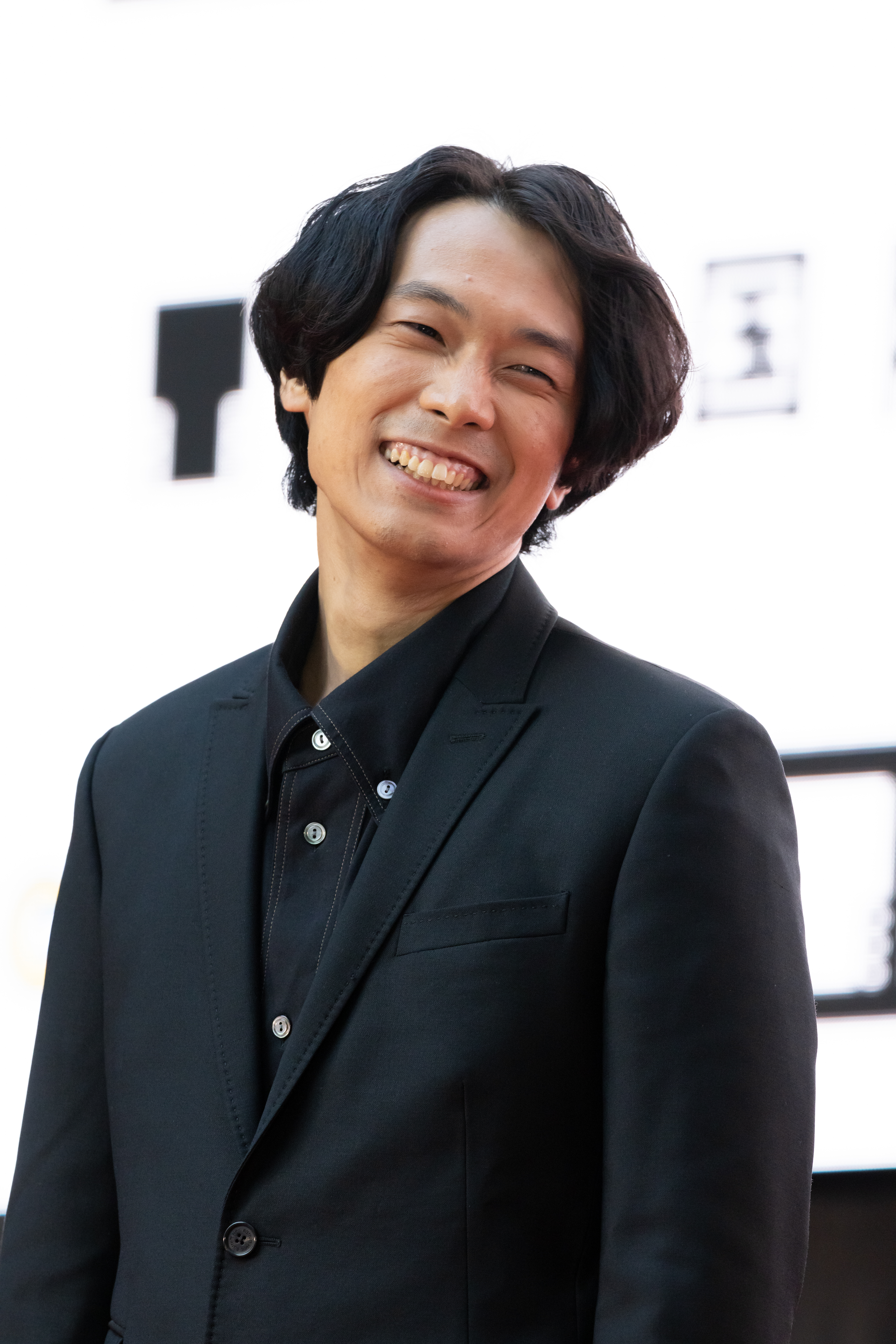
Vocalist Sora Hokimoto at the 2022 Tokyo International Film Festival. Bialystocks were originally formed to perform songs from his feature-length film, Haruneko (2016), at a 2019 event.

Sora Hokimoto, who studied threate and film at the Tama Art University, first met keyboardist Go Kikuchi at a music studio in Kabukichō via the introduction of a mutual friend. According to Hokimoto, this first meeting was "awkward", but he had a casual thought that they could work on something together in the future. In 2016, Hokimoto released his debut feature-length film Haruneko, which also featured him singing in certain scenes. When appearing at an event in 2019, he assembled multiple backing bands to perform the film's songs live. One of these bands consisted of the same musicians who played on the original score, but for another Hokimoto contacted Kikuchi, who assembled a group of musicians. Although they had only assembled to perform songs from the film at this event, they decided to take the opportunity to record a few original songs.

At the time of founding, the band consisted of vocalist Hokimoto, keyboardist Kikuchi, guitarist Hirofumi Shimizu, and drummer Taiichiro Mura. They were named Bialystocks after the main character of The Producers (1967), a black comedy film which Kikuchi has cited as the earliest influence on his creativity. They released their first digital single, "Emptyman", on June 19, 2019, and their self-titled debut album Bialystocks on February 17, 2021. The album's song "I Don't Have a Pen" was later used in web commercials for NTT Docomo.

=== 2022–2024: Quicksand and Songs for the Cryptids ===
After the release of their first album, according to Hokimoto, differing opinions within the band led the other members to depart the group, leaving Bialystocks as a two-man act of himself and Kikuchi. With this line-up, they released their debut EP, Tide Pool, in January 2022. In May, they released their song "Sashiiro", which was written as the ending theme to the television drama Sensei no Otoriyose. Bialystocks also recorded the titular theme song for Hokimoto's second film, Hadaka no Yume, and performed live at its day-one screening. In October, they signed with Irori Records, a label under Pony Canyon, for their first major-label album Quicksand, which was released on November 30, 2022. It reached number 62 on the Billboard Japan Hot Albums chart and was promoted with a three-show tour in 2023, which Natalie reported was sold out.

The band's third album, Songs for the Cryptids was released on October 2, 2024.

=== 2025–present: Fourth album ===
On July 15, 2026, Bialystocks performed to an audience of 10,000 at the Nippon Budokan. On the same day, they announced that their fourth album, still untitled, would be released within the year.

== Artistry ==
Takuto Ueda, writing for Billboard Japan, described the album Quicksand as a "border-crossing" pop record that shows influence from Kikuchi's roots in jazz, as well as elements of soul, folk, rock, ambient, and electronic music. Songs for the Cryptids was also described as a pop album by Mikiki's Mayumi Tsuchida, who wrote that the tracks included soul pop and Beatles-esque rock, and that Hokimoto's voice exhibited the "clarity of gospel" with the "warmth of folk". In a review of the EP Tide Pool for Barks, Koichi Shima, noting both members shared interest in film, wrote about the influence of musicals on their "visual lyrics and sound", such as on the opening tracks "Over Now" and "All Too Soon". In Kikuchi's own opinion, his compositions sometimes borrow elements from American music whilst Hokimoto's vocals serve to provide a more Japanese sound.

== Band members ==
Principal members

- Sora Hokimoto (甫木元 空, Hokimoto Sora) – vocals (2019–present)
- Go Kikuchi (菊池 剛, Kikuchi Gō) – keyboards (2019–present)

Early members

- Hirofumi Shimizu (清水 大史, Shimizu Hirofumi) – guitar (2019–c. 2021)
- Taiichiro Mura (武良 泰一郎, Mura Taiichirō) – drums (2019–c. 2021)

== Discography ==
Studio albums

- Bialystocks (2021)
- Quicksand (2022)
- Songs for the Cryptids (2024)
- Untitled (2026)

== Awards ==
List of awards and nominations
| Award | Year | Category | Recipient | Result | Ref. |
|---|---|---|---|---|---|
| CD Shop Awards | 2023 | Shikoku Regional Award | Quicksand | Won | |
| CD Shop Awards | 2025 | Grand Prix Finalist Award (Blue) | Songs for the Cryptids | Won | |
