= Joker Game =

Japanese novel series and its adaptations

- First novel volume cover

ジョーカー・ゲーム (Jōkā Gēmu)
- Genre: Mystery, political thriller, spy
- Novel series
- Written by: Koji Yanagi
- Published by: Kadokawa Shoten
- Original run: August 28, 2008 – March 25, 2016
- Volumes: 4
- Manga

D no Maō
- Written by: Kayoko Shimotsuki
- Published by: Shogakukan
- Magazine: Weekly Big Comic Spirits (2009); Monthly Big Comic Spirits (2009–2010)
- Original run: January 5, 2009 – May 27, 2010
- Volumes: 3
- Manga
- Written by: Kayoko Shimotsuki
- Published by: Shogakukan
- Magazine: Big Comic Spirits
- Original run: November 14, 2014 – January 19, 2015
- Volumes: 1
- Live-action film
- Directed by: Yu Irie
- Written by: Yūsuke Watanabe
- Music by: Taisei Iwasaki
- Studio: Toho
- Released: January 31, 2015
- Runtime: 107 minutes
- Manga

Joker Game the Animation
- Written by: Subaru Nitō
- Published by: Mag Garden
- Imprint: Blade Comics
- Magazine: Monthly Comic Garden
- Original run: February 5, 2016 – February, 2018
- Volumes: 5
- Anime television series
- Directed by: Kazuya Nomura
- Produced by: Sachi Kawamoto; Kazuo Ōnuki; Hirotsugu Ose; Natsumi Mori; Noritomo Isogai; Keisuke Arai; Shungo Eguchi; Yōko Shiraishi
- Written by: Taku Kishimoto
- Music by: Kenji Kawai
- Studio: Production I.G
- Licensed by: Crunchyroll; UK: Anime Limited
- Original network: AT-X, Tokyo MX, MBS, TV Aichi, BS11
- Original run: April 5, 2016 – June 21, 2016
- Episodes: 12 + 2 OVA
- icon

Joker Game (Japanese: ジョーカー・ゲーム, Hepburn: Jōkā Gēmu) is a Japanese novel series written by Koji Yanagi. It has inspired a live-action film, two manga adaptations and an anime television series produced by Production I.G, which aired from April to June 2016.

== Characters ==
The newly recruited agents in the D-Agency, as depicted in the anime adaptation. From left to right: Odagiri, Fukumoto, Hatano, Kaminaga, Miyoshi, Amari, Tazaki and Jitsui.

Yuuki (結城, Yuuki)
Voiced by: Kenyuu Horiuchi (Japanese); Bill Jenkins (English)
Portrayed by: Yusuke Iseya
Yuuki is the founder of D-Agency, a lieutenant colonel of the Imperial Japanese Army, and a spymaster. As a spy he was named as the "Demon Lord." He is the adopted son of Viscount Arisaki, originally known as Akira Arisaki. He is good at academics, but was expelled from the military school for his cowardly tactics of fighting. This led him to open up the D-Agency, or this is what the information trail he left behind explains, but the spy who uncovers this information finds that it may all be a fabrication taken from another individual altogether.
Sakuma (佐久間, Sakuma)
Voiced by: Tomokazu Seki (Japanese); Christopher Wehkamp (English)
A man from the Imperial Japanese Army, Sakuma was sent to D-Agency to work as a liaison. He is a diligent soldier and is cautious of his surroundings. Although he personally dislikes spies, after the incident in Gordon's house, he has grown to understand them.
Miyoshi (三好, Miyoshi)
Voiced by: Hiro Shimono (Japanese); Jessie James Grelle (English)
Portrayed by: Keisuke Koide
Miyoshi is a narcissist with an arrogant nature. He often talks in a sarcastic tone. Like Kaminaga, he often works overseas. He acts bitter towards Sakuma at first because of his fixed thought about the military, but this soon changes after their first mission together.
Kaminaga (神永, Kaminaga)
Voiced by: Ryōhei Kimura (Japanese); Dave Trosko (English)
Portrayed by: Yukiyoshi Ozawa
At first glance, he gives the atmosphere of a mischievous, happy-go-lucky playboy. He has a lot of pride. Like Miyoshi, he works overseas.
Odagiri (小田切, Odagiri)
Voiced by: Yoshimasa Hosoya (Japanese); David Matranga (English)
Portrayed by: Hiroshi Yamamoto
His real name is Tobisaki Hiroyuki. Graduated from military academy and cadet school, he is unique compared to other members of D-Agency. He was appointed as the second lieutenant. He rarely laughs and is somewhat distant to the other D-Agency members. In most visuals, he is shown to be not very good at handling alcohol.
Amari (甘利, Amari)
Voiced by: Toshiyuki Morikawa (Japanese); Brad Hawkins (English)
One of the oldest along with Kaminaga. A man with a sociable and caring personality, he is like a big brother to the other agency members. He is a very carefree man who is good at handling women.
Hatano (波多野, Hatano)
Voiced by: Yuki Kaji (Japanese); Dallas Reid (English)
While he is said to be charming and proud, he has a cheeky personality. He is a master martial artist and is very agile.
Jitsui (実井, Jitsui)
Voiced by: Jun Fukuyama (Japanese); Joel McDonald (English)
Portrayed by: Kiyohiko Shibukawa
He has a friendly personality, even to Sakuma who was antagonized by most of the members of the agency. He is soft-spoken and caring, but sometimes when he is against a hostile enemy, he shows a sadistic side.
Tazaki (田崎, Tazaki)
Voiced by: Takahiro Sakurai (Japanese); Alejandro Saab (English)
He talks calmly and gives an intellectual atmosphere which makes him sound older than he looks. He has the habit of doing magic when he is thinking. In his conversation card, Amari stated that he can see how stressed Tazaki is from the amount of pigeons flying out from his coat.
Fukumoto (福本, Fukumoto)
Voiced by: Kazuya Nakai (Japanese); Jarod Warren (English)
While he is goofy and quiet in nature, he gets along with Odagiri. He can cook.
Jirou Gamou (蒲生 次郎, Gamou Jirou)
Voiced by: Kenjiro Tsuda (Japanese); Eric Vale (English)
He is a professional at chess and is known as a good man even in missions that require no emotions.

== Media ==
=== Novels ===
The original novel, Joker Game, published by Kadokawa Shoten on August 28, 2008, is a collection of five short stories written by Koji Yanagi. Three of them were published directly in the novel, but two of them—"Joker Game" and "Robinson"—were first published in Kadokawa Shoten mystery magazine Yasei Jidai on its November 2007 and May 2008 issues respectively. The same happened in the following novels; Double Joker, released on August 29, 2009, featured five stories that were previously serialized in Yasei Jidai, an original story—"Black Bird"–and a story that was slated to the magazine October 2009 issue. Paradise Lost, released on March 23, 2012, contained five stories published between Yasei Jidai's July 2011 and March 2012 issues. Released on January 17, 2015, the four stories of Last Waltz had previously been published between Yasei Jidai's September 2014 and January 2015 issues.

| No. | Title | Japanese release date | Japanese ISBN |
|---|---|---|---|
| 1 | Joker Game; Jōkā Gēmu (ジョーカー・ゲーム) | August 28, 2008 (tankōbon); June 23, 2011 (bunkoban) | 978-4-04-873851-4 (tankōbon); ISBN 978-4-04-382906-4 (bunkoban) |
1. "Joker Game" (ジョーカー・ゲーム, Jōkā Gēmu); 2. "Ghost" (幽霊(ゴースト), Gōsuto); 3. "Robinson" (ロビンソン, Robinson); 4. Mato (魔都); 5. "Double Cross" (XX(ダブル・クロス), Daburu Kurosu)
| 2 | Double Joker; Daburu Jōkā (ダブル・ジョーカー) | August 26, 2009 (tankōbon); June 22, 2012 (bunkoban) | 978-4-04-873960-3 (tankōbon); ISBN 978-4-04-100328-2 (bunkoban) |
1. Daburu Jōkā (ダブル・ジョーカー); 2. Hae no Ō (蠅の王); 3. Butsuin Sakusen (仏印作戦); 4. Hitsugi (柩); 5. "Black Bird" (ブラックバード, Burakku Bādo); 6. Nemuru Otoko (眠る男)
| 3 | Paradise Lost; Paradaisu Rosuto (パラダイス・ロスト) | March 23, 2012 (tankōbon); June 21, 2013 (bunkoban) | 978-4-04-110138-4 (tankōbon); ISBN 978-4-04-100826-3 (bunkoban) |
1. Gosan (誤算); 2. "Paradise Lost" (失楽園(パラダイス・ロスト), Paradaisu Rosuto); 3. Tsuiseki (追跡); 4. Angō-mei: Keruberosu (Zenpen) (暗号名ケルベロス(前編)); 5. Angō-mei: Keruberosu (Kōhen) (暗号名ケルベロス(後編))
| 4 | Last Waltz; Rasuto Warutsu (ラスト・ワルツ) | January 17, 2015 (tankōbon); March 25, 2016 (bunkoban) | 978-4-04-102137-8 (tankōbon); ISBN 978-4-04-104023-2 (bunkoban) |
1. "Asia Express" (アジア・エクスプレス, Ajia Ekusupuresu); 2. Budōkai no Yoru (舞踏会の夜); 3. "Valkyrie: Part 1" (ワルキューレ(前編), Warukyūre (Zenpen)); 4. "Valkyrie: Part 2" (ワルキューレ(後編), Warukyūre (Kōhen))

=== Manga ===
Kayoko Shimotsuki wrote two manga adaptations of the series. The first, D no Maō (Dの魔王), adapts the first novel and debuted in Shogakukan's seinen manga magazine Weekly Big Comic Spirits on January 5, 2009. The manga was later transferred to Monthly Big Comic Spirits, where it was serialized from August 27, 2009, to May 27, 2010. Shogakukan collected its chapters in three tankōbon volumes, released from August 28, 2009, to July 30, 2010. The second manga, adapting the film, was simply titled Joker Game and serialized in Big Comic Spirits between November 17, 2014, and January 19, 2015, the same day its sole tankōbon was published.

A manga by Subaru Nitō adapting the anime was announced in the February 2016 issue of Mag Garden's Comic Garden magazine. It began its serialization in the March 2016 issue of Mag Garden's Comic Garden Magazine on February 5, 2016, which contained the first two chapters of the manga. The manga titled Joker Game the Animation has been collected into five volumes released on May 10, 2016, and March 10, 2018.

==== Volumes ====
| No. | Japanese release date | Japanese ISBN |
|---|---|---|
| 1 | May 10, 2016 | 978-4-8000-0572-4 |
1. Jōkā Gēmu (Zenpen) (ジョーカー・ゲーム(前編)); 2. Jōkā gēmu (Chūhen) (ジョーカー・ゲーム(中編)); 3. Jōkā Gēmu (Kōhen) (ジョーカー・ゲーム(後編)); 4. Gosan (Zenpen) (誤算 (前編)); 5. Gosan (Kōhen) (誤算 (後編))
| 2 | October 8, 2016 | 978-4-8000-0621-9 |
6. Mato (Zenpen) (魔都 (前編)); 7. Mato (Kōhen) (魔都 (前編)); 8. Robinson (Zenpen) (ロビンソン(前編)); 9. Robinson (Kōhen) (ロビンソン(後編))
| 3 | April 10, 2017 | 978-4-80-000675-2 |
10. Ajia Ekusupuresu (アジア・エクスプレス（前編）)
| 4 | October 10, 2017 | 978-4-80-000721-6 |
| 5 | March 10, 2018 | 978-4-80-000751-3 |

=== Film ===
A live-action action suspense film directed by Yu Irie based on the novel was released on January 31, 2015. Starring Kazuya Kamenashi, Yūsuke Iseya and Kyoko Fukada, it was filmed during April 2014 in Singapore and in Batam, Indonesia. Irie described it as an international production since it featured British and Australian actors and only 20% of the crew was composed of Japanese people. The film's budget was partially financed by Nippon Television and it was distributed by Toho. The film earned ¥271 million on its opening weekend in Japan, closing its run with ¥960 million grossed. It received 225 votes (out of 677) and won the Fan Grand Prize of the Nikkan Sports Film Award. Its North American premiere was held during the Japan Cuts festival on July 9, 2015.

=== Anime ===
An anime television series was announced in the September issue of Kadokawa's Newtype magazine. The 12-episode series was produced by Production I.G, directed by Kazuya Nomura and written by Taku Kishimoto. Shirow Miwa provided the series' character designs and Kenji Kawai composed the music. The anime began airing on April 5, 2016, on AT-X, Tokyo MX, MBS, TV Aichi and BS11, finishing on June 21, 2016. The two Blu-ray disc released on July 27, 2016, and September 28, 2016, respectively, contained an original video animation each, titled Kuroneko Yoru no Bōken. QUADRANGLE performed the anime's opening theme, titled "Reason Triangle", and MAGIC OF LiFE performed the anime's ending theme, titled "Double." The anime is licensed in North America by Funimation and simulcast through the streaming website Crunchyroll.

==== Episodes ====
| No. | Title | Directed by | Original release date |
|---|---|---|---|
| 1 | "Joker Game (Part 1)"; Transliteration: "Jōkā Gēmu (Zenpen)" (Japanese: ジョーカー・ゲーム（前編）) | Kazuya Nomura | April 5, 2016 |
The story is set in autumn 1937; with strong objection from the Imperial Army, Lieutenant Colonel Yuki establishes the D-Agency, which trains spies for insertion into other countries. General headquarters' colonel Muto nominates first lieutenant Sakuma to monitor the D-Agency, and orders the agency to investigate John Gordon, who is suspected to be an American spy. Disguised as military police, the training spies and Sakuma search the home of Gordon for evidence proving that he is in fact a spy. Sakuma's life is used as a pawn by one of the other spies when his committing seppuku is used as a bargaining tool to get inside of Gordon's home. However, it seems clear that actually Sakuma is being played by his superior and the other spies and there is no evidence linking Gordon to being a spy.
| 2 | "Joker Game (Part 2)"; Transliteration: "Jōkā Gēmu (Kōhen)" (Japanese: ジョーカー・ゲーム（後編）) | Alan Smithee | April 12, 2016 |
When he is preparing to commit seppuku, Sakuma remembers Yuki's definition of what constitutes the work spy—to be invisible—and infers the evidence they are looking for is behind the emperor's portrayal. They succeed on their mission but Sakuma is intrigued when Gordon says this was the second time the military police went there. Sakuma then realizes that this plot was contrived by Muto to fail so as to hide his own failure investigating Gordon. Sakuma also realizes that Yuki discovered Muto's plan and used this event to blackmail him to collaborate with D-Agency, hoping to receive more funds from the Army.
| 3 | "Miscalculation"; Transliteration: "Gosan" (Japanese: 誤算) | Takeshi Ninomiya | April 19, 2016 |
A man, whose passport has the name "Shimano Ryousuke", wakes up with amnesia in Marseille, France. He is in a house with Alain, Jean, and Marie, three members of French resistance to German occupation. When German soldiers surround the house, "Shimano" fixes their only gun and gives it to Marie. He also prepares a dust explosion that gives them time to escape. The group stop to decide whether "Shimano" can join the resistance and then Marie reveals she is a German collaborator since her family was made hostage by the Germans. Shimano tries to disarm her, but is knocked out by Jean, who is moved by his love. When Shimano wakes up, he remembers he is D-Agency's Hatano, whose mission was to infiltrate Alain's group. Hatano meets Yuki and is informed he can return to Japan, and deduces Japan will align with Germany.
| 4 | "City of Temptation"; Transliteration: "Mato" (Japanese: 魔都) | Hideki Hosokawa | April 26, 2016 |
After Captain Oikawa assigns Sergeant Honma to discover a supposed spy within the Shanghai Military Police, Oikawa's home is bombed, as was a Japanese business a few days ago. At the crime scene, Honma meets Shiozuka, whom he had once investigated for his affiliation with an anti-Japanese magazine. Shiozuka tells Honma he saw there the magazine's ringleader, Kusanagi, who may be involved on it because of his anti-Japanese feeling. Honma follows Kusanagi to a casino, where Honma solves the mystery; in fact, Oikawa himself bombed his home to cover his opium traffic. When a corporal, Miyata, discovered this, Oikawa paid a boy he met in the casino to kill him. Then the exploded the building to kill the boy. A private, Yoshino, kills Oikawa, revenging the death of the boy he loved. In the end, Shiozuka is revealed to be D-Agency's Fukumoto.
| 5 | "Robinson"; Transliteration: "Robinson" (Japanese: ロビンソン) | Kazuchika Kise | May 3, 2016 |
During an undercover assignment as a photographer in London, D-Agency's Kaminaga is captured and interrogated by Howard Marks, a spymaster for British Intelligence Secret Service. Even after being injected with truth serum and told that he had been set up by a diplomat, Kaminaga makes a deal with Marks to send a telegram with Japanese keying styles. Kaminaga manages to escape captivity with the help of a sleeper agent within Marks' organization. By receiving Marks' intel in verbatim rather than with errors, D-Agency learns about Kaminaga's situation and ensures his escape. It is revealed that Lieutenant Yuuki contrived the entire situation in order to discover the diplomat's leak.
| 6 | "Asia Express"; Transliteration: "Ajia Ekusupuresu" (Japanese: アジア・エクスプレス) | Yūsuke Sunouchi | May 10, 2016 |
After planning to leak top-secret information from the Soviet Union to Japan printed within a newspaper message, Anton Morozoff is assassinated aboard the Asia Express. His contact, D-Agency's Tazaki, enlists the help of three boys to identify the killer before he escapes the train at Mukden with the intel. It is revealed that the conductor was the assassin and that he was in cahoots with Morozoff's lover, Elena, who did not want to flee to America with him. Rather than turning her over to SMERSH, Tazaki recruits Elena to be a spy for Japan.
| 7 | "Code Name: Cerberus"; Transliteration: "Kōdonēmu: Keruberosu" (Japanese: 暗号名ケルベロス) | Kōji Komurakata | May 17, 2016 |
Amari's story, set aboard a ship bound for Honolulu, Hawaiian Islands.
| 8 | "Double Joker (Part 1)"; Transliteration: "Daburu Jōkā (Zenpen)" (Japanese: ダブル・ジョーカー（前編）) | Daiki Mori | May 24, 2016 |
First half of Gamou's story, set in Japan.
| 9 | "Double Joker (Part 2)"; Transliteration: "Daburu Jōkā (Kōhen)" (Japanese: ダブル・ジョーカー（後編）) | Takeshi Ninomiya; Daiki Mori | May 31, 2016 |
Second half of Gamou's story, also revealing Jitsui's involvement.
| 10 | "Pursuit"; Transliteration: "Tsuiseki" (Japanese: 追跡) | Takeshi Ninomiya | June 7, 2016 |
Episode 10 features an attempted investigation into Yuuki's past by Aaron Price, a journalist for the British Times newspaper.
| 11 | "Coffin"; Transliteration: "Hitsugi" (Japanese: 柩) | Yoshimi Itazu | June 14, 2016 |
The main part of the episode features Miyoshi's story, set in Germany, whilst also delving a little deeper into Yuuki's past.
| 12 | "Double Cross"; Transliteration: "Daburu Kurosu" (Japanese: ダブル・クロス) | Kazuya Nomura | June 21, 2016 |
The series draws to its close with Odagiri's story, set in Japan.
| OVA–1 | "Adventure of Black Cat Yoru: Part 1"; Transliteration: "Kuroneko Yoru no Bōken Zenpen" (Japanese: 黒猫ヨルの冒険 前編) | Hideki Hosokawa | July 27, 2016 |
| OVA–2 | "Adventure of Black Cat Yoru: Part 2"; Transliteration: "Kuroneko Yoru no Bōken Kōhen" (Japanese: 黒猫ヨルの冒険 後編) | Hideki Hosokawa | September 28, 2016 |

== Reception ==
In 2008, Joker Game ranked second on Kono Mystery ga Sugoi! and third on Shūkan Bunshun Mystery Best 10. In 2009, Joker Game won the Yoshikawa Eiji Prize for New Writers and the Mystery Writers of Japan Award for Best Novel. The anime won the special Nogizaka46 Award given by the Newtype magazine.
