= Yu Irie =

Japanese film director / screenwriter (born 1979)

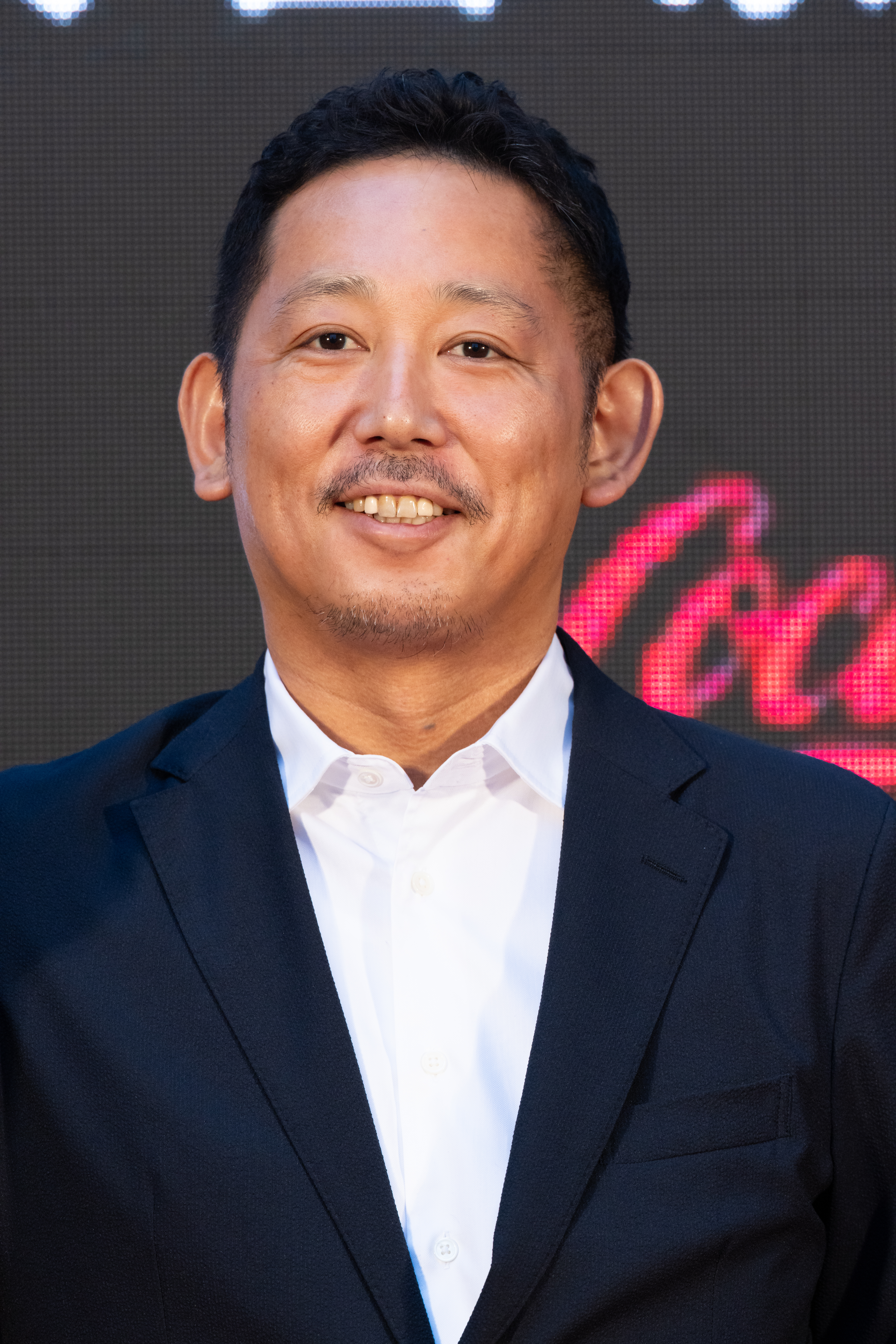
- Irie at the 37th Tokyo International Film Festival in 2024
- Born: November 25, 1979 (age 46); Yokohama, Kanagawa, Japan
- Occupation: Film director

Yu Irie (入江 悠, Irie Yū; born November 25, 1979) is a Japanese film director / screenwriter who was born in Yokohama, Kanagawa Prefecture, and grew up in Fukaya, Saitama Prefecture.

After a number of short films, including Obsession and Seven Drives which were screened at the Yubari International Fantastic Film Festival in 2003 and 2004, Irie directed two softcore erotic V-Cinema videos in 2007, Cream Lemon 7 and Swimsuit Spy - SPY GIRLS. The latter video, an erotic comedy, starred AV Idol Mihiro.

In 2009 the second feature film he directed, 8000 Miles (SR サイタマノラッパー, SR: Saitama no Rapper), won the grand prize in the Off Theatre Competition at the Yubari International Fantastic Film Festival. It also earned Irie the Directors Guild of Japan New Directors Award. The film follows four friends from suburban Fukuya (punned on Fukaya) who dream of becoming rap stars. The mostly amateur cast also included adult video actress Mihiro.

== Filmography ==
=== Feature films ===
- Japonica Virus (2006)
- 8000 Miles (2009)
- 8000 Miles 2: Girl Rappers (2010)
- Roadside Fugitive (2012)
- Hibi Rock (2014)
- Joker Game (2015)
- The Sun (2016)
- Confession of Murder (2017)
- Vigilante (2017)
- Gangoose (2018)
- AI Amok (2020)
- Ninja Girl (2021)
- The Cursed Sanctuary X (2021)
- Nemesis: The Mystery of the Golden Spiral (2023)
- A Girl Named Ann (2024)
- Muromachi Outsiders (2025)

=== V-Cinema ===
- Cream Lemon 7 (くりいむレモン 魔人形（マ・ドール）, Kuriimu Remon Ma Ningyō (Ma Dōru)) (2007)
- Swimsuit Spy - SPY GIRLS (水着スパイ ～SPY GIRLS～, Mizugi Supai - SPY GIRLS) (2007)

=== Television ===
- Nemesis (2021)
- Uzukawamura Jiken (2022)
