= 8000 Miles =

- Film poster
- Directed by: Yu Irie
- Written by: Yu Irie
- Starring: Eita Okuno; Hikohiko Sugiyama; Mihiro
- Cinematography: Kazuhiro Mimura
- Music by: Taisei Iwasaki
- Production company: Norainu Film
- Release date: March 14, 2009 (Japan)
- Running time: 80 minutes
- Country: Japan
- Language: Japanese

8000 Miles (Japanese: SRサイタマノラッパー, Hepburn: SR Saitama no Rappa) is a Japanese film directed by Yu Irie. It was released on March 14, 2009.

== Cast ==
- Eita Okuno
- Hikohiko Sugiyama
- Mihiro
- Ryusuke Komakine
- Shingo Mizusawa
- Tatsuya Masunari

== Reception ==
It won the Grand Prize at the 2009 Yubari International Fantastic Film Festival. Tom Mes of Midnight Eye wrote that "Irie has a great eye for landscape, colour and composition, filming most of his scenes in single takes with barely any close-ups, cutaways or reaction shots."
