= Memoirs of a Murderer (film) =

- Film poster
- Kanji: 22年目の告白－私が殺人犯です－
- Directed by: Yū Irie
- Written by: Byung-gil Jung; Kenya Hirata; Jung Byung-gil
- Screenplay by: Yū Irie; Tetsuya Oishi
- Produced by: Naoaki Kitajima; Masaki Koide
- Starring: Tatsuya Fujiwara; Hideaki Itō
- Cinematography: Takahiro Imai
- Edited by: Emi Tsujita
- Music by: Masaru Yokoyama
- Production companies: Nippon TV; Robot Communications; Warner Bros. Pictures Japan; WOWOW; Horipro; Yomiuri Telecasting Corporation; Dentsu; KDDI Corporation; East Japan Marketing & Communications; D.N. Dream Partners; Kodansha; A-Team Inc.; GyaO; Sapporo Television Broadcasting; Miyagi Television Broadcasting; Shizuoka Daiichi Television; Chūkyō Television Broadcasting; Hiroshima Telecasting; Fukuoka Broadcasting Corporation
- Distributed by: Warner Bros. Pictures Japan
- Release date: June 10, 2017 (Japan)
- Running time: 118 minutes
- Country: Japan
- Language: Japanese
- Box office: $20.21 million

Memoirs of a Murderer (Japanese: 22年目の告白－私が殺人犯です－, Hepburn: 22 nenme no Kokuhaku: Watashi ga Satsujinhan desu), also known as Confession of Murder, is a 2017 Japanese detective thriller film that is a remake of the 2012 South Korean film Confession of Murder. The film was directed by Yū Irie and stars Tatsuya Fujiwara as Sonezaki and Hideaki Itō as Ko Makimura.

== Plot ==
In 1995, five mysterious murders took place. In 2017, a man named Masato Sonezaki comes public confessing that he is the murderer, but the police cannot arrest him due to a loophole in the law. Sonezaki publishes a book and becomes a celebrity. Later, another man claims to be the real murderer. But then it is revealed that both of them are frauds. Sonezaki confesses that he wanted to capture the real killer while the other man wanted financial success. Sonezaki is revealed to be Takumi Onodera, whose fiancé was killed by that killer. Later, Sonezaki finds out the real killer's hideout and tries to kill him. Detective Kō Makimura comes and stops Sonezaki. The killer is then taken to police custody.

In a post-credit scene, a man attempts to kill the killer to avenge his mother.

== Cast ==
- Tatsuya Fujiwara as Masato Sonezaki, who claims himself to be the murderer.
- Hideaki Itō as Kō Makimura, a detective.
- Kaho as Miharu Kishi
- Shuhei Nomura
- Anna Ishibashi
- Ryo Ryusei
- Taichi Saotome
- Mitsuru Hirata
- Koichi Iwaki
- Toru Nakamura
- Ryo Iwamatsu
