= 74th Berlin International Film Festival =

2024 film festival in Berlin, Germany

- Official festival poster
- Opening film: Small Things Like These
- Closing film: Dahomey
- Location: Berlin, Germany
- Founded: 1951
- Awards: Golden Bear: Dahomey
- Artistic director: Carlo Chatrian
- Festival date: Opening: 15 February 2024; Closing: 25 February 2024
- Website: www.berlinale.de

Berlin International Film Festival
- 75th 73rd

The 74th annual Berlin International Film Festival, usually called the Berlinale, took place between 15 and 25 February 2024 in Berlin, Germany. Kenyan-Mexican actress Lupita Nyong'o was named the Jury President for the main competition. This year's Berlinale was Carlo Chatrian and Mariette Rissenbeek's final edition in charge, following their dismissal in 2023. The festival opened with Tim Mielants' Small Things Like These.

Dahomey, directed by French-Senegalese filmmaker Mati Diop, won the Golden Bear, making it the second year in a row that a documentary won the festival's top prize, following On the Adamant's win in 2023. The Silver Bear Grand Jury Prize was awarded to A Traveler's Needs by Hong Sang-soo, and the Silver Bear for Best Leading Performance was awarded to Sebastian Stan for A Different Man. American filmmaker Martin Scorsese was awarded with the Honorary Golden Bear.

== Juries ==
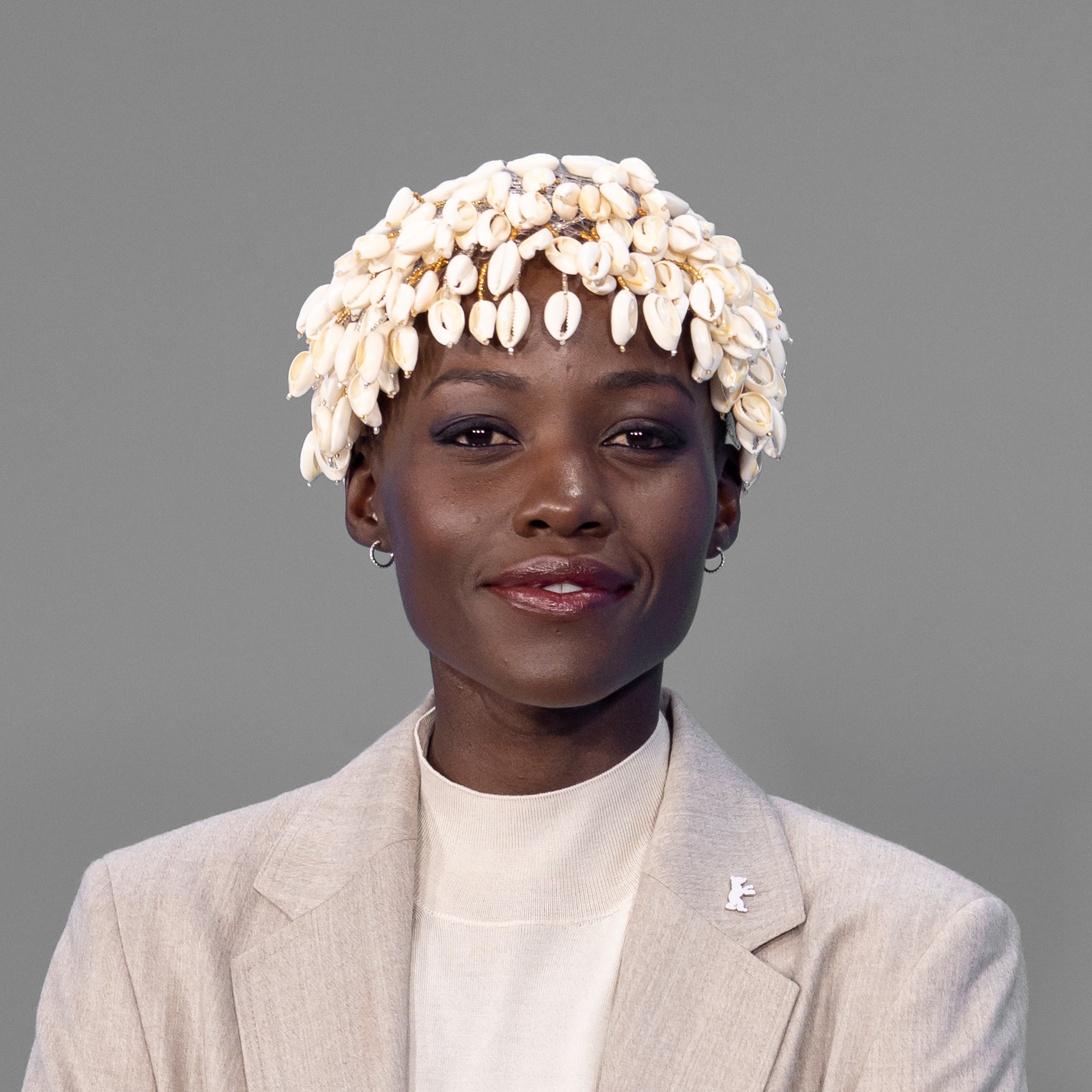
Lupita Nyong'o, Jury President for the Main Competition

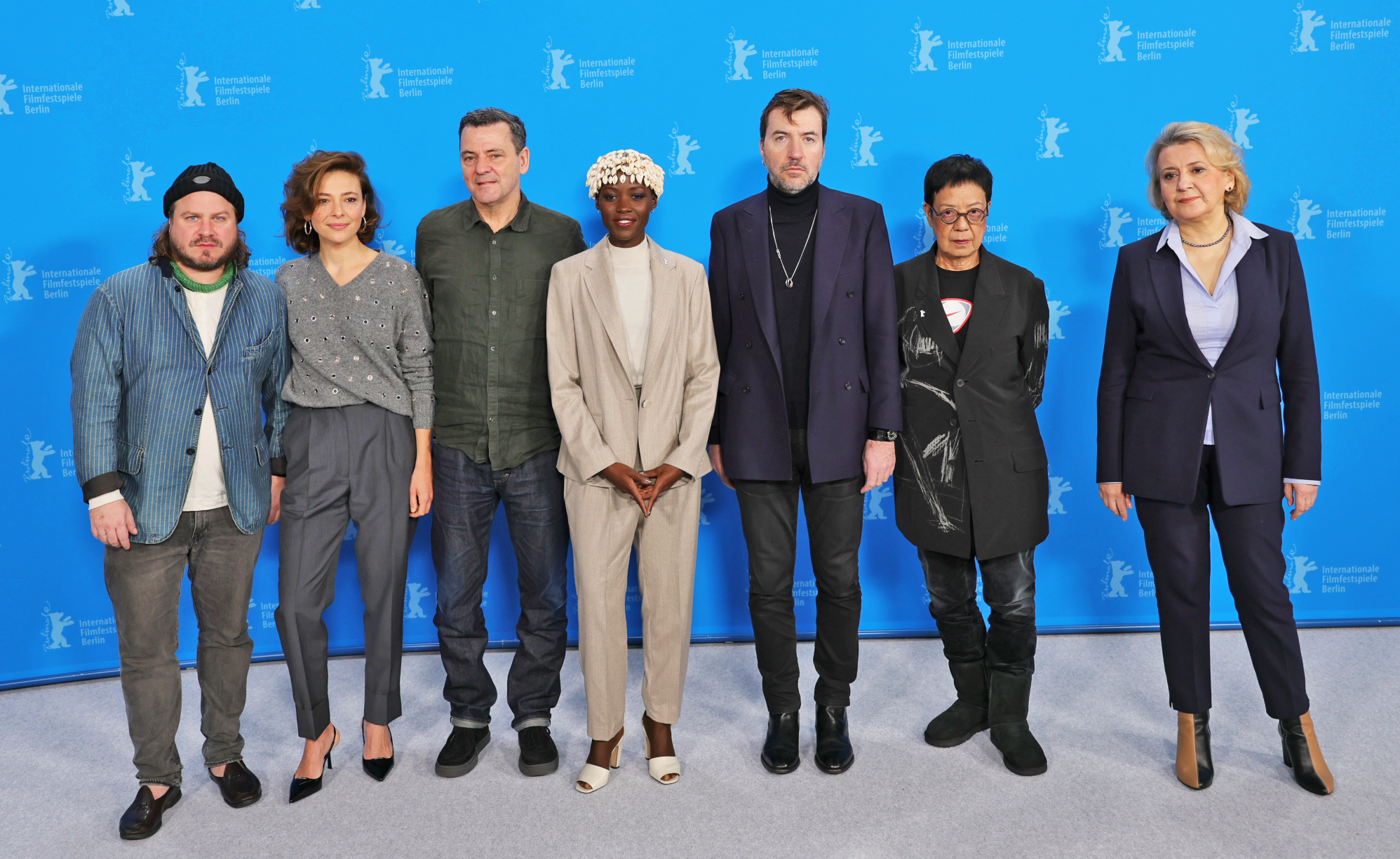
Main Competition International Jury Members

=== International Jury – Main Competition ===
- Lupita Nyong'o, Kenyan-Mexican actress – Jury President
- Brady Corbet, American filmmaker and actor
- Ann Hui, Hong Kong-Chinese filmmaker and actress
- Christian Petzold, German filmmaker
- Jasmine Trinca, Italian actress and filmmaker
- Albert Serra, Spanish filmmaker
- Oksana Zabuzhko, Ukrainian novelist and poet

=== Encounters Jury ===
- Lisandro Alonso, Argentine filmmaker
- Denis Côté, Canadian filmmaker
- Tizza Covi, Italian filmmaker

=== International Jury – Short Film Competition ===
- İlker Çatak, German filmmaker
- Xabier Erkizia, Spanish sound artist and researcher
- Jennifer Reeder, American filmmaker, video artist and lecturer

=== Generation Jury ===
- Amjad Abu Alala, Sudanese filmmaker
- Banafshe Hourmazdi, Iranian-German actress
- Ira Sachs, American filmmaker

=== GWFF Best First Feature Award Jury ===
- Eliza Hittman, American filmmaker
- Andréa Picard, Canadian Senior Film curator at the Toronto International Film Festival and advisor to the Marrakech International Film Festival
- Katrin Pors, Danish producer

=== Berlinale Documentary Award and Jury ===
- Abbas Fahdel, Iraqi filmmaker
- Thomas Heise, German filmmaker
- Véréna Paravel, French artist, and anthropologist

== Official Sections ==
=== Main Competition ===
The following films were selected for the main competition for the Golden Bear:

English Title	Original Title	Director(s)	Production Country
Another End		Piero Messina	Italy, France, United Kingdom
Architecton		Victor Kossakovsky	Germany, France, United States
Black Tea		Abderrahmane Sissako	France, Mauritania, Taiwan, Luxembourg, Ivory Coast
La cocina		Alonso Ruizpalacios	Mexico, United States
Dahomey		Mati Diop	Benin, France, Senegal
The Devil's Bath	Des Teufels Bad	Veronika Franz and Severin Fiala	Austria, Germany
A Different Man		Aaron Schimberg	United States
Dying	Sterben	Matthias Glasner	Germany
The Empire	L'Empire	Bruno Dumont	France, Italy, Germany, Belgium, Portugal
From Hilde, with Love	In Liebe, Eure Hilde	Andreas Dresen	Germany
Gloria!		Margherita Vicario	Italy, Switzerland
Langue étrangère	Fremdsprache	Claire Burger	France, Germany, Belgium
My Favourite Cake	کیک محبوب من	Behtash Sanaeeha and Maryam Moqadam	Iran, France, Sweden, Germany
Pepe		Nelson Carlo De Los Santos Arias	Dominican Republic, Namibia, Germany, France
Shambhala		Min Bahadur Bham	Nepal, France, Norway, Hong Kong, China, Turkey, United States, Qatar, Taiwan
Small Things Like These (opening film)		Tim Mielants	Ireland, Belgium
Sons	Vogter	Gustav Möller	Denmark, Sweden
Suspended Time	Hors du temps	Olivier Assayas	France, Germany
A Traveler's Needs	여행자의 필요	Hong Sang-soo	South Korea
Who Do I Belong To	ماء العين	Meryam Joobeur	Tunisia, France, Canada, Norway, Qatar, Saudi Arabia

=== Berlinale Special ===
The following films are selected for the Berlinale Special section:

English Title	Original Title	Director(s)	Production Country
Berlinale Special Gala
Cuckoo		Tilman Singer	Germany
Love Lies Bleeding		Rose Glass	United States, United Kingdom
The Roundup: Punishment	범죄도시4	Heo Myeong-haeng	South Korea
Seven Veils		Atom Egoyan	Canada
Spaceman		Johan Renck	United States
The Strangers’ Case		Brandt Andersen	Jordan
Treasure		Julia von Heinz	Germany, France
Berlinale Special
Abiding Nowhere	無所住	Tsai Ming-liang	Taiwan, United States
At Averroès & Rosa Parks	Averroès & Rosa Parks	Nicolas Philibert	France
August My Heaven	オーガスト・マイ・ヘヴン	Riho Kudo	Japan
The Box Man	箱男	Gakuryu Ishii	Japan
Chime	チャイム	Kiyoshi Kurosawa	Japan
Dostoyevsky (6 episodes)	Dostoevskij	Damiano and Fabio D’Innocenzo	Italy
Eleven Tomorrows: Berlinale Meets Football	Elf Mal Morgen: Berlinale Meets Fußball	Maximilian Bungarten, Anna-Maria Dutoit, Kilian Armando Friedrich, Indira Geisel, Eva Gemmer, Felix Herrmann, Hannah Jandl, Justina Jürgensen, Hilarija Ločmele, Daniela Magnani-Hüller, Sophie Mühe, Camille Tricaud, Marie Zrenner	Germany
The Empty Grave	Das leere Grab	Agnes Lisa Wegner, Cece Mlay	Germany, Tanzania
exergue – on documenta 14		Dimitris Athiridis	Greece
Filmstunde_23		Edgar Reitz, Jörg Adolph	Germany
Made in England: The Films of Powell and Pressburger		David Hinton	United Kingdom
Sasquatch Sunset		David Zellner and Nathan Zellner	United States
Shikun		Amos Gitai	Israel, France, Switzerland, Brazil, United Kingdom
Supersex (episodes 1–3)		Matteo Rovere, Francesco Carrozzini, Francesca Mazzoleni	Italy
Turn in the Wound		Abel Ferrara	United Kingdom, Germany, Italy, United States

=== Encounters ===
The following films are selected for the Encounters section:

English Title	Original Title	Director(s)	Production Country
Arcadia		Yorgos Zois	Greece, Bulgaria, United States
Cidade; Campo		Juliana Rojas	Brazil, Germany, France
Demba		Mamadou Dia	Senegal, Germany
Direct Action		Guillaume Cailleau and Ben Russell	Germany, France
Sleep With Your Eyes Open	Dormir de Olhos Abertos	Nele Wohlatz	Brazil, Argentina, Taiwan, Germany
The Fable		Raam Reddy	India, United States
A Family	Une Famille	Christine Angot	France
Favoriten		Ruth Beckermann	Austria
Ivo		Eva Trobisch	Germany
The Great Yawn of History	Khamyazeye bozorg	Aliyar Rasti	Iran
Some Rain Must Fall	空房间里的女人	Qiu Yang	China, United States, France, Singapore
Hands in the Fire	Mãos no Fogo	Margarida Gil	Portugal
Matt and Mara		Kazik Radwanski	Canada
Through the Graves the Wind Is Blowing		Travis Wilkerson	United States
You Burn Me	Tú me Abrasas	Matías Piñeiro	Argentina, Spain

=== Berlinale Short Film Competition ===
The following films are selected for the Berlinale's Short Film Competition section:

English Title	Original Title	Director(s)	Production Country
Baldilocks	Kaalkapje	Marthe Peters	Belgium
Bye-Bye, Turtle	Adieu tortue	Selin Öksüzoğlu	France
Circle	서클	Joung Yumi	South Korea
City Museum / My Paradise	Stadtmuseum / Moi Rai	Boris Dewjatkin	Germany
City of Poets		Sara Rajaei	Netherlands
Goodbye First Love	经过	Shuli Huang	United States
Kawauso	カワウソ	Akihito Izuhara	Japan
Lick a Wound	Les animaux vont mieux	Nathan Ghali	France
The Moon Also Rises	月亮照常升起	Yuyan Wang	France
An Odd Turn	Un movimiento extraño	Francisco Lezama	Argentina
Pacific Vein		Ulu Braun	Germany
Preoperational Model		Philip Ullman	Netherlands
Remains of the Hot Day	热天午后	Wenqian Zhang	China
Sojourn to Shangri-La	是日访古	Lin Yihan	China
Tako Tsubo		Fanny Sorgo, Eva Pedroza	Austria, Germany
That's All From Me	So viel von mir	Eva Könnemann	Germany
Towards the Sun, Far From the Center	Al sol, lejos del centro	Luciana Merino, Pascal Viveros	Chile
Unwanted Kinship	Ungewollte Verwandtschaft	Pavel Mozhar	Germany
Wandering Bird	Oiseau de passage	Victor Dupuis	Belgium
We Will Not Be the Last of Our Kind		Mili Pecherer	France

=== Panorama ===
The following films are selected for the Panorama section:

English Title	Original Title	Director(s)	Production Country
Afterwar		Birgitte Stærmose	Denmark, Kosovo, Sweden, Finland
All Shall Be Well	從今以後	Ray Yeung	Hong Kong
Andrea Gets a Divorce	Andrea lässt sich scheiden	Josef Hader	Austria
Baldiga – Unlocked Heart	Baldiga – Entsichertes Herz	Markus Stein	Germany
Betânia		Marcelo Botta	Brazil
Between the Temples		Nathan Silver	United States
A Bit of a Stranger	Трішки чужа	Svitlana Lishchynska	Ukraine
Brief History of a Family	家庭简史	Lin Jianjie	China, Denmark
Crossing		Levan Akin	Sweden, Denmark, France, Turkey, Georgia
Cu Li Never Cries	Cu Li Không Bao Giờ Khóc	Lân Phạm Ngọc	Vietnam, Philippines, France, Singapore, Norway
Diaries from Lebanon		Myriam El Hajj	Lebanon, France, Qatar, Saudi Arabia
Every You Every Me	Alle die Du bist	Michael Fetter Nathansky	Germany, Spain
Faruk		Aslı Özge	Germany, France, Turkey
I'm Not Everything I Want to Be	Ještě nejsem, kým chci být	Klára Tasovská	Austria, Czechia, Slovakia
I Saw the TV Glow		Jane Schoenbrun	United States
I Saw Three Black Lights	Yo vi tres luces negrasi	Santiago Lozano Álvarez	Colombia, France, Germany, Mexico
Janet Planet		Annie Baker	United States
Meanwhile on Earth	Pendant ce temps sur Terre	Jérémy Clapin	France
Memories of a Burning Body	Memorias de un cuerpo que arde	Antonella Sudasassi Furniss	Costa Rica, Spain
My New Friends	Les gens d’à côté	André Téchiné	France
My Stolen Planet	Sayyareye dozdide shodeye man	Farahnaz Sharifi	Germany, Iran
No Other Land		Basel Adra, Hamdan Ballal, Yuval Abraham, Rachel Szor	Palestine, Norway
The Outrun		Nora Fingscheidt	Germany, United Kingdom
Paradises of Diane	Les Paradis de Diane	Carmen Jaquier and Jan Gassmann	Switzerland
Rising Up at Night	Tongo Saa	Nelson Makengo	Democratic Republic of the Congo, Belgium, Germany, Burkina Faso, Qatar
Scorched Earth	Verbrannte Erde	Thomas Arslan	Germany
Sex		Dag Johan Haugerud	Norway
Teaches of Peaches		Philipp Fussenegger, Judy Landkammer	Germany
The Visitor		Bruce LaBruce	United Kingdom
Which Way Africa?	À quand l'Afrique?	David-Pierre Fila	Republic of the Congo, Angola, Cameroon
Zeit Verbrechen (episodes 1–4)		Mariko Minoguchi, Jan Bonny, Helene Hegemann, Faraz Shariat	Germany

=== Forum ===
The following films are selected for the Forum section:

English Title	Original Title	Director(s)	Production Country
The Adamant Girl	கொட்டுக்காளி	PS Vinothraj	India
All the Long Nights	夜明けのすべて	Sho Miyake	Japan
The Cats of Gokogu Shrine	五香宮の猫	Kazuhiro Soda	Japan
The Editorial Office	Редакція Redaktsiya	Roman Bondarchuk	Ukraine, Germany, Slovakia, Czechia
Exhuma	파묘	Jang Jae-hyun	South Korea
Henry Fonda for President		Alexander Horwath	Austria, Germany
Holy Week	Săptămâna Mare	Andrei Cohn	Romania, Switzerland
L'homme-vertige: Tales Of A City		Malaury Eloi Paisley	France
The Human Hibernation		Anna Cornudella	Spain
In the Belly of a Tiger		Siddartha Jatla	India, United States, China, Indonesia, Taiwan
Intercepted		Oksana Karpovych	Canada, France, Ukraine
The Invisible Zoo	Der unsichtbare Zoo	Romuald Karmakar	Germany
Maria's Silence	Marijas klusums	Dāvis Sīmanis	Latvia, Lithuania
Mother and Daughter	Deda-Shvili	Lana Gogoberidze	France, Georgia
The Nights Still Smell Of Gunpowder	As noites ainda cheiram á pôlvora	Inadelso Cossa	Mozambique, Germany, France, Portugal, Netherlands, Norway
Oasis		Tamara Uribe, Felipe Morgado	Chile
Oasis of Now		Chee Sum Chia	Malaysia, Singapore, France
Reas		Lola Arias	Argentina, Germany, Switzerland
Reproduction	Reproduktion	Katharina Pethke	Germany
Republic	共和国	Jin Jiang	China, Singapore
Resonance Spiral		Marinho de Pina, Filipa César	Portugal, Guinea-Bissau, Germany
The Secret Drawer	Il cassetto segreto	Costanza Quatriglio	Italy, Switzerland
Shahid		Narges Kalhor	Germany
Skin in Spring	La piel en primavera	Yennifer Uribe Alzate	Colombia, Chile
Sleeping with a Tiger	Mit einem Tiger schlafen	Anja Salomonowitz	Austria
Traces of Movement before the Ice	Spuren von Bewegung vor dem Eis	René Frölke	Germany
True Chronicles of the Blida Joinville Psychiatric Hospital in the Last Century, when Dr Frantz Fanon Was Head of the Fifth Ward between 1953 and 1956	Chroniques fidèles survenues au siècle dernier à l’hôpital psychiatrique Blida-Joinville, au temps où le Docteur Frantz Fanon était chef de la cinquième division entre 1953 et 1956	Abdenour Zahzah	Algeria, France
The Undergrowth	La hojarasca	Macu Machín	Spain
Voices of the Silenced		Park Soo-nam, Park Maeui	Japan, South Korea
Well Ordered Nature	Ihre ergebenste Fräulein	Eva C. Heldmann	Germany
What Did You Dream Last Night, Parajanov?	Was hast du gestern geträumt, Parajanov?	Faraz Fesharaki	Germany
The Wrong Movie		Keren Cytter	United States, Belgium
Forum Expanded
for here am i sitting in a tin can far above the world		Gala Hernández López	France
Grandmamauntsistercat		Zuza Banasińska	Netherlands, Poland
Here We Are		Chanasorn Chaikitiporn	Thailand
O Seeker		Gavati Wad	India, United States
The Perfect Square		Gernot Wieland	Belgium, Germany
The Periphery of the Base	基地之侧	Zhou Tao	China
Quebrante		Janaina Wagner	Brazil
Room 404		Elysa Wendi and Shing Lee	Hong Kong, Poland
Sarcophagus of Drunken Loves		Joana Hadjithomas and Khalil Joreige	France, Lebanon

=== Generation ===
The following films are selected for the Generation sections:

English Title	Original Title	Director(s)	Production Country
Generation Kplus
Above the Dust	沃土	Wang Xiaoshuai	China, Netherland
Aguacuario		Jose Eduardo Castilla Ponce	Mexico
Amplified	Sukoun	Dina Naser	Egypt, Jordan
Butterfly	Papillon	Florence Miailhe	France
Fox and Hare Save the Forest	Fuchs und Hase retten den Wald	Mascha Halberstad	Belgium, Luxembourg, Netherlands
It's Okay!	괜찮아 괜찮아 괜찮아!	Kim Hye-young	South Korea
The Major Tones	Los tonos mayores	Ingrid Pokropek	Argentina, Spain
Porcelain	Porzellan	Annika Birgel	Germany
Reinas		Klaudia Reynicke	Switzerland, Spain, Peru
Sheep	Goosfand	Hadi Babaeifar	Iran
Sour Candy	Anaar Daana	Nishi Dugar	India
A Summer's End Poem	夏日句点	Lam Can-zhao	China, Malaysia, Switzerland
Through Rocks and Clouds	Raíz	Franco García Becerra	Chile, Peru
Uli		Mariana Gil Ríos	Colombia
Winners	Sieger sein	Soleen Yusef	Germany
Young Hearts	Junge Herzen	Anthony Schatteman	Belgium, Netherlands
Yuck!	Beurk!	Loïc Espuche	France
Generation 14plus
A Bird Flew	Un pájaro voló	Leinad Pájaro de la Hoz	Colombia, Cuba
Cura sana		Lucía G. Romero	Spain
Disco Afrika: A Malagasy Story	Disco Afrika: une histoire malgache	Luck Razanajaona	France, Germany, Madagascar, Mauritius, Qatar, South Africa
Elbow	Ellbogen	Aslı Özarslan	France, Germany, Turkey
Fin	Huling Palabas	Ryan Machado	Philippines
The Girl Who Lived in the Loo		Subarna Dash	India
The Great Phuket	小半截	Liu Yaonan	Belgium, China, France, Germany, Hong Kong
Invincible Summer	Un invincible été	Arnaud Dufeys	Belgium
Lapse	Lapso	Caroline Cavalcanti	Brazil
Last Swim		Sasha Nathwani	United Kingdom
Maydegol		Sarvnaz Alambeigi	France, Germany, Iran
Muna		Warda Mohamed	United Kingdom
My Summer with Irène	Quell'estate con Irène	Carlo Sironi	France, Italy
Resentment	Obraza	Gleb Osatinski	Lithuania, United States
She Sat There Like All Ordinary Ones	开始的枪	Qu Youjia	China
Songs of Love and Hate		Saurav Ghimire	Nepal
Who by Fire	Comme le feu	Philippe Lesage	Canada, France

=== Berlinale Classics ===
The following films are selected for the Berlinale Classics section:

English Title	Original Title	Director(s)	Production Country
After Hours (1985)		Martin Scorsese	United States
Battle in Heaven (2005)	Batalla en el cielo	Carlos Reygadas	Mexico
The Day of the Locust (1975)		John Schlesinger	United States
Deprisa, deprisa (1981)		Carlos Saura	Spain
Godzilla (1954)	ゴジラ	Ishirō Honda	Japan
Kohlhiesel's Daughters (1920)	Kohlhiesels Töchter	Ernst Lubitsch	Germany Republic
The Love Parade (1929)		Ernst Lubitsch	United States
The Sacrifice (1986)	Offret	Andrei Tarkovsky	Soviet Union
Time of Maturity (1976)	Reifezeit	Sohrab Shahid Saless	West Germany
The Wayward Cloud (2005)	天邊一朵雲	Tsai Ming-liang	Taiwan

=== Retrospective ===
The following films are selected for the Retrospective section:

English Title	Original Title	Director(s)	Production Country
Ain't Nothin' Without You (1985)	Nicht nichts ohne Dich	Pia Frankenberg	West Germany
Angels of Iron (1980)	Engel aus Eisen	Thomas Brasch	West Germany
Banale Tage (1991)		Peter Welz	Germany
Chapeau Claque (1971)		Ulrich Schamoni	West Germany
Dark Spring (1970)		Ingemo Engström	West Germany
Die Deutschen und ihre Männer – Bericht aus Bonn (1989)		Helke Sander	West Germany
The Endless Night (1963)	Die endlose Nacht	Will Tremper	West Germany
The German Chainsaw Massacre (1990)	Das deutsche Kettensägenmassaker	Christoph Schlingensief	Germany
The Goat's Intensity (1988)	Leuchtkraft der Ziege – Eine Naturerscheinung	Jochen Kraußer	East Germany
Herzsprung (1992)		Helke Misselwitz	Germany
Ich (1988)		Bettina Flitner	West Germany
In the Country of My Parents (1981)	Im Land meiner Eltern	Jeanine Meerapfel	West Germany
Jesus – The Film (1986)	Jesus – Der Film	Michael Brynntrup	West Germany, East Germany
Just Don't Think I'll Cry (1965)	Denk bloß nicht, ich heule	Frank Vogel	East Germany
Kismet, Kismet (1987)		Ismet Elçi	West Germany
Little Godard (1978)	Der kleine Godard. An das Kuratorium Junger Deutscher Film	Hellmuth Costard	West Germany
Macumba (1982)		Elfi Mikesch	West Germany
Purgatory (1971)	Fegefeuer	Haro Senft	West Germany
Shirin's Wedding (1975)	Shirins Hochzeit	Helma Sanders-Brahms	West Germany
Supermarket (1974)	Supermarkt	Roland Klick	West Germany
Tobby (1961)		Hansjürgen Pohland	West Germany
Two Among Millions (1961)	Zwei unter Millionen	Victor Vicas, Wieland Liebske	West Germany
Unsichtbare Tage oder Die Legende von den weißen Krokodilen (1991)		Eva Heller	Germany

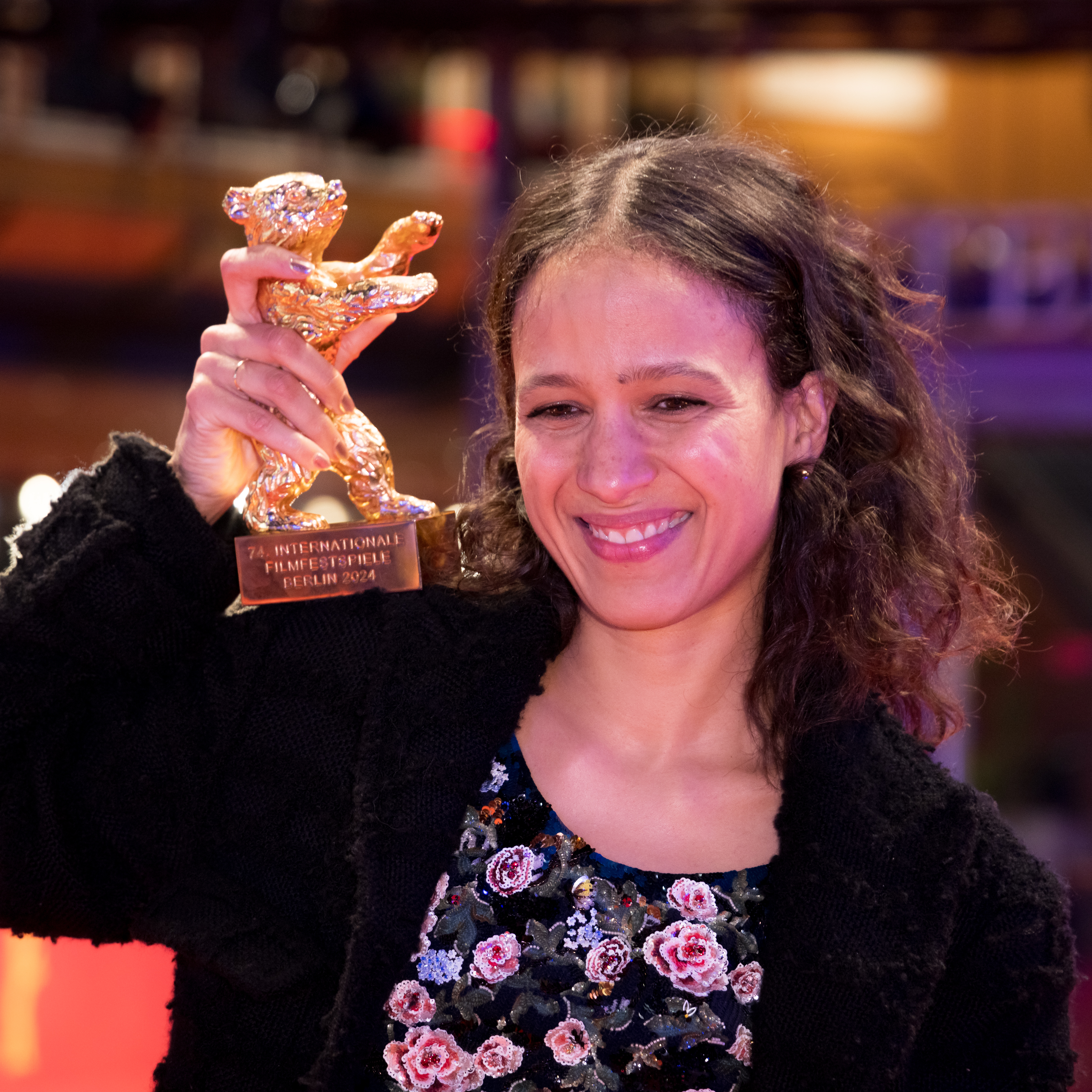
Mati Diop, Golden Bear winner

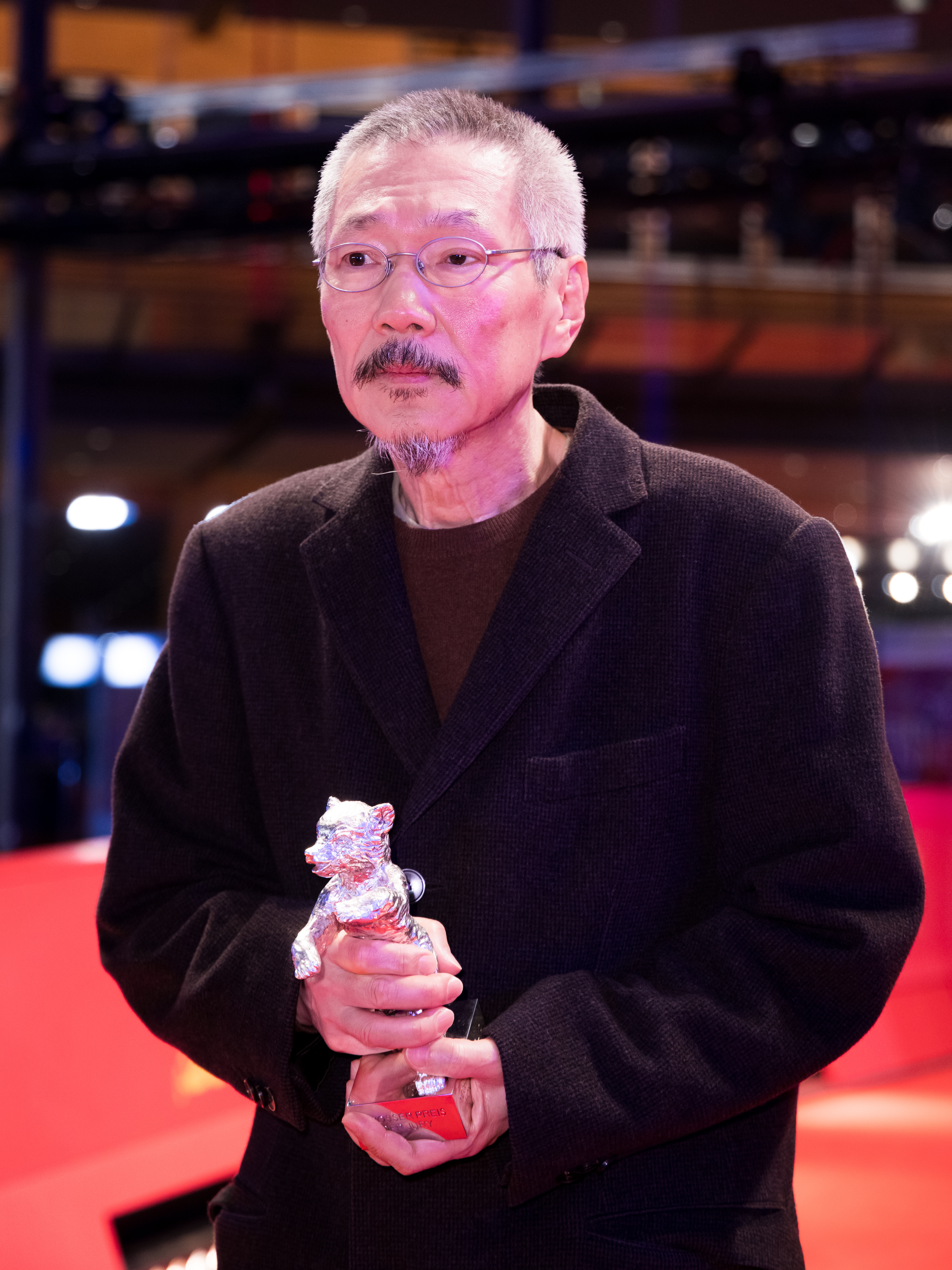
Hong Sang-soo, Silver Bear Grand Jury Prize winner

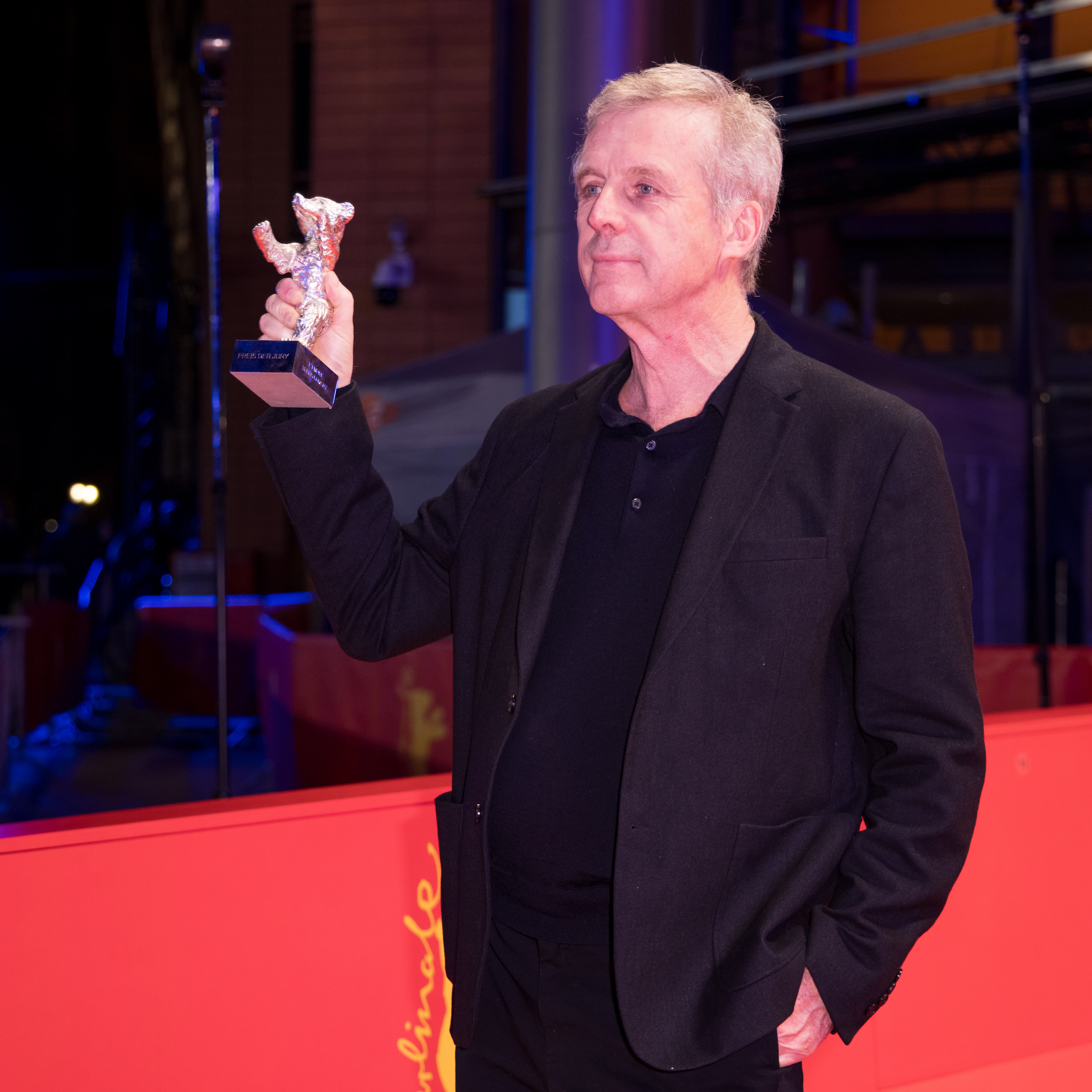
Bruno Dumont, Silver Bear Jury Prize winner

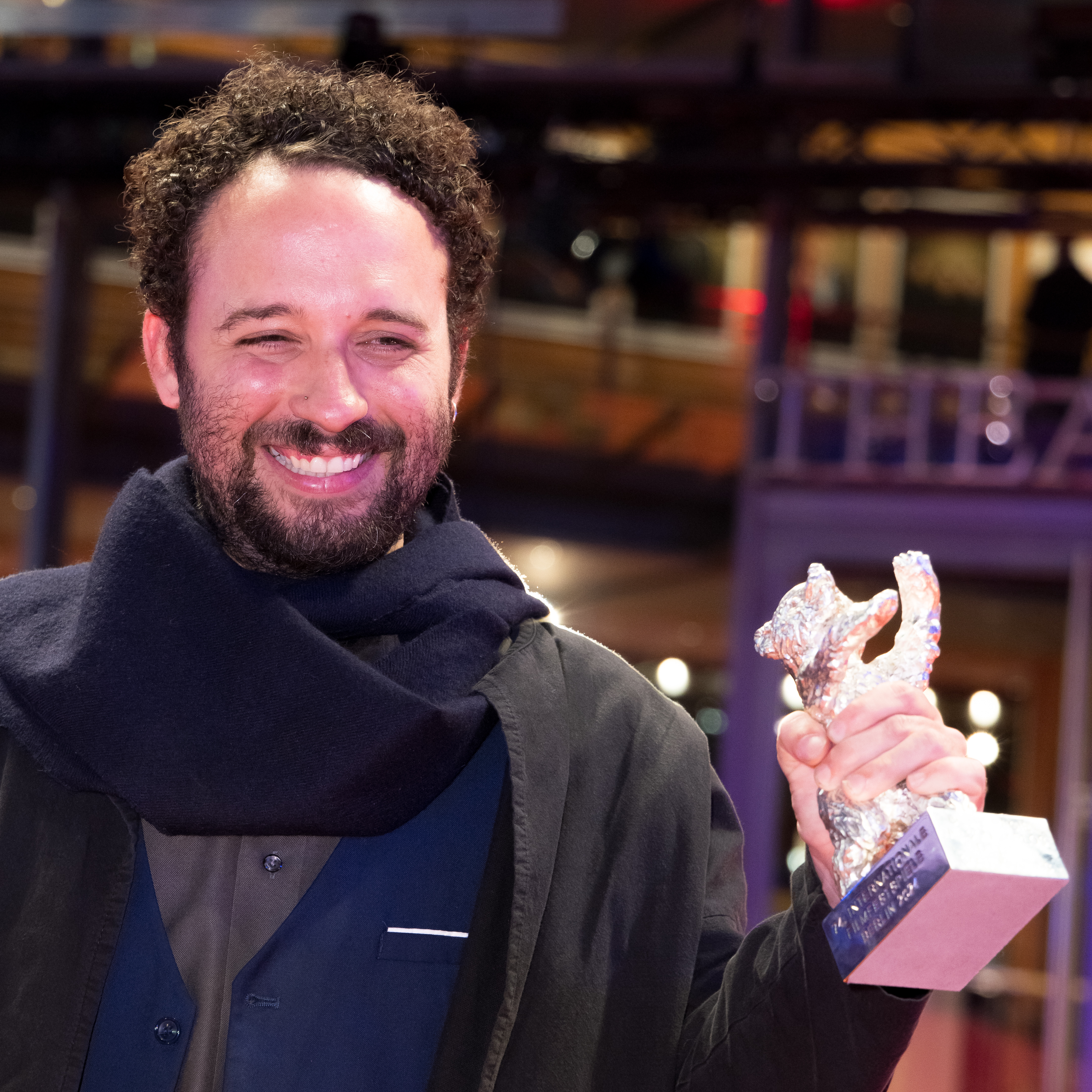
Nelson Carlos De Los Santos Arias, Silver Bear for Best Director winner

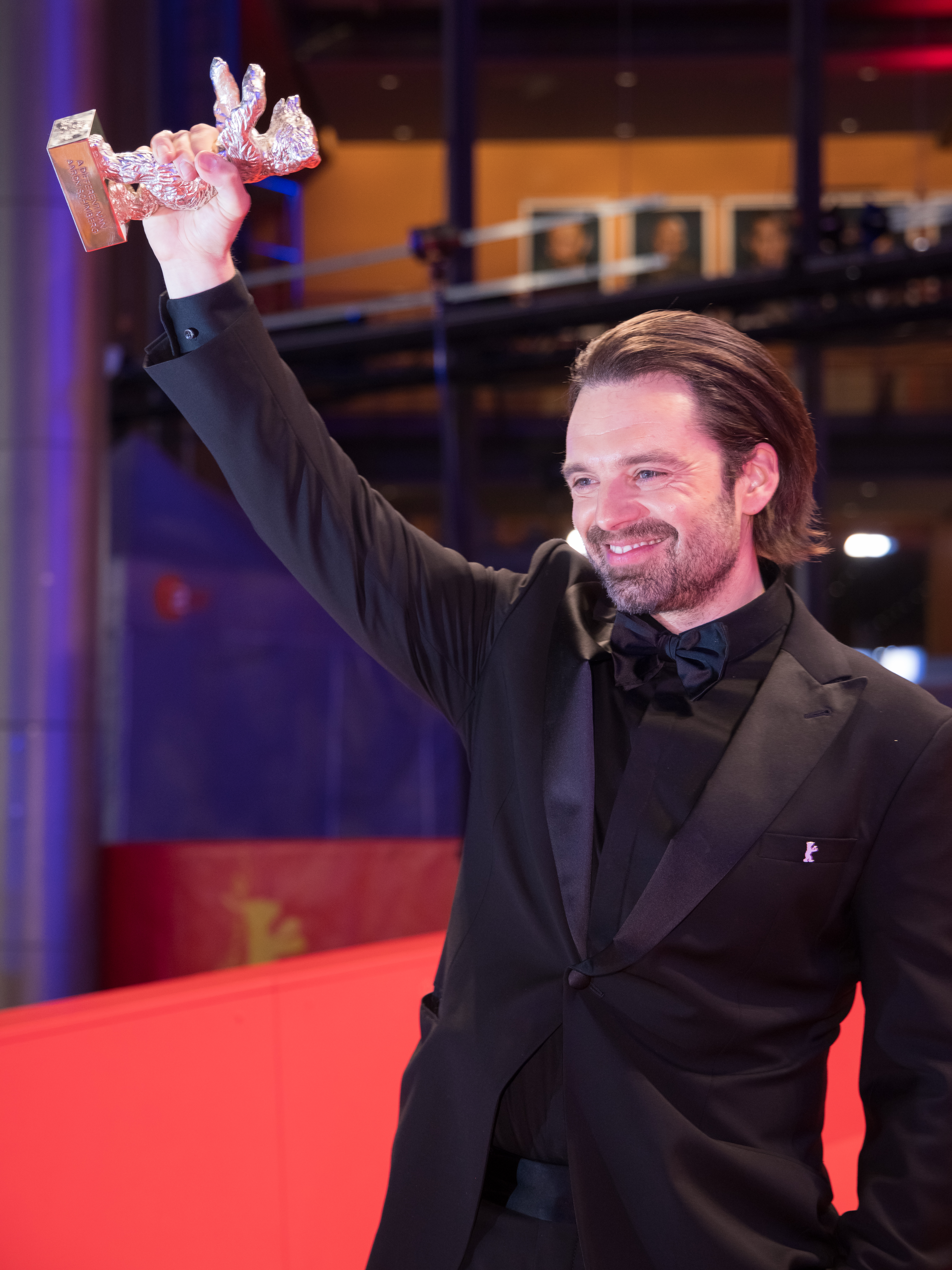
Sebastian Stan, Silver Bear for Best Leading Performance winner

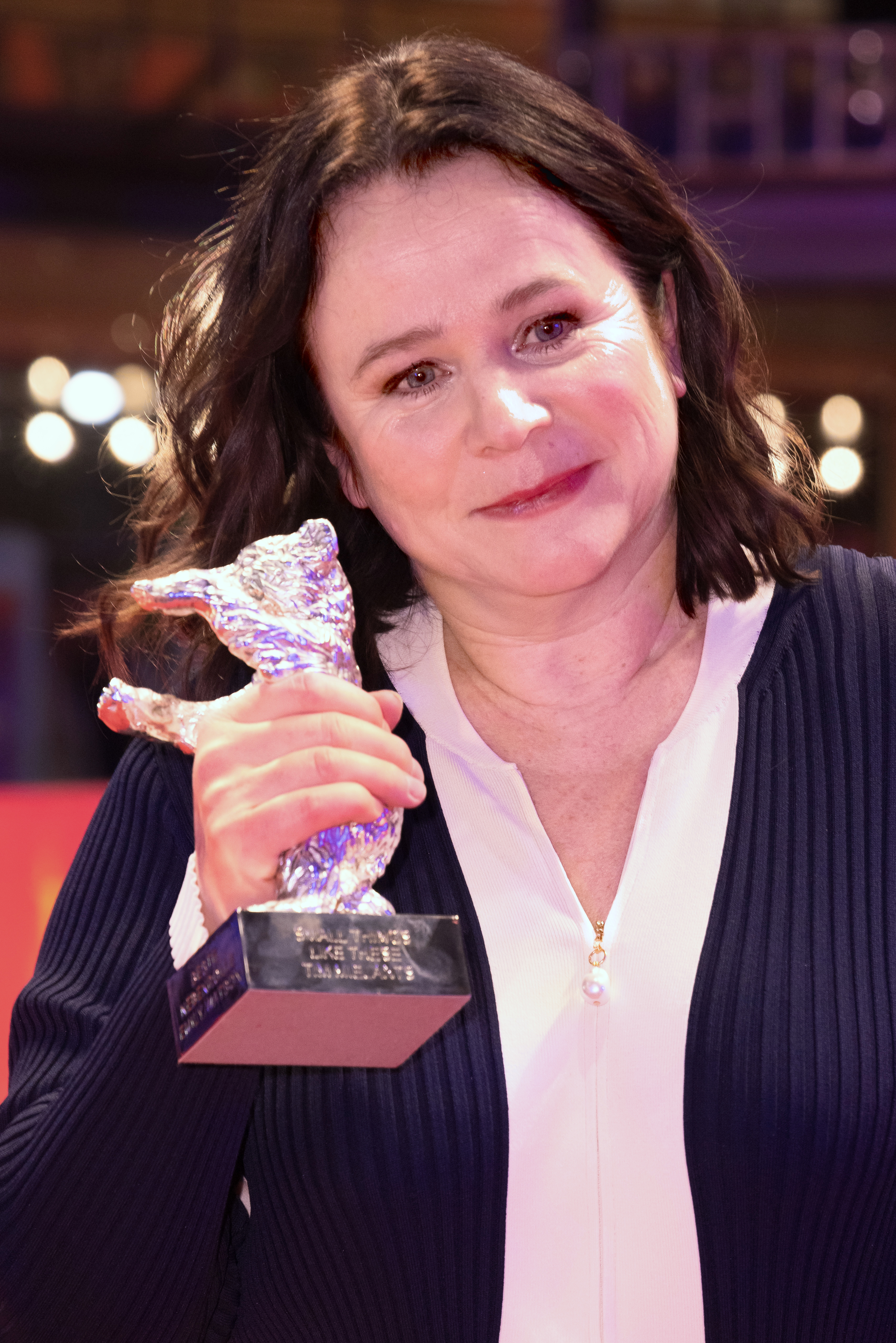
Emily Watson, Silver Bear for Best Supporting Performance winner

== Official Awards ==
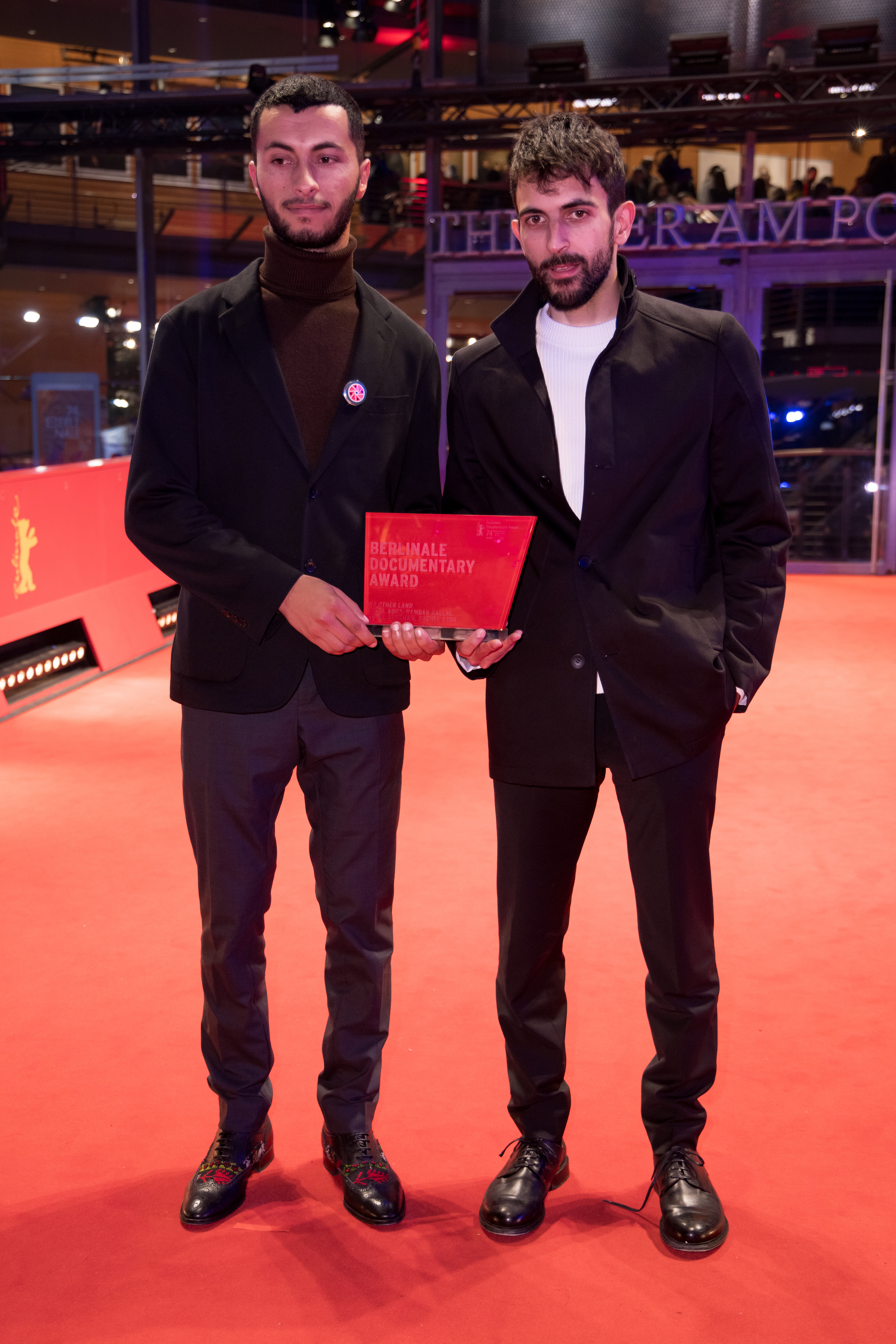
Basel Adra and Yuval Abraham with the Documentary Award

=== Main Competition ===
- Golden Bear: Dahomey by Mati Diop
- Silver Bear Grand Jury Prize: A Traveler's Needs by Hong Sang-soo
- Silver Bear Jury Prize: The Empire by Bruno Dumont
- Silver Bear for Best Director: Nelson Carlo De Los Santos Arias for Pepe
- Silver Bear for Best Leading Performance: Sebastian Stan for A Different Man
- Silver Bear for Best Supporting Performance: Emily Watson for Small Things Like These
- Silver Bear for Best Screenplay: Matthias Glasner for Dying
- Silver Bear for Outstanding Artistic Contribution: Martin Gschlacht for The Devil's Bath (cinematography)

=== Honorary Golden Bear ===
- Martin Scorsese

=== Berlinale Camera ===
- Edgar Reitz

=== GWFF Best First Feature Award ===
- Cu Li Never Cries by Phạm Ngọc Lân

=== Berlinale Documentary Award ===
- No Other Land by Basel Adra, Hamdan Ballal, Yuval Abraham, Rachel Szor
  - Special Mention: Direct Action by Guillaume Cailleau and Ben Russell

=== Encounters ===
- Best Film: Direct Action by Guillaume Cailleau and Ben Russell
- Best Director: Juliana Rojas for Cidade; Campo
- Special Jury Award:
  - Some Rain Must Fall by Qiu Yang
  - The Great Yawn of History by Aliyar Rasti

=== Berlinale Short Films Competition ===
- Golden Bear for Best Short Film: An Odd Turn by Francisco Lezama
- Silver Bear Jury Prize: Remains of the Hot Day by Wenqian Zhang
  - Special Mention: That's All from Me by Eva Könnemann
- Berlin Short Film Candidate for the European Film Awards: That's All from Me by Eva Könnemann

=== Generation ===
Generation Kplus International Jury

- Grand Prix of the International Jury for the Best Film: Reinas by Klaudia Reynicke
  - Special Mention: Through Rocks and Clouds by Franco García Becerra
- Special Prize of the International Jury for the Best Short Film: A Summer's End Poem by Lam Can-zhao
  - Special Mention: Uli by Mariana Gil Ríos

Generation 14plus International Jury

- Grand Prix of the International Jury for the Best Film: Who by Fire by Philippe Lesage
  - Special Mention: Maydegol by Sarvnaz Alambeigi
- Special Prize of the International Jury for the Best Short Film: A Bird Flew by Leinad Pájaro De la Hoz
  - Special Mention: Songs of Love and Hate by Saurav Ghimire

Children's Jury Generation Kplus

- Crystal Bear for the Best Film: It's Okay! by Kim Hye-young
  - Special Mention: Young Hearts by Anthony Schatteman
- Crystal Bear for the Best Short Film: Butterfly (Papillon) by Florence Miailhe
  - Special Mention: Amplified by Dina Naser

Youth Jury Generation 14plus

- Crystal Bear for the Best Film: Last Swim by Sasha Nathwani
  - Special Mention: She Sat There Like All Ordinary Ones by Qu Youjia
- Crystal Bear for the Best Short Film: Cura sana by Lucía G. Romero
  - Special Mention: Lapse by Caroline Cavalcanti

== Independent Awards ==
=== Panorama Audience Award ===
Feature film

- 1st place: Memories of a Burning Body by Antonella Sudasassi Furniss
- 2nd place: Crossing by Levan Akin
- 3rd place: All Shall Be Well by Ray Yeung

Documentary

- 1st place: No Other Land by Basel Adra, Hamdan Ballal, Yuval Abraham, Rachel Szor
- 2nd place: My Stolen Planet by Farahnaz Sharifi
- 3rd place: Teaches of Peaches by Philipp Fussenegger, Judy Landkammer

=== Teddy Award ===
- Best Feature Film: All Shall Be Well by Ray Yeung (Panorama)
- Best Documentary/Essay Film: Teaches of Peaches by Philipp Fussenegger, Judy Landkammer (Panorama)
- Best Short Film: Grandmamauntsistercat by Zuza Banasińska (Forum Expanded)
- Teddy Jury Award: Crossing by Levan Akin (Panorama)
- Special Teddy Award: Lothar Lambert

== Controversies ==
=== Iranian censorship ===
Shortly before the Iranian film My Favourite Cake was selected for the Main Competition, filmmakers Behtash Sanaeeha and Maryam Moqadam were banned from leaving Iran to attend the Festival, had their passports confiscated, and will face a court trial in relation to their work as artists and filmmakers. The Iranian government decision was met, once again, with international protests, following Golden Bear winners Jafar Panahi and Mohammad Rasoulof arrests in 2022/2023, and numerous others censorship attempts in the last years.

=== Rescinsion of AfD invitation ===
Amid controversy, Berlinale's directors Mariette Rissenbeek and Carlo Chatrian rescinded its decision to invite representatives of the far-right party Alternative for Germany (German: Alternative für Deutschland, AfD) to attend the festival's Opening Ceremony Gala. The decision followed a number of controversies around the party's statements in opposition to immigration. An open letter was signed by over 200 German cultural industry professionals expressing outrage with the invitations.

=== Gaza war protests ===
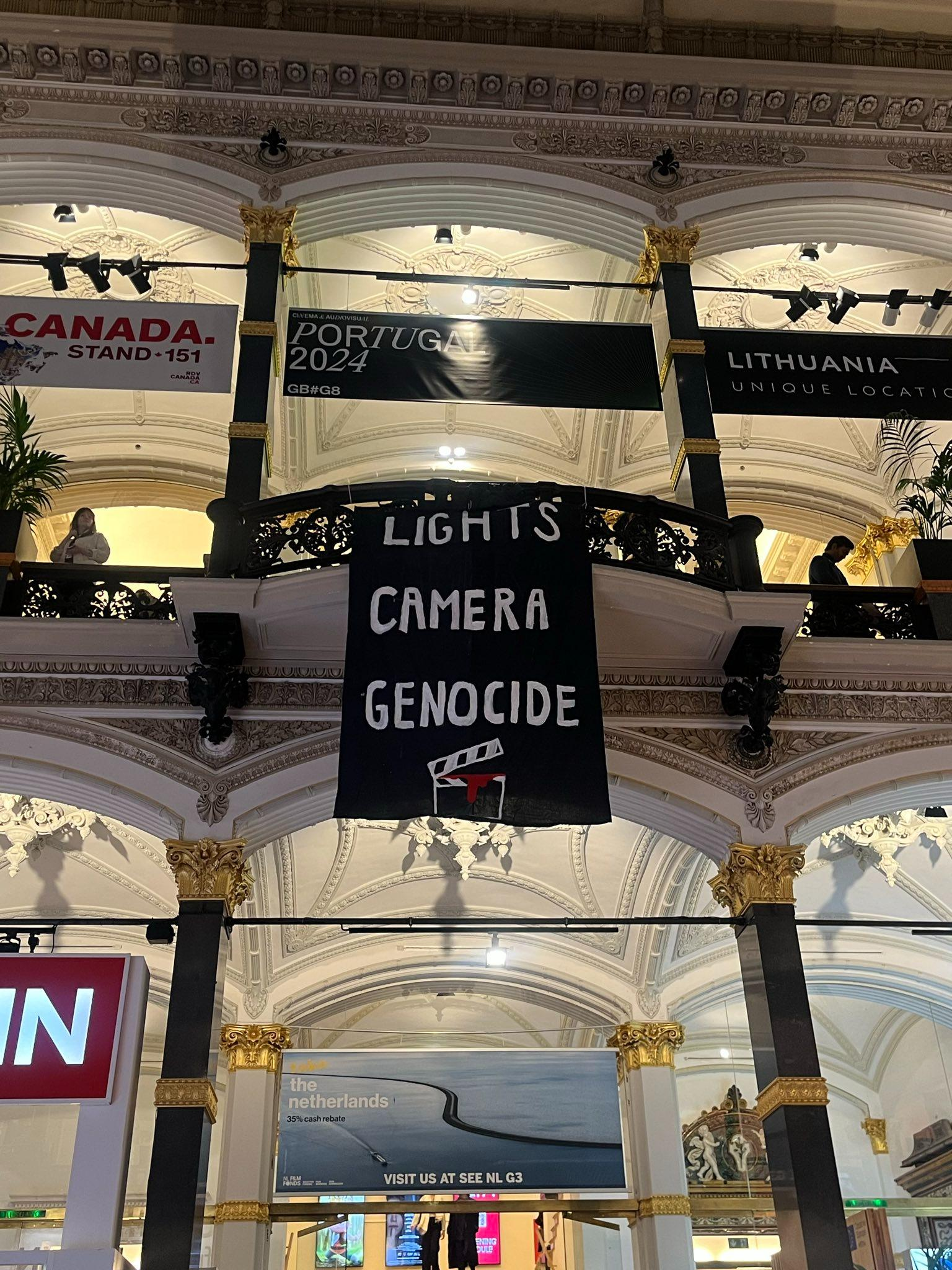
Protesters unfurled a "Lights Camera Genocide" banner at the 2024 European Film Market, arguing that the Berlinale and Germany are complicit in another genocide.

In the introductory press release for the 2024 festival, Berlinale opted not to mention freedom of speech as one of their core values, despite having done so in the previous year's statement. During the festival, hundreds of past and present Berlinale participants signed open letters criticizing Berlinale's complicity in Germany's censorship of pro-Palestine voices amidst the backdrop of the Gaza war, including over 280 Berlinale Talents alumni, over 190 filmmakers with films in the 2024 festival and over 60 Berlinale contractors. In further protest, John Greyson, Suneil Sanzgiri and Ayo Tsalithaba all withdrew their films from the festival, while Maryam Tafakory, Advik Beni, and Monica Sorelle dropped out of the Berlinale Talents programme, and Emilia Beatriz withdrew from the European Film Market. Unlike its response to the public's outrage at the AfD invitation, Berlinale directors remained silent to the demands of their filmmakers, alumni, and contractors in support of Palestine.

Throughout the festival, artists continued to use their platforms to make statements in solidarity with Palestine. On February 16, curators of the Berlinale's Forum Expanded program joined artist's expressions of solidarity, stating, "We, too, want to add our voice and share our concern by expressing that the Forum Expanded curators support the urgent call for an immediate ceasefire in Gaza." On February 18, pro-Palestine activists laid down on the front steps of the Gropius Bau drenched in fake blood with a sign reading, “Welcome to the Red Carpet,” while inside the building others unfurled pro-Palestinian banners from the upper floor.

During the Closing Night Ceremony at the Berlinale Palast, on February 25, there were numerous pro-Palestine statements and protests during the red carpet and acceptance speeches, including from Golden Bear winner Mati Diop, and Palestinian and Israeli filmmakers Basel Adra, Hamdan Ballal, Yuval Abraham, and Rachel Szor, the four of whom directed No Other Land. The Teddy Award jury posted a statement in solidarity with Gaza which was met with audience applause as well as loud booing. An Instagram account linked to the Panorama section published an allegedly official statement from the festival organizers, stating "we acknowledge that our silence makes us complicit in Israel's ongoing genocide in Gaza and ethnic cleansing of Palestine" adding: "From our unresolved Nazi past to our genocidal present – we have always been on the wrong side of history." Minutes later, the Berlinale's main Instagram account stated that the Panorama account was hacked and the posts "do not represent the Berlinale's position", and announced plans to “file criminal charges against unknown persons”.

During his acceptance speech after winning the Best Documentary award, No Other Land co-director Abraham stated, referring to his Palestinian co-director Adra: "I am under civilian law; Basel [Adra] is under military law. We live 30 minutes from one another but I have voting rights. Basel does not have voting rights. I am free to move where I want in this land. Basel, like millions of Palestinians, is locked in the occupied West Bank. This situation of apartheid between us, this inequality, has to end". Berlin Mayor, Kai Wegner, and numerous other German politicians expressed outrage, calling the closing ceremony statements "anti-Semitic". Germany's minister of state for culture Claudia Roth was criticized for clapping during Adra and Abraham's speech, and she later claimed that she was only clapping for Abraham, declaring that "The statements at the Bears ceremony were shockingly one-sided and characterized by a profound hatred of Israel". While the Festival is mainly funded by the German government, the organizers stated that the "filmmakers' statements were independent and should be accepted as long as they respect the legal framework". Following the ceremony, Abraham said that a right-wing mob in Israel had threatened his family, stating, "The appalling misuse of this word by Germans... to silence Israelis like me who support a ceasefire... empties the word antisemitism of meaning and thus endangers Jews all over the world".
