= Bratislava (band) =

Brazilian rock band

- Origin: São Paulo, São Paulo, Brazil
- Genres: Alternative rock, progressive rock, experimental rock
- Years active: 2010–present
- Members: Victor Meira; Jonas Andrade; José Roberto Orlando; Lucas Felipe Franco
- Past members: Sandro Cobeleanschi; Alexandre Meira; Edu Barreto; Sophian Ferey; Ricardo Almeida
- Website: www.bratislava.com.br

Bratislava is a Brazilian rock band formed in São Paulo in 2010. The current line-up consists of Victor Meira (vocals, keyboards, synthesizer), Jonas Andrade (guitar), José Roberto Orlando (bass) and Lucas Felipe Franco (drums). Their second album, Um Pouco Mais de Silêncio, released in a fanzine format, was featured in various 2015 "best of" lists by specialized sites (Brasileiríssimos, Embrulhador, Rockinpress, O Jardim Elétrico). Newspaper O Estado de S. Paulo considered the band one of the musical bets for 2016.

== History ==
Bratislava started in 2009 when brothers Victor (born in Bahia) and Alexandre Meira wanted to provide an outflow for their musical ideas they'd been developing prior to establishing the band.

In 2011, the band released its first record, the EP Longe do Sono ("Away from Sleepiness") recorded and released independently. Their debut album, Carne ("Meat") would come the following year, bringing many topics in its lyrics. The title alludes to one of the stories of the Brazilian comic book Mundo Pet (2004), by Lourenço Mutarelli, in which the character starts having hallucinations caused by memories contained in the meat of the animals he feeds on. The album's promotional cycle involved many live sessions and related material.

The quartet started the project Converse Rubber Tracks in Brazil in February 2014, performing the first show.

In 2015, they released their sophomore album Um Pouco Mais de Silêncio ("A Little Bit More of Silence"), again in fanzine format, this one interactive and handicrafted. The name of the album is a section of the second-to-last track and references the musicality of the new effort, which is more paused, contemplative and atmospheric than its predecessor.

In 2017, they performed at Lollapalooza Brasil. In the same year, they released the track "Enterro", featuring Scalene's vocalist Gustavo Bertoni. The track was taken from their then upcoming third album Fogo ("Fire") and it deals with the Mariana dam disaster. According to João Paulo Carvalho, from O Estado de S. Paulo, Fogo "has stronger and more convincing lyrics. With clear and straight messages, dream is the most present topic in the tracks' lyrics".

== Members ==
- Victor Meira – vocals, keyboard, synthesizer
- José Roberto Orlando – bass
- Jonas Andrade – guitar
- Lucas Felipe Franco – drums

=== Past members ===
- Alexandre Meira – guitar, backing vocals
- Sandro Cobeleanschi – bass
- Ricardo Almeida – drums
- Sophian Ferey – drums
- Edu Barreto – guitar

== Discography ==
=== Albums ===
- Carne (2012)
- Um Pouco Mais de Silêncio (2015)
- Fogo (2017)

=== EPs ===
- Longe do Sono (2011)
- Aprender a Morrer (2018)

== Awards and nominations ==
=== Prêmio Profissionais da Música ===
2016

- Nominated for the Rock'n Blues category
