= Marco Dutra =

Brazilian film director (born 1980)

- Born: Marco Aurélio Ferreira Dutra; 17 March 1980 (age 45); São Paulo,São Paulo, Brazil
- Occupations: Film director, screenwriter,composer

Marco Aurélio Ferreira Dutra (born 17 March 1980), known as Marco Dutra is a Brazilian film director, screenwriter, and composer.

== Life and career ==
Dutra graduated in Cinema at the School of Communications and Arts of the University of São Paulo. He has been working since college with the director Juliana Rojas, with whom he made the short film O Lençol Branco in 2004; the film was exhibited by Cinéfondation in Cannes. Dutra and Rojas also worked together in the 2007 short film "Um Ramo".In 2011 they, directed their first feature film Hard Labor, exhibited at Cannes' Un certain regard .

Dutra also worked as screenwriter in films such as No Meu Lugar (2009) by Eduardo Valente, and for the 2009 HBO Brasil TV series Alice.

In 2014 he made his second feature film, Quando Eu Era Vivo, starring Sandy Leah, Antônio Fagundes and Marat Descartes.

== Filmography ==
=== As director and writer ===
Short and feature films
Year	Title	Notes
2004	Concerto Número Três	Director and writer
2004	Lençol Branco	Director and writer
2007	Um Ramo	Director and writer
2009	No Meu Lugar	Writer
2009	As Sombras	Director and writer
2011	Hard Labor	Director and writer (with Juliana Rojas)
2011	My Country	Writer
2014	Quando Eu Era Vivo	Director and writer (with Gabriela Amaral Almeida)
2016	O Silêncio do Céu	Writer
2017	Good Manners	Director and writer (with Juliana Rojas)
2018	A Voz do Silêncio	Writer (with André Ristum)
2020	All the Dead Ones	Director and writer (with Caetano Gotardo)
2025	Bury your Dead	Director and writer (with Caetano Gotardo)

=== As composer ===
Film compositions
Year	Title	Notes
2014	Quando Eu Era Vivo	Composer
2012	O Que Se Move	Theme song composer
