= All the Dead Ones =

2020 Brazilian drama film

- Theatrical release poster
- Directed by: Caetano Gotardo; Marco Dutra
- Written by: Caetano Gotardo; Marco Dutra
- Produced by: Florence Cohen; Clément Duboin; Maria Ionescu; Sara Silveira
- Starring: Mawusi Tulani; Clarissa Kiste; Carolina Bianchi; Thaia Perez; Agyei Augusto; Thomás Aquino; Leonor Silveira
- Cinematography: Hélène Louvart
- Edited by: Marco Dutra; Caetano Gotardo; Juliana Rojas
- Music by: Gui Braz; Salloma Salomão
- Production companies: Dezenove Filmes; Good Fortune; Filmes do Caixote
- Distributed by: Vitrine Filmes (Brazil)
- Release dates: February 23, 2020 (Berlinale); December 10, 2020 (Brazil)
- Running time: 120 minutes
- Countries: Brazil; France
- Language: Portuguese

All the Dead Ones (Portuguese: Todos os mortos) is a 2020 drama film directed by Caetano Gotardo and Marco Dutra. Starring Mawusi Tulani, Clarissa Kiste, Thaia Perez,Thomás Aquino and Leonor Silveira.

The film had itrs world premiere at the main competition of the 70th Berlin International Film Festival, where it was nominated for the Golden Bear.

== Plot ==
São Paulo, 1899. Eleven years after the abolition of slavery, the women of Soares family, landowners and slaveholders in the near past, do not give up of the privileges that still survive in the white society. While Iná Nascimento, a formerly enslaved black woman, struggle to reunite family members in a hostile post-slavery Brazil.

== Cast ==
- Mawusi Tulani as Iná Nascimento
- Clarissa Kiste as Maria Soares
- Thaia Perez as Isabel Soares
- Carolina Bianchi as Ana Soares
- Thomás Aquino as Eduardo
- Leonor Silveira as Dona Romilda
- Agyei Augusto as João Nascimento
- Alaíde Costa as Josefina
- Rogério Brito as Antônio Nascimento
- Andrea Marquee as Carolina
- Luciano Chirolli as Jorge Soares
- Teca Pereira as Doca
- Gilda Nomacce as Irmã Flora

== Reception ==
The review aggregator website Rotten Tomatoes reports an approval rating of 57% with an average score of 9/10, based on seven reviews.
