= Mutarelli =

Mutarelli is an Italian surname. Notable people with the surname include:

- Lourenço Mutarelli (born 1964), Brazilian comic book artist, writer, and actor
- Massimo Mutarelli (born 1978), Italian footballer
