= Florence Miailhe =

French animated film director

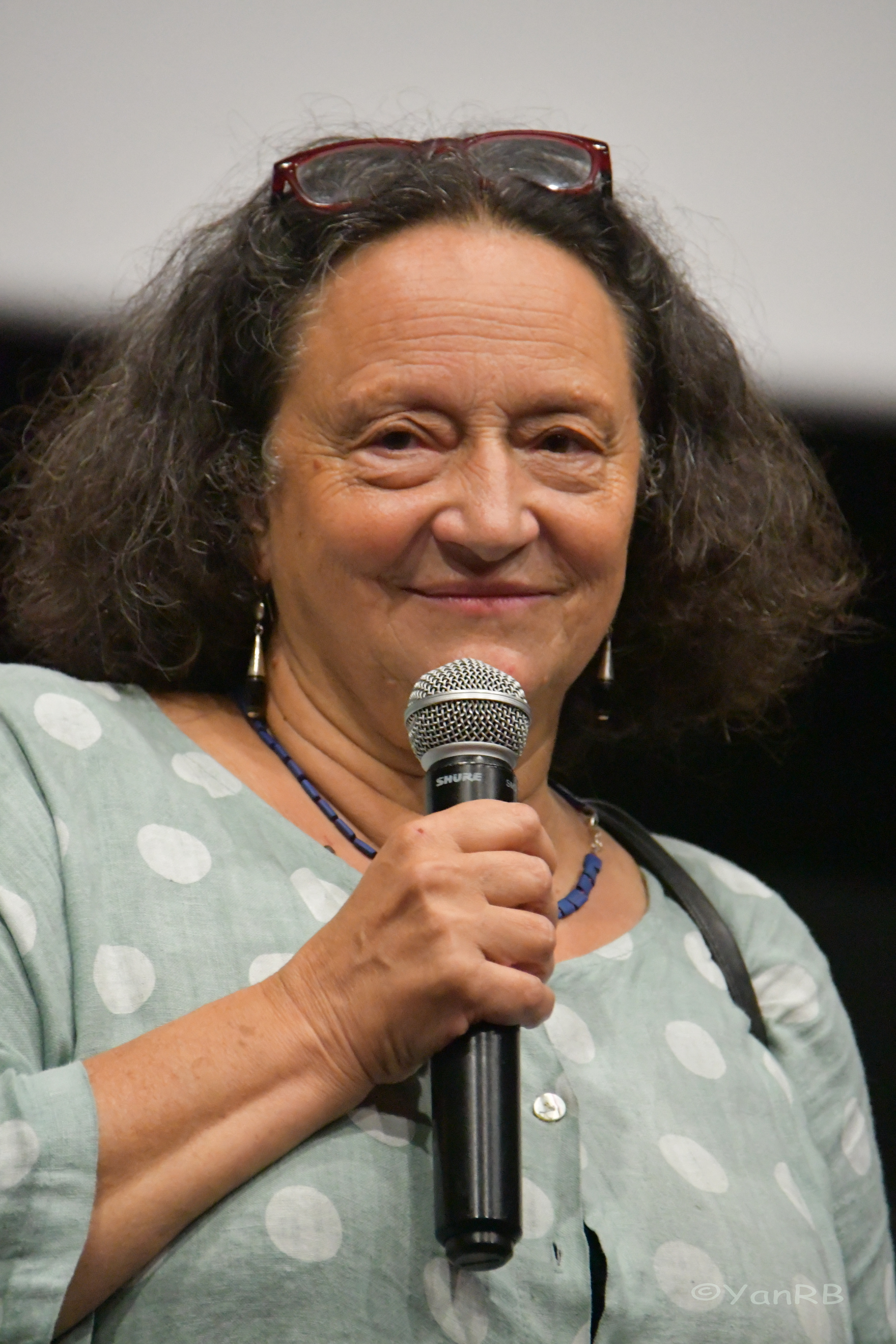
- Born: 1956 (age 69–70); Paris, France
- Occupations: film director, animator
- Years active: 1990s-present
- Notable work: The Crossing, Butterfly

Florence Miailhe (born 1956) is a French animator, most noted for her films The Crossing (La Traversée) and Butterfly (Papillon).

The daughter of painter Mireille Miailhe, she graduated from the École nationale supérieure des arts décoratifs in 1980, and began her career as a painter, engraver and model maker.

== Filmography ==
- Hammam - 1991
- Shéhérazade - 1995
- Histoire d'un prince devenu borgne et mendiant - 1996
- A Summer Night Rendez-vous (Au premier dimanche d'août) - 2002
- Les oiseaux blancs, les oiseaux noirs - 2003
- Conte de quartier - 2006
- Matières à rêver - 2008
- Méandres - 2013, with Elodie Bouedec, Mathilde Philippon-Aginski
- Actéon - 2013
- The Crossing (La Traversée) - 2021
- Butterfly (Papillon) - 2024

== Awards ==
Award	Year	Category	Work	Result	Ref.
Academy Awards	2026	Best Animated Short Film	Butterfly (Papillon)	Nominated	
Annecy International Animation Film Festival	2021	Jury Distinction, Best Feature Film Competition	The Crossing (La Traversée)	Won	
Annecy International Animation Film Festival	2024	André Martin Award for Best French Short Film	Butterfly (Papillon)	Won	
Berlin International Film Festival	2024	Crystal Bear for Best Short Film	Butterfly (Papillon)	Won	
Cannes Film Festival	2006	Short Film Palme d'Or	Conte de quartier	Honored	
César Awards	1993	Best Short Film	Hammam	Nominated	
César Awards	2002	Best Short Film	A Summer Night Rendez-vous (Au premier dimanche d'août)	Won	
César Awards	2022	Best Animated Film	The Crossing (La Traversée)	Nominated	
César Awards	2025	Best Animated Short Film	Butterfly (Papillon)	Nominated	
Festival du nouveau cinéma	2021	International Competition, Prix de l’innovation Daniel Langlois	The Crossing (La Traversée)	Won	
Festival du nouveau cinéma	2021	Eurimages Audentia Award	The Crossing (La Traversée)	Won	
Lumière Awards	2022	Best Animated Film	The Crossing (La Traversée)	Nominated	
Paris Film Critics Association Awards	2022	Best Animated Film	The Crossing (La Traversée)	Nominated	
Santa Barbara International Film Festival	2026	Best Animated Short Film	Butterfly (Papillon)	Won	
