= An Odd Turn =

2024 Argentine short film

- Berlinale release poster
- Spanish: Un movimiento extraño
- Literally: A strange movement
- Directed by: Francisco Lezama
- Screenplay by: Francisco Lezama
- Produced by: Iván Moscovich; Juan Segundo Alamos; Francisco Lezama; Jerónimo Quevedo; Victoria Marotta; Adrien Cothier; Pedro H. Murcia
- Starring: Laila Maltz; Paco Gorriz
- Cinematography: Federico Lastra
- Edited by: Franco Figueroa
- Production companies: 36 Caballos; Un Puma; The Zanuck Company
- Distributed by: 36 Caballos
- Release date: 17 February 2024 (Berlinale)
- Running time: 22 minutes
- Country: Argentina
- Language: Spanish

An Odd Turn (Spanish: Un movimiento extraño) is a 2024 Argentine drama short film written and directed by Francisco Lezama. Starring Laila Maltz, the film tells the story of a security guard who senses the theft of a work of art.

It was selected in the Berlinale Shorts section at the 74th Berlin International Film Festival, where it had its world premiere on 17 February, and won Golden Bear for Best Short Film.

== Synopsis ==
In 2019, a theft is about to happen at a museum in Buenos Aires. A security guard senses it and uses her pendulum to predict the future. She sees that the dollar will skyrocket soon. She loses her job and gets a generous severance pay. She meets an employee of a money changer, with whom she falls in love.

== Cast ==
- Laila Maltz as Lucrecia
- Paco Gorriz as Exchange House Guy
- Sofía Palomino as Security Guard 1
- Cecilia Rainero as Human Resources Woman 1
- Marcela Guerty as Human Resources Woman 2
- Guillermo Massé as Security Guard
- Susana Pampín as Client
- Alejandro Russek as Grindr Guy
- Jorge Prado as Security Guard
- Eugenia Alonso as Client

== Release ==
An Odd Turn had its World premiere on 17 February 2024, as part of the 74th Berlin International Film Festival, in the Berlinale Shorts.

== Accolades ==
Award	Date	Category	Recipient	Result	Ref.
Berlin International Film Festival	25 February 2024	Golden Bear for Best Short Film	An Odd Turn	Won	
