= Maydegol =

2024 Iranian documentary film

- Festival release poster
- Directed by: Sarvnaz Alambeigi
- Written by: Sarvnaz Alambeigi
- Produced by: Katayoon Shahabi; Sarvnaz Alambeigi
- Starring: Maydegol
- Cinematography: Mehdi Azadi
- Edited by: Hamid Najafirad
- Production companies: Rabison Art; Noori Pictures
- Distributed by: Taskovski Films
- Release date: 18 February 2024 (Berlinale)
- Running time: 73 minutes
- Countries: Iran; Germany; France
- Languages: Persian; Dari

Maydegol is a 2024 documentary film written and directed by Sarvnaz Alambeigi. The work is about an Afghan teenager Maydegol, an immigrant in Iran, who strives to pursue her dream of becoming a professional Muay Thai boxer while battling the social injustice and violence she encounters beyond the ring.

The international co-production between Iran, Germany and France was selected in the Generation 14plus section at the 74th Berlin International Film Festival, where it had its World premiere on 18 February and competed for Crystal Bear for the Best Film, and got Special Mention Generation 14plus award. The film was also nominated for the Berlinale Documentary Film Award.

== Contents ==
Maydegol is a film that shows the resilience of Generation Z who want to break free from their hopeless situations and claim their rights, especially young women who seek liberation – even if it means risking their lives. The film also reflects the audience's own power.

Maydegol, from an Afghan immigrant family in Iran has dream of becoming a Muay Thai boxer. She does not let her family's traditional views, her past trauma or the discrimination she faces stop her from following her passion. She secretly pays for her boxing lessons by working hard. She sees boxing as a way to not only win in the ring but also cope with life's challenges.

== Cast ==
- Maydegol
- Mohadesseh
- Farzaneh

== Release ==
Maydegol had its World premiere on 18 February 2024, as part of the 74th Berlin International Film Festival, in Generation 14plus.

In February 2024, Taskovski Films Sales acquired the sales rights of the film prior to its Berlinale premiere.

On 31 October 2024, the film was showcased at the 37th Tokyo International Film Festival in 'Women’s Empowerment' section.

It will have its United States premiere at the 40th Santa Barbara International Film Festival on 13 February 2025.

== Reception ==
Fabien Lemercier reviewing the film at Berlinale for Cineuropa wrote, "Maydegol turns out to be a female documentary immersion of a kind that is rare in Iran, filmed in a raw style and full of very moving resonance (“we belong to nothing”) about the courage and resilience necessary to face the harshness of the world."

== Accolades ==
Award	Date	Category	Recipient	Result	Ref.
Berlin International Film Festival	25 February 2024	The Grand Prix of the International Jury: Special Mention	Sarvnaz Alambeigi	Won	
Berlin International Film Festival	25 February 2024	Berlinale Documentary Film Award	Sarvnaz Alambeigi	Nominated	
