= Cura sana =

2024 Spanish short film

- Festival release poster
- Literally: Healthy care
- Directed by: Lucía G. Romero
- Screenplay by: Lucía G. Romero
- Produced by: Ruth Porro Gisbert; Borja Nández
- Starring: Roser Rendon Ena; Rasvely Lissette Donaire Restituyo
- Cinematography: Gemma de Miguel
- Edited by: Marina Ayet
- Music by: Oriol Brunet
- Production company: ESCAC Films
- Release date: 19 February 2024 (Berlinale)
- Running time: 18 minutes
- Country: Spain
- Language: Spanish

Cura sana is a 2024 Spanish short drama film written and directed by Lucía G. Romero. It tells the story of two sisters, Jessica and Alma, who are victims of domestic violence at home and therefore treat each other with violence.

It was selected in the Generation 14plus section at the 74th Berlin International Film Festival, where it had its World premiere on 19 February and won Crystal Bear for the Best Short Film.

== Synopsis ==
On the night of Noche de San Juan festival, a festival in Spain, two sisters are heading to Caritas to get food aid. Jessica, 16, and Alma, 8, have suffered from their father's abuse for a long time. This has made Jessica a bitter, self-harming teen who shields herself from others. She even mistreats her little sister with cruelty and hostility. However, as they travel together, Jessica understands that she does not want to be like her father. She needs to show Alma kindness instead of violence.

== Cast ==
- Roser Rendon Ena as Jessica
- Rasvely Lissette Donaire Restituyo as Alma
- Yaneys Cabrera Ramírez as Mother
- Leisam Ramos Rodríguez as Naty
- Ana Barja as Caritas worker
- Nora Guarro Molina as Jessica's friend
- Evelyn Lissette Restituyo Niva as Hairdresser

== Production ==
Development

In her interview, Lucía G. Romero told the development of the film as:

Cura sana was born with the character of Jessica, who began to haunt my mind almost from the moment I started studying film at university. I wanted to tell the story of a girl who, although she seems strong and fearless, is afraid of being vulnerable and letting her guard down because of her experience with abuse and how it affects her life and his relationships. Inspired by my story and that of my family, I began to explore the psychological consequences that abuse leaves on its victims, particularly suffering from it from a young age and how to break the generational curse of violence. Cura Sana is a story about the consequences of violence and how it's never too late to choose love.

She told in the interview that they rehearsed the roles with the lead cast for four months. She said, "We played role-playing games and rehearsed one scene per day, which allowed them to make the script their own and improvise certain scenes each time."

Filming

The director was Inspired by Sean Baker's 2017 film The Florida Project, to visually represent vibrant and exciting adolescence and childhood in Spain. She elaborated "Visually, the colors and information overload in the image helped me generate this idealized, subjective view of how girls see the world."

== Release ==
Cura sana had its World premiere on 19 February 2024, as part of the 74th Berlin International Film Festival, in Generation 14plus.

The film competed in Fiction Short Films Official Competition at the 27th Málaga Film Festival that took place from 1 to 10 March 2024.

The film was also screened in 'Future Frames: Generation Next of European Cinema' at the 58th Karlovy Vary International Film Festival on 2 July 2024.

== Reception ==
Lida Bach reviewing in Movie Break rated the film 6.5/10 and wrote, "The short film captures the feelings in [protagonists] nuanced facial expressions and skillfully establishes the psychological parallels between the two." Bach felt that "The skyscraper backdrop does not appear to be a criminal cliché, but rather a haven of interpersonal cohesion."

== Accolades ==
The film was selected in Shortcat, the program for the international promotion of Catalan short films by Catalan Films. It was one of 6 short films chosen from more than 60 productions presented.

Award	Date	Category	Recipient	Result	Ref.
Berlin International Film Festival	25 February 2024	Crystal Bear for the Best Short Film	Lucía G. Romero	Won	
Málaga Film Festival	10 March 2024	Silver Biznaga for Best Actress in a Leading Role (Ex aequo)	Roser Rendon Ena and Rasvely Lissette Donaire Restituyo	Won	
The Lanzarote International Film Festival	7 June 2024	Best National Short Fiction	Cura Sana – Lucía G Romero	Won	
Palm Springs International Festival of Short Films	29 June 2025	Best Student International Short	Cura Sana – Lucía G Romero	Won	
