= Betânia =

2024 Brazilian film

- Theatrical release poster
- Directed by: Marcelo Botta
- Written by: Marcelo Botta
- Produced by: Gabriel Di Giacomo; Marcelo Botta
- Starring: Diana Mattos; Tião Carvalho
- Cinematography: Bruno Graziano
- Edited by: Márcio Hashimoto
- Music by: Marcelo Botta; Tião Carvalho; Edivaldo Marquita; Misael Pereira; Henrique Menezes; A Barca
- Production company: Salvatore Filmes
- Distributed by: MPM Premium
- Release date: 18 February 2024 (Berlinale)
- Running time: 120 minutes
- Country: Brazil
- Languages: Portuguese; French

Betânia is a 2024 Brazilian drama film written and directed by Marcelo Botta in his feature directorial debut. The film, starring Diana Mattos, revolves around Betânia 65, a stalwart family matriarch, who is on a turbulent ride on the ever-shifting sands of time.

It was selected in the Panorama section at the 74th Berlin International Film Festival and was screened on 18 February 2024. Marcelo Botta, the first feature director was nominated for GWFF Best First Feature Award in the festival.

== Synopsis ==
After losing her husband, Betânia, a 65-year-old family matriarch, is convinced by her daughters to return to her birthplace, where her relatives still reside. The village is located near the Lençóis Maranhenses National Park’s sandy landscape in Maranhão, a Brazilian state that has recently become arid and is close to the Amazon. Betânia abandons her simple, rural life without electricity and enters a world where old and new clash. Driven by the ancient music of Maranhão, Betânia and her family struggle to preserve their identity. Life prevails, as it always does, despite the challenges of the towering sand dunes, contaminated water, economic difficulties and family conflicts.

== Cast ==
- Diana Mattos as Betânia
- Tião Carvalho as Ribamar
- Caçula Rodrigues as Tonhão
- Nádia D’Cássia as Vitória
- Ulysses Azevedo as Antonio Filho
- Michelle Cabral as Irineusa
- Vitão Santiago as Xambim
- Enme Paixão as DJ Kaya

== Production ==
Set in the sand dunes of Lençois in Northern Brazil, the film is bank rolled by Salvatore Filmes.

== Release ==
Betânia had its world premiere on 18 February 2024, as part of the 74th Berlin International Film Festival, in Panorama.

In December 2023, Paris-based MPM Premium has acquired the sales rights of the film prior to its Berlinale premiere.

== Reception ==
Stephen Saito reviewing for Moveable Fest at Berlinale wrote, "While the film is more inclined to chase their vitality than to adhere to some more traditional structure, much like the characters themselves, “Betânia” finds the rewards in that experience."

== Accolades ==
Award	Date	Category	Recipient	Result	Ref.
Berlin International Film Festival	25 February 2024	Panorama Audience Award for Best Feature Film	Marcelo Botta	Nominated	
Berlin International Film Festival	25 February 2024	GWFF Best First Feature Award	Marcelo Botta	Nominated	
Berlin International Film Festival	25 February 2024	Teddy Award for Best Feature Film	Marcelo Botta	Nominated	
