= Drained =

2006 film directed by Heitor Dhalia

- Directed by: Heitor Dhalia
- Written by: Marçal Aquino; Heitor Dhalia; Lourenço Mutarelli (novel)
- Produced by: Heitor Dhalia; Joana Mariani; Marcelo Doria; Matias Mariani; Rodrigo Teixeira
- Starring: Selton Mello; Paula Braun; Lourenço Mutarelli; Sílvia Lourenço; Lorena Lobato; Alice Braga
- Release dates: September 27, 2006 (Rio Film Festival); March 23, 2007 (Brazil)
- Running time: 112 minutes
- Country: Brazil
- Language: Portuguese

Drained, (Portuguese: O Cheiro do Ralo) is a 2006 Brazilian dark comedy film based on a novel by Lourenço Mutarelli. It was directed by Heitor Dhalia, and stars Selton Mello. The film was produced by Geração Conteúdo, Primo Filmes & RT Features.

== Plot ==
Lourenço is a lonely pawn shop owner whose work made him insensitive to the suffering of those who desperately seek to sell him their personal possessions. Lourenço's insensitivity causes him to deal with the world as a collection of objects to be bought. He begins to play power games with his customers and derives pleasure from it.

Lourenço narrates the movie, and throughout the plot, he reveals his growing lust for power. The literal name of the movie ("The Smell from the Drain") refers to the persistent bad odor that comes from the restroom in Lourenço's office. Lourenço's lust for power is symbolized by this very scent. He slowly comes to realize that the stench from the drain actually comes from him.

Lourenço's life changes when he becomes infatuated with a local waitress, whose physical attributes become yet another object to him, and as with any other object, he desires to possess her. In the end, destruction prevails.

== Festival career ==
- Rio de Janeiro International Film Festival
  - Best Latin American Film (FIPRESCI award)
  - Special Jury Award
  - Best Actor (Selton Mello)
- Mostra BR - São Paulo International Film Festival
  - Best Film (Bandeira Paulista Award)
  - Critic Award
  - Special Mention to the Film's Cast
- International Competition at the 2007 Sundance Film Festival
