= Henry Fonda for President =

Austrian-German essay film

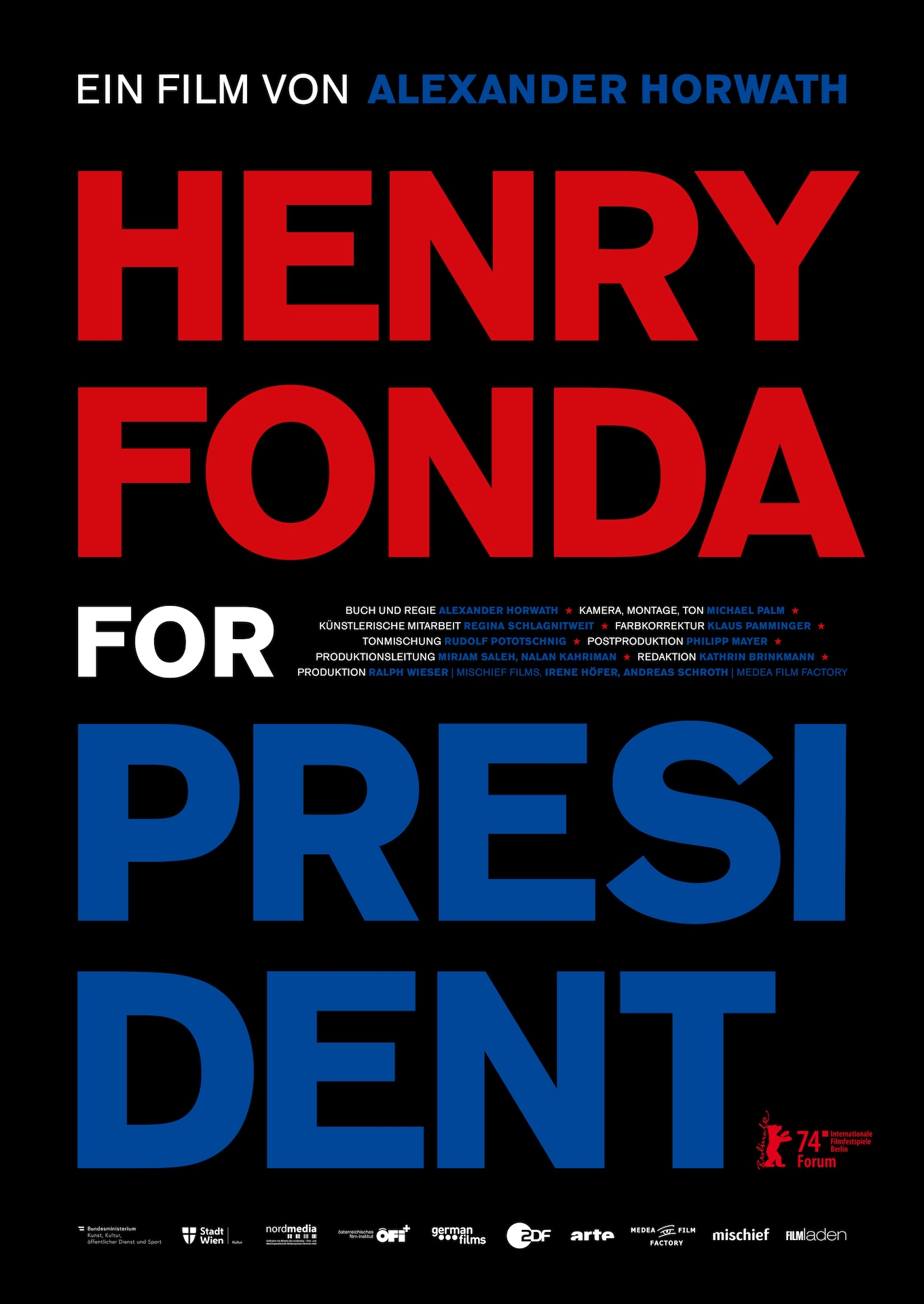
- Film poster
- Directed by: Alexander Horwath
- Written by: Alexander Horwath
- Produced by: Ralph Wieser (Mischief Films, Austria), Irene Höfer, Andreas Schroth (Medea Film Factory)
- Cinematography: Michael Palm
- Edited by: Michael Palm
- Distributed by: World: Sixpackfilm; US: The Film Desk
- Release date: 2024
- Running time: 184 minutes
- Countries: Austria; Germany
- Languages: English; German

Henry Fonda for President is a 2024 essay film by Alexander Horwath. Horwath created the project in close cooperation with Regina Schlagnitweit (artistic collaborator and researcher) and Michael Palm (cinematography, sound, and editing). The film premiered at the 2024 Berlin International Film Festival in the Forum section and received several awards at international film festivals. In the annual critics poll of Sight and Sound magazine, it was voted among the "Best Films of 2024".

== Synopsis ==
The film presents two parallel narratives. Drawing from the biography and screen lives of American actor Henry Fonda (1905–1982), filmmaker Alexander Horwath also creates a historical panorama of the United States, tracing from Fonda's Dutch ancestors' arrival in the 17th century to the present day.

The film includes footage shot across several locations in the United States (Albany, Omaha, Grand Island, New York, Tuckahoe, New Salem, Tombstone, Fort Apache, Fonda, NY, among others) and archival material: film clips, historical film and audio documents, paintings, and photographs. History, popular culture, politics, and Horwath's reflections, which he presents in a voice-over text, are intertwined in the film. The film also features Henry Fonda's voice, drawn from a long interview conducted by journalist Lawrence Grobel in 1981, near the end of Fonda's life.

== Production and release ==
The film was produced with support from the Austrian Ministry for Culture, the Vienna Cultural Department, Nordmedia, and in collaboration with ZDF/Arte. The world premiere took place on 19 February 2024 at Berlin's Delphi-Kino in the framework of the 2024 Berlin International Film Festival. The film was nominated for the Berlinale Documentary Award and was presented in the Forum section. Over the following months, it was invited to 40 international film festivals and received several awards. Theatrical releases followed in 2025: on 10 January in Austria, on 30 January in Germany and on 3 April in the United States. A distinct 56-minute TV version, entitled Henry Fonda – Der Präsident der Namenlosen (transl. Henry Fonda – President of the Nameless), was broadcast on 3 November 2024 and on 17 February 2025 on the Arte channel.

== Reception and legacy ==
The film was widely and very positively reviewed in the English-language world as well as in Germany and Austria. Critics in other countries were equally impressed by the film, especially in the Spanish-language world, but also in Italy, Portugal, the Netherlands, Russia, and Slovenia, where the cultural critic Marcel Štefančič called it "the film of the year".

In the annual Critic's Poll conducted by the British magazine Sight & Sound, Henry Fonda for President was voted among the Best Films of 2024. In the international year-end poll of Con los ojos abiertos in Argentina it was ranked No. 1 among the First Films of the Year and No. 7 among the Films of the Year.

In the US magazine Film Comment, Henry Fonda for President is rated No. 16 in their poll Best Films of 2025.

J. Hoberman in Artforum calls the film "a masterpiece of applied cinephilia (...) Fonda as landmark: Learned but never pedantic, Horwath finds him at strategic junctures in the American past, provides a Tocquevillian tour of historic sites, and links Fonda's biography to his movies."

Glen Kenny concurs in his 'Critic's Pick' for The New York Times: "These connections have plentiful entertainment value, but Horwath knows they signify more than just trivia: Their threads make up the fabric of American culture, such as it is."

A.S. Hamrah proposes in Screen Slate that the film "is at least three things: a study of Fonda's career, a social history of his films as they relate to developments in American history from the 18th century to the present, and a clear-eyed, coast-to-coast travelogue by a European, in the tradition of Alexis de Tocqueville and Jean Baudrillard. It succeeds in all three, its three-hour running time breezing by in rich detail that combines scenes from real landscapes and towns in which Fonda's films took place, with excursions into Omaha, where he grew up."

For the critic Flavia Dima, Henry Fonda for President is "one of the event films of this decade, combining the archive and the immediate image, the absence and the presence, the past and the present, with much formal elegance."

For the Spanish critic José Luis Loza it is "the monumental film of the [2024 Berlinale] edition. The one for which this festival will be remembered because it will leave an immanent record in memory."

Kieron Corless in Sight & Sound notes that "this transfixing gem of an essay film (...) is as much a portrait of America as of Fonda, with Horwath forging intricate connections to reveal how the actor's work and life intersect with and illuminate key moments in US history." Elsa Fernández-Santos in El País sees a similar connection: "Spanning over three hours, Austrian author Alexander Horwath's debut film delivers an admirable X-ray of the United States. (...) His vision is compelling – in a year in which Donald Trump could return to the White House, with unforeseeable consequences for the world."

Jordan Cronk in Film Comment argues that "Horwath isn't out to critique U.S. policy so much as survey the impression those policies left on the cinema of the era and the man who, for many, came to be seen as a symbol of the nation's conscience."

In the conservative National Review Armond White suggests a different reading of the film's politics: "The monumental Henry Fonda for President doc is an all-American political epic. Both fascinating and infuriating, [it] examines the dark-browed, blue-eyed stoic Hollywood actor Henry Fonda as more politically significant than his infamously radical daughter, Jane. Yet Henry Fonda for President itself is a work of leftist radicalism."

Brad Hanford in Slant Magazine focuses on the film's critique of image-making: "Among Horwath's achievements is the unity of thought he maintains despite his expansive, kaleidoscopic approach. Far from a trivial cataloging of coincidences, the myriad echoes between art and history are used to build a deeply considered critique of the Hollywood machine's ideological underpinnings, of the real forces behind the images that machine produces."

== Awards ==
- 2024: Special Jury Prize at BAFICI – Buenos Aires International Independent Film Festival in the section Avant-Garde & Genre, Buenos Aires, Argentina
- 2024: Chantal Akerman Award at the Jerusalem Film Festival, Jerusalem, Israel
- 2024: Time of History Special Award at SEMINCI – Valladolid International Film Festival, Valladolid, Spain
- 2024: Audience Award at the I mille occhi Festival, Trieste, Trieste, Italy
- 2024: Special Award of the Official Jury at Cineuropa Film Festival, Santiago de Compostela, Santiago de Compostela, Spain
- 2025: Award for Best Editing in a Documentary at Diagonale; Graz, Austria
