= Hard Labor (film) =

2011 film

- Film poster
- Directed by: Juliana Rojas; Marco Dutra
- Written by: Juliana Rojas; Marco Dutra
- Produced by: Sara Silveira
- Starring: Helena Albergaria
- Cinematography: Matheus Rocha
- Edited by: Caetano Gotardo
- Production companies: Dezenove Som; Imagens Produções
- Distributed by: Polifilmes
- Release dates: 12 May 2011 (Cannes); 30 September 2011 (Brazil)
- Running time: 100 minutes
- Country: Brazil
- Language: Portuguese
- Budget: R$2 million
- Box office: R$68,691 ($31,046)

Hard Labor (Portuguese: Trabalhar Cansa) is 2011 Brazilian drama film directed by Juliana Rojas and Marco Dutra. It premiered in the Un Certain Regard section at the 2011 Cannes Film Festival. It was shot in São Paulo, Paulínia, and Campinas, all cities of the state of São Paulo.

== Cast ==
- Helena Albergaria as Helena
- Marat Descartes as Otávio
- Naloana Lima as Paula
- Gilda Nomacce as Gilda
- Marina Flores as Vanessa
- Lilian Blanc as Inês
- Thiago Carreira as Ricardo
- Hugo Villavicenzio as Jorge

== Festivals & Awards ==
- Official Selection - Un Certain Regard, Cannes Film Festival, 2011.
- Havana Star Prize - Best Screenplay, Havana Film Festival New York, 2012.
