= Cidade; Campo =

2024 drama film by Juliana Rojas

- promotional poster
- Directed by: Juliana Rojas
- Screenplay by: Juliana Rojas
- Produced by: Sara Silveira; Maria Ionescu; Clement Duboin; Ingmar Trost
- Starring: Fernanda Vianna; Mirella Façanha
- Cinematography: Cris Lyra; Alice Andrade Drummond
- Edited by: Cristinal Amaral
- Music by: Maria Ionescu
- Production companies: Dezenove Som e Imagens; Sutor Kolonko; Good Fortune Films
- Distributed by: The Open Reel
- Release date: 19 February 2024 (Berlinale)
- Running time: 119 minutes
- Countries: Brazil; Germany; France
- Language: Portuguese

Cidade; Campo is a 2024 drama film directed by Juliana Rojas. Starring Fernanda Vianna, Mirella Façanha and Bruna Linzmeyer, the film tells two tales of migration between the city and the countryside. In first tale: Joana moves to São Paulo and tries to restart her life, after a disaster floods her land. In the second tale: Flavia moves to farm in the country with her wife Mara, following the death of her estranged father.

The film, a co-production between Brazil, Germany and France production companies, was selected in the Encounters at the 74th Berlin International Film Festival, where it had its world premiere on 19 February 2024.

== Synopsis ==
The film tells two tales of migration; one from country side to city and the other from city to country side.

In the first tale: Rural worker Joana relocates to São Paulo in search of her sister Tania and her grandson Jaime, after her hometown is devastated by floods. In the bustling city, Joana grapples with the challenges of precarious employment. Joining a cleaning company, she forms connections with her colleagues who collectively strive for better working conditions. Simultaneously, her bond with young Jaime stirs memories of her missing son.

In the second tale: Flavia and her wife Mara move to a farm after Flavia's estranged father's death. In the wilderness, they struggle to start anew. As they inhabit the abandoned farmhouse, Flavia uncovers hidden facets of her father's life. However, the harsh realities of rural existence shock the couple. Amidst the surrounding woods, Flavia begins to suspect something mysterious. Nature compels them to confront old memories and ghosts.

== Cast ==
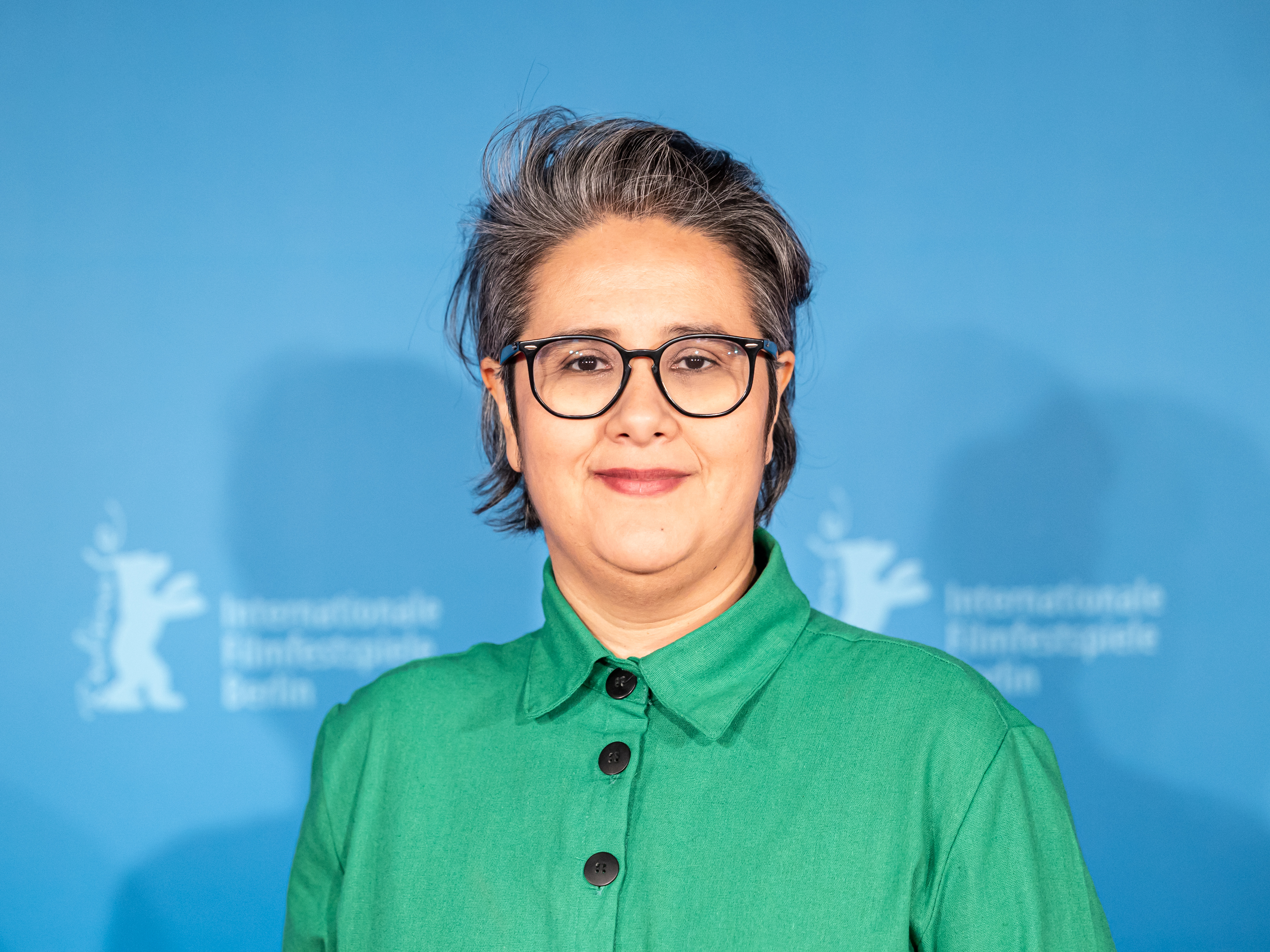
Juliana Rojas in 2024

- Fernanda Vianna as Joana
- Mirella Façanha as Flavia
- Bruna Linzmeyer as Mara
- Kalleb Oliveira as Jaime
- Andrea Marquee as Tânia
- Preta Ferreira as Ângela
- Marcos de Andrade as Celino
- Nilcéia Vicente as Dirce

== Production ==
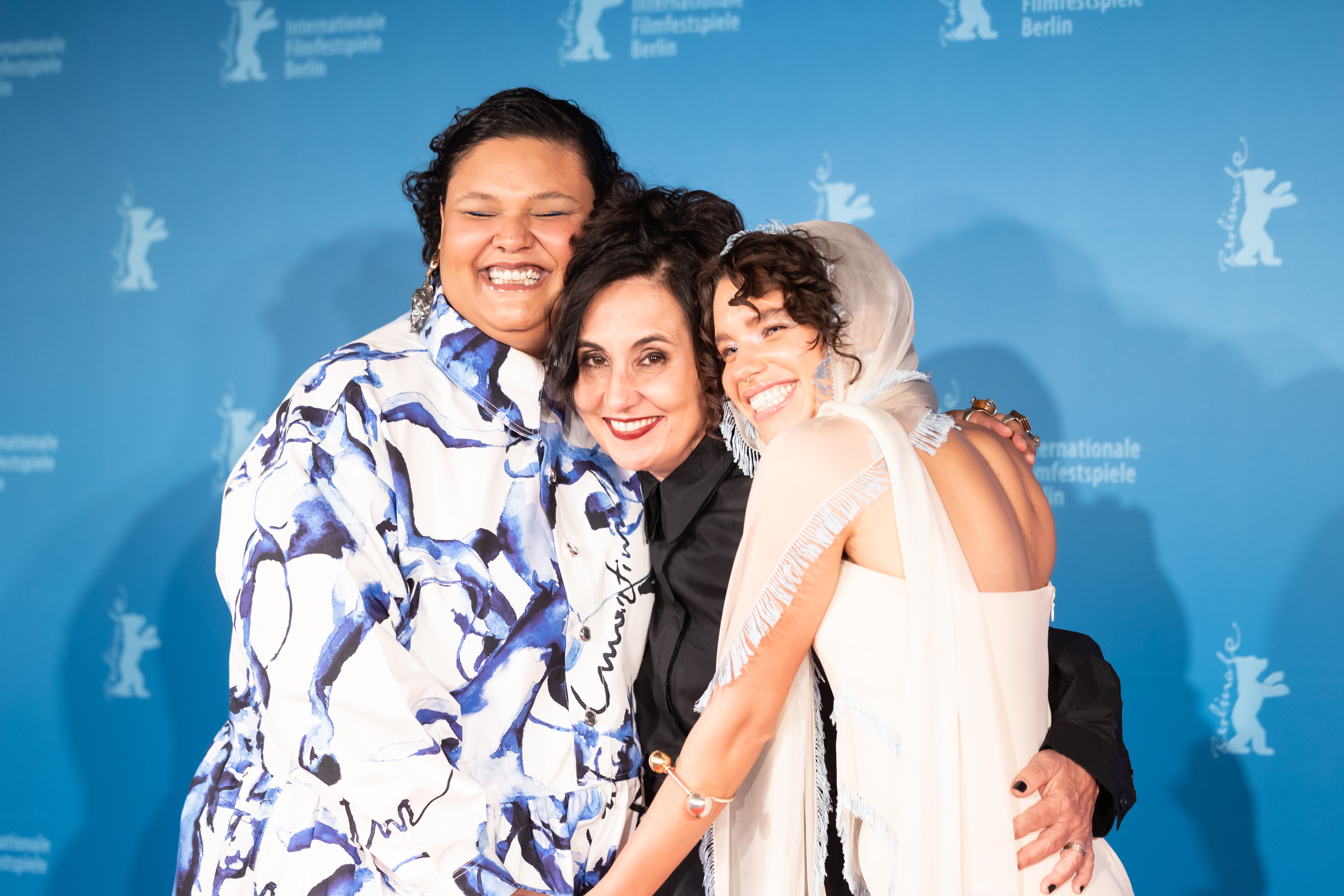
Cast of the film

The film was produced by Dezenove Som e Imagens in co-production with Sutor Kolonko e. K. and Good Fortune Films.

The film was bankrolled by FSA – BRDE, SP Cine, Film- und Medienstiftung NRW, Paradiso Prize, Locarno Gioventu Prize. It was also supported by World Cinema Fund, which was launched in 2004 on the initiative of the Federal Cultural Foundation and the Berlinale, and is one of twelve films invited to Berlinale.

Cidade; Campo was shot in Brazil.

== Release ==
Cidade; Campo had its world premiere on 19 February 2024, as part of the 74th Berlin International Film Festival, in Encounters.

The film was selected in Latin Horizons (Horizontes Latinos) at 72nd San Sebastián International Film Festival, where it was screened on 20 September 2024. It will also be presented in 'Strands: Dare' thematic section of the 2024 BFI London Film Festival on 9 October 2024.

== Reception ==
=== Critical response ===
Olivia Popp reviewing the film at Berlinale for Cineuropa wrote, "Unfolding like a dialogue between its diptychal parts, the film's slowness is its strength, with a meditative but never dragging pace easing the viewer into contemplation between the stories that, by themselves, would feel unfinished."

=== Accolades ===
Award	Date of ceremony	Category	Recipient	Result	Ref.
Berlin International Film Festival	25 February 2024	Encounters: Best Director	Juliana Rojas	Won	
Berlin International Film Festival	25 February 2024	Teddy Award for Best Feature Film	Juliana Rojas	Nominated	
