= Good Manners (2017 film) =

2017 film by Marco Dutra and Juliana Rojas

- Theatrical release poster
- Portuguese: As Boas Maneiras
- Directed by: Juliana Rojas; Marco Dutra
- Written by: Juliana Rojas; Marco Dutra
- Produced by: Sara Silveira; Maria Ionescu; Clément Duboin; Frédéric Corvez
- Starring: Isabél Zuaa; Marjorie Estiano; Miguel Lobo; Cida Moreira
- Cinematography: Rui Poças
- Edited by: Caetano Gotardo
- Music by: Guilherme Garbato; Gustavo Garbato
- Production companies: Dezenove Som e Imagem; Good Fortune Films; Urban Factory
- Distributed by: Imovision (Brazil); Jour2Fête (France)
- Release dates: 6 August 2017 (Locarno); 21 March 2018 (France); 7 June 2018 (Brazil)
- Running time: 135 minutes
- Countries: Brazil; France
- Language: Portuguese
- Box office: $35,714

Good Manners (Portuguese: As Boas Maneiras) is a 2017 dark fantasy horror film written and directed by Juliana Rojas and Marco Dutra, starring Isabél Zuaa, Marjorie Estiano, Miguel Lobo and Cida Moreira.

The film follows a woman named Clara who takes a job as a housekeeper and nanny for a wealthy woman, only to realize that the job and the pregnancy are more complicated than she initially believed.

The film premiered at the 70th Locarno International Film Festival, where it won the Special Jury Prize. It was released in France on 21 March 2018 by Jour2Fête and in Brazil on 7 June 2018 by Imovision.

== Plot ==
Clara interviews for a nanny job despite having no experience or references. Just as she is about to be turned down for the job, the woman interviewing her, Ana, experiences cramping. A sympathetic Clara guides her through the pain, and Ana decides to hire her as a live-in housekeeper and future nanny.

On her 29th birthday, Ana gets drunk and reveals to Clara that she is estranged from her family. Originally engaged to a man, she cheated on him and conceived a child from her affair. Her parents sent her to the city to have an abortion, but they severed ties with her after she refused to go through with it.

Ana is ordered by her doctors not to consume meat. One night, Clara finds her rifling through the fridge. When Clara tries to guide her to bed, Ana kisses her but then scratches her hard enough to draw blood. The following morning, Ana does not appear to remember the incident.

Clara realizes that the incident might be connected to the full moon. The following full moon, Ana passionately kisses Clara and the two have sex. Later that night, Ana sleepwalks again. Clara witnesses her murdering and eating a cat. The following day, Clara tells Ana about her sleepwalking. She also puts some of her blood into Ana's meal to relieve her thirst for blood and sleepwalking.

On the following full moon night, Ana's cramping worsens. Before Clara can call for help, Ana's stomach ruptures. She dies, and Clara sees that the surviving baby is a werewolf pup. Clara runs away and tries to abandon the baby, but changes her mind on the latter upon hearing the child's cries and decides to adopt him, naming him Joel as Ana wished.

Seven years later, Clara works as a nurse and has been fostering Joel as her own, raising him as a vegetarian and chaining him up in what is known as the “Little Bedroom" during full moons. After Clara's landlady Dona Amélia gives Joel meat one day, he searches through Clara's things, where he uncovers a photo of Ana, becoming hostile with Clara and even transforming during an argument with her. The next morning, Clara reluctantly admits that Ana is his birth mother, but insists that she does not know who his father is.

Joel decides to search for his father, the only clue being a receipt from a shopping mall where Ana bought shoes. He and his friend Maurício go to the mall, but they are locked in when they decide to stay inside past closing time. Joel transforms under a full moon and soon after pursues Maurício to eat him whole.

Joel returns home alone before unconsciously transfiguring back, but as he retains excess hair and claws, Amélia discovers his secret when finding him with Clara and wants to perform an exorcism on him. Clara injects the landlady with an anesthetic and then plans to run away with Joel the next day, although he does not fully remember his actions in wolf form.

After locking her in the Little Bedroom in a fit of confusion and anger, Joel tries to attend a dance with his classmate Amanda later that night. There, he quickly realizes his true form and begs Amanda to leave before he once again turns. Clara, having managed to escape with help from a co-worker, shoots him in the leg before he can kill Amanda, non-fatally injuring him.

Clara takes Joel home to the Little Bedroom and removes the bullet, healing the wound. Meanwhile, a petrified Amanda tells the locals what happened, leading them to hunt Joel down, tracking down his and Clara's apartment. Amélia wakes up and watches a rioting mob of the locals with Amanda, both with implicit regret. With a lullaby Ana sang earlier in the film, Clara manages to tame Joel so that he does not attack her. She finally decides that she cannot keep him locked up and hungry. As the mob bang on the door, Clara and Joel prepare to face them together as Joel lets out one final howl.

== Cast ==
- Isabél Zuaa as Clara
- Marjorie Estiano as Ana
- Miguel Lobo as Joel
- Cida Moreira as Dona Amélia
- Andréa Marquee as Ângela
- Felipe Kenji as Maurício
- Nina Medeiros as Amanda
- Neusa Velasco as Dona Norma
- Gilda Nomacce as Gilda

== Reception ==
The film received a score of 96% on review aggregator site Rotten Tomatoes and a 73 from Metacritic indicating positive reviews.
