= Butterfly (2024 film) =

Animated short film by Florence Miailhe

Butterfly (French: Papillon) is a French animated short film written and directed by Florence Miailhe. The story is inspired by the life of the French-Algerian swimmer and holocaust survivor Alfred Nakache.

The film premiered in the Generation Kplus program at the 74th Berlin International Film Festival in 2024, where it won the Crystal Bear for Best Short Film. It was subsequently screened at the 2024 Annecy International Animation Film Festival, where it won the André Martin Award for Best French Short Film. It was a César Award nominee for Best Animated Short Film at the 50th César Awards in 2025, and an Academy Award nominee for Best Animated Short Film at the 98th Academy Awards in 2026.
