= Lapse (film) =

2023 Brazilian short film

- Official release poster
- Portuguese: Lapso
- Directed by: Caroline Cavalcanti
- Screenplay by: Caroline Cavalcanti
- Produced by: Kelly Maciel
- Starring: Beatriz Oliveira; Juan Queiroz
- Cinematography: Raquel Junquiera; Gustavo Braga
- Edited by: Raquel Junquiera; Gustavo Braga
- Music by: Jovemlukaz; Iza Sabino
- Production company: Fuskazul Filmes
- Release dates: 24 August 2023 (Festival International de Curtas Metagens de São Paulo); 20 February 2024 (Berlinale)
- Running time: 25 minutes
- Country: Brazil
- Language: Portuguese

Lapse (Portuguese: Lapso) is a 2023 Brazilian short drama film written and directed by Caroline Cavalcanti. It tells the story of Bel and Juliano, two teenagers living in the suburbs of Belo Horizonte in Brazil. Bel, who is turning 18, is deaf and faces the challenges of communication by sign language.

It was selected in the Generation 14plus section at the 74th Berlin International Film Festival, where it had its European premiere on 20 February and got special mention in Crystal Bear for the Best Short Film award from jury.

== Synopsis ==
Bel and Juliano, both teenagers residing in the suburbs of Belo Horizonte, Brazil, find themselves connected after getting caught in acts of vandalism. Their paths intersect while fulfilling a social-educational measure at the same public library. Bel, who is turning 18, grapples with communication challenges due to her deafness. She stands out with her skateboarding skills and artistic drawings, capturing Juliano's attention. Juliano, deeply passionate about rap music, documents his daily life through audio recordings. He confides in Bel, sharing his anxieties, emotions, and uncertainties about life's purpose. Together, they navigate shared experiences of repression by state authorities, gradually forming a bond and discovering ways to resist the harsh realities they face, as well as the system's indifference and neglect.

== Cast ==
- Beatriz Oliveira as Bel
- Juan Queiroz as Juliano
- Dora Rosa as Dôra
- Thayanne Lima as Laura
- Adrilene Muradas Nunes
- Camila Morena da Lu
- Gabriela Veloso
- Giovanna Miranda
- Isabela Leão Moreira
- Letícia Alves
- Laurês Leão Moreira
- Luiz Gonzaga
- Barbosa Moreira

== Release ==
Lapse had its premiere at the Festival International de Curtas Metagens de São Paulo on 24 August 2023.

It had its European premiere on 20 February 2024, as part of the 74th Berlin International Film Festival, in Generation 14plus.

The film was screened at the Tiradent Film Festival on January 21, 2024.

== Accolades ==
| Award | Date | Category | Recipient | Result | Ref. |
|---|---|---|---|---|---|
| Festival Internacional de Curtas de São Paulo | 1 September 2023 | Canal Brasil Short Film Award | Lapse | Won | |
| Kinoarte Film Festival | 19 November 2023 | Best director | Caroline Cavalcanti | Won | |
| Kinoarte Film Festival | 19 November 2023 | Jury popular | Lapse | Won | |
| Berlin International Film Festival | 25 February 2024 | Crystal Bear for the Best Short Film: Special Mention | Caroline Cavalcanti | Won | |
