= Gernot Wieland =

Gernot Wieland is an emeritus professor at the University of British Columbia, who specializes in the Anglo-Saxon period, specifically glosses in Anglo-Saxon manuscripts, relations between Anglo-Saxon scholars and their continental counterparts, and the Latin literature written by Anglo-Saxons.

Wieland's 1983 The Latin Glosses on Arator and Prudentius established a typology of glosses. In 2017 Brepols published a Festschrift in his honor, Teaching and Learning in Medieval Europe.
