= Sarvnaz Alambeigi =

Iranian documentary filmmaker

Sarvnaz Alambeigi سروناز علم بیگی
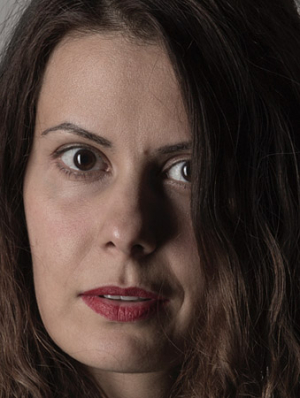
- Born: Tehran, Iran
- Education: Islamic Azad University, Central Tehran Branch
- Occupations: Filmmaker; director; producer; poet; painter
- Years active: 2000–present

Sarvnaz Alambeigi (Persian: سروناز علم بیگی born in Tehran, Iran) is an Iranian documentary film director, painter, and poet. Her most notable works are 1001 Nights Apart and Maydegol.

== Early life and education ==
Sarvnaz Alambeigi was born in the city of Tehran. She received her Bachelor of Arts degree in painting from the Faculty of Arts and Architecture, Islamic Azad University, Central Tehran Branch. She began her artistic career in 2000 with her first painting exhibition, and from 2013 to 2018, she received film training through specialized courses and international film labs. She is a member of the European International Documentary Association, Germany’s Directors Association. She has also served as a jury member at several international film festivals, including the Osnabrück Film Festival and Sunny Side of the Doc.

== Career ==
In June 2017, her short film Cypher And Lion (Noghteh Va Shir) was released at the Tehran Museum of Contemporary Art after the opening ceremony for "The Lions of Iran" exhibit by Tanavoli in 2017. The plot depicts the decline of Iran's sculptural culture and its revival after centuries by Parviz Tanavoli, the father of modern Iranian sculpture.

Alambeigi's most notable works include Maydegol and 1001 Nights Apart. 1001 Nights Apart was released in Germany in 2022 and won the VFF Documentary Film Production Award at the Munich International Documentary Film Festival in May 2022.

Maydegol premiered on 18 February 2024 at the 74th Berlin International Film Festival, where she received a Special Mention from the jury in the Generation section. Maydegol, tells the story of a teenage Afghan refugee living in Iran who strives to pursue her dream of becoming a Muay Thai boxer despite social injustice and violence outside the ring.

== Notable works ==
=== Documentary Films ===
Year	Name	Genre	Credit	Awards
2013	The Second Room	Short/Documentary	Director/producer	
2017	Tomorrowland	Documentary	Writer/director/producer	
2017	Cypher And Lion	Documentary	Director	
2022	1001 Nights Apart	Documentary	Writer/director/producer	The VFF Documentary Film Produktion Award at DOK.fest Munich
2024	Maydegol	Documentary	Writer/director/producer	

=== Publications ===
- There Between Two Worlds, her first novella, was published by Ettefagh Publications in 2020.
- Stork and Snow, her poetry book, was published by Nazar Publishing in 2023.

=== Exhibitions ===
- Conversation, a performance and a solo artwork exhibited in October 2015 at Shirin Gallery, Tehran.
- The Diary, a solo artwork exhibited in October 2021 at Etemad 1 Gallery, Tehran.
- Stork and Snow, group exhibition in 2023 at O Gallery.
- Some Isles Some Places, group exhibition in 2025 with Stefan Ettlinger, at Martin Leyer-Pritzkow Ausstellungen, Düsseldorf.

== See also ==
- Iranian Revolution
- Cinema of Iran
- Masoud Sekhavatdoust
