= Juliana Rojas =

Brazilian filmmaker (born 1981)

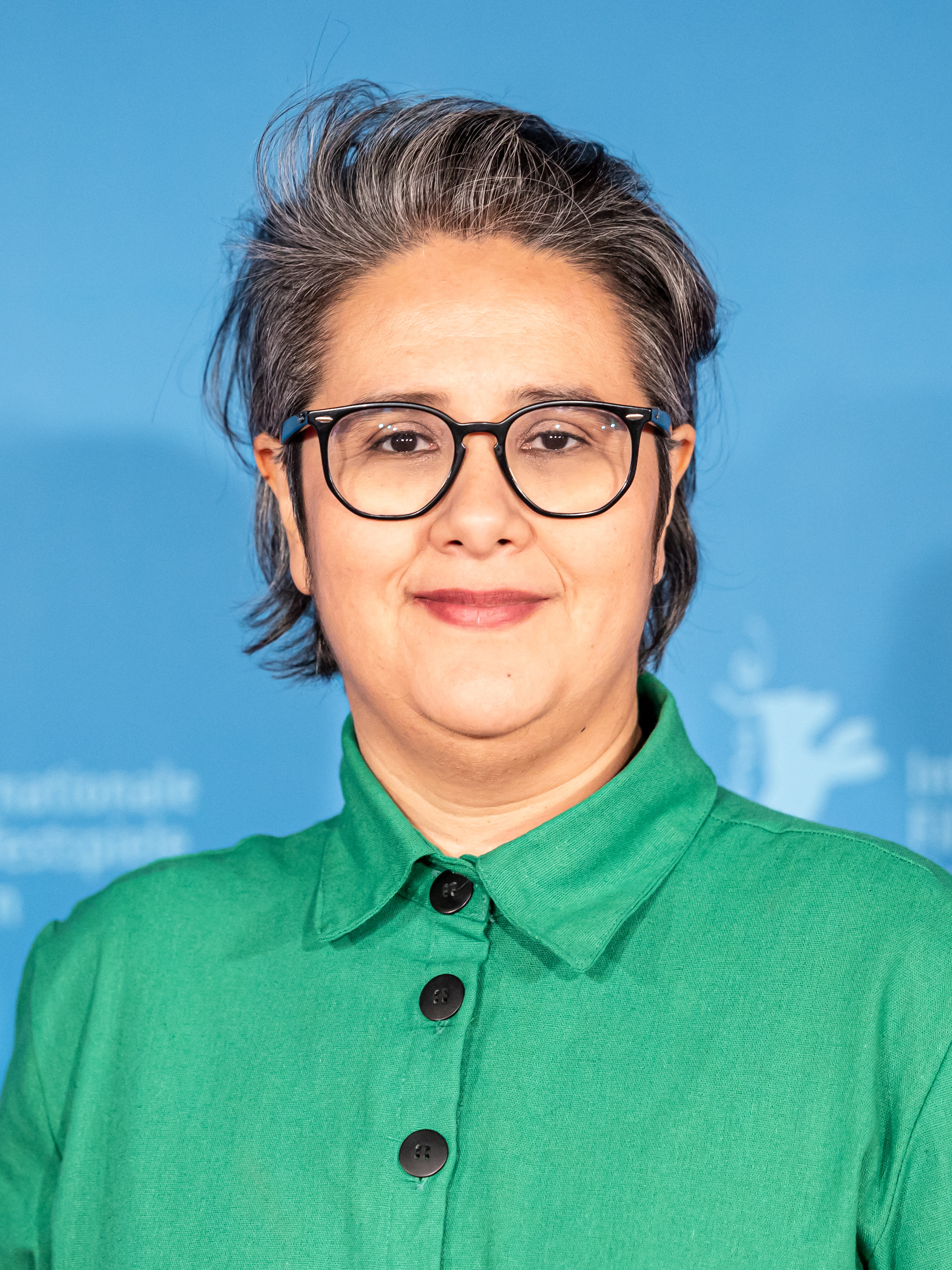
- Juliana Rojas at Berlinale 2024
- Born: 23 June 1981 (age 45); Campinas, São Paulo, Brazil
- Education: School of Communications and Arts, University of São Paulo
- Occupations: Director and Editor
- Years active: 2004 - present
- Notable work: Hard Labor

Juliana Rojas is a Brazilian filmmaker and editor born in Campinas, São Paulo (June 23, 1981). She graduated in Cinema in School of Communication and Arts of University of São Paulo (Escola de Comunicação e Artes da USP).

In 2011, her first feature film Hard Labor had its world premiere at the Un Certain Regard section of the 2011 Cannes Film Festival. Her film, Good Manners won the Silver Leopard at the 2017 Locarno Film Festival. In 2024, her latest film Cidade; Campo, won the Best Director award at the Encounters section of the 74th Berlin International Film Festival.

== Career ==
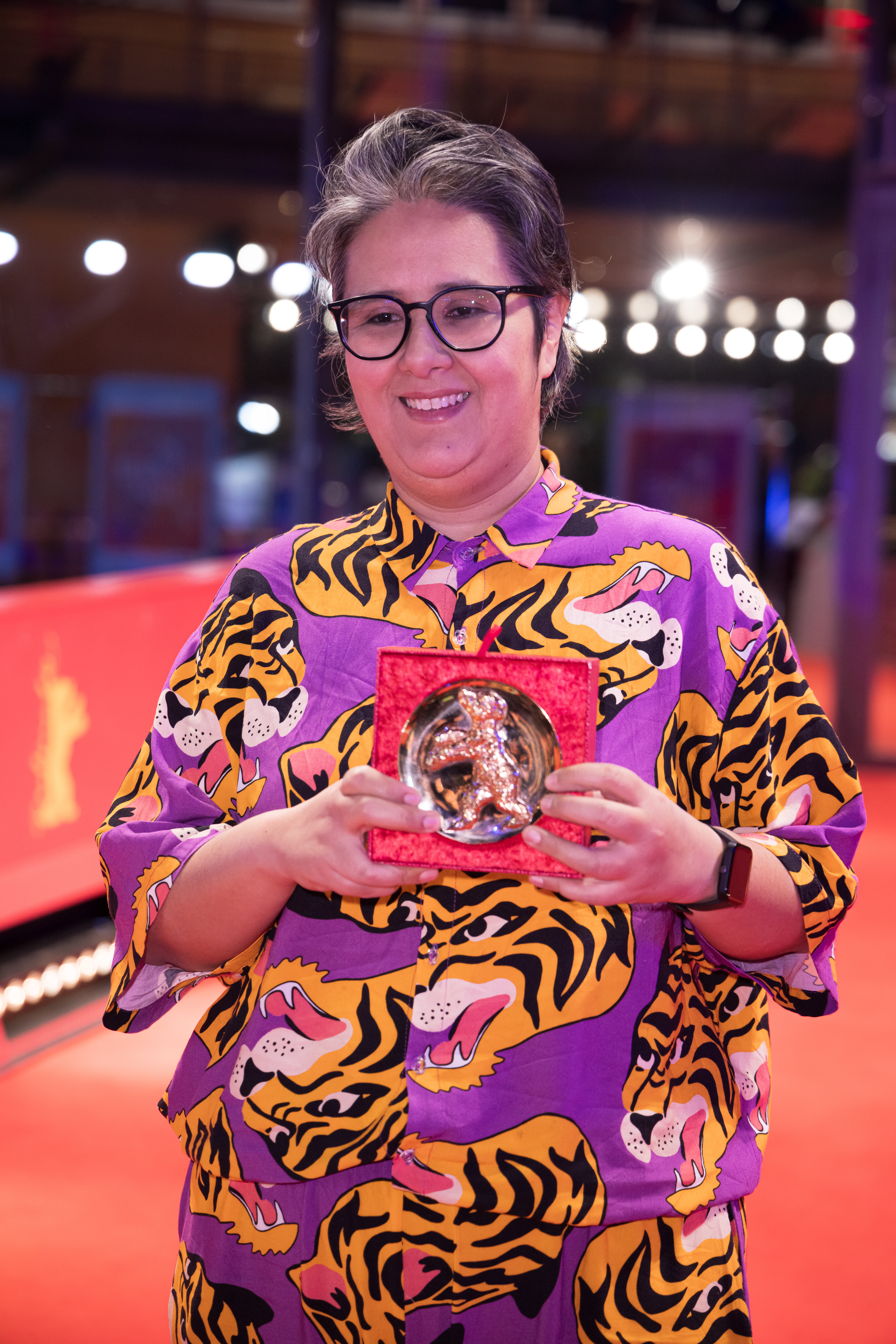
Rojas with the Encounters award for best director at the Berlinale 2024

She graduated from USP in 2005, with specialization in Editing, Screenplay and Sound (1999-2005). Juliana Rojas started her career while she was still in school. According to an interview with her, she said yet on the first year of college she became close friends with Marco Dutra and realized both had shared interests such as scary movies, animation, musicals. She directed her first film with Dutra in 2004, a short movie called Lenço Branco as their final assignment project for school. In the same year, it was part of Cinéfondation in Cannes Film Festival.

This event brought attention to the duo. In 2007, they directed another short film Um Ramo and was nominated to Semaine de la Critique and won Best Short Film. Um Ramo was made with government of São Paulo funding, through an "Edital" (public notice) and produced by Sara Silveira from Dezenove Som e Imagens production company. Juliana Rojas had the opportunity to meet Sara Silveira through a friend in common. Um Ramo helped her get attention in her work and helped her find her aesthetics. It brings fantasy elements to portray urban life of nowadays middle class society and this characteristic is a constant in Juliana Rojas and Marco Dutra’s work.

With Dutra, she codirected As Sombras, a short movie in 2009, and then Desassossego – filme das maravilhas in 2010. After being nominated for Best Short Film in Cannes (2007), Sara Silveira proposed that they brought a feature film screenplay project to show at the Festival. That is how, in 2011, Hard Labor would become Rojas's first feature film and would get into the selection Un Certain Regard, in Cannes Film Festival. This film was nominated for ten categories in Prêmio Fiesp/Sesi-SP, such as Best Movie and Best Director. It featured a frequent actress in their work, Helena Albergaria, who was a longtime friend they met working with Cia. do Latão - a theater company in São Paulo - and Marat Descartes. Hard Labor was edited by Caetano Gotardo, to whom Rojas would edit a film.

Together with Dutra, Rojas won the Silver Leopard award in Locarno Festival with Good Manners, in 2017. However, Rojas did not base her career in only co-directed films with Dutra, she also had some works directed by herself, such as: Vestida in 2008, Pra domir tranquilo in 2011 and O Duplo in 2012 – premiered in Cannes Film Festival and also in 16th Mostra de Cinema Tiradentes, 2013. In 2014, she won Critics Category Award in Gramado Film Festival with her feature film called Sinfonia da Necrópole.

Besides her directing career, she also used her skills as an editor in some important films in Brazilian Cinema, such as: documentary Pulsações (2011) directed by Manoela Ziggiati; Os dias com ele (2012) directed by Maria Clara Escobar and O sol nos meus olhos (2012) directed by Flora Dias, both shown in 16th Mostra de Cinema Tiradentes; TV movie Corpo Presente (2012) by Paolo Gregori and Marcelo Toledo; O que se move (2012) by Caetano Gotardo and Quando eu era vivo (2013) by her Cinema partner Marco Dutra.

== Importance in Brazilian Cinema ==
Rojas participated in very relevant Film Festivals. She has been showing her films in Cannes Film Festival in France since the beginning of her career. She also had her work shown in Locarno Film Festival and Gramado Film Festival. Rojas is one of the filmmakers of contemporary Brazilian Cinema investing in fantastic storytelling, using genres such as thriller, fantasy, drama to create a critical argument of contemporary Brazilian society. She has been compared to and listed with internationally known Brazilian filmmakers and films - as Neighboring Sounds by Kleber Mendonça Filho, for example.

== Filmography ==
=== As Director ===
Year	Film	Notes
2004	O Lenço Branco	Co-directed with Marco Dutra
2007	Um Ramo	Co-directed with Marco Dutra
2008	Vestida	
2009	As Sombras	Co-directed with Marco Dutra
2010	Desassossego – filme das maravilhas	Co-directed with Marco Dutra
2011	Hard Labor / Trabalhar Cansa	Co-directed with Marco Dutra
2011	Pra dormir tranquilo	
2012	O Duplo	
2014	Sinfonia da Necrópole	
2017	Good Manners / As Boas Maneiras	Co-directed with Marco Dutra
2024	Cidade; Campo	

=== As Editor ===
Year	Film	Director
2011	Pulsações	Manoela Ziggiati
2012	Os dias com ele	Maria Clara Escobar
2012	Corpo Presente	Paolo Gregori and Marcelo Toledo
2012	O que se move	Caetano Gotardo
2012	Quando eu era vivo	Marco Dutra

== Awards and nominations ==
- Nominated - Cinéfondantion, 2004 Cannes Film Festival, with O Lenço Branco
- Best Short Film at the 2007 Cannes Film Festival Critics' Week, with Um Ramo
- Nominated - Un Certain Regard, 2011 Cannes Film Festival, with Hard Labor
- Nominated Best Movie, Best Director and other categories in 2012 FIESP/SESI SP's Prize with Hard Labor
- Havana Star Prize for Best Screenplay, 2012 Havana Film Festival New York with Hard Labor
- Nominated - Best Short Film at the 2012 Cannes Film Festival Critics' Week, with O Duplo
- Won Critics Category Award in Gramado Film Festival (2014) with Sinfonia da necrópole
- Won Silver Leopard in 2017 Locarno Film Festival with Good Manners
- Best Director in the Encounters section of the 2024 Berlinale for Cidade; Campo
