= Quando Eu Era Vivo =

2014 film directed by Marco Dutra

- Theatrical release poster
- Directed by: Marco Dutra
- Screenplay by: Gabriela Amaral Almeida; Marco Dutra
- Based on: A Arte de Produzir Efeito Sem Causa by Lourenço Mutarelli
- Starring: Antônio Fagundes; Marat Descartes; Sandy Leah; Gilda Nomacce
- Cinematography: Ivo Lopes Araújo
- Edited by: Juliana Rojas
- Production companies: Camisa Treze; RT Features
- Distributed by: Vitrine Filmes
- Release date: January 31, 2014 (Brazil)
- Country: Brazil
- Language: Portuguese

Quando Eu Era Vivo (When I Was Alive) is a 2014 Brazilian horror drama thriller film directed by Marco Dutra, based on the novel A Arte de Produzir Efeito Sem Causa by Lourenço Mutarelli.

== Plot ==
After the loss of his job and the break-up of his marriage, Junior (Marat Descartes) goes back to live with his father (Antônio Fagundes) at his former childhood home which is now completely refurbished. His bedroom is now occupied by a young and innocent tenant, Bruna (Sandy Leah). He feels a stranger at his father's place, which he finds quite inhospitable and oppressive. At first he sleeps on the couch and spends most of his days cooped up at home brooding over his separation, unemployment as well as spying on Bruna. However, his vulnerable personality takes a turn for the worse when he settles in a small back room cluttered with decorative remembrances of his late mum, which he resolutely puts back on display around the house much to his father's consternation. Among the things he recovers there is an old music score with a mysterious cryptographed message, the comprehension of which is the key to understanding his own past and present better. He gradually and irremediably becomes obsessed with his family's past, recalling amidst an intermixture of delusional disorder and grasps of reality his childhood days spent in the company of his older brother and mystical mother, while suspenseful obscure happenings concurrently become frequent in the house routine.

== Cast ==
- Antônio Fagundes as Sênior
- Marat Descartes as Júnior
- Sandy Leah as Bruna
- Gilda Nomacce as Miranda
- Kiko Bertholini as Pedro
- Helena Albergaria as Olga
- Rony Koren as Paulinho
- Tuna Dwek as Lurdinha
- Eduardo Gomes as Zuzu
