= Lourenço Mutarelli =

Brazilian comic book artist

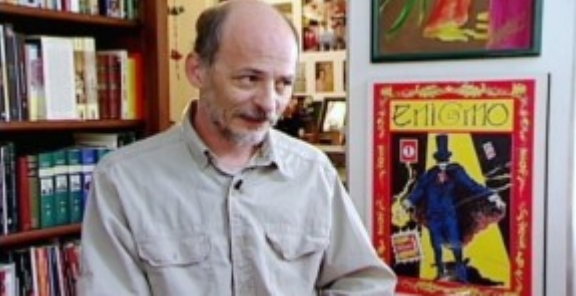
- Born: April 18, 1964 (age 61) São Paulo, Brazil

Lourenço Mutarelli (born April 18, 1964) is a Brazilian comic book artist, writer and actor who became well regarded in the Brazilian underground comics scene in the late 1980s and 1990s.

In addition to comic books, Mutarelli has also created plays, books, and all the illustration and animated sequences of the 2004 motion picture Nina, which was based on the novel Crime and Punishment by Dostoyevsky.

Drained, released in 2006, is a movie adaptation of Mutarelli's first literary work, O Cheiro do Ralo; and he plays a minor role in the film. He also made a guest appearance in the 2014 film Quando Eu Era Vivo, based on his novel A Arte de Produzir Efeito Sem Causa. He also starred in The Second Mother, in 2015.

== Books ==
- O Cheiro do Ralo (Devir Editora / Companhia das Letras)
- O Natimorto (DBA / Companhia das Letras)
- Jesus Kid (Devir Editora) (2004)
- A Arte de Produzir Efeito Sem Causa (Companhia das Letras) (2008)
- Miguel e os Demônios (Companhia das Letras) (2009)
- Nada me Faltará (Companhia das Letras) (2010)
- O grifo de Abdera (Companhia das Letras) (2015)
- O filho mais velho de Deus e/ou Livro IV (Companhia das Letras) (2018)

== Stage plays ==
- O Teatro de Sombras – Coletânea de 5 peças de teatro. (2007) (Devir Editora)

== Comic books and illustrated books ==
- Solúvel (1989)
- Impublicáveis (1990)
- Transubstanciação (1991)
- Desgraçados (1993)
- A Confluência da Forquilha (1997)
- Sequelas (1998)
- Eu te amo Lucimar (1994)
- O Nada (published in the magazine Lúcifer nº01) (1994)
- O Dobro de Cinco (1999)
- O Rei do Ponto
- A Soma de Tudo 1 (2001)
- A Soma de Tudo 2 (2002)
- Mundo Pet (2004)
- Over12
- Resignação (published by Brazilian Heavy Metal)
- A Caixa de Areia ou Eu Era Dois em Meu Quintal (2006)
- O Astronauta ou Livre Associação de um Homem no Espaço (2010)
- Quando Meu Pai se Encontrou com o ET Fazia um Dia Quente (2011)
- Diomedes (Quadrinhos na Cia) (2012)
- Manaus – Cidades Ilustradas (2013)

== Selected filmography ==
- 2007 – Drained
- 2009 – Chamada a Cobrar
- 2014 – Quando Eu Era Vivo
- 2015 – The Second Mother
