= ZAD de Notre-Dame-des-Landes =

"Zone to Defend" near Nantes, France

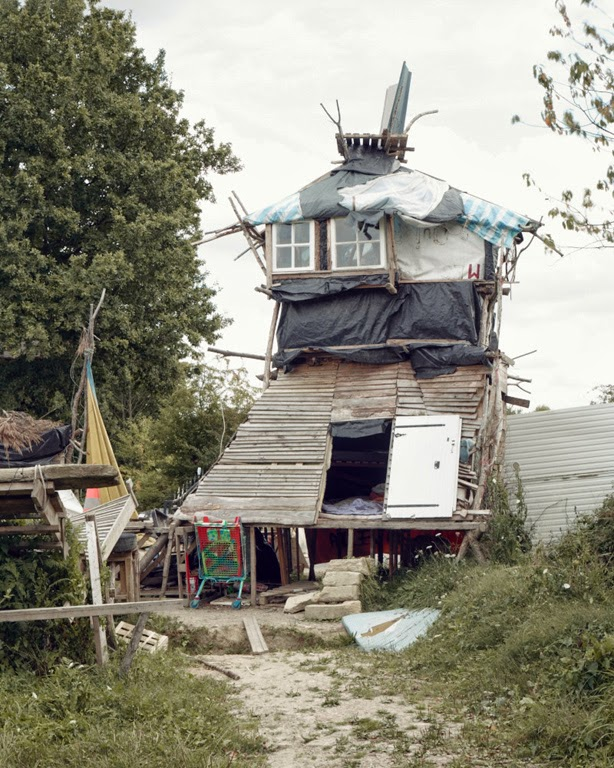
Lookout tower at ZAD NDDL, 2016

ZAD de Notre-Dame-des-Landes (also known as ZAD NDDL) is the best-known 'Zone to Defend' in France. Located in the Loire-Atlantique department near to Nantes, it is a very large, mostly agricultural terrain of 1,650 hectares (4,080 acres) which became nationally famous in the early 2010s and has resisted several concerted attempts by the French state to evict it.

For decades there was local resistance to plans to build a new airport in the rural commune of Notre-Dame-des-Landes. In the 2000s much of the land was squatted as farmers defied eviction. The new occupants set up autonomous self-sufficient structures such as a communal bakery and animal husbandry. Attempts to evict the squatters saw largescale counter-mobilisations in 2012 and 2018. French president Emmanuel Macron announced in January 2018 that the plans for the airport would be shelved and the already existing airport at Nantes would be redeveloped instead. Many of the remaining projects at the ZAD then engaged in a process of legalisation.

== History ==
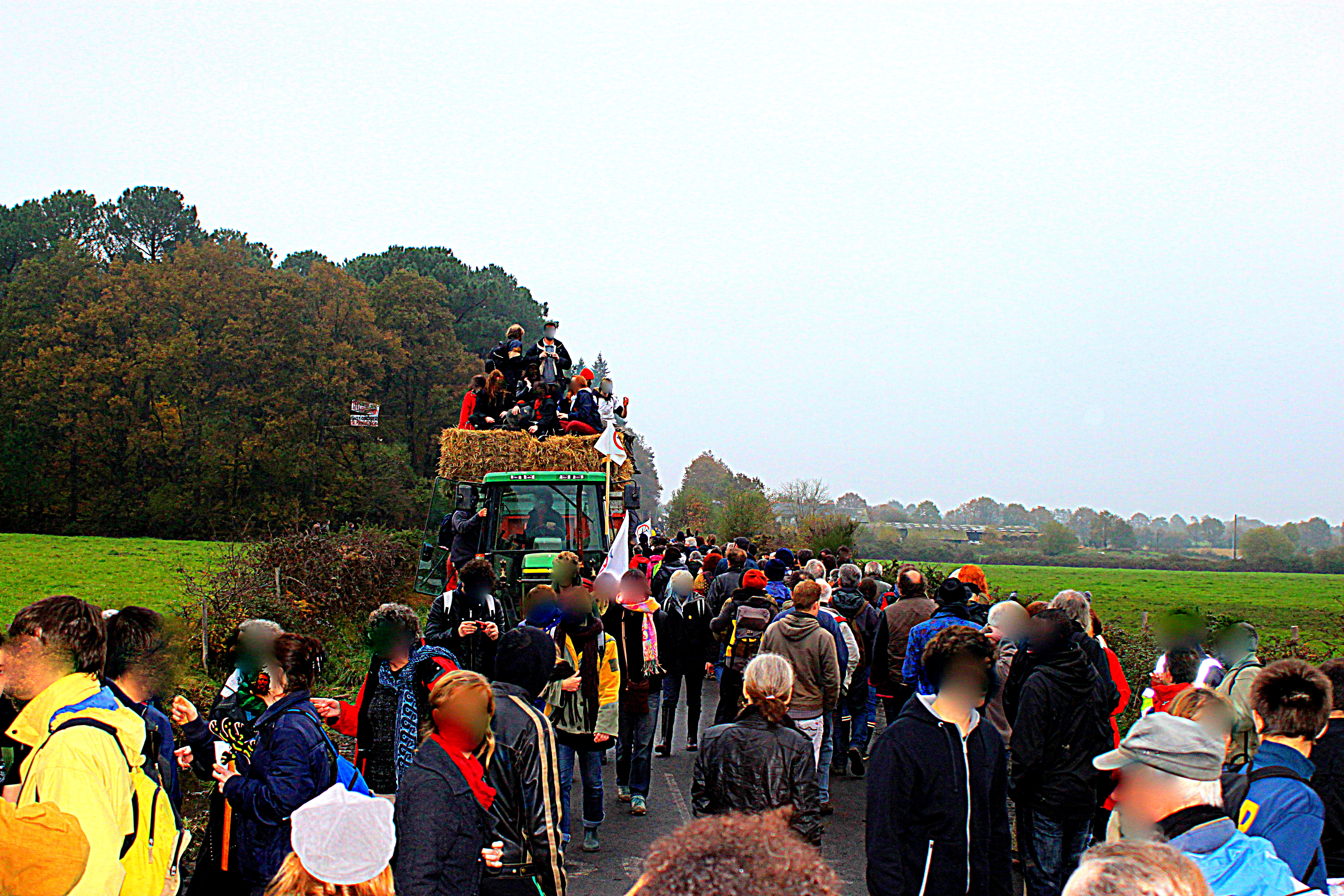
Part of the demonstration of 17 November 2012 at the ZAD de Notre-Dame-des-Landes

There had been plans since the 1960s to build an airport at Notre-Dame-des-Landes (NDDL), which had been bitterly opposed by local farmers and environmentalists. As residents were evicted from their homes, they refused to leave and became squatters, joined by activists who built their own homes and lived in the trees. The first occupation was the Rosiers farm in August 2007.

Jean-Marc Ayrault, the Socialist prime minister and former mayor of Nantes, declared in 2012 "This airport will happen." The attempt to evict the squatters began in October 2012 and was called Opération César. It was met with barricades made from human chains and farmers' tractors. After government forces had destroyed 13 cabins and farmhouses,^{:57} the call to reoccupy the ZAD resulted in a demonstration on 17 November of over 40,000 people. Many of them would participate in the building of a small village, henceforth to be the headquarters of the resistance. In the words of two participant-observers:

Once in the zad, thousands of us lined up either side of newly cut tracks, shoulder to shoulder, forming a human chain that stretched over half a kilometer from the trailers to the building site in the middle of a chestnut grove. Piece by piece, hand by hand, strangers passed planks, drainpipes, furniture, pots and pans, logs, bathtubs, stoves. As the sun set, someone brought a drum kit and amps into the middle of the coppice and experimental jazz accompanied the hammering that went on late into the night. This was theater as it should be, (...) a festival of disobedience.^{:58}

Dubbed the la Chat-teigne, the hamlet included a bar, communal kitchen, blacksmith's workshops, dormitories, a first aid post, a bathroom (with hot tub), and a communications office broadcasting pirate radio. It was protected by 40 tractors linked together. The eviction operation involved 2,000 police and eventually the government backed down because of the public support for the occupiers. In this time over 200 support committees were set up, across France.

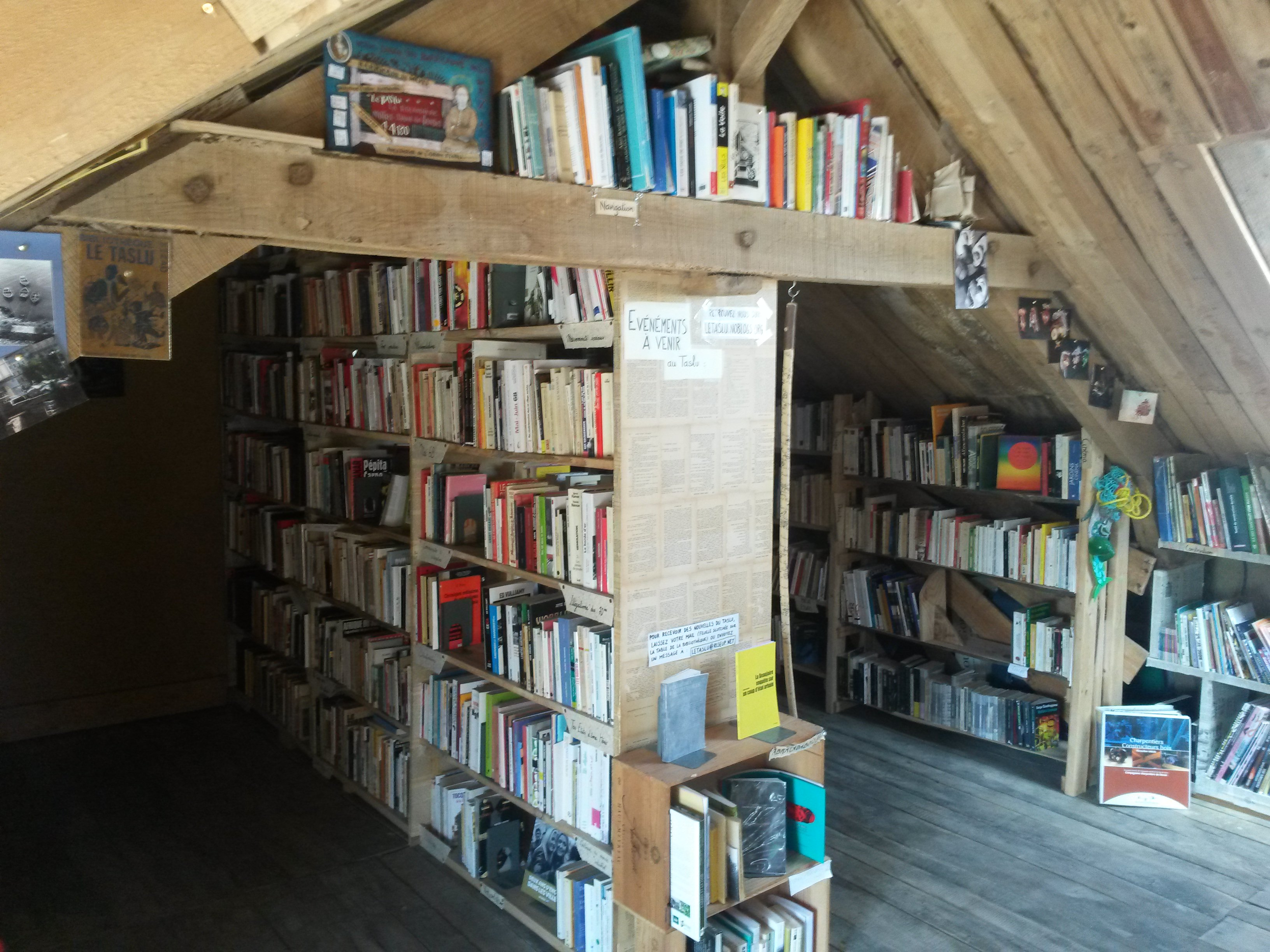
Library at la Rolandière

In 2016, Aéroport du Grand Ouest (AGO), a subsidiary of VINCI Airports, began eviction proceedings against the last eleven families living on the disputed terrain. Over one thousand people attended the court case to support the farmers. On the previous weekend, 20,000 people had blocked traffic on regional roads.

There were around 70 different networked sites on the ZAD by 2017. Amongst the self-organised projects there were vegetable plots, a bakery (making bread from locally grown grain), a brewery, a pirate radio station and a newspaper collective. There were also herds of cows, goats and sheep.

== 2018 eviction battle ==
French president Emmanuel Macron announced in January 2018 that the plans for the airport would be shelved and the already existing airport at Nantes would be reinvigorated instead. The prime minister, Édouard Philippe, said that the squatters would have until spring to leave. This was a victory for campaigners who had fought for 50 years against the airport, using demonstrations, legal challenges, occupations (legal and illegal), sabotage and solidarity actions.

On the ZAD itself, there were different reactions to the victory and looming eviction battle. Some people wanted to negotiate with the state to formalise their occupations and some wanted to remain autonomous. The D281 road had been closed by the state in 2013, then unofficially reopened and controlled by Zadistes. When the local municipality demanded that it was opened again, opinions varied on whether it was good to show willingness to collaborate or if it was simply the first step in the state's plan to evict. After much debate, the road was reopened and the structures built on the road were moved. One house was moved twice and then was destroyed during the later eviction attempt. These tensions resulted in a person from the non-negotiation camp being beaten up on March 20. Several masked people attacked La gaîté squat and took the man away tied up in the boot of a car. After being beaten up he was dumped outside a psychiatric hospital in Blain. On the same night there was an arson attack on a farm called La Freusière.

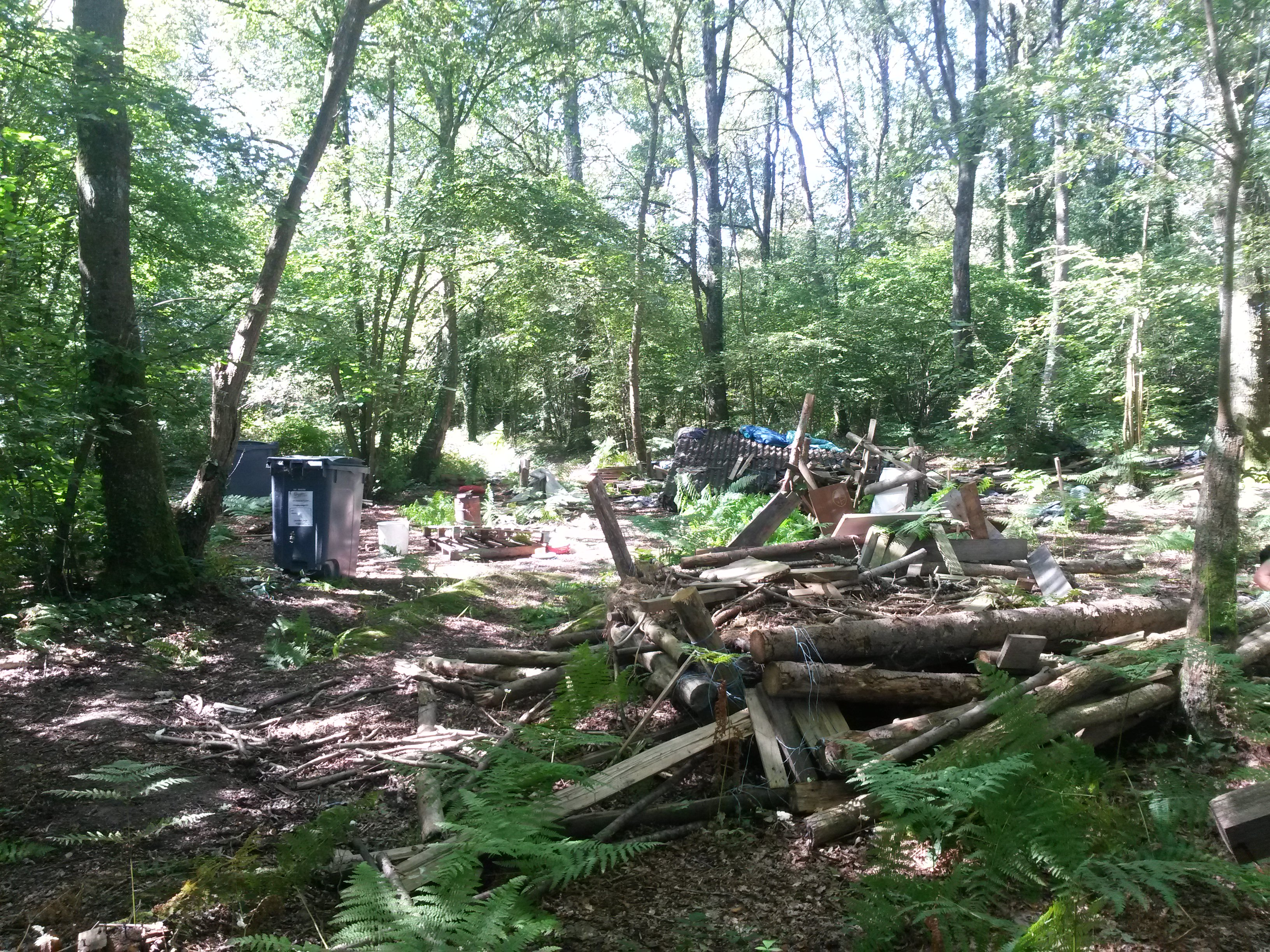
Remains of a cabin destroyed by police in spring 2018 in the Rohanne Woods

In April 2018, a large scale eviction operation began as the French state tried to regain control of the autonomous zone. After the first morning (April 9), police claimed that 10 out of 97 squats had been evicted. One evicted project was a farm called 100 Noms (100 Names) which had a barn and a herd of twenty ewes. On the second day (April 10), squatters employed barricades of car tyres, wooden pallets, hay bales and electricity poles which they set on fire to hamper the police, who were bulldozing the self-built houses. On day three (April 11), over a thousand people attended a picnic which was then attacked by the police. Places that were evicted included la Boite Noire, Dalle à Caca, Jesse James and la Gaité.

After 10 days (April 19), the police had fired 11,000 projectiles. According to Europe 1 this could be broken down into almost 8,000 tear gas canisters and more than 3,000 stun grenades. The squatters reported 272 injuries, although they preferred to be vague on details since during the 2012 eviction attempt people reporting injuries had been arrested at the hospital (the police stated 77 officers had been wounded and also three journalists had been injured).

Prime Minister Édouard Philippe announced a halt to the eviction on April 26 and said it would be frozen until at least May 14. The state estimated that 29 projects had been destroyed and 60-70 still existed. The truce came about as representatives of the ZAD negotiated for legal recognition for 28 projects. Some projects agreed to file individual claims, whereas other refused to participate in the process. 1000 police officers were sent home, leaving 1500 at the ZAD.

Fifteen out of the 28 submitted projects were accepted, including the proposals from 100 Noms to make wool from a herd of 80 sheep and to make buckwheat pancakes. On Thursday, May 17, the eviction operations resumed. According to the Minister of Agriculture, Stéphane Travert, a dozen more sites would be evicted. On Tuesday, May 22, a 21-year-old man had his right hand amputated after it was severely damaged by a projectile canister.

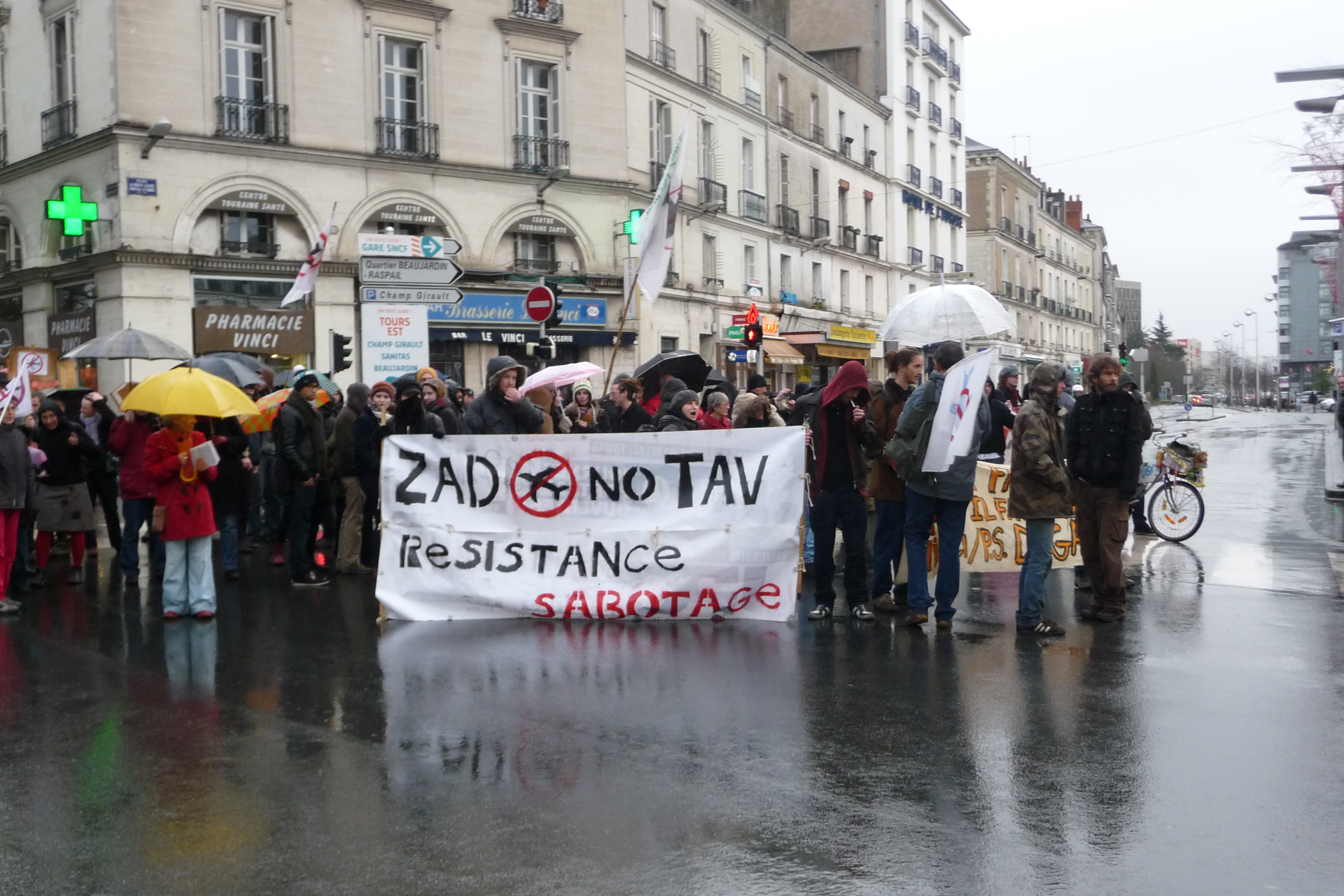
Solidarity demonstration in Tours on 15 December 2013

There were many solidarity actions worldwide in response to the 2018 eviction attempt. Le Monde published an open letter calling for people in the film industry to support the ZAD, which was signed by over 250 filmmakers, including Pedro Costa, Philippe Garrel and Aki Kaurismäki.

== Legalization processes ==
In April 2019, Zadists were hoping to sign leases for their projects. Twenty projects on the ZAD opened their doors to visitors. These included L’Ambazada, Bellevue, Le Liminbout, Le Moulin and La Vacherie.

In 2020, the situation on the ZAD was described by the Prefect of Pays de la Loire as "relaxed but without full mutual understanding" ("la détente, pas encore totalement l’entente"). The site could cope with the COVID-19 pandemic in France because it had only 200 inhabitants spread over 1,695 hectares, although the farmers were finding it difficult that restriction had led to the open markets where they usually sold their produce being closed. At the same time, Vinci continued to press the state for the 1 billion euros in damages it is claiming for the cancellation of the plans for the new airport.

== Film ==
Zad de NDDL, Lande habitée short film

- Notre-Dame-des-Landes, au cœur de la lutte (2012) documentary by Pierrick Morin, 70 minutes.
- Le tarmac est dans le pré (2013) documentary by Thibault Férié, 52 minutes, screened in October 2013 on France 3.
- Des tracteurs contre des avions (2013) documentary by Christian Baudu, 31 minutes.
- Zad de NDDL, Lande habitée (2018) short film by Camille, 6 minutes.
- Étincelle (2021) documentary by Antoine Harari and Valeria Mazzucchi, 61 minutes.
- Return to the Commons (2018) documentary by Ryan Powell, 15 minutes. Novara Media
- Everything's coming together while everything's falling apart: The ZAD (2017), a film by Oliver Ressler, 36 min.
- Direct Action (2024), documentary film by Guillaume Cailleau and Ben Russell, 216 minutes.
