= Online Film Critics Society Awards 2024 =

28th Online Film Critics Society Awards

28th Online Film Critics Society Awards
- Date: January 27, 2025

Highlights
- Best Picture: Anora
- Most awards: Dune: Part Two (5)
- Most nominations: Dune: Part Two (9)

The 28th Online Film Critics Society Awards, honoring the best in film for 2024, were announced on January 27, 2025, by the Online Film Critics Society.

The nominations were announced on January 17, 2025. Dune: Part Two led the nominations with nine, followed by The Brutalist with eight.

== Winners and nominees ==
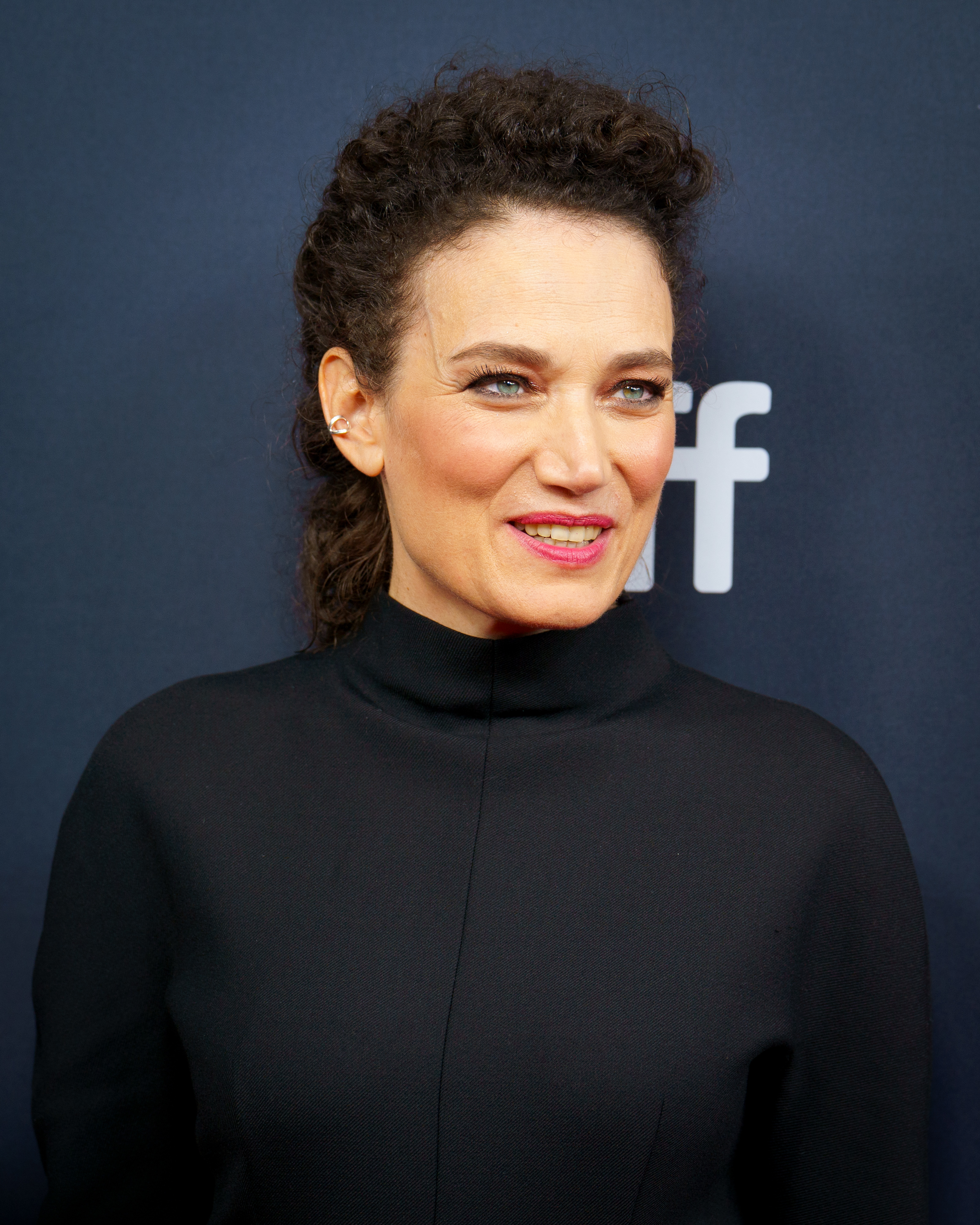
Coralie Fargeat, Best Director winner

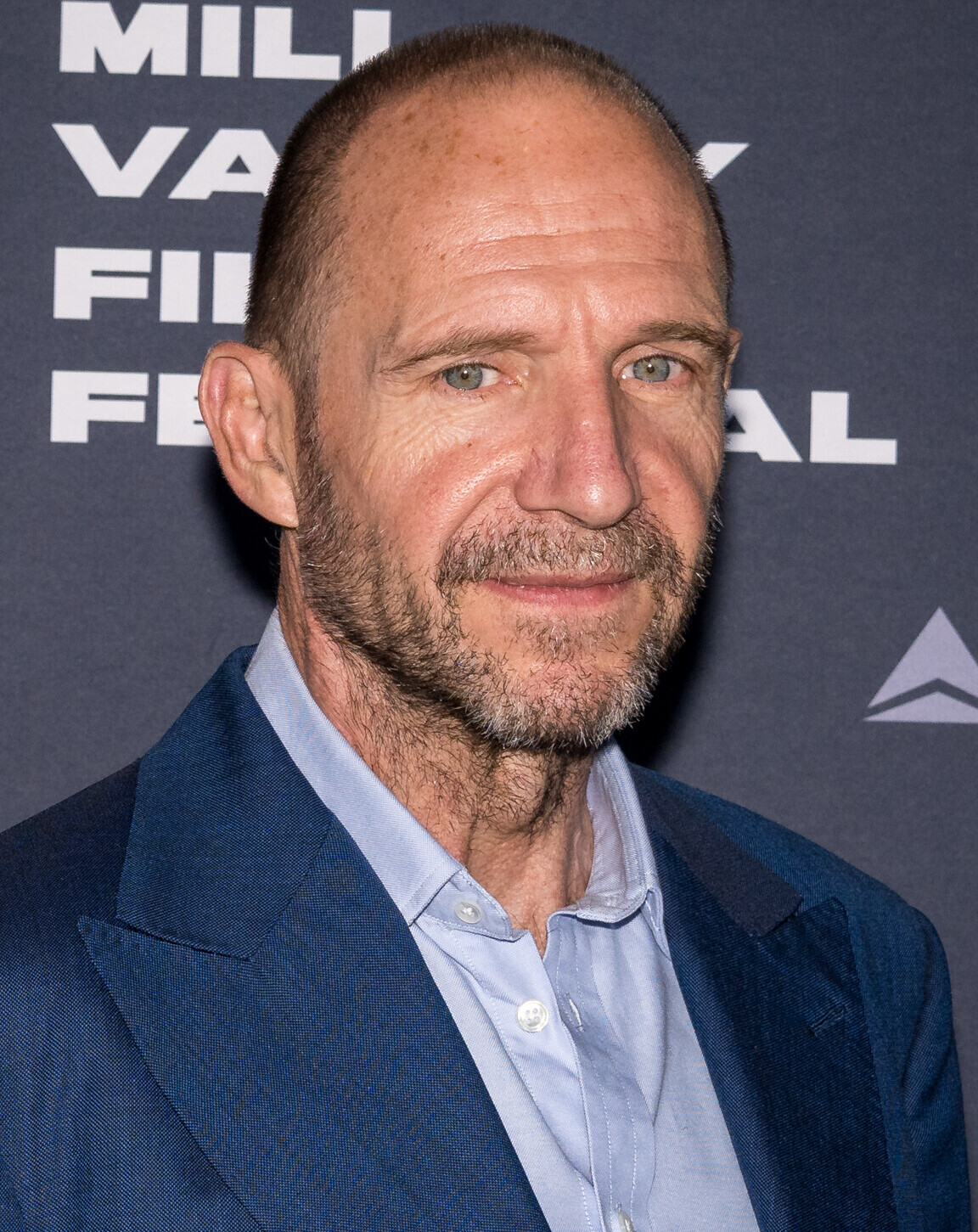
Ralph Fiennes, Best Actor winner

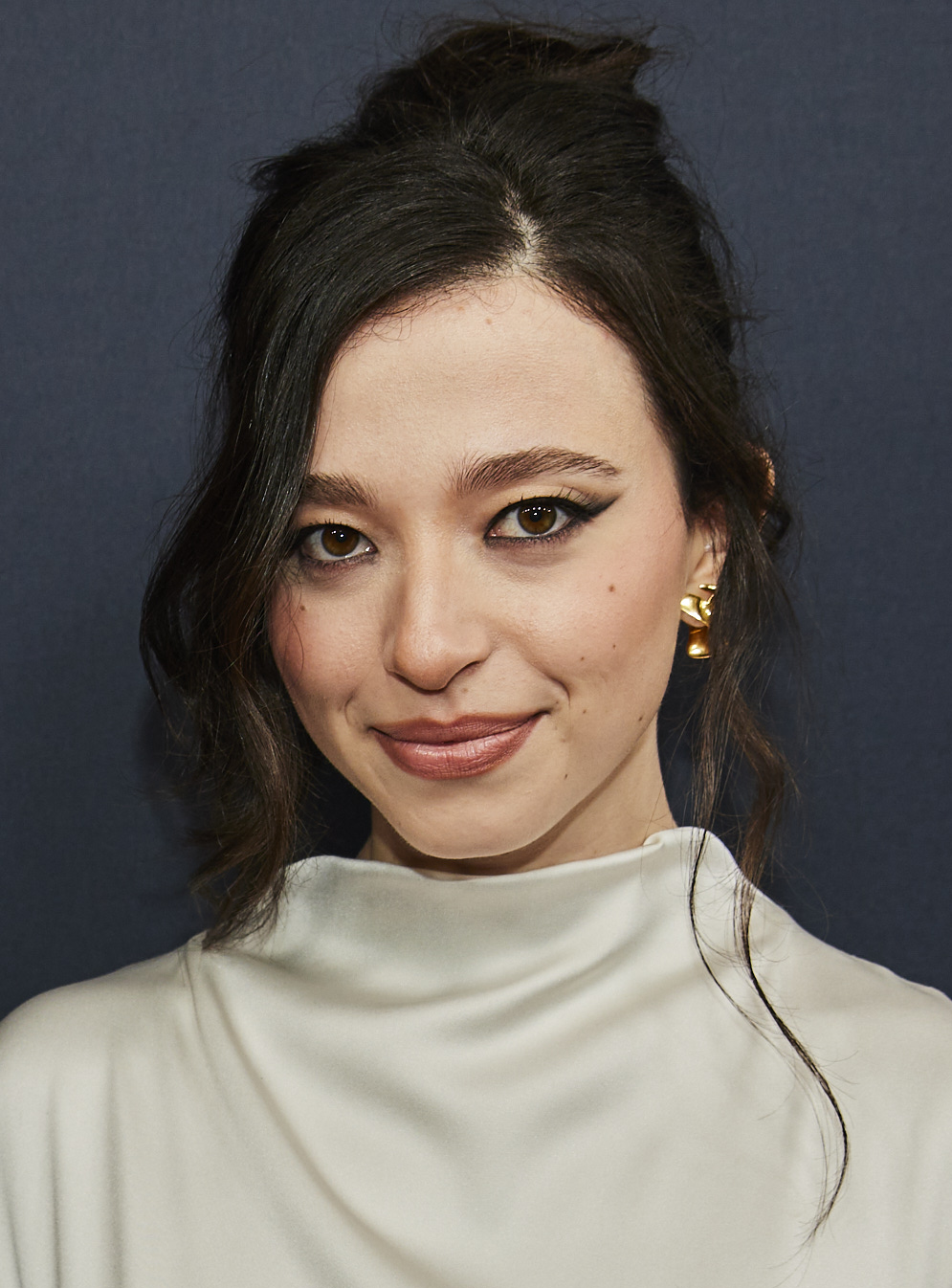
Mikey Madison, Best Actress winner

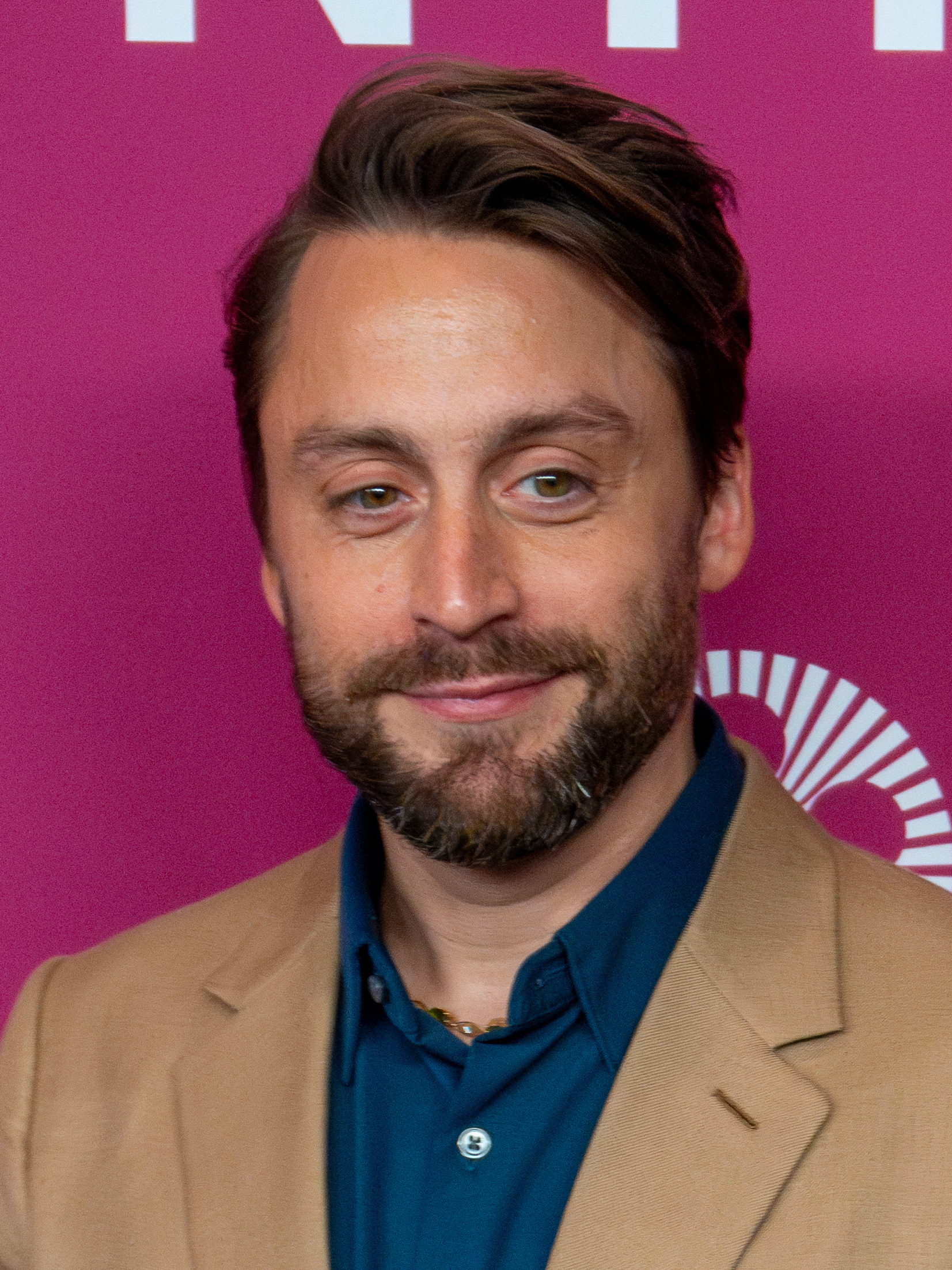
Kieran Culkin, Best Supporting Actor winner

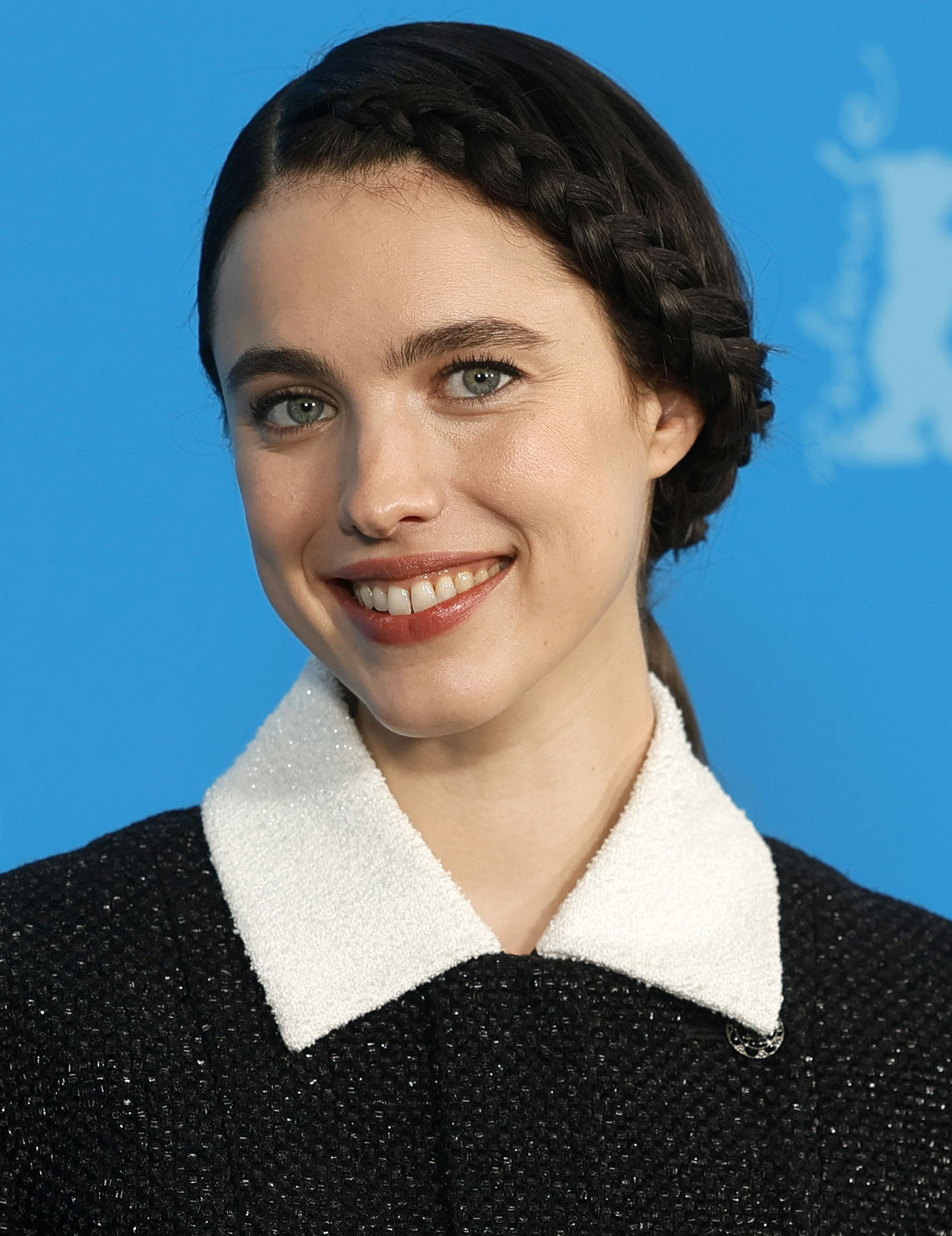
Margaret Qualley, Best Supporting Actress winner

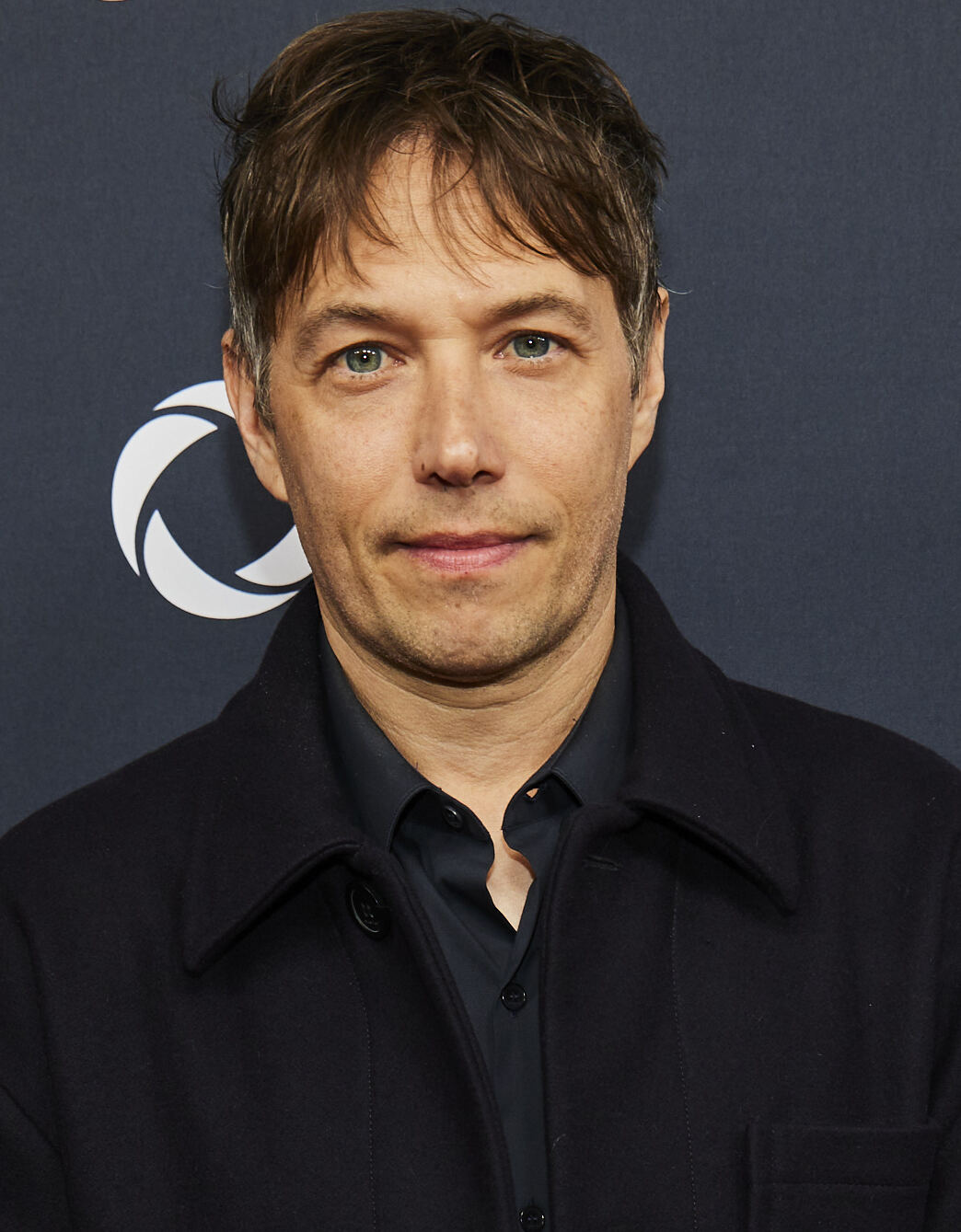
Sean Baker, Best Original Screenplay winner

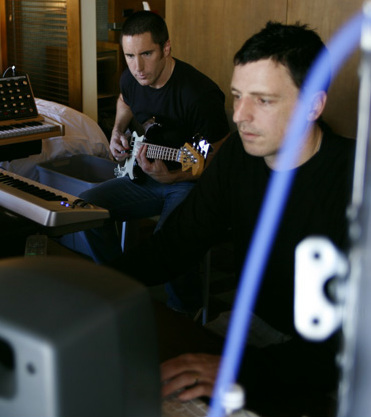
Trent Reznor & Atticus Ross, Best Original Score winners

Best Picture	Best Director
1. Anora; 2. The Substance; 3. The Brutalist; 4. Challengers; 5. Nickel Boys; 6. Conclave; 7. Dune: Part Two; 8. Nosferatu; 9. I Saw the TV Glow; 10. Wicked	Coralie Fargeat – The Substance; Sean Baker – Anora; Brady Corbet – The Brutalist; RaMell Ross – Nickel Boys; Denis Villeneuve – Dune: Part Two
Best Actor	Best Actress
Ralph Fiennes – Conclave as Cardinal Thomas Lawrence; Adrien Brody – The Brutalist as László Tóth; Timothée Chalamet – A Complete Unknown as Bob Dylan; Colman Domingo – Sing Sing as John "Divine G" Whitfield; Sebastian Stan – A Different Man as Edward Lemuel	Mikey Madison – Anora as Anora "Ani" Mikheeva; Cynthia Erivo – Wicked as Elphaba Thropp; Marianne Jean-Baptiste – Hard Truths as Pansey Deacon; Demi Moore – The Substance as Elisabeth Sparkle; Fernanda Torres – I'm Still Here as Eunice Paiva
Best Supporting Actor	Best Supporting Actress
Kieran Culkin – A Real Pain as Benji Kaplan; Yura Borisov – Anora as Igor; Clarence Maclin – Sing Sing as Clarence "Divine Eye" Maclin; Edward Norton – A Complete Unknown as Pete Seeger; Guy Pearce – The Brutalist as Harrison Lee Van Buren Sr.	Margaret Qualley – The Substance as Sue; Aunjanue Ellis-Taylor – Nickel Boys as Hattie; Ariana Grande – Wicked as Galinda Upland; Isabella Rossellini – Conclave as Sister Agnes; Zoe Saldaña – Emilia Pérez as Rita Mora Castro
Best Animated Feature	Best Film Not in the English Language
Flow; Inside Out 2; Memoir of a Snail; Wallace & Gromit: Vengeance Most Fowl; The Wild Robot	All We Imagine as Light; Emilia Pérez; Flow; I'm Still Here; The Seed of the Sacred Fig
Best Documentary	Best Debut Feature
Dahomey; Daughters; Soundtrack to a Coup d'Etat; Sugarcane; Will & Harper	Vera Drew – The People's Joker; Annie Baker – Janet Planet; India Donaldson – Good One; Anna Kendrick – Woman of the Hour; Josh Margolin – Thelma
Best Original Screenplay	Best Adapted Screenplay
Sean Baker – Anora; Brady Corbet and Mona Fastvold – The Brutalist; Jesse Eisenberg – A Real Pain; Coralie Fargeat – The Substance; Justin Kuritzkes – Challengers	Peter Straughan – Conclave; Clint Bentley and Greg Kwedar – Sing Sing; Robert Eggers – Nosferatu; RaMell Ross and Joslyn Barnes – Nickel Boys; Denis Villeneuve and Jon Spaihts – Dune: Part Two
Best Cinematography	Best Editing
Greig Fraser – Dune: Part Two; Jarin Blaschke – Nosferatu; Lol Crawley – The Brutalist; Stéphane Fontaine – Conclave; Jomo Fray – Nickel Boys	Marco Costa – Challengers; Sean Baker – Anora; Coralie Fargeat, Jérôme Eltabet, and Valentin Féron – The Substance; Nicholas Monsour – Nickel Boys; Joe Walker – Dune: Part Two
Best Costume Design	Best Production Design
Jacqueline West – Dune: Part Two; Jenny Beavan – Furiosa: A Mad Max Saga; Lisy Christl – Conclave; Linda Muir – Nosferatu; Paul Tazewell – Wicked	Patrice Vermette – Dune: Part Two; Judy Becker – The Brutalist; Nathan Crowley – Wicked; Colin Gibson – Furiosa: A Mad Max Saga; Craig Lathrop – Nosferatu
Best Original Score	Best Visual Effects
Trent Reznor and Atticus Ross – Challengers; Volker Bertelmann – Conclave; Daniel Blumberg – The Brutalist; Kris Bowers – The Wild Robot; Hans Zimmer – Dune: Part Two	Dune: Part Two; Furiosa: A Mad Max Saga; Kingdom of the Planet of the Apes; The Substance; Wicked

== Special awards ==
=== Technical Achievement Awards ===
- Choreography – Wicked
- Makeup &/or Hairstyling – A Different Man
- Makeup &/or Hairstyling – The Substance
- Sound – Dune: Part Two
- Stunts – Furiosa: A Mad Max Saga

=== Lifetime Achievement Awards ===
- Rick Baker
- David Cronenberg
- Clint Eastwood
- Elaine May
- Christine Vachon

=== Special Achievement Awards ===
- Barbara Crampton, super supporter of indie first time filmmakers
- Nicolas Cage, for his infinite capacity to constantly surprise everyone
- Ava DuVernay, for brilliant work of her own and for supporting a new generation of female filmmakers

=== Non-U.S. Releases ===
- Acting (Sophie Fiennes, United Kingdom)
- The Adamant Girl (PS Vinothraj, India)
- Cloud (Kiyoshi Kurosawa, Japan)
- Direct Action (Guillaume Cailleau & Ben Russell, France)
- Disco Afrika: A Malagasy Story (Luck Razanajaona, Madagascar)
- Dying (Matthias Glasner, Germany)
- I'm Not Everything I Want to Be (Klára Tasovská, Czech Republic)
- The Moon Is Upside Down (Loren Taylor, New Zealand)
- The Other Way Around (Jonás Trueba, Spain)
- Subject: Filmmaking (Jörg Adolph & Edgar Reitz, Germany)

== Films with multiple nominations and awards ==
Films that received multiple nominations
Nominations	Film
9	Dune: Part Two
8	The Brutalist
7	Conclave
7	The Substance
6	Anora
6	Nickel Boys
6	Wicked
5	Nosferatu
4	Challengers
3	Furiosa: A Mad Max Saga
3	Sing Sing
2	A Complete Unknown
2	Emilia Pérez
2	Flow
2	I'm Still Here
2	A Real Pain
2	The Wild Robot

Films that received multiple awards
Awards	Film
5	Dune: Part Two
3	Anora
3	The Substance
2	Challengers
2	Conclave
