= Encounters (Berlinale) =

Section of Berlin International Film Festival

Encounters was a section of the Berlin International Film Festival's official selection. It was established in 2020 when the new leadership inaugurated, and the competitive section was aimed to introduce both narrative films and documentaries with innovative and independent perspective.

In 2025, following Carlo Chatrian and Mariette Rissenbeek's dismissal, the section was officially dropped by the new festival heading team.

== Award winners ==
=== Best film ===
Year	English title	Original title	Director	Production Country
2020	The Works and Days	The Works and Days (of Tayoko Shiojiri in the Shiotani Basin)	Anders Edström and C.W. Winter	Japan, Sweden, United Kingdom, United States
2021	We	Nous	Alice Diop	France
2022	Mutzenbacher		Ruth Beckermann	Austria
2023	Here		Bas Devos	Belgium
2024	Direct Action		Guillaume Cailleau and Ben Russell	Germany, France

=== Other awards ===
Year	Award	Recipient	English title	Original title	Production Country
2020	Special Jury Award	Sandra Wollner	The Trouble with Being Born		Austria
2020	Best Director	Cristi Puiu	Malmkrog		Romania
2020	Special Mention	Matías Piñeiro	Isabella		Argentina
2021	Special Jury Award	Lê Bảo	Taste	Vị	Vietnam
2021	Best Director	Ramon Zürcher; Silvan Zürcher	The Girl and the Spider	Das Mädchen und die Spinne	Switzerland
2021	Best Director	Denis Côté	Social Hygiene	Hygiène sociale	Canada
2021	Special Mention	Fern Silva	Rock Bottom Riser		United States
2022	Special Jury Award	Mitra Farahani	See You Friday, Robinson	À vendredi, Robinson	France
2022	Best Director	Cyril Schäublin	Unrest	Unruh	Switzerland
2023	Special Jury Award	Paul B. Preciado	Orlando, My Political Biography	Orlando, ma biographie politique	France
2023	Special Jury Award	Lois Patiño	Samsara		Spain
2023	Best Director	Tatiana Huezo	The Echo	El eco	Mexico
2024	Special Jury Award	Qiu Yang	Some Rain Must Fall	空房间里的女人	China, United States, France, Singapore
2024	Special Jury Award	Aliyar Rasti	The Great Yawn of History	Khamyazeye bozorg	Iran
2024	Best Director	Juliana Rojas	Cidade; Campo		Brazil, Germany, France
