= Sasha Litvintseva =

Russian filmmaker and author

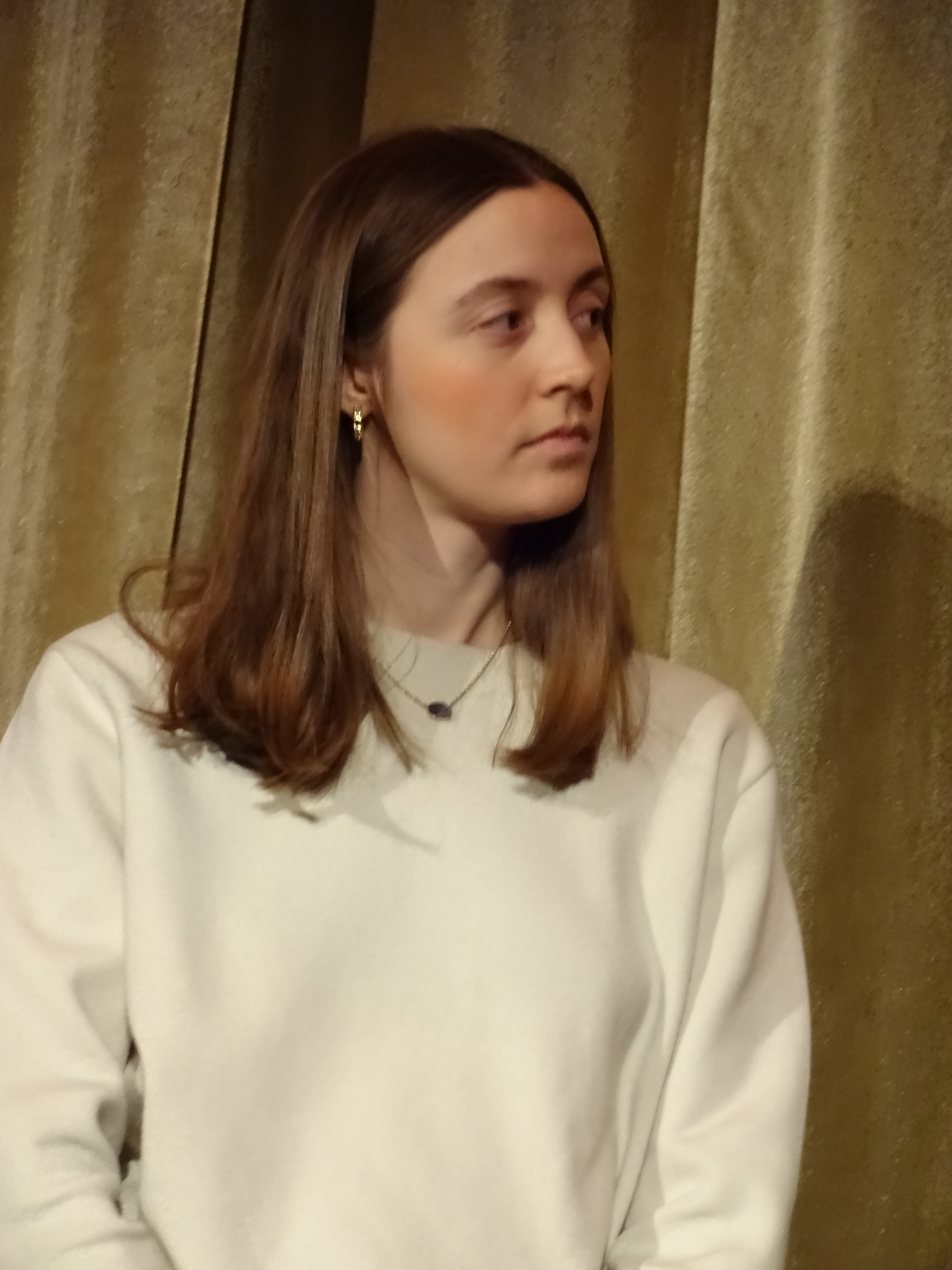
- Litvintseva in Berlin, 2020
- Born: 1989 (age 36–37); Russia
- Education: Slade School of Fine Art, Goldsmiths, University of London
- Occupations: Artist, filmmaker, author
- Years active: 2013–present
- Notable work: Geological Filmmaking (2022 book); Constant (2022 film); A Demonstration (2020 film)

Sasha Litvintseva is an artist, filmmaker and author, based in London. She is known for her films Constant, A Demonstration, and her book Geological Filmmaking.

== Early life and education ==
Sasha graduated from the Slade School of Fine Art in 2012 and holds a PhD in Media, Communications and Cultural Studies from Goldsmiths, University of London.

== Career ==
In 2014, Sasha's first short Alluvion, premiered at Aesthetica Short Film Festival. In 2015, her short Evergreen, premiered at Festival du nouveau cinéma and screened at Alchemy Film & Moving Image Festival and Moscow International Biennale for Young Art, and her short Immortality, home and elsewhere, premiered at Ann Arbor Film Festival and screened at Edinburgh International Film Festival and Chicago Underground Film Festival. In 2016, her short Exile Exotic, premiered at Cinéma du Réel and later screened at Venice Biennale of Architecture.

In 2016, She co-directed the documentary Asbestos, along with Graeme Arnfield, which premiered at the Berlin International Film Festival and screened at the Berlinische Galerie and the Smart Museum of Art. In 2017, she co-directed Salarium, along with Daniel Mann, premiered at Cinéma du Réel and screened at the Institute of Contemporary Arts and the Museum of Contemporary Art, Chicago. These films were part of her project on Geological Filmmaking, which has been published as a book by Open Humanities Press in 2022.

In 2020, Sasha co-directed A Demonstration, along with her long-term collaborator Beny Wagner, which premiered at the Berlin International Film Festival and screened at the Museum of the Moving Image and the Vancouver International Film Festival. In 2022, she and Wagner released their second film Constant, which premiered at the International Film Festival Rotterdam and screened at CPH:DOX and the Open City Documentary Festival. Their newest film My Want of You Partakes of Me, screened at Tate Modern in November 2023 and will be exhibited as a two channel installation at the Sonic Acts Biennale 2024.

== Filmography ==
- 2023 – My Want of You Partakes of Me
- 2022 – Constant
- 2020 – A Demonstration
- 2020 – Every Rupture
- 2019 – Bilateria
- 2017 – Salarium
- 2016 – Asbestos
- 2016 – The Stability of the System
- 2015 – Exile Exotic
- 2015 – Immortality, Home and Elsewhere
- 2014 – Evergreen
- 2013 – Alluvion

== Publications ==
- 2022 – Geological Filmmaking
- 2021 – All Thoughts Fly: Monster, Taxonomy, Film (co-written with Beny Wagner)

== Awards and nominations ==
Year	Result	Award	Category	Work	Ref.
2023	Won	Academia Film Olomouc	Best Film	Constant	
2022	Won	Guanajuato International Film Festival	Best Documentary Short Film	Constant	
2022	Won	IndieLisboa	Best Short Film	Constant	
2022	Nominated	International Film Festival Rotterdam	Ammodo Tiger Shorts Award	Constant	
2022	Nominated	CPH:DOX	New Vision Award	Constant	
2021	Nominated	La Roche-sur-Yon International Film Festival	Prix Nouvelles Vagues Acuitis	A Demonstration	
2020	Nominated	Berlin International Film Festival	Best Short Film	A Demonstration	
2018	Nominated	Montreal International Documentary Festival	International Short	Salarium	
2018	Won	Cinéma du Réel	Original Music Award	Salarium	
2016	Nominated	Cinéma du Réel	Short Film Award	Exile Exotic	
2015	Nominated	Edinburgh International Film Festival	Best Short Film	Immortality, Home and Elsewhere	
