= Glanz =

Glanz is a surname. Notable people with the surname include:

- Gaspard Glanz (born 1987), French video journalist
- James Glanz, American journalist
- Karen Glanz (born 1953), American behavioural epidemiologist
- Peter Glanz (born 1983), British-American writer and director
- Peter Glanz (born 1962), Danish motorcycle speedway rider
