= Beny Wagner =

Artist, filmmaker, author

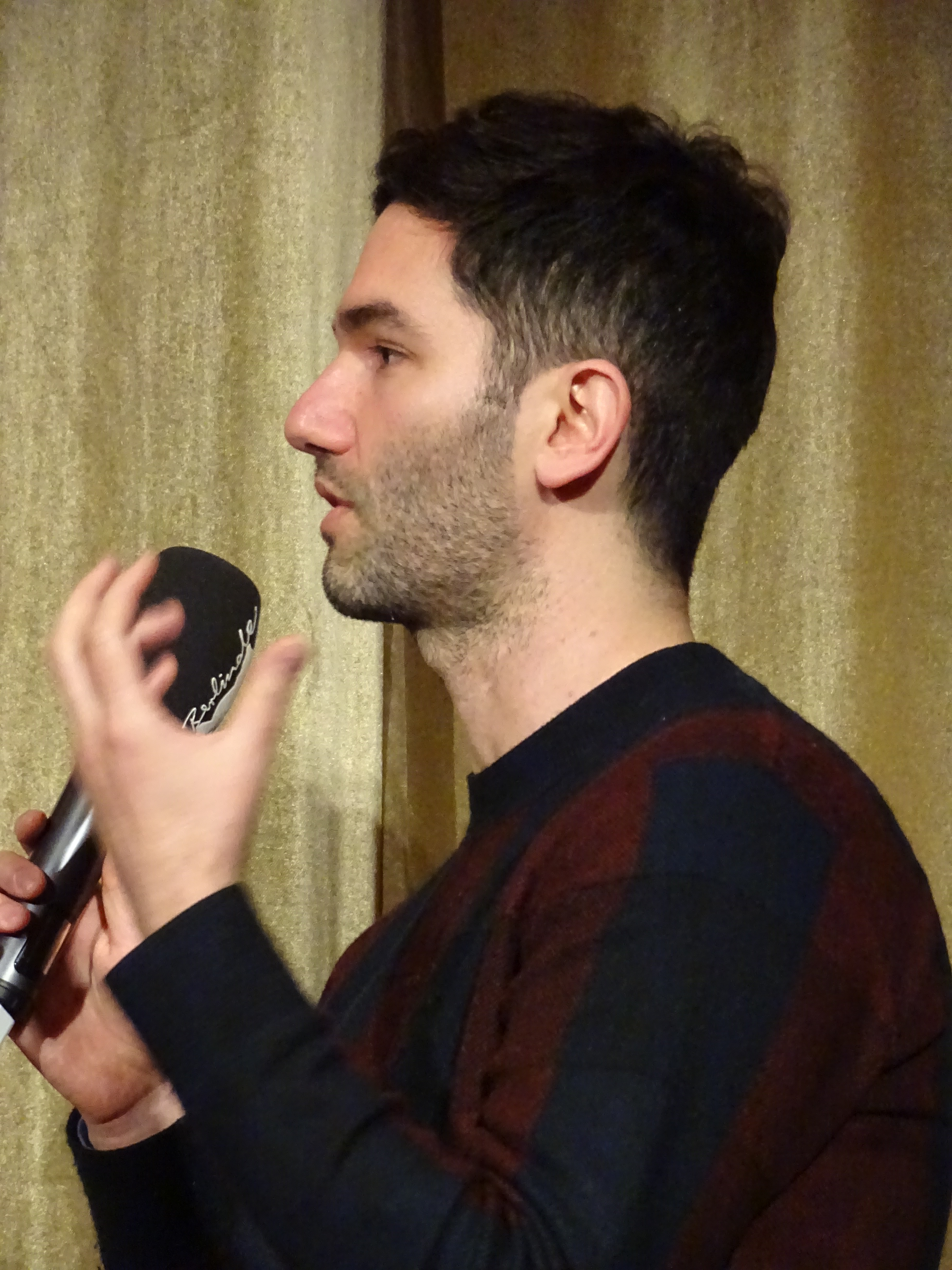
- at Berlinale 2020, Berlin
- Born: 1985 (age 40–41); Berlin, Germany
- Education: Bard College, Jan van Eyck Academie
- Occupations: Artist, filmmaker, author
- Notable work: Constant (2022 film); A Demonstration (2020 film)
- Website: benywagner.com

Beny Wagner (born 1985) is an artist, filmmaker and author. He is known for his films Constant and A Demonstration.

== Early life and education ==
Wagner was born in 1985 in Berlin.

Wagner graduated with a bachelor of arts from Bard College in 2008, and was a postgraduate fellow at Jan van Eyck Academie in 2015-2016.

== Career ==
Wagner's first short film Eye Farm, premiered at the International Film Festival Rotterdam in 2017.

In 2020, Wagner co-directed A Demonstration, together with his long-term collaborator Sasha Litvintseva, which premiered at the Berlin International Film Festival and screened at the Museum of the Moving Image and the Vancouver International Film Festival.

In 2022, he collaborated again with Sasha Litvintseva on Constant, which premiered at the International Film Festival Rotterdam and screened at CPH:DOX and the Open City Documentary Festival. The film is a social and political history of measurement standardization, and incorporates a range of cinematographic techniques, including photogrammetry and 360-degree cameras.

In November 2023, the third film in their trilogy My Want of You Partakes of Me was screened at Tate Modern.

== Filmography ==
Year	Title	Contribution
TBH	My Want of You Partakes of Me	Director, editor, cinematographer and producer
2022	Constant	Director, editor, cinematographer and producer
2020	A Demonstration	Director, writer, editor
2018	Outside	Director, writer, editor, cinematographer and producer
2017	We're All Here	Director, writer, editor and producer
2017	Eye Farm	Director, writer, editor, cinematographer and producer

== Publications ==
- 2021 – All Thoughts Fly: Monster, Taxonomy, Film (co-written with Sasha Litvintseva)
- 2011 – Part-Time Pioneer

== Awards and nominations ==
Year	Result	Award	Category	Work	Ref.
2023	Won	Academia Film Olomouc	Best Film	Constant	
2022	Won	Guanajuato International Film Festival	Best Documentary Short Film	Constant	
2022	Won	IndieLisboa	Best Short Film	Constant	
2022	Nominated	International Film Festival Rotterdam	Ammodo Tiger Shorts Award	Constant	
2022	Nominated	CPH:DOX	New Vision Award	Constant	
2021	Nominated	La Roche-sur-Yon International Film Festival	Prix Nouvelles Vagues Acuitis	A Demonstration	
2020	Nominated	Berlin International Film Festival	Best Short Film	A Demonstration	
