= Cinéma du Réel =

International festival of documentary films (since 1978)

Cinéma du réel
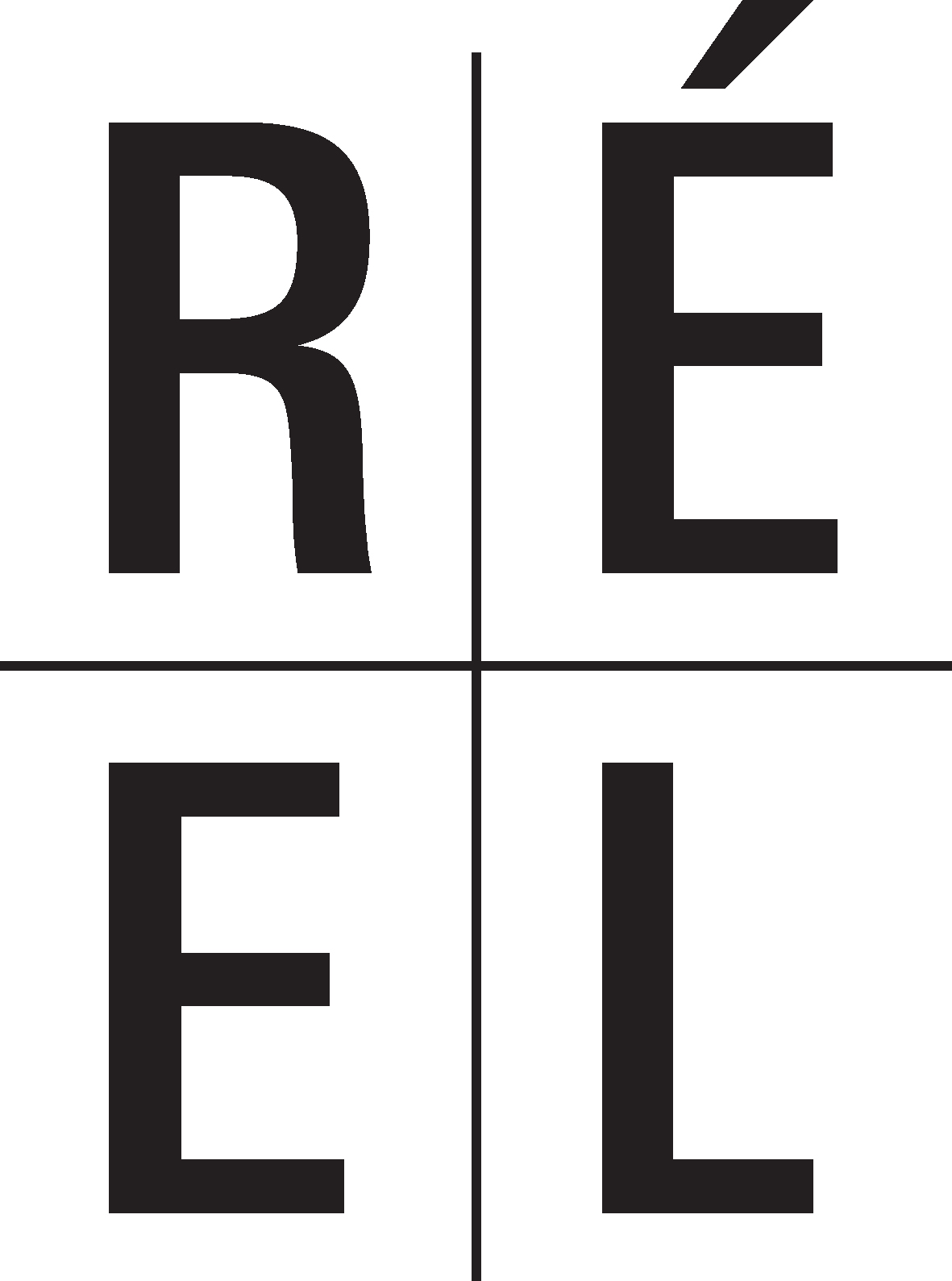

- 2024 Festival poster
- Location: Paris, France
- Founded: 1978
- Most recent: 2024
- Awards: Real Cinema Grand Prize
- Hosted by: Bibliothèque publique d'information (BPI); The association Les Amis du Cinéma du Réel
- Festival date: Opening: 22 March 2025; Closing: 29 March 2025
- Website: www.cinemadureel.org

Current: 47th
- 48th 46th

Cinéma du réel (Lit. "Cinema of the Real") is an international documentary annual film festival held in Paris, France, since 1978. It is organised by the Bibliothèque publique d'information (BPI), and screenings take place at the Pompidou Centre in Paris as well as partner cinemas in the city. The 47th edition of the festival takes place in March 2025.

== History ==
The festival was founded in 1977 by Jean-Michel Arnold and Jean Rouch and the first festival was held in 1978. It was originally called the “L’homme regarde l’homme”.

The 47th edition of the festival takes place in March 2025.

== Description ==
The Cinéma du Réel is organised by the Bibliothèque publique d'information (Bpi; Public Information Library) which is the Pompidou Centre in Paris, and screenings take place at the Bpi as well as other cinemas. The festival presents about 200 films per year in several sections by experienced documentary directors as well as emerging filmmakers.

The event has developed into one of the major documentary film festivals, where public attendees view hundreds of documentaries. It also includes workshops, seminars, and a retrospective program highlighting the best of documentary cinema history.

== Prizes ==
As of 2025 the prizes awarded at the Cinéma du Réel are:

=== Feature films ===
- Grand Prix Cinéma du réel / Cinéma du réel Grand Prize: funded by the BPI (€5,000) and Procirep (Note: PROCIREP (Société des producteurs de cinéma et de télévision) is an organisation dedicated to the collective management of rights, founded by film and television producers.) (€3,000); awarded to a feature film in Competition.
- Prix international Cinéma du réel / Cinéma du réel International Award: funded by the association Les Amis du Cinéma du réel (€5,000); awarded to an international feature film from the Competition
- Prix Cnap du film français / Cnap Award for French films: funded by the Centre national des arts plastiques (€5,000); awarded to a French feature-length film, "to support and promote contemporary artistic production coming from a wide variety of fields and professional backgrounds"
- Prix Sacem / Sacem Award: funded by La Sacem (€1,000); awarded to the composer of original music of a feature film

=== First and short films ===
These prizes are awarded by the short film and first films jury:

- Prix du premier film Loridan-Ivens / First Film Loridan-Ivens Award: funded by Capi Films (€3,500); awarded to a first film with a 50+-minute runtime, featured in competition category. The Loridan-Ivens Award was initiated by Marceline Loridan-Ivens to support emerging committed filmmakers "casting a sharp eye on the state of the world". It is given in honour of filmmaker Joris Ivens, husband of Loridan-Ivens and an early supporter of the project.

This prize was formerly known as the Joris Ivens Prize for a Young Filmmaker, referred to as the Joris Ivens Award. In 2011 the award was worth €7,500, jointly funded by Loridan-Ivens, the Les Amis du Cinéma du réel, and the Joris Ivens European Foundation (Europese Stichting Joris Ivens).

- Prix du court métrage / Short Film Award: funded by the BPI (€2,500)
- Prix Tënk / Tënk Award: funded by Tënk (€500 and acquisition of SVOD broadcasting rights on the Tënk platform); awarded to a short film

=== Parisdoc Awards ===
- Coup de cœur Orlando
- Prix Préludes / Préludes Award
- Prix Route One/DOC / Route One/DOC Award

=== Other prizes ===
- Prix des jeunes – Ciné+ festival / Ciné+ Festival Young Jury Award: funded by Ciné+ Festival and awarded to a feature film; guarantees that the film is bought by the channel for €15,000 and broadcast on Ciné+ Festival (conditions apply)
- Prix des bibliothèques / Library Award: funded by the Direction générale des médias et des industries culturelles of the Ministry of Culture (€2,500); awarded to an international film 50+ minutes long; the film is purchased by the BPI for inclusion in its national catalogue, Les Yeux Doc.
- Prix du patrimoine culturel immatériel / Intangible Cultural Heritage Award
- Prix Clarens du Documentaire Humaniste / Clarens Award for Humanist Documentary Filmmaking
- Prix des Détenus / Inmate Award; created in collaboration with the Fresnes Prison in 2013 and with the Bois D'Arcy Prison in 2017; awarded by a jury of incarcerated people to a short film featured either in competition or in the Première Fenêtre / First Window category
- Prix du Public Première Fenêtre / "First Window" Audience Award

== Past award winners ==
2024:

- Grand Prix: Direct Action (Guillaume Cailleau, Ben Russell)
- International Award: Silence of Reason (Kumjana Novakova)
- Award for French films: Les Mots qu’elles eurent un jour (Raphaël Pillosio)
- First Film Award: The Roller, the Life, the Fight (Elettra Bisogno, Hazem Alqaddi)
- Short Film Award: The Periphery Of The Base (Zhou Tao)
- Librairies Award: Resonance Spiral (Filipa César, Marinho De Pina)
- Inmates Award: Camarades (Ulysse Sorabella)

2023:

- Grand Prix: Coconut Head Generation (Alain Kassanda), and Up the River with Acid (Harald Hutter)
- International Award: Being in a Place: A Portrait of Margaret Tait (Luke Fowler)
- Youth Award: La Base (Vadim Dumesh)
- Short Film Award: Last Things (Deborah Stratman)
- Libraries Award: Adieu Sauvage (Sergio Guataquira Sarmiento)
- Inmates Award: Piblokto (Anastasia Shubina, Timofey Glinin)

2022:

- Grand Prix: Dry Ground Burning (Joana Pimenta, Adirley Queirós Andrade)
- International Award: Mr. Landsbergis (Sergei Loznitsa)
- Youth Award: Xaraasi Xanne, (Raphaël Grisey, Bouba Touré)
- Short Film Award: Urban Solutions (Arne Hector, Luciana Mazeto, Minze Tummescheit, Vinicius Lopes)
- Libraries Award: We, Students! (Rafiki Fariala)
- Inmates Award: Le Croissant de feu (Rayane Mcirdi)

== See also ==
- Cinéma Vérité (film festival), an Iranian documentary film festival
