= Gaspard Glanz =

French journalist

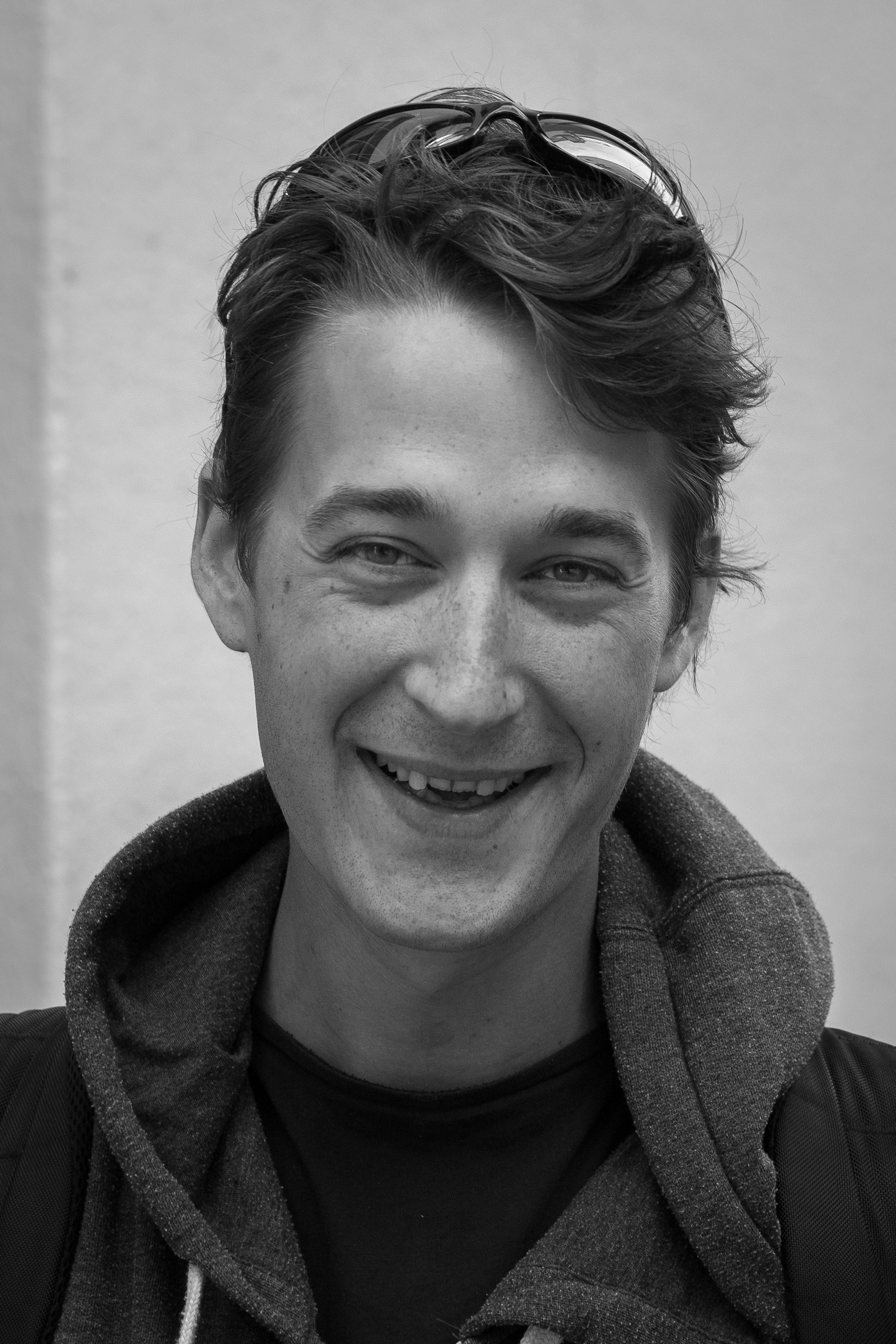
- Gaspard Glanz in 2015
- Born: 22 April 1987 (age 39)
- Occupation: Journalist
- Years active: 2009–present

Gaspard Glanz (born 22 April 1987) is a French videojournalist.

He manages the website Taranis News, which he founded in 2011.

== Early life ==
Gaspard Glanz was born on 22 April 1987 in Strasbourg, France.

He was a student at Lycée Kléber in 2006. He worked as one of the leaders of UNL trade union in Strasbourg during protests against First Employment Contract. He was sentenced for outrage against management and staff of a Strasbourg high school. He obtained a degree in criminal sociology at University of Rennes 2.

He is an autodidact in journalism. He began his career in 2009 during Strasbourg–Kehl summit.

== Career ==
Gaspard Glanz was the founder in 2011 of information website Taranis News, which mostly focuses on news of Social movements, or what he refers to as "street journalism". He films and photographs at ZAD of Sivens Dam and Notre-Dame-des-Landes, the Calais Jungle, Paris while protests against El Khomri law, Nuit debout movement and Yellow vests movement.

Critics question his quality of journalism, in particular the fact that he does not have a press card.

He collaborates as a stringer for online media, such as Rue89 Strasbourg or Reporterre.

During the summer of 2015, he made a film about the exodus of refugees in the Balkans.

In November 2015, while covering a militant action against a bank in collaboration with Rue89 Strasbourg, he was arrested, but refused to give up his images.

Arrested in the Calais Jungle in October 2016, he was arrested and prohibited from staying throughout the Pas-de-Calais. He learned while in custody that he was the subject of a fiche S. According to the newspaper Le Point, Glanz was "sentenced four times, the last in 2017 for theft by the Boulogne-sur-Mer Criminal Court, while covering the evacuation of the Calais jungle". e is accused of stealing a CRS walkie-talkie that he claims to have picked up from the ground.

In 2017, he received threats on social media, after having said that police officers frequently pose as journalists during demonstrations. He is the subject of a fiche S, and denounces a "judicial harassment". In his S sheet, it is noted that he would be "a member of the anarcho-autonomous movement and susceptible to violent action".

In July 2018, images shot by Gaspard Glanz and Clément Lanot entered the record of the parliamentary commission gathered to shed light on the Benalla affair.
