= Direct Action (film) =

2024 documentary film

- Festival release poster
- Directed by: Guillaume Cailleau; Ben Russell
- Produced by: Guillaume Cailleau; Michel Balagué
- Cinematography: Ben Russell
- Edited by: Guillaume Cailleau; Ben Russell
- Production companies: CASKFILMS; Volte Film
- Distributed by: Shellac
- Release date: 21 February 2024 (Berlinale)
- Running time: 216 minutes
- Countries: Germany; France
- Languages: French; Moroccan Arabic

Direct Action is a 2024 French–German documentary film directed by Guillaume Cailleau and Ben Russell. Taking its title from the tactical protest strategy of the same name, the film is a modern portrait of one of the most important militant activist communities in France.

It was selected in the Encounters at the 74th Berlin International Film Festival, where it had its world premiere on 21 February 2024, and won Encounters Best Film. The film was also nominated for the Berlinale Documentary Film Award, and got a Special Mention from jury.

== Contents ==
Direct action is a tactical strategy of protest that seeks to achieve an end directly and by the most effective means.

The documentary film is a result of long-term immersive work, in the line of Jean Rouch as well as Chantal Akerman. It is a contemporary portrait of one of the most notorious and militant activist groups in France: a rural community of 150 people who fought off an international airport project in 2018, established a self-governing zone from 2012 to 2018, endured several brutal attempts of eviction by the French authorities and gave rise to a new environmental movement in 2021. The film uses a cooperative and immersive method to capture the daily lives of a varied network of activists, squatters, anarchists, farmers and those branded by the government as “eco-terrorists”. Does the success of such a radical protest movement provide a way to deal with the climate crisis?

== Production ==
The film is produced by CASKFILMS and Volte Film and distributed by Shellac. The film is made in collaboration with Jeonju International Film Festival (Jeonju Cinema Project), funded by Centre national du cinéma et de l'image animée, Medienboard Berlin-Brandenburg, Region Provence-Alpes-Côte d'Azur, and National Centre for Visual Arts.

== Release ==
Direct Action had its world premiere on 21 February 2024, as part of the 74th Berlin International Film Festival, in Encounters.

The film competed in the 46th Cinéma du Réel Festival competition that took place from 22 to March 31, 2024, in Paris. It was first screened on 24 March 2024 in the festival. The film was also screened in 'Horizons' at the 58th Karlovy Vary International Film Festival on 28 June 2024. It will also be presented in 'Strands: Experimenta' section of the 2024 BFI London Film Festival on 19 October 2024. It also made it to Currents section of 2024 New York Film Festival and was screened at the Lincoln Center in October 2024. On 1 November 2024, the film will be showcased at the 37th Tokyo International Film Festival in 'World Focus' section.

It will be released in French theaters on 20 November 2024 by Shellac films.

== Reception ==
Fabien Lemercier reviewing the film at Berlinale for Cineuropa wrote, "Ben Russell and Guillaume Cailleau immerse themselves in the Zadist movement based in Notre-Dame-des-Landes for a hypnotic documentary featuring radical artist parties." Commenting on the length of the film Lemercier wrote, "Overall, the film does require a little patience," but then praising the cinematographer he stated, "it proves to be a magnetic cinematographic approach depicting the diversity and firmly entrenched identity of a group of activists living (and acting) in accordance with their beliefs." Concluding Lemercier wrote, "it’s first and foremost an original artistic gesture which is perfectly in keeping with its subject-matter, like a lookout creating their own space-time."

=== Accolades ===
In August 2024, the film was selected for nomination to 37th European Film Awards to be held at Kultur- und Kongresszentrum Luzern in Lucerne on 7 December 2024.

Award	Date of ceremony	Category	Recipient	Result	Ref.
Berlin International Film Festival	25 February 2024	Encounters Golden Bear Plaque for Best Film	Guillaume Cailleau and Ben Russell	Won	
Berlin International Film Festival	25 February 2024	Berlinale Documentary Film Award: Special Mention	Guillaume Cailleau and Ben Russell	Won	
Cinéma du Réel	2 April 2024	Cinéma du réel Grand Prix	Direct Action	Won	
