= Aéroport du Grand Ouest =

The Grand Ouest Airport, or Aéroport du Grand Ouest Project was a project for a new airport, to be situated 30 km (20 mi) to the north-west of the French city of Nantes in the commune of Notre-Dame-des-Landes. It was intended for the new airport to replace Nantes Atlantique Airport as the airport for Nantes, but also to serve as an international gateway for western France.

== History ==
The €580 million project was approved in February 2008, with construction expected to start in 2014 and an opening date in 2017. Initially the airport was planned to have a capacity of four million passengers a year, increasing to nine million by 2050. This compares with the current capacity at Nantes Atlantique of three million passengers a year, a capacity that it is claimed cannot be increased because of the proximity of the airport to the city centre (a distance of only 8 km (5 mi)). Opponents claimed that Nantes Atlantique can increase its capacity to 4 million passengers a year.

The new airport was planned to have two runways, and to be linked to the French motorway and rail networks.

The airport was met with strong opposition, notably led by The Greens, Ségolène Royal and Arnaud Montebourg, even though the French Socialist Party supported it. Various groups also set up numerous protest camps and squats around the area that will be built upon known as the "ZAD" (acronym of "Zone to Defend").

=== Consultation ===
A consultation was organised 26 June 2016 at the request of the French government. The population of Loire-Atlantique approved the transfer of Nantes Atlantique Airport in the town of Notre-Dame-des-Landes. Official results (communicated by the prefecture of Loire-Atlantique):

	Votes	%
Favourable towards new airport	268 981	55.17%
Unfavourable towards new airport	218 537	44.83%
Votes cast	487 518	100.00%
Blank vote	3112	
Null vote	2851	
Voters	493 481	51.08%
Abstention	472 535	48.92%
Registered	966 016	

=== Cancellation ===
On 17 January 2018, prime minister Édouard Philippe announced that the airport project was definitively cancelled.
