= Zone to Defend =

French sites occupied by citizens to resist development projects

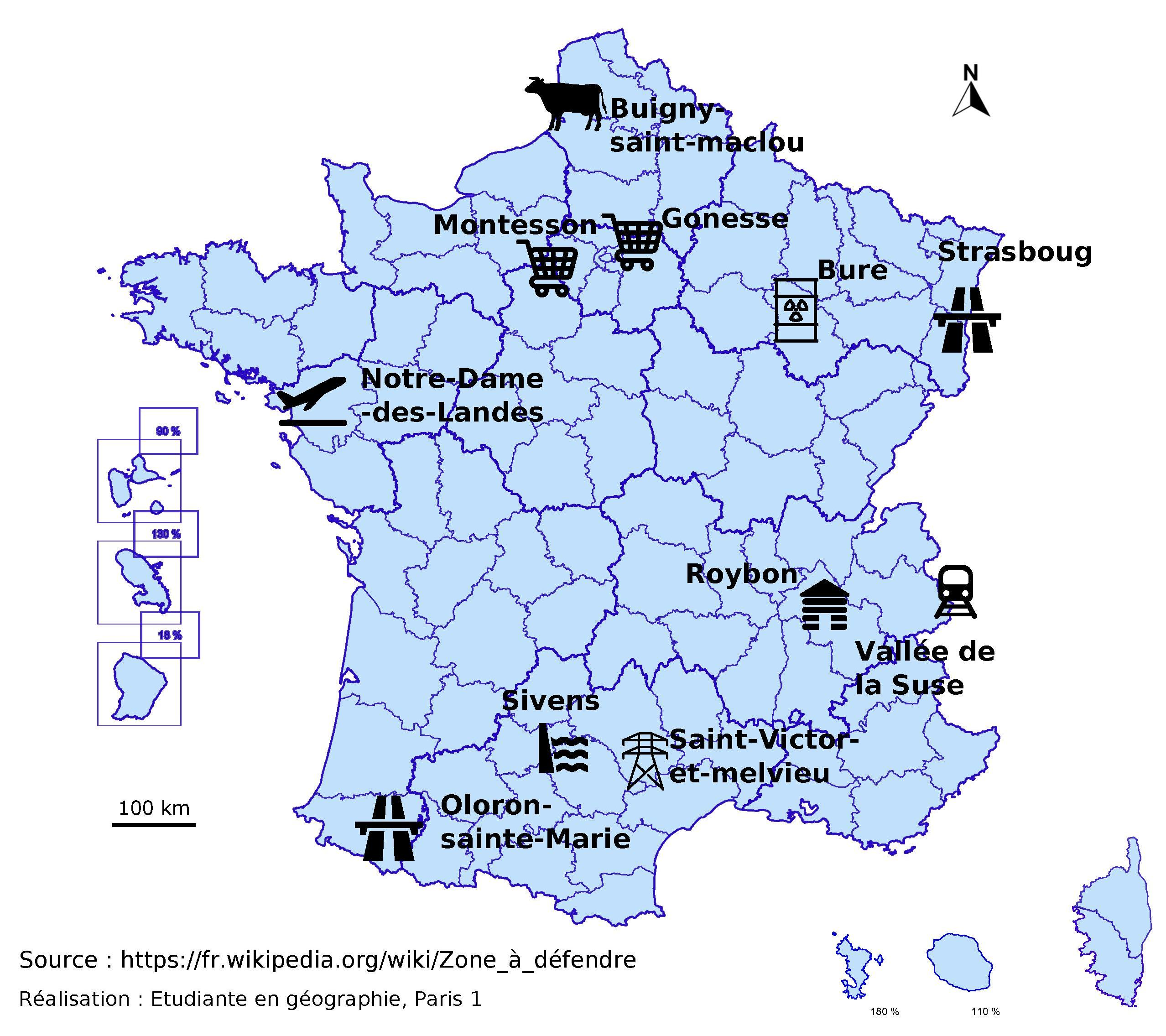
A 2019 map showing the location of various ZADs in France

Zone to Defend or ZAD (French: zone à défendre) is a French neologism used to refer to the site of an activist occupation that is intended to physically blockade a development project. By squatting the land, activists aim to prevent the project from going ahead. The acronym "ZAD" is a détournement of "deferred development area" (from French: zone d'aménagement différé). The ZADs are organized particularly in rural areas with an ecological or agricultural dimension, although the name has also been used by occupations in urban areas, for example in Décines-Charpieu and Rouen.

The most notable example is the ZAD de Notre-Dame-des-Landes which helped a broader campaign to defeat the Aéroport du Grand Ouest, a proposed airport in Notre-Dame-des-Landes, north of Nantes. The ZAD du Testet existed from 2011 until 2015 and prevented a dam from being constructed. Evicted ZADs have amongst other things contested the construction of an electricity substation, a motorway and a facility for the storage of nuclear waste. There have been ZADs in the departments of Aveyron, Bas-Rhin, Doubs, Isère, Loire-Atlantique, Meuse, Seine-Maritime, Tarn and Yvelines. The occupation of the Hambach Forest in Germany and the No TAV movement in Italy have both been compared to ZADs. The ZAD de la Colline was the first Swiss Zone to Defend.

== History ==
The acronym "ZAD" meaning "zone to defend" (French: "zone à défendre") is a détournement of "deferred development area" (French: "zone d'aménagement différé"). In 2015, the French term "zadiste" (English: Zadist) entered the 2016 edition of Le Petit Robert dictionary as "a militant occupying a ZAD to oppose a proposed development that would damage the environment." The ZADs are organized particularly in areas with an ecological or agricultural dimension. The name has also been used by occupations in urban areas, for example in Rouen and in Décines-Charpieu.

Appearing in France in the early 2010s, the term was first popularized during the opposition to the airport construction project in Notre-Dame-des-Landes. In France, the most famous antecedents of the ZAD movement are the Larzac struggle (1971–1981), the protests against the proposed nuclear power plant at Creys-Malville, in Isère (1977), and at Plogoff in the 1970s and 1980s.

One of the movement's first slogans was "ZAD everywhere" (French: "Zad Partout") and though there are no official figures, in early 2016 La Gazette des Communes estimated there to have been at least a dozen ZADs across France since 2009. In other countries there are projects similar to the ZAD concept, such as the occupation of the Hambach Forest in Germany, the No TAV movement in the Susa Valley in Italy and the Grow Heathrow squat protesting against the expansion of Heathrow Airport in London.

== Initiatives ==
The ZADs have multiplied in France after the state's failed eviction of the protest occupation at Notre-Dame-des-Landes in the autumn of 2012. One of the first to be set up afterwards was the ZAD de la ferme des Bouillons near Rouen. In addition to Notre-Dame-des-Landes ZAD, the best-known cases are the opposition to: the Sivens dam project in Tarn where the activist Rémi Fraisse was killed by the French police; the proposed Center Parcs project in the forest of Chambaran in Isère; a nuclear waste storage project called Cigéo (French: Centre industriel de stockage géologique) in Bure.

Activists began a solidarity project called ZAD Patate in 2013, which opposed the destruction of market gardens on the plain of Montesson. In the Yvelines department, twenty kilometres to the west of central Paris, 400 small holdings were producing half of all the salad greens consumed in the capital. In 2014, plans to expand the commercial zone were halted, but the guerrilla gardening continued. The gardens have been sabotaged several times: an orchard of thirty fruit trees was cut down and a field of potatoes was destroyed.

The ZAD de Sainte-Colombe-en-Bruilhois was set up near Agen to prevent the development of a business park in December 2014. The Zadists were invited on to land by a local farmer and slowly expanded onto neighbouring lots. They demanded that 220 hectares of agricultural land be preserved. Most of the ZAD was evicted in May 2016, but the land of the farmer still needed to be expropriated, since he refused to sell it.

Not all ZADs involve permanent occupations. The ZAD du Triangle at Gonesse, to the north of Paris, was set up to counter plans by Auchan and Wanda Group to build a shopping centre called EuropaCity. A collective to protect the triangle of land at Gonesse was formed in 2011 and at times, for example in October 2019, tent occupations were used as part of the tactics to resist construction. As of 2020, the EuropaCity plans had been scrapped but activists were still wary of other developments. Local people in Brueil-en-Vexin camped on land for a weekend in 2019 to show opposition to plans to dig limestone quarries on agricultural land. A ZAD was discussed but not implemented. By September 2020, the plans were still under discussion and the activists restated their intention to create a ZAD if circumstances required it.

Activists attempted to set up a ZAD in March 2016 to resist the construction of a quarry for a new motorway in the Bager forest, which is located at Oloron-Sainte-Marie, in the Pyrénées-Atlantiques department near to the border with Spain. The mayor issued a byelaw forbidding camping and the police prevented them from founding a camp. By 2017, the ZAD had been initiated and it was still in existence in 2019.

After a demonstration of 2,500 people in October 2019 against a proposed marina, the ZAD de la Dune at Bretignolles-sur-Mer was founded. It was evicted in April 2020 when police took twenty Zadists away from the site to make identity checks and the mayor together with 70 local people went onto the site and burnt down all the structures. The mayor's actions were condemned by other politicians as reckless, particularly since restrictions were in place due to the COVID-19 pandemic. A ZAD in Ardèche was evicted in June and the local prefect said she would not tolerate any such project. In December 2019, residents of Entraigues-sur-la-Sorgue in Vaucluse set up the ZAD du Plan d’Entraigues-sur-la-Sorgue without occupying any land. They were concerned about a development plan which would build a prison and a landfill site.

A ZAD was occupied in Besançon in July 2020. The ZAD du Carnet was occupied in late August in order to stop the preparatory works for the expansion of the port of Saint-Nazaire in the Loire-Atlantique department. The site is between Frossay and Saint-Viaud. Activists voiced their concerns about destruction of 110 hectares of wetlands beside the Loire river.

== Notable projects ==
Zone to Defend
Site	Department	Opposed to	Chrononology	Result	Reference
ZAD de l'Amassada	Aveyron	Construction of electricity substation	2014–2019	ZAD evicted	
ZAD de Bure	Meuse	Expansion of existing nuclear waste storage facility	2015–2018	ZAD evicted	
ZAD de la Colline	Canton of Vaud, Switzerland	Expansion of cement quarry	2020–2021	ZAD evicted	
ZAD du Carnet	Loire-Atlantique	Destruction of wetlands for port expansion	2020–	Ongoing	
ZAD de la ferme des Bouillons	Seine-Maritime	Destruction of farmland for a shopping centre	2012–2015	ZAD evicted, farmland saved	
ZAD du Moulin	Bas-Rhin	Proposed motorway in Strasbourg	2017–2018	ZAD evicted	
ZAD de Notre-Dame-des-Landes	Loire-Atlantique	Destruction of farmland for an airport	2009–	Airport cancelled	
ZAD Rhineland	North Rhine-Westphalia in Germany	Expansion of Garzweiler surface mine	2020–	Ongoing	
ZAD de Roybon	Isère	Destruction of forest for a Center Parcs	2014–	Development cancelled	
ZAD du Testet	Tarn	Proposed Sivens dam	2011–2015	Development cancelled	
ZAD de Vaites	Doubs	Destruction of wetlands for housing	2020–	Ongoing	

=== L’Amassada ===
The ZAD de l'Amassada at Saint-Victor-et-Melvieu, in the Aveyron department, was set up in December 2014 to oppose the construction of an electricity substation required by RTE (Réseau de Transport d'Électricité) to distribute the electricity generated by renewable sources, mainly wind turbines. The word "amassada" means "assembly" in the Occitan language. There was a "windy week" in 2016, in which more cabins were built on the terrain of 7 hectares, with people coming to help out from other ZADs such as Bure, Roybon and the Susa Valley. As a way to slow down the progress of the project, 136 people became individual owners of plots over 3,300m² of land and thus would have to be bought out individually by RTE, a subsidiary of EDF (Électricité de France).

RTE obtained a declaration of public utility for the project in June 2018, which meant they could evict the site. Then in January 2019, the squatters were given an eviction order and warned that they would be fined 2000 euros for every day that they stayed. A police raid in February resulted in the arrest of five people on the site, with other people remaining to ensure it was not evicted. Before their trial in July, two of the five were forbidden from entering the ZAD and three from entering Aveyron. In October 2019, the ZAD was evicted. A protest march in November brought 300 people bearing flowers to the site. The police used tear gas to disperse the crowd and arrested several people.

=== Bure ===
The ZAD at Bure, in the Meuse department, protested against the expansion of a nuclear waste storage facility known as the Meuse/Haute Marne Underground Research Laboratory. Every year, the French nuclear energy industry produces around 13,000 cubic metres of radioactive waste (this equates to 2 kg for every French person or enough to fill 120 double-decker buses). Subject to state approval, all this waste will be stored underground at Bure from 2025 onwards. Since 2004, there has been an anti-nuclear Maison de la Résistance (House of Resistance) in the centre of Bure since 2004, which acts as headquarters for the protests. Land in the forest of Mandres-en-Barrois, which would be destroyed by the construction, was occupied in 2015.

At a demonstration in 2017, the police used a water cannon and fired tear gas canisters and stun grenades. There were 30 wounded demonstrators, of which three were hospitalised. One of them, a 27-year-old man, was struck by an exploding GLI-4 grenade on his foot. It made a hole 13 centimetres long and 3 centimetres deep. The occupation at Mandres-en-Barrois was evicted in 2018. Thirty people had been living there and they retreated to the Maison de la Résistance. The Minister of the Interior at the time, Gerard Collomb, said "We do not want there to be places of lawlessness in France." After the eviction, there were calls to resquat the site and a large police presence remained to counter the threat.

=== Colline ===
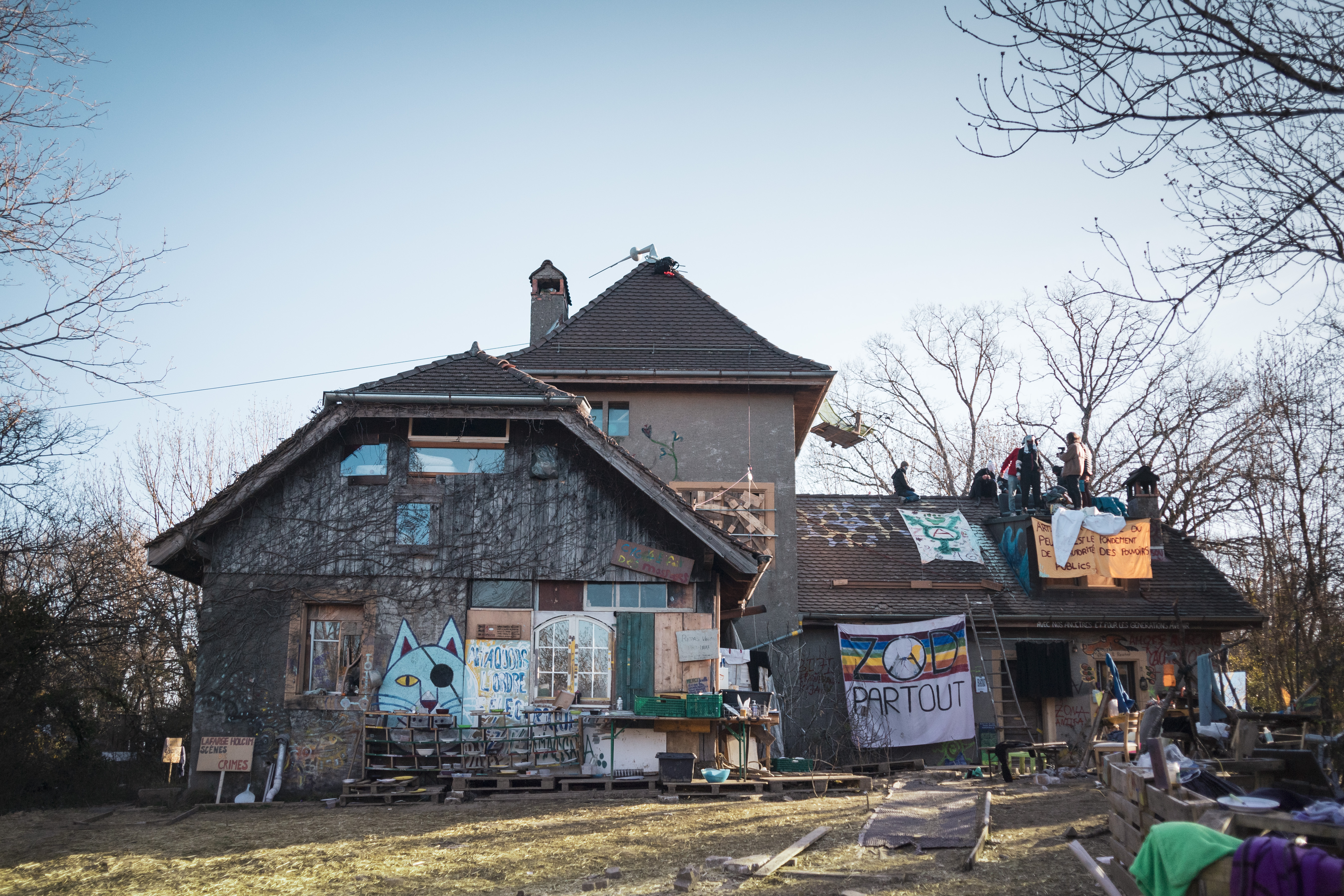
ZAD de la Colline in the Canton of Vaud, Switzerland.

The ZAD de la Colline became the first Swiss ZAD after land at Éclépens in the Canton of Vaud was occupied in October 2020, when environmental activists wanted to prevent the expansion of a quarry run by Holcim. The occupation was supported by an open letter from Jacques Dubochet, a Nobel Prize winning biophysicist. In November 2020, the squatters appealed a decision made by the municipality of La Sarraz to withdraw the permission of residence from a house used as their base. On 30 March 2021, 600 police officers evicted the ZAD, arresting 93 people. Two days later, two activists remained in a tree.

=== Ferme des Bouillons ===
Land located at Mont-Saint-Aignan, in the Seine-Maritime department north of Rouen, was occupied in December 2012 by activists concerned by its sale to Immochan (now part of Auchan), a property development company. It is the last farm on the plateau. The site was four hectares and fifty people turned it into an organic farm, fighting the plan of Immochan to build a shopping centre.

The local council protected the land and in August 2015, Immochan sold the site to a local real estate company which proposed an organic farming project. The ZAD was then evicted by police exercising a 2013 court verdict. The Zadists were unhappy they had not been given an opportunity to buy the land and that their plan had been copied. They remained concerned that the land would be developed.

=== Moulin ===
The ZAD du Moulin was established in 2017 to resist the building of the A355 motorway also known as GCO (French: Grand contournement ouest) near Strasbourg in the Bas-Rhin department. Eight huts were built along the proposed 24 kilometres of the motorway, which was intended as a bypass to reduce congestion on the A35 which dissects Strasbourg. The costs were slated to be over 500 million euros.

The ZAD was evicted by 500 police in September 2018. Members of the European Parliament Karima Delli and José Bové had joined the protestors in solidarity with their struggle to stop the road. Delli was sprayed with tear gas in her face and mouth by the police and fell unconscious. Bové stated "This violence is unacceptable."

=== Notre-Dame-des-Landes ===
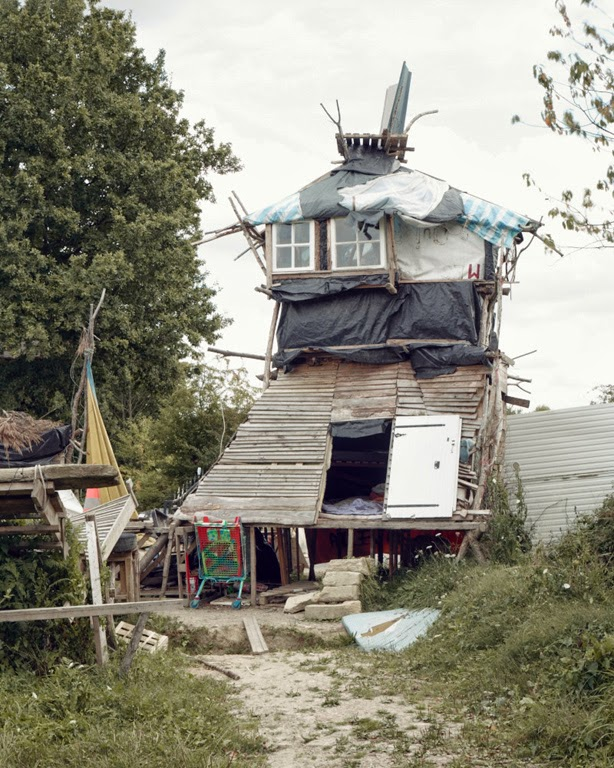
One of the many structures built on roads crossing through the ZAD de Notre-Dame-des-Landes. It serves as a lookout tower in case of eviction (2016).

ZAD Notre-Dame-des-Landes (also known as ZAD NDDL) is the most well-known 'Zone to Defend' in France. Located in the Loire-Atlantique department near to Nantes, it is a very large mostly agricultural terrain of 1,650 hectares (4,100 acres) which became nationally famous and has resisted several concerted attempts by the French state to evict it. The squatters joined the long struggle against an airport, the Aéroport du Grand Ouest (AGO). It was announced in 2018 that the plans for the airport were cancelled and also that the squatters would have until spring to leave.

In April 2018, a largescale eviction operation began as the French state tried to regain control of the autonomous zone. After 10 days (19 April), the police had fired 11,000 projectiles. The eviction was halted on 26 April and said it would be frozen until at least 14 May. The truce came about as representatives of the ZAD negotiated for legal recognition for 28 projects. Some projects agreed to file individual claims, whereas other refused to participate in the process.

=== Rhineland ===
The ZAD Rhineland was formed in 2020 to protect the village of Lützerath in the North Rhine-Westphalia state of Germany from demolition by RWE, which wants to expand the Garzweiler surface mine. The camp was set up on the land of a farmer resisting eviction and from 1 October 2021 onwards, the land had been expropriated by RWE. It is the first explicitly named ZAD in Germany.

=== Roybon ===
The ZAD at Roybon, Isère, between Lyon and Grenoble, was created to oppose the proposed construction of a Center Parcs on the Chambarand plateau. Environmentalists had opposed the project since 2007, represented by the group 'For Chambaran without Center Parcs' (French: Pour les Chambaran sans Center Parcs) or PCSCP. The plans entailed building almost 1000 cottages in the forest. Plans were halted in December 2016, when the Court of Appeal in Lyon stated that two of the three orders permitting construction were illegal. The court agreed with environmentalist concerns regarding wastewater processing from a site with a maximum capacity of 5,600 people and also how the water table would be affected, with 76 hectares of wetland under threat. The court did not agree that the potential loss of protected species outweighed the potential creation of 600 jobs. The owner of Center Parcs, Pierre & Vacances, announced that they would appeal the decision. By 2018, the ZAD had several buildings including the Marquise and Barricade Sud. The thirty inhabitants were planning to construct a strawbale house and were growing vegetables and farming animals. Pierre & Vacances announced in July 2020 that they were scrapping the plans to build and the ZAD responded that after six years it had no intention of disbanding. This angered the mayor of Roybon, who demanded that the camp was evicted.

=== Testet ===
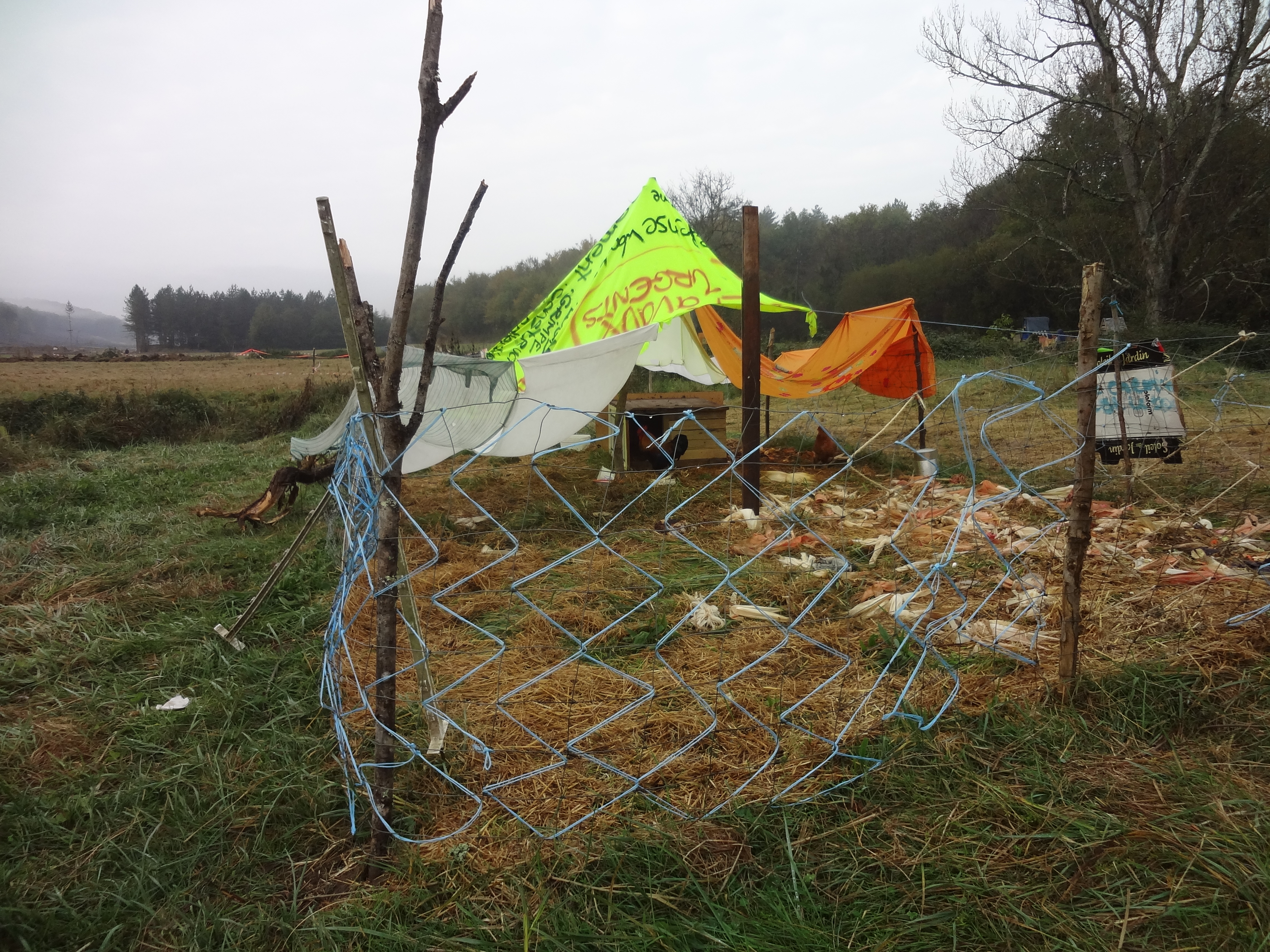
Various makeshift installations are built by the protesters to sustain their occupation of the ZAD, like this hen house at the ZAD du Testet.

The demonstrations to protect the biodiversity of the wetlands in the area threatened by the proposed Sivens Dam resulted in the ZAD du Testet, which existed from 2011 until 2015. It was evicted several times and resquatted. In 2014, botanist Rémi Fraisse was killed by a stun grenade fired by police and the following year the dam was cancelled.

=== Vaites ===
On 17 July 2020, activists from ANV-COP21 and Extinction Rebellion occupied land in Les Vaites on the east side of Besançon, as part of protests against an eco-development of 1150 apartments. Work had started in January 2020 on the site and was then stopped twice by legal challenges from environmental groups. After one month of occupation, the two groups handed over responsibility for the ZAD to the anonymous Zadists squatting the land. The mayor demanded that before negotiating anything, a watchtower built on the land needed to be demolished, but the Zadists refused. In August 2020, the collective of 180 people celebrated their second month of occupation.

== See also ==
- Anarchism in France
- Permanent Autonomous Zone
- Temporary Autonomous Zone
- ZAD Rhineland

== Filmography ==
- Le dernier continent, documentary by Vincent Lapize, À perte de vue & Réel Factory, 77 min, 2015.
- Le tarmac est dans le pré, documentary by de Thibault Férié, Point du jour, 52 min, 2013 (broadcast in October 2013 by France 3).
- Des tracteurs contre des avions, documentary by Christian Baudu, Canal automedia NopubNosub, 31 min, January 2013.
- Notre-Dame-des-Landes, au cœur de la lutte, documentary by Pierrick Morin, 70 min, mars 2012.
- La résistance respire, feature film by Roxane Tchegini, Terre éveillée, 2015.
- A Place to Fight For (Une zone à défendre), feature film by Romain Cogitore, starring François Civil and Lyna Khoudri. Disney+, 2023.
- Return To The Commons, Documentary by Ryan Powell, Novara Media

== Radio ==
- Florian Delorme, Du Rojava à la Zad, l’autogestion en partage, Cultures Monde, Territoires d'exception (4/4), France Culture, 17 May 2018 (in French).
