= Guillaume Cailleau =

French artist and filmmaker

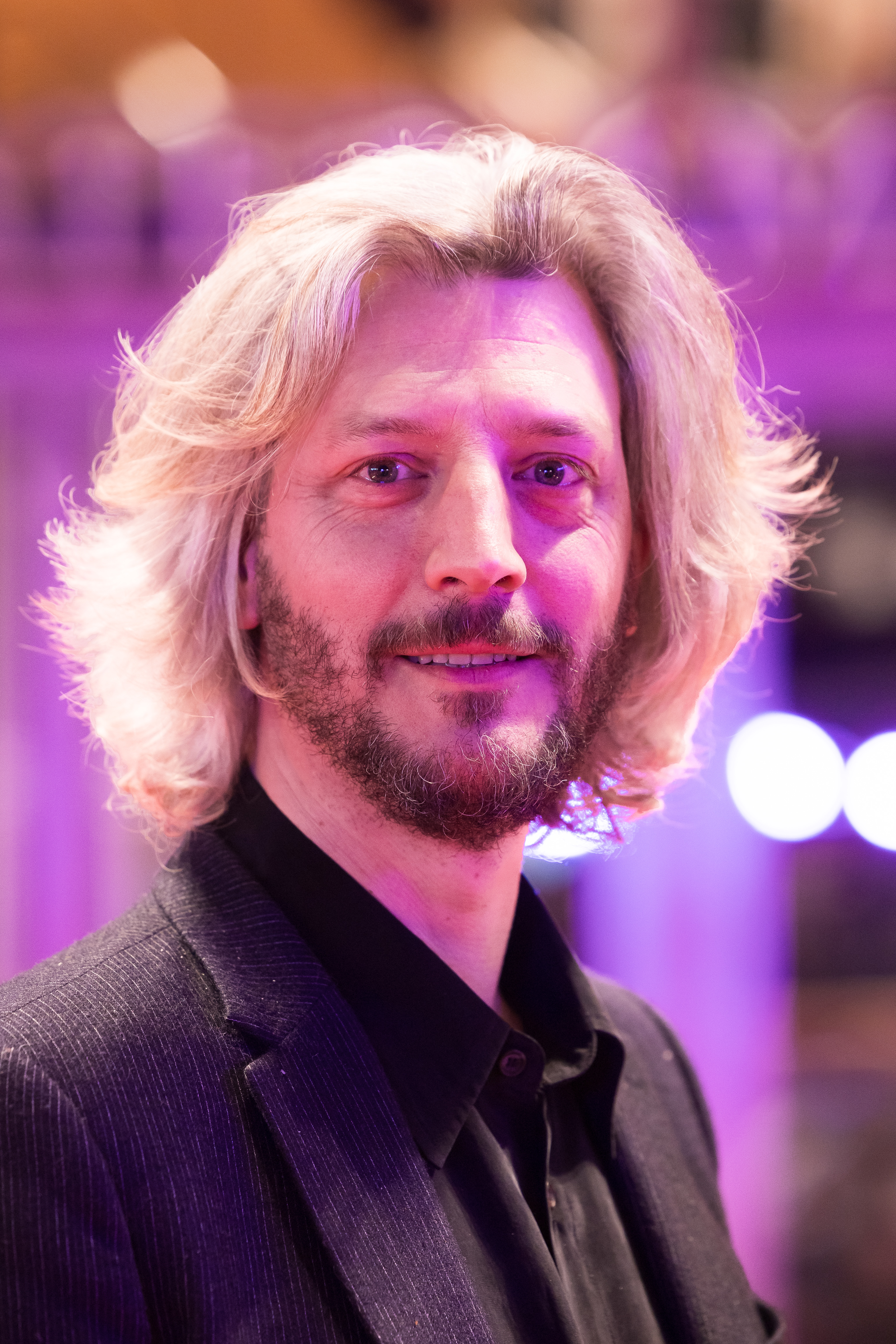
- Born: 15 February 1978 (age 48); Saumur, France
- Education: Berlin University of the Arts

Guillaume Cailleau (born 15 February 1978) is a French artist, filmmaker and producer whose interest lies in exploring new forms to address political and social issues.

== Biography ==
Cailleau was born in Saumur. From 2006 to 2011 he studied at the Berlin University of the Arts and was a postgraduate student under Heinz Emigholz. Before his art studies he graduated as an engineer from Icam in Nantes. He also worked as a cinema projectionist in Paris and Berlin.

In 2007 Cailleau shot his first short film Blitzkrieg, which premiered at the International Short Film Festival Oberhausen. Other films followed, such as Through, a reference to Michael Snow's installation Windowed Water (2007), the manually processed film H(I)J (2009), and Austerity Measures (2012), a collaboration with Ben Russell shot in Athens. In February 2014 Cailleau was awarded a Silver Bear for his short film Laborat at the Berlinale Film Festival. Since 2009 Cailleau has been a member of the independent film collective LaborBerlin. As a freelance video artist, he has worked in theater productions by Thomas Ostermeier, Hakan Savaş Mican und Mala Kline. In addition Cailleau developed numerous audiovisual performances, for instance with the experimental sound artist Werner Dafeldecker and the composer and conductor Timo Kreuser which were featured at international venues such as the Edinburgh International Film Festival (2014), Scratch Expanded Paris (2013) and COLOR SOUND FRAMES (2015) at Serralves Museum.

In addition to his own artistic practice, Cailleau successfully produces films with his company CASKFILMS, collaborating with artists such as Ben Russell, Gustavo Jahn, Sasha Litvintseva & Beny Wagner and Lucile Desamory. Cailleau is co-producer of Ben Russell's Film "Good Luck" (2017), which premiered at the Locarno Festival and was shown as a 4-channel video installation at documenta 14 in Kassel.

== Style ==
Cailleau's work is influenced by American avant-garde cinema and performative practices in expanded cinema. Experimenting with duration, multiple exposures, color separation and manually treated single images, in addition to other methods of image editing, the forms of his films relate directly to their subjects. The process of filmmaking is often foregrounded in the artist's poetic compositions.

== Filmography (selection) ==
- 2007: Blitzkrieg (short film, Premiere 54. International Short Film Festival Oberhausen)
- 2008: Through; with Benjamin Krieg (short film, Premiere 59. Berlinale, Forum Expanded)
- 2009: H(I)J (short film, Premiere NYFF 2009, Views from the Avant-Garde)
- 2012: Austerity Measures; with Ben Russell (Premiere 62. Berlinale, Forum Expanded)
- 2013: Abdou's Dread in Teatro Argentina, Roma (short film, Premiere Edinburgh International Film Festival 2013)
- 2014: Laborat (short film, Premiere 64. Berlinale, Short Film Competition)
- 2014: Hanging (Premiere Kienzle Art Foundation)
- 2016: Organ Movement_For Elmer Kussiac_ (music video, Premiere 62. International Short Film Festival Oberhausen)
- 2019: Wunderschein (short film, Premiere Edinburgh International Film Festival 2019)
- 2020: "A Kind of World War" with Anselm Franke (medium Length, Haus der Kulturen der Welt)
- 2024: Direct Action co-director with Ben Russell

== Installations (selection) ==
- 2010: Un nuage, Temps Organiques, MIRE cinéma expérimental & image en mouvement, Nantes 2012
- 2010: Creative Commons, CONTACT, Royal Ontario Museum Toronto
- 2011: Flowed, Dada Post, Berlin
- 2012: Lucile's Ghost on Atlas Top, Bruxelles, Rencontres internationales Paris/Berlin
- 2013: WILD WILD, mit Hanna Slak, Doppeltes Berlin, Haus der Kulturen der Welt, Berlin
- 2018: FunktionsLust Masons Screen, Wellington, NZ (site specific)
- 2019: WUNDERSCHEIN - Play_Station, Wellington, NZ / Audiofoundation, Auckland, NZ
- 2020 the interest are at stakes, As KREUSER/CAILLEAU with Timo Kreuser, Plesungan Studio SOLO / Goethe House Jakarta/ BACC Bangkok/
- 2020 KELBURN - WIP Mirarnos a los ojos'Bienal de la Imagen en Moviemento, Buenos Aires, Argentina.

== Performances (selection) ==
- 2013 #2.0x, with Jan Slak, Scratch Expanded Paris
- 2015 Resonator II, with Werner Dafeldecker, Serralves Museum
- 2015 Resonator III, with Werner Dafeldecker und Splitter Orchester, Akademie der Künste Berlin, Musik für alle
- 2015 Compound Interest, with Timo Kreuser, Figura Festspiele 2015, Copenhagen
- 2016 Exchange Rates, with Timo Kreuser, Biegungen, Ausland Berlin
- 2019 BESTIMMT as part of IAN WHITE – CINEMA AS A LIVE ART / BECOMING OBJECT, Berlin, DE
- 2019 TOXIC EXCHANGE, As KREUSER/CAILLEAU, NZ tour
- 2019 Eye becomes instrument, Audiofoundation, Auckland, NZ
- 2020 the interest are at stakes, As KREUSER/CAILLEAU with Timo Kreuser, BACC Bangkok & South Asia tour,

== Awards ==
- 2014: Silver Bear Prize of the Jury, 64. Berlinale for Laborat
- 2015: Jury Award Flexfest 2015 for Laborat
- 2016: 2nd Prize, 62. International Short Film Festival Oberhausen for Organ Movement_For Elmer Kussiac_
- 2024: Best Film Award / Encounters, 74. international Berlin Film Festival for DIRECT ACTION
- 2024: Special mention, Berlinale Documentary award, 74. international Berlin Film Festival for DIRECT ACTION
- 2024: Grand Prix, Cinéma du réel 2024, Paris for DIRECT ACTION
