= La Roche-sur-Yon International Film Festival =

Film Festival in La Roche-sur-Yon, France

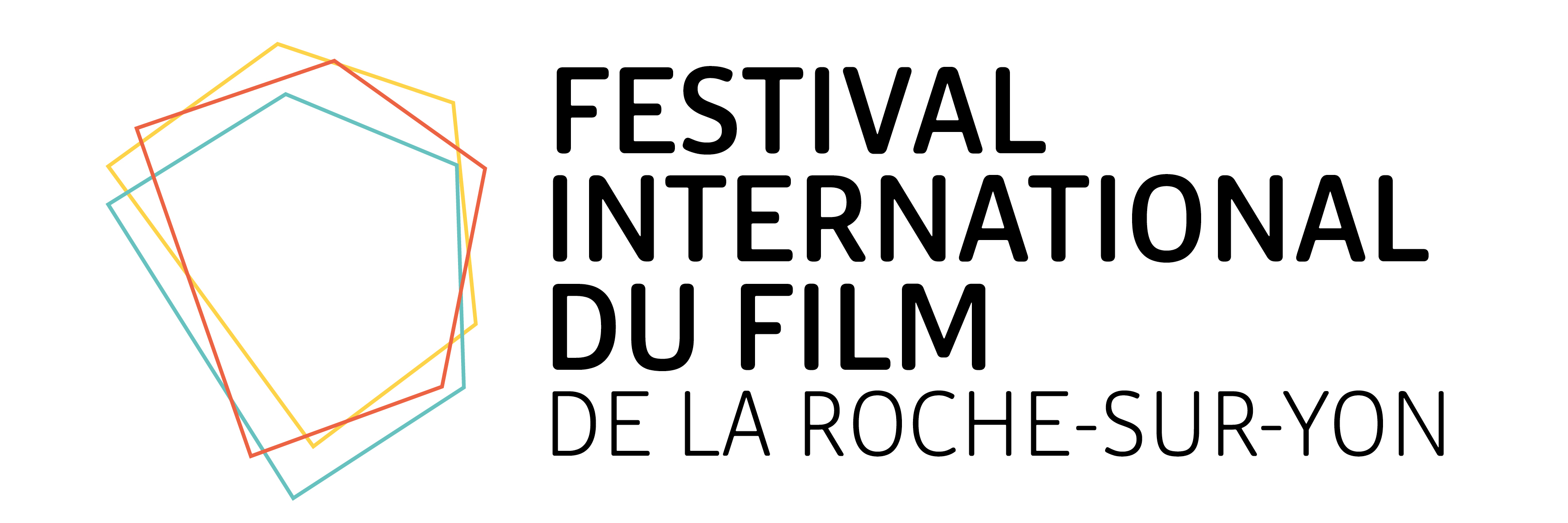
- Location: La Roche-sur-Yon
- Founded: 2001
- Language: International
- Website: fif-85.com

The La Roche-sur-Yon International Film Festival is a film festival created in 2001. Renewed in 2010, it takes place every year in mid-October in the town of La Roche-sur-Yon in Vendée, France. In 2017, it attracted an estimated 24,000 attendees from October 16 to 22, an increase of 10% compared to the year before (22,000).

== Award categories ==
- Special Jury Prize
- Grand Jury Prize CINÉ+
- Mention of the International Competition
- New Wave Awards
- Jury Special Mention News Waves
- Trajectory Awards
- Audience Award
