= Open City Documentary Festival =

Documentary film festival in the UK

- Location: London
- Established: 2010
- Founded by: Michael Stewart
- Directors: María Palacios Cruz
- Producers: Lucy Wardley
- Selector: Oliver Wright
- Website: opencitylondon.com

The Open City Documentary Festival is a London-based documentary film festival currently held in early May. Its mission is to create an open space to support the art of creative documentary and non-fiction filmmakers. The festival offers awards in three categories: Open City Award, given by the Open City jury; Emerging International Filmmaker Award, for first or second-time feature filmmaker; and UK Short Award, for engaging short-forms of a documentary.

The London-based film festival was founded by anthropologist Michael Stewart in 2010. In February 2019, the Open City Documentary Festival launched a development lab for creative documentary makers called Assembly. In September of the same year, Miko Revereza was named the first winner of the initiative. Chilean director Gabriela Pena was awarded in 2020 for her feature Here, The Silence is Heard.

== History ==
=== 2020 Digital Edition ===
In 2020, the Documentary Festival was run digitally, with the conference programmes and documentary screenings hosted on a web-based platform. In lieu of the traditionally physical Expanded Realities exhibition, the organisers chose to showcase a variety of web-based interactive documentaries and essays.

=== 2021 Hybrid Edition ===
In 2021, Open City Documentary Festival ran its first hybrid edition. Taking place physically from the 8–14 September 2021 and digitally from the 13–23 September 2021. For the physical element of the festival screenings took place across various London cinema locations. The conference programme and Expanded Realities exhibition was hosted at the China Exchange in Chinatown.

During the online element of the festival, content was screened using a web-platform to enable viewing from any location.

== Non-Fiction Journal ==
This publication from Open City Documentary Festival aims to create a space for considered, critical and creative writing on non-fiction, featuring contributions offered in response to moving image, audio or cross-media, both contemporary and historical.

The journal is due to be published twice per year with Spring/Summer & Autumn/Winter editions.

== See also ==
- Official website
