= Notre-Dame-des-Landes =

- Commune
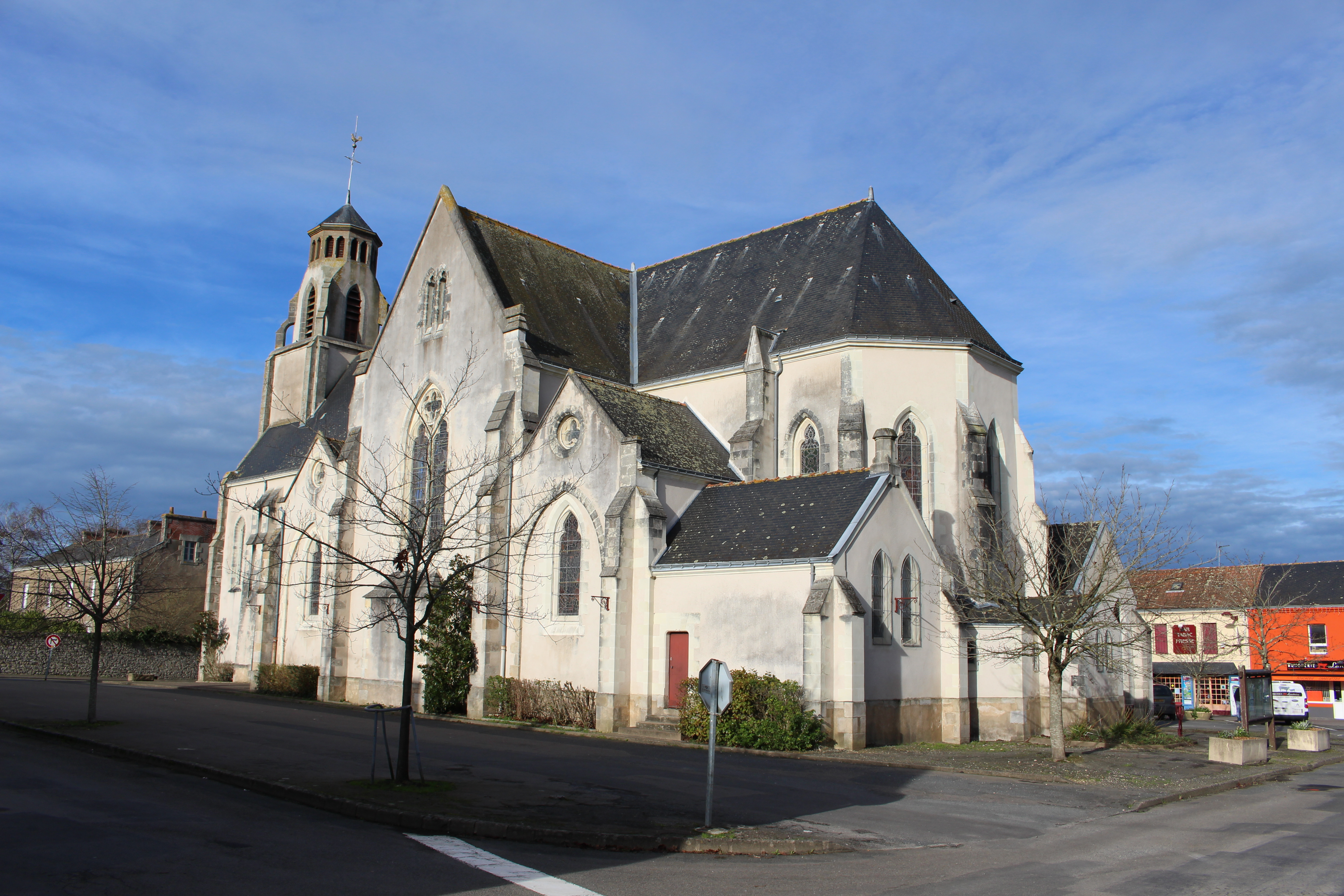

- Coat of arms
- Location of Notre-Dame-des-Landes
- Location within France Location within Pays de la Loire
- Coordinates: 47°22′54″N 1°42′32″W
- Country: France
- Region: Pays de la Loire
- Department: Loire-Atlantique
- Arrondissement: Châteaubriant-Ancenis
- Canton: Nort-sur-Erdre
- Intercommunality: Erdre et Gesvres

Government
  - Mayor (2020–2026): Jean-Paul Naud
- Area^{1}: 37.4 km^{2} (14.4 sq mi)
- Highest elevation: 82 m (269 ft)
- Lowest elevation: 29 m (95 ft)
- Population (2023): 2,360
  - Density: 63.1/km^{2} (163/sq mi)
- Time zone: UTC+01:00 (CET)
  - Summer (DST): UTC+02:00 (CEST)
- INSEE/Postal code: 44111 /44130
- ^{1} French Land Register data, which excludes lakes, ponds, glaciers > 1 km^{2} (0.386 sq mi or 247 acres) and river estuaries.

Notre-Dame-des-Landes (French pronunciation: [nɔtʁ(ə) dam de lɑ̃d]; Breton: Kernitron-al-Lann) is a commune in the Loire-Atlantique department in western France located about 20 km northwest of Nantes.

The commune was the planned site of the new Aéroport du Grand Ouest, intended to replace Nantes Atlantique Airport. The €580 million project was approved in February 2008, with construction then expected to start in 2012 and an opening date in 2015. It was abandoned by the government of Emmanuel Macron on 17 January 2018 in the face of strenuous local opposition.

In an ongoing week-long incident in April 2018 more than 2,500 riot police were deployed to remove the occupants of the fields in Notre-Dame-des-Landes that have been described as an anarchist utopia.

As in previous days, officers clashed with activists trying to maintain a camp that sprang up almost a decade ago and which they have named a Zone à Défendre (ZAD), or defence zone.

Riot police officers used grenades which hurt both inhabitants and journalists. Riot police officers came under a hail of stones and other projectiles and one was taken to hospital with wounds after being hit by a homemade explosive device. Journalists were prevented from filming the incidents by riot police.

== Population ==
Historical population

Year	Pop.	±% p.a.
1872	1,785	—
1901	1,814	+0.06%
1926	1,525	−0.69%
1946	1,403	−0.42%
1962	1,187	−1.04%
1968	1,127	−0.86%
1975	1,112	−0.19%

Year	Pop.	±% p.a.
1982	1,274	+1.96%
1990	1,527	+2.29%
1999	1,649	+0.86%
2007	1,875	+1.62%
2012	2,008	+1.38%
2017	2,184	+1.69%
2023	2,360	+1.30%

Source: EHESS and INSEE (1968-2023)

== See also ==
- Communes of the Loire-Atlantique department
- Zone to Defend
