= Ben Russell (filmmaker) =

American artist and experimental filmmaker

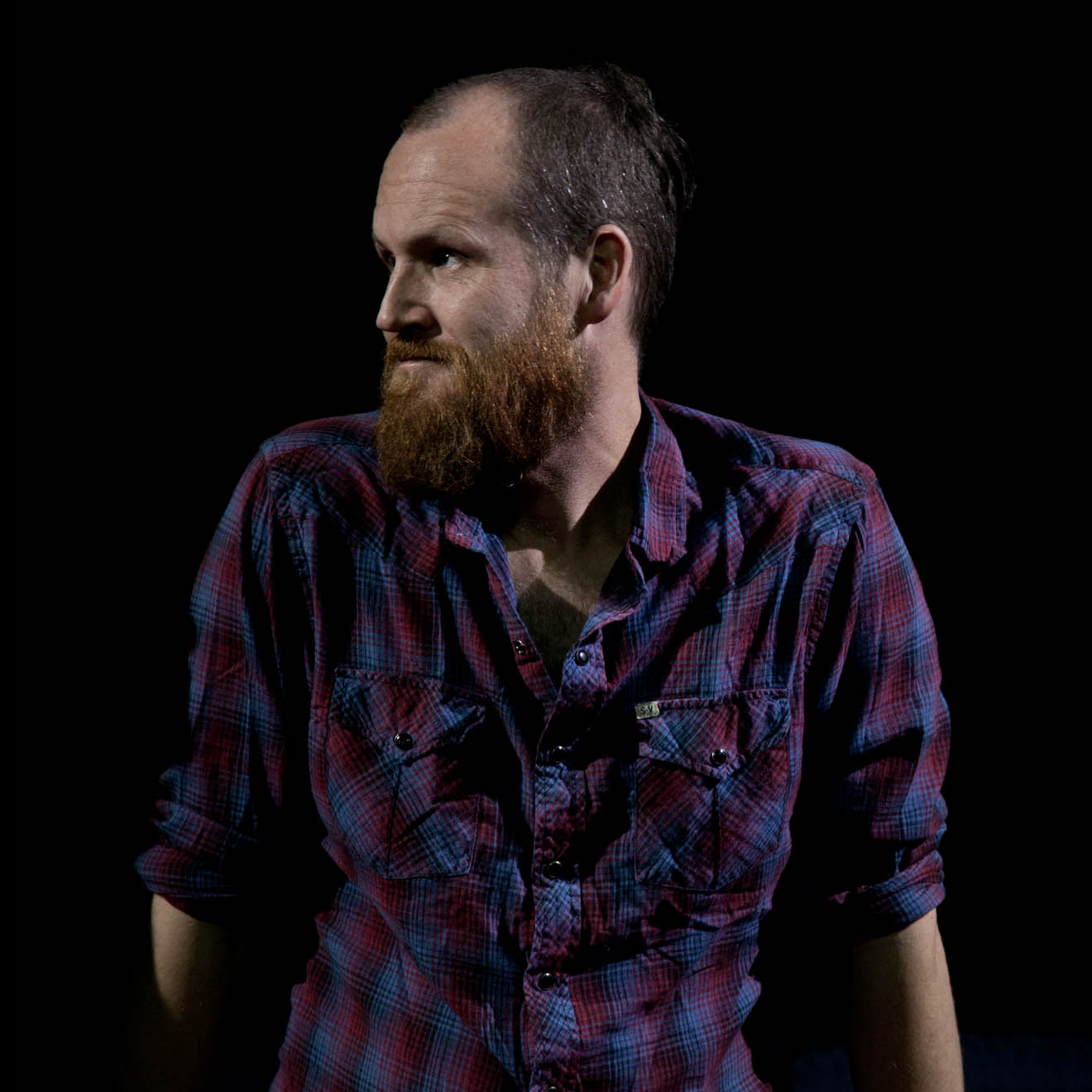
Russell in 2014

Ben Russell (born 1976) is an American artist and experimental filmmaker. Russell developed his reputation over the numerous shorts he made throughout the 2000s, many as part of his "Trypps" series, and as the curator of the Magic Lantern Cinema in Providence, Rhode Island. In 2009, he made his acclaimed feature debut, Let Each One Go Where He May, shot in Suriname in a series of 13 long takes accomplished with a Steadicam. Both a Guggenheim Fellow and participating artist in documenta 14, Russell's work has been described as drawing on elements of ethnography, psychedelia and Surrealism.

== Biography ==
Russell attended Brown University from 1994 to 1998, where he received a BA in art and semiotics. It was during his last year at Brown that Russell became interested in filmmaking, and shot his first film on 16mm. Afterwards, Russell traveled to Suriname with the Peace Corps. The experience inspired many of his films, and the country ended up as the setting for his first feature-length work, Let Each One Go Where He May, a film which premiered in the Tiger Awards competition at the 2010 Rotterdam International Film Festival and received the FIPRESCI International Critics Prize.

Early in his career, Russell befriended the English filmmaker Ben Rivers, and the two would later co-program a touring series of their work. They have collaborated on two films together, the feature film A Spell to Ward Off the Darkness (2013) and the experimental short The Rare Event (2018).

Russell's third feature film, Good Luck (2017), premiered in the international competition at the 2017 Locarno Film Festival and was exhibited as a four-channel video installation at documenta 14 in Kassel, Germany. It was voted the "Best Experimental Film of 2017" by the National Society of Film Critics.

Russell received an MFA in film and video from The School of the Art Institute of Chicago in 2003. From 2006-2011, he was assistant professor at the University of Illinois at Chicago.

== Filmography ==
- 2024: Direct Action co-director with Guillaume Cailleau
- Color-Blind (2019)
- The Rare Event (2018)
- Good Luck (2017)
- He Who Eats Children (2016)
- YOLO (2015)
- Greetings to the Ancestors (2015)
- Atlantis (2014)
- A Spell to Ward off the Darkness (2013)
- Let Us Persevere In What We Have Resolved Before We Forget (2013)
- Ponce de León (2012)
- Austerity Measures (2012)
- River Rites (2011)
- Trypps #7 (Badlands) (2010)
- Trypps #6 (Malobi) (2009)
- Let Each One Go Where He May (2009)
- Rock Me Amadeus by Falco via Kardinal by Otto Muehl (2009)
- Trypps #5 (Dubai) (2008)
- Black and White Trypps Number Four (2008)
- Tjúba Tén / The Wet Season (2008)
- Workers Leaving the Factory (Dubai) (2007)
- Black and White Trypps Number Three (2007)
- Black and White Trypps Number Two (2006)
- Black and White Trypps Number One (2005)
- The Red and the Blue Gods (2005)
- The Twenty-One Lives of Billy the Kid (2005)
- Last Days (2004)
- The Ataraxians (2004)
- Extra Terrestrial (2004)
- The Tawny (2003)
- Terra Incognita (2002)
- The Quarry (2002)
- The Breathers-In (2002)
- Daumë (2000)
- The Death of Abraham Lincoln (in Three Parts) (1998)
