= 48th Hong Kong International Film Festival =

Film festival in Hong Kong

- HKIFF official poster
- Opening film: All Shall Be Well by Ray Yeung
- Closing film: All the Long Nights by Sho Miyake
- Location: Hong Kong Cultural Centre, Hong Kong Arts Centre, Hong Kong City Hall, M+, iSQUARE, Times Square, Elements
- Founded: 1977
- Awards: Firebird (Chinese-language): Snow in Midsummer by Chong Keat Aun; Firebird (World): Sons by Gustav Möller; Firebird (Documentary): Favoriten by Ruth Beckermann
- Hosted by: Supported by: The Hong Kong International Film Festival Society; Create Hong Kong
- No. of films: 190
- Festival date: Opening: March 28, 2024; Closing: April 8, 2024
- Website: HKIFF 2024

Hong Kong International Film Festival
- 49th 47th

The 48th Hong Kong International Film Festival (Chinese: 第48屆香港國際電影節) took place from 28 March to 8 April 2024. Fruit Chan was selected as the Filmmaker in Focus for this edition and masterclasses led by Víctor Erice and Martin McDonagh were featured.

The festival opened with the Hong Kong LGBTQ-themed drama All Shall Be Well by Ray Yeung and closed with the Japanese drama All the Long Nights by Sho Miyake. This year, 190 films from 62 countries were screened, including five world premieres, six international premieres, and sixty-four Asian premieres. Karena Lam was chosen as the new ambassador of the HKIFF starting this edition, succeeding Aaron Kwok, who served for the past five years.

== Background ==
The theme of the 48th Hong Kong International Film Festival is "A Portal to Another World". The festival's poster features a Hong Kong street with neon signs as the backdrop, while a brightly colored film screen is placed in the center, reflecting the theme of reimagining Hong Kong through a time portal. Karena Lam was named the new ambassador of the Hong Kong International Film Festival in January 2024 starting from this edition, succeeding Aaron Kwok, who served for the past five years. Lam also served as one of the jurors for the Firebird Awards. She is the second woman to hold this position and the first female ambassador in over a decade (since Miriam Yeung in 2011), and she expressed a commitment to advocating for women's rights in the film industry, as well as promoting Hong Kong's cultural scene, which has faced challenges since the COVID-19 pandemic and the rise of streaming services.

Fruit Chan was announced as the Filmmaker in Focus for the festival on 2 February 2024. Albert Lee, the executive director of the Hong Kong International Film Festival Society, explained that Chan was chosen for his creative and pioneering vision in Hong Kong genre filmmaking. British-Irish filmmaker Martin McDonagh and Spanish director Víctor Erice were also announced as features in the Masterclass section later that month, and both would be presenting at the festival in person. A full lineup and the titles of the competitive sections were revealed on 8 March. Other notable guests at the festival included Iranian actress Zar Amir Ebrahimi, Japanese musician Eiko Ishibashi, American cartoonist Bill Plympton, Indian documentary filmmaker Anand Patwardhan, Taiwanese filmmaker Tsai Ming-liang, Japanese filmmakers Kazuhiro Soda, Shusuke Kaneko, and Sho Miyake, as well as Japanese actors Masaki Okada and Kaya Kiyohara, and Taiwanese actor Greg Hsu. Ishibashi also gave a live performance on 30 March.

The film festival opened on 28 March 2024 at the Hong Kong Cultural Centre with the Hong Kong LGBTQ-themed drama All Shall Be Well, directed by Ray Yeung. Events took place at various venues, including the Hong Kong Cultural Centre, Hong Kong Arts Centre, Hong Kong City Hall, M+, iSQUARE, Times Square, and Elements. A total of 190 films from 62 countries were screened, featuring five world premieres, six international premieres, and sixty-four Asian premieres. Ticket prices ranged from HK$55 for weekday matinee screenings to HK$5,000 for a VIP pass to the festival. The film festival was part of the Entertainment Expo Hong Kong, which celebrated its 20th anniversary, featuring events such as the 17th Asian Film Awards and the 42nd Hong Kong Film Awards taking place concurrently. A new section, the CAA China Genre Initiative Projects, was added to the Asia Financing Forum, Hong Kong International Film Festival's project market.

The Malaysian-Singaporean-Taiwanese historical drama Snow in Midsummer by Chong Keat Aun won the Firebird Award for the Young Cinema Competition (Chinese-language), while the Danish-Swedish psychological thriller Sons by Gustav Möller won the Firebird Award for the Young Cinema Competition (World). The Austrian documentary Favoriten by Ruth Beckermann received the Firebird Award for Documentary Competition. The Taiwanese film A Journey in Spring by Wang Ping-wen and Peng Tsz-hui won the FIPRESCI Prize. The festival closed with the Japanese drama All The Long Nights by Sho Miyake on 8 April.

== Jury ==
The jury of the Firebird Awards comprises:

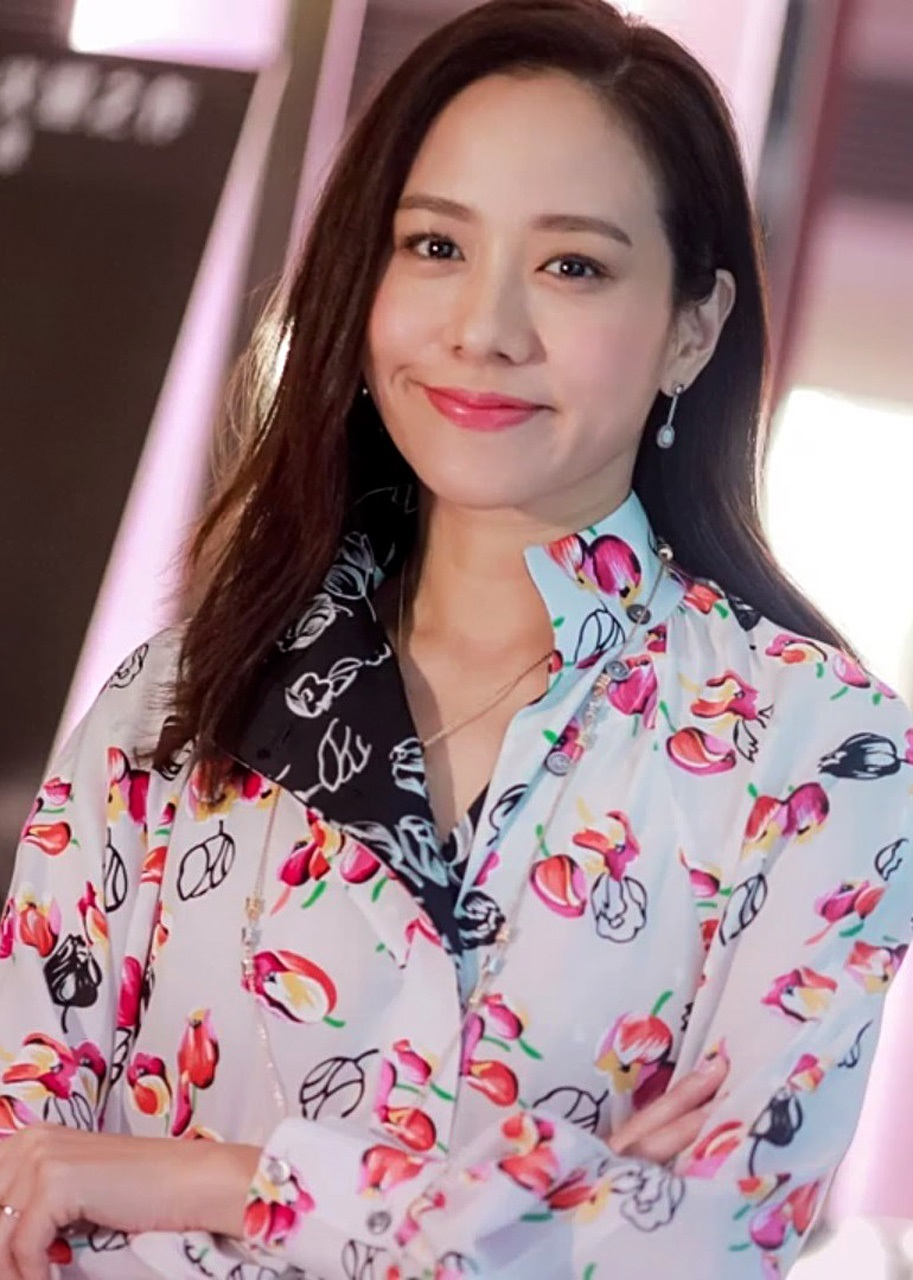
Karena Lam, new HKIFF ambassador

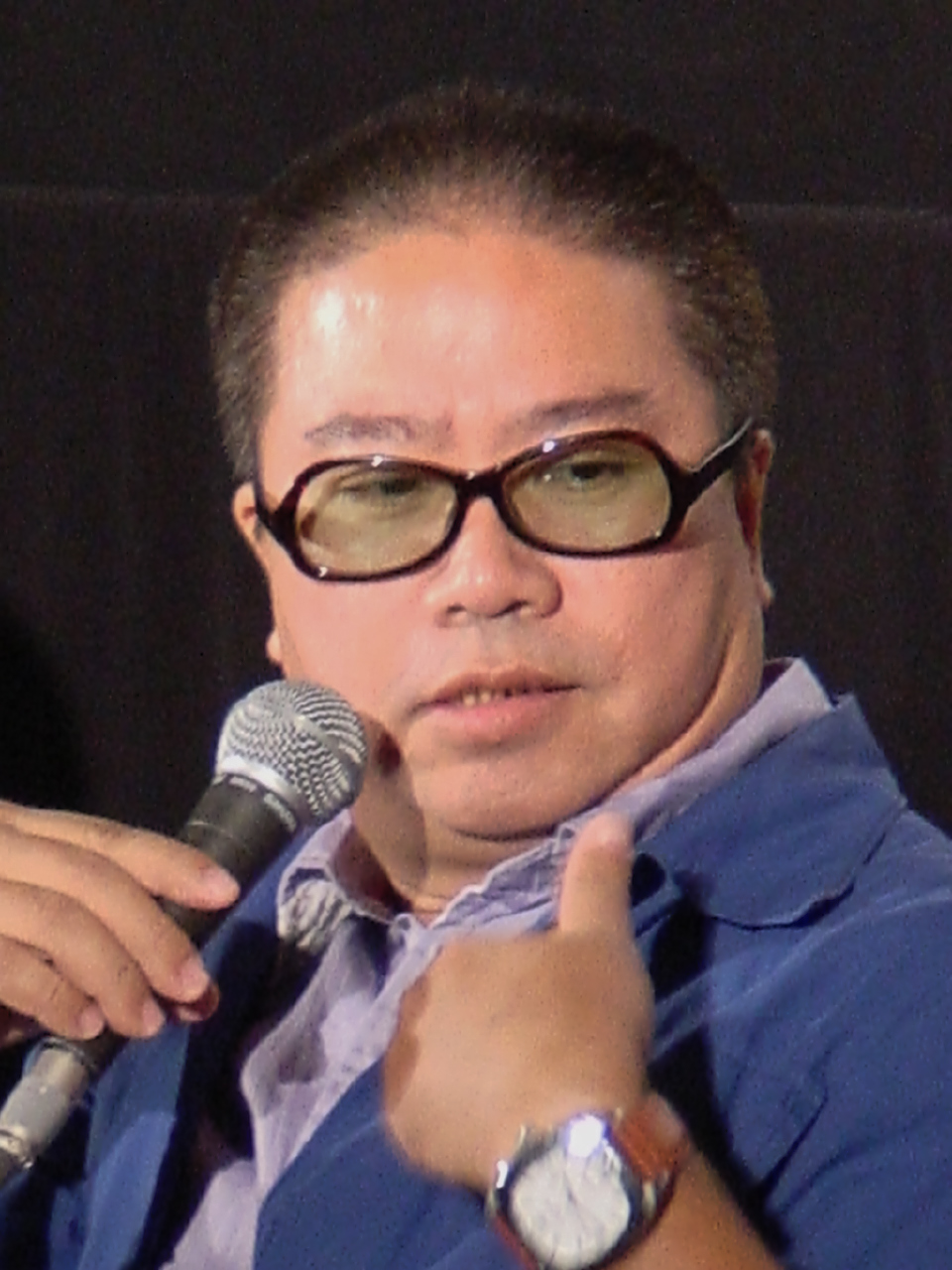
Fruit Chan, Filmmaker in Focus

=== Young Cinema Competition (Chinese-language) ===
- Fruit Chan, Hong Kong filmmaker
- Karena Lam, Hong Kong actress
- Zhang Xianmin, Chinese film scholar and artistic director

=== Young Cinema Competition (World) ===
- Zar Amir Ebrahimi, Iranian actress
- Lila Avilés, Mexican filmmaker
- Derek Tsang, Hong Kong filmmaker
- Carlo Chatrian, former director of the Locarno Film Festival and Berlin International Film Festival

=== Documentary Competition ===
- Lea Glob, Danish documentary filmmaker
- Du Haibin, Chinese documentary filmmaker
- Chen Wanling, former programme director of the Taiwan International Documentary Festival

== Program sections ==
=== Opening and closing films ===
The following films were selected as the opening and closing features of the film festival, marking the Asian premiere of both:

English title	Original title	Director(s)	Production countrie(s)
Opening film
All Shall Be Well	從今以後	Ray Yeung	Hong Kong
Closing film
All the Long Nights	夜明けのすべて	Sho Miyake	Japan

=== Gala Presentation ===
The following films have been selected for screening in the Gala Presentation section, marking the world premiere of Ho Miu Ki's Love Lies and the Asian premiere of Ryusuke Hamaguchi's Gift:

English title	Original title	Director(s)	Production countrie(s)
Exhuma	파묘	Jang Jae-hyun	Korea
Gift	ギフト	Ryusuke Hamaguchi	Japan
Love Lies	我談的那場戀愛	Ho Miu Ki	Hong Kong
The Successor	Le Successeur	Xavier Legrand	France, Belgium, Canada

=== Cinephile Paradise ===
The following films have been selected for screening in the Cinephile Paradise section:

English title	Original title	Director(s)	Production countrie(s)
August My Heaven / Chime	オーガスト・マイ・ヘヴン / Chime	Kudo Riho, Kiyoshi Kurosawa	Japan
The Beast	La Bête	Bertrand Bonello	France, Canada
Dahomey	—N/a	Mati Diop	France, Senegal, Benin
The Dead Don't Hurt	—N/a	Viggo Mortensen	Canada, Mexico, Denmark
Dear Jassi	—N/a	Tarsem Singh	India, Canada, United States
Dying	Sterben	Matthias Glasner	Germany
Io capitano	—N/a	Matteo Garrone	Italy, Belgium, France
Old Fox	老狐狸	Hsiao Ya-chuan	Taiwan
Out of Season	Hors-saison	Stéphane Brizé	France
The Promised Land	Bastarden	Nikolaj Arcel	Denmark, Germany, Sweden
Seven Veils	—N/a	Atom Egoyan	Canada
Tatami	—N/a	Guy Nattiv, Zar Amir Ebrahimi	Georgia, United States

=== Firebird Awards ===
==== Young Cinema Competition (Chinese-language) ====
The following films were selected to compete in the Young Cinema Competition (Chinese-language) at the Firebird Awards. Snow in Midsummer emerged as the winner, with Liang Ming named Best Director for Carefree Days, Lyu Xingchen named Best Actress for her performance in Carefree Days, and Jason King named Best Actor for his role in A Journey in Spring.

English title	Original title	Director(s)	Production countrie(s)
Borrowed Time	人海同遊	Choy Ji	China
Brief History of a Family	家庭簡史	Lin Jianjie	China, France, Denmark, Qatar
Carefree Days	逍遙．遊	Liang Ming	China
Fresh Off Markham	敗走麥城	Kurt Yuen, Cyrus Lo, Trevor Choi	China, Canada
A Journey in Spring	春行	Wang Ping-Wen, Peng Tzu-Hui	China
Snow in Midsummer	五月雪	Chong Keat Aun	Malaysia, Singapore, Taiwan
Some Rain Must Fall	空房間裏的女人	Qiu Yang	China
A Song Sung Blue	小白船	Geng Zihan	China

==== Young Cinema Competition (World) ====
The following films were selected to compete in the Young Cinema Competition (World) at the Firebird Awards. Sons emerged as the winner, with Meryam Joobeur named Best Director for Who Do I Belong To, Minna Wündrich named Best Actress for her performance in Ivo, and Vangelis Mourikis named Best Actor for his role in Arcadia. A special mention was given to Nelson Carlo de los Santos Arias' Pepe.

English title	Original title	Director(s)	Production countrie(s)
Arcadia	—N/a	Yorgos Zois	Greece
Arni	—N/a	Dorka Vermes	Hungary
Ivo	—N/a	Eva Trobisch	Germany
Pepe	—N/a	Nelson Carlo De Los Santos Arias	Dominican Republic, Namibia, Germany, France
Sons	Vogter	Gustav Möller	Denmark, Sweden
Sujo	—N/a	Astrid Rondero, Fernanda Valadez	Mexico, France, United States
The Tenants	세입자	Yoon Eun-kyoung	South Korea
Who Do I Belong To	ماء العين	Meryam Joobeur	Tunisia, France, Canada

==== Documentary Competition ====
The following films were selected to compete in the Young Cinema Competition (Documentary) at the Firebird Awards. Favoriten was unanimously chosen as the winner by the jury, while Wong Siu-pong received the jury prize for his work Obedience.

English title	Original title	Director(s)	Production countrie(s)
Architecton	—N/a	Viktor Kossakovsky	Germany, France
At Averroès & Rosa Parks	Averroès & Rosa Parks	Nicolas Philibert	France
Black Box Diaries	—N/a	Shiori Itō	Japan
Black Snow	—N/a	Alina Simone	United States
Favoriten	—N/a	Ruth Beckermann	Austria
Hollywoodgate	—N/a	Ibrahim Nash’at	Germany, United States
Intercepted	—N/a	Oksana Karpovych	Canada, France, Ukraine
Obedience	十方之地	Wong Siu-pong	Hong Kong

=== Pan-Chinese Cinema ===
==== Filmmaker in Focus ====
Fruit Chan was announced to be the Filmmaker in Focus for the film festival on 2 February 2024, featuring ten of his previous works. The Longest Summer was removed from the list on 8 March, with the Hong Kong International Film Festival Society stating that it was unable to locate suitable copies for screening, and Chan's 2019 film The Abortionist was presented in its place. However, Ming Pao noted that the Society had previously screened The Longest Summer in 2017 and 2021, while filmmaker Tin Kai-man also expressed confusion over the decision, explaining that copies of all Hong Kong films should be well-preserved in the Hong Kong Film Archive. Chan described the decision as "pitiful", but noted that those interested in watching would find a way to do so on their own.

English title	Original title	Director(s)	Year of release	Production countrie(s)
Made in Hong Kong	香港製造	Fruit Chan	1997	Hong Kong
The Longest Summer	去年煙花特別多	Fruit Chan	1998	Hong Kong
Little Cheung	細路祥	Fruit Chan	1999	Hong Kong
Durian Durian	榴槤飄飄	Fruit Chan	2000	Hong Kong
Hollywood Hong Kong	香港有個荷里活	Fruit Chan	2001	Hong Kong
Public Toilet	人民公廁	Fruit Chan	2002	Hong Kong
Dumplings	餃子	Fruit Chan	2004	Hong Kong
The Midnight After	那夜凌晨，我坐上了旺角開往大埔的紅VAN	Fruit Chan	2014	Hong Kong
My City	我城	Fruit Chan	2015	Hong Kong
Three Husbands	三夫	Fruit Chan	2018	Hong Kong
The Abortionist	墮胎師	Fruit Chan	2019	Hong Kong

==== Chinese-language Restored Classics ====
Six restored contemporary classics by Chinese filmmakers were showcased at the film festival:

English title	Original title	Director(s)	Year of release	Production countrie(s)
Dangerous Encounters of the First Kind	第一類型危險	Tsui Hark	1980	Hong Kong
Old Well	老井	Wu Tianming	1987	China
Dislocation	錯位	Huang Jianxin	1986	China
The Story of Qiu Ju	秋菊打官司	Zhang Yimou	1992	China
Mahjong	麻將	Edward Yang	1996	Taiwan
The Wayward Cloud	天邊一朵雲	Tsai Ming-liang	2005	Taiwan

=== Masters and Auteurs ===
==== The Masters ====
The following films were selected for screening in the Masterclass section:

English title	Original title	Director(s)	Production countrie(s)
Abiding Nowhere	無所住	Tsai Ming-liang	United States, Taiwan
Anselm	Anselm – Das Rauschen der Zeit	Wim Wenders	Germany
Essential Truths of the Lake	—N/a	Lav Diaz	Philippines, France, Portugal, Singapore
Fallen Leaves	Kuolleet lehdet	Aki Kaurismäki	Finland, Germany
Green Border	Zielona granica	Agnieszka Holland	Poland, Czech Republic, France, Belgium
Kidnapped	Rapito	Marco Bellocchio	Italy, France, Germany
Kubi	首	Takeshi Kitano	Japan
Menus-Plaisirs – Les Troisgros	—N/a	Frederick Wiseman	United States
The Old Oak	—N/a	Ken Loach	United Kingdom
Socialist Realism	El Realismo Socialista	Raúl Ruiz, Valeria Sarmiento	Chile
A Traveler's Needs	여행자의 필요	Hong Sang-soo	South Korea
Youth (Spring)	青春 (春)	Wang Bing	France, Luxembourg, Netherlands

==== Víctor Erice: The Returning Gaze ====
Spanish director Víctor Erice was selected as the featured honoree for the festival's Masterclass tribute program, showcasing all four of his feature films throughout his filmmaking career:

English title	Original title	Director(s)	Year of release	Production countrie(s)
The Spirit of the Beehive	El espíritu de la colmena	Víctor Erice	1973	Spain
El Sur	—N/a	Víctor Erice	1983	Spain, France
The Quince Tree Sun	El sol del membrillo	Víctor Erice	1992	Spain
Close Your Eyes	Cerrar los ojos	Víctor Erice	2023	Spain, France

==== Martin McDonagh: Theatre of Dark Tales ====
British-Irish filmmaker Martin McDonagh was announced to lead a masterclass and career retrospective in the Masterclass section on 29 February 2024, featuring all five of his feature films:

English title	Original title	Director(s)	Year of release	Production countrie(s)
Six Shooter	—N/a	Martin McDonagh	2004	United Kingdom, Ireland
In Bruges	—N/a	Martin McDonagh	2008	United Kingdom, United States
Seven Psychopaths	—N/a	Martin McDonagh	2012	United Kingdom, United States
Three Billboards Outside Ebbing, Missouri	—N/a	Martin McDonagh	2017	United Kingdom, United States
The Banshees of Inisherin	—N/a	Martin McDonagh	2022	United Kingdom, United States

==== Les Auteurs ====
The following films have been selected for screening in the Les Auteurs section:

English title	Original title	Director(s)	Production countrie(s)
The Cats of Gokugu Shrine	五香宮の猫	Kazuhiro Soda	Japan
The Clinic	Sei Khen	Midi Z	Myanmar
Do Not Expect Too Much from the End of the World	Nu aștepta prea mult de la sfârșitul lumii	Radu Jude	Romania, Luxembourg, Croatia, France
Eureka	—N/a	Lisandro Alonso	France, Germany, Portugal, Mexico, Argentina
Mademoiselle Kenopsia	—N/a	Denis Côté	Canada
Memory	—N/a	Michel Franco	United States
Priscilla	—N/a	Sofia Coppola	United States
Ricardo and Painting	—N/a	Barbet Schroeder	France
Shadow of Fire	ほかげ	Shinya Tsukamoto	Japan
A Silence	Un Silence	Joachim Lafosse	Belgium, France, Luxembourg
Snow Leopard	雪豹	Pema Tseden	China
The World is Family	Vasudhaiva Kutumbakam	Anand Patwardhan	India

=== Global Vision ===
The following films have been selected for screening in the Global Vision section:

English title	Original title	Director(s)	Production countrie(s)
Asia
Following the Sound	彼方のうた	Sugita Kyoshi	Japan
If Only I Could Hibernate	Баавгай болохсон	Zoljargal Purevdash	Mongolia
Inshallah a Boy	إن شاء الله ولد	Amjad Al Rasheed	Jordan, France, Saudi Arabia, Qatar, Egypt
Inside the Yellow Cocoon Shell	Bên trong vỏ kén vàng	Phạm Thiên Ân	Vietnam, Singapore, France, Spain
Oasis of Now	—N/a	Chia Chee Sum	Malaysia, Singapore, France
Sunday	Yakshanba	Shokir Kholikov	Uzbekistan
Terrestrial Verses	آیه های زمینی	Ali Asgari, Alireza Khatami	Iran
America
Bad Actor	Un Actor Malo	Jorge Cuchí	Mexico
The Delinquents	Los delincuentes	Rodrigo Moreno	Argentina, Brazil, Chile, Luxembourg
Malu	—N/a	Pedro Freire	Brazil
The Settlers	Los colonos	Felipe Gálvez Haberle	Chile, Argentina, United Kingdom
Solo	—N/a	Sophie Dupuis	Canada
Europe
All to Play For	Rien à perdre	Delphine Deloget	France, Belgium
Blaga's Lessons	Уроците на Блага	Stephan Komandarev	Bulgaria, Germany
Explanation for Everything	Magyarázat mindenre	Gábor Reisz	Hungary, Slovakia
Les Indésirables	Bâtiment 5	Ladj Ly	France
Oceania and Africa
Banel & Adama	Banel et Adama	Ramata-Toulaye Sy	France, Mali, Senegal
Shayda	—N/a	Noora Niasari	Australia

=== Fantastic Beats ===
The following films have been selected for screening in the Fantastic Beats section:

English title	Original title	Director(s)	Production countrie(s)	Ref.
18×2 Beyond Youthful Days	青春18×2 通往有你的旅程	Michihito Fujii	Taiwan, Japan	
Masked Hearts	愛にイナズマ	Yuya Ishii	Japan	
Gold Boy	ゴールド・ボーイ	Shusuke Kaneko	Japan	
How to Have Sex	—N/a	Molly Manning Walker	United Kingdom, Greece, Belgium	
Between the White Key and the Black Key	白鍵と黒鍵の間に	Masanori Tominaga	Japan	
52-Hertz Whales	52ヘルツのクジラたち	Izuru Narushima	Japan	
RedLife	—N/a	Ekalak Klunson	Thailand	

=== Restored Classics ===
Eight restored film classics from various eras and regions were selected for showcase at the festival:

English title	Original title	Director(s)	Year of release	Production countrie(s)
Kohlhiesel's Daughters	Kohlhiesels Töchter	Ernst Lubitsch	1920	Germany
Fear and Desire	—N/a	Stanley Kubrick	1952	United States
Il Grido	—N/a	Michelangelo Antonioni	1957	Italy
L'Amour fou	—N/a	Jacques Rivette	1969	France
The Dupes	المخدوعون	Tewfik Saleh	1973	Syria
Abraham's Valley	Vale Abraão	Manoel de Oliveira	1993	Portugal, France, Switzerland
Deep Crimson (Director's cut)	Profundo Carmesí	Arturo Ripstein	1996	Mexico, Spain, France
The Pianist	—N/a	Roman Polanski	2002	France, Germany, Poland, United Kingdom

=== Focus ===
Three feature films and a short film directed by French filmmaker Jean Eustache were selected for screening in the Focus section:

English title	Original title	Director(s)	Year of release	Production countrie(s)
The Mother and the Whore	La maman et la putain	Jean Eustache	1973	France
My Little Loves	Mes Petites Amoureuses	Jean Eustache	1974	France
A Dirty Story	Une sale histoire	Jean Eustache	1977	France
The Photos of Alix	Les photos d'Alix	Jean Eustache	1980	France
