= 58th Karlovy Vary International Film Festival =

Film festival

- Official poster of the 58th Karlovy Vary International Film Festival
- Location: Karlovy Vary, Czech Republic
- Founded: 1946
- No. of films: 170
- Festival date: 28 June–6 July 2024
- Website: www.kviff.com/en/homepage

KVIFF chronology
- 59th 57th

The 58th Karlovy Vary International Film Festival took place from 28 June to 6 July 2024, in Karlovy Vary, Czech Republic. The official selections lineup was announced on 28 May, with the remainder of the lineup announced on 14 June.

== Official selection ==
=== Crystal Globe ===
English title	Original title	Director(s)	Production countrie(s)
Banzo		Margarida Cardoso	Portugal, France, Netherlands
Celebration	Proslava	Bruno Anković	Croatia, Qatar
The Hungarian Dressmaker	Ema a smrtihlav	Iveta Grófová	Slovakia, Czech Republic
Loveable	Elskling	Lilja Ingolfsdottir	Norway
Our Lovely Pig Slaughter	Mord	Adam Martinec	Czech Republic, Slovakia
Panopticon	Panoptikoni	George Sikharulidze	Georgia, France, Italy, Romania
Pierce	刺心切骨	Nelicia Low	Singapore, Taiwan, Poland
Rude to Love	Ai ni ranbou	Yukihiro Morigaki	Japan
A Sudden Glimpse to Deeper Things		Mark Cousins	United Kingdom
Three Days of Fish	Drie dagen vis	Peter Hoogendoorn	Netherlands, Belgium
Tiny Lights	Světýlka	Beata Parkanová	Czech Republic, Slovakia
Xoftex		Noaz Deshe	Germany, France

=== PROXIMA ===
English title	Original title	Director(s)	Production countrie(s)
The Alienated	Fără suflet	Anja Kreis	Germany, Moldova, France
Cabo Negro		Abdellah Taïa	France, Morocco
Chlorophyll	Clorofilla	Ivana Gloria	Italy
Lapilli		Paula Ďurinová	Slovakia, Germany
March to May	Od marca do mája	Martin Pavol Repka	Czech Republic
Night Has Come	Vino la noche	Paolo Tizón	Peru, Spain, Mexico
Nothing in Its Place	Hiçbir şey yerinde değil	Burak Çevik	Turkey, Germany, South Korea
Second Chance		Subhadra Mahajan	India
Stranger	Ju wai ren	Zhengfan Yang	United States, China, Netherlands, Norway, France
Trans Memoria		Victoria Verseau	Sweden, France
Tropicana		Omer Tobi	Israel, Canada
Windless	Bezvetrije	Pavel G. Vesnakov	Bulgaria, Italy

=== Special Screenings ===
English title	Original title	Director(s)	Production countrie(s)
Czechoslovak Architecture 58–89	Architektura ČSSR 58–89	Jan Zajíček	Czech Republic, Slovakia
The Gardener's Year	Zahradníkův rok	Jiří Havelka	Czech Republic
I'm Not Everything I Want to Be	Ještě nejsem, kým chci být	Klára Tasovská	Czech Republic, Slovakia
In the Land of Brothers		Alireza Ghasemi, Raha Amirfazli	Ireland, France, Netherlands
Journey to the Brink of War	Voyage au bord de la guerre	Antonin Peretjatko	France
The Other One	Ta druhá	Marie-Magdalena Kochová	Czech Republic
Real		Oleg Sentsov	Ukraine, Croatia
The Song of Others - A Search for Europe	Das Lied der Anderen – Eine Suche nach Europa	Vadim Jendreyko	Switzerland
Tatabojs.doc		Marek Najbrt	Czech Republic
Waves	Vlny	Jiří Mádl	Czech Republic

=== Horizons ===
English title	Original title	Director(s)	Production countrie(s)
All We Imagine as Light		Payal Kapadia	France, India, Netherlands, Luxembourg
Architecton		Viktor Kossakovsky	Germany, France, United States
The Balconettes	Les Femmes au Balcon	Noémie Merlant	France
The Beast	La Bête	Bertrand Bonello	France, Canada
Between the Temples		Nathan Silver	United States
Brief History of a Family	Jia ting jian shi	Lin Jianjie	China, France, Denmark, Qatar
Bye Bye Tiberias	Bye Bye Tibériade	Lina Soualem	France, Belgium, Palestine, Qatar
Crossing		Levan Akin	Sweden, Denmark, France, Turkey, Georgia
A Different Man		Aaron Schimberg	United States
Direct Action		Guillaume Cailleau, Ben Russell	Germany, France
Dying	Sterben	Matthias Glasner	Germany
Explanation for Everything	Magyarázat mindenre	Gábor Reisz	Hungary, Slovakia
Favoriten		Ruth Beckermann	Austria
Gasoline Rainbow		Bill Ross IV, Turner Ross	United States
Girls Will Be Girls		Shuchi Talati	India, France, United States, Norway
The Girl with the Needle	Pigen med nalen	Magnus von Horn	Denmark, Poland, Sweden
Gloria!		Margherita Vicario	Italy, Switzerland
Grand Tour		Miguel Gomes	Portugal, Italy, France
Holy Cow	Vingt dieux	Louise Courvoisier	France
Housekeeping for Beginners	Domakinstvo za pocetnici	Goran Stolevski	North Macedonia, Croatia, Serbia, Poland, Kosovo
The Invasion		Sergei Loznitsa	Netherlands, France, United States
It's Not Me	C'est pas moi	Leos Carax	France
Julie Keeps Quiet	Julie zwijgt	Leonardo Van Dijl	Belgium, Sweden
Kinds of Kindness		Yorgos Lanthimos	Ireland, United Kingdom, United States
Kneecap		Rich Peppiatt	Ireland
Living Large	Život k sežrání	Kristina Dufková	Czechia, Slovakia, France
Memory		Michel Franco	Mexico, United States
My Favourite Cake	Keyke mahboobe man	Maryam Moqadam, Behtash Sanaeeha	Iran, France, Sweden, Germany
My Summer with Irène	Quell'estate con Irène	Carlo Sironi	Italy, France
Nasty		Tudor Giurgiu, Cristian Pascariu, Tudor D. Popescu	Romania
No Other Land		Basel Adra, Hamdan Ballal, Yuval Abraham, Rachel Szor	Palestine, Norway
On Becoming a Guinea Fowl		Rungano Nyoni	Zambia, United Kingdom, Ireland
The Other Way Around	Volveréis	Jonás Trueba	Spain, France
Parthenope		Paolo Sorrentino	Italy, France
Pepe		Nelson Carlos De Los Santos Arias	Dominican Republic, Namibia, Germany, France
Porcelain War		Brendan Bellomo, Slava Leontyev	Ukraine, Australia, United States
The Rescue: The Weight of the World	El rapto	Daniela Goggi	Argentina, United States
Rumours		Guy Maddin, Evan Johnson, Galen Johnson	Canada, Germany
Ryuichi Sakamoto: Opus		Neo Sora	Japan
Santosh		Sandhya Suri	United Kingdom, India, France, Germany
Shambhala		Min Bahadur Bham	Nepal, France, Norway, Hong Kong, China, Turkey, Taiwan, United States, Qatar
Silent Trilogy	Mykkätrilogia	Juho Kuosmanen	Finland
Sleep with Your Eyes Open	Dormir de olhos abertos	Nele Wohlatz	Brazil, Argentina, Taiwan, Germany
The Story of Souleymane	L'Histoire de Souleymane	Boris Lojkine	France
The Substance		Coralie Fargeat	United Kingdom, United States, France
Three Kilometres to the End of the World	Trei kilometri până la capătul lumii	Emanuel Pârvu	Romania
Trust	Confidenza	Daniele Luchetti	Italy
Viet and Nam	Trong lòng đất	Minh Quý Trương	Philippines, Singapore, France, Netherlands, Italy, Germany, Vietnam, United States
The Village Next to Paradise		Mo Harawe	Austria, France, Germany, Somalia
When the Light Breaks	Ljósbrot	Rúnar Rúnarsson	Iceland, Netherlands, Croatia, France
Who Do I Belong To	Mé el Aïn	Meryam Joobeur	Tunisia, France, Canada, Norway, Qatar, Saudi Arabia

=== Imagina ===
English title	Original title	Director(s)	Production countrie(s)
Abiding Nowhere	Wu Suo Zhu	Tsai Ming-liang	Taiwan, United States
Allies	Aliados	Azucena Losana	Mexico
Always Show Courage When Burning to the Ground		Joseph Wilson	United Kingdom
Beautiful Dead Woman	Die schöne Tote	Jan Soldat	Germany, Austria
Best Secret Place		Caroline Poggi, Jonathan Vinel	France
Bliss Point		Gerard Ortín Castellví	Spain, United Kingdom, Italy
The Garden Cadences		Dane Komljen	Germany
The Human Hibernation		Anna Cornudella Castro	Spain
Lolo & Sosaku: The Western Archive		Sergio Caballero	Spain
Mare Imbrium		Siegfried A. Fruhauf	Austria
Of Other Tomorrows Never Known		Natasha Tontey	Indonesia, Germany
Preemptive Listening		Aura Satz	United Kingdom, Finland
Silent Panorama		Nicolas Piret	Belgium
Slow Shift		Shambhavi Kaul	United States, India
Spheres		Daniel Zimmermann	Switzerland, Austria
Teen Girl Fantasy		Marisa Hoicka	Canada,
UNDR		Kamal Aljafari	Germany, Palestine

=== Future Frames: Generation Next of European Cinema ===
English title	Original title	Director(s)	Production countrie(s)
Baldilocks	Kaalkapje	Marthe Peters	Belgium, Netherlands
The Complaint	Sammen er du mere	William Sehested Høeg	Denmark
Cura sana		Lucía G. Romero	Spain
A Good Mind Grows in Thorny Places	Dom Strom	Katarína Gramatová	Slovakia
If I Float	Dacă voi pluti	Bogdan Alecsandru	Romania
The Love Servant	Ancella d'amore	Emanuela Muzzupappa	Italy
Strangers in the Night		Matthias Krepp	Austria
A Study of Empathy	Eine Studie in Empathie	Hilke Rönnfeldt	Germany, Denmark
Who Stands Up for Alvar	Vem ropar för Alvar	Anna Maria Jóakimsdóttir-Hutri	Sweden
3 MWh		Marie-Magdalena Kochová	Czechia

=== Pragueshorts ===
English title	Original title	Director(s)	Production countrie(s)
AliEN0089		Valeria Hofmann	Chile, Argentina
The Baroque	Baroko	David Payne, Tomáš Navrátil	Czechia
Battery Mommy		Seung-bae Jeon	South Korea
Blue Boy		Nikulás Tumi Hlynsson	Czechia
Buzz of the Earth	Bzukot Země	Greta Stocklassa	Czechia
Cross My Heart and Hope to Die		Sam Manacsa	Philippines
Curiosa		Tessa Moult-Milewska	United Kingdom
Dormouse	Siebenschläfer	Julia Ocker	Germany
Eighth Day	Osmý den	Petr Pylypčuk	Czechia
Electra		Daria Kashcheeva	Czechia, France, Slovakia
Kinderfilm		Total Refusal	Austria
Luce and the Rock		Britt Raes	Belgium, France, Netherlands
Oyu		Atsushi Hirai	France, Japan
Pond	Tümpel	Lena von Döhren, Eva Rust	Switzerland
Prince Ki Ki Do: Tea cup	Princ Ki Ki Do: Skodelica čaja	Grega Mastnak	Slovenia
Sea Salt		Leila Basma	Czechia, Lebanon
To Be Sisters	Entre deux sœurs	Anne-Sophie Gousset, Clément Céard	France

=== Out of the Past ===
English title	Original title	Director(s)	Production countrie(s)
Fort Apache		John Ford	United States
François Truffaut, My Life, a Screenplay	François Truffaut, le scénario de ma vie	David Teboul	France
Let's Get Lost		Bruce Weber	United States
Love Streams		John Cassavetes	United States
Murdering the Devil	Vražda ing. Čerta	Ester Krumbachová	Czechoslovakia
The Mysterious Castle in the Carpathians	Tajemství hradu v Karpatech	Oldřich Lipský	Czechoslovakia
Paris, Texas		Wim Wenders	Germany, France, United Kingdom, United States
Shadows of a Hot Summer	Stíny horkého léta	František Vláčil	Czechoslovakia
The Taking		Alexandre O. Philippe	United States
Twentynine Palms		Bruno Dumont	France, United States, Germany
Two English Girls	Les deux Anglaises et le continent	François Truffaut	France

=== Midnight Screenings ===
English title	Original title	Director(s)	Production countrie(s)
Hunting Daze	Jour de chasse	Annick Blanc	Canada
Love Lies Bleeding		Rose Glass	United States
MaXXXine		Ti West	United States
The Roundup: Punishment	범죄도시4	Heo Myung-haeng	South Korea
Steppenwolf		Adilkhan Yerzhanov	Kazakhstan

=== The Wish to Be a Red Indian: Kafka and Cinema ===
English title	Original title	Director(s)	Production countrie(s)
After Hours		Martin Scorsese	United States
America	Amerika	Vladimír Michálek	Czechia
Artist of Fasting	Danjiki geinin	Masao Adachi	Japan, South Korea
The Audience	L'udienza	Marco Ferreri	Italy, France
The Castle	Das Schloss	Rudolf Noelte	Germany
Class Relations	Klassenverhältnisse	Jean-Marie Straub, Danièle Huillet	Germany, France
Franz Kafka's A Country Doctor	Kafka inaka isha	Kōji Yamamura	Japan
Franz Kafka's It's a Wonderful Life		Peter Capaldi	United Kingdom
The Grandmother		David Lynch	United States
Interview	Intervista	Federico Fellini	Italy
Joseph Kilian	Postava k podpírání	Pavel Juráček, Jan Schmidt	Czechoslovakia
K		Lorenza Mazzetti	United Kingdom
Kafka		Zbigniew Rybczyński	United States, France
Kafka		Steven Soderbergh	United States, France
Metamorphosis	Die Verwandlung	Jan Němec	Germany
The Money Order	Mandabi	Ousmane Sembène	France, Senegal
Mr. Kneff		Steven Soderbergh	United States, France
The Tenant	Le Locataire	Roman Polanski	France
Tetsuo: The Iron Man		Shinya Tsukamoto	Japan
The Tomb of Kafka	Le Tombeau de Kafka	Jean-Claude Rousseau	France
The Trial	Le procès	Orson Welles	France, Italy, Germany
Twin Peaks: A Limited Event Series		David Lynch	United States

=== Tribute to Francine Maisler ===
English title	Original title	Director(s)	Production countrie(s)
The Bikeriders		Jeff Nichols	United States

=== Tribute to Ivan Trojan ===
English title	Original title	Director(s)	Production countrie(s)
The Karamazov Brothers	Karamazovi	Petr Zelenka	Czechia, Poland

== Awards ==
The following awards were presented:

=== Official selection awards ===
- Grand Prix – Crystal Globe: A Sudden Glimpse to Deeper Things — Mark Cousins
- Special Jury Prize: Loveable (Elskling) — Lilja Ingolfsdottir
- Special Jury Mention:
  - Xoftex — Noaz Deshe
  - Our Lovely Pig Slaughter (Mord) — Adam Martinec
- Best Director: Nelicia Low, Pierce
- Best Actress: Helga Guren, Loveable (Elskling)
- Best Actor: Ton Kas & Guido Pollemans, Three Days of Fish (Drie dagen vis)

=== Other statutory awards ===
- PROXIMA Grand Prix: Stranger (Ju wai ren) — Yang Zhengfan
- PROXIMA Special Jury Prize: Night Has Come (Vino la noche) — Paolo Tizón
- PROXIMA Special Jury Mention: March to May (Od marca do mája) — Martin Pavol Repka
- Právo Audience Award: Waves (Vlny) — Jiří Mádl
- Festival President's Award: Viggo Mortensen, Daniel Brühl, Clive Owen
- Festival President's Award for Contribution to Czech Cinematography: Ivan Trojan

=== Non-statutory awards ===
- The Ecumenical Jury Award: Loveable (Elskling) — Lilja Ingolfsdottir
- Commendation of the Ecumenical Jury: Panopticon (Panoptikoni) — George Sikharulidze
- Europa Cinemas Label Award: Loveable (Elskling) — Lilja Ingolfsdottir
- FIPRESCI Award for Crystal Globe Competition: Loveable (Elskling) — Lilja Ingolfsdottir
- FIPRESCI Award for PROXIMA Competition: Night Has Come (Vino la noche) — Paolo Tizón
