= List of Hungarian films of 2014 =

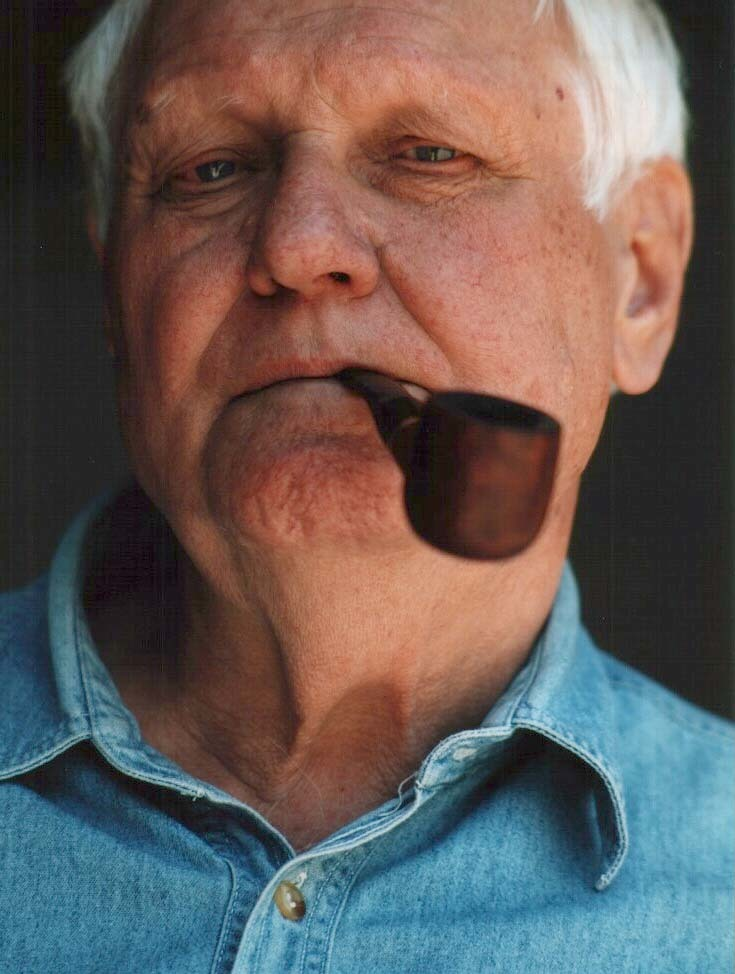
2014 saw the death of Miklós Jancsó.

The Hungarian film industry produced over thirty feature films in 2014. This article fully lists all non-pornographic films, including short films, that had a release date in that year and which were at least partly made by Hungary. It does not include films first released in previous years that had release dates in 2014.
Also included is an overview of the major events in Hungarian film, including film festivals and awards ceremonies, as well as lists of those films that have been particularly well received, both critically and financially.

== Major releases ==
Opening		Title	Cast and Crew	Studio	Genre(s)	Ref.
J A N U A R Y	16	Anita B.	Director: Roberto Faenza; Cast: Eline Powell, Robert Sheehan, Andrea Osvárt		Drama	
J A N U A R Y	17	The Mighty Angel	Director: Wojciech Smarzowski; Cast: Robert Więckiewicz, Julia Kijowska, Adam Woronowicz		Drama	
F E B R U A R Y	8	Land of Storms	Director: Ádám Császi; Cast: András Sütő, Ádám Varga, Sebastian Urzendowsky	TLA Releasing	Drama	
M A Y	23	White God	Director: Kornél Mundruczó; Cast: Zsófia Psotta		Drama	
J U L Y	5	Afterlife	Director: Virág Zomborácz		Comedy	
J U L Y	9	Corn Island	Director: Giorgi Ovashvili; Cast: İlyas Salman		Drama	
S E P T E M B E R	5	Mirage	Director: Szabolcs Hajdu; Cast: Isaach De Bankolé		Drama	
S E P T E M B E R	6	The Duke of Burgundy	Director: Peter Strickland; Cast: Sidse Babett Knudsen, Chiara D'Anna	Artificial Eye	Drama	
O C T O B E R	9	Symphony No. 42	Director: Réka Bucsi		Animated short	
O C T O B E R	30	For Some Inexplicable Reason	Director: Gábor Reisz; Cast: Aron Ferenczik		Drama/Comedy	

== Notable deaths ==
Month	Date	Name	Age	Nationality	Profession	Notable films
January	31	Miklós Jancsó	92	Hungarian	Director, Screenwriter	Hungarian Rhapsody; Private Vices, Public Pleasures
November	7	Zoltán Gera	91	Hungarian	Actor	Escape to Victory; Sunshine

== See also ==
- 2014 in film
- 2014 in Hungary
- Cinema of Hungary
- List of Hungarian submissions for the Academy Award for Best Foreign Language Film
