= Pepe (2024 Dominican film) =

2024 film by Nelson Carlo de Los Santos Arias

- Festival release poster
- Directed by: Nelson Carlo De Los Santos Arias
- Screenplay by: Nelson Carlo De Los Santos Arias
- Produced by: Nelson Carlo De Los Santos Arias; Pablo Lozano; Tanya Valette
- Starring: Jhon Narváez; Sor María Ríos
- Cinematography: Camilo Soratti; Roman Lechapelier; Nelson Carlos De Los Santos Arias
- Edited by: Tom Swash; Nelson Carlos De Los Santos Arias
- Music by: Nelson Carlos De Los Santos Arias
- Animation by: Erwin Jiménez; Manuel Barenboim
- Production companies: 4 A 4 Productions; Pandora Film; Joe Vision Production
- Distributed by: Monte & Culebra
- Release dates: 20 February 2024 (Berlinale); 1 May 2025 (Dominican Republic)
- Running time: 122 minutes
- Countries: Dominican Republic; Namibia; Germany; France
- Languages: Spanish; Afrikaans; Mbukushu; German

Pepe is a 2024 drama film written, co-produced, co-edited and directed by Nelson Carlo De Los Santos Arias. The film starring Jhon Narváez and Sor María Ríos, is voice of Pepe, the first and last hippo killed in the Americas, who appears as ghost and recounts his story with the powerful oral tradition of these communities.

The film is an international co-production between Dominican Republic, Namibia, Germany, and France, and had its world premiere at the 74th Berlin International Film Festival on 20 February, where it competed for the Golden Bear and won Silver Bear for Best Director. It was selected as the Dominican entry for the Best International Feature Film at the 98th Academy Awards, but it was not nominated.

== Synopsis ==
A young hippopotamus known by the name Pepe, which the media gave it, was killed in the jungle of Colombia but returns in the form of a ghost. It is a hippo's voice, or so it says. It has no sense of time, only of the past that haunts it. "Is that noise mine? What is this thing I use to make it?" The animal is certain of one thing: it is no longer alive. It was the first and last of its kind to be slain in the Americas. We are drawn into a world of many tales, each containing more tales within. With seriousness and humor, honesty and trickery, images and sounds convey the powerful dialogue of places where creatures like Pepe perished without ever grasping the true nature of their situation.

== Cast ==
As Pepe

- Jhon Narváez
- Fareed Matjila
- Harmony Ahalwa
- Shifafure Faustinus

Others

- Sor María Ríos as Betania
- Jorge Puntillón García as Candelario
- Steven Alexander as Cocorico
- Nicolás Marín Caly as Ángel
- Wolfgang Fuhrmann as Señor Heribert (Cazador)

== Production ==
Pepe, is a hippopotamus who was shifted from his homeland in Africa to Colombia to reside in the private zoo of drug lord Pablo Escobar. The story is 'narrated' by the animal. Carlo Chatrian artistic director of the Berlinale, categoried the film directed by Dominican Nelson Carlos De Los Santos Arias, as "the film featured a blend of genres and styles, making it the most “unclassifiable” film in the selection."

The film is supported by World Cinema Fund, which was launched in 2004 on the initiative of the Federal Cultural Foundation and the Berlinale, and is one of twelve films invited to Berlinale.

The film was shot in locations in Namibia and Colombia.

== Release ==
Pepe had its world premiere on 20 February 2024, as part of the 74th Berlin International Film Festival, in Competition.

The film was first screened at the 48th Hong Kong International Film Festival on 3 April 2024 in Firebird Awards Young Cinema competition.

The film was featured in Features section of the 71st Sydney Film Festival on June 6, 2024. It was also screened in 'Horizons' at the 58th Karlovy Vary International Film Festival on 28 June 2024.

It was also selected in Wavelengths at 2024 Toronto International Film Festival where it was screened on September 6, 2024. It was also featured in Zabaltegi-Tabakalera section of 72nd San Sebastián International Film Festival, where it was played on 25 September 2024. It was also presented in 'Strands: Dare' section of the 2024 BFI London Film Festival on 17 October 2024, and competed in the International Competition at the 2024 Festival du nouveau cinéma taking place from 9 to 20 October, and also had its Quebec Premiere on October 10, 2024. It also made it to Main Slate of 2024 New York Film Festival and was screened at the Lincoln Center in October 2024. On 28 October 2024, the film was showcased at the 37th Tokyo International Film Festival in 'World Focus' section.

The film was released commercially on May 1, 2025, in Dominican theaters.

== Reception ==
On review aggregator Rotten Tomatoes, the film holds an approval rating of 68% based on 22 reviews, with an average rating of 7.3/10.

Jessica Kiang reviewing in Variety said, "Nelson Carlo De Los Santos Arias sends us on an uncategorizably odd journey down the river of his noodling, needling imagination in a rickety canoe that keeps on capsizing, upended by another sideswiping reference, another jarring change of scene and timeframe or yet another stretch of borderline incomprehensible narration from Pepe himself, a creature who is as surprised as we are that he has suddenly acquired language."

David Rooney reviewing the film for The Hollywood Reporter dubbed it as "Structurally messy but oddly haunting," and opined, " the film achieves full force in a breathtaking final image as the camera zooms out high above the sad spectacle of Pepe felled by bullets in lush green grassland, a half-circle of gawping humans standing over the hippo’s bloodied body." Rooney concluded, "The uneven movie is worth seeing for that shot alone."

Marc van de Klashorst reviewed the film for the International Cinephile Society and remarked that the film is "most notable for the incredible nature of its story and for its fine camera and sound work, the hybrid film is enjoyable but overlong, and a prime example of a film that screams for post-viewing research."

Wendy Ide wrote in ScreenDaily while reviewing the film at Berlinale, "Pepe is crammed, perhaps even overstuffed, with ideas, but which, like the huge beasts at the heart of the story, is deceptively agile and light on its feet."

Ola Salwa reviewing the film at Berlinale for Cineuropa wrote, "While the peculiar sound the eponymous hippo makes in Nelson Carlo De Los Santos Arias’s film lingers in the mind after the screening, everything else is washed away quickly."

Nicholas Bell in Ion Cinema rated the film with four stars and said, "Nelson Carlo De Los Santos Arias concocts a continually unpredictable visual and narrative journey which continually shifts and splinters perspectives." Concluding Bell opined, "If there’s any way to rightly convey the essence of what de Los Santo Arias has conjured, Pepe plays like a version of Dumbo as directed by Miguel Gomes."

Writing for RogerEbert.com, Robert Daniels opined, "Pepe’s voice is initially difficult to take seriously: It’s a deep timbre, composed of hooting and grunting. But once the film settles in, guided by Pepe’s poetic recollections of how much he misses an Africa he never knew, the restrictions he must endure while in captivity, the pain of being exiled, and the fear of hearing the whirring of a chopper, the incredulity felt by the viewer is replaced by real sorrow."

== Accolades ==
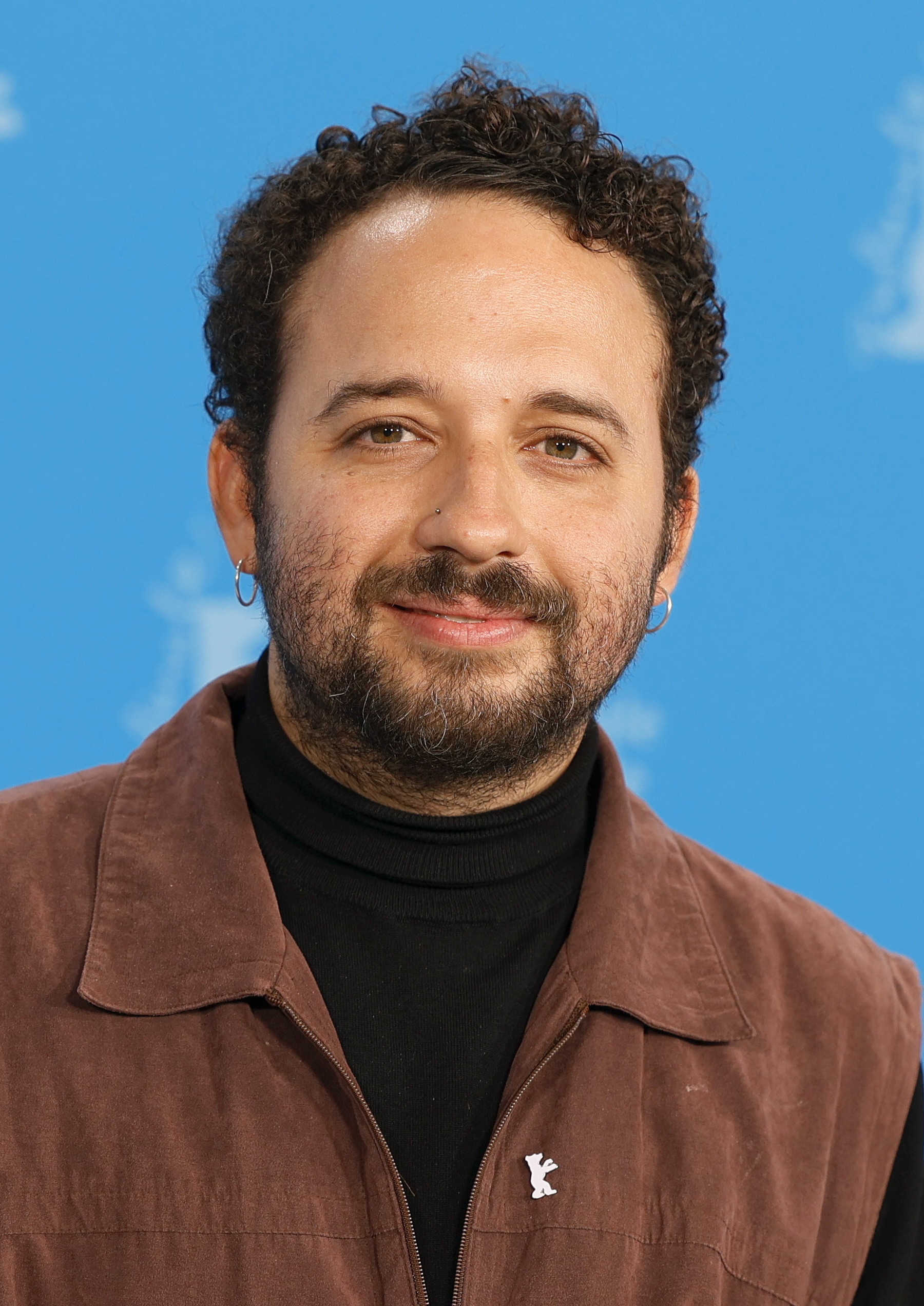
Nelson Carlo De Los Santos Arias at Berlinale 2024

The film was selected in Competition at the 74th Berlin International Film Festival, thusly it was nominated to compete for Golden Bear.

Award	Date	Category	Recipient	Result	Ref.
Berlin International Film Festival	25 February 2024	Golden Bear	Nelson Carlo De Los Santos Arias	Nominated	
Berlin International Film Festival	25 February 2024	Silver Bear for Best Director	Nelson Carlo De Los Santos Arias	Won	
Lima Film Festival	17 August 2024	Best Picture	Pepe	Nominated	
San Sebastián International Film Festival	28 September 2024	Zabaltegi-Tabakalera Award	Pepe	Nominated	
Sitges Film Festival	13 October 2024	Best Feature Film – Noves Visions	Pepe	Pending	

== See also ==
- List of individual hippopotamids
- List of submissions to the 98th Academy Awards for Best International Feature Film
- List of Dominican submissions for the Academy Award for Best International Feature Film
