= The Waldheim Waltz =

2018 film

- Film poster
- Directed by: Ruth Beckermann
- Written by: Ruth Beckermann
- Edited by: Dieter Pichler
- Release dates: 17 February 2018 (Berlin); 5 October 2018 (Austria)
- Running time: 93 minutes
- Country: Austria
- Language: German

The Waldheim Waltz (German: Waldheims Walzer) is a 2018 Austrian documentary film directed by Ruth Beckermann. It was selected as the Austrian entry for the Best Foreign Language Film at the 91st Academy Awards, but it was not nominated.

== Synopsis ==
Director Ruth Beckermann investigates the erasure of Austria's Nazi-era past by profiling U.N. Secretary General and Austrian President Kurt Waldheim, who once served in the German Wehrmacht.

== Awards and accolades ==
The film won the main prize at the 2018 Play-Doc in Tui, Galicia.

== See also ==
- Fred Sinowatz
- Hubertus Czernin
- Kozara Offensive
- List of submissions to the 91st Academy Awards for Best Foreign Language Film
- List of Austrian submissions for the Academy Award for Best Foreign Language Film
- The Waldheim affair at the World Jewish Congress
