= Love Lies (2024 film) =

2024 Hong Kong film by Ho Miu-ki

- Theatrical release poster
- Traditional Chinese: 我談的那場戀愛
- Jyutping: Ngo^{5} Taam^{4} Dik^{1} Naa^{5} Coeng^{4} Lyun^{2} Oi^{3}
- Directed by: Ho Miu Ki
- Screenplay by: Ho Miu Ki; Chan Hing Kai
- Produced by: Chan Hing Kai; Janet Chun
- Starring: Sandra Ng; MC Cheung Tin-fu
- Cinematography: Tam Wai Kai
- Edited by: To To
- Music by: Day Tai
- Production company: One Cool Film Production
- Distributed by: One Cool Pictures
- Release dates: 29 March 2024 (HKIFF); 12 September 2024 (Hong Kong)
- Running time: 116 minutes
- Country: Hong Kong
- Language: Cantonese

Love Lies (Chinese: 我談的那場戀愛) is a 2024 Hong Kong romance film directed and co-written by Ho Miu Ki, marking her directorial debut as part of the First Feature Film Initiative. Starring Sandra Ng and MC Cheung Tin-fu, the film revolves around a melancholic romance that develops from an online scam, featuring a lonely doctor (Ng) who falls prey to a scammer (Cheung).

After co-writing Meow (2017), Ho Miu Ki began developing the screenplay during the COVID-19 pandemic and was selected for the First Feature Film Initiative in 2020. Principal photography took place from June to August 2023, with filming locations in Hong Kong and Hokkaido, Japan. The film features the theme song "Penpal" performed by MC Cheung Tin-fu.

The film had its world premiere at the 48th Hong Kong International Film Festival on 29 March 2024, followed by a theatrical release in Hong Kong on 12 September. It received two nominations in the 61st Golden Horse Awards and five nominations in the 43rd Hong Kong Film Awards.

== Plot ==
An internet scam syndicate is dismantled by the police following an anonymous tip. Renowned gynaecologist Dr. Veronica Yu, believed to be a victim, and a young man named Joe Lee, seen near the syndicate's lair, are questioned by detectives Sit and Wong, leading them to share their stories.

Some time ago, Lee reluctantly interviewed for a job, admitting his habit of lying, yet he was surprisingly hired. His employer, Mr. White, introduces him to the internet fraud syndicate that scams people through dating apps by initiating online relationships. Joan, a screenwriter-turned-strategist, provides Lee with a fake persona: a French engineer named Alain Jeunet. Soon, he matches with Veronica Yu, a lonely middle-aged woman. Curious, she joins the dating app under the guise of a nurse from her clinic. As they start chatting, Mr. White and Joan grow suspicious of Yu, noticing her luxurious lifestyle and lack of social media presence. Following Joan's advice, Lee sets a trap to get Yu to confess her true identity.

The scammers investigate Yu’s identity and discover she is a millionaire, making her a prime target. Lee digs through Yu's old Facebook posts, pretending to be her ideal type and showering her with attention. He fabricates a story about a deceased project partner, manipulating Yu into lending him US$500,000. After a few days underground, Yu grows worried and researches online scams. During a celebration for the syndicate, Lee feels guilty and suggests returning the money. However, Mr. White misinterprets this as Lee’s intention to bait Yu for further scams. Eventually, Lee transfers the money back, and Yu is thrilled, believing she has found true love. Yu wants to meet Lee in person and suggests a trip to Sapporo. Although he could manipulate her through texts, he decides to follow her to Sapporo in person. He lies about his schedule, claiming delays, and Yu forgives him, making him promise to visit Sapporo together the following July. The next day, Yu embarks on her journey alone, with Lee secretly tailing her. She revisits places from her honeymoon with her late husband, breaking down in tears at an izakaya. Lee, sitting nearby, offers tissues and listens as she reminisces.

Upon returning, Yu sees a photo of Lee arriving at Hong Kong International Airport on Facebook, mistakenly reposted by a new recruit from the real Jeunet's account. Rushing to the boarding gate, she finds the real Jeunet, who does not recognize her and has a girlfriend. Seeing a heartbroken Yu, Lee feels sympathetic toward her. Back at the lair, Mr. White believes their relationship is faltering and insists on one last scam. His men create a fake video of Jeunet being abducted, demanding a $5 million ransom. Lee, however, no longer wants to deceive Yu and steals Mr. White's phone. He attempts to confess to Yu, but his battery dies. Meanwhile, Yu sees the video and, concerned, rushes to the bank to transfer the money. Lee borrows a power bank on the street and calls Yu, but his account is remotely logged off by the scammers after he greets her in Cantonese. Yu finally realizes that the man she thought she loved is a fake and smiles wryly. Observing her realization without disappointment, Lee walks away.

During police interrogation, Wong asks if Lee made the anonymous report, and he does not deny it. Yu refuses to testify, claiming to have only experienced a love story. The following July, while visiting Sapporo, she notices a man following her throughout her journey, and exchange smiles when they meet at a streetcar station.

== Cast ==
- Sandra Ng as Dr. Veronica Yu, a successful middle-aged gynecologist whose private life is filled with failures
- MC Cheung Tin-fu as Joe Lee, a new recruit in a dating scam syndicate who poses as a French engineer
- Stephy Tang as Joan, a flirty screenwriter-turned-strategist and second-in-command of the dating scam syndicate
- Chan Fai-hung as Mr. White, the ringleader and mastermind of the dating scam syndicate
- Emotion Cheung as Henry Hui, the deceased husband of Yu

Also featuring cameo appearances by Ronald Cheng as Arthur Fung, Yu's ex-boyfriend; Jo Kuk as Diana, Yu's best friend; Joman Chiang and Lam Yiu-sing as Inspector Carrie Sit and Detective Wong, police officers tasked with cracking down on the scam syndicate; and Elva Ni as Mrs. Chow, a wealthy patient of Yu.

== Production ==
=== Development ===
After the production of the comedy film Meow (2017), screenwriter Ho Miu Ki did not receive any new film contracts due to the rising trend of police action films and the COVID-19 pandemic. During this time, she saw news reports about police cracking an internet scam syndicate, which included scripts for acting out their fraud found in their lair, sparking her interest in the scamming activities. She developed a screenplay draft and joined the First Feature Film Initiative, where she was selected in the sixth wave in 2020, receiving funding of HKD$8 million from the initiative and marking her directorial debut. After being enlisted, Ho approached her mentor Chan Hing Ka to join the project as producer, and the two revised the screenplay to focus more on the romance and emotional aspects rather than the crime elements and warnings about scams. Ho also insisted on filming the latter part of the movie overseas, believing that people would be more emotional when far from home, and chose Hokkaido as the backdrop for its leisurely and relaxed atmosphere.

Due to a limited budget, Chan reached out to various costume and art designers he knew to join the production team for reduced pay or even for free. He also invited Sandra Ng to join the cast, and she accepted the offer immediately after reading the script. Ng declined a fixed paycheck, opting to work for free instead, agreeing to receive a bonus only if the box office was successful. She also lent her own wardrobe to the costume crew and wore her own clothes during filming to help save money. Emotion Cheung and Chan Fai-hung, who were acquainted with Chan Hing Ka, both agreed to make cameo appearances shortly after receiving the invitation as well. The commencement of production was announced in June 2023, with singer MC Cheung Tin-fu and Stephy Tang joining the cast. Cheung was recommended by Ng, who was impressed by his stage charisma after attending his concert, while Tang's role was described as a cameo, as she only participated in the shoot for four days. Photos and text messages between the characters were added on-screen during post-production using VFX effects. The film was completed in March 2024, and was presented by One Cool Film Production at the project market during the Hong Kong International Film Festival that same month. A behind-the-scenes compilation was released on 19 August, revealing cameo appearances by Emotion Cheung, Joman Chiang and Ronald Cheng.

=== Filming ===
Principal photography began on 6 June 2023. Location shooting occurred on 16 June at an industrial building in Fo Tan, Shatin District, where Sandra Ng, MC Cheung Tin-fu, Stephy Tang, and contestants from a talent show hosted by the YouTube channel Running Team were spotted on set. Filming also took place at Central Piers on 21 June. The crew then moved to Japan, shooting in Furano, Hokkaido on 4 July. On 6 July, Cheung opened a Threads account and mentioned that he was filming in Sapporo in his first post, shortly after the social media platform was launched. Due to budget constraints, the crew chose to film in Sapporo because the city government was offering funding initiatives for foreign films. Additionally, the Sapporo government loaned a Sapporo Streetcar for the crew to use on-site and allowed local citizens to register online as volunteer background actors to aid the production and promote Sapporo. Filming in Sapporo took place at Odori Park, Sapporo TV Tower, and Tanukikoji Shopping Street. The shoot wrapped up in early August.

=== Music ===
Love Lies's theme song "Penpal" was performed by MC Cheung Tin-fu and composed by Day Tai, with lyrics co-written by Pakkin Leung and director Ho Miu Ki. A music video was released on 11 September 2024, a day before the film's theatrical release. Louis Koo's "Boyfriend" was featured in the official trailer, which Ho selected because she found the lyrics to be very similar to the film's plot.

== Release ==
Love Lies had its world premiere on 29 March 2024 at the 48th Hong Kong International Film Festival, followed by screenings at the 14th Beijing International Film Festival and the 26th Taipei Film Festival. It was later showcased at the 23rd New York Asian Film Festival, marking its North American premiere. The film premiered at New Town Plaza on 2 September 2024, followed by a theatrical release on 12 September in Hong Kong. It was then featured in the Panorama section of the 43rd Vancouver International Film Festival and the Spotlight on Hong Kong section of the 44th Hawaii International Film Festival, where Sandra Ng received a Filmmaker in Profile Award in the latter.

== Reception ==
=== Box office ===
Love Lies grossed over HK$3 million in its opening weekend, topping the daily box office for four consecutive days, and reached HKD$10 million by the third weekend. The film accumulated HK$15 million by its fourth week, and climbed to HK$17 million by late October.

=== Critical response ===
Edmund Lee of South China Morning Post gave Love Lies 3/5 stars, describing it as an admirable yet mannered film that, while presenting a thought-provoking premise about romance, deception, and loneliness, ultimately fails to fully explore its deeper emotional themes due to an overreliance on light comedy. Lee also ranked the film 17th out of the 36 Hong Kong films theatrically released in 2024. Keith Ho, writing for HK01, lauded the film as an engaging exploration of love and loneliness, particularly its interesting story, lovable characters, and impressive performances especially by Sandra Ng, while noting the film's unique storytelling method and effective use of Sapporo as a backdrop, though he felt the two detective characters could have been better utilized to provoke deeper reflections on the meaning of love and marriage. Siu Yu of am730 noted that the film is an engaging exploration of online scams that infuses romance into its narrative, skillfully capturing the loneliness of modern urban life while showcasing impressive performances, particularly from Sandra Ng and MC Cheung Tin-fu, making it a refreshing and relevant film for Hong Kong audiences.

Alan Chu of United Daily News praised the film as a "clever romantic comedy" that explores the theme of online dating deception, especially Sandra Ng's standout performance that balances humor and emotional depth, despite some uneven pacing in the film. Hai Nan, writing for The News Lens, focused on the writing and found the story to be "logically coherent" and "emotionally authentic", offering a compelling and resonant exploration of the complexities of love and self-deception.

== Awards and nominations ==
Year	Award	Category	Nominee	Result	Ref.
2024	61st Golden Horse Awards	Best Leading Actress	Sandra Ng	Nominated	
2024	61st Golden Horse Awards	Best New Director	Ho Miu Ki	Nominated	
2025	31st Hong Kong Film Critics Society Awards	Film of Merit	—N/a	Won	
2025	43rd Hong Kong Film Awards	Best Screenplay	Ho Miu Ki, Chan Hing Kai	Nominated	
2025	43rd Hong Kong Film Awards	Supporting Actress	Stephy Tang	Nominated	
2025	43rd Hong Kong Film Awards	Best Costume Make Up Design	Dora Ng, ShaSha Law	Nominated	
2025	43rd Hong Kong Film Awards	Best Original Film Song	"Pen Pal"	Nominated	
2025	43rd Hong Kong Film Awards	Best New Director	Ho Miu Ki	Nominated	
