= Favoriten (film) =

2024 Austrian documentary film

- Theatrical release poster
- Directed by: Ruth Beckermann
- Written by: Elisabeth Menasse-Wiesbauer; Ruth Beckerman
- Produced by: Ruth Beckerman
- Starring: Ilkay Idiskut
- Cinematography: John Hammel
- Edited by: Dieter Pichler
- Production company: Ruth Beckermann film production [at]
- Distributed by: Autlook Filmsales
- Release date: 16 February 2024 (Berlinale)
- Running time: 118 minutes
- Country: Austria
- Language: German

Favoriten is a 2024 Austrian documentary film, named after Vienna's tenth district in which the action is set, directed by Ruth Beckermann. It is a film about teaching and learning in what some consider the equivalent of an inner-city school in Austria's largest city in response to recent migrations. It is a hopeful movie, with often surprising experiences oscillating between the roles of learner and teacher. The central theme revolves around a class of 25 elementary students whose engaged teacher is doing what is in her might to create chances for her students that they otherwise, for a lack of education in the parental home and a lack of school-institutional support alike, would not have.

Favoriten had its world premiere on 16 February 2024 in the Encounters at the 74th Berlin International Film Festival. It was also nominated for the Berlinale Documentary Film Award.

== Content ==
The documentary by Ruth Beckermann portrays the daily experiences of students at a challenging school in Vienna-Favoriten. The film tracks the kids as they go through their third grade at elementary school, which is an important stage in their learning paths. The students deal with problems in school and personal life and encounter big obstacles. However, they also demonstrate how much power and talent they possess when they get help and motivation.

== Production ==
The film directed by Ruth Beckermann on the concept from her and Elisabeth Menasse-Wiesbauer, has Johannes Hammel as director of photography and Dieter Pichler as the editor.

The film was funded by the Austrian Film Institute, which provided €120,000 as part of production funding and €62,363 as part of reference funding (as of January 2021). The ORF contributed €70,000 as part of the film/television agreement. €120,000 in production funding came from the Vienna Film Fund and €113,000 from FISA Filmstätte Austria.

Principal photography began on 1 July 2021 in Vienna, Austria, and ended in February 2023.

== Release ==
Favoriten had its world premiere on 16 February 2024, as part of the 74th Berlin International Film Festival, in Encounters.

The film had its first screening at CPH:DOX on 13 March 2024 in Artists & Auteurs section.

It was also screened at the 48th Hong Kong International Film Festival on 5 April 2024 in Firebird Awards Documentary competition.

It was screened at Lichter Filmfest Frankfurt International, Frankfurt on 17 April 2024. The film was also screened in 'Horizons' at the 58th Karlovy Vary International Film Festival on 28 June 2024.

On 10 October 2024, the film was shown in a special screening in Cineplexx 3 organized by "Bildung grenzenlos" und AK, with post-screening discussion. Ruth Beckermann was announced to partake.

It had its North American Premiere in the International Panorama at the Festival du nouveau cinéma on October 11, 2024.

== Reception ==
On the review aggregator Rotten Tomatoes website, the film has an approval rating of 100% based on 10 reviews, with an average rating of 10/10.

Susanne Gottlieb reviewing the film at Berlinale for Cineuropa wrote, "Beckermann offers a moving glimpse into a world, into the potential of young minds – the minds of people who, despite having the odds stacked against them, are often willing to fight the uphill battle for self-realisation."

Jessica Kiang writing in Variety gave positive review and said, "Ruth Beckermann filmed a Viennese grade-school class over three years to deliver a vibrant, provocative and ultimately optimistic portrait of good kids responding to good teaching." She opined, "The judicious honing of the material not only allows the film to flow, it makes commentary on the Austrian schooling system’s failures... all the more eloquent for being evoked rather than underlined." Concluding Kiang described the film as "one of her [Ruth Beckermann's] most straightforwardly enjoyable films" and felt "sadness at the passing of childhood’s sweetest phase," but on the other side she had "warm feeling with regard to the future".

Nikki Baughan reviewing at Berlinale for ScreenDaily wrote, "Favoriten effectively navigates ideas of race, community and opportunity through its endearing, and often surprisingly insightful, subjects."

== Accolades ==
Award	Date of ceremony	Category	Recipient	Result	Ref.
Berlin International Film Festival	25 February 2024	Encounters Golden Bear Plaque for Best Film	Ruth Beckermann	Nominated	
Berlin International Film Festival	25 February 2024	Berlinale Documentary Film Award	Ruth Beckermann	Nominated	
Berlin International Film Festival	25 February 2024	Peace Film Prize	Favoriten	Won	
Hong Kong International Film Festival	7 April 2024	Documentary Competition, Firebird Award	Favoriten	Won	
