= 15th Beijing International Film Festival =

Film Festival in China in 2025

The 2025 Beijing International Film Festival (Chinese: 北京国际电影节), abbreviated BJIFF, marks the 15th edition of the event, celebrating 130 years of world cinema and 120 years of Chinese cinema. Held from April 18 to 26, 2025, in Beijing, China, the festival continues to serve as a platform for international film exchange and industry collaboration.

In commemoration of the 75th anniversary of the establishment of diplomatic relations between China and Brazil, this year’s edition invited Switzerland as the guest country.

== Key events and highlights ==
=== Tiantan Awards ===
The Tiantan Awards remain the festival's most prestigious competition section, recognizing outstanding achievements in filmmaking. The Norwegian film Loveable won the most awards. The film tells the story of a 40-year-old woman striving to rebuild her life after her marriage ends.

- Best Feature — Loveable (Norway)
- Best Director — Lilja Ingolfsdottir, Loveable (Norway)
- Best Actor — Pierre Bastin and Benjamin Lambillotte, Vitrival: The Most Beautiful Village in the World (Belgium)
- Best Actress — Helga Guren, Loveable (Norway)
- Best Screenplay — Lilja Ingolfsdottir, Loveable (Norway)
- Best Supporting Actor — Hai Yitian and Geng Le, Better Me, Better You and Trapped (China)
- Best Supporting Actress — Mara Bestelli, The Message (Argentina)
- Best Artistic Contribution — The Message (Argentina)
- Best Cinematography. — The Message (Argentina)
- Lifetime Achievement Award — Tian Hua (China)

=== Tiantan Jury ===
The Tiantan Awards (Chinese: 天坛奖) jury include six Chinese and international filmmakers.

- Jiang Wen, serving as Jury President
- Joan Chen
- David Yates
- Ni Ni
- Vincent Perez
- Tim Yip

=== Industry forums ===
The festival hosts various industry panels, including discussions on Chinese cinema's global reach, film market strategies, and the future of animation. Experts from Europe, North America, and Asia share insights on international distribution models and cross-cultural storytelling.

=== Special screenings ===
A special screening program commemorated the 80th anniversary of the end of World War 2, and featured films such as The Zone of Interest, Shoah, and The Thin Red Line. The Beijing Film Panorama also showcased classic and contemporary films, including festival premieres and restored masterpieces.

=== Workshops and Masterclasses ===
The Workshop & Masterclass series featured cinematic professionals, including French actress Isabelle Huppert, Chinese director Jia Zhangke, and actor-director Jiang Wen. These sessions provide insights into acting, directing, and film production.

=== Beijing Film Market ===
The Beijing Film Market serves as an incubator for emerging talent and new projects. Initiatives such as the Young Stone Project and the Most Anticipated Young Directors' Works Recommendation Gala aim to support up-and-coming filmmakers.

== International presence ==
The 2025 festival attracted global film industry leaders, including Academy of Motion Picture Arts and Sciences president Janet Yang, and British director David Yates, known for his work on the Harry Potter series, who both served as part of the Tiantan Award jury.
