= A Sudden Glimpse to Deeper Things =

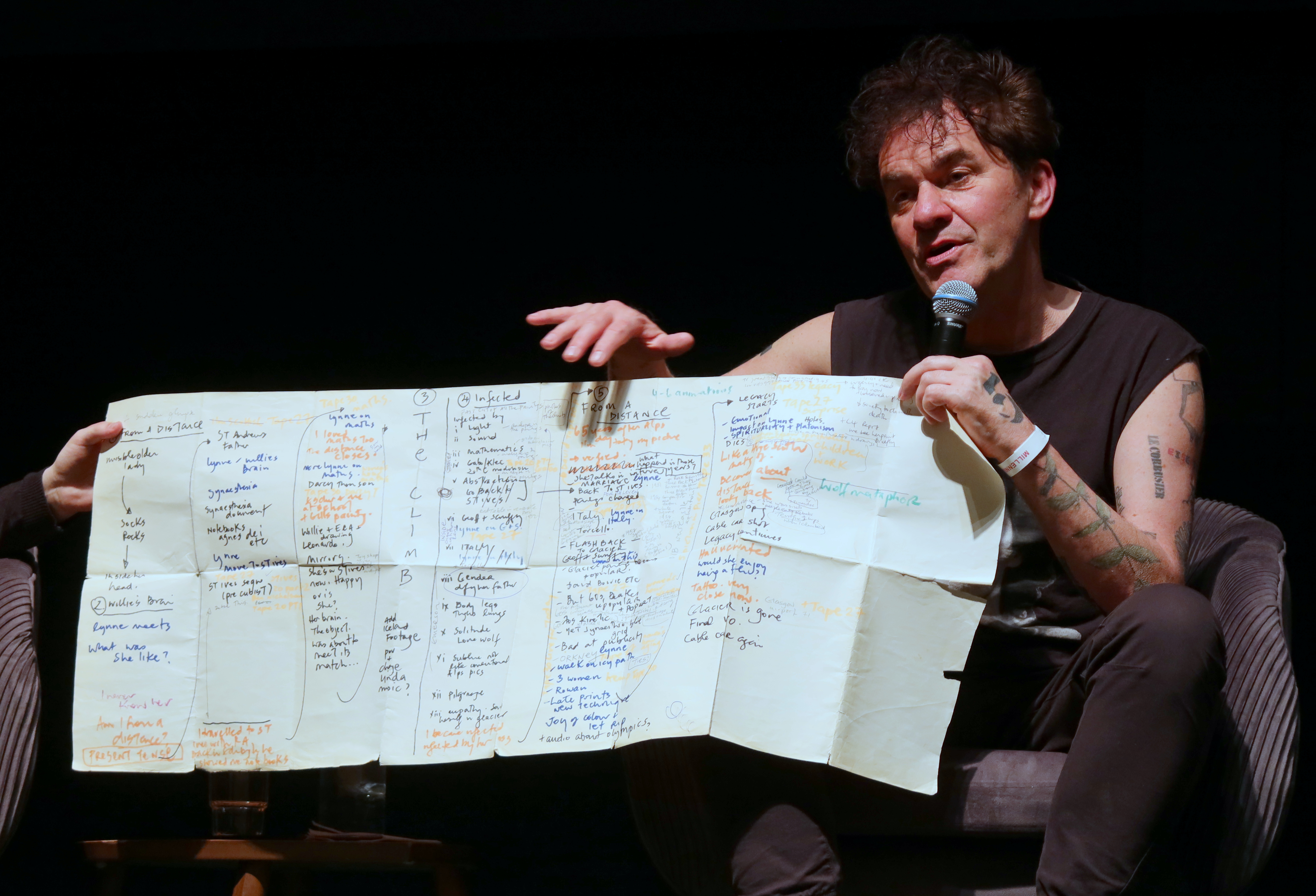
- Mark Cousins presenting a visual outline of the script for his documentary A Sudden Glimpse to Deeper Things – Warsaw, Poland, 9 May 2025
- Directed by: Mark Cousins
- Written by: Mark Cousins
- Produced by: Mary Bell; Adam Dawtrey
- Starring: Wilhelmina Barns-Graham
- Narrated by: Tilda Swinton
- Cinematography: Mark Cousins
- Edited by: Timo Langer
- Music by: Linda Buckley
- Production company: Bofa Productions
- Release date: 3 July 2024 (KVIFF)
- Running time: 88 minutes
- Country: United Kingdom
- Language: English

A Sudden Glimpse to Deeper Things is a 2024 British documentary film, directed by Mark Cousins. The film profiles the life and career of British artist Wilhelmina Barns-Graham, presenting an argument that her artistic legacy has been underrated and should be reevaluated.

The film premiered in July 2024 at the 58th Karlovy Vary International Film Festival, where it was the winner of the Crystal Globe for best film.

== Release ==
In May 2025, the film was screened in Munich at the 40th International Documentary Filmfestival, where its editor, Timo Langer, won the DOK.edit Award.

== Reception ==
In its award statement, the jury noted that "It is particularly impressive how the editor creates space for images that go beyond words and invite to look at them closely. The use of colours and shapes, mathematical formulas and spiritual influences gives the film a unique and profound aesthetic. The passion for painting and the exploration of Leonardo da Vinci are reflected in the editing."
