= Ivo (film) =

2024 German drama film

- Promotional poster
- Directed by: Eva Trobisch
- Written by: Eva Trobisch
- Produced by: Lucas Schmidt; Wolfgang Cimera; Lasse Scharpen; Trini Götze; David Armati Lechner
- Starring: Minna Wündrich
- Cinematography: Adrian Campean
- Edited by: Laura Lauzemis
- Music by: Martin Hossbach
- Production companies: Studio Zentral; Network Movie Film- und Fernsehproduktion; Trimafilm
- Distributed by: Loco Films
- Release date: 20 February 2024 (Berlinale)
- Running time: 104 minutes
- Country: Germany
- Language: German

Ivo is a 2024 German drama film written and directed by Eva Trobisch. Starring Minna Wündrich, the film is about tough end-of-life decisions, told through the story of a palliative home-care titular nurse Ivo. It was selected for screening in the Encounters section at the 74th Berlin International Film Festival, where it had its world premiere on 20 February 2024, where it was nominated for the Golden Bear Plaque for Best Film in the Encounters section, and won the Heiner Carow Prize (for best German young film).

== Synopsis ==
Ivo, a nurse, provides palliative care at home. She sees different people every day: families, couples, and individuals. They live in various places, from small apartments to large houses. They have diverse lives and deaths. They cope differently with the time they have left. Ivo's teenage daughter doesn't need her much anymore, so she spends her days driving in her old Skoda, which she has turned into her personal space. There, she eats, works, sings, curses, and dreams. She has befriended one of her patients, Solveigh, with whose husband, Franz she has started relationship. They work together to look after Solveigh every day, and have sex. Solveigh, who is getting weaker, wants to be in control of her own fate: she asks Ivo to help her end her life.

== Cast ==
- Minna Wündrich as Ivo
- Pia Hierzegger as Solveigh
- Lukas Turtur as Franz
- Lilli Lacher as Cosima)
- Johann Campean as Johann
- Pierre Siegenthaler as Benedikt
- Leopold von Verschuer as Henner
- Wolfgang Rüter as Thorsten Brohnsdorf
- Joanne Gläsel as Renate Brohnsdorf
- Samy Challah as Jorgos
- Benjamin Höppner as Bodo
- Patricia Osmond as Bodo's Mother
- Birte Leest as Gwen

== Production ==
The film was directed and written by Eva Trobisch, It received production funding of €200,000 from the Film- und Medienstiftung NRW.

Filming took place in Cologne from 1 September to 6 October 2022, in the supervision of cinematographer Adrian Campean.

== Release ==
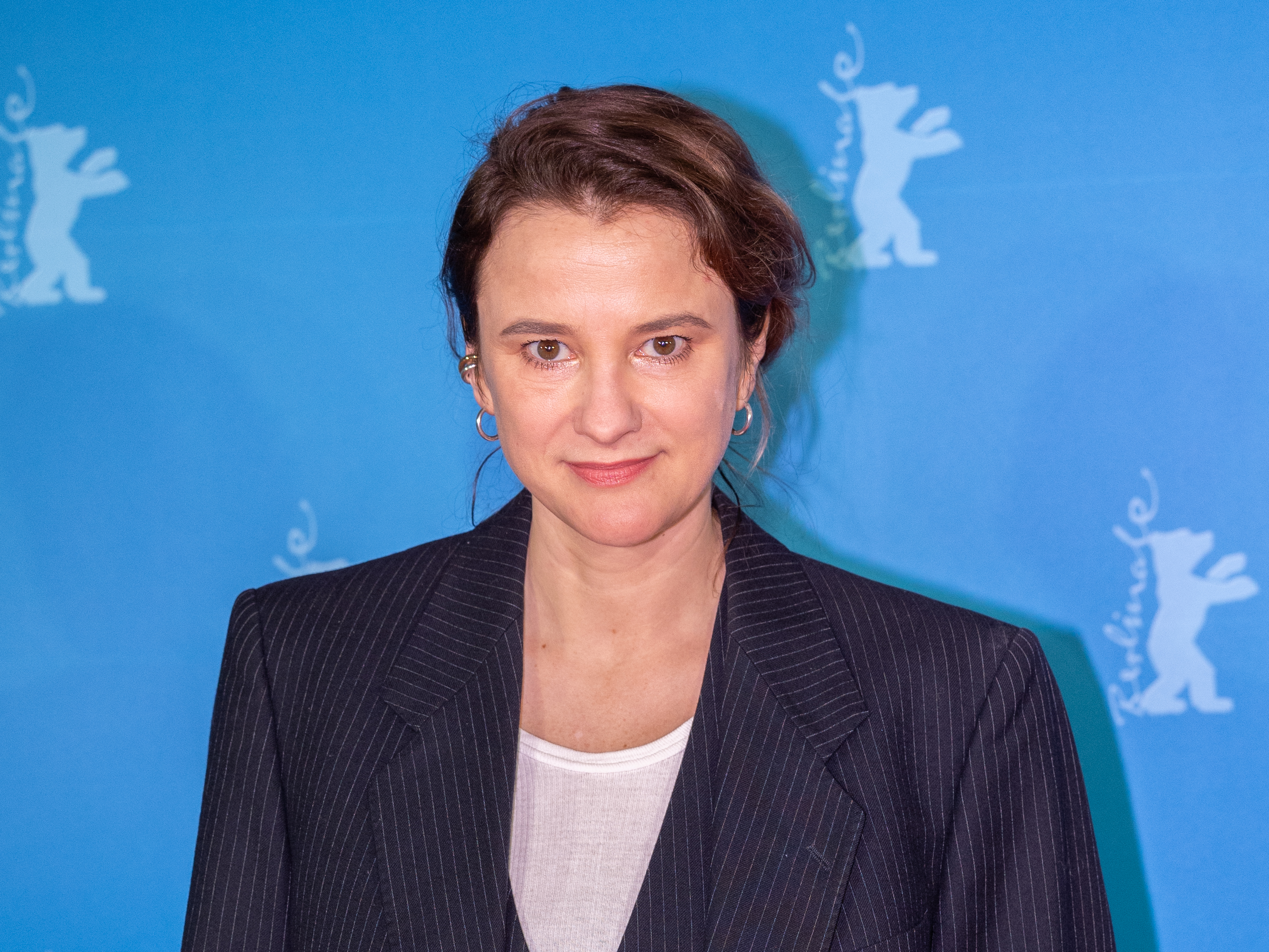
Film director Eva Trobisch at the Berlinale

Ivo had its world premiere on 20 February 2024, as part of the 74th Berlin International Film Festival, in Encounters. In January, Paris-based Loco Films acquired the sales rights of the film prior to its world premiere at Berlinale.

The film was first screened at the 48th Hong Kong International Film Festival on 3 April 2024 in Firebird Awards Young Cinema competition.

The film was also screened at the Bolzano Film Festival, Bozen, on 17 April 2024 for its Italian premiere, and at Lichter Filmfest Frankfurt International, Frankfurt, on 18 April 2024.

The film closed Crossing Europe, an international film festival in Linz, Austria, on 5 May 2024. It also made it to the Meeting Point of the 69th Valladolid International Film Festival, where it screened on 23 October. In October it competed in competition at the Bordeaux International Independent Film Festival, where it won the Grand Prix. On 29 October 2024, it was showcased at the 37th Tokyo International Film Festival in the "Women's Empowerment" section.

== Reception ==
Janick Nolting, reviewing in Kino Zeit at Berlinale, rated the film with three and half stars and wrote, "Trobisch's drama weighs down you with leaden gravity because it confronts its audience with how it must feel when death is part of normal everyday life and work".

Savina Petkova, reviewing the film at Berlinale for Cineuropa, wrote, "The film fully blossoms when it acknowledges contradictions as irreconcilable; always in a calm, accepting manner, as yet another little curiosity life throws your way."

== Accolades ==
| Award | Date of ceremony | Category | Recipient | Result | Ref. |
|---|---|---|---|---|---|
| Berlin International Film Festival | 25 February 2024 | Golden Bear Plaque for Best Film in Encounters | Eva Trobisch | Nominated | |
| Berlin International Film Festival | 25 February 2024 | Heiner Carow Prize (Best German young film) | Eva Trobisch | Won | |
| Bolzano Film Festival | 22 April 2024 | Best Film | Eva Trobisch | Won | |
| Bordeaux International Independent Film Festival | 13 October 2024 | Grand Prix | Ivo | Won | |
