= Bordeaux International Independent Film Festival =

Film festival held in Bordeaux, France

The Bordeaux International Independent Film Festival (French: Festival international du film indépendant de Bordeaux, FIFIB) is an annual film festival held in Bordeaux (France) typically in October. Established in 2012, the festival showcases independent cinema through three major competitions: International Feature Competition, Francophone Short Films Competition, and Contrebandes (for films without French distribution). The festival also presents documentaries, retrospectives, and special events.

== History ==
The Festival international du film indépendant de Bordeaux (Fifib or FIFIB), or Bordeaux International Independent Film Festival, was established in 2012. In that year, Le Capital, directed by Costa-Gavras, was the closing film at the festival.

The 8th edition took place from 15 to 21 October 2019. The 12th edition was held from Wednesday 18 October to Sunday 23 October 2023.

The 13th edition of the festival took place from 8 to 13 October 2024; the grand jury members included filmmakers Thomas Cailley, Lola Quivoron, and Corneliu Porumboiu, as well as actress and pop singer Camélia Jordana; Emmanuelle Béart was a special guest at the event.

The 14th edition was held from 7 to 12 October 2025.

== Description ==
There are three major competition categories as of 2024:

- International Feature Competition
- Francophone Short Films Competition
- Contrebandes

The Contrabande section is for films which do not have a French distributor. Other prizes are also awarded, including for music, television.

The festival also features documentaries, retrospectives, and other events.

== Past award-winners ==
In 2024, Ivo, by Eva Trobisch, won the Grand Prix for feature film, while The Roller, the Life, the Fight, by Elettra Bisogno and Hazem Alqaddi won the Contrebande Grand Prix. Les Miennes, by Samira El Mouzghibati, won an honourable mention for the Grand Prix, and also won the Prix Syndicat français de la Critique (French Syndicate of Cinema Critics' Prize).
