= Arcadia (2024 film) =

2024 Greek fantasy drama film

- Teaser poster
- Directed by: Yorgos Zois
- Screenplay by: Konstantina Kotzamani; Yorgos Zois
- Produced by: Antigoni Rota; Maria Drandaki; Stelios Cotionis; Veselka Kiryakova
- Starring: Vangelis Mourikis; Angeliki Papoulia
- Cinematography: Konstantinos Koukoulios
- Edited by: Yannis Chalkiadakis
- Music by: Petar Dundakov
- Production companies: Foss Productions; Homemade Films; Red Carpet; Two & Two Pictures
- Distributed by: Beta Cinema
- Release date: 18 February 2024 (Berlinale)
- Running time: 99 minutes
- Countries: Greece; Bulgaria; United States
- Language: Greek

Arcadia is a 2024 fantasy drama film directed by Yorgos Zois. Starring Angeliki Papoulia and Vangelis Mourikis, it tells the story of neurologist Katerina and Yannis, a former doctor, as they head off to a deserted seaside resort. Yannis has been called to identify the victim of a tragic accident at the hospital of the small town.

The film, a co-production between Greece, Bulgaria and United States production companies, was selected in the Encounters at the 74th Berlin International Film Festival, where it had its world premiere on 18 February 2024. It was selected as the Greek entry for the Best International Feature Film at the 98th Academy Awards, but it was not nominated.

== Synopsis ==
Katerina, a neurologist, and Yannis, an ex-doctor with a good reputation, are on their way to an isolated coastal resort. The car is quiet as they drive through the sandy hills in a windy autumn day, reflecting the gloomy reason for their trip: Yannis had to go and recognize the body of a fatal accident victim at the small town's hospital. The local police officer tells them that the victim's car had fallen off the edge of a stone bridge and takes them to the mortuary, where Katerina's fears are proven right. Along with Yannis, and also on her own nocturnal visits to a mysterious, old-fashioned beach bar named Arcadia, they start to unravel the mystery, uncovering a haunting tale of love, loss, acceptance, and letting go.

== Cast ==
- Vangelis Mourikis as Yannis
- Angeliki Papoulia as Katerina
- Elena Topalidou as Vicky
- Nikolas Papagiannis as Petros
- Vangelis Evangelinos as Policeman
- Asterios Rimagmos as Nikos
- Evangelia Andreadaki as Despina
- Flomaria Papadaki as Danai
- Elena Mavridou as Klea
- Antonis Tsiotsiopoulos as Ectoras

== Production ==
The film, directed by Yorgos Zois and co-written with Konstantina Kotzamani, is funded by Bulgarian National Film Center, EKOME - National Centre of Audiovisual Media and Communication, Greek Film Centre, and Eurimages.

The film is produced by Foss Productions and Homemade Films.

== Release ==
Arcadia had its world premiere on 18 February 2024, as part of the 74th Berlin International Film Festival, in Encounters.

In January, Beta Cinema acquired the sales rights of the film prior to its world premiere at Berlinale.

The film was first screened at the 48th Hong Kong International Film Festival on 5 April 2024 in Firebird Awards Young Cinema competition.

== Reception ==
Georgi Petkov, writing in Loud and Clear Reviews, rated the film with three and half stars and said, "Intricate human connection hides in the little things. The fantasy drama manages to pull something substantial and valuable out of a fantasy trope that is gently transformed here into a paint brush, coloring a clean, restrained picture of grief." Nicholas Bell in Ion Cinema rated the film with three and half stars and said, "Even as Arcadia takes some sharp turns into the bizarre, it’s a rather cathartic take on a familiar scenario about acceptance."

Mariana Hristova, reviewing the film at Berlinale for Cineuropa, wrote, "Yorgos Zois's second feature sets out as a mysterious erotic thriller with psychological elements, but gradually melts into a predictable relationship (melo)drama."

== Accolades ==
The film was selected for nomination to 37th European Film Awards to be held at Kultur- und Kongresszentrum Luzern in Lucerne on 7 December 2024.

Award	Date of ceremony	Category	Recipient	Result	Ref.
Berlin International Film Festival	25 February 2024	Encounters Golden Bear Plaque for Best Film	Yorgos Zois	Nominated	
Hellenic Film Academy Awards	11 June 2025	Best Film	Arcadia	Won	

== See also ==
- List of submissions to the 98th Academy Awards for Best International Feature Film
- List of Greek submissions for the Academy Award for Best International Feature Film
