= Loveable (film) =

2024 film by Lilja Ingolfsdottir

- Promotional poster
- Norwegian: Elskling
- Directed by: Lilja Ingolfsdottir
- Written by: Lilja Ingolfsdottir
- Produced by: Thomas Robsahm
- Starring: Helga Guren; Oddgeir Thune; Heidi Gjermundsen Broch; Marte Magnusdottir Solem
- Cinematography: Øystein Mamen
- Edited by: Lilja Ingolfsdottir
- Production companies: Nordisk Film; Amarcord
- Release dates: 2 July 2024 (KVIFF); 11 October 2024 (Norway)
- Running time: 101 minutes
- Country: Norway
- Language: Norwegian

Loveable (Norwegian: Elskling) is a 2024 drama film directed, written and edited by Lilja Ingolfsdottir in her feature directorial debut. It stars Helga Guren as a housewife navigating life after her husband, played by Oddgeir Thune, decides to end their marriage.

The film had its world premiere at the 58th Karlovy Vary International Film Festival on 2 July 2024, where it received the Special Jury Prize and four other awards. At the 2025 Amanda Awards, the film led with nine nominations.

== Cast ==
- Helga Guren as Maria
- Oddgeir Thune as Sigmund
- Heidi Gjermundsen Broch as Therapist
- Maja Tothammer-Hruza as Alma
- Marte Magnusdottir Solem as Maria's friend
- Elisabeth Sand as Maria's mother

== Production ==
Between 2022 and 2025, the film received approximately NOK 7.5 million in funding from the Norwegian Film Institute. In September 2023, it won the Best Nordic Project and received a €3,000 grant at the Finnish Film Affair. In an interview with Variety, Ingolfsdottir stated that the film was based on her experience and it had been in development for fifteen years.

== Release ==
Loveable had its world premiere at the 58th Karlovy Vary International Film Festival on 2 July 2024, competing for the Crystal Globe award. It was theatrically released in Norway on 11 October 2024.

== Reception ==
On review aggregator website Rotten Tomatoes, the film holds an approval rating of 100% based on 8 reviews, with an average rating of 7.3/10.

== Accolades ==
Award	Date of ceremony	Category	Recipient(s)	Result	Ref.
Karlovy Vary International Film Festival	6 July 2024	Crystal Globe	Lilja Ingolfsdottir	Nominated	
Karlovy Vary International Film Festival	6 July 2024	Special Jury Prize	Lilja Ingolfsdottir	Won	
Karlovy Vary International Film Festival	6 July 2024	Best Actress	Helga Guren	Won	
Karlovy Vary International Film Festival	6 July 2024	Ecumenical Jury Award	Lilja Ingolfsdottir	Won	
Karlovy Vary International Film Festival	6 July 2024	Europa Cinemas Label Award	Lilja Ingolfsdottir	Won	
Karlovy Vary International Film Festival	6 July 2024	FIPRESCI Award for Crystal Globe Competition	Lilja Ingolfsdottir	Won	
CineFest Miskolc International Film Festival	14 September 2024	Emeric Pressburger Prize	Lilja Ingolfsdottir	Won	
CineFest Miskolc International Film Festival	14 September 2024	International Confederation of Art Cinemas Jury's Prize	Lilja Ingolfsdottir	Won	
CineFest Miskolc International Film Festival	14 September 2024	International Ecumenical Jury Prize	Lilja Ingolfsdottir	Won	
Reykjavík International Film Festival	7 October 2024	Golden Puffin	Lilja Ingolfsdottir	Nominated	
Reykjavík International Film Festival	7 October 2024	Golden Puffin – Special Mention	Helga Guren	Won	
Les Arcs Film Festival	21 December 2024	Crystal Arrow	Lilja Ingolfsdottir	Nominated	
Les Arcs Film Festival	21 December 2024	Jury Grand Prize	Lilja Ingolfsdottir	Won	
Les Arcs Film Festival	21 December 2024	Best Performance	Helga Guren	Won	
Edda Awards	27 March 2025	Foreign Film of the Year	Loveable	Won	
Beijing International Film Festival	26 April 2025	Best Feature Film	Lilja Ingolfsdottir	Won	
Beijing International Film Festival	26 April 2025	Best Director	Lilja Ingolfsdottir	Won	
Beijing International Film Festival	26 April 2025	Best Actress	Helga Guren	Won	
Beijing International Film Festival	26 April 2025	Best Screenplay	Lilja Ingolfsdottir	Won	
Amanda Awards	16 August 2025	Best Film	Lilja Ingolfsdottir and Thomas Robsahm	Won	
Amanda Awards	16 August 2025	Best Director	Lilja Ingolfsdottir	Won	
Amanda Awards	16 August 2025	Best Lead Performance	Helga Guren	Won	
Amanda Awards	16 August 2025	Best Supporting Performance	Oddgeir Thune	Nominated	
Amanda Awards	16 August 2025	Best Newcomer	Maja Tothammer-Hruza	Nominated	
Amanda Awards	16 August 2025	Best Screenplay	Lilja Ingolfsdottir	Won	
Amanda Awards	16 August 2025	Best Editing	Lilja Ingolfsdottir	Nominated	
Amanda Awards	16 August 2025	Best Cinematography	Øystein Mamen	Nominated	
Amanda Awards	16 August 2025	People's Amanda	Loveable	Nominated	
