= For Some Inexplicable Reason =

2014 film by Gábor Reisz

For Some Inexplicable Reason (Hungarian: Van valami furcsa és megmagyarázhatatlan) is a 2014 Hungarian film, the feature-debut of director Gábor Reisz. It stars Aron Ferenczik, who portrays a young unemployed man, somewhat adrift in Budapest, as he tries to cope with a recent break-up, bickering parents, and his adulthood. It premiered at the Karlovy Vary Film Festival in the "East of the West" competition.

The film was awarded the Special Jury Prize and the Audience Award at the 32nd Turin Film Festival. It also won the Grand Prix at the VOICES festival for young European cinema.
