= Ruth Beckermann =

Austrian filmmaker and writer

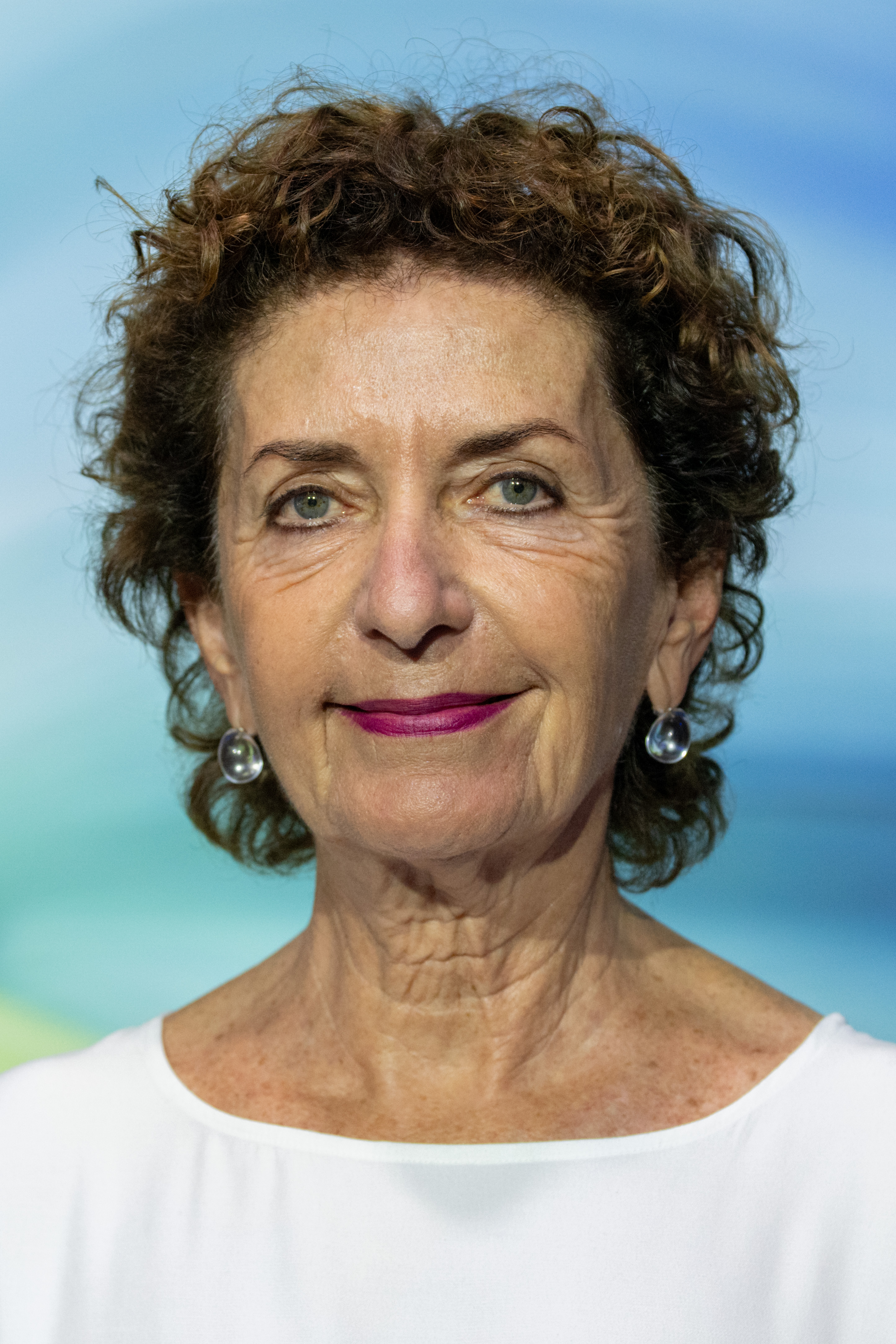
Ruth Beckermann in 2025

Ruth Beckermann (born 1952) is an Austrian filmmaker and writer, who lives and works in Vienna and Paris. Her films have been shown at prestigious festivals, and Paper Bridge and East of War won several major awards.

== Early life and education ==
Ruth Beckermann was born in Vienna, Austria in 1952. Her parents were Jewish survivors of the Holocaust.

Beckermann studied journalism and art history in Vienna and Tel Aviv, and received her doctorate in 1977. In New York she studied photography at the School of Visual Arts. During her studies, she contributed as a journalist to several Austrian and Swiss magazines.

== Career ==
Her first film was made in cooperation with Josef Aichholzer and Franz Grafl of the Videogroup Arena in 1977. Shot on video and 16mm film, Arena Besetzt (Arena Squatted) documented the occupation of the old Viennese slaughterhouse Arena. The following year, Beckermann founded the film distribution company Filmladen along with Aichholzer and Grafl, where she continued working until 1985.

In 1978 and 1981, filmed shot two documentaries, Suddenly A Strike and The Steelhammer Out there on The Grass on the topics of labour and strike.

In 1983, Beckermann released Return to Vienna, which documents the journeys and experiences of Franz West, a Jewish Social Democrat living in Vienna during the First and Second World Wars. The film is the first of a trilogy, in which Beckermann deals with Jewish narratives of loss, memory and identity. Following this film, Paper Bridge (1987) depicts a journey leading from Vienna to Romania, where Beckermann visits the Bukovina region, the birthplace of her father during a time when this region was still under Habsburg rule. In Towards Jerusalem Beckermann travels between Tel Aviv and Jerusalem while exploring the Zionist utopia of a Jewish homeland. These films - Return to Vienna, Paper Bridge and Towards Jerusalem use different forms of travel as both content and formal organising principle.

In 1996, East of War was made during the so-called Wehrmachtsausstellung. In front of the out-of-focus-photographs, former soldiers of the German Wehrmacht talk about their experiences beyond the "normal" war. A film which not only pushes forward the destruction of the "good-Wehrmacht" myth, but also takes a close look at the process of constructing history in post-World War II Austria.

In her 1999 film, A Fleeting Passage to The Orient, she follows the traces of Elisabeth of Bavaria. In 2001, homemad(e) depicts how the political turn in 2000 was reflected in a Viennese coffee house.

Five years later, she followed four 12-year-olds on their journey to Bar Mitzva. was shown in festivals in Paris' (Cinema du Reel,), Vienna (Viennale 06) in Buenos Aires and Chicago, and became a success with audiences.

In 2011, American Passages premiered in the competition at the Cinéma du Réel.

Most of her films – such as, most recently "Wax and Gold" – have premiered at the Berlin International Film Festival or the Cinéma du Réel in Paris.

A DVD collection of her films was released in 2007.

== Other activities ==
Beckermann is a founding member of the Austrian Documentary and Filmmakers Society.

She has authored several books and essays (listed below).

She taught at the University of Salzburg, the University of Illinois, and at the University of Applied Arts Vienna.

== Recognition ==
Beckermann's films Paper Bridge and East of War won several major awards. In addition, she has been awarded the following prizes:

- 2000: Manès Sperber Prize for Literature
- 2015: Österreichisches Ehrenzeichen für Wissenschaft und Kunst (Austrian Decoration for Science and Art)
- 2022: Encounters Award at the 72nd Berlin International Film Festival for Mutzenbacher

== Filmography ==
- Wax and Gold (2026)
- Favoriten (2024)
- Mutzenbacher (2022)
- The Waldheim Waltz (2018)
- The Dreamed Ones (Die Geträumten; 2016), based on correspondence between poets Ingeborg Bachmann and Paul Celan
- Those Who Go Those Who Stay (2013)
- Jackson/Marker 4AM (2012)
- American Passages (2011)
- Zorros Bar Mizwa (2006)
- Homemad(e) (2000)
- A Fleeting Passage to the Orient (Ein flüchtiger Zug nach dem Orient; 1999)
- East of War (Jenseits des Krieges; 1996)
- Towards Jerusalem (Nach Jerusalem; 1991)
- The Paper Bridge (1987)
- Return to Vienna (1983)
- Arena Squatted (1977)

== Books and essays ==
Beckermann, Ruth (ed.), Die Mazzesinsel: Juden in der Wiener Leopoldstadt 1918-1938 (Vienna & Munich: Löcker Verlag, 1984).

Beckermann, Ruth, “Jean Améry and Austria” (translated by Dagmar C. G. Lorenz), in Lorenz & Gabriele Weinberger (eds.) Insiders and Outsiders: Jewish and Gentile Culture in Germany and Austria, pp. 73-86.

Beckermann, Ruth, “Erdbeeren in Czernowitz”, in Christoph Ransmayr, ed. Im blinden Winkel: Nachrichten aus Mitteleuropa (Frankfurt-am-Main; Fischer, 1987).

Beckermann, Ruth, “Beyond the Bridges” (translated by Dagmar C. G. Lorenz), in Lorenz & Gabriele Weinberger (eds.), Insiders and Outsiders: Jewish and Gentile Culture in Germany and Austria, pp. 301-7.

Beckermann, Ruth, “East of War: Shooting Journal, October to November 1995”, in Lendl (ed.), Film Collection: Texte/Texts/Textes, pp. 93-103.

Beckermann, Ruth, “Elisabeth – Sisi – Romy Schneider”, in Beckermann & Blümlinger (eds.), Ohne Untertitel: Fragmente einer Geschichte des österrechischen Kinos, pp. 305-21.

Beckermann, Ruth (ed.), Jenseits des Krieges: Ehemalige Wehrmachtssoldaten errinern sich (Vienna: Döcker, 1998).

Beckermann, Ruth, “We all direct our own memories” (interview with Stefan Grissmemann), in Ruth Beckermann & Stefan Grissemann (eds.), europaMemoria (Vienna: Czernin Verlag, 2003).

Beckermann, Ruth, Unzugehörig: Österreicher und Juden nach 1945 (Vienna: Löcker, 2005).

Beckermann, Ruth (ed.), Leben! Juden in Wien nach 1945 (exh. cat.) (Vienna: Mandelbaum Verlag, 2008).

Beckermann, Ruth, “Das Leben packen: zum Fotoarchiv der Margit Dobronyi”, in Beckermann (ed.), Leben! Juden in Wien nach 1945 (exh. cat.) (Vienna: Mandelbaum Verlag, 2008), pp. 7-16.

Beckermann, Ruth, “Interview with Bert Rebhandl”, 9 August 2007, Ruth Beckermann Film Collection DVD box set.

Beckermann, Ruth, “Commentary” to A Fleeting Passage to the Orient, in Lendl (ed.), Film Collection: Texte/Texts/Textes, pp. 104-14.

Beckermann, Ruth, “American Passages: Auszüge aus dem Arbeitsbuch”, in Horwath & Omasta (eds.) Ruth Beckermann, pp. 96-100.

Beckermann, Ruth, “Entretien avec Ruth Beckermann, American Passages”, Journal du réel #7, 31 March 2011, n.p. 2011), posted at https://www.ruthbeckermann.com/files/uploads/44/03-journaldurelno7.pdf (accessed 27 September 2023).

Beckermann, Ruth, “Growing up Jewish in Austria: A Personal Testimony” (translated by Adrian Sewell) Jewish Culture and History (2013), Vol. 14 Nos. 2-3, 165-70.

Beckermann, Ruth with Alexander Horwath & Michael Omasta, “Cinema should also be about the before, the after, and everything in between”, in Kondor & Loebenstein (eds.), Ruth Beckermann, pp. 15-43.

Beckermann, Ruth, “In Praise of Detours”, in Therese Henningsen & Juliet Joffé (eds.), Strangers Within: Documentary as Encounter (London: Prototype, 2022), pp. 37-42.

Beckermann, Ruth, “This Love has the Character of a Dream” (interview with Karin Schiefer), January 2016 (press release for Die Geträumten), n.p.

Beckermann, Ruth, “Ruth Beckermann introduces her film Mutzenbacher”, Notebook, Column 16, February 2023, at https://mubi.com/en/notebook/posts/ruth-beckermann-introduces-her-film-mutzenbacher (accessed 8 November 2023).

Beckermann, Ruth & Christa Blümlinger (eds.), Ohne Untertitel: Fragmente einer Geschichte des österrechischen Kinos (Vienna: Sonderzahl, 1996).

Beckermann, Ruth & Stefan Grissemann (eds.), europaMemoria (Vienna: Czernin Verlag, 2003).
