= Explanation for Everything =

2023 film by Gábor Reisz

- Theatrical release poster
- Hungarian: Magyarázat mindenre
- Directed by: Gábor Reisz
- Written by: Gábor Reisz; Éva Schulze
- Produced by: Júlia Berkes
- Starring: Gáspár Adonyi-Walsh; István Znamenák; András Rusznák; Rebeka Hatházi; Lilla Kizlinger; Eliza Sodró; Krisztina Urbanovits; Gergely Kocsis
- Cinematography: Kristóf Becsey
- Edited by: Vanda Gorácz; Gábor Reisz
- Music by: András Kálmán; Gábor Reisz
- Production companies: Proton Cinema; MPhilms
- Distributed by: Cirko Film
- Release dates: 1 September 2023 (Venice); 5 October 2023 (Hungary)
- Running time: 151 minutes 127 minutes
- Countries: Hungary; Slovakia
- Language: Hungarian
- Box office: $500,184

Explanation for Everything (Hungarian: Magyarázat mindenre) is a 2023 Hungarian-Slovak drama film directed by Gábor Reisz, who co-wrote the screenplay with Éva Schulze.

The film premiered at the 80th Venice International Film Festival, where it won the Orizzonti Award for Best Film. It was released in Hungary on 5 October 2023.

== Synopsis ==
The film follows four primary characters. Ábel is a high school student in Buda preparing for his matura. György, his father, is an architect with nationalist views from a formerly ennobled family. Jakab, a more liberal history teacher at Ábel's school, is a workaholic. Erika is an ambitious young journalist from Transylvania who works for the conservative daily Magyar Napok (a fictionalized version of Magyar Nemzet).

Having fallen in love with his classmate Janka, Ábel is distracted from studying for his history matura. At work, György tries to convince a younger colleague not to emigrate to Denmark by recounting his family's struggles during the communist era. Janka, meanwhile, confesses her love for Jakab, who rejects her advances; she reveals this to Ábel, crushing his spirits. Janka nonetheless excels during her oral examination, while Ábel freezes up and fails. As Ábel recounts his experience to a furious György, Ábel falsely suggests that Jakab failed him for wearing a cockade. György, remembering a previous political argument with Jakab, believes his son.

György recounts the incident to his doctor, and news of Ábel's fabricated plight spreads by word-of-mouth, reaching Erika by way of a neighbor. Erika interviews Ábel at a café and exaggerates the story's political dimension for professional gain. Her article goes viral, threatening the reputation of Jakab and the school. Jakab's nonchalant attitude in face of the accusations angers both his colleagues and his wife, who suggests his focus on his work has begun to harm their family life. Janka confronts Ábel on the Tabán, berating him for lying about his matura's circumstances and swearing to never speak to him again.

The school district permits Ábel to retake his history matura. Jakab tries to speak to Ábel at his family's apartment, only to wind up in a shouting match with György over his son's academic track record and their divergent political views. Erika is hired as a speechwriter by a government ministry; at her first day at work, she is subtly mocked for her Transylvanian heritage. Ábel's second matura becomes a media sensation, but he walks out of the examination room without attempting to answer his prompt. Jakab and György, who are both present, share a shocked look.

A few months later, Ábel and his friends, Janka among them, sneak into a villa's swimming pool in the middle of the night on the shores of Lake Balaton. As the sun rises, the villa's owner discovers them, and they flee into the lake.

== Cast ==
- Gáspár Adonyi-Walsh as Ábel
- István Znamenák as György
- András Rusznák as Jakab
- Rebeka Hatházi as Erika
- Lilla Kizlinger as Janka
- Eliza Sodró as Dorka, Jakab's wife
- Krisztina Urbanovits as Judit, György's wife
- Dániel Király as Balázs, György's younger colleague
- Gergely Kocsis as Marci, Ábel's high school principal

== Production ==
Explanation for Everything was produced by Júlia Berkes for Proton Cinema, with the Slovak company MPhilms.

== Release ==
Explanation for Everything was selected to be screened in the Orizzonti section at the 80th Venice International Film Festival, where it had its world premiere on 1 September 2023. International sales are handled by Films Boutique. The film was released in Hungary on 5 October 2023 by Cirko Film.

It was also invited at the 28th Busan International Film Festival in 'World Cinema' section and was screened on 5 October 2023.

== Reception ==
=== Critical response ===
On the review aggregator website Rotten Tomatoes, the film holds an approval rating of 83% based on 6 reviews, with an average rating of 6.5/10. Domestic and international critics alike viewed the film as a poignant commentary on political polarization, both within Hungarian society in particular and in Western society more broadly.

=== Accolades ===
Award	Date of ceremony	Category	Recipient(s)	Result	Ref.
Chicago International Film Festival	22 October 2023	Gold Hugo	Explanation for Everything	Won	
Chicago International Film Festival	22 October 2023	Silver Hugo for Best Screenplay	Gábor Reisz & Éva Schulze	Won	
Les Arcs Film Festival	23 December 2023	Best Actor	Gáspár Adonyi-Walsh	Won	
Les Arcs Film Festival	23 December 2023	Cineuropa Andrea D'Aquino Award	Explanation for Everything	Won	
Venice Film Festival	9 September 2023	Orizzonti Award for Best Film	Gábor Reisz	Won	
