= Gábor Reisz =

Hungarian film director (born 1980)

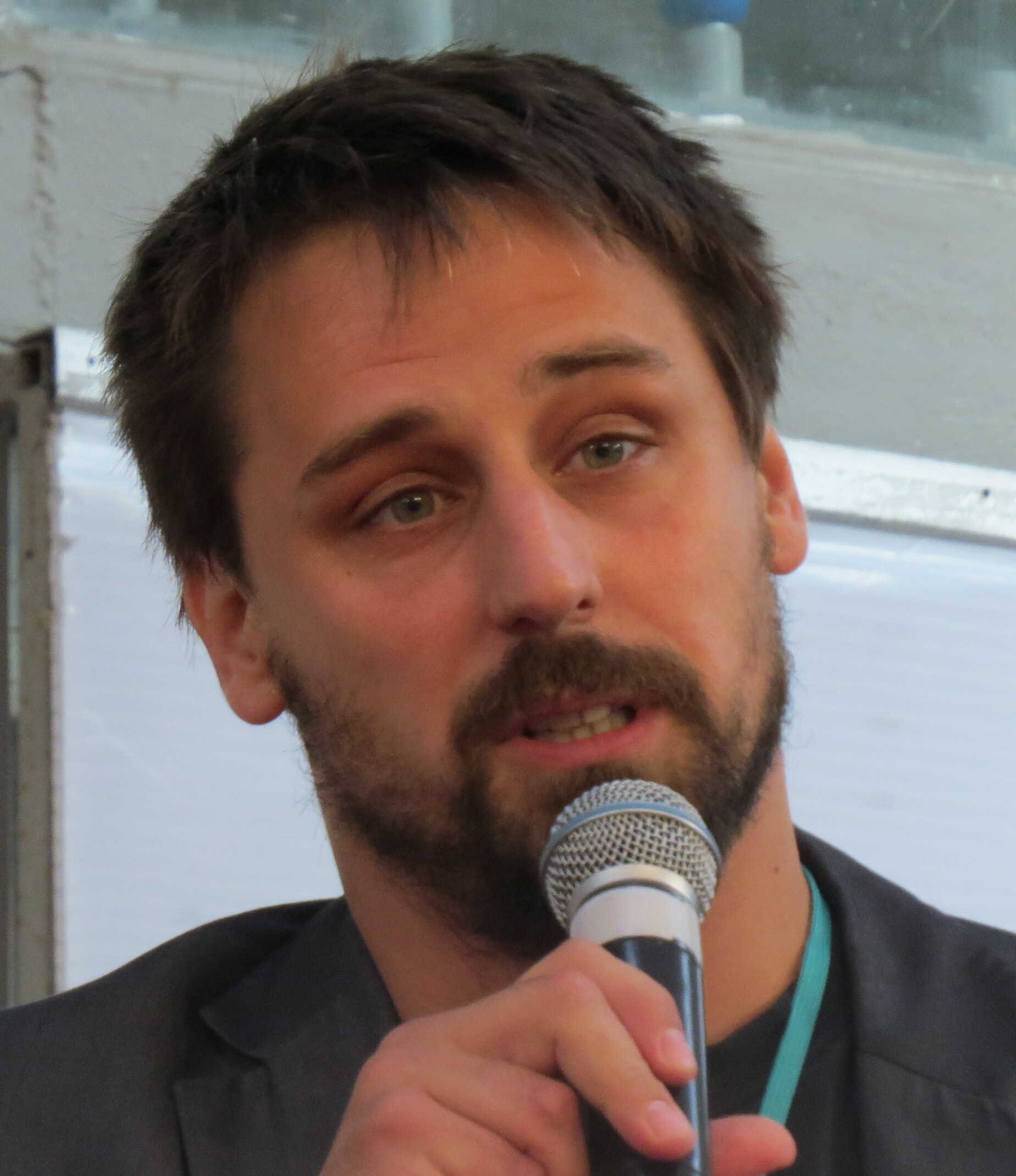
- Reisz in 2015
- Born: 19 January 1980 (age 46); Budapest, Hungary
- Occupation: Film director

Gábor Reisz (born 19 January 1980) is a Hungarian filmmaker, most known for this drama film Explanation for Everything (2023).

== Life and career ==
Born in Budapest, Reisz majored in film theory and film history from the Eötvös Loránd University. His university graduation film For Some Inexplicable Reason premiered at the 49th Karlovy Vary International Film Festival. It received critical acclaim and was awarded the Special Jury Prize and the Audience Award at the Turin Film Festival, and the Best Director Award at the Sofia International Film Festival.

Reisz's second feature film Bad Poems premiered at the 2018 Tallinn Black Nights Film Festival. It won four Hungarian Film Awards including the prizes for best film and best director, was awarded best film at the MonteCarlo Film Fest and received the jury's special mention prize at the 2018 Turin Film Festival.

In 2023, Reisz's Explanation for Everything premiered at the 80th Venice International Film Festival, where it won the Horizons competition. It was later awarded the Gold Hugo at the Chicago International Film Festival.

== Filmography ==
Year	English Title	Original Title	Notes
2014	For Some Inexplicable Reason	Van valami furcsa és megmagyarázhatatlan	
2018	Bad Poems		
2023	Explanation for Everything	Magyarázat mindenre	
2026	Ground Floor	Földszint	
