= Lumière Award for Best First Film =

Annual French film award

- Country: France
- Presented by: Académie des Lumières
- First award: 2014
- Currently held by: Nino (2026)
- Website: academiedeslumieres.com

The Lumière Award for Best First Film (French: Lumière du meilleur premier film) is an award presented annually by the Académie des Lumières since 2014. It was previously known as the Heike Hurst Award for Best First Film, in honour of the film critic.

== Winners and nominees ==
In the following lists, the titles and names with a blue background are the winners and recipients respectively; those not in bold are the nominees.

=== 2010s ===
Year	English title	Original title	Director(s)
2014 (19th)	**Me, Myself and Mum**	**Les Garçons et Guillaume, à table!**	**Guillaume Gallienne**
2014 (19th)	Little Lion	Comme un lion	Samuel Collardey
2014 (19th)	Turning Tide	En solitaire	Christophe Offenstein
2014 (19th)	Headfirst	La Tête la première	Amélie van Elmbt
2014 (19th)	Nous irons vivre ailleurs		Nicolas Karolszyk
2014 (19th)	Beyond the Blood	Au-delà du sang	Guillaume Tauveron
2015 (20th)	**Love at First Fight**	**Les Combattants**	**Thomas Cailley**
2015 (20th)	Party Girl		Marie Amachoukeli, Claire Burger and Samuel Theis
2015 (20th)	Elle l'adore		Jeanne Herry
2015 (20th)	We Did It on a Song	Chante ton bac d'abord	David André
2015 (20th)	May Allah Bless France!	Qu'Allah bénisse la France	Abd al Malik
2015 (20th)	Fool Circle	Tristesse Club	Vincent Mariette
2016 (21st)	**Mustang**		**Deniz Gamze Ergüven**
2016 (21st)	Young Tiger	Bébé Tigre	Cyprien Vial
2016 (21st)	Two Friends	Les Deux Amis	Louis Garrel
2016 (21st)	The Wakhan Front	Ni le ciel ni la terre	Clément Cogitore
2016 (21st)	La Vie pure		Jeremy Banster
2016 (21st)	Vincent	Vincent n'a pas d'écailles	Thomas Salvador
2017 (22nd)	**Divines**		**Houda Benyamina**
2017 (22nd)	Apnea	Apnée	Jean-Christophe Meurisse
2017 (22nd)	Dark Inclusion	Diamant noir	Arthur Harari
2017 (22nd)	Still Life	Gorge cœur ventre	Maud Alpi
2017 (22nd)	The Dancer	La Danseuse	Stéphanie di Giusto
2017 (22nd)	Mercenary	Mercenaire	Sacha Wolff
2018 (23rd)	**Until the Birds Return**	**En attendant les hirondelles**	**Karim Moussaoui**
2018 (23rd)	Les Bienheureux		Sofia Djama
2018 (23rd)	Raw	Grave	Julia Ducournau
2018 (23rd)	Montparnasse Bienvenue	Jeune femme	Léonor Serraille
2018 (23rd)	Patients		Grand Corps Malade and Mehdi Idir
2018 (23rd)	Bloody Milk	Petit paysan	Hubert Charuel
2019 (24th)	**Custody**	**Jusqu'à la garde**	**Xavier Legrand**
2019 (24th)	Little Tickles	Les Chatouilles	Andréa Bescond and Eric Métayer
2019 (24th)	Sauvage		Camille Vidal-Naquet
2019 (24th)	Shéhérazade		Jean-Bernard Marlin
2019 (24th)	The Wild Boys	Les Garçons sauvages	Bertrand Mandico

=== 2020s ===
Year	English title	Original title	Director (s)
2020 (25th)	**The Mustang**	**Nevada**	**Laure de Clermont-Tonnerre**
2020 (25th)	Atlantics	Atlantique	Mati Diop
2020 (25th)	Conviction	Une intime conviction	Antoine Raimbault
2020 (25th)	Les Misérables		Ladj Ly
2020 (25th)	The Bare Necessity	Perdrix	Erwan Le Duc
2021 (26th)	**Two of Us**	**Deux**	**Filippo Meneghetti**
2021 (26th)	Arab Blues	Un divan à Tunis	Manele Labidi
2021 (26th)	Cuties	Mignonnes	Maïmouna Doucouré
2021 (26th)	Slalom		Charlène Favier
2021 (26th)	Simply Black	Tout simplement noir	Jean-Pascal Zadi and John Wax
2022 (27th)	**Gagarine**		**Fanny Liatard and Jérémy Trouilh**
2022 (27th)	Ibrahim		Samir Guesmi
2022 (27th)	Magnetic Beats	Les Magnétiques	Vincent Maël Cardona
2022 (27th)	The Swarm	La Nuée	Just Philippot
2022 (27th)	Skies of Lebanon	Sous le ciel d'Alice	Chloé Mazlo
2023 (28th)	**The Sixth Child**	**Le Sixième Enfant**	**Léopold Legrand**
2023 (28th)	Bruno Reidal, Confessions of a Murderer	Bruno Reidal	Vincent Le Port
2023 (28th)	Harka		Lotfy Nathan
2023 (28th)	The Worst Ones	Les Pires	Lise Akoka and Romane Gueret
2023 (28th)	Everybody Loves Jeanne	Tout le monde aime Jeanne	Céline Devaux
2024 (29th)	**The Rapture**	**Le Ravissement**	**Iris Kaltenbäck**
2024 (29th)	Bernadette		Léa Domenach
2024 (29th)	Junkyard Dog	Chien de la casse	Jean-Baptiste Durand
2024 (29th)	Disco Boy		Giacomo Abbruzzese
2024 (29th)	Vincent Must Die	Vincent doit mourir	Stéphan Castang
2025 (30th)	**Holy Cow**	**Vingt Dieux**	Louise Courvoisier
2025 (30th)	Ghost Trail	Les Fantômes	Jonathan Millet
2025 (30th)	The Kingdom	Le Royaume	Julien Colonna
2025 (30th)	Rabia		Mareike Engelhardt
2025 (30th)	Wild Diamond	Diamant brut	Agathe Riedinger
2026 (31st)	**Nino**		**Pauline Loquès**
2026 (31st)	Block Pass	La Pampa	Antoine Chevrollier
2026 (31st)	The Girl in the Snow	L'engloutie	Louise Hémon
2026 (31st)	Little Jaffna		Lawrence Valin
2026 (31st)	That Summer in Paris	Le rendez-vous de l'été	Valentine Cadic

== See also ==
- César Award for Best First Film
- Louis Delluc Prize for Best First Film
- Prix du Syndicat Français de la Critique de Cinéma — Best First Film
