= César Award for Best First Film =

French film award

- Awarded for: Best Debut Feature of the Year
- Country: France
- Presented by: Académie des Arts et Techniques du Cinéma
- First award: 1982
- Currently held by: Nino (2026)
- Website: academie-cinema.org

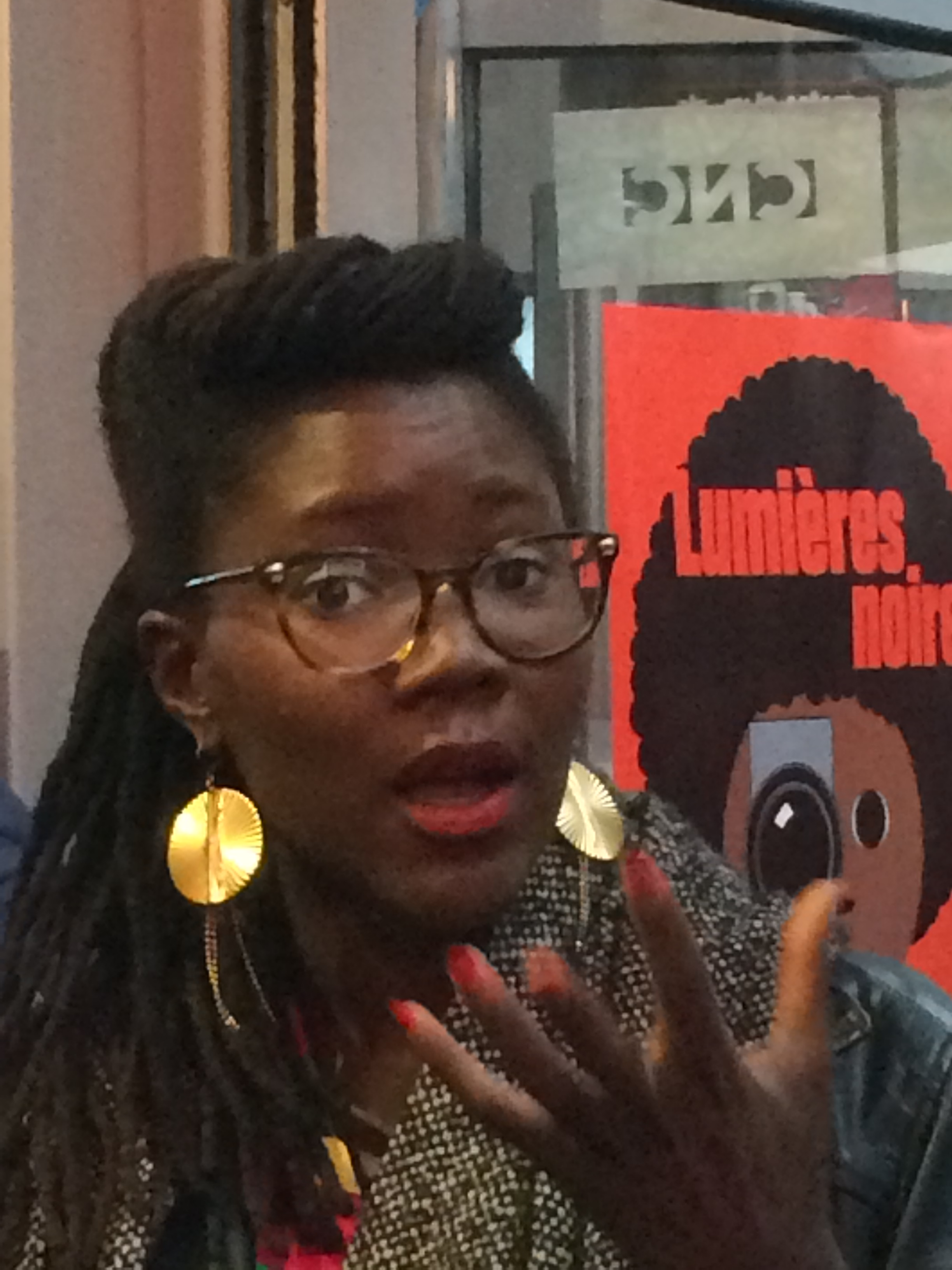
French director Alice Diop in 2017 at the Cinébanlieue festival in Saint-Denis

The César Award for Best First Film (French: César du meilleur premier film) is an award presented by the Académie des Arts et Techniques du Cinéma since 1982. It was originally named the César Award for Best Debut (César de la meilleure première œuvre in French) between 1982 and 1999, and César Award for Best Debut in Fiction (César de la meilleure première œuvre de fiction) until 2005, when it has been renamed again in 2006 to its current name.

== Winners and nominees ==
=== 1980s ===
| Year | English title | Original title | Director |
|---|---|---|---|
| 1982 (7th) | Diva | | Jean-Jacques Beineix |
| 1982 (7th) | Le Jardinier | | Jean-Pierre Sentier |
| 1982 (7th) | Neige | | Jean-Henri Roger and Juliet Berto |
| 1982 (7th) | Dead Certain | Une affaire d'hommes | Nicolas Ribowski |
| 1983 (8th) | Half a Life | Mourir à 30 ans | Romain Goupil |
| 1983 (8th) | Josepha | | Christopher Frank |
| 1983 (8th) | Lettres d'amour en Somalie | | Frédéric Mitterrand |
| 1983 (8th) | Tir groupé | | Jean-Claude Missiaen |
| 1984 (9th) | Sugar Cane Alley | Rue Cases-Nègres | Euzhan Palcy |
| 1984 (9th) | Le Dernier Combat | | Luc Besson |
| 1984 (9th) | Le Destin de Juliette | | Aline Issermann |
| 1984 (9th) | The Trail | La Trace | Bernard Favre |
| 1985 (10th) | Dangerous Moves | La Diagonale du fou | Richard Dembo |
| 1985 (10th) | Boy Meets Girl | | Leos Carax |
| 1985 (10th) | Marche à l'ombre | | Michel Blanc |
| 1985 (10th) | Souvenirs, souvenirs | | Ariel Zeïtoun |
| 1986 (11th) | Tea in the Harem | Le Thé au harem d'Archimède | Mehdi Charef |
| 1986 (11th) | Harem | | Arthur Joffé |
| 1986 (11th) | Strictement personnel | | Pierre Jolivet |
| 1986 (11th) | La Nuit porte-jarretelles | | Virginie Thevenet |
| 1987 (12th) | The Woman of My Life | La Femme de ma vie | Régis Wargnier |
| 1987 (12th) | Black Mic-Mac | | Thomas Gilou |
| 1987 (12th) | I Hate Actors | Je hais les acteurs | Gérard Krawczyk |
| 1987 (12th) | Noir et Blanc | | Claire Devers |
| 1988 (13th) | L'Œil au beur(re) noir | | Serge Meynard |
| 1988 (13th) | Avril brisé | | Liria Begeja |
| 1988 (13th) | Flag | | Jacques Santi |
| 1988 (13th) | Manuela's Loves | Le Jupon rouge | Geneviève Lefebvre |
| 1988 (13th) | Sorceress | Le Moine et la sorcière | Suzanne Schiffman |
| 1989 (14th) | Life Is a Long Quiet River | La Vie est un long fleuve tranquille | Etienne Chatiliez |
| 1989 (14th) | Camille Claudel | | Bruno Nuytten |
| 1989 (14th) | Chocolat | | Claire Denis |
| 1989 (14th) | A Strange Place to Meet | Drôle d'endroit pour une rencontre | François Dupeyron |

=== 1990s ===
| Year | English title | Original title | Director |
|---|---|---|---|
| 1990 (15th) | Love Without Pity | Un monde sans pitié | Eric Rochant |
| 1990 (15th) | Thick Skinned | Peaux de vaches | Patricia Mazuy |
| 1990 (15th) | La Salle de bain | | John Lvoff |
| 1990 (15th) | La Soule | | Michel Sibra |
| 1990 (15th) | Suivez cet avion | | Patrice Ambard |
| 1990 (15th) | Tolérance | | Pierre-Henry Salfati |
| 1991 (16th) | La Discrète | | Christian Vincent |
| 1991 (16th) | Halfaouine Child of the Terraces | Halfaouine, l'enfant des terrasses | Férid Boughedir |
| 1991 (16th) | Mado poste restante | | Alexandre Adabachian |
| 1991 (16th) | Outremer | | Brigitte Roüan |
| 1991 (16th) | Un week-end sur deux | | Nicole Garcia |
| 1992 (17th) | Delicatessen | | Jean-Pierre Jeunet and Marc Caro |
| 1992 (17th) | Les Arcandiers | | Manuel Sanchez |
| 1992 (17th) | L'Autre | | Bernard Giraudeau |
| 1992 (17th) | Fortune Express | | Olivier Schatzky |
| 1992 (17th) | Cold Moon | Lune froide | Patrick Bouchitey |
| 1993 (18th) | Savage Nights | Les Nuits fauves | Cyril Collard |
| 1993 (18th) | Nord | | Xavier Beauvois |
| 1993 (18th) | Riens du tout | | Cédric Klapisch |
| 1993 (18th) | The Sentinel | La Sentinelle | Arnaud Desplechin |
| 1993 (18th) | Le Zèbre | | Jean Poiret |
| 1994 (19th) | The Scent of Green Papaya | L'Odeur de la papaye verte | Tran Anh Hung |
| 1994 (19th) | Wild Target | Cible émouvante | Pierre Salvadori |
| 1994 (19th) | The Son of the Shark | Le Fils du requin | Agnès Merlet |
| 1994 (19th) | Normal People Are Nothing Exceptional | Les Gens normaux n'ont rien d'exceptionnel | Laurence Ferreira-Barbosa |
| 1994 (19th) | Métisse | | Mathieu Kassovitz |
| 1995 (20th) | See How They Fall | Regarde les hommes tomber | Jacques Audiard |
| 1995 (20th) | Colonel Chabert | Le Colonel Chabert | Yves Angelo |
| 1995 (20th) | Mina Tannenbaum | | Martine Dugowson |
| 1995 (20th) | Personne ne m'aime | | Marion Vernoux |
| 1995 (20th) | Petits arrangements avec les morts | | Pascale Ferran |
| 1996 (21st) | The Three Brothers | Les Trois Frères | Didier Bourdon and Bernard Campan |
| 1996 (21st) | To Have (or Not) | | Laetitia Masson |
| 1996 (21st) | Inner City | Etats des lieux | Jean-François Richet |
| 1996 (21st) | Pigalle | | Karim Dridi |
| 1996 (21st) | Rosine | | Christine Carriere |
| 1997 (22nd) | Will It Snow for Christmas? | Y aura-t-il de la neige à Noël? | Sandrine Veysset |
| 1997 (22nd) | The Apartment | L'Appartement | Gilles Mimouni |
| 1997 (22nd) | Bernie | | Albert Dupontel |
| 1997 (22nd) | Encore | | Pascal Bonitzer |
| 1997 (22nd) | Microcosmos | | Claude Nuridsany and Marie Pérennou |
| 1998 (23rd) | Didier | | Alain Chabat |
| 1998 (23rd) | The Other Shore | L'Autre côté de la mer | Dominique Cabrera |
| 1998 (23rd) | Les Démons de Jésus | | Bernie Bonvoisin |
| 1998 (23rd) | The Life of Jesus | La Vie de Jésus | Bruno Dumont |
| 1998 (23rd) | Ma vie en rose | | Alain Berliner |
| 1999 (24th) | Only God Sees Me | Dieu seul me voit | Bruno Podalydès |
| 1999 (24th) | Hinterland | L'Arrière Pays | Jacques Nolot |
| 1999 (24th) | The Kid from Chaaba | Le Gone du Chaâba | Christophe Ruggia |
| 1999 (24th) | The Perfect Guy | Jeanne et le Garçon formidable | Olivier Ducastel and Jacques Martineau |
| 1999 (24th) | The Dreamlife of Angels | La Vie rêvée des anges | Erick Zonca |

=== 2000s ===
| Year | English title | Original title | Director |
|---|---|---|---|
| 2000 (25th) | Voyages | | Emmanuel Finkiel |
| 2000 (25th) | Season's Beatings | La Bûche | Danièle Thompson |
| 2000 (25th) | Les Convoyeurs attendent | | Benoît Mariage |
| 2000 (25th) | Haut les cœurs! | | Sólveig Anspach |
| 2000 (25th) | Karnaval | | Thomas Vincent |
| 2001 (26th) | Human Resources | Ressources humaines | Laurent Cantet |
| 2001 (26th) | Nationale 7 | | Jean-Pierre Sinapi |
| 2001 (26th) | Crime Scenes | Scènes de crimes | Frédéric Schoendoerffer |
| 2001 (26th) | The Squale | La Squale | Fabrice Genestal |
| 2001 (26th) | Stand-by | | Roch Stéphanik |
| 2002 (27th) | No Man's Land | | Danis Tanovic |
| 2002 (27th) | Gregoire Moulin vs. Humanity | Grégoire Moulin contre l'humanité | Artus de Penguern |
| 2002 (27th) | My Wife Is an Actress | Ma femme est une actrice | Yvan Attal |
| 2002 (27th) | Winged Migration | Le Peuple migrateur | Jacques Perrin, Michel Debats and Jacques Cluzaud |
| 2002 (27th) | The Girl from Paris | Une hirondelle a fait le printemps | Christian Carion |
| 2003 (28th) | Beautiful Memories | Se souvenir des belles choses | Zabou Breitman |
| 2003 (28th) | Carnage | Carnages | Delphine Gleize |
| 2003 (28th) | Hypnotized and Hysterical (Hairstylist Wanted) | Filles perdues, cheveux gras | Claude Duty |
| 2003 (28th) | Irène | | Ivan Calbérac |
| 2003 (28th) | Whatever You Say | Mon idole | Guillaume Canet |
| 2004 (29th) | Since Otar Left | Depuis qu'Otar est parti... | Julie Bertuccelli |
| 2004 (29th) | It's Easier for a Camel... | Il est plus facile pour un chameau... | Valeria Bruni Tedeschi |
| 2004 (29th) | Father and Sons | Père et Fils | Michel Boujenah |
| 2004 (29th) | Who Killed Bambi? | Qui a tué Bambi? | Gilles Marchand |
| 2004 (29th) | The Triplets of Belleville | Les Triplettes de Belleville | Sylvain Chomet |
| 2005 (30th) | When the Sea Rises | Quand la mer monte... | Gilles Porte and Yolande Moreau |
| 2005 (30th) | A Common Thread | Brodeuses | Eléonore Faucher |
| 2005 (30th) | The Chorus | Les Choristes | Christophe Barratier |
| 2005 (30th) | Podium | | Yann Moix |
| 2005 (30th) | Work Hard, Play Hard | Violence des échanges en milieu tempéré | Jean-Marc Moutout |
| 2006 (31st) | Darwin's Nightmare | Le Cauchemar de Darwin | Hubert Sauper |
| 2006 (31st) | Anthony Zimmer | | Jérôme Salle |
| 2006 (31st) | Cold Showers | Douches froides | Antony Cordier |
| 2006 (31st) | March of the Penguins | La Marche de l'empereur | Luc Jacquet |
| 2006 (31st) | Little Jerusalem | La Petite Jérusalem | Karin Albou |
| 2007 (32nd) | You Are So Beautiful | Je vous trouve très beau | Isabelle Mergault |
| 2007 (32nd) | 13 Tzameti | | Gela Babluani |
| 2007 (32nd) | Fragments of Antonin | Les Fragments d'Antonin | Gabriel Le Bomin |
| 2007 (32nd) | Bad Faith | Mauvaise Foi | Roschdy Zem |
| 2007 (32nd) | Pardonnez-moi | | Maïwenn |
| 2008 (33rd) | Persepolis | Persépolis | Marjane Satrapi and Vincent Paronnaud |
| 2008 (33rd) | Those Who Remain | Ceux qui restent | Anne Le Ny |
| 2008 (33rd) | Et toi, t'es sur qui? | | Lola Doillon |
| 2008 (33rd) | Water Lilies | Naissance des pieuvres | Céline Sciamma |
| 2008 (33rd) | All Is Forgiven | Tout est pardonné | Mia Hansen-Løve |
| 2009 (34th) | I've Loved You So Long | Il y a longtemps que je t'aime | Philippe Claudel |
| 2009 (34th) | Home | | Ursula Meier |
| 2009 (34th) | Masquerades | Mascarades | Lyes Salem |
| 2009 (34th) | Anything for Her | Pour elle | Fred Cavayé |
| 2009 (34th) | Versailles | | Pierre Schoeller |

=== 2010s ===
| Year | English title | Original title | Director |
|---|---|---|---|
| 2010 (35th) | The French Kissers | Les Beaux Gosses | Riad Sattouf |
| 2010 (35th) | One for the Road | Le Dernier pour la route | Philippe Godeau |
| 2010 (35th) | Spy(ies) | Espion(s) | Nicolas Saada |
| 2010 (35th) | La Première Étoile | | Lucien Jean-Baptiste |
| 2010 (35th) | Silent Voice | Qu'un seul tienne et les autres suivront | Léa Fehner |
| 2011 (36th) | Gainsbourg: A Heroic Life | Gainsbourg (Vie héroïque) | Joann Sfar |
| 2011 (36th) | Heartbreaker | L'Arnacœur | Pascal Chaumeil |
| 2011 (36th) | Lights Out | Simon Werner a disparu... | Fabrice Gobert |
| 2011 (36th) | Turk's Head | Tête de Turc | Pascal Elbé |
| 2011 (36th) | Tout ce qui brille | | Géraldine Nakache and Hervé Mimran |
| 2012 (37th) | When Pigs Have Wings | Le Cochon de Gaza | Sylvain Estibal |
| 2012 (37th) | 17 Girls | 17 filles | Delphine Coulin and Muriel Coulin |
| 2012 (37th) | Angel & Tony | Angèle et Tony | Alix Delaporte |
| 2012 (37th) | Delicacy | La Délicatesse | David Foenkinos and Stéphane Foenkinos |
| 2012 (37th) | My Little Princess | | Eva Ionesco |
| 2013 (38th) | Louise Wimmer | | Cyril Mennegun |
| 2013 (38th) | Augustine | | Alice Winocour |
| 2013 (38th) | Comme des frères | | Hugo Gélin |
| 2013 (38th) | Populaire | | Régis Roinsard |
| 2013 (38th) | Hold Back | Rengaine | Rachid Djaïdani |
| 2014 (39th) | Me, Myself and Mum | Les Garçons et Guillaume, à table! | Guillaume Gallienne |
| 2014 (39th) | Age of Panic | La Bataille de Solférino | Justine Triet |
| 2014 (39th) | The Gilded Cage | La Cage Dorée | Ruben Alves |
| 2014 (39th) | Turning Tide | En solitaire | Christophe Offenstein |
| 2014 (39th) | The Rendez-Vous of Déjà-Vu | | Antonin Peretjatko |
| 2015 (40th) | Love at First Fight | Les Combattants | Thomas Cailley |
| 2015 (40th) | Elle l'adore | | Jeanne Herry |
| 2015 (40th) | Fidelio, l'odyssée d'Alice | | Lucie Borleteau |
| 2015 (40th) | Party Girl | | Marie Amachoukeli, Claire Burger and Samuel Theis |
| 2015 (40th) | May Allah Bless France! | Qu'Allah bénisse la France | Abd al Malik |
| 2016 (41st) | Mustang | | Deniz Gamze Ergüven |
| 2016 (41st) | L'Affaire SK1 | | Frédéric Tellier |
| 2016 (41st) | Cowboys | Les Cowboys | Thomas Bidegain |
| 2016 (41st) | The Wakhan Front | Ni le ciel ni la terre | Clément Cogitore |
| 2016 (41st) | All Three of Us | Nous trois ou rien | Kheiron |
| 2017 (42nd) | Divines | | Houda Benyamina |
| 2017 (42nd) | Cigarettes et chocolat chaud | | Sophie Reine |
| 2017 (42nd) | The Dancer | La Danseuse | Stéphanie Di Giusto |
| 2017 (42nd) | Dark Inclusion | Diamant noir | Arthur Harari |
| 2017 (42nd) | Rosalie Blum | | Julien Rappeneau |
| 2018 (43rd) | Bloody Milk | Petit Paysan | Hubert Charuel |
| 2018 (43rd) | Raw | Grave | Julia Ducournau |
| 2018 (43rd) | Montparnasse Bienvenue | Jeune femme | Léonor Serraille |
| 2018 (43rd) | Mr & Mme Adelman | Monsieur & Madame Adelman | Nicolas Bedos |
| 2018 (43rd) | Patients | | Grand Corps Malade and Mehdi Idir |
| 2019 (44th) | Shéhérazade | | Jean-Bernard Marlin |
| 2019 (44th) | Little Tickles | Les Chatouilles | Andréa Bescond, Éric Métayer |
| 2019 (44th) | Custody | Jusqu'à la garde | Xavier Legrand |
| 2019 (44th) | L'amour flou | | Romane Bohringer, Philippe Rebbot |
| 2019 (44th) | Sauvage | | Camille Vidal-Naquet |

=== 2020s ===
| Year | English title | Original title | Director |
|---|---|---|---|
| 2020 (45th) | Papicha | | Mounia Meddour |
| 2020 (45th) | Atlantics | Atlantique | Mati Diop |
| 2020 (45th) | Au nom de la terre | | Édouard Bergeon |
| 2020 (45th) | The Wolf's Call | Le Chant du loup | Antonin Baudry |
| 2020 (45th) | Les Misérables | | Ladj Ly |
| 2021 (46th) | Two of Us | Deux | Filippo Meneghetti |
| 2021 (46th) | My Best Part | Garçon chiffon | Nicolas Maury |
| 2021 (46th) | Cuties | Mignonnes | Maïmouna Doucouré |
| 2021 (46th) | Simply Black | Tout simplement noir | Jean-Pascal Zadi |
| 2021 (46th) | Arab Blues | Un divan à Tunis | Manele Labid |
| 2022 (47th) | Magnetic Beats | Les Magnétiques | Vincent Maël Cardona |
| 2022 (47th) | Gagarine | | Fanny Liatard and Jérémy Trouilh |
| 2022 (47th) | Slalom | | Charlène Favier |
| 2022 (47th) | The Swarm | La Nuée | Just Philippot |
| 2022 (47th) | The Velvet Queen | La panthère des neiges | Marie Amiguet and Vincent Munier |
| 2023 (48th) | Saint Omer | | Alice Diop |
| 2023 (48th) | Bruno Reidal, Confessions of a Murderer | Bruno Reidal | Vincent Le Port |
| 2023 (48th) | Falcon Lake | | Charlotte Le Bon |
| 2023 (48th) | The Sixth Child | Le Sixième Enfant | Léopold Legrand |
| 2023 (48th) | The Worst Ones | Les Pires | Lise Akoka, Romane Gueret |
| 2024 (49th) | Junkyard Dog | Chien de la casse | Jean-Baptiste Durand |
| 2024 (49th) | Bernadette | | Léa Domenach |
| 2024 (49th) | The Rapture | Le Ravissement | Iris Kaltenbäck |
| 2024 (49th) | Infested | Vermines | Sébastien Vaniček |
| 2024 (49th) | Vincent Must Die | Vincent doit mourir | Stéphan Castang |
| 2025 (50th) | Holy Cow | Vingt Dieux | Louise Courvoisier |
| 2025 (50th) | Ghost Trail | Les Fantômes | Jonathan Millet |
| 2025 (50th) | The Kingdom | Le Royaume | Julien Colonna |
| 2025 (50th) | A Little Something Extra | Un P'tit Truc En Plus | Artus |
| 2025 (50th) | Wild Diamond | Diamant brut | Agathe Riedinger |
| 2026 (51st) | Nino | | Pauline Loqués |
| 2026 (51st) | Arco | | Ugo Bienvenu |
| 2026 (51st) | Block Pass | La Pampa | Antoine Chevrollier |
| 2026 (51st) | Hearts on Fire | L'épreuve du feu | Aurélien Peyre |
| 2026 (51st) | Leave One Day | Partir un jour | Amélie Bonnin |

== See also ==
- Lumière Award for Best First Film
- Louis Delluc Prize for Best First Film
- French Syndicate of Cinema Critics — Best First Film
- Magritte Award for Best First Feature Film
