= Los Angeles Film Critics Association Award for Best Editing =

American film award

The Los Angeles Film Critics Association Award for Best Editing is one of the annual film awards given by the Los Angeles Film Critics Association.

== Statistics ==
Four documentaries have won the Best Editing Award: O.J.: Made in America, Minding the Gap, Apollo 11 and Summer of Soul.

== 2010s ==
Year	Winner	Editor(s)
2012	Zero Dark Thirty	Dylan Tichenor and William Goldenberg
2013	Gravity	Alfonso Cuarón and Mark Sanger
2014	Boyhood	Sandra Adair
2015	The Big Short	Hank Corwin
2016	O.J.: Made in America	Bret Granato and Maya Mumma
2017	Dunkirk	Lee Smith
2018	Minding the Gap	Joshua Altman and Bing Liu
2019	Apollo 11	Todd Douglas Miller

== 2020s ==
Year	Winner	Editor(s)
2020	The Father	Yorgos Lamprinos
2021	Summer of Soul	Joshua L. Pearson
2022	Aftersun	Blair McClendon
2023	Anatomy of a Fall	Laurent Sénéchal
2024	Nickel Boys	Nicholas Monsour
2024	September 5	Hansjörg Weißbrich
2025	Marty Supreme	Ronald Bronstein and Josh Safdie

== See also ==
- Academy Award for Best Film Editing
