= Softie (2021 film) =

- Release poster
- Directed by: Samuel Theis
- Written by: Samuel Theis
- Produced by: Caroline Bonmarchand
- Starring: Aliocha Reinert; Antoine Reinartz; Melissa Olexa; Izïa Higelin
- Cinematography: Jacques Girault
- Edited by: Nicolas Desmaison; Esther Lowe
- Music by: Ulysse Klotz
- Production companies: Avenue B; France 3 Cinéma
- Distributed by: Ad Vitam
- Release dates: 9 July 2021 (Cannes); 9 March 2022 (France)
- Running time: 95 minutes
- Country: France
- Language: French
- Box office: $489.094

Softie (French: Petite nature) is a 2021 French coming-of-age drama film written and directed by Samuel Theis. It follows a troubled ten-year-old boy living with his mother and two siblings in Forbach, northeastern France. It premiered in the Critics' Week sidebar at the 2021 Cannes Film Festival, and won the top prize at the 2021 Thessaloniki International Film Festival.

== Cast ==
- Aliocha Reinert as Johnny
- Antoine Reinartz as Adamski
- Mélissa Olexa as Sonia
- Izïa Higelin as Nora
- Jade Schwartz as Mélissa
- Ilario Gallo as Dylan
- Abdel Benchendikh as Ylies
- Romande Esch as Dylan's girlfriend
- Mérésia Litzenburger as Mérésia
- Danielle Dalhem as school principal
- Maïa Quesmand as Camille
- Claire Burger as Claire

== Production ==
The film was shot in Forbach (Moselle) in 2019.

== Reception ==
Nikki Baughan of Screen International found the film reminiscent of System Crasher and wrote, "it expertly captures [the protagonist's] confusion, fear and anger as he attempts to negotiate both the hardships of life and his burgeoning sexuality." Pat Brown of Slant Magazine called the film "a noteworthy repurposing of the coming-of-age social drama" that provides "a straightforward glance into the experience of navigating a queer identity", giving it two and a half out of four stars.
