= Prix Jacques Prévert du Scénario =

French film (2007)

The Prix Jacques Prévert du Scénario is a French film award created in 2007 by the French Screenwriters Guild (La Guilde Française des Scénaristes), a trade association which represents more than 350 screenwriters working in the film, television and animation sectors in France.

The award is named in honour of the French poet and screenwriter Jacques Prévert (1900 – 1977). It recognises outstanding screenplays of films released in the previous year, in which winners are decided by a jury. The awards ceremony is usually held on 4 February every year to coincide with the birth anniversary of the late writer.

The awards are given in two categories: "Best Original Screenplay" for a screenplay written directly for the screen, and "Best Adaptation" for a screenplay based on a previously released or published work.

== Winners and nominees ==
=== Best Original Screenplay ===
Year	Title	Writer(s)
2007
2007	Jean-Philippe	Christophe Turpin
2008
2008	2 Days in Paris	Julie Delpy
2008	Molière	Grégoire Vigneron and Laurent Tirard
2008	La Vie en rose	Olivier Dahan
2008	Intimate Enemies	Patrick Rotman and Florent Emilio Siri
2008	The Secret of the Grain	Abdellatif Kechiche
2009
2009	Louise Hires a Contract Killer	Benoît Delépine and Gustave Kervern
2009	I've Loved You So Long	Philippe Claudel
2009	Julia	Erick Zonca and Aude Py
2009	The First Day of the Rest of Your Life	Rémi Bezançon
2009	Séraphine	Marc Abdelnour and Martin Provost
2010
2010	Welcome	Philippe Lioret, Emmanuel Courcol and Olivier Adam
2010	The Army of Crime	Robert Guédiguian, Gilles Taurand and Serge Le Péron
2010	Le Concert	Matthew Robbins, Radu Mihaileanu and Alain-Michel Blanc
2010	La Journée de la jupe	Jean-Paul Lilienfeld
2010	A Prophet	Jacques Audiard, Abdel Raouf Dafri, Nicolas Peufaillit and Thomas Bidegain
2011	not awarded	
2012
2012	Tomboy	Céline Sciamma
2013	not awarded	
2014
2014	The Past	Asghar Farhadi
2014	9 Month Stretch	Albert Dupontel
2014	Stranger by the Lake	Alain Guiraudie
2014	Queen of Montreuil	Solveig Anspach and Jean-Luc Gaget
2014	A Castle in Italy	Valeria Bruni Tedeschi, Agnès de Sacy and Noémie Lvovsky
2015
2015	Party Girl	Marie Amachoukeli, Claire Burger and Samuel Theis
2015	Girlhood	Céline Sciamma
2015	Love at First Fight	Thomas Cailley and Claude Le Pape
2015	Eastern Boys	Robin Campillo
2015	Hippocrate	Thomas Lilti, Julien Lilti, Baya Kasmi and Pierre Chosson
2016
2016	My Golden Days	Arnaud Desplechin and Julie Peyr
2016	Adama	Julien Lilti, Simon Rouby and Bénédicte Galup (collaboration)
2016	The Sweet Escape	Bruno Podalydès
2016	The Measure of a Man	Stéphane Brizé and Olivier Gorce
2016	Standing Tall	Emmanuelle Bercot and Marcia Romano

=== Best Adaptation ===
Year	Title	Writer(s)
2007
2007	OSS 117: Cairo, Nest of Spies	Jean-François Halin
2008
2008	The Diving Bell and the Butterfly	Ronald Harwood
2008	Persepolis	Marjane Satrapi and Vincent Paronnaud
2008	Darling	Christine Carrière and Pascal Arnold
2008	A Secret	Nathalie Carter and Claude Miller
2008	Heartbeat Detector	Elisabeth Perceval
2009
2009	A Simple Heart	Marion Laine
2009	Love Me No More	Éric Assous and Jean Becker
2009	The Class	Laurent Cantet, François Bégaudeau and Robin Campillo
2009	The Beautiful Person	Gilles Taurand and Christophe Honoré
2009	Mesrine	Abdel Raouf Dafri and Jean-François Richet
2010
2010	The French Kissers	Riad Sattouf and Marc Syrigas
2010	Farewell	Éric Raynaud and Christian Carion
2010	In the Electric Mist	Mary Olson and Jerzy Kromolowski
2010	Mademoiselle Chambon	Stéphane Brizé and Florence Vignon
2010	Little Nicholas	Laurent Tirard, Grégoire Vigneron and Alain Chabat
2011	not awarded	
2012
2012	The Rabbi's Cat	Sandrina Jardel and Joann Sfar
2013	not awarded	
2014
2014	The French Minister	Bertrand Tavernier, Christophe Blain and Antonin Baudry
2014	Blue Is the Warmest Colour	Abdellatif Kechiche and Ghalia Lacroix
2014	Me, Myself and Mum	Guillaume Gallienne
2015
2015	The New Girlfriend	François Ozon
2015	Asterix: The Land of the Gods	Alexandre Astier, Jean-Rémi François (collaboration) and Philip Lazebnik (collaboration)
2015	Lulu femme nue	Solveig Anspach and Jean-Luc Gaget
2015	Wild Life	Nathalie Najem and Cédric Kahn
2016
2016	L'Affaire SK1	Frédéric Tellier and David Oelhoffen
2016	Macadam Stories	Samuel Benchetrit and Gabor Rassov
2016	Fatima	Philippe Faucon

=== Special Prize ===
Year	Award	Title	Writer(s)
2008
2008	Coup de cœur	Anna M.	Michel Spinosa
2008	Coup de cœur	La Tête de maman	Michel Leclerc and Carine Tardieu
2016
2016	Special mention	April and the Extraordinary World	Franck Ekinci and Benjamin Legrand

== Jury ==
The jury chooses the winners from among the films selected by the Guild.

- 2007: Vincent Perez (President), Éric Assous, Gérard Bitton, Louis Gardel, Randa Haines, Guillaume Laurant, Michel Munz, Jean-Pierre Ronssin and Jérôme Soubeyrand
- 2008: Danièle Thompson (President), Pascal Kané, Olivier Lorelle, Lorraine Lévy, Juliette Sales, Jérôme Soubeyrand, Gilles Taurand, Anne-Louise Trividic, Pierre Uytterhoeven and Philippe Vuaillat
- 2009: Tonie Marshall (President), Gilles Adrien, Santiago Amigorena, Olivier Dague, Jean-François Goyet, Bernard Jeanjean, Olivier Lorelle, Gladys Marciano, Emmanuelle Sardou and Florence Vignon.
- 2010: Jean Cosmos (President), Natalie Carter, Laurent Chouchan, Benoit Delépine, Laurence Ferreira Barbosa, Olivier Gorce, Marion Laine, Benoît Graffin, Jérôme Soubeyrand and Marjane Satrapi
- 2012: Pascal Bonitzer (President), Agnès de Sacy, Claire Lemaréchal, Jean-Marie Duprez, Lise Macheboeuf and Juliette Sales
- 2014: Laurent Tirard (President), Grégoire Vigneron (President), Nelly Allard, Emmanuel Courcol, Guillaume Lemans, Raphaële Moussafir and Fabien Suarez
- 2015: Guillaume Laurant (President), Jacques Akchoti, Jamal Belmahi, Romain Compingt, Manon Dillys, Nadia Lakhdar and Gladys Marciano
- 2016: Éric Toledano (President), Olivier Nakache (President), Agnès de Sacy, Nadine Lamari, Hélène Le Gal, Claude Le Pape and Jimmy Laporal Trésor
