= Laurent Sénéchal =

French film editor

- Occupation: Film editor
- Years active: 2002–present

Laurent Sénéchal is a French film editor. He has been involved as an editor and assistant editor in over 30 television and film productions since the beginning of the 2000s. He is known for his collaborations with Arthur Harari and Justine Triet. For his work on Triet's legal drama film Anatomy of a Fall (2023), he won, among other accolades, the European Film Award for Best Editor. At the 96th Academy Awards, he was nominated for the Best Film Editing.

== Filmography ==
Year	Title	Director	Notes
2002	Bohalle	Benoît Boussard	Short
2005	Des jours dans la rue	Arthur Harari	Short
2007	La Main sur la gueule	Arthur Harari	
2009	Nid d'oiseau	Ho Lam	Short
2010	Des ombres dans la maison	Justine Triet	Documentary
2011	Dahu	Tom Harari	Short
2013	Peine perdue	Arthur Harari	Short
2014	Madeleine et les deux Apaches	Christelle Lheureux	Short
2014	La nuit tombe	Benjamin Papin	Short
2016	Dark Inclusion	Arthur Harari	
2016	In Bed with Victoria	Justine Triet	
2017	Wallay	Berni Goldblat	
2017	Le collectionneur	Thomas Lévy-Lasne	Short
2018	Le cinéma de maman	Valérie Donzelli	Short
2018	Real Love	Claire Burger	
2019	Sibyl	Justine Triet	
2021	Onoda: 10,000 Nights in the Jungle	Arthur Harari	
2023	Dilemne, dilemme	Jacky Goldberg	Short
2023	Anatomy of a Fall	Justine Triet	
2024	Ghost Trail	Jonathan Millet	
2024	Adabana	Sayaka Kai	
2025	Imago	Déni Oumar Pitsaev	
2026	The Unknown	Arthur Harari	

== Awards and nominations ==
Award	Date of ceremony	Category	Film	Result	Ref.
Academy Awards	10 March 2024	Best Film Editing	Anatomy of a Fall	Nominated	
American Cinema Editors Eddie Awards	3 March 2024	Best Edited Feature Film – Dramatic	Anatomy of a Fall	Nominated	
César Awards	23 February 2024	Best Editing	Anatomy of a Fall	Won	
British Academy Film Awards	18 February 2024	Best Editing	Anatomy of a Fall	Nominated	
European Film Awards	9 December 2023	Best Editor	Anatomy of a Fall	Won	
Los Angeles Film Critics Association	10 December 2023	Best Editing	Anatomy of a Fall	Won	
Paris Film Critics Association	7 February 2022	Best Editing	Onoda: 10,000 Nights in the Jungle	Nominated	
Paris Film Critics Association	4 February 2024	Best Editing	Anatomy of a Fall	Won	
San Diego Film Critics Society	19 December 2023	Best Editing	Anatomy of a Fall	Won	
San Francisco Bay Area Film Critics Circle	9 January 2024	Best Film Editing	Anatomy of a Fall	Nominated	
