= Party Girl (2014 film) =

2014 film

- Film poster
- Directed by: Marie Amachoukeli; Claire Burger; Samuel Theis
- Written by: Marie Amachoukeli; Claire Burger; Samuel Theis
- Produced by: Denis Carot; Marie Masmonteil
- Starring: Angélique Litzenburger; Joseph Bour
- Cinematography: Julien Poupard
- Edited by: Frédéric Baillehaiche
- Music by: Nicolas Weil; Sylvain Orel; Alexandre Lier. Additional music : "C'est si bon" by Henri Betti (1947)
- Distributed by: Pyramide Distribution
- Release dates: 15 May 2014 (Cannes); 27 August 2014 (France)
- Running time: 96 minutes
- Country: France
- Language: French

Party Girl is a 2014 French drama film written and directed by Marie Amachoukeli, Claire Burger and Samuel Theis. It won the Un Certain Regard Ensemble Prize and the Camera d'Or award at the 2014 Cannes Film Festival. The story is inspired by the life of Angélique Litzenburger, who played herself in the film, it also stars the co-director Samuel Theis and his siblings Mario, Séverine and Cynthia. The title of the film is derived from the song of the same name by Michelle Gurevich.

== Cast ==
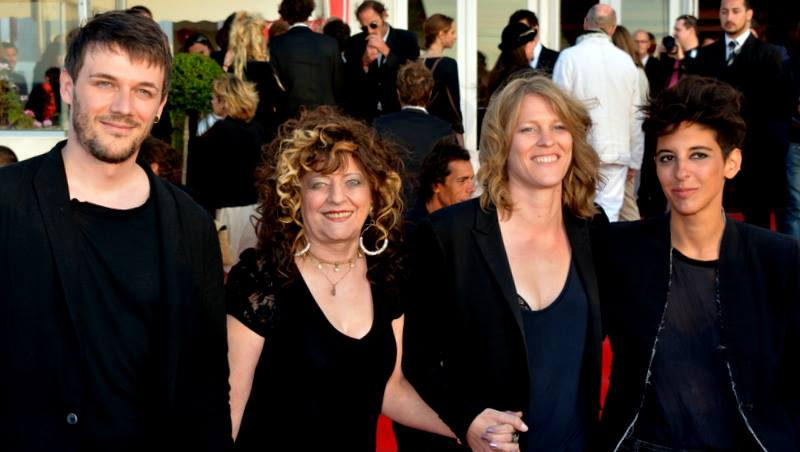
Samuel Theis, Angélique Litzenburger, Claire Burger and Marie Amachoukeli at the 2014 Cabourg Film Festival.

- Angélique Litzenburger as Angélique Litzenburger
- Joseph Bour as Michel Henrich
- Mario Theis as Mario Theis
- Samuel Theis as Samuel Theis
- Séverine Litzenburger as Séverine Litzenburger
- Cynthia Litzenburger as Cynthia Litzenburger
- Chantal Dechuet as Madame Dechuet
- Alyssia Litzenburger as Alyssia Litzenburger
- Nathanaël Litzenburger as Nathanaël Litzenburger
- Meresia Litzenburger as Meresia Litzenburger
- Sébastien Roussel as Sébastien
- Vincenza Vespa as Enza
- Jenny Bussi as Jenny
- Zaina Benhabouche as Zaina
- Marguerite Duval as Marguerite

== Production ==
The film was shot in the Lorraine coal basin of the Moselle department, including in Forbach and the surrounding area, which included Petite-Rosselle, Hombourg-Haut and Spicheren.

== Accolades ==
Award / Film Festival	Category	Recipients and nominees	Result
Cabourg Film Festival	Grand Prix	Marie Amachoukeli, Claire Burger and Samuel Theis	Won
2014 Cannes Film Festival	Caméra d'Or	Marie Amachoukeli, Claire Burger and Samuel Theis	Won
2014 Cannes Film Festival	Un Certain Regard Ensemble Prize	Party Girl	Won
40th César Awards	Best First Feature Film	Party Girl	Nominated
40th César Awards	Best Editing	Frédéric Baillehaiche	Nominated
European Film Awards	Discovery of the Year	Marie Amachoukeli, Claire Burger and Samuel Theis	Nominated
Festival Paris Cinéma	Prix du public	Party Girl	Won
International Film Festival Bratislava	Grand Prix	Marie Amachoukeli, Claire Burger and Samuel Theis	Won
International Film Festival Bratislava	Best Actress	Angélique Litzenburger	Won
International Film Festival Bratislava	Student Jury Award	Party Girl	Won
20th Lumière Awards	Best First Film	Party Girl	Nominated
Odesa International Film Festival	Best Actress	Angélique Litzenburger	Won
Prix Jacques Prévert du Scénario	Best Original Screenplay	Marie Amachoukeli, Claire Burger and Samuel Theis	Won
