= Marie-Ange Luciani =

French film producer

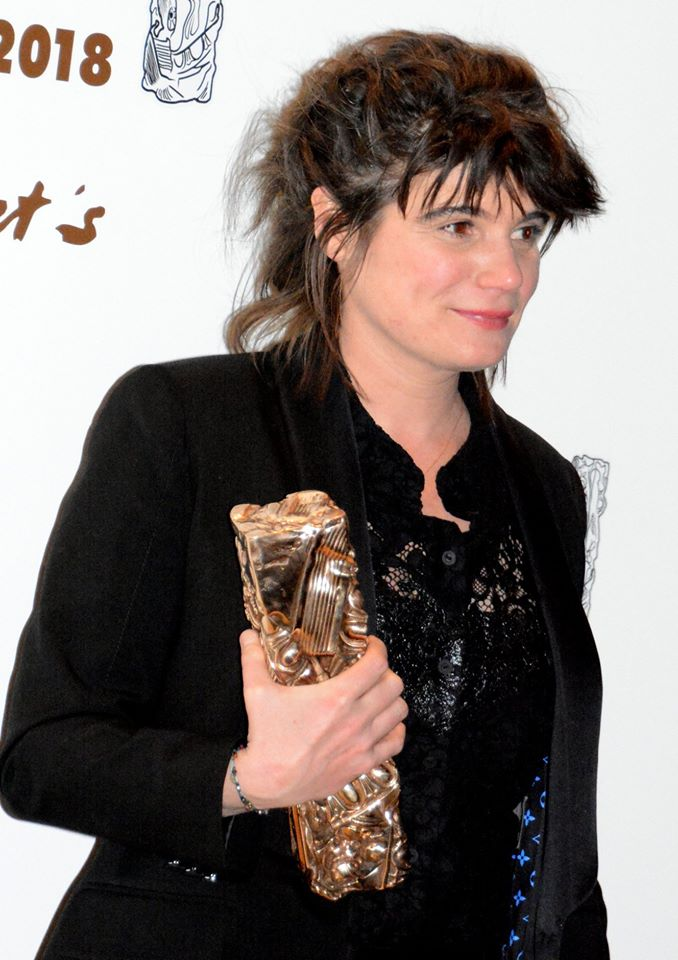
- Luciani in 2018
- Born: 1979 (age 46–47); Corsica
- Occupation: Film producer

Marie-Ange Luciani (born 1979) is a French film producer. In 2018, she was invited to become a member of the Academy of Motion Picture Arts and Sciences. In 2024, she was nominated for two British Academy Film Awards for Best Film and Best Film Not in the English Language, as well as the Academy Award for Best Picture for the film Anatomy of a Fall.

== Selected filmography ==
- 18 Years Old and Rising (2011)
- Salvation Army (2013)
- Eastern Boys (2013)
- BPM (Beats per Minute) (2017)
- Arthur Rambo (2021)
- Anatomy of a Fall (2023)
- Red Island (2023)
- Langue étrangère (2024)
- Enzo (2025)
- The Birthday Party (2026)

== Awards and nominations ==
Award	Year	Category	Film	Result	Ref.
Academy Awards	2024	Best Picture	Anatomy of a Fall	Nominated	
British Academy Film Awards	2024	Best Film	Anatomy of a Fall	Nominated	
British Academy Film Awards	2024	Best Film Not in the English Language	Anatomy of a Fall	Nominated	
British Independent Film Awards	2023	Best International Independent Film	Anatomy of a Fall	Won	
César Awards	2015	Best Film	Eastern Boys	Nominated	
César Awards	2018	Best Film	BPM (Beats per Minute)	Won	
César Awards	2023	Best Documentary Film	Returning to Reims (Fragments)	Won	
César Awards	2024	Best Film	Anatomy of a Fall	Won	
César Awards	2024	Daniel Toscan du Plantier Award	—N/a	Won	
European Film Awards	2017	European Film	BPM (Beats per Minute)	Nominated	
European Film Awards	2023	European Film	Anatomy of a Fall	Won	
Gotham Awards	2023	Best International Feature	Anatomy of a Fall	Won	
Producers Guild of America Awards	2024	Darryl F. Zanuck Award for Outstanding Producer of Theatrical Motion Pictures	Anatomy of a Fall	Nominated	
