= Real Love (film) =

Lola
- Film poster
- Directed by: Claire Burger
- Written by: Claire Burger
- Produced by: Isabelle Madelaine
- Starring: Bouli Lanners; Justine Lacroix; Sarah Henochsberg
- Cinematography: Julien Poupard
- Edited by: Claire Burger; Laurent Sénéchal
- Release dates: 31 August 2018 (Venice); 27 March 2019
- Running time: 98 minutes
- Countries: France; Belgium
- Language: French

Real Love (French: C'est ça l'amour) is a 2018 Franco-Belgian comedy-drama film written and directed by Claire Burger. It stars Bouli Lanners as Mario Messina and Justine Lacroix and Sarah Henochsberg as her daughters, Frida and Nick.

The film had its world premiere at the 75th Venice International Film Festival, where it competed for the Queer Lion. At the 10th Magritte Awards, Real Love won in the category of Best Actor for Bouli Lanners.

== Accolades ==
Award / Film Festival	Category	Recipients and nominees	Result
Crystal Arrow Award	Best Film		Nominated
Crystal Arrow Award	Best Director	Claire Burger	Won
Crystal Arrow Award	Best Actor	Bouli Lanners	Won
Crystal Arrow Award	Most Promising Actress	Justine Lacroix and Sarah Henochsberg	Won
Golden Eye Award	Best International Film		Nominated
Gothenburg Film Festival	Best International Film		Nominated
Magritte Award	Best Actor	Bouli Lanners	Won
Swann Award	Best Film		Nominated
Swann Award	Best Actor	Bouli Lanners	Won
Swann Award	Les Arcs Crystal Arrow	Claire Burger	Won
Swann Award	Critics' Prize		Won
Venice Film Festival	Queer Lion		Nominated
Venice Film Festival	Director's Award	Claire Burger	Won
