= Messi (dog) =

French dog actor

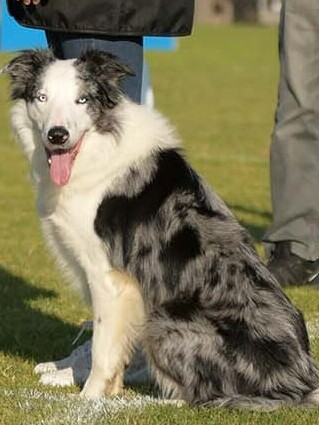
- Messi in 2018
- Species: Canis familiaris
- Breed: Border Collie
- Sex: Male
- Born: 4 April 2016 (age 10)
- Occupation: Animal actor
- Known for: Anatomy of a Fall
- Owner: Laura Martin Contini
- Named after: Lionel Messi

Messi (born 4 April 2016) is a French Border Collie dog actor, best known for his role as Snoop in the 2023 film Anatomy of a Fall, for which he won multiple awards, including the Palm Dog Award at the 2023 Cannes Film Festival.

== Early life and family ==
Messi is owned by dog trainer Laura Martin Contini, who adopted him from a neighbor when he was a puppy. Named after Argentine football player Lionel Messi, he was the first dog that Contini trained for cinema. Messi lives with Contini in a suburb outside of Paris, France.

== Career ==
In 2023, Messi made his film debut playing the role of Snoop in Justine Triet's legal drama Anatomy of a Fall, for which he won the Palm Dog Award at the 2023 Cannes Film Festival, with the jury stating that Messi's performance "covers the gambit... one of the best we've ever seen." Triet told The Hollywood Reporter that Messi's character "was not just another character or some animal running around [but] as much a part of the film's ensemble as any of the other actors." Following his performance in Anatomy of a Fall, Messi became an internet sensation and the subject of several Internet memes.

On 12 February 2024, Messi attended the Oscars nominees luncheon alongside his co-stars from Anatomy of a Fall. On 10 March 2024, Messi attended the ceremony of the 96th Academy Awards and had his own seat in the audience. Before the ceremony, the show's host, Jimmy Kimmel, shared a video in which he could be seen rehearsing his Oscars jokes with the dog. A clip of Messi "clapping" with the aid of his crew was shown during Kimmel's monologue. At the end of the show, Messi was shown appearing to urinate on Matt Damon's star on the Hollywood Walk of Fame as part of the satirical Damon–Kimmel feud. In May 2024, at the 2024 Cannes Film Festival, Messi was hired as a reporter and interviewed celebrities during the festival using the voice of French actor and comedian Raphaël Mezrahi. The show in which Messi interviewed celebrities was titled Messi: The Cannes Festival Seen from a Dog's Point of View.

In June 2024, Messi appeared in the first episode of the French-Belgian miniseries Contre toi. In February 2025, he appeared on the sixth episode of the second season of the French television series Bref.

== Filmography ==
=== Film ===
Year	Title	Role	Notes	Refs.
2023	Anatomy of a Fall	Snoop	Messi's acting debut	

=== Television ===
Year	Title	Role	Notes	Refs.
2024	Messi: The Cannes Festival Seen from a Dog's Point of View	Himself	Television interviews	
2024	Contre toi	Esther's dog	Miniseries; one episode	
2025	Bref	Gontran	One episode	

=== Theatre ===
Year	Title	Author	Director	Ref.
2024	Vers les métamorphoses	Étienne Saglio	Yohann Nayet	

== Awards ==
Year	Award / Festival	Category	Work	Result	Ref.
2023	Cannes Film Festival	Palm Dog Award	Anatomy of a Fall	Won	
2024	Q d'or	Best Dog	Anatomy of a Fall	Won	
2024	Fido Awards	Mutt Moment	Anatomy of a Fall	Won	
2024	Fido Awards	Best in World	Anatomy of a Fall	Won	

== See also ==
- List of individual dogs
