= Langue étrangère =

2024 film by Claire Burger

- French theatrical release poster
- Literally: Foreign Language
- Directed by: Claire Burger
- Written by: Claire Burger; Léa Mysius
- Produced by: Marie-Ange Luciani
- Starring: Lilith Grasmug; Josefa Heinsius; Nina Hoss; Chiara Mastroianni; Jalal Altawil
- Cinematography: Julien Poupard
- Edited by: Frédéric Baillehaiche; Claire Burger
- Music by: Rebeka Warrior
- Production companies: Les Films de Pierre; Razor Film Produktion GmbH; Les Films du Fleuve; Arte France Cinéma; Mitteldeutscher Rundfunk
- Distributed by: Ad Vitam
- Release dates: 19 February 2024 (Berlinale); 11 September 2024 (France)
- Running time: 105 minutes
- Countries: France; Germany; Belgium
- Language: German

Langue étrangère (German: Fremdsprache) is a 2024 tragicomedy co-written and directed by Claire Burger. The film starring Lilith Grasmug and Josefa Heinsius is about a French teenager who visits her pen pal from Germany of the same age and falls in love with her.

The European co-production among France, Germany and Belgium was selected in the Competition at the 74th Berlin International Film Festival, where it competed for the Golden Bear with its first screening on 19 February at Berlinale Palast.

== Synopsis ==
Fanny, a shy and withdrawn French schoolgirl, tormented by bullying from her classmates, arrives in Germany as an exchange student. She is hosted by the family of Lena, a self-assured, sharp-tongued, and politically active girl who lives with her alcoholic mother. The first days are tough: Lena greets Fanny coldly, while Fanny, feeling lonely, calls her mother back in France - a conversation that hints at the first troubling signs of family issues.

Gradually, trust builds between the two girls. Fanny confesses to Lena that she recently attempted suicide due to school bullying and desperately needed a change of scenery. Through tears, she talks about a friend who was denied an abortion and, over breakfast, reveals her deadly nut allergy. Their late-night conversations, shared walks, and common interests dissolve their initial hostility. At a party, under the influence of mushrooms, they kiss.

Lena is particularly struck by the story of Justine, Fanny’s alleged half-sister — her father’s illegitimate daughter, who supposedly belongs to a radical left-wing group. Fanny shows Lena a screenshot from a protest where Justine’s face is visible and admits she’s lost contact with her but wants to find her. This sparks Lena’s interest—she sees it as a chance for real activist work. Soon after, Lena dreams of licking Fanny’s toes in a hot tub.

When the exchange ends, Lena visits France. Together, they search for Justine: they check Fanny’s father’s phone, hand out flyers with the screenshot, and skip school to question people in bars. Fanny’s mother catches them and yells at her daughter. Fanny accuses her father of infidelity, but her mother dismisses it as a lie.

When Fanny leaves, her mother reveals the truth to Lena: Fanny never had a sister, and all her stories — including the one about her pregnant friend — were fabrications. Fanny, she explains, is a pathological liar. Shocked, Lena packs her things. Under the bed, she finds hidden nuts — proof that even the allergy was a lie.

At the train station, strikes cancel departures. There, Lena runs into Fanny’s father and his mistress. He begs her to keep his secret, but Lena replies that Fanny already knew and had told her mother, who didn’t believe her. He says that Fanny lied to impress Lena, because she loves her. Just then, a call comes in: Fanny has locked herself in the bathroom and isn’t responding.

Lena rushes back and finds Fanny in hysterics. Despite her anger, she comforts her. Later, they go to an underground rave frequented by activists from various groups — one last attempt to find the nonexistent Justine. When Lena spots a girl in the crowd who resembles the screenshot, Fanny finally admits: there is no sister. Lena, already knowing the truth, isn’t mad. The girls share a passionate kiss and then have sex.

Fanny returns to Germany. At the station, they kiss one last time, and Fanny, already on the train, cries by the window. The film ends with protest footage: among the demonstrators are Lena and Fanny, being pulled apart by the police.

== Cast ==
- Lilith Grasmug as Fanny Brussieux Ait Chergui
- Josefa Heinsius as Lena Schreber
- Nina Hoss as Suzanne Schreber
- Chiara Mastroianni as Antonia Brussieux
- Jalal Altawil as Anthar Ait Chergui
- Robert Gwisdek
- Yuri Völsch as Lukas
- Christa Rockstroh
- Hermann Beyer
- Prune De Moya as Élève
- Raffaela Lanci as Raffaela
- Anna Hedderich as Justine
- Jakob Diehl as Tobias

== Production ==
The film is directed by Claire Burger for Les Films de Pierre. Julien Poupard and Frédéric Baillehaiche are respectively cinematographer and editor of the film. Rebeka Warrior composed the music of the film.

Produced by Marie-Ange Luciani for Les Films de Pierre, the film is being co-produced by Arte France Cinéma, Razor Film Produktion and Les Films du Fleuve. Ad Vitam have the French distribution rights while the German rights are with Port au Prince Pictures. The international sales are done by Goodfellas.

Principal photography began on 20 March 2023 in Leipzig and Strasbourg. Filming ended on 6 May 2023 with filming locations in the regions of Grand Est in France and Saxony in Germany.

== Release ==
Langue étrangère had its world premiere on 19 February 2024, as part of the 74th Berlin International Film Festival, in Competition.

It was screened at Lichter Filmfest Frankfurt International, Frankfurt on 17 April 2024.

It was released in French theaters on 11 September 2024 by Ad Vitam.

It had its North American premiere at the Inside Out Film and Video Festival on 31 May 2024.

== Reception ==
On the review aggregator Rotten Tomatoes website, the film has an approval rating of 91% based on 11 reviews, with an average rating of 6.6/10.

Peter Debruge reviewing in Variety said, "Langue Étrangère is more than just another same-sex first-love story, by exploring the cultural differences between a French and German girl — as well as their classmates in both schools — Burger taps into the broader way these neighboring countries relate today, nearly 80 years after World War 2."

Matthew Joseph Jenner reviewed the film for the International Cinephile Society, writing that "brilliantly subversive and genuinely poignant in both form and content, Langue Étrangère proves to be one of the year’s most layered and poetic dramas."

Jordan Mintzer reviewing the film for The Hollywood Reporter dubbed it as "A moving cross-cultural coming-of-ager," and wrote, "The director movingly reveals how... shifting identifies put two girls on a path to find each other and, ultimately, themselves."

Nicholas Bell in Ion Cinema rated the film with two and half stars and said, "The success of the film rests almost entirely on the performances of Lilith Grasmug and Josefa Heinsius, who are reminiscent of both Virginie Ledoyen and Sairose Ronan, respectively." Concluding Bell wrote, "A score from Rebeka Warrior, which spins a theme around the budding romance, is an effective touch."

Jonathan Romney reviewing the film at Berlinale, wrote in ScreenDaily "Serious-minded political themes, simmering tension and tenderness between the two young leads, and an overall intelligence combine to just about overcome a final collapse into contrivance."

Ola Salwa reviewing the film at Berlinale for Cineuropa wrote, "Young actresses Lilith Grasmug and Josefa Heinsius are the beating heart of this coming-of-age drama by Claire Burger, revolving around a language exchange trip to Germany."

== Accolades ==
The film was selected in Competition at the 74th Berlin International Film Festival, thus it was nominated to compete for Golden Bear award.

Award	Date	Category	Recipient	Result	Ref.
Berlin International Film Festival	25 February 2024	Golden Bear	Claire Burger	Nominated	
Berlin International Film Festival	25 February 2024	Teddy Award for Best Feature Film	Claire Burger	Nominated	
