= Marie Amachoukeli =

French film director and screenwriter (born 1979)

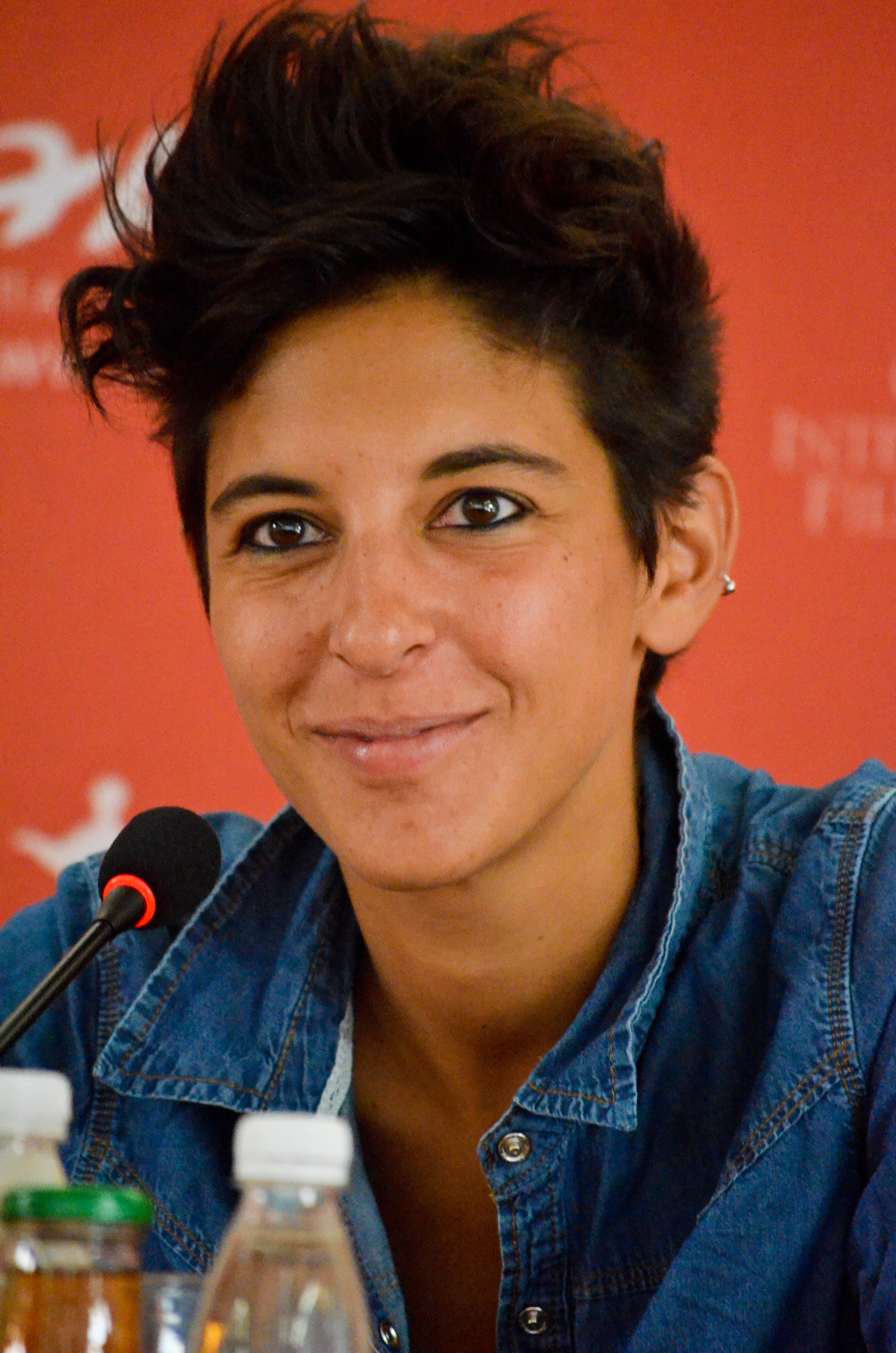
- Marie Amachoukeli at the 2014 Odesa International Film Festival
- Born: 16 July 1979 (age 46); Paris, France
- Occupations: Film director, screenwriter
- Years active: 2005–present

Marie Amachoukeli (born 16 July 1979), sometimes credited as Marie Amachoukeli-Barsacq, is a French film director and screenwriter of Georgian descent. Her directorial debut Party Girl competed in the Un Certain Regard section at the 2014 Cannes Film Festival and won the Camera d'Or.

== Biography ==
The daughter of Franco-Georgian sculptor Goudji, sister of the publisher Stéphane Barsacq, and granddaughter of the playwright André Barsacq, Marie Amachoukeli studied at La Fémis.

She co-wrote the film Forbach with Claire Burger, which won an award at the Clermont-Ferrand International Short Film Festival. She then co-directed C'est gratuit pour les filles with Burger, which was selected for the Critics' Week at the Cannes Film Festival and won the César Award for Best Short Film, followed by Demolition Party in 2013.

In 2014, she made her feature film directorial debut alongside Claire Burger and Samuel Theis with Party Girl. The film won the Caméra d'or at the 2014 Cannes Film Festival as well as numerous international awards.

In 2017, she collaborated with Vladimir Mavounia-Kouka on I Want Pluto to Be a Planet Again, a black-and-white animated short film that was nominated for a César Award in 2018.

As a screenwriter, she has collaborated with directors such as Franco Lolli, Clément Cogitore, Guillaume Gouix, Cyprien Vial, and Julia Ducournau.

She served as a jury member for the Caméra d'or, chaired by Ursula Meier, during the 71st Cannes Film Festival in May 2018. The winning debut feature film was Girl by Lukas Dhont.

She is a member of the Collectif 50/50, an organization aimed at promoting gender equality and gender and sexual diversity in the film and audiovisual industries.

In 2020, the Institut national de l'audiovisuel (INA) granted her carte blanche along with Zabou Breitman and Michel Hazanavicius to create a new short format centered around archival footage.

In 2023, her feature film Àma Gloria was selected to open the Critics' Week parallel section at the 2023 Cannes Film Festival.

== Filmography ==
Year	Title	Credited as		Notes
Year	Title	Director	Screenwriter	Notes
2005	Tantalus		Yes	Short film
2006	La Traversée		Yes	Short film
2007	L'Arbre d'Hugo	Yes		
2007	Raymond		Yes	TV series
2008	Madame		Yes	Short film
2008	Forbach	Yes	Yes	Short film
2009	It's Free for Girls	Yes	Yes	Short film César Award for Best Short Film
2010	La Femme à Cordes		Yes	
2013	Demolition Party	Yes	Yes	Short film
2014	Party Girl	Yes	Yes	Camera d'Or (2014 Cannes Film Festival) (shared with Claire Burger and Samuel Theis); Cabourg Film Festival – Grand Prix; Prix Jacques Prévert du Scénario for Best Original Screenplay; Nominated—César Award for Best First Feature Film; Nominated—European Film Award for European Discovery of the Year; Nominated—Lumière Award for Best First Film
2014	Young Tiger		Yes	Storyline consultant
2019	Litigante		Yes	Co-writer
