= Nino (2025 film) =

2025 French drama film

- Film poster
- Directed by: Pauline Loquès
- Written by: Maud Ameline; Pauline Loquès
- Produced by: Sandra De Fonseca
- Starring: Théodore Pellerin; William Lebghil; Salome Dewaels; Jeanne Balibar
- Cinematography: Lucie Baudinaud
- Edited by: Clémence Diard
- Production company: Blue Monday Productions
- Distributed by: Day2Feast
- Release date: 18 May 2025 (Cannes)
- Running time: 97 minutes
- Country: France
- Language: French

Nino is a 2025 French drama film directed by Pauline Loquès, co-written by Loquès and Maud Ameline. Starring Théodore Pellerin as Nino, it follows a shy young man who has been diagnosed with throat cancer on the eve of his 29th birthday, and must confront his possible mortality over the weekend before beginning chemotherapy.

The film had its world premiere in the Critics' Week section of the 2025 Cannes Film Festival on 18 May, where Pellerin won the Louis Roederer Foundation Rising Star Award. It received four nominations at the 51st César Awards, winning Best First Feature Film and Best Male Revelation for Pellerin.

== Cast ==
- Théodore Pellerin as Nino
- William Lebghil
- Salomé Dewaels
- Jeanne Balibar
- Camille Rutherford
- Estelle Meyer
- Victoire Du Bois
- Mathieu Amalric

== Production ==
Loquès's full-length directorial debut, the film was shot in fall 2024 in Paris.

== Release ==
The film premiered in the Critics' Week program at the 2025 Cannes Film Festival, where Pellerin won the Louis Roederer Foundation Rising Star Award.

It was screened in the Platform Prize program at the 2025 Toronto International Film Festival on 7 September 2025.

The film competed in the 'Progressive Cinema Competition - Visions for the World of Tomorrow' section of the 20th Rome Film Festival in October 2025.

== Critical response ==
Allan Hunter of Screen Daily wrote that "Nino is not a film that tugs at the heartstrings. It is quietly observant, encouraging a feeling of intimacy through extensive use of close-ups and the comforting anonymity to be found in a big city. Exposing Nino to friends, family and the wisdom of strangers (including a brief cameo from Mathieu Almaric) gently leads him down a path towards choosing life. Pellerin successfully inhabits Nino's diffidence and reserve, but his modest smiles and fond looks effectively convey how the character gradually warms up."

For Cineuropa, Fabien Lemercier wrote that "naturally moving, the film nevertheless successfully combines lightness, tenderness and humour with the dramatic heart of its subject, allowing the director to explore in small ways the difficulties (inherent in the modern world) of expressing, feeling, really looking at others, opening the window to free one's emotions and share them."
