= Anatomy of a Fall =

2023 film by Justine Triet

- Theatrical release poster
- French: Anatomie d'une chute
- Directed by: Justine Triet
- Written by: Justine Triet; Arthur Harari
- Produced by: Marie-Ange Luciani; David Thion
- Starring: Sandra Hüller; Swann Arlaud; Milo Machado-Graner; Antoine Reinartz; Samuel Theis; Jehnny Beth; Saadia Bentaïeb; Camille Rutherford; Anne Rotger; Sophie Fillières
- Cinematography: Simon Beaufils
- Edited by: Laurent Sénéchal
- Production companies: Les Films Pelléas; Les Films de Pierre
- Distributed by: Le Pacte
- Release dates: 21 May 2023 (Cannes); 23 August 2023 (France)
- Running time: 152 minutes
- Country: France
- Languages: French; English (Note: While the official website of the film's international sales agent, mk2 Films, lists German among the film's languages, the theatrical release contains no German dialogue.)
- Budget: €6.2 million ($6.7 million)
- Box office: $48.8 million

Anatomy of a Fall (French: Anatomie d'une chute) is a 2023 French legal drama film directed by Justine Triet from a screenplay she co-wrote with Arthur Harari. It stars Sandra Hüller as a writer trying to prove her innocence in her husband's death. Appearing in supporting roles are Swann Arlaud, Milo Machado-Graner, Antoine Reinartz, Samuel Theis, Jehnny Beth, Saadia Bentaïeb, Camille Rutherford, Anne Rotger, and Sophie Fillières.

The film premiered at the 76th Cannes Film Festival on 21 May 2023, where it won the Palme d'Or and the Palm Dog Award, and competed for the Queer Palm. It was released theatrically in France by Le Pacte on 23 August 2023, receiving critical acclaim, selling over 1.9 million admissions in France, and winning six awards at the 49th César Awards, including Best Film. The film also received five nominations at the 96th Academy Awards, including Best Picture, Best Director (Triet), Best Actress (Hüller), and won Best Original Screenplay.

== Plot ==
In 2018, in an isolated mountain chalet near Grenoble, novelist Sandra Voyter decides to reschedule her interview with a female student because her husband, university lecturer Samuel Maleski, plays music loudly in their attic, disrupting the interview. After the student drives away from the chalet, Sandra's eleven-year-old son Daniel, who is visually impaired, takes a walk outside with his dog Snoop. When they return home, Daniel finds Samuel dead from an apparent fall.

Sandra insists that the fall must have been accidental. Her old friend and lawyer, Vincent, suggests the possibility of suicide, while Sandra recalls her husband's attempt to overdose on aspirin six months earlier, after going off antidepressants. After an investigation, Daniel's conflicting accounts of what happened shortly before his father's death, combined with the revelation that Samuel sustained a head wound before his body hit the ground and an audio recording of a fight between Samuel and Sandra the previous day, Sandra is indicted on charges of homicide. She is released on bail soon after.

One year later, Sandra's trial begins. Her defense team claims Samuel fell from the attic window and hit his head on a shed below, while the prosecution posits that Sandra hit him with a blunt object and pushed him from the second-floor balcony. During a courtroom argument with Samuel's psychiatrist, Sandra admits her resentment toward her husband due to his partial responsibility for the accident that led to Daniel's impaired vision.

In the recorded fight, Samuel accuses Sandra of plagiarism, infidelity, and exerting control over his life, before their protracted argument turns physically violent. The prosecution claims that all the violence came from Sandra. She counters that while she had slapped Samuel, the rest of the violence heard was her husband self-harming. After Sandra admits to an affair with a woman the year before Samuel's death, the prosecution argues that Samuel's loud music indicated jealousy over Sandra's flirting with the interviewer, leading to the physical confrontation later. The prosecutor also notes Sandra's pattern of writing personal conflicts into her stories, and how murdering her husband mirrors a minor character's thoughts from her most recent novel. In turn, Sandra protests that one recording does not represent the nature of their relationship, nor do the words of a character in a novel reflect her own inclinations.

A distraught Daniel insists on testifying before closing arguments the following Monday. The judge lays strict ground rules to prevent anyone from influencing his testimony and brings in a court monitor, Marge. Daniel then asks that Sandra leave their house for the weekend so he can be alone with Marge and Snoop. He recalls that when Samuel overdosed, Snoop also fell sick, possibly due to having eaten Samuel's vomit. He then deliberately feeds Snoop aspirin and finds it has the same effect, which aligns with Sandra's testimony. Daniel confides to Marge his anguish, and she advises him that if he does not know what is really true, he can instead decide what is true for him.

On the witness stand, Daniel says he can comprehend his father taking his own life but not the murder scenario. He says that when he and Samuel were driving Snoop to the veterinarian, Samuel spoke about the need to be prepared that those he loves will die and to know that his life will go on, which Daniel now interprets as his father's own suicidal thoughts. Sandra is acquitted following Daniel's testimony. She, Vincent, and others get dinner and drinks. When she returns home, Daniel tells her he was afraid of her homecoming and she says that she was too; the two embrace. As Sandra heads to bed, she lingers at a photo of her and Samuel before falling asleep with Snoop.

== Cast ==
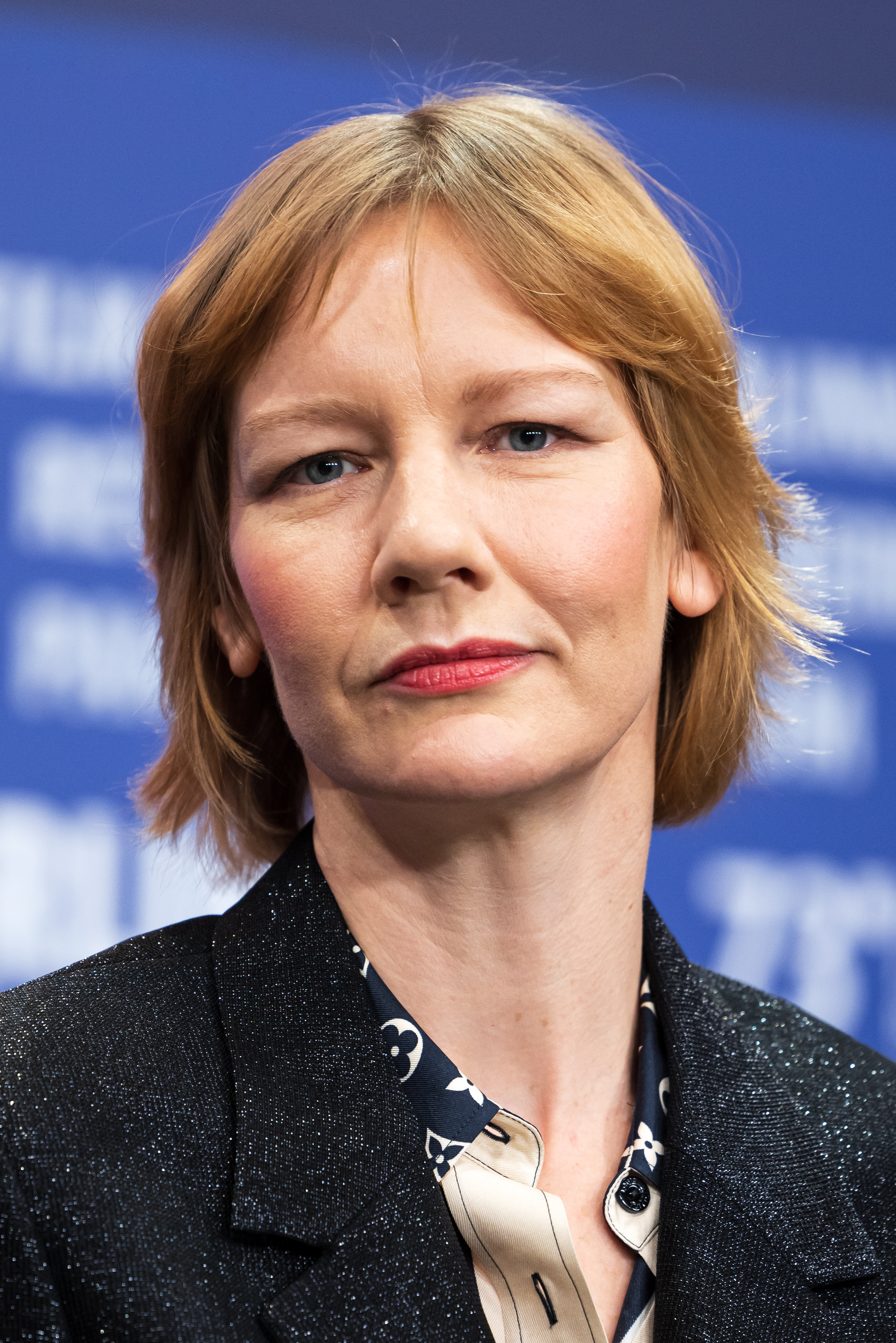
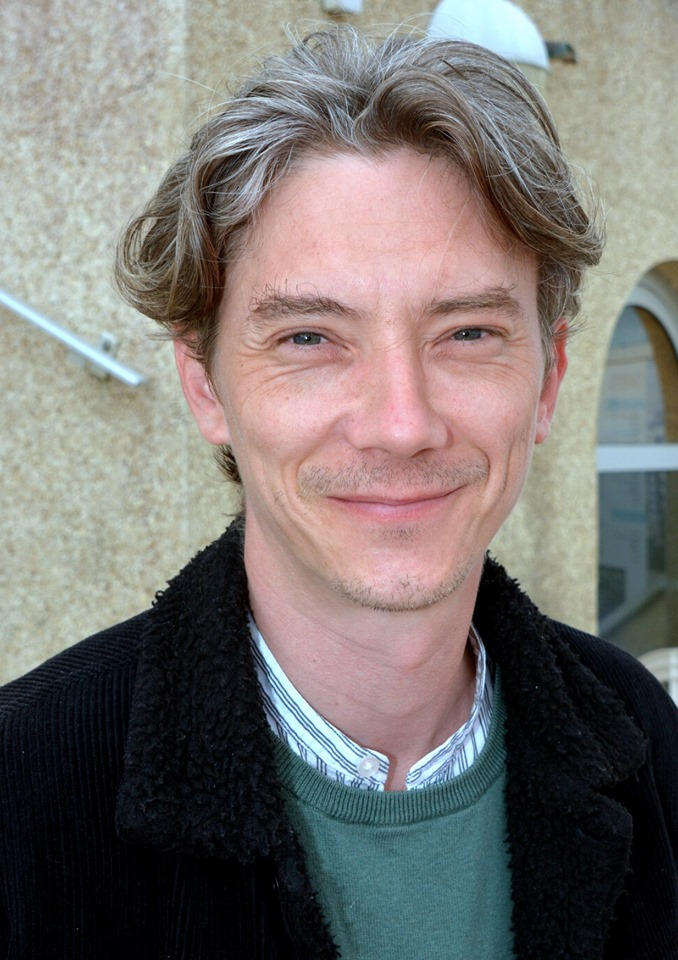
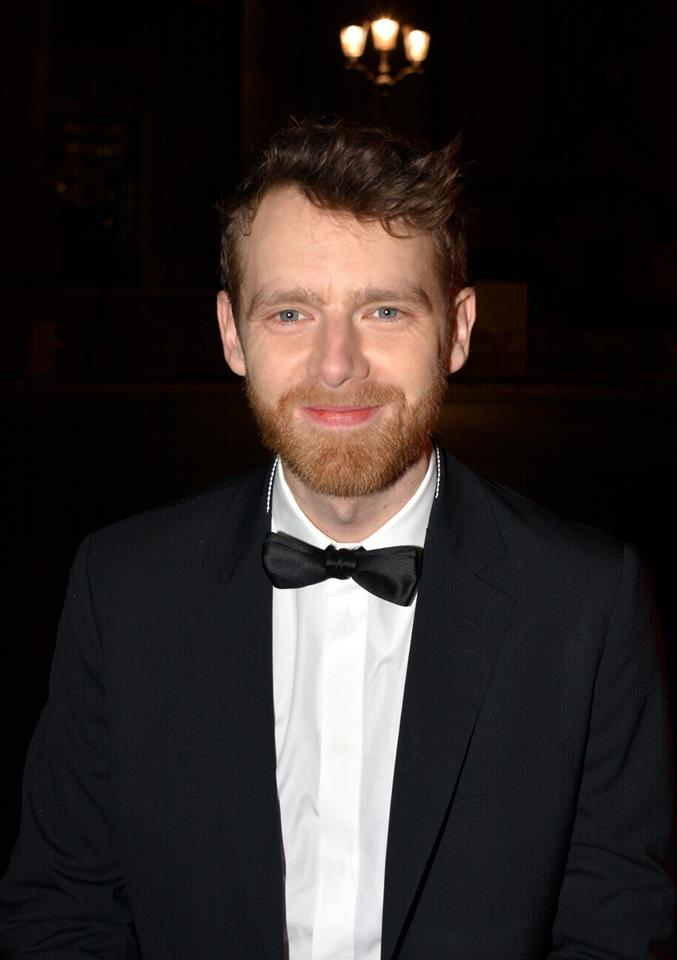
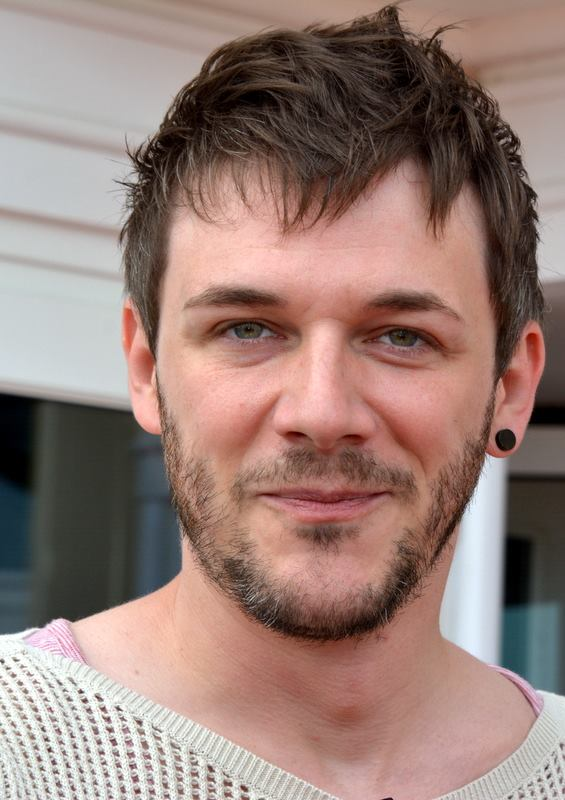
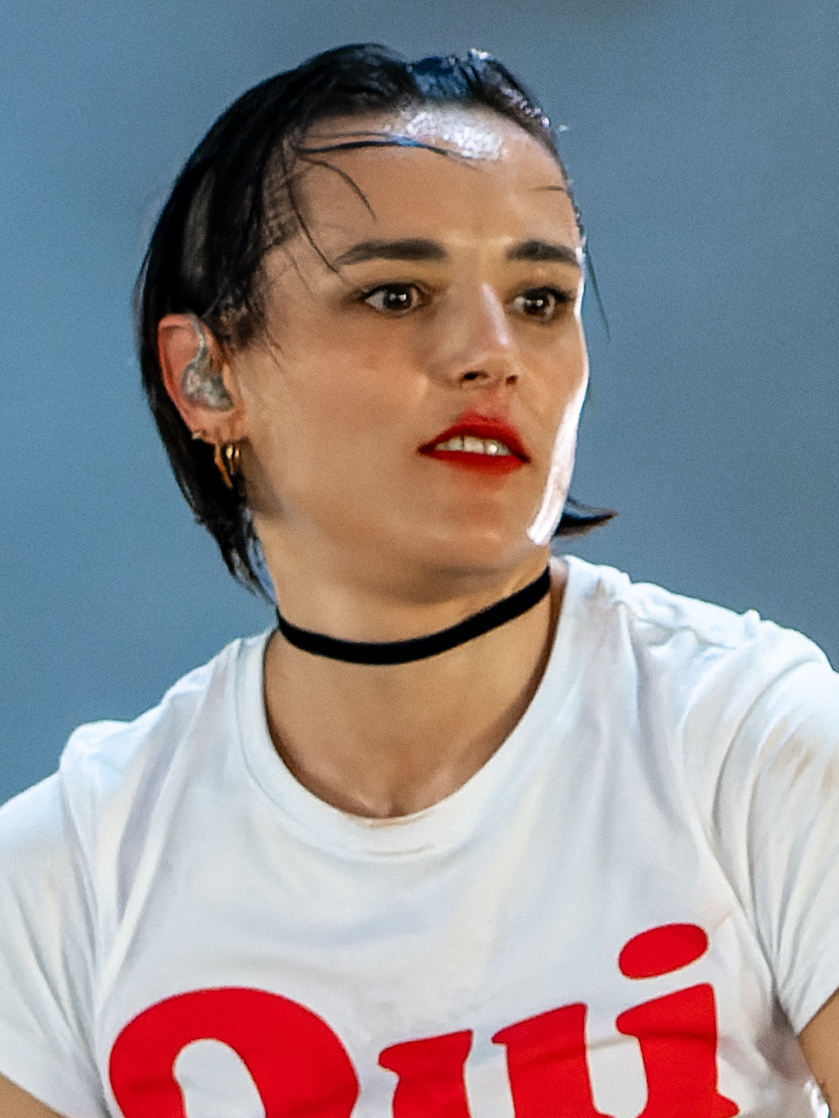
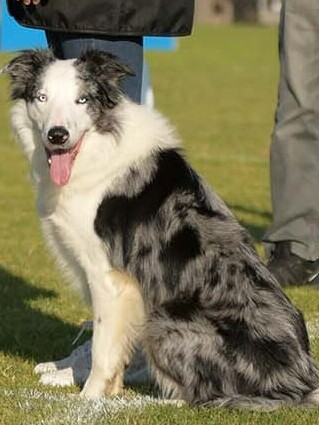
From left to right: Sandra Hüller, Swann Arlaud, Antoine Reinartz, Samuel Theis, Jehnny Beth, and Messi
- Sandra Hüller as Sandra Voyter
- Swann Arlaud as Vincent Renzi
- Milo Machado-Graner as Daniel Maleski
- Antoine Reinartz as the prosecutor
- Samuel Theis as Samuel Maleski
- Jehnny Beth as Marge Berger
- Saadia Bentaïeb as Nour
- Camille Rutherford as Zoé Solidor
- Anne Rotger as the President
- Sophie Fillières as Monica
- Messi as Snoop

== Production ==
=== Development ===
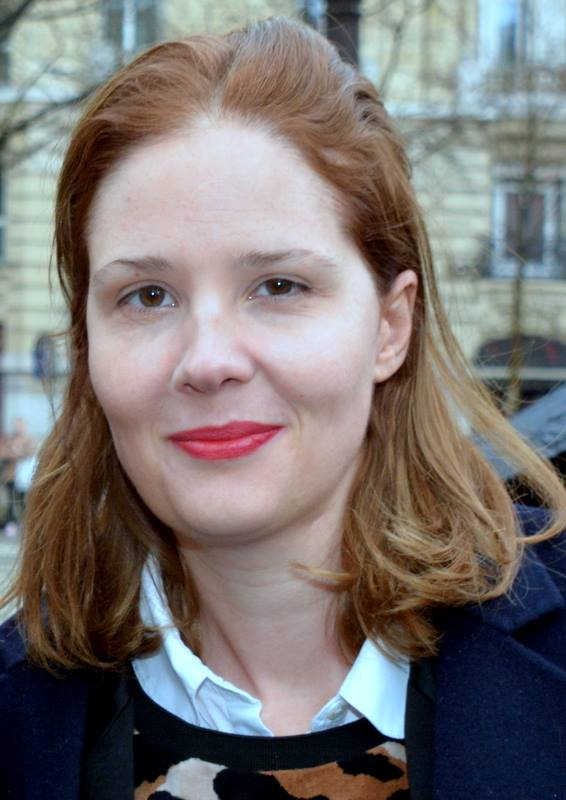
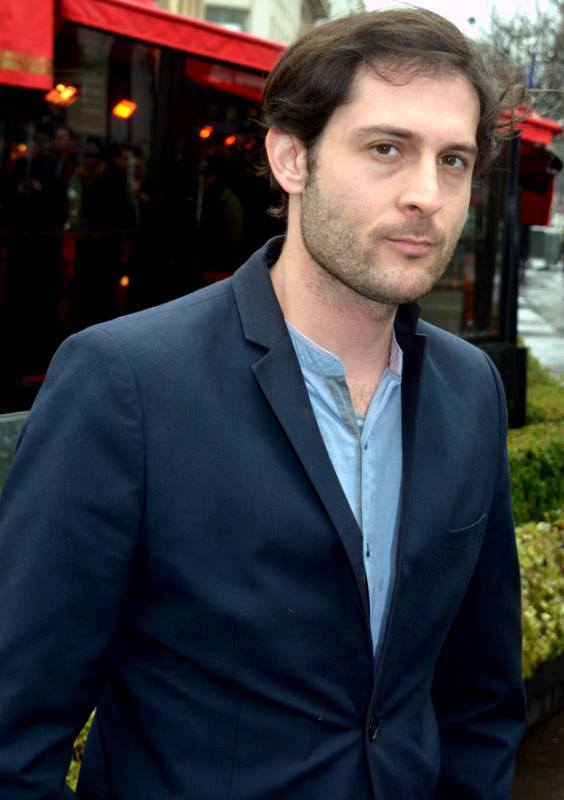
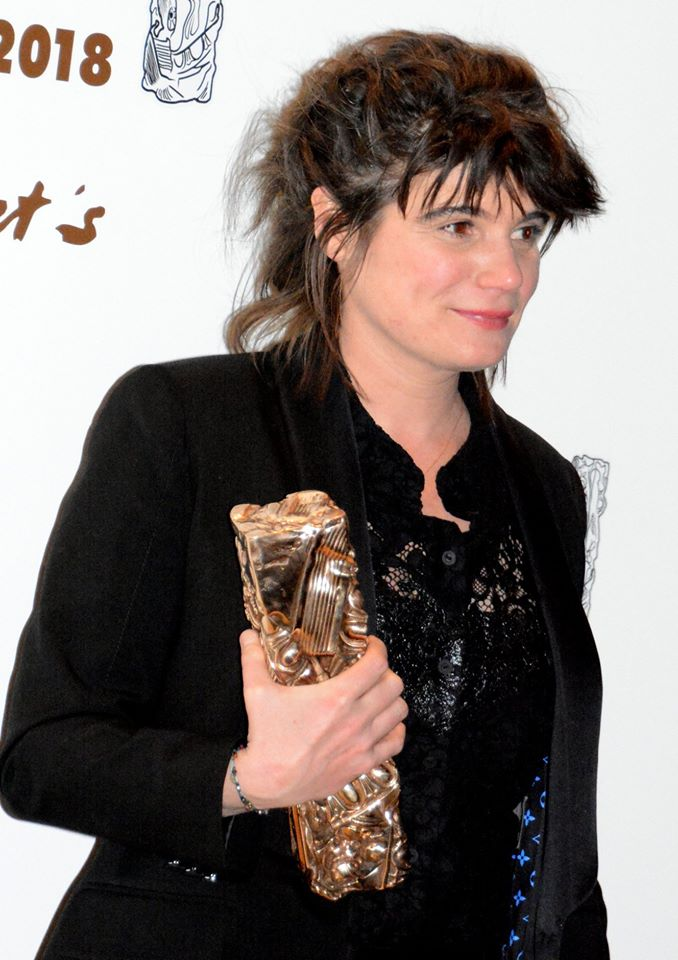
Writer/director Justine Triet (left), co-writer Arthur Harari, and co-producer Marie-Ange Luciani

On 10 July 2021, Variety reported that Les Films Pelléas and Les Films de Pierre would co-produce Justine Triet's fourth feature film, Anatomie d'une chute, co-written by Triet and Arthur Harari, and described as "a Hitchcockian procedural thriller". International sales were handled by mk2 Films.

Triet said that the genesis of Anatomy of a Fall stemmed from her longstanding desire to create another trial film since her 2016 production, In Bed with Victoria. In an interview with Paris Match, she explained: "I really wanted to address the legal question in all its details, to delve into issues of relationships and cohabitation. It was also a pretext to dissect every aspect of their lives." Triet further expressed her fascination with the Amanda Knox case, wherein a young American woman was accused of murdering her roommate, Meredith Kercher, in Italy in 2007.

Triet has also stated that "the fundamental question of the film is the question of reciprocity in the couple" in an interview with The New Yorker, stating that "culturally, women have always been at home, and men have gone out into the world and have had the time to think, to reflect, to have ideas [...] The fact of having a female character who's a creator, who writes books, who is in the position, at last, of taking time to write, means that it's the man who suffers [...] It's something universal and fundamental vis à vis the place of men and women in the family".

Triet wrote Anatomy of a Fall for Sandra Hüller, marking their second collaboration following the 2019 comedy-drama film Sibyl. When Hüller was cast in the role of a German writer who is accused of murdering her French husband in France, Triet told the actress that the language would be an important subject in the film, as the couple did not speak the same language and communicated through English. Hüller wanted to speak French in the film, but Triet rejected the idea. "It was very important to have this sensitivity, this feeling that the husband and the wife don't speak the same language, so they communicate through a third language, English. There was also this idea of what it means to be a foreigner on trial in France. To be tried in a country that is not your own can be tough because you're judged for how you express yourself but as you're not speaking in your mother tongue and there are lots of filters between you and your reality. The fact she is a German who speaks English and tries to speak French that creates lots of masks and clouds the issue, creating more confusion around who she is", Triet told Deadline Hollywood.

Hüller learned to speak French for Anatomy of a Fall, although her character speaks mostly English in the film, because she wanted her character to be able to understand what she was saying in French. Hüller learned French in three or four months. In the screenplay, there is a scene where Sandra speaks a few lines in German with a photographer who is taking photos of her with her son and their dog at the chalet for a photoshoot that would be released in Germany, but the scene was not included in the theatrical cut and Hüller did not speak any German in the film.

On set, Hüller repeatedly asked Triet whether her character was guilty or not, but the director refused to answer. Triet ended up instructing Hüller to play her character as innocent, which Triet later said was "very sneaky", since Hüller did not have an answer. When a journalist asked Triet at the Golden Globe Awards press room in January 2024 if Sandra did kill her husband, Triet replied: "I will tell you in 10 years."

The film was supposed to include a sex scene between Sandra and her lawyer Vincent, but the scene was scrapped thanks to producer Marie-Ange Luciani, who found the scene too "'80s". Hüller agreed with Luciani's decision and said: "Why do people always have to prove they love each other by going to bed with each other? It's so dull!"

The original song meant for the scene where the character Samuel blasts on his stereo on the day he dies was "Jolene", but as the film was unable to acquire the rights, the song "P.I.M.P." was used. Triet described the choice, saying: "I loved the joy and the almost hypnotic quality of [Jolene], and in the trial scenes, there was a whole dissection of the lyrics—certain lyrics that could be interpreted as the husband sending a signal. [P.I.M.P] has lyrics that are pretty misogynistic, obviously. But it also has something quite warm about it, which contrasts hugely with the situation that this character is about to go through: the discovery of her dead husband."

=== Filming ===
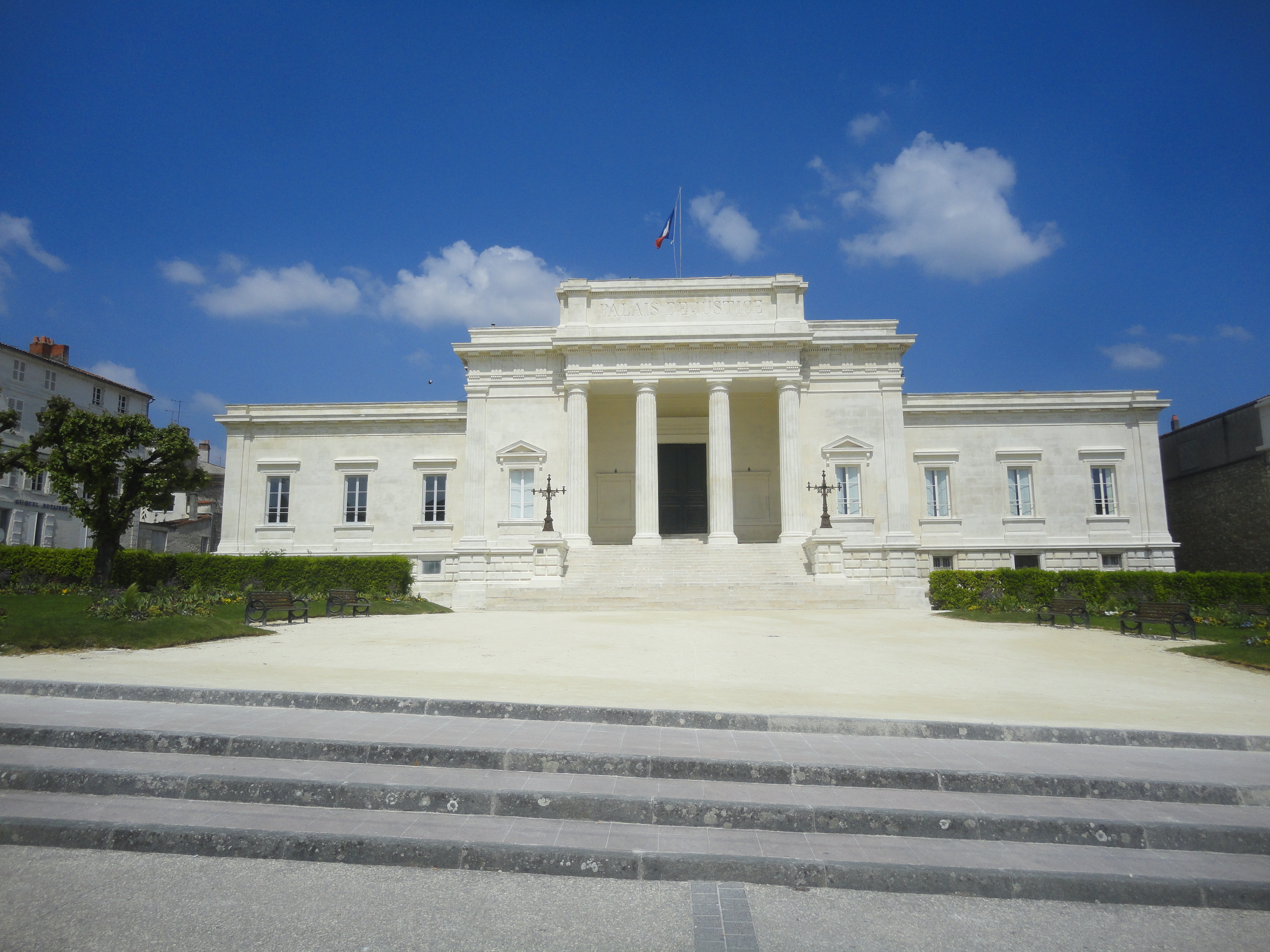
The courthouse at Saintes, where courtroom scenes were filmed

Principal photography began at the end of February 2022 and wrapped up on 13 May 2022. Filming took place mostly in the region of Auvergne-Rhône-Alpes, such as in Maurienne and Villarembert in Savoie, and in Montbonnot-Saint-Martin and Grenoble in Isère. The courtroom scenes were shot in the courthouse of Saintes, Charente-Maritime, where a large allegory of justice was hung as background (the courthouse retained it after filming); some scenes were shot in Paris.

== Release ==
=== Theatrical ===
Anatomy of a Fall had its world premiere at the 76th Cannes Film Festival on 21 May 2023. Le Pacte released it theatrically in France on 23 August 2023. It was also screened at the 27th Lima Film Festival in the Acclaimed section on 13 August 2023. It was also invited at the 28th Busan International Film Festival in the "Icon" section and was screened on 8 October 2023.

In May 2023, Neon acquired the North American distribution rights. Neon released the film in a limited theatrical release in the United States on 13 October 2023 before expanding to more theaters the following week. In September 2023, Lionsgate UK acquired the UK and Ireland distribution rights from Picturehouse Entertainment, and set a release date for 10 November 2023.

=== Home media ===
Anatomy of a Fall was released in France digitally, and on Blu-ray and DVD on 21 December 2023 by Le Pacte, with distribution handled by Warner Bros. Home Entertainment France. On 24 February 2024, it began streaming on MyCanal.

The Criterion Collection released a Blu-ray and DVD edition of the film in the North American market on 28 May 2024.

== Reception ==
=== Critical response ===
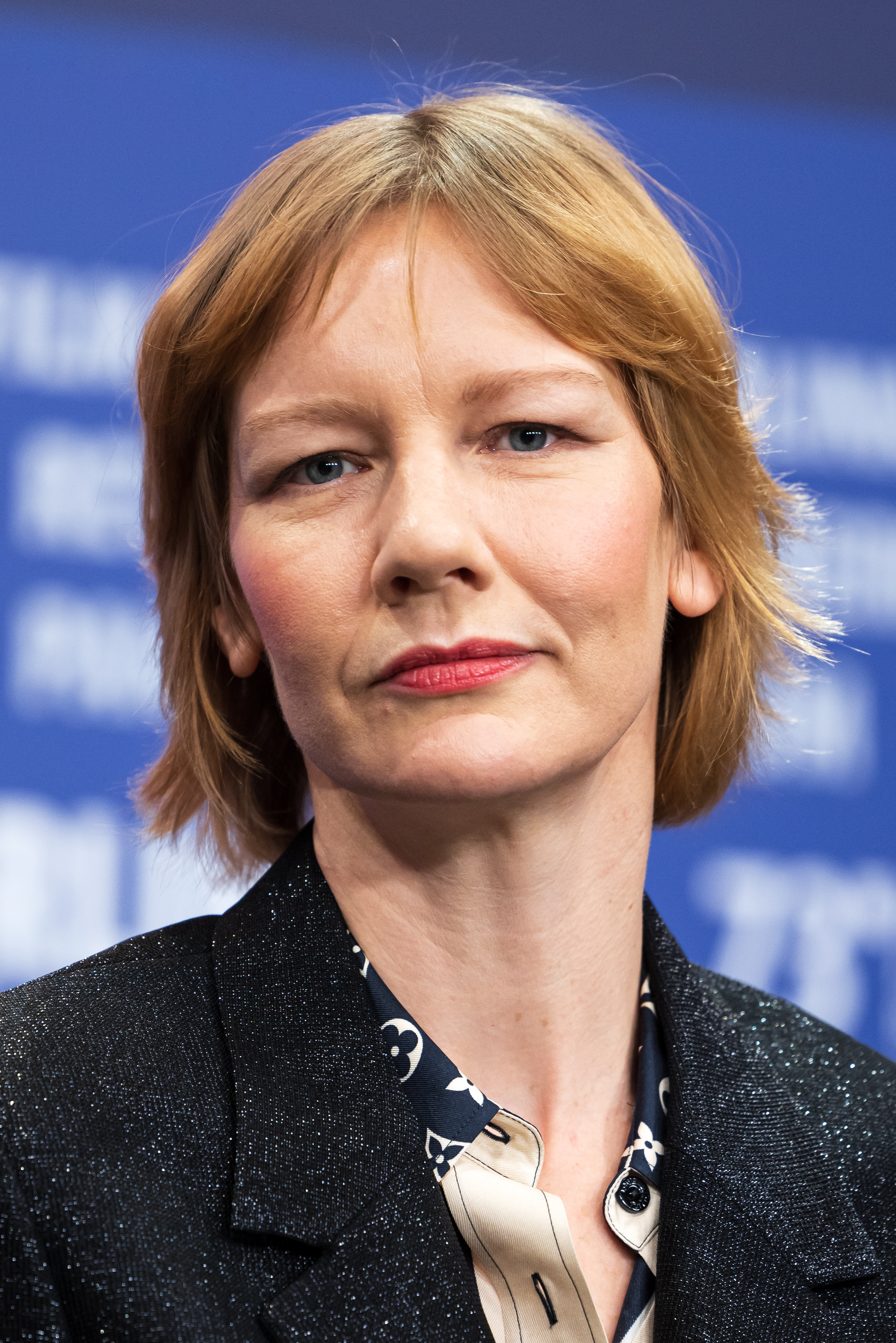
Sandra Hüller garnered critical acclaim for her performance and earned an Academy Award nomination for Best Actress.

The film received critical acclaim. (Note: Attributed to multiple references:) On the review aggregator website Rotten Tomatoes, 96% of 285 critics' reviews are positive, with an average rating of 8.5/10. The website's consensus reads: "A smart, solidly crafted procedural that's anchored in family drama, Anatomy of a Fall finds star Sandra Hüller and director/co-writer Justine Triet operating at peak power." Metacritic, which uses a weighted average, assigned the film a score of 86 out of 100, based on 44 critics, indicating "universal acclaim". AlloCiné gave the film an average rating of 4.4/5, based on 40 French reviews.

Triet and Hüller were praised by critics, and Le Figaro described the film as the "most ambitious and successful film" of Triet's career. Jon Frosch of The Hollywood Reporter wrote: "A director and actress in peak form. Sandra Hüller is brilliant, sensational. An exciting step forward for a filmmaker who seems primed for greater international recognition." Peter Bradshaw of The Guardian gave the film four out of five stars, writing: "Sandra Hüller's calm directness as an actor is what gives the film its texture, substance and emotional force." Damon Wise of Deadline Hollywood wrote: "Sandra Hüller shines. A cerebral smash that might finally bring the [Cannes] Best Actress award that its star, Sandra Hüller, was cruelly denied in 2016. Hüller's screen magnetism cannot be denied."

For David Sims of The Atlantic, the film "works largely because Hüller, a German actress probably best known for her role in Toni Erdmann, gives an extraordinary performance already being tipped for Oscar success". Steve Pond of TheWrap wrote that the film "is straightforward in its style but sophisticated in the way Triet doles out information. It's tense, unbearably so at times, but also subtle and satisfying". Alexandra Heller-Nicholas of Alliance of Women Film Journalists wrote: "Both in front and behind the camera, Anatomy of a Fall is a film made by two women in particular who are simply at the top of their game, and neither Hüller nor Triet show any signs of slowing down."

Raphael Abraham of Financial Times gave the film four out of five stars, writing: "Triet builds a taut did-she-do-it tension while also working in discomfiting questions about marital power dynamics and how much an artist's work really reveals about their character." Abraham also added that Hüller deserved a Cannes Best Actress prize for her performance. Candice Frederick of the HuffPost wrote: "Through vivid flashbacks and meticulous courtroom interrogation, Triet masterfully turns our attention from potential crime-solving to the inner workings of two imperfect people and one complicated marriage. It's absolutely riveting."

Peter Debruge of Variety called the film "thought-provoking", "a kind of Gone Girl in reverse", and an "uncommonly mature film through all its layers, seeing rarely expressed truths about 21st-century relationships in its trajectory". Conversely, Richard Brody of The New Yorker was critical, writing: "Anatomy of a Fall is prestige cinema as (an) airport novel" and that "the showcasing and enshrining of mediocre movies as masterworks poses as great a danger."

Anatomy of a Fall was ranked third on Cahiers du Cinéma's top 10 films of 2023 list. Scott Phillips of Forbes listed the film as #9 on his "Best Films of 2023" list. Rolling Stone's David Fear ranked the film as #7 on his list of the "20 Best Movies of 2023". Many filmmakers and actors praised the film, including Phạm Thiên Ân, Allison Anders, Maggie Betts, Justin Chon, Chloe Domont, Robert Eggers, Kitty Green, Reinaldo Marcus Green, Bill Hader, Andrew Haigh, Chad Hartigan, Don Hertzfeldt, Zoe Lister-Jones, Rachel Morrison, Christian Petzold, James Ponsoldt and Lulu Wang.

In June 2025, IndieWire ranked the film at number 66 on its list of "The 100 Best Movies of the 2020s (So Far)." In 2025, the film ranked number 26 on The New York Times' list of "The 100 Best Movies of the 21st Century" and number 80 on the "Readers' Choice" edition of the list.

=== Box office ===
As of 22 September 2026, Anatomy of a Fall has grossed $5.1 million in the United States and Canada, and $43.8 million in other territories, for a worldwide total of $48.8 million. Its largest markets were France ($14.6 million), the US ($5.1 million), Spain ($2.7 million), and Germany ($2.2 million).

The film was released to 379 theaters in France, where it debuted at number two at the box office grossing over $2 million and selling 262,698 tickets, behind Barbie (288,185 tickets) and ahead of Oppenheimer (231,550 tickets). Anatomy of a Fall had the best opening for a Palme d'Or winner since The Class (2008), which sold 358,000 tickets in France during its opening weekend in 2008. In its second weekend, the film remained in second place behind The Equalizer 3 and ahead of Barbie, accumulating 608,913 tickets sold. In its third weekend, the film reached the top spot at the French box office with 191,392 admissions from 738 theaters, accumulating 800,283 tickets sold, and grossing $5.7 million. In its fourth weekend, the film dropped to the fifth spot at the French box office and accumulated 921,308 admissions.

On 23 September 2023, Anatomy of a Fall exceeded 1 million admissions in France one month after its theatrical release, becoming the seventh Palme d'Or winner–and the third French Palme d'Or winner–to cross the 1 million admissions mark in France since 2000. In May 2024, the film exceeded 1.9 million admissions in France after 35 weeks in theaters. In its opening weekend in the United States, the film made $117,000 from five theaters. It made $152,000 in its second weekend from fourteen theaters. Expanding to 262 theaters the following weekend, the film made $634,000, finishing in 11th. During its fourth weekend, the film expanded to 440 theaters and made $600,355 for a total of $2 million.

== Accolades ==
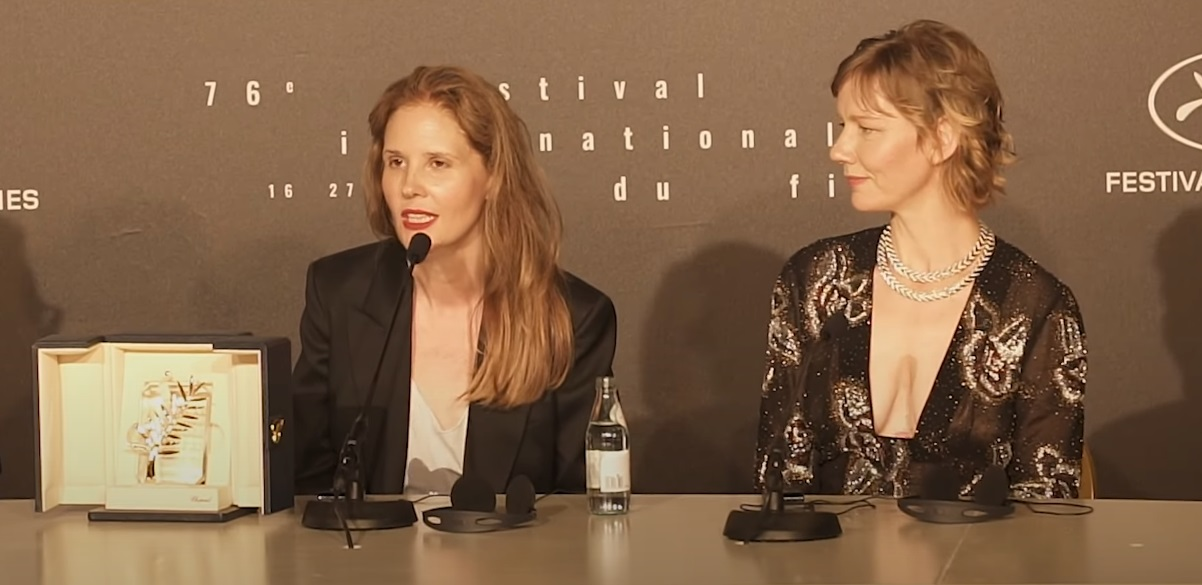
Triet and Hüller with the film's Palme d'Or at the 2023 Cannes Film Festival

On 26 May 2023, Anatomy of a Fall was awarded the Palme d'Or at the 76th Cannes Film Festival, making it the third movie directed by a woman to win the Palme following Julia Ducournau for Titane (2021) and Jane Campion for The Piano (1993). The film won over twenty-one other films in competition for the honour.

On 13 September 2023, Anatomy of a Fall was one of the five films pre-selected by France's Oscar committee to represent the country in the Best International Feature Film category at the 96th Academy Awards. On 21 September 2023, France chose to submit The Taste of Things instead, which sparked controversy, with French insiders claiming that director Justine Triet was being "punished" for criticizing French President Emmanuel Macron's repression of the pension reform protest movement during her acceptance speech at the 2023 Cannes Film Festival. (Note: Multiple references:)

The amount of English language used in Anatomy of a Fall also raised concerns over whether the film would be eligible for the Best International Feature Film category, whose rules state that at least 50% of a film's dialogue must be spoken in a language other than English. According to US distributor Neon, 59% of Anatomy of a Fall is spoken in French, therefore making it eligible. France's Oscar committee choice, The Taste of Things, contains 100% French dialogue. Anatomy of a Fall ended up receiving five nominations for the Academy Awards, while The Taste of Things did not receive the nomination for Best International Feature Film.

Award / Film Festival	Date of ceremony	Category	Recipient(s)	Result	Ref.
Cannes Film Festival	27 May 2023	Palme d'Or	Justine Triet	Won	
Cannes Film Festival	26 May 2023	Queer Palm	Justine Triet	Nominated	
Cannes Film Festival	26 May 2023	Palm Dog Award	Messi	Won	
Sydney Film Festival	18 June 2023	GIO Audience Award for Best International Narrative Feature	Justine Triet	Won	
Brussels International Film Festival	5 July 2023	Grand Prix – International Competition	Justine Triet	Nominated	
Brussels International Film Festival	5 July 2023	International Competition – Audience Award	Justine Triet	Won	
Locarno Film Festival	12 August 2023	Piazza Grande – UBS Audience Award	Justine Triet	Nominated	
Cinéfest Sudbury International Film Festival	28 September 2023	Audience Choice for Best Feature Film	Justine Triet	Runner-up	
Film Festival Cologne	26 October 2023	Cologne Film Prize	Justine Triet	Won	
Festival international du cinéma francophone en Acadie	24 November 2023	Best International Fiction Feature Film	Justine Triet	Won	
Gotham Independent Film Awards	27 November 2023	Best Screenplay	Justine Triet and Arthur Harari	Won	
Gotham Independent Film Awards	27 November 2023	Best International Feature	Anatomy of a Fall	Won	
New York Film Critics Circle	30 November 2023	Best Foreign Language Film	Anatomy of a Fall	Won	
British Independent Film Awards	3 December 2023	Best International Independent Film	Justine Triet, Arthur Harari, Marie-Ange Luciani, and David Thion	Won	
National Board of Review	6 December 2023	Best International Film	Anatomy of a Fall	Won	
Prix Louis-Delluc	6 December 2023	Best Film	Justine Triet	Nominated	
European Film Awards	9 December 2023	Best European Editor	Laurent Sénéchal	Won	
European Film Awards	9 December 2023	Best Film	Anatomy of a Fall	Won	
European Film Awards	9 December 2023	Best European Director	Justine Triet	Won	
European Film Awards	9 December 2023	Best European Screenwriter	Arthur Harari and Justine Triet	Won	
European Film Awards	9 December 2023	Best European Actress	Sandra Hüller	Won	
European Film Awards	9 December 2023	University Film Award	Anatomy of a Fall	Won	
Washington D.C. Area Film Critics Association	9 December 2023	Best Foreign Language Film	Anatomy of a Fall	Won	
Washington D.C. Area Film Critics Association	9 December 2023	Best Original Screenplay	Arthur Harari and Justine Triet	Nominated	
Washington D.C. Area Film Critics Association	9 December 2023	Best Youth Performance	Milo Machado-Graner	Nominated	
Boston Society of Film Critics	10 December 2023	Best Actress	Sandra Hüller	Runner-up (Note: Shared with Emma Stone for Poor Things and Natalie Portman for May December.)	
Los Angeles Film Critics Association	10 December 2023	Best Leading Performance	Sandra Hüller	Won (Note: Also for The Zone of Interest.)	
Los Angeles Film Critics Association	10 December 2023	Best Editing	Laurent Sénéchal	Won	
Los Angeles Film Critics Association	10 December 2023	Best Foreign Language Film	Anatomy of a Fall	Won	
IndieWire Critics Poll	11 December 2023	Best Film	Anatomy of a Fall	7th Place	
IndieWire Critics Poll	11 December 2023	Best Director	Justine Triet	9th Place	
IndieWire Critics Poll	11 December 2023	Best Performance	Sandra Hüller	3rd Place	
IndieWire Critics Poll	11 December 2023	Best Screenplay	Justin Triet and Arthur Harari	3rd Place	
IndieWire Critics Poll	11 December 2023	Best International Film	Anatomy of a Fall	Won	
Chicago Film Critics Association	12 December 2023	Best Foreign Language Film	Anatomy of a Fall	Nominated	
Chicago Film Critics Association	12 December 2023	Best Actress	Sandra Hüller	Nominated	
Chicago Film Critics Association	12 December 2023	Best Original Screenplay	Arthur Harari and Justine Triet	Nominated	
Chicago Film Critics Association	12 December 2023	Most Promising Performer	Milo Machado-Graner	Nominated	
Las Vegas Film Critics Society	13 December 2023	Best International Movie	Anatomy of a Fall	Nominated	
Las Vegas Film Critics Society	13 December 2023	Youth in Film (Male)	Milo Machado-Graner	Nominated	
New York Film Critics Online	15 December 2023	Top 10 Films	Anatomy of a Fall	Won (Note: Presented to multiple films.)	
New York Film Critics Online	15 December 2023	Best Actress	Sandra Hüller	Won	
New York Film Critics Online	15 December 2023	Best Screenplay	Justine Triet and Arthur Harari	Won	
New York Film Critics Online	15 December 2023	Best International Feature	Anatomy of a Fall	Won	
St. Louis Film Critics Association	17 December 2023	Best Film	Anatomy of a Fall	Nominated	
St. Louis Film Critics Association	17 December 2023	Best International Film	Anatomy of a Fall	Won	
St. Louis Film Critics Association	17 December 2023	Best Original Screenplay	Arthur Harari and Justine Triet	Nominated	
Indiana Film Journalists Association	17 December 2023	Best Foreign Language Film	Anatomy of a Fall	Nominated	
North Texas Film Critics Association	18 December 2023	Best Foreign Language Film	Anatomy of a Fall	Won	
Phoenix Film Critics Society	18 December 2023	Best Foreign Language Film	Anatomy of a Fall	Won	
Women Film Critics Circle	18 December 2023	Best Movie by a Woman	Anatomy of a Fall	Nominated	
Women Film Critics Circle	18 December 2023	Best Foreign Film by or About Women	Anatomy of a Fall	Won	
Dallas–Fort Worth Film Critics Association	18 December 2023	Top 10 Films of the Year	Anatomy of a Fall	8th Place	
Dallas–Fort Worth Film Critics Association	18 December 2023	Best Actress	Sandra Hüller	5th Place	
Dallas–Fort Worth Film Critics Association	18 December 2023	Best Foreign Language Film	Anatomy of a Fall	Won	
Dallas–Fort Worth Film Critics Association	18 December 2023	Best Screenplay	Arthur Harari and Justine Triet	Runner-up	
Toronto Film Critics Association	17 December 2023	Best Director	Justine Triet	Runner-up (Note: Shared with Martin Scorsese for Killers of the Flower Moon.)	
Toronto Film Critics Association	17 December 2023	Outstanding Lead Performance	Sandra Hüller	Won	
Toronto Film Critics Association	17 December 2023	Best Original Screenplay	Arthur Harari and Justine Triet	Runner-up (Note: Shared with Celine Song for Past Lives.)	
Toronto Film Critics Association	17 December 2023	Best International Feature	Anatomy of a Fall	Runner-up (Note: Shared with The Zone of Interest.)	
Dublin Film Critics' Circle	19 December 2023	Best Film	Anatomy of a Fall	Second	
Dublin Film Critics' Circle	19 December 2023	Best Director	Justine Triet	Second	
Dublin Film Critics' Circle	19 December 2023	Best Actor	Milo Machado-Graner	8th Place	
Dublin Film Critics' Circle	19 December 2023	Best Actress	Sandra Hüller	4th Place	
Dublin Film Critics' Circle	19 December 2023	Best Screenplay	Justine Triet and Arthur Harari	Won	
San Diego Film Critics Society	19 December 2023	Best Actress	Sandra Hüller	Runner-up	
San Diego Film Critics Society	19 December 2023	Best Original Screenplay	Justine Triet and Arthur Harari	Nominated	
San Diego Film Critics Society	19 December 2023	Best Foreign Language Film	Anatomy of a Fall	Won	
San Diego Film Critics Society	19 December 2023	Best Editing	Laurent Sénéchal	Won	
San Diego Film Critics Society	19 December 2023	Best Youth Performance (For a performer under the age of 18)	Milo Machado-Graner	Runner-up	
Black Film Critics Circle	20 December 2023	Top Ten Films	Anatomy of a Fall	10th Place	
Florida Film Critics Circle	21 December 2023	Best Actress	Sandra Hüller	Runner-up	
Florida Film Critics Circle	21 December 2023	Best Foreign Language Film	Anatomy of a Fall	Won	
Florida Film Critics Circle	21 December 2023	Best Original Screenplay	Justine Triet and Arthur Harari	Nominated	
Alliance of Women Film Journalists	3 January 2024	Best Film	Anatomy of a Fall	Nominated	
Alliance of Women Film Journalists	3 January 2024	Best Director	Justine Triet	Nominated	
Alliance of Women Film Journalists	3 January 2024	Best Woman Director	Justine Triet	Won	
Alliance of Women Film Journalists	3 January 2024	Best Woman Screenwriter	Justine Triet	Nominated	
Alliance of Women Film Journalists	3 January 2024	Best Actress	Sandra Hüller	Nominated	
Alliance of Women Film Journalists	3 January 2024	Most Daring Performance	Sandra Hüller	Nominated	
Alliance of Women Film Journalists	3 January 2024	Best Screenplay, Original	Justine Triet and Arthur Harari	Nominated	
Alliance of Women Film Journalists	3 January 2024	Best Editing	Laurent Sénéchal	Nominated	
Alliance of Women Film Journalists	3 January 2024	Best Non-English-Language Film	Anatomy of a Fall	Nominated	
Georgia Film Critics Association	5 January 2024	Best Actress	Sandra Hüller	Nominated	
Georgia Film Critics Association	5 January 2024	Best International Film	Anatomy of a Fall	Runner-up	
Belgian Film Critics Association	6 January 2024	Grand Prix	Anatomy of a Fall	Nominated	
Astra Film and Creative Arts Awards	6 January 2024	Best International Feature	Anatomy of a Fall	Won	
Astra Film and Creative Arts Awards	6 January 2024	Best International Filmmaker	Justine Triet	Nominated	
Astra Film and Creative Arts Awards	6 January 2024	Best International Actress	Sandra Hüller	Won	
Astra Film and Creative Arts Awards	6 January 2024	Best Original Screenplay	Justine Triet and Arthur Harari	Nominated	
Astra Film and Creative Arts Awards	26 February 2024	Best Editing	Laurent Sénéchal	Nominated	
DiscussingFilm Critic Awards	6 January 2024	Best Picture	Anatomy of a Fall	Nominated	
DiscussingFilm Critic Awards	6 January 2024	Best International Feature	Anatomy of a Fall	Won	
DiscussingFilm Critic Awards	6 January 2024	Best Original Screenplay	Justine Triet and Arthur Harari	Runner-up	
DiscussingFilm Critic Awards	6 January 2024	Best Film Editing	Laurent Sénéchal	Nominated	
DiscussingFilm Critic Awards	6 January 2024	Best Actress	Sandra Hüller	Nominated	
National Society of Film Critics	6 January 2024	Best Actress	Sandra Hüller	Won	
National Society of Film Critics	6 January 2024	Best Film Not in the English Language	Anatomy of a Fall	Runner-up	
Utah Film Critics Association	6 January 2024	Best Non-English Feature	Anatomy of a Fall	Nominated	
Utah Film Critics Association	6 January 2024	Best Original Screenplay	Justine Triet and Arthur Harari	Nominated	
Golden Globe Awards	7 January 2024	Best Motion Picture – Drama	Marie-Ange Luciani and David Thion	Nominated	
Golden Globe Awards	7 January 2024	Best Picture – Non-English Language	Marie-Ange Luciani and David Thion	Won	
Golden Globe Awards	7 January 2024	Best Screenplay	Justine Triet and Arthur Harari	Won	
Golden Globe Awards	7 January 2024	Best Actress in a Motion Picture – Drama	Sandra Hüller	Nominated	
Seattle Film Critics Society	8 January 2024	Best Actress	Sandra Hüller	Nominated	
Seattle Film Critics Society	8 January 2024	Best International Film	Anatomy of a Fall	Nominated	
Seattle Film Critics Society	8 January 2024	Best Youth Performance	Milo Machado-Graner	Won	
San Francisco Bay Area Film Critics Circle	9 January 2024	Best Actress	Sandra Hüller	Nominated	
San Francisco Bay Area Film Critics Circle	9 January 2024	Best Original Screenplay	Justine Triet and Arthur Harari	Nominated	
San Francisco Bay Area Film Critics Circle	9 January 2024	Best International Feature Film	Anatomy of a Fall	Nominated	
San Francisco Bay Area Film Critics Circle	9 January 2024	Best Film Editing	Laurent Sénéchal	Nominated	
Austin Film Critics Association	10 January 2024	Best Actress	Sandra Hüller	Nominated	
Austin Film Critics Association	10 January 2024	Best Original Screenplay	Justine Triet and Arthur Harari	Nominated	
Austin Film Critics Association	10 January 2024	Best International Film	Anatomy of a Fall	Nominated	
Denver Film Critics Society	12 January 2024	Best Non-English Language Feature	Anatomy of a Fall	Won	
Critics' Choice Movie Awards	14 January 2024	Best Actress	Sandra Hüller	Nominated	
Critics' Choice Movie Awards	14 January 2024	Best Foreign Language Film	Anatomy of a Fall	Won	
African-American Film Critics Association	15 January 2024	Top 10 Films of the Year	Anatomy of a Fall	8th Place	
Portland Critics Association	15 January 2024	Best Film Not in the English Language	Anatomy of a Fall	Won	
Portland Critics Association	15 January 2024	Best Actress	Sandra Hüller	Nominated	
Houston Film Critics Society	22 January 2024	Best Foreign Language Feature	Anatomy of a Fall	Nominated	
Lumières Award	22 January 2024	Best Film	Anatomy of a Fall	Won	
Lumières Award	22 January 2024	Best Director	Justine Triet	Nominated	
Lumières Award	22 January 2024	Best Actress	Sandra Hüller	Won	
Lumières Award	22 January 2024	Best Male Revelation	Milo Machado-Graner	Nominated	
Lumières Award	22 January 2024	Best Screenplay	Justine Triet and Arthur Harari	Won	
Lumières Award	22 January 2024	Best Cinematography	Simon Beaufils	Nominated	
Kansas City Film Critics Circle	27 January 2024	Best Actress	Sandra Hüller	Runner-up	
Kansas City Film Critics Circle	27 January 2024	Best Original Screenplay	Justine Triet and Arthur Harari	Won (Note: Tied with Celine Song for Past Lives.)	
Kansas City Film Critics Circle	27 January 2024	Best Foreign Language Film	Anatomy of a Fall	Won	
London Film Critics' Circle	4 February 2024	Film of the Year	Anatomy of a Fall	Nominated	
London Film Critics' Circle	4 February 2024	Actress of the Year	Sandra Hüller	Nominated	
London Film Critics' Circle	4 February 2024	Foreign Language Film of the Year	Anatomy of a Fall	Nominated	
London Film Critics' Circle	4 February 2024	Screenwriter of the Year	Justine Triet and Arthur Harari	Won	
Minnesota Film Critics Alliance	4 February 2024	Best Director	Justine Triet	Nominated	
Minnesota Film Critics Alliance	4 February 2024	Best Screenplay	Justine Triet and Arthur Harari	Nominated	
Paris Film Critics Association Awards	4 February 2024	Best Film	Justine Triet	Won	
Paris Film Critics Association Awards	4 February 2024	Best Original Screenplay	Justine Triet and Arthur Harari	Won	
Paris Film Critics Association Awards	4 February 2024	Best Actress	Sandra Hüller	Won	
Paris Film Critics Association Awards	4 February 2024	Best Editing	Laurent Sénéchal	Won	
Paris Film Critics Association Awards	4 February 2024	Best Director	Justine Triet	Nominated	
Paris Film Critics Association Awards	4 February 2024	Best Male Revelation	Milo Machado-Graner	Nominated	
Paris Film Critics Association Awards	4 February 2024	Best Cinematography	Simon Beaufils	Nominated	
Goya Awards	10 February 2024	Best European Film	Anatomy of a Fall	Won	
Vancouver Film Critics Circle	February 12, 2024	Best Picture	Anatomy of a Fall	Won	
Vancouver Film Critics Circle	February 12, 2024	Best Female Actor	Sandra Hüller	Won	
Vancouver Film Critics Circle	February 12, 2024	Best Screenplay	Justine Triet and Arthur Harari	Nominated	
Vancouver Film Critics Circle	February 12, 2024	Best International Film in a Non-English Language	Anatomy of a Fall	Nominated	
British Academy Film Awards	18 February 2024	Best Film	Marie-Ange Luciani and David Thion	Nominated	
British Academy Film Awards	18 February 2024	Best Film Not in the English Language	Justine Triet, Marie-Ange Luciani, and David Thion	Nominated	
British Academy Film Awards	18 February 2024	Best Director	Justine Triet	Nominated	
British Academy Film Awards	18 February 2024	Best Actress in a Leading Role	Sandra Hüller	Nominated	
British Academy Film Awards	18 February 2024	Best Original Screenplay	Justine Triet and Arthur Harari	Won	
British Academy Film Awards	18 February 2024	Best Casting	Cynthia Arra	Nominated	
British Academy Film Awards	18 February 2024	Best Editing	Laurent Sénéchal	Nominated	
César Awards	12 February 2024	Prix Daniel Toscan du Plantier – Producer of the Year	Marie-Ange Luciani	Won	
César Awards	23 February 2024	Best Film	Justine Triet, Marie-Ange Luciani, and David Thion	Won	
César Awards	23 February 2024	Best Director	Justine Triet	Won	
César Awards	23 February 2024	Best Actress	Sandra Hüller	Won	
César Awards	23 February 2024	Best Supporting Actor	Swann Arlaud	Won	
César Awards	23 February 2024	Best Supporting Actor	Antoine Reinartz	Nominated	
César Awards	23 February 2024	Best Male Revelation	Milo Machado-Graner	Nominated	
César Awards	23 February 2024	Best Original Screenplay	Justine Triet and Arthur Harari	Won	
César Awards	23 February 2024	Best Cinematography	Simon Beaufils	Nominated	
César Awards	23 February 2024	Best Editing	Laurent Sénéchal	Won	
César Awards	23 February 2024	Best Sound	Julien Sicart, Fanny Martin, Jeanne Delplancq, and Olivier Goinard	Nominated	
César Awards	23 February 2024	Best Production Design	Emmanuelle Duplay	Nominated	
Producers Guild of America Awards	25 February 2024	Outstanding Producer of Theatrical Motion Pictures	Anatomy of a Fall	Nominated	
Independent Spirit Awards	25 February 2024	Best International Film	Anatomy of a Fall	Won	
Dorian Awards	26 February 2024	Non-English Language Film of the Year	Anatomy of a Fall	Won	
Dorian Awards	26 February 2024	LGBTQ Non-English Language Film of the Year	Anatomy of a Fall	Won	
Dorian Awards	26 February 2024	Screenplay of the Year	Justine Triet and Arthur Harari	Nominated	
Dorian Awards	26 February 2024	LGBTQ Screenplay of the Year	Justine Triet and Arthur Harari	Nominated	
Dorian Awards	26 February 2024	Film Performance of the Year	Sandra Hüller	Nominated	
American Cinema Editors	3 March 2024	Best Edited Feature Film (Drama, Theatrical)	Laurent Sénéchal	Nominated	
Golden Reel Awards	3 March 2024	Outstanding Achievement in Sound Editing – Foreign Language Feature	Fanny Martin and Jeanne Delplancq	Nominated	
Satellite Awards	3 March 2024	Best Actress in a Motion Picture – Drama	Sandra Hüller	Nominated	
Satellite Awards	3 March 2024	Best Screenplay, Original	Justine Triet and Arthur Harari	Nominated	
Satellite Awards	3 March 2024	Best Motion Picture – International	Anatomy of a Fall	Nominated	
Academy Awards	10 March 2024	Best Picture	Marie-Ange Luciani and David Thion	Nominated	
Academy Awards	10 March 2024	Best Director	Justine Triet	Nominated	
Academy Awards	10 March 2024	Best Actress	Sandra Hüller	Nominated	
Academy Awards	10 March 2024	Best Original Screenplay	Justine Triet and Arthur Harari	Won	
Academy Awards	10 March 2024	Best Film Editing	Laurent Sénéchal	Nominated	
NAACP Image Awards	16 March 2024	Outstanding International Motion Picture	Anatomy of a Fall	Nominated	
David di Donatello	3 May 2024	Best International Film	Anatomy of a Fall	Won	
Gaudí Awards	18 January 2025	Best European Film	Anatomy of a Fall	Won	
Polish Film Awards	10 March 2025	Best European Film	Justine Triet	Won	
