= Samuel Theis =

French film director, actor

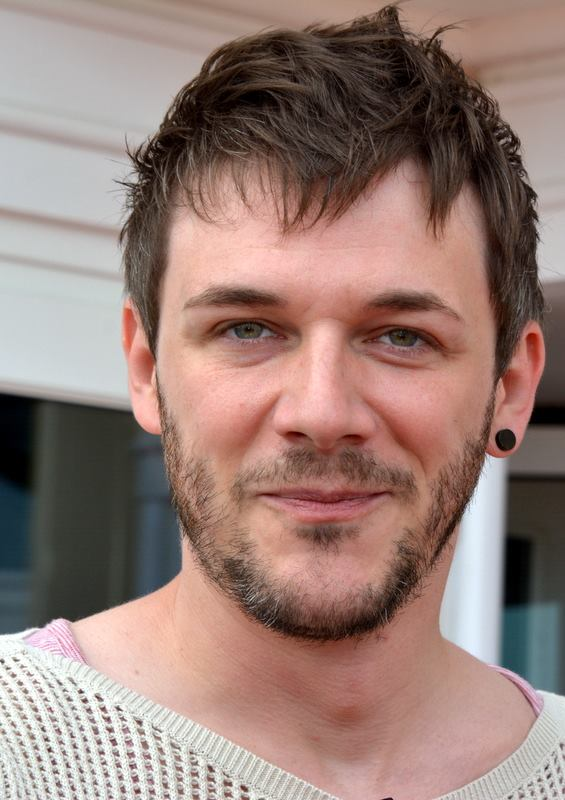
- Samuel Theis at the 2014 Cabourg Film Festival
- Born: Forbach, Lorraine, France
- Occupations: Actor, film director, screenwriter
- Years active: 2007–present

Samuel Theis (French: [samɥɛl tais]; born 1978) is a French actor, film director and screenwriter. He was awarded the Camera d'Or prize along with Claire Burger and Marie Amachoukeli for directing the film Party Girl at the 2014 Cannes Film Festival. Most recently, he played Samuel Maleski in Anatomy of a Fall, which premiered at the 76th Cannes Film Festival on 21 May 2023, where it won the Palme d'Or and the Palm Dog Award.

== Rape allegation ==
In January 2024, it was reported that Theis had been accused of sexually assaulting a crew member during the production of Je le jure (English: I Swear), his third film as director, in summer 2023. The crew member alleged that they were too inebriated to consent, while Theis asserted that the encounter was consensual. It was decided that Theis would continue directing, but remotely (from an adjoining room). In July 2024, after a year of preliminary and judicial investigation, the investigating judge decided not to indict Theis, placing him in the status of an assisted witness. He withdrew from the press tour for the film.

== Filmography ==
=== Actor ===
Year	Title	Role	Notes
2007	Oui, peut-être	Short film	
2008	Versailles: The Dream of a King	Louis XIV	TV movie
2008	Forbach	Samuel	Short film
2008	Musée haut, musée bas	Le critique Paulin	
2009	The Queen and the Cardinal	Beaufort	TV movie
2009	L'odyssée de l'amour	John	TV movie
2010	The Princess of Montpensier	La Valette	
2010	Belle salope	Client Alfa	Short film
2010	Un village français	Kurt	TV series (16 episodes)
2010	Joséphine, ange gardien	Antoine Duroc	TV series (1 Episode)
2011	Chez Maupassant	Le capitaine français	TV series
2012	Une nuit	Arnaud, le dealer au Banana Café	
2013	Manon Lescaut	Le Chevaliers Des Grieux	
2013	Drôle de famille!	Matthieu	
2014	Joel & Jeanne	Joel	Short film
2015	Our Futures	Yann's father	
2023	Anatomy of a Fall	Samuel	

=== Director ===
Year	Title	Notes
2014	Party Girl	Camera d'Or (shared with Claire Burger and Marie Amachoukeli)
2021	Softie (Petite nature)	
