= Claire Burger =

French film director and screenwriter (born 1978)

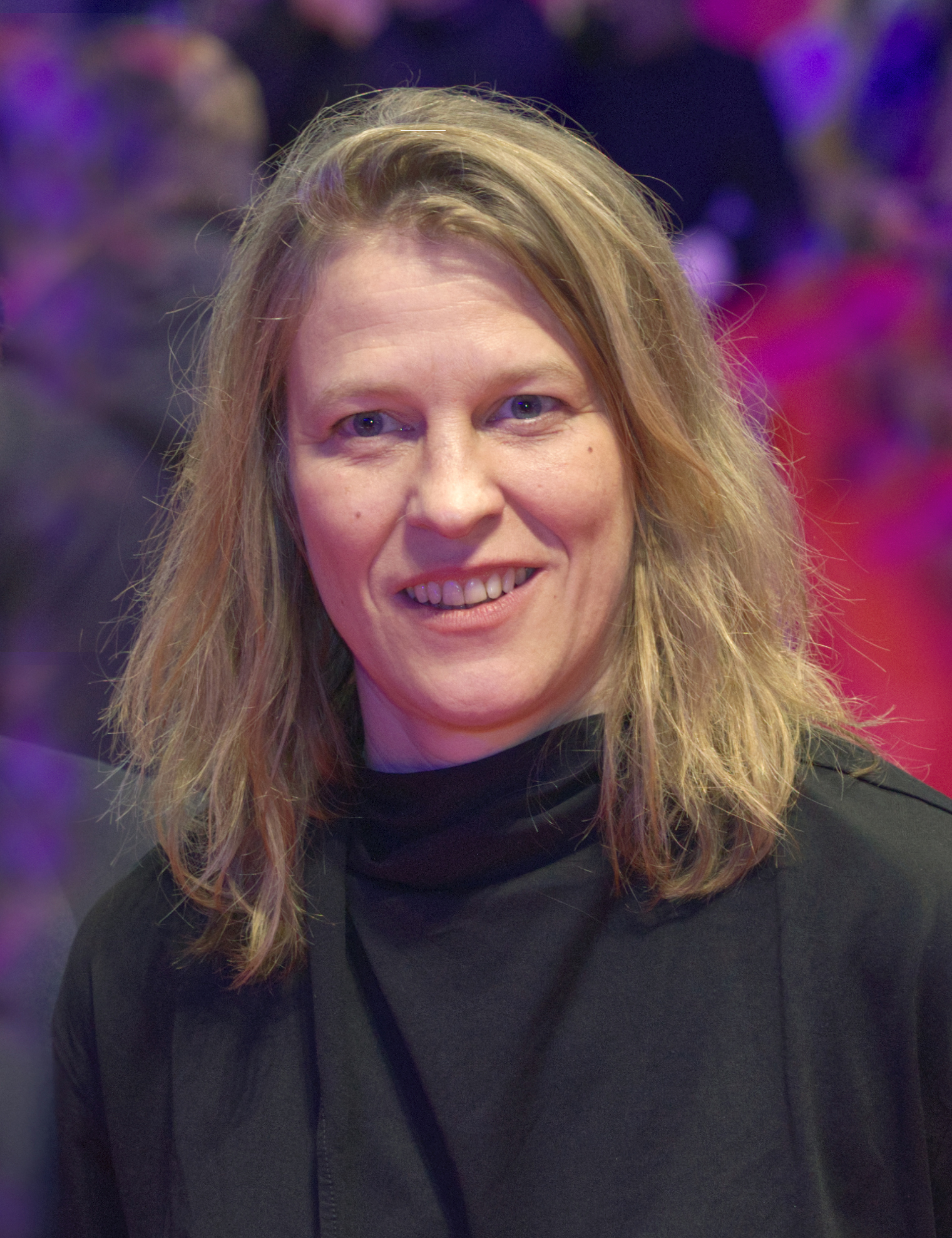
- Burger in 2024
- Born: 1978 (age 47–48); Forbach, Lorraine, France
- Occupations: Film director, screenwriter, film editor, cinematographer
- Years active: 2006–present

Claire Burger (born 1978) is a French film director, film editor and screenwriter. She received the Camera d'Or award for her debut feature film Party Girl at the 2014 Cannes Film Festival.

== Biography ==
After working as a video journalist, Claire Burger trained at La Fémis in the editing department, graduating in 2008.

Her first short film, Forbach, was awarded at the Cannes Film Festival by the Cinéfondation jury chaired by Hou Hsiao-hsien, and won the Grand Prix at the Clermont-Ferrand International Short Film Festival. The film was inspired by the life of the Theis family and featured the real-life members of that family playing themselves.

Burger then co-directed C'est gratuit pour les filles (2009) with Marie Amachoukeli (a 2007 graduate of La Fémis's screenwriting department), which won the César Award for Best Short Film the following year.

In 2014, she shot her debut feature film, Party Girl, in Moselle-Est. The film was co-directed with Marie Amachoukeli and Samuel Theis. All the actors in the film were non-professionals living in Moselle and Saarland. In a similar style to Forbach, the film is freely inspired by the life of Angélique Litzemburger. The film opened the Un Certain Regard section of the 2014 Cannes Film Festival, where it won the Un Certain Regard Prize for Best Ensemble and the Caméra d'Or.

In 2018, she directed her second feature film, Real Love (C'est ça l'amour). Centered on a father raising his two daughters alone after being left by his wife, the film was loosely inspired by the director's own family and received strong critical acclaim. It won an award at the Venice Film Festival in the parallel Venice Days (Giornate degli Autori) section. At the 2018 Les Arcs Film Festival, the jury chaired by Ruben Östlund presented the film with three awards. Its lead actor, Bouli Lanners, was honored with the Magritte Award for Best Actor in February 2020.

In 2020, as a tribute to Henri-Georges Clouzot's unfinished film L'Enfer, she directed the music video for the song "De mon âme à ton âme" by Kompromat featuring Adèle Haenel.

Her third feature film, Foreign Language (Langue étrangère), was shot in 2023 in Strasbourg and Leipzig. The film, which follows a Franco-German language exchange between two adolescent girls, made its world premiere in official competition at the 74th Berlin International Film Festival (Berlinale 2024).

== Personal life ==
In an interview with Radio Nova, Claire Burger stated that she discovered her lesbian identity around the age of 13.

== Filmography ==
=== Director ===
| Year | Title | Notes |
|---|---|---|
| 2008 | Forbach | Short film |
| 2009 | Toute ma vie j'ai rêvé | Short film |
| 2009 | It's Free for Girls | Short film |
| 2013 | Demolition Party | Short film |
| 2014 | Party Girl | Camera d'Or (shared with Marie Amachoukeli and Samuel Theis) |
| 2018 | Real Love | |
| 2024 | Langue Étrangère | It was screened in Competition at the 74th Berlin International Film Festival in February 2024. |

=== Writer ===
| Year | Title | Notes |
|---|---|---|
| 2008 | Forbach | Short film |
| 2009 | Toute ma vie j'ai rêvé | Short film |
| 2009 | It's Free for Girls | Short film |
| 2013 | Demolition Party | Short film |
| 2014 | Party Girl | Prix Jacques Prévert du Scénario |
| 2018 | Real Love | |
| 2024 | Langue Étrangère | |

=== Actress ===
| Year | Title | Role | Notes |
|---|---|---|---|
| 2021 | Petite nature | Claire | |
