= 22nd Lumière Awards =

2017 French film awards ceremony

- Official poster
- Date: 30 January 2017
- Site: Théâtre de la Madeleine, Paris, France
- Hosted by: Pierre Zéni and Laurie Cholewa

Highlights
- Best Film: Elle
- Best Director: Paul Verhoeven
- Best Actor: Jean-Pierre Léaud
- Best Actress: Isabelle Huppert
- Most awards: Elle (3)
- Most nominations: Elle, A Woman's Life, Staying Vertical, The Death of Louis XIV, The Dancer and Frantz (4)

Television coverage
- Network: Ciné+

The 22nd Lumière Awards ceremony, presented by the Académie des Lumières, was held at the Théâtre de la Madeleine in Paris on 30 January 2017 to honour the best in French films of 2016. The nominations were announced on 16 December 2016.

Elle won three awards, including Best Film.

== Winners and nominees ==
Best Film Elle: The Death of Louis XIV; Nocturama; Les Ogres; Staying Vertical; A Woman's Life	Best Director Paul Verhoeven — Elle: Bertrand Bonello — Nocturama; Stéphane Brizé — A Woman's Life; Léa Fehner — Les Ogres; Alain Guiraudie — Staying Vertical; Albert Serra — The Death of Louis XIV
Best Actor Jean-Pierre Léaud — The Death of Louis XIV: Pierre Deladonchamps — Le Fils de Jean; Gérard Depardieu — The End; Nicolas Duvauchelle — A Decent Man; Omar Sy and James Thiérrée — Chocolat; Gaspard Ulliel — It's Only the End of the World	Best Actress Isabelle Huppert — Elle: Judith Chemla — A Woman's Life; Marion Cotillard — From the Land of the Moon; Virginie Efira — In Bed with Victoria; Sidse Babett Knudsen — 150 Milligrams; Soko — The Dancer
Best Male Revelation Damien Bonnard — Staying Vertical: Corentin Fila and Kacey Mottet Klein — Being 17; Finnegan Oldfield — Bang Gang (A Modern Love Story); Toki Pilioko — Mercenary; Sadek — Tour de France; Niels Schneider — Dark Inclusion	Best Female Revelation Oulaya Amamra and Déborah Lukumuena — Divines: Paula Beer — Frantz; Lily-Rose Depp — The Dancer; Manal Issa — Parisienne; Naomi Amarger and Noémie Merlant — Heaven Will Wait; Raph — Slack Bay
Best First Film Divines: Apnea (Apnée); Dark Inclusion; Still Life; The Dancer; Mercenary	Best Screenplay My Life as a Courgette — Céline Sciamma: Elle — David Birke; Les Ogres — Léa Fehner, Catherine Paillé and Brigitte Sy; Heaven Will Wait — Emilie Frèche and Marie-Castille Mention-Schaar; Staying Vertical — Alain Guiraudie; Frantz — François Ozon
Best Cinematography Jonathan Ricquebourg — The Death of Louis XIV: Christophe Beaucarne — From the Land of the Moon; Benoît Debie — The Dancer; Antoine Héberlé — A Woman's Life; Léo Hinstin — Nocturama; Pascal Marti — Frantz	Best Music Ibrahim Maalouf — In the Forests of Siberia: Sophie Hunger — My Life as a Courgette; Laurent Perez del Mar — The Red Turtle; Robin Coudert — Planetarium; Philippe Rombi — Frantz; Gabriel Yared — It's Only the End of the World
Best Documentary My Journey Through French Cinema — Bertrand Tavernier: Latest News from the Cosmos; Merci Patron!; La Sociologue et l'Ourson; Swagger; The Woods Dreams Are Made Of	Best Animated Film My Life as a Courgette: The Girl Without Hands; Louise by the Shore; Long Way North; The Red Turtle
Best French-Language Film Hedi: Belgica; The Unknown Girl; It's Only the End of the World; Mimosas; The First, the Last
Honorary Lumières Thierry Frémaux; Marion Cotillard

== Films with multiple nominations and awards ==
The following films received multiple nominations:

Nominations	Film
4	Elle
4	The Death of Louis XIV
4	Staying Vertical
4	A Woman's Life
4	The Dancer
4	Frantz
3	Nocturama
3	Les Ogres
3	It's Only the End of the World
3	My Life as a Courgette
2
2	From the Land of the Moon
2	Divines
2	Mercenary
2	Heaven Will Wait
2	Dark Inclusion
2	The Red Turtle

The following films received multiple awards:

Awards	Film
3	Elle
2	The Death of Louis XIV
2	Divines
2	My Life as a Courgette

== See also ==
- 42nd César Awards
- 7th Magritte Awards
