= 42nd César Awards =

2017 French film awards ceremony

- Official poster featuring a picture of Marion Cotillard in the 2013 film Blood Ties
- Date: 24 February 2017
- Site: Salle Pleyel, Paris
- Hosted by: Jérôme Commandeur

Highlights
- Best Film: Elle
- Best Actor: Gaspard Ulliel; It's Only the End of the World
- Best Actress: Isabelle Huppert; Elle
- Most awards: Divines (3); It's Only the End of the World (3)
- Most nominations: Elle (11); Frantz (11)

Television coverage
- Network: Canal+

The 42nd César Awards ceremony, presented by the Académie des Arts et Techniques du Cinéma, was held on 24 February 2017, at the Salle Pleyel in Paris to honour the best French films of 2016. Jérôme Commandeur hosted the César Awards ceremony for the first time.

The nominations were announced on 25 January 2017 by Academy president Alain Terzian and awards ceremony host Jérôme Commandeur.

Divines and It's Only the End of the World won three awards each. Other films with multiple awards include Chocolat, My Life as a Courgette and Elle with two, with the latter film winning the Best Film honour.

== Winners and nominees ==
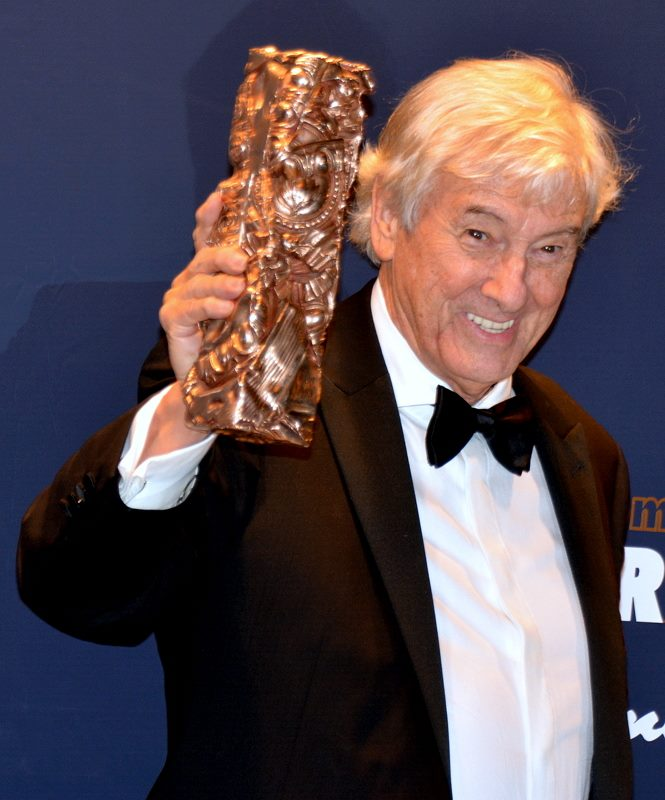
Paul Verhoeven, director of Elle, won Best Film.

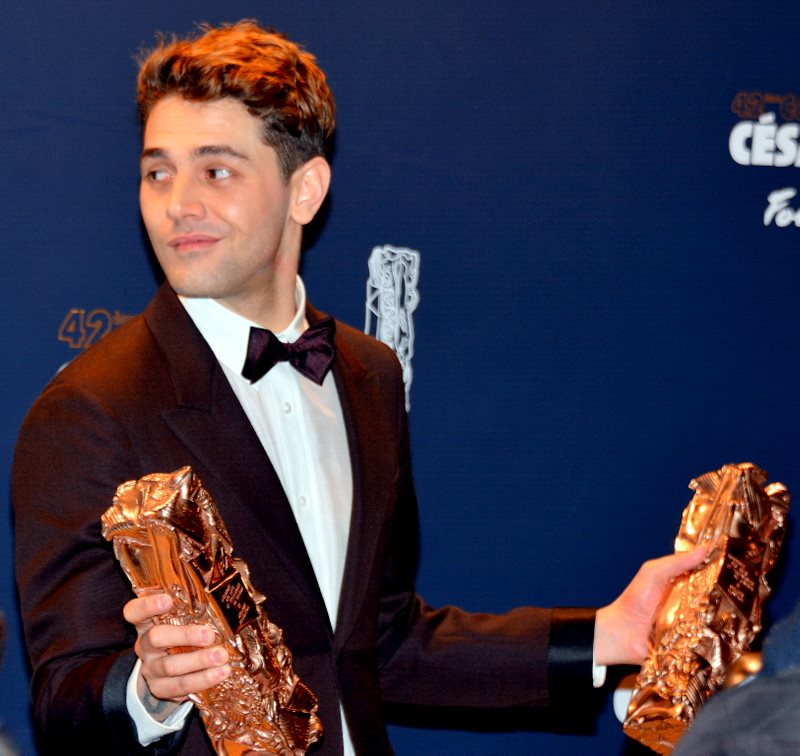
Xavier Dolan, director of It's Only the End of the World, won the César Awards for Best Director and Best Editing.

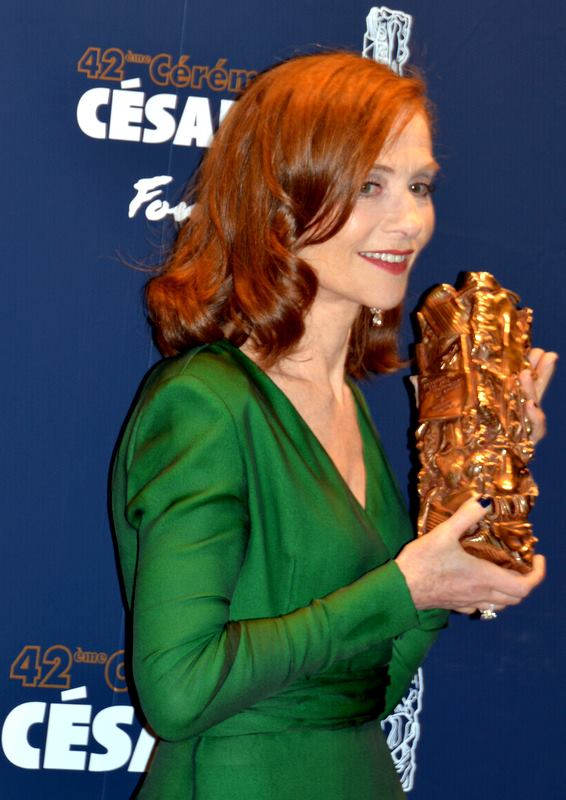
Isabelle Huppert, Best Actress winner.

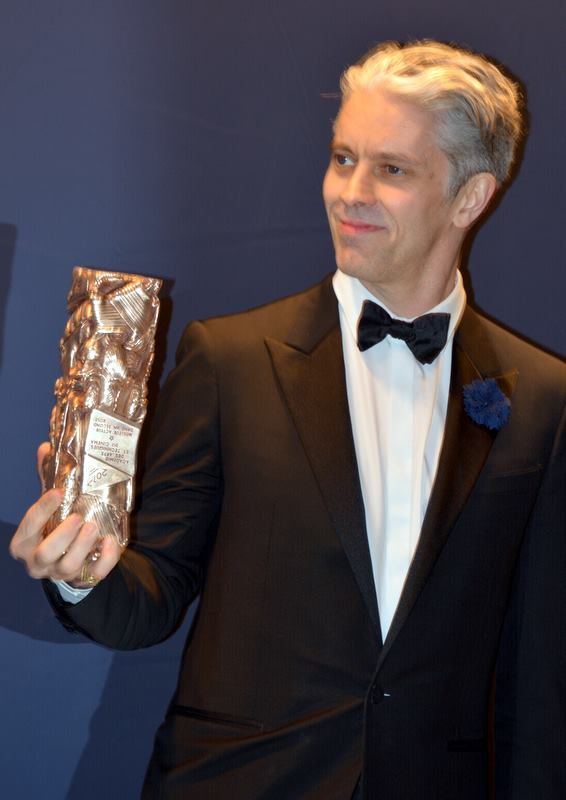
James Thierree, Best Supporting Actor winner.

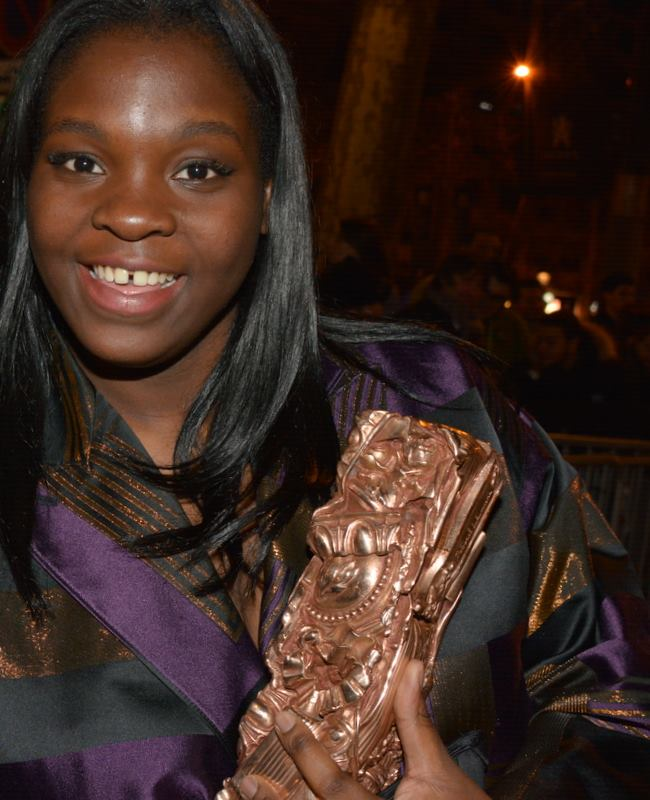
Déborah Lukumuena, Best Supporting Actress winner.

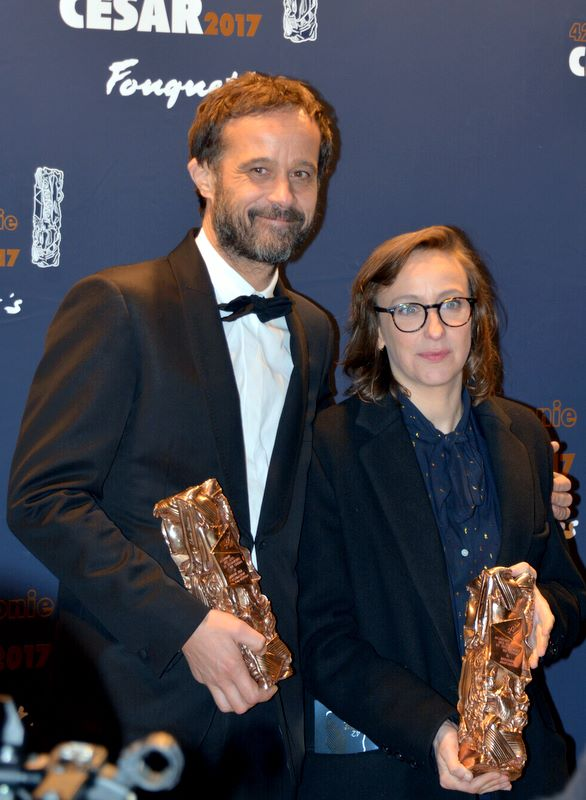
Claude Barras and Céline Sciamma, won the César Awards for Best Animated Feature Film and Best Adaptation for My Life as a Courgette.

Best Film (presented by Pedro Almodóvar) Elle – produced by Saïd Ben Saïd and Michel Merkt, directed by Paul Verhoeven: Divines – produced by Marc-Benoît Créancier, directed by Houda Benyamina; Frantz – produced by Eric Altmayer and Nicolas Altmayer, directed by François Ozon; The Innocents – produced by Eric Altmayer and Nicolas Altmayer, directed by Anne Fontaine; Slack Bay – produced by Jean Bréhat, Rachid Bouchareb and Muriel Merlin, directed by Bruno Dumont; From the Land of the Moon – produced by Alain Attal, directed by Nicole Garcia; In Bed with Victoria – produced by Emmanuel Chaumet, directed by Justine Triet	Best Director (presented by Sylvie Testud and Mathieu Amalric) Xavier Dolan – It's Only the End of the World: Houda Benyamina – Divines; Paul Verhoeven – Elle; François Ozon – Frantz; Anne Fontaine – The Innocents; Bruno Dumont – Slack Bay; Nicole Garcia – From the Land of the Moon
Best Actor (presented by Valérie Lemercier) Gaspard Ulliel – It's Only the End of the World: François Cluzet – Irreplaceable; Pierre Deladonchamps – A Kid; Nicolas Duvauchelle – A Decent Man; Fabrice Luchini – Slack Bay; Pierre Niney – Frantz; Omar Sy – Chocolat	Best Actress (presented by Pierre Richard) Isabelle Huppert – Elle: Judith Chemla – A Woman's Life; Marion Cotillard – From the Land of the Moon; Virginie Efira – In Bed with Victoria; Marina Foïs – Faultless (Irréprochable); Sidse Babett Knudsen – 150 Milligrams; Soko – The Dancer
Best Supporting Actor (presented by Alice Taglioni and Valeria Golino) James Thierrée – Chocolat: Gabriel Arcand – A Kid; Vincent Cassel – It's Only the End of the World; Vincent Lacoste – In Bed with Victoria; Laurent Lafitte – Elle; Melvil Poupaud – In Bed with Victoria	Best Supporting Actress (presented by JoeyStarr and Anna Mouglalis) Déborah Lukumuena – Divines: Nathalie Baye – It's Only the End of the World; Valeria Bruni Tedeschi – Slack Bay; Anne Consigny – Elle; Mélanie Thierry – The Dancer
Most Promising Actor (presented by Alice Isaaz and Rod Paradot) Niels Schneider – Dark Inclusion: Jonas Bloquet – Elle; Damien Bonnard – Staying Vertical; Corentin Fila – Being 17; Kacey Mottet Klein – Being 17	Most Promising Actress (presented by Nicole Garcia) Oulaya Amamra – Divines: Paula Beer – Frantz; Lily-Rose Depp – The Dancer; Noémie Merlant – Heaven Will Wait; Raph – Slack Bay
Best Original Screenplay (presented by André Dussolier) The Aquatic Effect – Sólveig Anspach and Jean-Luc Gaget: Divines – Romain Compingt, Houda Benyamina and Malik Rumeau; The Innocents – Sabrina B. Karine, Alice Vial, Pascal Bonitzer and Anne Fontaine; Slack Bay – Bruno Dumont; In Bed with Victoria – Justine Triet	Best Adaptation (presented by François Cluzet) My Life as a Courgette – Céline Sciamma: Elle – David Birke; 150 Milligrams – Séverine Bosschem and Emmanuelle Bercot; Frantz – François Ozon; From the Land of the Moon – Nicole Garcia and Jacques Fieschi; Heal the Living – Katell Quillévéré and Gilles Taurand
Best First Feature Film (presented by Nathalie Baye) Divines – Houda Benyamina: Cigarettes et chocolat chaud – Sophie Reine; The Dancer – Stéphanie Di Giusto; Dark Inclusion – Arthur Harari; Rosalie Blum – Julien Rappeneau	Best Cinematography (presented by Julie Ferrier) Pascal Marti – Frantz: Stéphane Fontaine – Elle; Caroline Champetier – The Innocents; Guillaume Deffontaines – Slack Bay; Christophe Beaucarne – From the Land of the Moon
Best Editing (presented by Stéfi Celma and Alice Belaïdi) Xavier Dolan – It's Only the End of the World: Loïc Lallemand and Vincent Tricon – Divines; Job ter Burg – Elle; Laure Gardette – Frantz; Simon Jacquet – From the Land of the Moon	Best Sound (presented by Gérard Jugnot) Marc Engels, Fred Demolder, Sylvain Réty and Jean-Paul Hurier – The Odyssey: Brigitte Taillandier, Vincent Guillon and Stéphane Thiébaut – Chocolat; Jean-Paul Mugel, Alexis Place, Cyril Holtz and Damien Lazzerini – Elle; Martin Boissau, Benoît Gargonne and Jean-Paul Hurier – Frantz; Jean-Pierre Duret, Sylvain Malbrant and Jean-Pierre Laforce – From the Land of the Moon
Best Original Music (presented by Grand Corps Malade) Ibrahim Maalouf – In the Forests of Siberia: Gabriel Yared – Chocolat; Anne Dudley – Elle; Philippe Rombi – Frantz; Sophie Hunger – My Life as a Courgette	Best Costume Design (presented by Aïssa Maïga and Franck Gastambide) Anaïs Romand – The Dancer: Pascaline Chavanne – Frantz; Alexandra Charles – Slack Bay; Catherine Leterrier – From the Land of the Moon; Madeline Fontaine – A Woman's Life
Best Production Design (presented by Franck Dubosc) Jérémie D. Lignol – Chocolat: Carlos Conti – The Dancer; Michel Barthélémy – Frantz; Riton Dupire-Clément – Slack Bay; Katia Wyszkop – Planetarium	Best Documentary Film (presented by Ana Girardot and Cédric Klapisch) Merci patron! – François Ruffin: Latest News From the Cosmos – Julie Bertucelli; Fire at Sea – Gianfranco Rosi; Swagger – Olivier Babinet; Journey Through French Cinema – Bertrand Tavernier
Best Animated Feature Film (presented by Marthe Villalonga) My Life as a Courgette – Claude Barras: The Girl Without Hands – Sébastien Laudenbach; The Red Turtle – Michaël Dudok de Wit	Best Animated Short Film (presented by Marthe Villalonga) Celui qui a deux âmes – Fabrice Luang-Vija: Café froid – Stéphanie Lansaque and François Leroy; Journal animé – Donato Sansone; Peripheria – David Coquard-Dassault
Best Short Film (presented by Arnaud Ducret and Alice Pol) Maman(s) – Maïmouna Doucouré; Vers la tendresse – Alice Diop: Après Suzanne – Félix Moati; Au bruit des clochettes – Chabname Zariab; Chasse Royale – Lise Akoka and Romane Gueret	Best Foreign Film (presented by Rossy de Palma) I, Daniel Blake – Ken Loach: Aquarius – Kleber Mendonça Filho; Graduation – Cristian Mungiu; The Unknown Girl – Jean-Pierre and Luc Dardenne; It's Only the End of the World – Xavier Dolan; Manchester by the Sea – Kenneth Lonergan; Toni Erdmann – Maren Ade
Honorary César (presented by Jean Dujardin) George Clooney
Special tribute Jean-Paul Belmondo

== Multiple nominations and awards ==
The following films received multiple nominations:

Nominations	Film
11	Elle
11	Frantz
9	Slack Bay
8	From the Land of the Moon
7	Divines
6	It's Only the End of the World
6	The Dancer
5	Chocolat
5	In Bed with Victoria
4	The Innocents
3	My Life as a Courgette
2	Dark Inclusion
2	Being 17
2	150 Milligrams
2	A Kid
2	A Woman's Life

The following films received multiple awards:

Awards	Film
3	Divines
3	It's Only the End of the World
2	Elle
2	Chocolat
2	My Life as a Courgette

== Viewers ==
The show was followed by 1.9 million viewers. This corresponds to 10.5% of the audience.

== See also ==
- 22nd Lumière Awards
- 7th Magritte Awards
- 29th European Film Awards
- 89th Academy Awards
- 70th British Academy Film Awards
- 62nd David di Donatello
