= Mercenaire =

Mercenaire may refer to:

- Mercenary (2016 film), a drama film directed by Sacha Wolff
- Mercenaire (2024 film), a short drama film directed by Pier-Philippe Chevigny
