= My Life as a Courgette =

2016 film by Claude Barras

- Theatrical release poster
- French: Ma vie de Courgette
- Directed by: Claude Barras
- Screenplay by: Céline Sciamma; Claude Barras; Germano Zullo; Morgan Navarro
- Based on: Autobiographie d'une Courgette by Gilles Paris
- Produced by: Armelle Glorennec; Éric Jacquot; Marc Bonny
- Cinematography: David Toutevoix
- Edited by: Valentin Rotelli
- Music by: Sophie Hunger
- Production companies: Rita Productions; Blue Spirit Productions; Gebeka Films; KNM
- Distributed by: Praesens-Film (Switzerland); Gébéka Films (France)
- Release dates: 15 May 2016 (Cannes); 22 September 2016 (Switzerland); 19 October 2016 (France)
- Running time: 65 minutes
- Countries: Switzerland; France
- Language: French
- Budget: $8 million
- Box office: $10.2 million

My Life as a Courgette (French: Ma vie de Courgette; also titled My Life as a Zucchini in North America and Australia) is a 2016 French-language stop-motion animated comedy-drama film directed by Claude Barras, and co-written by Céline Sciamma. It was screened in the Directors' Fortnight section at the 2016 Cannes Film Festival.

This is the second adaptation of Gilles Paris' 2002 novel Autobiographie d'une Courgette, as there was a French live-action television film adaptation called C'est mieux la vie quand on est grand which aired in 2007 by Luc Béraud.

The film received acclaim from critics, with many praising the film's visual aesthetic, emotional depth, and sympathetic characters. It won Best Animated Film and Best Adapted Screenplay at the 42nd César Awards. At the 89th Academy Awards, it was nominated for the Best Animated Feature Film and was selected as the Swiss entry for the Best Foreign Language Film at the 89th Academy Awards, making the December shortlist.

== Plot ==
Set in Switzerland, Icare lives with his mother, Mama Lala, who has become an alcoholic and physically abusive towards him after Icare's father, Papa Lele, abandoned their family. One day when his mother comes after him in a drunken rage, Icare accidentally pushes her down the stairs when he closes the attic door on her, causing her death. Later on, Icare makes a deposition to Police Officer Raymond. He informs him that he prefers to be called "Courgette" ("Zucchini" in the American English version), his mother's nickname for him. As mementos, he keeps one of his mother's beer cans and a kite he made with a drawing of his father as a superhero.

Raymond brings Courgette to an orphanage. Simon, one of the kids there, initially picks on Courgette and tries to force him to say what happened to his parents. After a fight over the kite, Simon warms up to Courgette and explains that he's the one who knows about all the kids' backgrounds. He then points out the backstories of the other kids, whose parents are either deceased or, as in Simon's case, in trouble with the law. Courgette then tells him about what happened to his own mother.

One day, a new orphaned girl named Camille arrives and Courgette develops a crush on her at first sight. Simon and Courgette sneak a look at her files and find out that she had witnessed her father murdering her mother for cheating on him, and then killing himself. Camille does have a living aunt named Ida, but she is a spiteful (and possibly abusive) woman whose only reason for wanting to gain custody of Camille is for the money she'll get in taking her in. Courgette and Camille start to bond during an overnight vacation at a snow resort, where he refashions his mother's beer can into a toy boat for her.

Courgette grows close to Officer Raymond as he regularly sends letters and drawings to him. Raymond plans to spend a holiday with Courgette, on the same weekend that Camille is supposed to spend with Ida. Camille stows away in Raymond's car instead. Raymond reluctantly agrees to bring both kids to the outing. The three have fun at an amusement park and return to Raymond's house, where Raymond reveals that he has a son that never talks to him. Ida suddenly appears and angrily takes Camille away.

A few weeks later comes the custody meeting with the judge. There, Camille reveals that Simon had snuck an MP3 player into her toy boat that she's used to record Ida insulting Camille's deceased mother and yelling at her. Ida loses her temper at Camille right in front of the judge, destroying her bid for custody.

Raymond finally decides to take both Courgette and Camille in as foster children. Simon is initially angry, but he ultimately coaxes a reluctant Courgette to go with Raymond. Raymond takes some group photos of the kids before he leaves with Courgette and Camille. While living with Raymond, Courgette still writes letters to the kids at the orphanage, maintaining that he, Camille and Raymond are people that still love them all. Courgette now keeps a group photo of the kids on his kite.

== Cast ==
Character	French	English
Courgette	Gaspard Schlatter	Erick Abbate
Camille	Sixtine Murat	Ness Krell
Simon	Paulin Jaccoud	Romy Beckman
Raymond	Michel Vuillermoz	Nick Offerman
Ahmed	Raul Ribera	Barry Mitchell
Alice	Estelle Hennard	Clara Young
Jujube	Elliot Sanchez	Finn Robbins
Béatrice	Lou Wick	Olivia Bucknor
Tante Ida	Brigitte Rosset	Amy Sedaris
Courgette's Mother	Natacha Koutchoumov	Susanne Blakeslee
Mme Papineau	Monica Budde	Susanne Blakeslee
Mr. Paul	Adrien Barazzone	Will Forte
Rosy	Véronique Montel	Elliot Page (Note: Credited as Ellen Page. Page came out as transgender in 2020.)

== Film concept ==
Director Claude Barras, a former student of the Émile-Cohl school, chose to adapt the novel by Gilles Paris, Autobiography of a Zucchini, on the advice of his friend Cédric Louis, with whom he co-directed several short films.

The director worked for nearly two years to establish the foundations of the film, using the films of Tim Burton and the puppets of Jiří Trnka as models. Keen to free the narrative from its episodic structure, he benefited from the help of Céline Sciamma, a great enthusiast of animated cinema, who had been contacted by the producers to work on the screenplay.

The film was initially to be produced by Robert Boner, producer of one of the first Swiss feature-length animated films, Max and Co, but he had to withdraw. He was replaced by Max Karli and Pauline Gygax from Rita Productions with a projected budget of 5.3 million euros. Since this was the first feature-length animated film for both the director and his producers, the production faced some hiccups (related, notably, to the transition to a large-scale production system), resulting in a budget overrun of more than one million euros, covered through the intervention of Swiss producer Michel Merkt.

The film employs the stop-motion animation technique, which involves filming statuettes frame by frame, moving them slightly between each shot. It was filmed at the studios of Pôle Pixel in Villeurbanne. Thirty seconds of animation are completed each day. Until April 2015, nine animators specialized in this animation technique worked simultaneously on 15 sets.

== Exhibition ==
From November 2016 to April 2017, the Miniature and Cinema Museum in Lyon hosted an exhibition of the film's sets and figurines. From May 2017 to August 2017, the Carouge Museum held an exhibition titled My Life as a Zucchini: We Tell You Everything!.

== Reception ==
=== Critical response ===
My Life as a Zucchini received an excellent reception in the French media during its premiere at the Annecy festival in spring 2016, followed by its theatrical release in October. The site Allociné awarded the film an average rating of 4.5/5 based on 30 reviews published in print or online media.

The film has a rating of 99% on Rotten Tomatoes, based on 137 reviews, with an average rating of 8.20/10. The site's critical consensus reads, "My Life as a Zucchini's silly title and adorable characters belie a sober story whose colorful visuals delight the senses even as it braves dark emotional depths." On Metacritic, the film received a rating of 85 out of 100, based on 28 critics, indicating "universal acclaim".

In France, on 19 October 2016, My Life as a Zucchini was released the same day as Trolls, a big-budget American animation film from DreamWorks, and the comedy Brice 3. My Life as a Zucchini was screened in 215 theaters and attracted just over 190200 viewers in its opening week, followed by 146160 viewers in the second week, 68400 viewers in the third week, and 64340 viewers in the fourth week, totaling approximately 468940 entries after one month of release. The number of viewers per week decreased significantly between the second and third weeks but remained steady in the fourth week before gradually declining in the following weeks. However, the film was shown in an increasing number of theaters, reaching 269 in the fourth week and then 357 in the fifth week before declining slightly. The eighth and ninth weeks of the film's release saw an increase in the number of entries: after attracting around 23880 viewers in the seventh week, the film had 32260 viewers in the eighth week and 53772 viewers in the ninth week, aided by an expanded release to more than 300 theatres across the country. The film surpassed 600000 entries after two months in theaters and then exceeded 650000 entries after nine weeks.

=== Accolades ===
Award	Date of ceremony	Category	Recipient(s)	Result	Ref.
Academy Awards	26 February 2017	Best Animated Feature	Claude Barras; Max Karli	Nominated	
Annie Awards	4 February 2017	Best Animated Feature — Independent	Rita Productions; Blue Spirit Productions; Gebeka Films; KNM	Nominated	
Annie Awards	4 February 2017	Outstanding Achievement, Directing in an Animated Feature Production	Claude Barras	Nominated	
Annie Awards	4 February 2017	Outstanding Achievement, Writing in an Animated Feature Production	Céline Sciamma	Nominated	
Annecy International Animated Film Festival	18 June 2016	Audience Award	Claude Barras; Rita Productions; Blue Spirit Animation; Gébéka Films	Won	
Annecy International Animated Film Festival	18 June 2016	Cristal Award for Best Feature	Claude Barras; Rita Productions; Blue Spirit Animation; Gébéka Films	Won	
British Academy Film Awards	18 February 2018	Best Animated Film	Claude Barras; Max Karli	Nominated	
Cannes Film Festival	22 May 2016	Caméra d'Or	Claude Barras	Nominated	
César Award	24 February 2017	Best Adapted Screenplay	Céline Sciamma	Won	
César Award	24 February 2017	Best Animated Film	Claude Barras	Won	
César Award	24 February 2017	Best Original Music	Sophie Hunger	Nominated	
European Film Awards	10 December 2016	Best Animated Feature Film	Claude Barras; Kim Keukeleire; Armelle Glorennec; Éric Jacquot; Marc Bonny	Won	
European Parliament LUX Prize	23 November 2016	Lux Prize	Claude Barras	Nominated	
Golden Globe Awards	8 January 2017	Best Animated Feature Film	Claude Barras	Nominated	
Golden Tomato Awards	3 January 2018	Best Animated Film	My Life as a Courgette	3rd Place	
Lumière Awards	30 January 2017	Best Screenplay	Céline Sciamma	Won	
Lumière Awards	30 January 2017	Best Animated Film	Claude Barras	Won	
Lumière Awards	30 January 2017	Best Music	Sophie Hunger	Nominated	
Satellite Awards	18 December 2016	Best Animated or Mixed Media Feature	My Life as a Zucchini	Won	
Swiss Film Award	24 March 2017	Best Fiction Film(Bester Spielfilm)	Claude Barras; Rita Productions	Won	
Swiss Film Award	24 March 2017	Best Music (Beste Filmmusik)	Sophie Hunger	Won	
Swiss Film Award	24 March 2017	Best Editing (Beste Montage)	Valentin Rotelli	Nominated	
Swiss Film Award	24 March 2017	Special Academy Award (For Casting)	Marie-Eve Hildbrand	Won	
Tokyo Anime Award	17 March 2017	Grand Prize (Feature Film)	Claude Barras	Nominated	
Tokyo Anime Award	17 March 2017	Award of Excellence (Feature Film)	Claude Barras	Won	
UK Film Festival	27 November 2016	Best Animated Feature	Claude Barras	Won	

== See also ==
- List of submissions to the 89th Academy Awards for Best Foreign Language Film
- List of Swiss submissions for the Academy Award for Best Foreign Language Film
