= Staying Vertical =

- Theatrical release poster
- Rester vertical
- Directed by: Alain Guiraudie
- Written by: Alain Guiraudie
- Produced by: Sylvie Pialat; Benoît Quainon
- Starring: Damien Bonnard; India Hair; Raphaël Thiéry
- Cinematography: Claire Mathon
- Edited by: Jean-Christophe Hym
- Production company: Les Films du Worso
- Distributed by: Les Films du Losange
- Release dates: 12 May 2016 (Cannes); 24 August 2016 (France)
- Running time: 100 minutes
- Country: France
- Language: French
- Budget: $4 million
- Box office: $456.000

Staying Vertical (French: Rester vertical) is a 2016 French drama film written and directed by Alain Guiraudie. The story follows a filmmaker who has to raise a child (whom he had with a shepherdess) by himself while seeking inspiration for his new film. It was selected to compete for the Palme d'Or at the 2016 Cannes Film Festival.

== Cast ==
- Damien Bonnard as Léo
- India Hair as Marie
- Raphaël Thiéry as Jean-Louis
- Christian Bouillette as Marcel
- Basile Meilleurat as Yoan
- Laure Calamy as Doctor Mirande

== Reception ==
Review aggregation website Rotten Tomatoes reported an approval rating of 65%, based on 23 reviews, with an average score of 6.2/10. On Metacritic, the film has a score of 65 out of 100, based on 17 critics, indicating "generally favorable reviews".

== Accolades ==
Award / Film Festival	Category	Recipients and nominees	Result
Cannes Film Festival	Palme d'Or		Nominated
Cannes Film Festival	Queer Palm		Nominated
César Awards	Most Promising Actor	Damien Bonnard	Nominated
Louis Delluc Prize	Best Film		Nominated
Lumière Awards	Best Film		Nominated
Lumière Awards	Best Director	Alain Guiraudie	Nominated
Lumière Awards	Best Male Revelation	Damien Bonnard	Won
Lumière Awards	Best Screenplay	Alain Guiraudie	Nominated
