= Heaven Will Wait =

2016 French drama film

- Film poster
- Directed by: Marie-Castille Mention-Schaar
- Written by: Emilie Frèche; Marie-Castille Mention-Schaar
- Produced by: Marie-Castille Mention-Schaar
- Starring: Noémie Merlant; Naomi Amarger; Sandrine Bonnaire; Clotilde Courau; Zinedine Soualem
- Cinematography: Myriam Vinocour
- Edited by: Benoît Quinon
- Distributed by: UGC Distribution
- Release dates: 8 August 2016 (Locarno); 5 October 2016 (France)
- Running time: 104 minutes
- Country: France
- Language: French
- Box office: $2 million

Heaven Will Wait (French: Le Ciel attendra) is a 2016 French drama film directed by Marie-Castille Mention-Schaar. It was selected to be screened in the Contemporary World Cinema section at the 2016 Toronto International Film Festival.

== Cast ==
- Noémie Merlant as Sonia Bouzaria
- Naomi Amarger as Mélanie Thenot
- Sandrine Bonnaire as Catherine
- Clotilde Courau as Sylvie
- Zinedine Soualem as Samir
- Dounia Bouzar as Herself
- Ariane Ascaride
- Yvan Attal

== Reception ==
Allan Hunter of Screen Daily wrote that while the film "lack[s] subtlety in places, it still successfully evokes the human heartbreak beneath the news headlines."

== Accolades ==
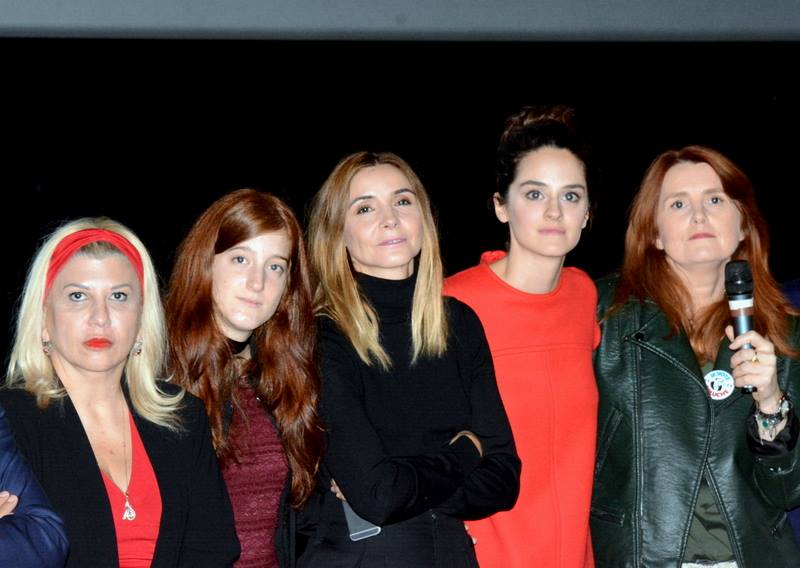
Cast and director at premiere

Award / Film Festival	Category	Recipients and nominees	Result
César Awards	Most Promising Actress	Noémie Merlant	Nominated
Lumière Awards	Best Female Revelation	Naomi Amarger	Nominated
Lumière Awards	Best Female Revelation	Noémie Merlant	Nominated
Lumière Awards	Best Screenplay	Emilie Frèche and Marie-Castille Mention-Schaar	Nominated
