= In Bed with Victoria =

2016 film by Justine Triet

- Theatrical release poster
- French: Victoria
- Directed by: Justine Triet
- Written by: Justine Triet
- Produced by: Emmanuel Chaumet
- Starring: Virginie Efira; Vincent Lacoste; Melvil Poupaud; Laurent Poitrenaux; Laure Calamy; Alice Daquet
- Cinematography: Simon Beaufils
- Edited by: Laurent Sénéchal
- Production companies: Ecce Films; France 2 Cinéma
- Distributed by: Le Pacte
- Release dates: 12 May 2016 (Cannes); 14 September 2016 (France)
- Running time: 97 minutes
- Country: France
- Language: French
- Budget: €4 million
- Box office: $5 million

In Bed with Victoria (French: Victoria) is a 2016 French romantic comedy-drama film written and directed by Justine Triet. It stars Virginie Efira, Vincent Lacoste, Melvil Poupaud, Laurent Poitrenaux, Laure Calamy and Alice Daquet. The film follows the titular Victoria, an overworked lawyer and divorced mother of two dealing with a series of crises in her personal and professional life, including a close friend who is accused of attempted murder and a former client whom she hires as her live-in assistant.

The film had its world premiere in the Critics' Week section of the 2016 Cannes Film Festival where the lead animal actor, Jacques, won the Grand Jury Prize, the Palm Dog Award. It received five nominations at the 42nd César Awards. Efira received a Magritte Award for Best Actress at the 7th Magritte Awards for her performance in the film.

== Plot ==
Victoria Spick is a criminal defense lawyer and divorced mother of two young daughters who is constantly on the verge of a nervous breakdown. While attending the wedding of friends Axel and Suzanna, Victoria's close friend Vincent Kossarski drunkenly confides in her that he wants to break up with his lover Eve Scorr. Victoria then encounters a previous client of hers, young Samuel "Sam" Mallet, a former drug dealer who tells her that he is now looking for a job or an apprenticeship. Later that night, Eve is found having been stabbed in the stomach, and Vincent is charged with attempted murder.

The next morning at the police station, Vincent maintains his innocence, claiming that Eve inflicted the wound on herself. He asks Victoria to be his lawyer, and she reluctantly agrees, though she feels that their friendship might create a conflict of interest. Sam convinces Victoria to hire him as her live-in assistant and apprentice for a trial period, offering to babysit her daughters and take care of the household. Victoria tries to alleviate her persistent sexual dissatisfaction with a series of unfulfilling one-night stands, and visits to a psychiatrist and a fortune teller also prove fruitless.

Sam discovers that Victoria's ex-husband David runs a blog exposing thinly disguised details of her personal and professional life, including sexual relations with judges. Victoria confronts David, saying his blog could damage her reputation and that it contains confidential information, but he insists his blog is autofiction. Outside her apartment building, Victoria is approached by Suzanna, a witness in Vincent's case, who accuses him of being a psychopath and a misogynist, but Victoria insists she cannot discuss the case with a witness. As a result, Victoria is suspended from practicing law for six months.

After suffering a nervous breakdown, Victoria fires Sam and is informed by the lawyer who took over Vincent's case that Vincent and Eve have reconciled. Following a six-month period of self-isolation at home, Victoria calls Sam and asks him to return, whereupon they have sex. The next day, Vincent tells Victoria that he is now being accused of harassment by an ex-girlfriend, Leslie Chevalier, after she has learned of his impending trial. Victoria agrees to take on the case, with only 15 days to prepare. Meanwhile, Victoria sues David for defamation.

In court, Leslie testifies that Vincent became violent after she broke up with him, refusing to accept her decision. Eve then takes the stand, claiming that Vincent snatched her panties violently at the wedding, while he maintains that she did not wear any panties. Eve's pet Dalmatian and a chimpanzee, which were both present at the wedding, are also called as witnesses. A photo taken during the wedding shows that Eve was not wearing any panties, and Victoria presents three possibilites: Vincent snatched Eve's panties an hour before the event; she handed over the panties herself; or she lied.

Victoria rejects a real relationship with Sam, as they are now working more closely together professionally. Feeling increasingly invisible to Victoria, Sam leaves her the day before the closing arguments in Vincent's case. The next day in court, Victoria secures Vincent's acquittal. Her own case is partially successful: While David is ordered to change the names of his blog characters and pay Victoria €90 in damages, he is allowed to continue running his blog and pursue a film adaptation of its content. That night, Victoria encounters Sam and tells him that she has realized she loves him. They kiss and embrace.

== Cast ==
- Virginie Efira as Victoria Spick
- Vincent Lacoste as Samuel
- Melvil Poupaud as Vincent
- Laurent Poitrenaux as David
- Laure Calamy as Christelle
- Alice Daquet as Eve
- Julie Moulier as the judge
- Elsa Wolliaston as the clairvoyant
- Sophie Fillières as Sophie
- Pierre Maillet as the psychiatrist
- Sabrina Seyvecou as Suzanna
- Emmanuelle Lanfray as Axel

== Release ==
In Bed with Victoria had its world premiere opening the Critics' Week section of the Cannes Film Festival on 12 May 2016. It was released in France on 14 September 2016 by Le Pacte.

== Reception ==
=== Box office ===
In Bed with Victoria grossed $5 million worldwide, against a production budget of €4 million.

=== Critical response ===
On the review aggregator website Rotten Tomatoes, the film holds an approval rating of 85% based on 13 reviews, with an average rating of 6.3/10. Metacritic, which uses a weighted average, assigned the film a score of 58 out of 100, based on 5 critics, indicating "mixed or average" reviews.

=== Accolades ===
Award	Year	Category	Recipient(s)	Result	Ref.
César Awards	2017	Best Film	Justine Triet and Emmanuel Chaumet	Nominated	
César Awards	2017	Best Original Screenplay	Justine Triet	Nominated	
César Awards	2017	Best Actress	Virginie Efira	Nominated	
César Awards	2017	Best Supporting Actor	Vincent Lacoste	Nominated	
César Awards	2017	Best Supporting Actor	Melvil Poupaud	Nominated	
Lumière Awards	2017	Best Actress	Virginie Efira	Nominated	
Magritte Awards	2017	Best Actress	Virginie Efira	Won	
Trophées du Film français	2017	Best Director/Producer duo	Justine Triet and Emmanuel Chaumet	Won	
