= Continental Drift (South) =

- Promotional release poster
- French: La dérive des continents (au sud)
- Directed by: Lionel Baier
- Written by: Lionel Baier; Laurent Larivière
- Produced by: Pauline Gygax; Max Karli
- Starring: Isabelle Carré; Théodore Pellerin
- Cinematography: Josée Deshaies
- Edited by: Pauline Gaillard
- Production company: Bandita Films
- Release date: May 2022 (Cannes)
- Running time: 89 minutes
- Countries: Switzerland; France
- Languages: French; Italian; English; Bulgarian; German

Continental Drift (South) (French: La dérive des continents (au sud)) is a 2022 Swiss-French comedy-drama film written by Lionel Baier and Laurent Larivière, directed by Baier and starring Isabelle Carré and Théodore Pellerin.

== Cast ==
- Isabelle Carré as Nathalie Adler
- Théodore Pellerin as Albert Adler
- Ursina Lardi as Ute Lerner
- Ivan Georgiev as Timotei Bacalov

== Release ==
The film premiered at the 2022 Cannes Film Festival in May 2022.

== Reception ==
Allan Hunter of Screen International gave the film a positive review and wrote, "Pleasantly entertaining, Continental Drift has a busy plot that finds easy solutions to complex issues and turns towards the sentimental..." Alex Heeney of Seventh Row said, "Lionel Baier’s biting yet heartfelt Cannes film Continental Drift (South) tackles the migrant crisis and personal failures of empathy with wit and intelligence."
