= Max Karli =

Swiss film producer

Max Karli is a Swiss film producer, best known for producing critically acclaimed film My Life as a Courgette, for which he was nominated for the Academy Award for Best Animated Feature at the 89th Academy Awards, losing to Zootopia.

== Filmography ==
=== As a producer ===
- 2022 Continental Drift (South) (producer)
- 2016 My Life as a Zucchini (producer)
- 2015 Victoria (Short) (producer)
- 2015 Dirty Gold War (Documentary) (producer)
- 2014 The Price of Fame (co-producer)
- 2013 The Bakery (Short) (producer)
- 2013 Salvation Army (co-producer)
- 2013 Longwave (producer)
- 2013 A Better World (Short) (co-producer)
- 2012 En direct de notre passé (TV Series) (co-producer - 1 episode)
- 2012 Déposer les enfants (Short) (producer)
- 2012 Madame W (Short) (producer)
- 2012 The Social Contract (Short) (producer)
- 2012 Les cheveux courts, ronde, petite taille (Documentary short) (producer)
- 2012 Human Race 3D (Short) (producer)
- 2012 Goal (Short) (producer)
- 2012 Détours (Documentary short) (producer)
- 2012 Menuet (Short) (producer)
- 2012 Dans ma peau ou Les principes secrets (Short) (producer)
- 2012 Émile de 1 à 5 (Short) (producer)
- 2011 T'es pas la seule! (TV Series) (producer - 20 episodes)
- 2010 Maman (Short) (producer)
- 2010 System Error (Documentary) (producer)
- 2009 Déchaînées (TV Movie) (producer)
- 2009 Tabou (Documentary) (co-producer)
- 2009 Armes fatales (TV Movie documentary) (producer)
- 2008 La touche (Short) (producer)
- 2008 Heidi, 15 (TV Series) (co-producer)
- 2006 Ceci est mon royaume (TV Movie documentary) (producer)
- 2006 La vraie vie est ailleurs (producer)
- 2004 Promis juré (Short) (producer)
- 2004 Les petites visions (Documentary short) (producer)

=== Other credits ===
- 2003 Skinhead Attitude (Documentary) (first assistant director)
- 2004 Paul s'en va (editor)
- 2012 Operation Libertad (supervising editor)

== Awards and nominations ==
- 2011: Monte-Carlo TV Festival - T'es pas la seule!

Outstanding International Producer - Comedy Series
Outstanding European Producer - Comedy Series

- 2016: Academy Award for Best Animated Feature - My Life as a Zucchini
