= A Kid =

- Film poster
- French: Le Fils de Jean
- Directed by: Philippe Lioret
- Screenplay by: Philippe Lioret; Nathalie Carter
- Based on: Si ce livre pouvait me rapprocher de toi by Jean-Paul Dubois
- Produced by: Marielle Duigou; Philippe Lioret
- Starring: Pierre Deladonchamps; Gabriel Arcand; Catherine De Léan
- Cinematography: Philippe Guilbert
- Edited by: Andrea Sedláčková
- Music by: Flemming Nordkrog
- Production companies: Fin Août Production; Item 7 France 3 Cinéma
- Distributed by: Le Pacte (France)
- Release dates: 28 August 2016 (Angoulême); 31 August 2016 (France)
- Running time: 98 minutes
- Countries: France; Canada
- Language: French
- Budget: $7 million
- Box office: $2.9 million

A Kid (French: Le Fils de Jean) is a 2016 French-Canadian drama film written and directed by Philippe Lioret and starring Pierre Deladonchamps, Gabriel Arcand and Catherine De Léan. It is loosely based on the book Si ce livre pouvait me rapprocher de toi by Jean-Paul Dubois.

== Cast ==
- Pierre Deladonchamps as Mathieu
- Gabriel Arcand as Pierre
- Catherine De Léan as Bettina
- Marie-Thérèse Fortin as Angie
- Pierre-Yves Cardinal as Sam
- Patrick Hivon as Ben
- Lilou Moreau-Champagne as Anna
- Milla Moreau-Champagne as Rose
- Hortense Monsaingeon as Marina
- Romane Portail as Carine
- Timothy Vom Dorp as Valentin
- Martin Laroche as Rémi

== Accolades ==
Award	Date of ceremony	Category	Recipient(s)	Result	Ref(s)
César Awards	24 February 2017	Best Actor	Pierre Deladonchamps	Nominated	
César Awards	24 February 2017	Best Supporting Actor	Gabriel Arcand	Nominated	
Lumière Awards	30 January 2017	Best Actor	Pierre Deladonchamps	Nominated	
Prix Iris	4 June 2017	Best Actor	Gabriel Arcand	Won	
