= Golden Years (2017 film) =

2017 film

- Theatrical release poster
- Directed by: André Téchiné
- Written by: André Téchiné; Cédric Anger
- Produced by: Michèle Halberstadt; Laurent Pétin
- Starring: Pierre Deladonchamps; Céline Sallette; Grégoire Leprince-Ringuet
- Cinematography: Julien Hirsch
- Edited by: Albertine Lastera
- Music by: Alexis Rault
- Distributed by: RP Sélection
- Release dates: 22 May 2017 (Cannes); 13 September 2017 (France)
- Running time: 103 minutes
- Country: France
- Language: French
- Budget: €6.5 million
- Box office: $1 million

Golden Years (French: Nos années folles) is a 2017 French drama film directed by André Téchiné and starring Pierre Deladonchamps and Céline Sallette. The script was written by Téchiné in collaboration with Cédric Anger adapting Fabrice Virgili and Daniele Voldman's nonfiction book La garconne et l'assassin (The Flapper and the Killer). The plot follows a French army deserter who disguised himself as a woman in order to dodge the authorities. It was shown in the Special Screening section at the 2017 Cannes Film Festival.

== Plot ==
The film is based on the true story of a French deserter who went into hiding during World War I, disguising as a woman and female friend of his own wife.

== Cast ==
- Pierre Deladonchamps as Paul Grappe / Suzanne
- Céline Sallette as Louise Grappe
- Grégoire Leprince-Ringuet as Charles de Lauzin
- Virginie Pradal as the grandmother
- Michel Fau as Samuel
- Mama Prassinos as Valentine
- Xavier Robic as the mutilated soldier
