= A Woman's Life (2016 film) =

- Theatrical release poster
- French: Une vie
- Directed by: Stéphane Brizé
- Written by: Stéphane Brizé; Florence Vignon
- Based on: Une vie by Guy de Maupassant
- Produced by: Miléna Poylo; Gilles Sacuto
- Starring: Judith Chemla; Jean-Pierre Darroussin; Yolande Moreau
- Cinematography: Antoine Héberlé
- Edited by: Anne Klotz
- Production companies: TS Productions; France 3 Cinéma; Canal+
- Distributed by: Diaphana Films (France); O'Brother Distribution (Belgium)
- Release dates: 6 September 2016 (Venice); 23 November 2016 (France)
- Running time: 119 minutes
- Countries: France; Belgium
- Language: French
- Budget: $8.2 million
- Box office: $880.000

A Woman's Life (French: Une vie) is a 2016 drama film directed by Stéphane Brizé, co-written with Florence Vignon and based on the Guy de Maupassant's novel Une vie. It follows Jeanne (Judith Chemla) a sensitive noblewoman forced to face the harshness of the world.

The film had its world premiere at the main competition of the 73rd Venice International Film Festival on 6 September 2016, where it won the FIPRESCI Prize for Best Film in competition. It was theatrically released in France by Diaphana Films on 23 November 2016.

It was also awarded the Louis Delluc Prize for Best Film. At the 42nd César Awards, Chemla was nominated for Best Actress.

== Synopsis ==
Normandy, 1819. Baron Simone-Jacques Le Perthuis and his wife Adelaide have one child, Jeanne, whose friend is their servant Rosalie, the same age as her. After meeting the Vicomte Julien de Lamare, she falls in love with him and soon weds. But Jeanne discovers that he has been unfaithful, with Rosalie, who, pregnant by him, is dismissed. Although Jeanne forgives Julien he continues to philander, this time with a neighbour, Gilberte de Fourville. Jeanne tries with the local priest to find a way out of her misery. When Julien is shot by Gilberte's husband, Jeanne's son Paul, in poor health, is educated at home before being sent away aged 12 to boarding school. Paul later falls in love with a prostitute, runs up huge debts, and still feckless runs off to London, regularly writing to ask his mother for money but not visiting her. At 42, Jeanne is alone except for Rosalie, who has come back to help her childhood friend. The last line of the film (and the book) is "Life, you see, is never as good or as bad as one thinks”.

== Cast ==
- Judith Chemla as Jeanne du Perthuis des Vauds
- Jean-Pierre Darroussin as Simon-Jacques Le Perthuis des Vauds
- Yolande Moreau as Adélaïde Le Perthuis des Vauds
- Swann Arlaud as Julien de Lamare
- Nina Meurisse as Rosalie
- Finnegan Oldfield as Paul de Lamare
- Clotilde Hesme as Gilberte de Fourville
- Alain Beigel as Georges de Fourville
- Olivier Perrier as Picot
- François-Xavier Ledoux as Tolbiac
- Lucette Beudin as Ludivine
- Sarah Durand as Françoise
- Marc Olry as Ferdinant de Vauvert
- Lise Lamétrie as Cousin Rose

== Production ==
sing a hand-held camera, Brizé framed the production in 4:3 format (also known as 1.33:1), creating a sense of imprisonment for the lead character. French cinematographer Antoine Héberlé was the director of photography.

Principal photography took place on location in Normandy, beginning in 24 August 2015.

In his first film work, the harpsichordist Olivier Baumont provides the soundtrack, playing his own score on the pianoforte, while also including themes from works by Jacques Duphly.

== Accolades ==
Award / Film Festival	Category	Recipients	Result
César Awards	Best Actress	Judith Chemla	Nominated
César Awards	Best Costume Design	Madeline Fontaine	Nominated
Louis Delluc Prize	Best Film		Won
Magritte Awards	Best Supporting Actress	Yolande Moreau	Nominated
Lumière Awards	Best Film		Nominated
Lumière Awards	Best Director	Stéphane Brizé	Nominated
Lumière Awards	Best Actress	Judith Chemla	Nominated
Lumière Awards	Best Cinematography	Antoine Héberlé	Nominated
Venice International Film Festival	FIPRESCI Prize		Won
Venice International Film Festival	Golden Lion		Nominated

== See also ==
- One Life (1958 film), directed by Alexandre Astruc, French drama also based on the Maupassant novel
