= Lucas Prisor =

German actor

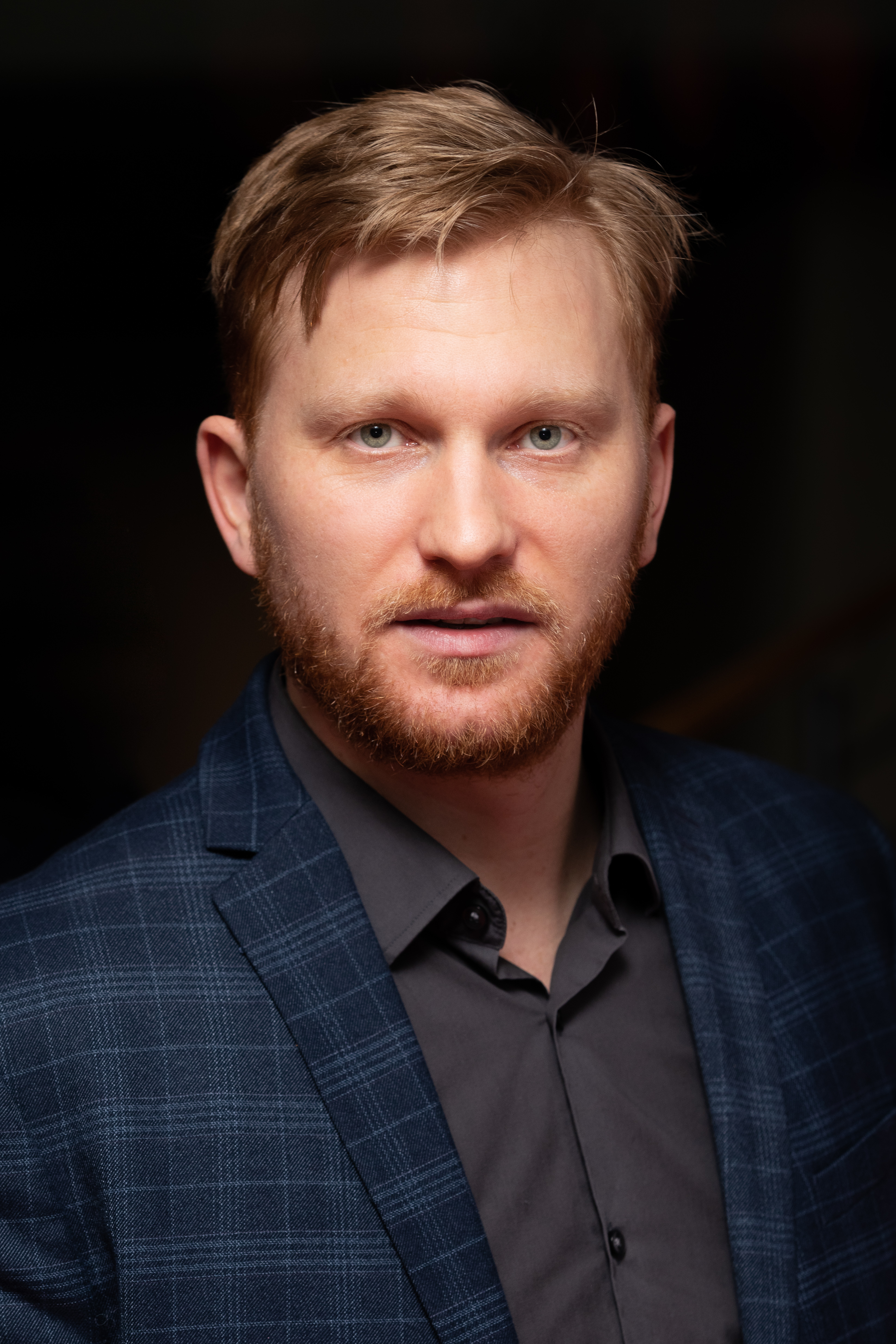
Lucas Prisor, 2020

Lucas Prisor (born 23 September 1983) is a German actor.

== Awards and nominations ==
- 2025: Prix du jury at the international film festival in Cannes for Sound of falling
- 2023: Grimme-Preis for Im Feuer – Zwei Schwestern
- 2023: Grimme-Preis for Neuland
- 2022: Grimme-Preis for Polizeiruf 110 – Sabine
- 2022: Deutscher Filmpreis for Der Pfad
- 2017: Golden Globe Award (best foreign film) for Elle
- 2017: César for Elle for best film
- 2017: ZEUS Award (Best Actor) at Independent Days Filmfest for the short movie Samira
- Nominated for the Palme d'Or at film festival in Cannes for Young and beautiful by Francois Ozon
- 2009: Vontobel- & Ensemblepreis for the theatre play Ego-Shooter: Generation Peer

== Life and career ==
Prisor was born in Hannover, Germany. During his school career he spent one year in New York City. After graduating he studied acting in Leipzig, before moving to Berlin to work at the Berliner Ensemble and at the Volksbühne.

He also lived in Paris where he started to work with French director François Ozon, academy award winner Volker Schlöndorff and Paul Verhoeven.

He lives in Berlin and Paris.

== Filmography ==
- 2013: Un village français by Jean-Marc Brondolo
- 2013: Jeune et jolie by François Ozon
- 2013: Mein Lover, sein Vater und ich! by Holger Haase
- 2014: Un Tour de Cheville by Guillaume Levil
- 2014: Diplomacy (film) by Volker Schlöndorff
- 2014: Die Pilgerin by Philipp Kadelbach
- 2015: After the Fall by Carlo Rola
- 2015: Tatort - Wer Wind erntet, sät Sturm by Florian Baxmeyer
- 2015: Lotte Jäger und das tote Mädchen by Sherry Hormann
- 2016: Elle by Paul Verhoeven
- 2017: Un sac de billes by Christian Duguay
- 2017: Charité
- 2017: Our Patriots by Gabriel Le Bomin
- 2017: War Photographer by Bernd Wunder
- 2018: Friendly Fire by Daphne Charizani
- 2019: My Zoë by Julie Delpy
- 2022: Der Pfad by Tobias Wiemann
- 2025: Sound of Falling by Mascha Schilinski

== Theatre ==
- 2009: "Das Abenteuerliche Herz: Droge und Rausch" directed by Martin Wuttke (Berliner Ensemble)
- 2009: "Trilogie der schönen Ferienzeit" directed by Claus Peymann (Berliner Ensemble)
- 2009: "Leonce and Lena" directed by Robert Wilson (director) (Berliner Ensemble)
- 2009: "Nathan the Wise" directed by Claus Peymann (Berliner Ensemble)
- 2010: "Oedipus at Colonus" directed by Peter Stein (Salzburger Festspiele)
- 2011: "A Streetcar Named Desire (play)" directed by Thomas Langhoff (Berliner Ensemble)
- 2011: "Die Sonne" directed by Olivier Py (Volksbühne Berlin and Odeon Theatre Paris)
- 2016: "Lear (opera)" directed by Calixto Bieito (Opera of Paris)
