= Elle (film) =

2016 film by Paul Verhoeven

- Theatrical release poster
- Directed by: Paul Verhoeven
- Screenplay by: David Birke
- Based on: Oh... by Philippe Djian
- Produced by: Saïd Ben Saïd; Michel Merkt
- Starring: Isabelle Huppert; Laurent Lafitte; Anne Consigny; Charles Berling; Virginie Efira; Judith Magre; Christian Berkel; Jonas Bloquet; Alice Isaaz; Vimala Pons; Arthur Mazet; Raphaël Lenglet; Lucas Prisor
- Cinematography: Stéphane Fontaine
- Edited by: Job ter Burg
- Music by: Anne Dudley
- Production companies: SBS Productions; Twenty Twenty Vision Filmproduktion; France 2 Cinéma; Entre Chien et Loup; Proximus
- Distributed by: SBS Distribution (France); MFA+ Filmdistribution (Germany)
- Release dates: 21 May 2016 (Cannes); 25 May 2016 (France); 16 February 2017 (Germany)
- Running time: 130 minutes
- Countries: France; Germany
- Language: French
- Budget: $9.1 million
- Box office: $12.7 million

Elle (French for 'she' / 'her') is a 2016 psychological thriller film directed by Paul Verhoeven from a screenplay by David Birke, based on the 2012 novel Oh... by Philippe Djian. The film stars Isabelle Huppert as a businesswoman who is raped in her home by a masked assailant.

The film was Verhoeven's first feature since 2006's Black Book, and his first in French. It was selected to compete for the Palme d'Or at the 2016 Cannes Film Festival where it received critical acclaim. Elle won the Golden Globe Award for Best Foreign Language Film and Critics' Choice Movie Award for Best Foreign Language Film; it was also selected as the French entry for the Academy Award for Best Foreign Language Film, but was not nominated. At the 42nd César Awards in France, the film received eleven nominations, and won Best Film. Huppert's performance was widely acclaimed, considered to be one of the finest of her career. She was nominated for the Academy Award for Best Actress, and won several Best Actress awards, including the Golden Globe and the César.

== Plot ==
Michèle Leblanc is raped in her home by an assailant in a ski mask. She then cleans up the mess and resumes her life. She is the head of a successful video game company, where her male employees are alternately resentful of or infatuated with her. She carries on an affair with Robert, the husband of her friend and business partner Anna, and flirts with her married neighbor Patrick. Michèle feels detached from her son Vincent, who submits to his abusive, pregnant girlfriend Josie. She has a contentious relationship with her mother, Irène, whom she resents for her narcissism and involvements with younger men. Furthermore, she is the daughter of an infamous mass murderer whose parole hearing is approaching. Haunted by her father's actions, Michèle is wary of law enforcement and does not report her rape to police.

Michèle grows increasingly suspicious of the men in her life. She receives harassing text messages from her assailant at a blocked number, indicating he is stalking her. She at first suspects Kurt, a particularly resentful employee, when a CGI animation of a monster raping her is emailed to everyone at the company. She pepper-sprays a man lurking outside her house, only to find out it is her ex-husband Richard, who was checking on her safety. She later discovers that another employee, who has been infatuated with her, created the animation but did not rape her.

On Christmas Eve, Irène suffers a stroke and begs her daughter to go see her father before she dies in hospital. Michèle is later attacked in her home by the assailant and, after stabbing his hand and unmasking him, learns that he is Patrick. Though she now knows his identity and realizes that he is able to enter her home despite having her locks changed, she still does not call the police and takes no measures to increase her home security.

Michèle decides to visit her father after his parole application is rejected, only to find that he has hanged himself hours before she arrives. On the way home from the prison, she gets into a car crash in a secluded area. Rather than calling an ambulance, she first tries to call her friends, and then decides to call Patrick. After he rescues her from the car and bandages her, Michèle courts a brazenly dangerous sexual relationship with him. She engages in a vivid rape scenario with him. The two of them walk a delicate line in which Patrick has to feel as though he is raping Michèle, even though she consents to the roleplay.

Michèle grows increasingly disillusioned with her life leading up to the launch party for her company's new video game. She confesses to Anna that she was having an affair with Robert. As Patrick drives her home, Michèle professes that she is no longer in denial about their unhealthy relationship and claims she intends to call the police. She takes her time walking in front of his parked car after getting out, and then makes a point of leaving her gate unlocked. Patrick enters and attacks her in an ambiguous encounter that blurs the line between rape and consent, but Vincent, who was already in the house, sneaks up behind Patrick and bashes him in the back of the skull. Michèle appears to remain largely composed, but Patrick is seemingly confused as he dies.

Michèle speaks briefly with Patrick's wife Rebecca as she is moving out of the neighbourhood. Rebecca is placid and expresses gratitude to Michèle for being able to temporarily "satisfy Patrick's needs". Vincent is now more assertive in his relationship and career, while Michèle reconciles with both Josie and Anna; the latter offers to move in with her now that they have both severed their relationships with Robert.

== Cast ==
- Isabelle Huppert as Michèle Leblanc
- Laurent Lafitte as Patrick, Michèle's neighbor
- Anne Consigny as Anna
- Charles Berling as Richard Casamayou, Michèle's ex-husband
- Virginie Efira as Rebecca, Patrick's wife
- Judith Magre as Irène Leblanc, Michèle's mother
- Christian Berkel as Robert, Anna's husband
- Jonas Bloquet as Vincent, Michèle's son
- Alice Isaaz as Josie
- Vimala Pons as Hélène
- Raphaël Lenglet as Ralf
- Arthur Mazet as Kevin, Michèle's employee
- Lucas Prisor as Kurt, Michèle's employee

== Production ==
=== Development ===
Paul Verhoeven stated that he felt the movie was an opportunity for him to do "something very different to anything I've done before. But this stepping into the unknown, I think it's very important in the life of an artist. It puts you in an existential mode. As an artist you have to, as much as possible, step into the unknown and see what happens to you." The project was unveiled at the Marché du Film during the 2014 Cannes Film Festival where it was described as "pure Verhoeven, extremely erotic and perverted." Verhoeven was looking for an actress who would be "prepared to take that on" and believed Nicole Kidman "could handle this role." He also considered Charlize Theron, Julianne Moore, Sharon Stone, Marion Cotillard, Diane Lane, and Carice van Houten for the role of Michèle, a businesswoman who is raped in her home by an unknown assailant and refuses to let it alter her precisely ordered life. Verhoeven told The Guardian that he reckons that the only American actress who would have been willing is Jennifer Jason Leigh. "She would have had absolutely no problem, she's extremely audacious. But she's an artistic presence and we were looking for names," he said. Verhoeven's inability to convince a major American actress to play the part left him frustrated, as he later explained, "I agree that there are not many female parts – certainly not in American cinema. It's weird that when there is one, they lacked the audacity to be controversial. I hope all these actresses see the movie."

The film was originally supposed to take place in Boston or Chicago but, according to Verhoeven, it proved to be "too difficult" to shoot the film in the United States due to its violent and immoral content as "that would have meant getting more into the direction of Basic Instinct, but a lot of the things that are important in the movie would probably have been diminished. By bringing it more into a thriller direction, I think it would have lost everything. It would probably have been banal and transparent. The mystery would have gone." Verhoeven then decided to do it in French and used a significant time before production to learn the language, in order to effectively communicate with the predominantly French cast and crew. In September 2014, French actress Isabelle Huppert signed on to star in the film as Michèle. Huppert had expressed interest in a screen adaptation of the book before Verhoeven, whom she described as "one of the best directors in the world for me," joined the production and accepted the part immediately, "I had no doubt about the integrity to the role. Of course if you just circle the story to the rape and a woman being attracted by the man who raped her, I mean, that really makes the whole purpose very, very narrow and limited. I think it's a lot more than this. And she's really an interesting character because she always goes against predictable definitions of what it means to be a woman, what it means to be a man. Obviously, the movie's about a woman. But it's also about men, you know, and the men are sort of fading figures, very weak, quite fragile. So it's really also about the empowerment of a woman."

=== Filming ===
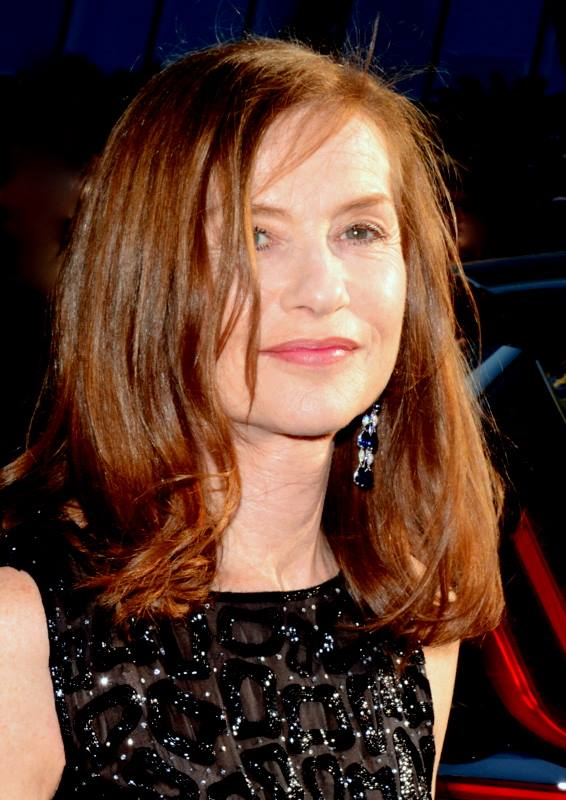
Leading actress Isabelle Huppert

Principal photography began on 10 January 2015 for a ten-week shoot. Filming took place in and around Paris. A planned sequence in Paris' main police station was cancelled following the Charlie Hebdo shooting on 7 January. The film was also shot in a house for Huppert's character in Saint-Germain-en-Laye for five weeks. Verhoeven's mise-en-scène for the film was influenced by three films: Federico Fellini's 8½, Jean Renoir's The Rules of the Game and Orson Welles' Touch of Evil. Every scene was choreographed, and Verhoeven storyboarded the whole film himself. He chose to shoot the film with two Red Dragon cameras, as "These days the amount of time a director is given to make a movie has diminished by 40 to 50 percent. Working with two cameras solves part of that problem while giving you the opportunity to do things that you wouldn't do before."

When the film wrapped, Verhoeven described the shoot as "difficult" but later admitted that "in retrospect, it was very pleasant and easy." He dismissed rumors that Elle was an "erotic thriller" in the tradition of some his previous films, including Basic Instinct, "Those people who think that this is an erotic film will be disillusioned. They are in for a strange confrontation with a movie that is... not ordinary. I don't think the story is erotic; it's about rape. An erotic thriller would be a bit weird, right? I mean, it might be erotic for the person doing it, but I don't think that rape in general is something you would call erotic." On 13 May 2015, he told Variety he had "a strong feeling with this one that I was doing something that I'd never done before, which applied when I made RoboCop." He also praised Huppert's performance, saying that "She is an extremely gifted actress that gives you more than what's on paper… even what's in the book. She does experiments in her mind to get to places that she would probably avoid in reality. And she does that in an absolutely unique way." He also said in an interview with Film Comment:

She's one of the most brilliant actors I've ever met in my life. She's so extremely special and is able to avoid any cliché in any situation, always finding a different way of doing things. She comes up with all kinds of extra details that you wouldn't even dream of, that I would never come up with on my own. She's not only a great actress but she is also especially imaginative and creative in her approach to the character. I didn't have to tell her anything about Michèle because it was clear from the first shot that she knew exactly what her character would do and how she would behave in whatever circumstance. She is extremely audacious and she really had no problem with anything that was in the script, so I have an enormous respect for her.

During the rape scene, Isabelle Huppert struggles and then says 'Arrête!' ('Stop it!', in French), which was not written in the script. "It was very violent, I must say. I was a little scared, too. So I had to make them understand that they shouldn't go any further... Sometimes, when there are very physical scenes, like this one, you can hurt yourself. It's part of the things that you don't understand. It was not planned that I say it, even less in French. I felt that they needed to hear something different," Huppert said.

=== Music ===
The score of Elle was composed by English composer Anne Dudley and was released on 23 September 2016.

== Release ==
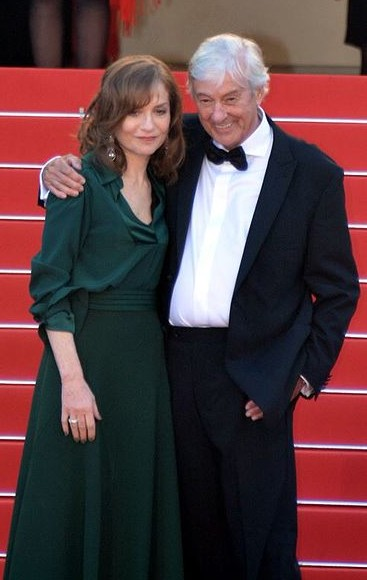
Huppert and Verhoeven promoting the film at the 2016 Cannes Film Festival

The first poster for the film was released in May 2015, during the Cannes Film Festival where SBS Productions sold the film internationally. On 16 January 2016, the first trailer and the final poster were released. On 11 March 2016, French film magazine Le Film français announced that SBS Distribution had brought forward the release date from 21 September to 25 May 2016. On 14 April 2016, it was announced that the film had been selected to compete for the Palme d'Or in the main competition section at the Cannes Film Festival. On 27 April 2016, several images of the film were released.

On 11 May 2016, it was announced Sony Pictures Classics had acquired distribution rights to release the film in North America, Latin America, Australia, New Zealand, Scandinavia, Eastern Europe (excluding Russia) and Asia (excluding China and Japan). Sony, who had previously acquired Verhoeven's Black Book, said in a statement: "This thriller is Paul Verhoeven at his very best and Isabelle Huppert gives the performance of a lifetime. Elle promises to be a hit with audiences this fall." Verhoeven added: "Sony has always been my home in the US, and I'm excited that Sony Classics will take care of Elle with the wonderful actress Isabelle Huppert. I'm pleased that even my European films have ended up with them." Following the film's Cannes premiere, Sony announced its theatrical release in the United States on 11 November 2016.

On 12 August 2016, it was announced Picturehouse had acquired distribution rights to release the film in the United Kingdom and Ireland. Clare Binns, director of programming and acquisition at Picturehouse, praised Verhoeven, whom she described as "a master filmmaker who has always made provocative and exciting work without compromise—Elle is no exception" and also said, "This gripping, multilayered thriller bowled me over in Cannes and I know it's going to be a big talking point. This is what proper cinema for adults is all about." The film was released in the United Kingdom on 10 March 2017, which made it not eligible for the 70th British Academy Film Awards.

The film also screened at the Toronto International Film Festival on 8 September 2016, the San Sebastián International Film Festival on 18 September, the BFI London Film Festival on 8 October, the New York Film Festival on 14 October, and the AFI Fest on 13 November, where Isabelle Huppert was honored with a special tribute to her career.

The film was screened at the 72nd Berlin International Film Festival in February 2022, where it was one of the homage films to honour Huppert with Honorary Golden Bear for Lifetime Achievement.

== Reception ==
=== Critical response ===
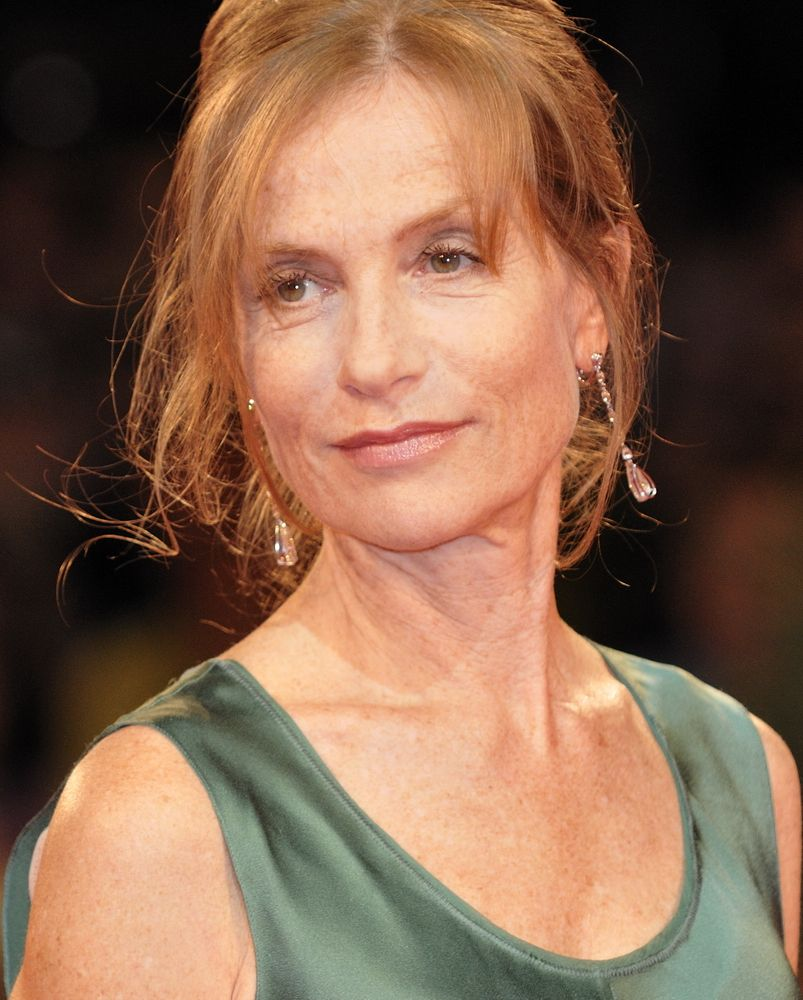
Isabelle Huppert's performance garnered critical acclaim and she received an Academy Award nomination for Best Actress. She also won her first Golden Globe award for her performance in the film.

Elle received widespread critical acclaim, with particular praise for Huppert's performance and Verhoeven's direction. On review aggregator Rotten Tomatoes, the film holds an approval rating of 91% based on 245 reviews, with an average rating of 8.00/10. The website's critical consensus says, "Elle finds director Paul Verhoeven operating at peak power—and benefiting from a typically outstanding performance from Isabelle Huppert in the central role." At Metacritic, which assigns a normalized rating to reviews, the film received an average score of 89 out of 100, based on 36 critics, indicating "universal acclaim".

The film received a seven-minute standing ovation at its Cannes Film Festival international premiere. Leslie Felperin of The Hollywood Reporter called it "the most empowering 'Rape Movie' ever made," and wrote, "Paul Verhoeven's film about a woman's complicated response to being raped will draw ire from feminists and others, but it's one of the bravest, most honest and inspiring examinations of the subject ever put onscreen." Stéphane Delorme of Cahiers du cinéma wrote the film was "a striking return for the Dutchman. We didn't dare dream of such an audacious, generous film." Guy Lodge of Variety said, "Isabelle Huppert might be our best living actor, and Elle might be Paul Verhoeven's best film." Eric Kohn of IndieWire described it as a "lighthearted rape-revenge story." Jordan Mintzer of The Hollywood Reporter called the film a "tastefully twisted mid-to-late-life crisis thriller that's both lasciviously dark and rebelliously light on its feet" and added that Verhoeven and Huppert "combine their talents to make a film that hardly skimps on the sex, violence and sadism, yet ultimately tells a story about how one woman uses them all to set herself free." Jason Gorber of Twitch Film thought the film was "a masterwork by a master filmmaker, while Huppert's performance reminds the world once again what a treasure she is." Ben Croll of TheWrap believed the film was "riotously funny, and Isabelle Huppert has never been better."

Christopher Hooton of The Independent said it was "Cannes' only real high point." Xan Brooks of The Guardian found the film "utterly gripping and endlessly disturbing" and wrote, "Isabelle Huppert delivers a standout performance as a woman turning the tables on her attacker in the controversial director's electrifying and provocative comeback." Lisa Nesselson of Screen Daily found that Huppert's "self-assured-and-aloof register is a perfect fit with Verhoeven's taste for far-fetched human behaviour presented as plausible," and described the film as "suspenseful and unsettling from first frame to last." David Sexton of The Evening Standard labeled the film as "outrageous, funny and shocking, exhilarating and original." Catherine Bray of Time Out wrote the film "might just be the most Paul Verhoeven film yet, due to its willingness to push buttons, explore transgressive territory and take constant delight in venturing where the vast majority of filmmakers would fear to tread" and predicted, "It's a film that will inspire debate for decades to come."

Richard Brody of The New Yorker wrote, "Elle is no exploration of a woman's life or psyche but a macho fantasy adorned with the trappings of liberation." Bidisha, writing in The Guardian, rounded on the film's racist humour and for perpetuating misogynistic stereotypes about domestic abuse and rape fantasies: "In a vicious insult to all survivors of men's sexual violence, the filmmakers have recast the perpetrator and his victim as being in some kind of relationship or affair driven by her masochism, in which his abusiveness is simply a necessary fuel... It's a classic, malicious lie: that rape awakens women's sexuality."

=== Top ten lists ===
Elle was listed on numerous critics' top ten lists.

- 1st – Ignatiy Vishnevetsky, The A.V. Club
- 1st – Brian Formo, Collider
- 1st – Sean Axmaker, Parallax View
- 1st – Michael Snydel, RogerEbert.com
- 1st – Lisa Nesselson, Screen Daily
- 2nd – Cahiers du cinéma
- 2nd – The Film Stage
- 2nd – Nicholas Bell, Ioncinema.com
- 2nd – Dennis Dermody, Paper
- 2nd – Screen Anarchy
- 2nd – Lee Marshall, Screen Daily
- 2nd – Simon Abrams, RogerEbert.com
- 2nd – Danny Bowes, RogerEbert.com
- 2nd – Seongyong Cho, RogerEbert.com
- 2nd – Peter Sobczynski, RogerEbert.com
- 3rd – Aubrey Page, Collider.com
- 3rd – The Guardian
- 3rd – Sheila O'Malley, RogerEbert.com
- 3rd – Fionnuala Halligan, Screen Daily
- 3rd – Calvin Wilson, St. Louis Post-Dispatch
- 4th – Marjorie Baumgarten, The Austin Chronicle
- 4th – Matt Prigge, Metro US
- 4th – Andrew Wright, Salt Lake City Weekly
- 4th – Stephanie Zacharek, Time
- 4th – Screen Daily
- 5th – Mick LaSalle, San Francisco Chronicle
- 5th – Gregory Ellwood, The Playlist
- 5th – Ben Kenigsberg, RogerEbert.com
- 5th – Slant Magazine
- 6th – Peter Debruge, Variety
- 6th – Todd McCarthy, The Hollywood Reporter
- 6th – John Waters, Artforum
- 6th – Alison Willmore, BuzzFeed
- 6th – Nick Schager, Esquire
- 6th – David Hudson, Fandor
- 6th – Movie Mezzanine
- 6th – Tina Hassannia, RogerEbert.com
- 7th – Mark Olsen, Los Angeles Times
- 7th – Steven Erickson, RogerEbert.com
- 8th – Katie Rife, The A.V. Club
- 8th – Stephen Holden, The New York Times
- 8th – Patrick McGavin, RogerEbert.com
- 8th – Erin Whitney, ScreenCrush
- 9th – Melissa Anderson, Artforum
- 9th – Consequence of Sound
- 9th – Ben Barna, Nylon
- 10th – A. O. Scott, The New York Times (tied with Things to Come)
- 10th – Bill Stamets, RogerEbert.com
- Top 10 (listed alphabetically, not ranked) – Walter Addiego, San Francisco Chronicle

=== Accolades ===
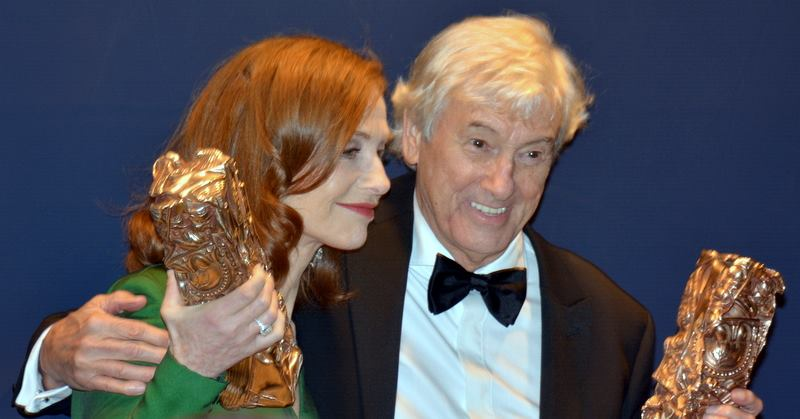
Huppert and Verhoeven at the 42nd César Awards

On 26 September 2016, the French National Center of Cinematography and the Moving Image selected Elle as the French entry for the Best Foreign Language Film at the 89th Academy Awards. When the Academy of Motion Picture Arts and Sciences announced a shortlist of nine pictures competing for the category on 15 December 2016 that did not include Elle, many media, including The Hollywood Reporter, The New York Times, Entertainment Weekly, The Independent and The Guardian, slammed Elle's omission as a "snub." Gregory Ellwood of The Playlist wrote that the film became "one of [the] greatest Oscar Foreign Language Film Snubs of all-time."

| Award | Date of ceremony | Category | Recipient(s) | Result | Ref(s) |
|---|---|---|---|---|---|
| AACTA International Awards | 8 January 2017 | Best Actress | Isabelle Huppert | Nominated | |
| AARP Annual Movies for Grownups Awards | 6 February 2017 | Best Actress | Isabelle Huppert | Nominated | |
| AARP Annual Movies for Grownups Awards | 6 February 2017 | Best Foreign Language Film | Elle | Won | |
| Academy Awards | 26 February 2017 | Best Actress | Isabelle Huppert | Nominated | |
| Alliance of Women Film Journalists | 21 December 2016 | Best Non-English-Language Film | Elle | Nominated | |
| Alliance of Women Film Journalists | 21 December 2016 | Best Actress | Isabelle Huppert | Nominated | |
| Alliance of Women Film Journalists | 21 December 2016 | Actress Defying Age and Ageism | Isabelle Huppert | Won (Note: Tied with Annette Bening for 20th Century Women) | |
| Alliance of Women Film Journalists | 21 December 2016 | Bravest Performance | Isabelle Huppert | Won | |
| Austin Film Critics Association | 28 December 2016 | Best Film | Elle | 6th Place | |
| Austin Film Critics Association | 28 December 2016 | Best Actress | Isabelle Huppert | Won | |
| Austin Film Critics Association | 28 December 2016 | Best Foreign-Language Film | Elle | Nominated | |
| Australian Film Critics Association | 7 March 2017 | Best International Film (Foreign Language) | Elle | Nominated | |
| Boston Society of Film Critics | 11 December 2016 | Best Actress | Isabelle Huppert (also for Things to Come) | Won | |
| British Academy Film Awards | 18 February 2018 | Best Film Not in the English Language | Paul Verhoeven, Saïd Ben Saïd | Nominated | |
| Cannes Film Festival | 22 May 2016 | Palme d'Or | Paul Verhoeven | Nominated | |
| César Awards | 24 February 2017 | Best Film | Saïd Ben Saïd, Michel Merkt, Paul Verhoeven | Won | |
| César Awards | 24 February 2017 | Best Director | Paul Verhoeven | Nominated | |
| César Awards | 24 February 2017 | Best Actress | Isabelle Huppert | Won | |
| César Awards | 24 February 2017 | Best Supporting Actor | Laurent Lafitte | Nominated | |
| César Awards | 24 February 2017 | Best Supporting Actress | Anne Consigny | Nominated | |
| César Awards | 24 February 2017 | Most Promising Actor | Jonas Bloquet | Nominated | |
| César Awards | 24 February 2017 | Best Adaptation | David Birke | Nominated | |
| César Awards | 24 February 2017 | Best Cinematography | Stéphane Fontaine | Nominated | |
| César Awards | 24 February 2017 | Best Editing | Job ter Burg | Nominated | |
| César Awards | 24 February 2017 | Best Original Music | Anne Dudley | Nominated | |
| César Awards | 24 February 2017 | Best Sound | Jean-Paul Mugel, Alexis Place, Cyril Holtz and Damien Lazzerini | Nominated | |
| Chicago Film Critics Association | 15 December 2016 | Best Actress | Isabelle Huppert | Nominated | |
| Chicago Film Critics Association | 15 December 2016 | Best Adapted Screenplay | David Birke | Nominated | |
| Chicago Film Critics Association | 15 December 2016 | Best Foreign Language Film | Elle | Nominated | |
| Critics' Choice Movie Awards | 11 December 2016 | Best Actress | Isabelle Huppert | Nominated | |
| Critics' Choice Movie Awards | 11 December 2016 | Best Foreign Language Film | Elle | Won | |
| Dorian Awards | 26 January 2017 | Film Performance of the Year — Actress | Isabelle Huppert | Nominated | |
| Dorian Awards | 26 January 2017 | Foreign Language Film of the Year | Elle | Nominated | |
| Dublin Film Critics' Circle | 13 December 2017 | Best Actress | Isabelle Huppert | Won (Note: Tied with Natalie Portman for Jackie) | |
| Dublin Film Critics' Circle | 13 December 2017 | Best Director | Paul Verhoeven | 7th Place (Note: Tied with Yorgos Lanthimos for The Killing of a Sacred Deer) | |
| Ebertfest | 22 April 2017 | Golden Thumb | Isabelle Huppert | Won | |
| European Film Awards | 10 December 2016 | Best Film | Elle | Nominated | |
| European Film Awards | 10 December 2016 | Best Director | Paul Verhoeven | Nominated | |
| European Film Awards | 10 December 2016 | Best Actress | Isabelle Huppert | Nominated | |
| Florida Film Critics Circle | 23 December 2016 | Best Actress | Isabelle Huppert | Won | |
| Florida Film Critics Circle | 23 December 2016 | Best Foreign Language Film | Elle | Won | |
| Globes de Cristal Award | 30 January 2017 | Best Actress | Isabelle Huppert | Won | |
| Golden Globe Awards | 8 January 2017 | Best Actress – Motion Picture Drama | Isabelle Huppert | Won | |
| Golden Globe Awards | 8 January 2017 | Best Foreign Language Film | Elle | Won | |
| Gotham Awards | 28 November 2016 | Best Actress | Isabelle Huppert | Won | |
| Goya Awards | 4 February 2017 | Best European Film | Elle | Won | |
| Houston Film Critics Society | 6 January 2017 | Best Actress | Isabelle Huppert | Nominated | |
| Houston Film Critics Society | 6 January 2017 | Best Foreign Language Film | Elle | Nominated | |
| Independent Spirit Awards | 25 February 2017 | Best Female Lead | Isabelle Huppert | Won | |
| IndieWire Critics Poll | 19 December 2016 | Best Actress | Isabelle Huppert | Won | |
| IndieWire Critics Poll | 19 December 2016 | Best Director | Paul Verhoeven | 9th Place | |
| London Film Critics' Circle | 28 January 2018 | Actress of the Year | Isabelle Huppert | Nominated | |
| London Film Critics' Circle | 28 January 2018 | Foreign Language Film of the Year | Elle | Won | |
| London Film Festival | 15 October 2016 | Best Film | Elle | Nominated | |
| Los Angeles Film Critics Association | 4 December 2016 | Best Actress | Isabelle Huppert (also for Things to Come) | Won | |
| Lumière Awards | 30 January 2017 | Best Film | Elle | Won | |
| Lumière Awards | 30 January 2017 | Best Director | Paul Verhoeven | Won | |
| Lumière Awards | 30 January 2017 | Best Actress | Isabelle Huppert | Won | |
| Lumière Awards | 30 January 2017 | Best Screenplay | David Birke | Nominated | |
| Magritte Awards | 4 February 2017 | Best Supporting Actress | Virginie Efira | Nominated | |
| National Board of Review | 29 November 2016 | Top 5 Foreign Films | Elle | Won | |
| National Society of Film Critics | 7 January 2017 | Best Actress | Isabelle Huppert (also for Things to Come) | Won | |
| National Society of Film Critics | 7 January 2017 | Best Foreign Language Film | Elle | 3rd Place (Note: Tied with Things to Come) | |
| New York Film Critics Circle | 1 December 2016 | Best Actress | Isabelle Huppert (also for Things to Come) | Won | |
| New York Film Critics Online | 11 December 2016 | Best Actress | Isabelle Huppert | Won | |
| Online Film Critics Society | 3 January 2017 | Best Actress | Isabelle Huppert | Nominated | |
| Online Film Critics Society | 3 January 2017 | Best Adapted Screenplay | David Birke, Philippe Djian | Nominated | |
| Online Film Critics Society | 3 January 2017 | Best Film Not in the English Language | Elle | Nominated | |
| Palm Springs International Film Festival | 14 January 2017 | FIPRESCI Prize for Best Actress in a Foreign Language Film | Isabelle Huppert | Won | |
| San Francisco Film Critics Circle | 11 December 2016 | Best Actress | Isabelle Huppert | Won | |
| San Francisco Film Critics Circle | 11 December 2016 | Best Adapted Screenplay | David Birke | Nominated | |
| San Francisco Film Critics Circle | 11 December 2016 | Best Foreign Language Film | Elle | Nominated | |
| Santa Barbara International Film Festival | 8 February 2017 | Montecito Award | Isabelle Huppert | Won | |
| Satellite Awards | 19 February 2017 | Best Actress | Isabelle Huppert | Won (Note: Tied with Ruth Negga for Loving) | |
| Satellite Awards | 19 February 2017 | Best Foreign Language Film | Elle | Nominated | |
| Saturn Awards | 28 June 2017 | Best International Film | Elle | Nominated | |
| Seattle Film Critics Society | 5 January 2017 | Best Picture of the Year | Elle | Nominated | |
| Seattle Film Critics Society | 5 January 2017 | Best Foreign Language Film | Elle | Won | |
| Seattle Film Critics Society | 5 January 2017 | Best Director | Paul Verhoeven | Nominated | |
| Seattle Film Critics Society | 5 January 2017 | Best Actress in a Leading Role | Isabelle Huppert | Won | |
| St. Louis Film Critics Association | 18 December 2016 | Best Actress | Isabelle Huppert | Won | |
| St. Louis Film Critics Association | 18 December 2016 | Best Foreign Language Film | Elle | Won | |
| Toronto Film Critics Association | 11 December 2016 | Best Actress | Isabelle Huppert | Runner-up | |
| Toronto Film Critics Association | 11 December 2016 | Best Foreign Language Film | Elle | Runner-up | |
| Vancouver Film Critics Circle | 20 December 2016 | Best Actress | Isabelle Huppert | Won | |
| Vancouver Film Critics Circle | 20 December 2016 | Best Foreign-Language Film | Elle | Nominated | |
| Village Voice Film Poll | 21 December 2016 | Best Actress | Isabelle Huppert | Won | |
| Washington D.C. Area Film Critics Association | 5 December 2016 | Best Foreign Language Film | Elle | Won | |

== See also ==
- List of submissions to the 89th Academy Awards for Best Foreign Language Film
- List of French submissions for the Academy Award for Best Foreign Language Film
