= Rise of a Star =

French short film directed by James Bort

- French: Naissance d'une Étoile
- Directed by: James Bort
- Written by: Stéphane Landowski
- Produced by: Boris Mendza; Gaël Cabouat; David Atrakchi
- Starring: Dorothée Gilbert; Catherine Deneuve; Pierre Deladonchamps; Antonia Desplat
- Cinematography: Mahdi Lepart
- Edited by: Guillaume Lauras
- Production company: FullDawa Films
- Release date: 2017
- Running time: 19 minutes
- Country: France
- Language: French

Rise of a Star (Original French title: Naissance d'une Étoile) is a 2017 French drama short film directed by James Bort and written by Stéphane Landowski. Produced for FullDawa Films (founded by Boris Mendza, Gaël Cabouat and David Atrakchi), it was shot at the Palais Garnier, home of the Paris Opera Ballet. It was shortlisted for the Academy Award for Best Live Action Short Film at the 90th Academy Awards in 2018.

== Synopsis ==
Emma is a celebrated ballerina bothered by a secret capable of undermining the achievement of her lifelong dream.

== Cast ==
- Dorothée Gilbert as Emma
- Catherine Deneuve as Mrs Jean
- Pierre Deladonchamps as Youri
- Antonia Desplat as Victoire

== Release ==
The film premiered at the Tribeca Film Festival in 2018.

== Reception ==
Le Journal du Centre reviewed the short favorably, praising Bort as a first-time director.
