= 150 Milligrams =

2016 film

- Theatrical release poster
- Directed by: Emmanuelle Bercot
- Screenplay by: Séverine Bosschem; Emmanuelle Bercot; Romain Compingt
- Based on: Mediator 150 mg by Irène Frachon
- Produced by: Caroline Benjo; Carole Scotta
- Starring: Sidse Babett Knudsen; Benoît Magimel
- Cinematography: Guillaume Schiffman
- Edited by: Julien Leloup
- Music by: Martin Wheeler
- Distributed by: Haut et Court
- Release dates: 12 September 2016 (TIFF); 23 November 2016 (France)
- Running time: 128 minutes
- Country: France
- Language: French
- Budget: $6.1 million
- Box office: $2.9 million

150 Milligrams (French: La Fille de Brest, lit. The Girl of Brest) is a 2016 French drama film directed by Emmanuelle Bercot. It was screened in the Special Presentations section at the 2016 Toronto International Film Festival. The film is based on the true story of French pulmonologist Irène Frachon, who became noted for her investigations of the serious side effects and deaths attributed to the diabetes drug Mediator, produced by French manufacturer Laboratoires Servier.

== Plot ==
Sidse Babett Knudsen portrays real-life whistleblower Dr. Irene Frachon, a specialist in pulmonology. The story is set in the university hospital in Brest, Northern France. The film opens with doctors performing open-heart surgery. Dr. Irene observes that the heart valves of a patient, Corinne Zacharria, appear severely damaged. This condition has been detected in multiple patients, all of whom consumed Mediator, a drug manufactured by the French pharmaceutical firm Servier, intended for diabetes treatment and weight loss.

Dr. Irene believes Mediator is causing the pathology. To confirm this, she requires evidence from a proper epidemiological study. Several of her colleagues collaborate on this, but the contribution of research scientist Dr. Antoine Le Bihan is especially significant. Their research findings strongly support Irene's hypothesis.

However, when presenting their findings to AFSSAPS, the French regulatory agency for health products, their research is intensely scrutinized by Servier's representatives, and they're unsuccessful in getting Mediator removed from the market. Despite feeling disheartened, Irene continues her fight, getting support from various individuals. She self-publishes a book on their research, with Servier attempting to halt its publication. Irene gets support from her family, a reporter from Le Figaro, Anne Jouan, an AFSSAPS member, Catherine Haynes, and an informant from CNAM, the national health insurance fund.

The investigation reveals around 500 deaths connected to the drug, predominantly women.

== Cast ==
- Sidse Babett Knudsen as Irène Frachon
- Benoît Magimel as Antoine Le Bihan
- Charlotte Laemmel as Patoche
- Lara Neumann as Anne Jouan
- Philippe Uchan as Aubert
- Patrick Ligardes as Bruno Frachon
- Olivier Pasquier as Arsène Weber
- Isabelle de Hertogh as Corinne Zacharria
- Gustave Kervern as Kermarec
- Pablo Pauly as Charles-Joseph Oudin
- Myriam Azencot as Catherine Haynes
- Eddie Chignara as Christophe Laugier
- Raphaël Ferret as Fred
- Christophe Meynet as David
- Gilles Treton as Yannick Jobic
- Élise Lucet as herself

== Reception ==
The Hollywood Reporter's Leslie Felperin cited the "outsize but empathic central performance" by star Sidse Babett Knudsen in the role of Frachon and the director's ability to handle the film's "intellectually rigorous storytelling" and many characters.

== Accolades ==
Award / Film Festival	Category	Recipients and nominees	Result
César Awards	Best Actress	Sidse Babett Knudsen	Nominated
César Awards	Best Adaptation	Séverine Bosschem and Emmanuelle Bercot	Nominated
Magritte Awards	Best Supporting Actress	Isabelle de Hertogh	Nominated
Lumière Awards	Best Actress	Sidse Babett Knudsen	Nominated

== See also ==
- List of films featuring diabetes
