= Dorothée Gilbert =

French ballet dancer

Dorothée Gilbert (born 25 September 1983) is a principal dancer with the Paris Opera Ballet.

== Career ==
- 1990-1995 Toulouse National Conservatoire
- 1995-2000 Paris Opéra Ballet School
- 2000 Joins the Corps de Ballet of the Paris Opéra
- 2002 Promoted to Coryphée
- 2004 Promoted to Sujet
- 2005 Promoted to Première Danseuse
- 2007 Nominated Etoile after a performance of Nutcracker (Nureyev) on 19 November
- 2026 Retires from the Paris Opera Ballet after a performance of Kenneth MacMillan's Manon on 15 October

== Awards ==
- 2002 Prix du public de l’AROP
- 2004 Prix du Cercle Carpeaux
- 2006 Prix Ballet 2000 (Cannes)
- 2006 Prix Léonide Massine (Positano, Italy)
- 2022 Best choreographic performer (Syndicat professionnel de la Critique Théâtre, Musique et Danse)

== Repertoire ==
Ashton La fille mal gardée: Lise (in first Paris Opéra production, 2007)

Balanchine Concerto Barocco; Liebeslieder Walzer (in first Paris Opéra production, 2003); Symphony in C; Jewels (Emeralds); Rubis; Tchaikovsky – Pas de deux; Les quatres tempéraments, Apollon Musagète, who cares;

P.Bart La petite danseuse de degas: rôle titre, la danseuse étoile

Béjart Serait-ce la mort?

Coralli et Perrot Giselle: title role

Cranko Onegin : Tatiana

Forsythe Pas./parts; Artifact Suite (in first Paris Opéra production, 2006); The Vertiginous Thrill of Exactitude

Kylián Nuages

Lacotte La Sylphide: Effie; Paquita: title role

Lander Etudes: Soloist

Benjamin Millepied Triade

Neumeier La Dame aux camélias: Manon Lescaut, Prudence (in first Paris Opéra production, 2006); 3ème Symphonie de Mahler : The Angel

Nureyev La Bayadère: Gamzatti; Third Variation Nikiya; Swan Lake: Odette-Odile (Tokyo, 2007) Cinderella: Les soeurs Don Quixote: Kitri Nutcracker: Clara Raymonda: title role, Henriette

Petipa Sleeping Beauty : title role

R. Petit Carmen: Bandit woman; Proust ou les intermittences du coeur : Albertine

Robbins The Concert: Ballerina; En Sol

== First performances of new works ==
2002 Mi Favorita (José Martinez), Vevey (Switzerland) AndréAuria (Edouard Lock), Paris Opéra

2004 O’Zlozony / O Composite (Trisha Brown), Paris Opéra

2007 Donizetti Suite (Manuel Legris), tour to Japan Genus (Wayne McGregor), Paris Opéra

2011 Psyché (Alexei Ratmansky), Paris Opera

2021 Le Rouge et Le noir (Pierre Lacotte), Paris Opera

== Partners ==
Manuel Legris Liebeslieder Walzer, Etudes, Alles Walzer, Swan Lake, Paquita, Nutcracker, Nuages

Nicolas Le Riche La Fille mal gardée, Serait-ce la mort?

José Martinez Etudes, Raymonda

Hervé Moreau La Bayadère, Paquita, Eugène Onéguine

Benjamin Pech Etudes, Proust ou les intermittences du coeur

Jérémie Bélingard Paquita

Emmanuel Thibault Don Quixote

Alessio Carbone Giselle: Pas des Paysans, Tchaikovsky – Pas de deux, La Fille mal gardée (J.G. Bart), Rubis, Sleeping Beauty, Les quatres tempéraments;

Mathieu Ganio Artifact-Suite, Donizetti Suite, In G Major, Casse Noisette, La petite danseuse de Degas, Giselle

Mathias Heymann Giselle, Bayadère

Christophe Duquenne En Sol, Raymonda

Nicolas Paul Triade

== Tours ==
- 2001 USA (Paris Opéra)
- 2002 Brazil (Paris Opéra), Japan (Manuel Legris et ses Etoiles)
- 2003 Japan (Paris Opéra, Manuel Legris et ses Etoiles)

Cuba (19th Havana International Ballet Festival)

- 2004 China (Paris Opéra)
- 2005 Japan (Tokyo: La Traviata)
- 2007 Japan (Manuel Legris et ses Etoiles)
- 2009 Australia (Opéra de Paris)
- 2010 Japan (Opéra de Paris)

== Filmography ==
- 2015 Rise of a Star
