= Frantz (film) =

2016 drama film

- Film poster
- Directed by: François Ozon
- Screenplay by: François Ozon; Philippe Piazzo
- Based on: Broken Lullaby by Ernst Lubitsch
- Produced by: Éric Altmayer; Nicolas Altmayer; Stefan Arndt; Uwe Schott
- Starring: Pierre Niney; Paula Beer
- Cinematography: Pascal Marti
- Edited by: Laure Gardette
- Music by: Philippe Rombi
- Distributed by: Mars Films (France)
- Release dates: 12 July 2016 (Paris premiere); 7 September 2016 (France); 29 September 2016 (Germany)
- Running time: 113 minutes
- Countries: France; Germany
- Languages: French; German
- Budget: $11.1 million
- Box office: $6.3 million

Frantz is a 2016 drama film directed and co-written by François Ozon and starring Paula Beer and Pierre Niney. It is about a young German woman whose fiancé has been killed in World War I and the French soldier who comes bearing a secret about her fiancé. It was selected to compete for the Golden Lion at the 73rd Venice International Film Festival, where Beer won the Marcello Mastroianni Award. At the 42nd César Awards, Frantz was nominated in eleven categories, winning one for Best Cinematography.

Frantz is a loose adaptation of the 1932 Ernst Lubitsch film Broken Lullaby, which in turn was based on Maurice Rostand's 1930 French play L'homme que j'ai tué.

== Plot ==
In 1919 Anna, a young German woman living in the town of Quedlinburg, grieves over the death of her fiancé, Frantz Hoffmeister, who died during World War I. Leaving flowers at his grave, she sees fresh ones and realizes that these are from Adrien, a young Frenchman whom she doesn't know. Adrien goes to the home of Frantz's parents, Dr. Hans and Magda Hoffmeister; when Hans hears that Adrien is French, Hans says that a Frenchman killed his son, blames all French as murderers, and orders Adrien away. Adrien merely admits to Hans, "You are right. I am a murderer".

Meanwhile Anna is rejecting the unwelcome advances of an older suitor, Mr. Kreutz, particularly as she cannot forget Frantz. Anna sees Adrien at Frantz's grave and sends an invitation to the Hoffmeister home. After Anna tells the Hoffmeisters that Adrien was leaving flowers at Frantz's grave, they relent. Adrien visits and, upon questioning, tells them that he and Frantz were students together in Paris before the war. He recounts their last day together, when they visited the Louvre. Anna takes Adrien to the places she and Frantz used to frequent together, including the mountaintop where he proposed to her. Adrien, with his demeanour reminding them of Frantz, lifts Anna and the Hoffmeisters out of their despair. The Hoffmeisters ask Adrien, whose own career as a violinist was cut short due to hearing loss suffered during the war, to play Frantz's violin for them, as Frantz used to do. Adrien asks Anna to go to the local ball with him and she accepts. The appearance of a Frenchman at the ball draws negative reactions from the locals, especially Kreutz.

Increasingly unable to maintain the lie, Adrien confesses to Anna that he lied about being Frantz's friend in Paris before the war: they had actually met as enemy soldiers on the battlefield, face to face in a trench. With his gun unloaded because of his pacifism, Frantz was shot and killed by Adrien. Adrien found Frantz's last letter to Anna on Frantz's body and, racked with guilt, resolved to visit Germany in order to seek forgiveness. Anna, heartbroken, says that she will tell the Hoffmeisters so that Adrien does not have to. In reality, however, she decides that it is better for them to remain in ignorance of Adrien's role after they have come to like him and see him as a connection to their lost son. Adrien returns to Paris and Anna sinks back into despair, attempting to drown herself. She does not reply to Adrien's letters and destroys one he enclosed for the Hoffmeisters, in which he confessed the truth about Frantz's death. After being nursed back to health by the Hoffmeisters, Anna's spirits gradually recover and she decides to contact Adrien again; when Anna sends him a letter several months later, it is returned with no forwarding address.

Magda, who had encouraged a romance between the two, implores Anna to go to Paris to find Adrien. Anna eventually tracks down Adrien at his mother's estate and forgives him; he says he will never forgive himself. Anna also discovers that Adrien is about to enter an arranged marriage with a childhood friend, Fanny. Anna realises that the romance she had imagined developing between her and Adrien had been entirely in her head; all he had wanted from her was forgiveness. Anna kisses Adrien goodbye at the railway station and leaves. She continues writing to the Hoffmeisters as though she and Adrien were now together. In reality, however, having been inspirited by Frantz's final letter to her, Anna is contentedly living her own life in Paris.

== Cast ==
- Paula Beer as Anna
- Pierre Niney as Adrien
- Ernst Stötzner as Doktor Hoffmeister
- Marie Gruber as Magda Hoffmeister
- Johann von Bülow as Kreutz
- Anton von Lucke as Frantz
- Cyrielle Clair as Adrien's mother
- Alice de Lencquesaing as Fanny

== Reception ==
=== Critical response ===
Frantz received generally positive reviews from critics. Ty Burr of The Boston Globe said, "Frantz is pleasurable slow going, developing its themes at an amble but with a measure of suspense, sympathy toward its characters, and a lasting faith in filmmaking craft." Peter Travers of Rolling Stone also gave praise, stating that "Francois Ozon's post-WW1 period piece about a German widow and a French soldier takes on xenophobic hatred that's as timely as Trump, making Frantz a film of its time ... and ours."

AlloCiné, a French cinema website, gave the film an average of 3.7/5, based on a survey of 33 reviews, indicating "generally favorable reviews". On review aggregator Rotten Tomatoes, the film holds a 91% approval rating based on 139 reviews, with an average rating of 7.4/10. The website's critical consensus states: "Frantz finds writer-director François Ozon thoughtfully probing the aftermath of World War I through the memories and relationships of loved ones left behind." At Metacritic, which assigns a rating out of 100 to reviews from mainstream critics, the film received a score of 73 out of 100, based on 28 critics, indicating "generally favorable reviews".

=== Accolades ===
Awards
Award	Date of ceremony	Category	Recipients and nominees	Result
Australian Film Critics Association	13 March 2018	Best International Film (Foreign Language)	Frantz	Nominated
Belgian Film Critics Association	7 January 2016	Grand Prix	Frantz	Nominated
Venice Film Festival	10 September 2016	Marcello Mastroianni Award	Paula Beer	Won
Venice Film Festival	10 September 2016	Golden Lion	François Ozon	Nominated
César Awards	24 February 2017	Best Film	Frantz	Nominated
César Awards	24 February 2017	Best Director	François Ozon	Nominated
César Awards	24 February 2017	Best Actor	Pierre Niney	Nominated
César Awards	24 February 2017	Most Promising Actress	Paula Beer	Nominated
César Awards	24 February 2017	Best Adaptation	François Ozon	Nominated
César Awards	24 February 2017	Best Cinematography	Pascal Marti	Won
César Awards	24 February 2017	Best Editing	Laure Gardette	Nominated
César Awards	24 February 2017	Best Sound	Jean-Paul Mugel, Alexis Place, Cyril Holtz, and Damien Lazzerini	Nominated
César Awards	24 February 2017	Best Original Music	Philippe Rombi	Nominated
César Awards	24 February 2017	Best Costume Design	Pascaline Chavanne	Nominated
César Awards	24 February 2017	Best Production Design	Michel Barthélémy	Nominated
National Board of Review	28 November 2017	Top Five Foreign Language Films	Frantz	Won

== Trivia ==
Édouard Manet's painting Le Suicidé is referenced and shown several times in the story.
