= Mélanie Thierry =

French actress and model (born 1981)

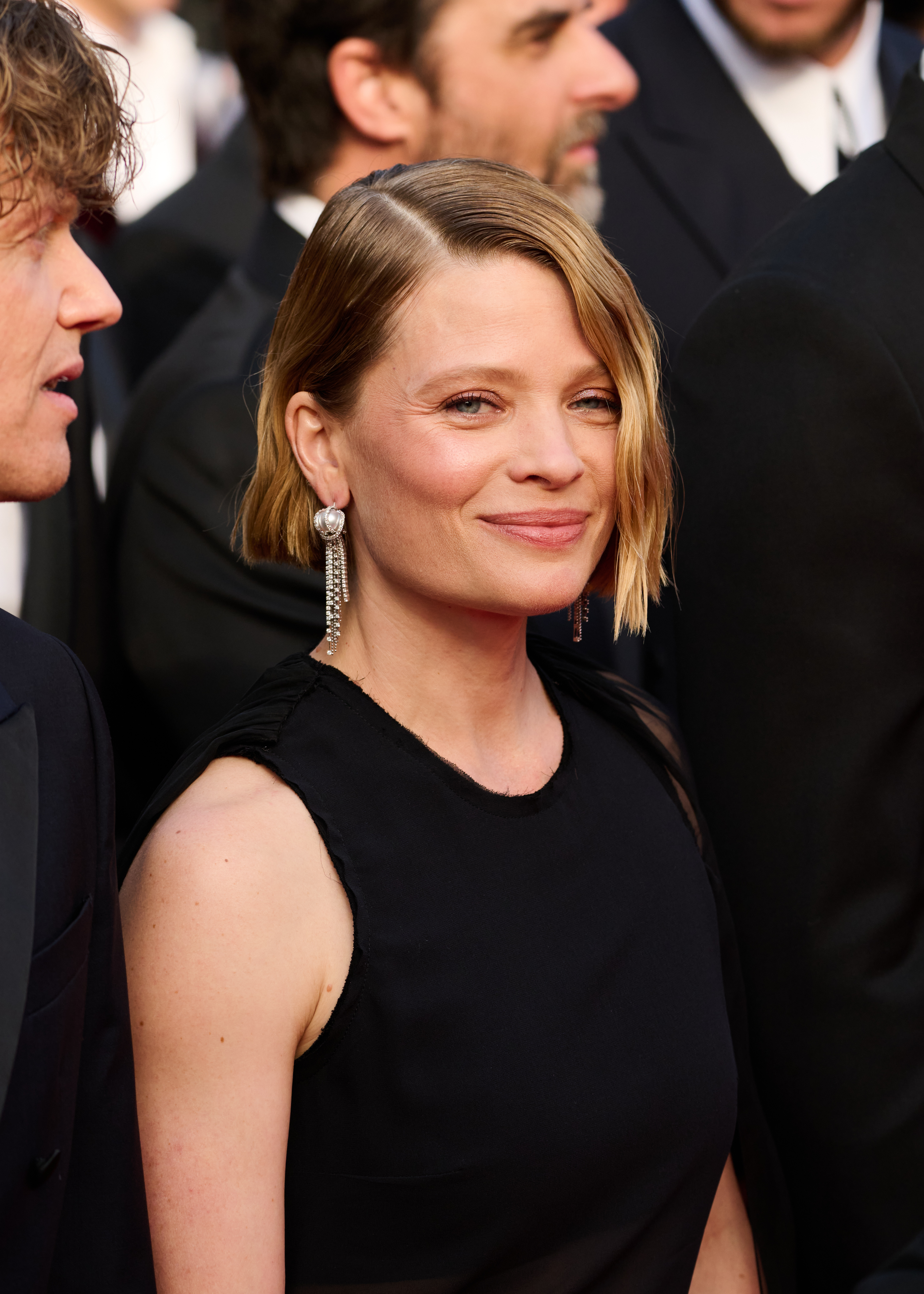
- Mélanie Thierry in 2025
- Born: 17 July 1981 (age 45); Saint-Germain-en-Laye, France
- Occupations: Actress, model, film director, screenwriter
- Years active: 1996-present
- Partner: Raphaël Haroche (2002-present)
- Children: 3

Mélanie Thierry (born 17 July 1981) is a French actress, model, film director, and screenwriter.

== Early life and career ==
Mélanie Thierry began her career as a model in France, then moved into acting. She began with a series of roles in French productions, and at the age of 17 appeared in the internationally distributed The Legend of 1900. She also appeared opposite Rufus Sewell in two episodes of the BBC costume drama Charles II: The Power and the Passion, playing the king's French mistress Louise de Kérouaille.

Thierry made her Hollywood début in the 2008 film Babylon A.D., as Aurora.

Mélanie Thierry has been the President of the 2021 Camera d'Or that awarded a first feature film selected at the Festival de Cannes.

== Filmography ==
Year	Title	Role	Notes
1996	L'amerloque (Yankee)	Henriette	TV-film
1998	The Legend of 1900	The Girl	English language
1999	Quasimodo d'El Paris	Agnès / Esméralda	
2000	The Inverse Canon – Making Love (Canone Inverso)	Sophie Levy	Italian production, English dialogue
2002	Jojo La Frite (Jojo The Fry)		
2003	Charles II: The Power and The Passion	Louise de Kéroualle	a.k.a. The last King (BBC TV mini-series)
2007	Chrysalis	Manon	
2007	Pu-239	Oxsana	
2008	Babylon A.D.	Aurora	
2008	Largo Winch	Naomi	
2009	You'll Miss Me	Ornella	
2009	One for the Road	Magali	a.k.a. Le dernier pour la route César Award for Most Promising Actress
2010	Dumas (L'Autre Dumas)	Charlotte Desrives	
2010	The Princess of Montpensier	Marie de Montpensier	
2011	Unforgivable (Impardonnables)	Alice	
2012	Henry V	Princess Katherine	BBC Two film, part of The Hollow Crown
2012	Just Like Brothers (Comme des frères)	Charlie	
2013	Back in Crime	Hélène Batistelli	
2013	For a Woman (Pour une femme)	Léna	
2014	The Zero Theorem	Bainsley	English language film
2014	An Eye for Beauty	Stéphanie	
2015	A Perfect Day	Sophie	English language
2015	A Decent Man	Karine	
2016	The Dancer	Gabrielle	Nominated - César Award for Best Supporting Actress 2017
2017	See You Up There	Pauline	Nominated - César Award for Best Supporting Actress 2018
2017	Memoir of War	Marguerite Duras	
2018	With the Wind	Pauline	
2018	Afikoman	—N/a	Short film; as director and screenwriter
2020	Da 5 Bloods	Hedy	
2021	Tralala	Jeannie	
2021	La vraie famille (The Real Family)	Anna	Winner of Valois actress prize at the Festival du film francophone d’Angoulême
2023	L'établi (The Workbench)	Nicole Linhart	
2023	Captives	Fanni Devander	Won Best Actress Award at the 54th International Film Festival of India
2023	Suddenly	Laura	
2025	Connemara	Helene	Film adaptation of Mathieu's book
2026	A Woman's Life	Frida	
2026	The Diary of a Chambermaid	Marguerite Donnadieu	
2026	Le Faux Soir		
TBC	La chambre de Mariana (Mariana's Room)	Mariana	
