= Chabname Zariab =

Afghan writer, screenwriter and director

- Born: 1982 (age 43–44); Kabul, Afghanistan
- Citizenship: French
- Occupations: Author, scriptwriter, director
- Notable work: The Afghan Pianist (novel), To the Sound of Bells (short film)
- Mother: Spôjmaï Zariâb
- Awards: 2012 Mediterranean High School Award

Chabname Zariab (born 1982, in Kabul), is an Afghan writer, screenwriter and director based in Paris, France.

== Biography ==
Chabname was born in Kabul in 1982 and moved to Paris, France with her parents in 1991. She studied law and cinema and also learnt Persian. She was a burglary damage expert for an Insurance Company.

== Professional career ==
=== Publication ===
==== The Afghan Pianist ====
Chabname's first novel, "The Afghan Pianist" was originally a script written for the cinema. In this novel, Chabname tells about the childhood of a little girl, who moved from Kabul to France and grows up to return to Afghanistan to look for the boy she loved. The novel was published by Editions de l'Aube and Chabname is currently writing the continuation of the novel, which is supposed to take place between London and Paris. The novel was released on 6 January 2011. Chabname Zairab was voted by 1,241 high school students as the winner of the 2012 Mediterranean High School Award, which was organised by the Languedoc-Roussillon Region, in partnership with the Mediterranean Center for Literature and Languedoc-Roussillon Books and Reading, the Rectorate and the Regional Center for Pedagogical Documentation of the Montpellier Academy.

=== Filmography ===
==== To the Sound of Bells (Au bruit des bells) (2015) ====
This was a short film by Chabname, set in Tunisia and was produced in 2015 by The Ball Films, and was produced abroad by Godolphin Films SA and had the support of CNC and ARTE. It tells the story of Saman, a young Afghan prostitute (Bacha bazi), forced to dress up as a girl and dance publicly in front of men. He is forced to teach his successor Bijane (another boy), despite being envious of the boy, who could rob Saman of the feelings and the protection of his master. The Royal Society of Arts projected this film on 29 March 2010 and then on French channel Arte. This film won the Best Fiction Prize at the 2016 edition of the International Short Film Festival of Clermont-Ferrand.

==== The Camel Boy (2018) ====
This short film by Chabname, produced by Bien ou Bien Productions, tells the story of a little boy in a desert, who forcefully gets drawn into the business of camel racing; whose hope to unite with his mother again gives him the strength to find a place in the hostile environment.

==== Hizia ====
This short film by Chabname, produced by Punchline Cinema and Alta Rocca films, tells the story of a migrant farther hastily handing his most precious possession: his infant daughter, to a stranger as he is being chased by the police.
