= Toki Pilioko =

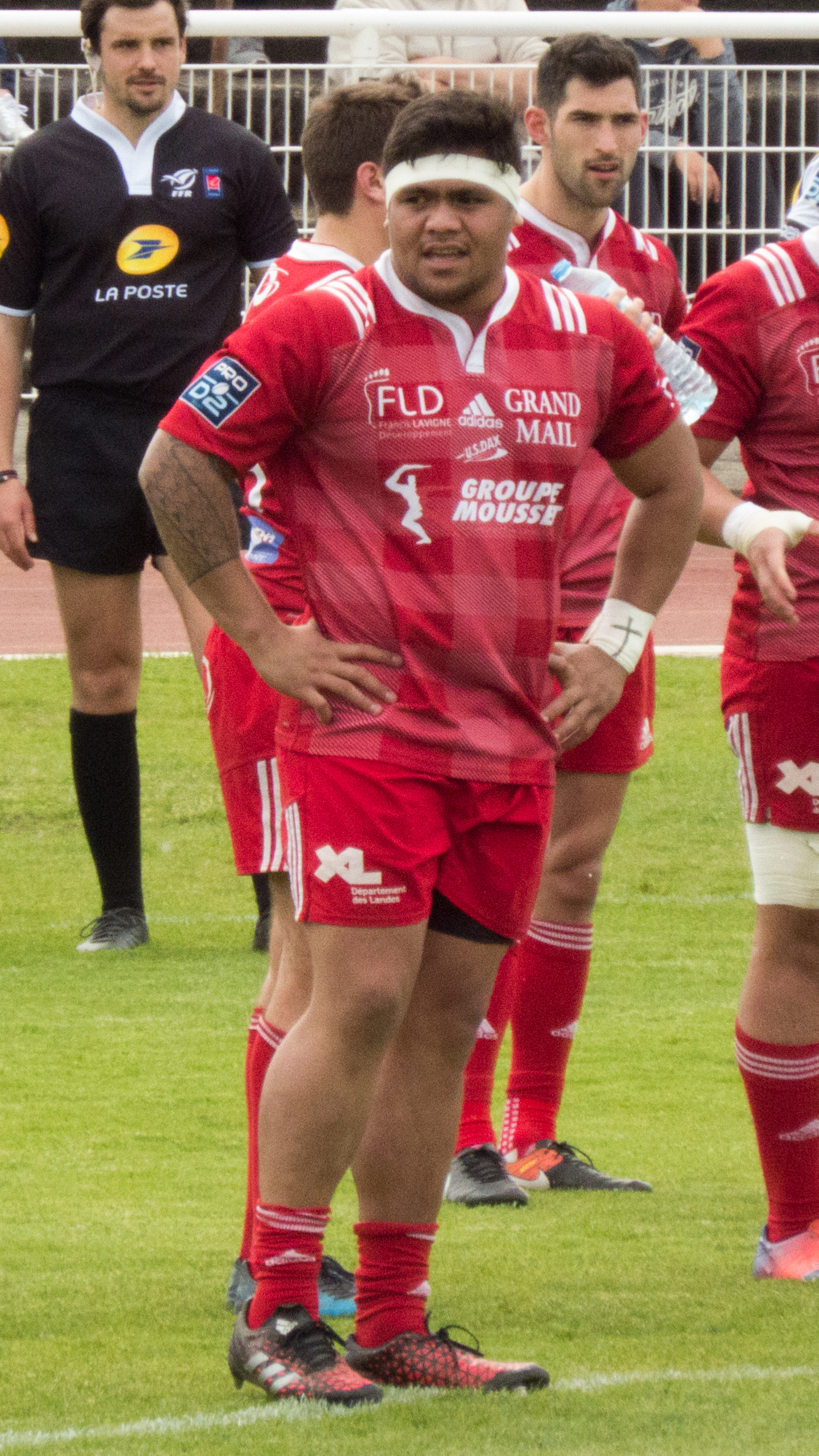
- Born: Toki Pilioko; 1 October 1995 (age 31) Nouméa, New Caledonia
- Height: 1.83 m (6 ft 0 in)
- Weight: 120 kg (18 st 13 lb)

Rugby union career
- Position: Prop
- Current team: UA Gujan-Mestras
Amateur team(s)
| Years | Team | Apps | (Points) |
- Olympique de Nouméa
| 2013–2017 | Aurillac | | |
Senior career
| Years | Team | Apps | (Points) |
| 2017–2020 | Dax | 23 | (0) |
| 2020–2021 | RC Bassin d'Arcachon | 3 | (0) |
| 2021– | UA Gujan-Mestras | | |
- Correct as of 25 Octobre 2020

Toki Pilioko (born 1 October 1995) is a French rugby union prop and actor. He currently plays for UA Gujan-Mestras in Fédérale 2.

== Acting career ==
Pilioko gained international success by interpreting a young man from the French oversea collectivity of Wallis and Futuna in the South Pacific who comes to play rugby in France in the 2016 film Mercenary. The film was screened in the Directors' Fortnight section at the 2016 Cannes Film Festival where it won the Europa Cinemas Label Award. Pilioko was also in the running for the César Award for Most Promising Actor.
