= Pierre Deladonchamps =

French actor (born 1978)

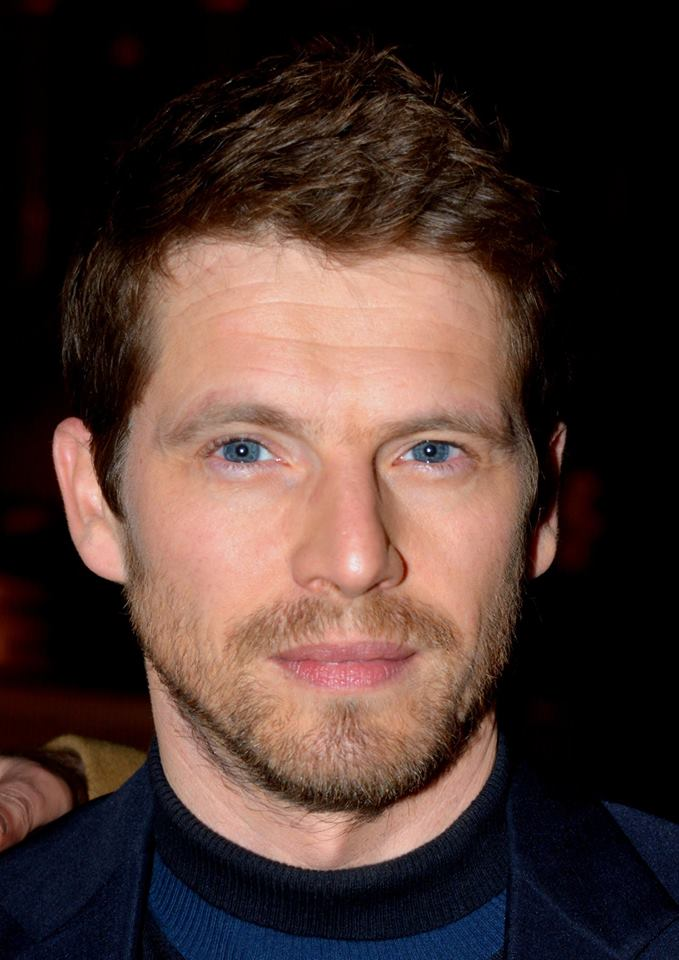
- Deladonchamps at the 2018 César Awards
- Born: 1 June 1978 (age 47); Nancy, Meurthe-et-Moselle, France
- Occupation: Actor
- Years active: 2004–present

Pierre Deladonchamps (born 1 June 1978) is a French actor. He is known for starring in the thriller film Stranger by the Lake (2013), for which he won the César Award for Most Promising Actor. He went on to receive a nomination for the César Award for Best Actor for his performance in the drama A Kid (2016). He received the Chevalier of the Order of Arts and Letters by the Government of France in 2015.

== Filmography ==
=== Film ===
Year	Title	Role	Notes
2008	Skate or Die	Policier en rollers	
2013	Stranger by the Lake	Franck	César Award for Most Promising Actor; Nominated—Lumière Award for Best Male Revelation
2014	À vif	Laurent	Short film
2014	La Conscience humaine: Le moi féminin		Short film
2014	All-Round Appraiser Q: The Eyes of Mona Lisa	Richard Bray	
2015	House of Time	Louis Legarec	
2015	A Childhood	Duke	
2016	A Kid	Mathieu	Nominated—César Award for Best Actor; Nominated—Lumière Award for Best Actor
2016	Eternity	Charles	
2017	Golden Years	Paul Grappe / Suzanne	
2017	Big Bang	Mao	
2017	Rise of a Star	Youri	Short film
2018	Sorry Angel	Jacques	
2018	Little Tickles	Gilbert	
2018	Le Vent tourne	Alex	
2019	Notre dame	Bacchus	
2020	Vaurien	Djé	
2021	Madame Claude		
2021	Eiffel	Antoine Restac	
2022	The Sitting Duck	Adjudant-Chef Brémont	

=== Television ===
Year	Title	Role	Notes
2004	Famille d'accueil	Stab	TV series
2008	SoeurThérèse.com	Martial Zeller	TV series
2008	Nicolas Le Floch	Jean de Langremont	TV series
2008	Spiral	Boussac	TV series
2009	Night Squad	Infirmier Rachid	TV series
2009	The Rebel, Louise Michel	Henri Bauer	TV movie
2010	Joséphine, ange gardien	Chevalier de Montaigu	TV series
2011	R.I.S, police scientifique	Cédric Roussel	TV series
2011	L'amour en jeu	Stan	TV series
2016	Trepalium	Ruben Garcia	6 episodes
2021	Voltaire High	Voltaire's chief supervisor	8 episodes
2024	"La Maison"	Victor Ledu	10 episodes

== Honours ==
- Chevalier of the Order of Arts and Letters (2015)
