= A Decent Man (2015 French film) =

- Theatrical release poster
- Directed by: Emmanuel Finkiel
- Written by: Emmanuel Finkiel
- Produced by: Christine Gozlan; David Poirot-Gozlan
- Starring: Nicolas Duvauchelle; Mélanie Thierry
- Cinematography: Alexis Kavyrchine
- Edited by: Sylvie Lager
- Music by: Chloé Thévenin
- Production company: Thelma Films
- Distributed by: BAC Films
- Release dates: 25 August 2015 (Angoulême); 24 February 2016 (France)
- Running time: 111 minutes
- Country: France
- Language: French
- Budget: $2.2 million
- Box office: $270,000

A Decent Man (original title: Je ne suis pas un salaud) is a 2015 French drama film written and directed by Emmanuel Finkiel. It stars Nicolas Duvauchelle and Mélanie Thierry.

After a violent street attack, Eddie accuses Ahmed, whom he's seen on the street some days before. But is he guilty, and is Eddie wrong...?

== Cast ==
- Nicolas Duvauchelle as Eddie
- Mélanie Thierry as Karine
- Driss Ramdi as Ahmed
- Maryne Cayon as Estelle
- Johann Soulé as Noam
- Nicolas Bridet as Régis Labrecque
