= Mercenary (2016 film) =

2016 film

- Film poster
- Directed by: Sacha Wolff
- Written by: Sacha Wolff
- Starring: Toki Pilioko
- Distributed by: Ad Vitam
- Release dates: 18 May 2016 (Cannes); 5 October 2016 (France)
- Running time: 112 minutes
- Country: France
- Language: French
- Budget: $83,000

Mercenary (French: Mercenaire) is a 2016 French drama film directed by Sacha Wolff. It was screened in the Directors' Fortnight section at the 2016 Cannes Film Festival where it won the Europa Cinemas Label Award. A young man from the French oversea collectivity of New Caledonia in the South Pacific plays rugby in France.

== Plot ==
Soane, a young rugby player, member of the Wallisian community of New Caledonia, defies the authority of his violent father, based outside Nouméa, to go play in France. He was recruited by an intermediary, Abraham, who exploits the emigration of Pacific island players to France by taking ten percent of their salaries. Unfortunately his arrival goes badly and he does not get a hoped-for player contract. Rejected by his father, he cannot return to New Caledonia and is threatened by Abraham who demands reimbursement of his expenses. On his own at the other end of the world, his odyssey leads him to become a man in a world that does not offer uncompromising support and success.

== Cast ==
This low-budget film used real life rugby players for its major roles.

- Toki Pilioko as Soane. Pilioko is in real life a Wallasian rugby player who left New Caledonia, with the support of his parents, to play in France in 2013.
- Iliana Zabeth as Coralie
- Mikaele Tuugahala as Sosefo. Mikaele Tuugahala is in real life a Wallasian rugby player who played in New Caledonia and France in the 1990s and 2000s.
- Laurent Pakihivatau as Abraham, the mafia agent. The actor is in real life an islander rugby player whose career in France finished in 2012.
- Petelo Sealeu as Leone Tokelau, Soane's father
- Omar Hasan as Angelo, the rugby player who sings the opera. Hasan was born in Argentina, became a rugby player before settling in France. and turning to singing.
- Philippe Rougé-Thomas as Noens. Rougé-Thomas is a former player and coach.
