= Slack Bay =

2016 film

- Theatrical release poster
- Ma Loute
- Directed by: Bruno Dumont
- Written by: Bruno Dumont
- Produced by: Rachid Bouchareb; Jean Bréhat; Muriel Merlin
- Starring: Fabrice Luchini; Juliette Binoche; Valeria Bruni Tedeschi
- Cinematography: Guillaume Deffontaines
- Edited by: Bruno Dumont; Basile Belkhiri
- Distributed by: Memento Films Distribution (France); Indigo Film (Germany)
- Release dates: 13 May 2016 (Cannes); 13 May 2016 (France)
- Running time: 122 minutes
- Countries: France; Germany
- Language: French
- Budget: $7.5 million
- Box office: $4.7 million

Slack Bay (French: Ma Loute) is a 2016 French comedy film directed by Bruno Dumont. It was selected to compete for the Palme d'Or at the 2016 Cannes Film Festival. Set on the north-west coast of France in the summer of 1910, with black humour and moments of absurdity the film depicts a confrontation between two families in the midst of a police hunt for missing persons.

== Plot ==
The van Peteghems, rich and inbred industrialists, are visiting their summer mansion above the Slack bay in Côte d'Opale. On the other side of the creek are the Bruforts, fisherfolk with an unusual diet who also ferry people across the bay. The police are investigating because several visitors to the bay have never returned.

The eldest son of the Bruforts, called Ma Loute, falls in love with Billie, the eldest van Peteghem girl. When he discovers she has male organs, in disgust he takes her to the family farm where they store their meat. There she is kept with her mother and uncle, also destined for the cooking pot. With three of the influential van Peteghems missing, the police call in the army. Ma Loute, maybe with some scruples, dumps the three captives in the dunes, where they are found and rejoin their family.

Ma Loute finds happiness with the van Petteghem's maid, who is working class and wholly female. The unfortunate Billie faces an uncertain future.

== Cast ==
- Fabrice Luchini as André van Peteghem
- Juliette Binoche as Aude van Peteghem, André's sister
- Valeria Bruni Tedeschi as Isabelle van Peteghem, André's wife and cousin
- Jean-Luc Vincent as Christian van Peteghem, Isabelle's brother and André's cousin
- Brandon Lavieville as Ma Loute Brufort
- Raph as Billie van Peteghem, Aude's incestuous daughter
- Didier Després as Detective Inspector Machin
- Cyril Rigaux as Detective Malfoy

== Release ==
The film premiered in competition at the 2016 Cannes Film Festival on 13 May 2016, and was released theatrically in France the same day.

== Reception ==
On review aggregation website Rotten Tomatoes, 64% of critics have given the film a positive review based on 81 reviews, with an average rating of 7.4/10. The website's critical consensus reads "Slack Bay won't resonate with all viewers, but for filmgoers attuned to absurd French farce, its slapstick chaos should deliver just enough belly laughs". On Metacritic, the film has a weighted average score of 66 out of 19 reviews, indicating "generally favorable reviews". On AlloCiné, the film received an average rating of 4.1 out of 5 stars, based on 25 reviews from French critics.

Andrea Picard wrote for Cinema Scope, "Ma Loute is a work of ludic imagination, harbouring the awesome sense of discovery that attended the age of mechanical reproduction, and thus the birth of photographic and cinematic images". Todd McCarthy of The Hollywood Reporter stated: "this beautifully made, bracingly eccentric and often arch film will generate a measure of strong support but will bewilder more.

Richard Brody of The New Yorker wrote that the film "teems with the eventfulness of a serial compressed into a two-hour movie, and its sense of distillation emerges in the wide range of performance styles that Dumont elicits-and the physical precision that marks each of them."

On the other hand, Nick James of Sight & Sound gave the film a negative review, writing "It’s full of surreal invention, and gorgeously shot, but you get the sense that Dumont, by letting his top-rank French cast go way OTT, traps himself in a vein of French comedy that’s an acquired taste at best". Jonathan Romney of Screen Daily wrote "This knowingly excessive brew of cartoonish knockabout and macabre comedy horror just isn’t that funny".

The French film magazine Cahiers du Cinéma ranked the film as the 5th best film of 2016.
