= Of Money and Blood =

2023 French television series

- Promotional poster
- French: D'argent et de sang
- Genre: Crime drama; Thriller; Serial drama
- Created by: Xavier Giannoli
- Written by: Xavier Giannoli; Jean Baptiste Delafon
- Directed by: Xavier Giannoli; Frederic Planchon
- Starring: Vincent Lindon; Niels Schneider; Ramzy Bedia; Judith Chemla; David Ayala; Olga Kurylenko; Yvan Attal; André Marcon; Victoire Du Bois; Matthias Jacquin; Lyes Kaouh
- Music by: Rone
- Country of origin: France
- Original language: French
- No. of seasons: 1
- No. of episodes: 12

Production
- Producers: Olivier Delbosc; Emilien Bignon; Christine de Jekel
- Cinematography: Christophe Beaucarne
- Editors: Cyril Nakache; Mike Fromentin
- Running time: 52 minutes
- Production company: Curiosa Films

Original release
- Network: Canal+ (France)
- Release: 16 October 2023

Of Money and Blood (French: D'argent et de sang) is a 2023 French crime drama thriller miniseries created, written and directed by Xavier Giannoli and co-directed by Frederic Planchon, based on the 2018 book D'argent et de sang by Fabrice Arfi about the 2008–2009 carbon tax fraud scandal in France. It stars Vincent Lindon, Niels Schneider, Ramzy Bedia, Judith Chemla, David Ayala, Olga Kurylenko, Yvan Attal, André Marcon, Victoire Du Bois, Matthias Jacquin and Lyes Kaouh.

The miniseries made its world premiere at the 2023 Venice Film Festival out of competition on 31 August 2023, and was later broadcast by French network Canal+ on 16 October 2023.

== Cast ==
- Vincent Lindon as Simon Weynachter
- Niels Schneider as Jérôme Attias
- Ramzy Bedia as Alain Fitoussi
- Judith Chemla as Annabelle Attias-Frydman
- David Ayala as Bouli
- Olga Kurylenko as Julia
- Yvan Attal as Anton Zagury
- André Marcon as Ilan Frydman
- Victoire Du Bois as Émilie Weynachter
- Matthias Jacquin as Thomas Laffin
- Lyes Kaouh as Kallil
- Michaël Abiteboul as Frère Bouli

== Production ==
=== Development ===
The project was announced in August 2019. Vincent Lindon was the first actor to be announced in the cast. The working title was Tikkoun. The screenplay was written by Xavier Giannoli and Jean Baptiste Delafon, based on the 2018 book D'argent et de sang by journalist Fabrice Arfi about the 2008–2009 carbon tax fraud scandal which resulted in a major tax shortfall in France and was dubbed "the fraud of the century" by the press. Of Money and Blood marks the first television series for both Giannoli and Lindon.

The series was produced by Curiosa Films. The budget was €30 million ($28 million). Canal+ bought the rights to Arfi's book and financed 50% of the development costs.

The character Jérôme Attias was inspired by French businessman Arnaud Mimran and would be played by Gaspard Ulliel, who had already started filming the series and was pictured on the set in December 2021. Ulliel was on a break from shooting Of Money and Blood when he died from a head injury on 19 January 2022–after a skiing accident on the previous day. The production still had 84 more days left of filming and Ulliel was expected to return to the set on 24 January 2022. Filming was suspended following Ulliel's death.

The character Alain Fitoussi, portrayed by Ramzy Bedia, was inspired by Mimran's friend, Mardoché Mouly, also known as Marco Mouly.

Initially, Giannoli wanted to stop shooting the series and throw away months of work after Ulliel's death. He later changed his mind and started looking for a replacement for Ulliel. On 18 February 2022, Canal+ confirmed to France's Le HuffPost that actor Niels Schneider would replace Ulliel in the miniseries. Ulliel and Schneider were friends and co-stars in the films One Nation, One King (2018) and Sibyl (2019).

In an interview with French magazine Femina in April 2022, Schneider said he was skeptical when Giannoli offered him the role, because Ulliel's death had brought back memories of what he had experienced with the death of his brother, who also died young and violently in an accident, and it took him a long time to put his brother's death at a distance, but everything came back to him after Ulliel's death. It was meeting Giannoli that convinced him to take on the role. Schneider said Giannoli was "destroyed" and had thought about quitting the series after Ulliel's death, but that he knew how to find the right words and told Schneider that they also practice this profession "to ward off death and tragedy". Schneider asked for a week of reflection before accepting the role. His partner Virginie Efira encouraged him to accept it. Following Schneider's casting, filming resumed in April 2022. Ulliel and Schneider had the same height and the same measurements, and for that reason Schneider ended up wearing the same costumes that had been worn by Ulliel in the beginning of filming.

=== Filming ===
Principal photography began on 16 October 2021. After a pause in January 2022 following Ulliel's death, filming resumed in April 2022 and wrapped on 22 October 2022. Filming took place in Cyprus, Paris, Provence-Alpes-Côte d’Azur, Israel, Manila and Philippines.

== Release ==
All of the 12 episodes of Of Money and Blood made their world premiere to favorable reviews at the 2023 Venice Film Festival out of competition on 31 August 2023, before being broadcast by French network Canal+ on 16 October 2023.

The series will be distributed internationally by StudioCanal. Canal+ holds distribution rights in Poland, Africa, Myanmar and Vietnam.

== Accolades ==
Year	Award	Category	Recipient(s)	Result	Ref.
2024	Paris Film Critics Association Awards	Best TV Series	Xavier Giannoli	Won	
2024	French Association of Series Critics Awards	Best Series	Of Money and Blood	Nominated	
2024	French Association of Series Critics Awards	Best Director	Xavier Giannoli, Frédéric Planchon	Nominated	
2024	French Association of Series Critics Awards	Best Screenplay	Xavier Giannoli, Jean-Baptiste Delafon	Nominated	
2024	French Association of Series Critics Awards	Best Production	Olivier Delbosc, Émilien Bignon, Christine de Jekel for Curiosa Films	Nominated	
2024	French Association of Series Critics Awards	Best Supporting Actor	Niels Schneider	Nominated	
2024	French Association of Series Critics Awards	Best Supporting Actor	Ramzy Bedia	Won	
2024	French Association of Series Critics Awards	Best Score	Rone	Won	
2025	French Society of Cinematographers Awards	Best Cinematography for a Series	Christophe Beaucarne	Won	
