= List of awards and nominations received by Justine Triet =

Justine Triet awards and nominations
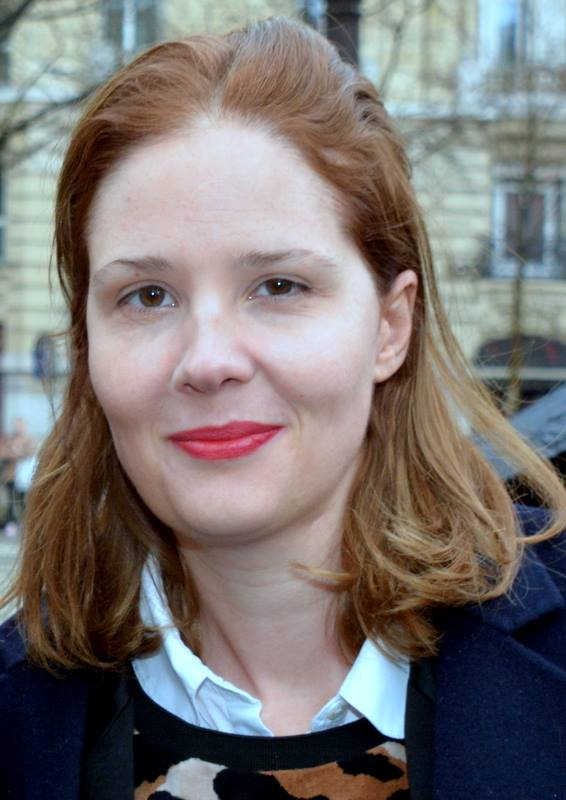
- Triet in 2017
Awards and nominations
Award	Wins	Nominations
Academy Awards	1	2
Cannes Film Festival Awards	1	3
César Awards	3	6
European Film Awards	3	4
Golden Globe Awards	2	3

Totals (Note: Certain award groups do not simply award one winner. They acknowledge several different recipients, have runners-up, and have third place. Since this is a specific recognition and is different from losing an award, runner-up mentions are considered wins in this award tally. For simplification and to avoid errors, each award in this list has been presumed to have had a prior nomination.)
- Wins: 70
- Nominations: 121

The following is a list of awards and nominations received by French filmmaker Justine Triet.

Triet's feature directorial debut, Age of Panic (2013), was presented as part of the ACID programme at the 2013 Cannes Film Festival, and was ranked number 10 on Cahiers du Cinéma's Top 10 List in 2013. As of 2024, Triet has been nominated for six César Awards and won three.

In 2023, Triet became the third female director to win the Palme d'Or at the Cannes Film Festival for her film Anatomy of a Fall. In 2024, Triet became the eighth female director and the first French woman to be nominated for the Academy Award for Best Director for Anatomy of a Fall, which also won her the Academy Award for Best Original Screenplay. The film also received a British Academy Film Award, three César Awards, four European Film Awards, and two Golden Globes.

== Major associations ==
=== Academy Awards ===
Year	Category	Nominated work	Result	Ref.
2024	Best Director	Anatomy of a Fall	Nominated	
2024	Best Original Screenplay	Anatomy of a Fall	Won	

=== BAFTA Awards ===
Year	Category	Nominated work	Result	Ref.
British Academy Film Awards
2024	Best Film Not in the English Language	Anatomy of a Fall	Nominated	
2024	Best Director	Anatomy of a Fall	Nominated	
2024	Best Original Screenplay	Anatomy of a Fall	Won	

=== Cannes Film Festival ===
Year	Category	Nominated work	Result	Ref.
2019	Palme d'Or	Sibyl	Nominated	
2023	Palme d'Or	Anatomy of a Fall	Won	
2023	Queer Palm	Anatomy of a Fall	Nominated	

=== César Awards ===
Year	Category	Nominated work	Result	Ref.
2014	Best First Feature Film	Age of Panic	Nominated	
2017	Best Film	In Bed with Victoria	Nominated	
2017	Best Original Screenplay	In Bed with Victoria	Nominated	
2024	Best Film	Anatomy of a Fall	Won	
2024	Best Director	Anatomy of a Fall	Won	
2024	Best Original Screenplay	Anatomy of a Fall	Won	

=== European Film Awards ===
Year	Category	Nominated work	Result	Ref.
2012	European Short Film	Two Ships	Nominated	
2023	European Film	Anatomy of a Fall	Won	
2023	European Director	Anatomy of a Fall	Won	
2023	European Screenwriter	Anatomy of a Fall	Won	
2023	European University Film Award	Anatomy of a Fall	Won	

=== Golden Globe Awards ===
Year	Category	Nominated work	Result	Ref.
2024	Best Motion Picture – Drama	Anatomy of a Fall	Nominated	
2024	Best Screenplay	Anatomy of a Fall	Won	
2024	Best Foreign Language Film	Anatomy of a Fall	Won	

=== Goya Awards ===
Year	Category	Nominated work	Result	Ref.
2024	Best European Film	Anatomy of a Fall	Won	

== Industry awards ==
Year	Film festival	Category	Nominated work	Result	Ref.
2023	British Independent Film Awards	Best International Independent Film	Anatomy of a Fall	Won	
2013	Cahiers du Cinéma	Cahiers du Cinéma's Annual Top 10 Lists	Age of Panic	10th place	
2023	Cahiers du Cinéma	Cahiers du Cinéma's Annual Top 10 Lists	Anatomy of a Fall	3rd place	
2024	David di Donatello	Best International Film	Anatomy of a Fall	Won	
2024	Dorian Awards	Non-English Language Film of the Year	Anatomy of a Fall	Won	
2024	Dorian Awards	LGBTQ Non-English Language Film of the Year	Anatomy of a Fall	Won	
2024	Dorian Awards	Screenplay of the Year	Anatomy of a Fall	Nominated	
2024	Dorian Awards	LGBTQ Screenplay of the Year	Anatomy of a Fall	Nominated	
2023	Gotham Independent Film Awards	Best Screenplay	Anatomy of a Fall	Won	
2023	Gotham Independent Film Awards	Best International Feature	Anatomy of a Fall	Won	
2024	Independent Spirit Awards	Best International Film	Anatomy of a Fall	Won	
2024	Jacques Deray Prize	Best French Policier Film of the Year	Anatomy of a Fall	Won	
2024	Lumière Awards	Best Film	Anatomy of a Fall	Won	
2024	Lumière Awards	Best Screenplay	Anatomy of a Fall	Won	
2024	Lumière Awards	Best Director	Anatomy of a Fall	Nominated	
2023	Prix Louis-Delluc	Best Film	Anatomy of a Fall	Nominated	
2025	Robert Awards	Best Non-English Language Film	Anatomy of a Fall	Nominated	
2024	Satellite Awards	Best Motion Picture – International	Anatomy of a Fall	Nominated	
2024	Satellite Awards	Best Original Screenplay	Anatomy of a Fall	Nominated	
2017	Trophées du Film français	Best Director/Producer Duo (shared with Emmanuel Chaumet)	In Bed with Victoria	Won	
2024	Trophées du Film français	Best Director/Producer Duo (shared with Marie-Ange Luciani, David Thion and Philippe Martin)	Anatomy of a Fall	Won	

== Festival awards ==
Year	Film festival	Category	Nominated work	Result	Ref.
2012	Altkirch KKO Short Film Festival	Jury Award	Two Ships	Won	
2012	Angers Film Festival Premiers Plans	Grand Jury Prize - French Short Films	Two Ships	Won	
2012	Berlin International Film Festival	Berlinale Shorts	Two Ships	Nominated	
2012	Berlin International Film Festival	Berlin Short Film Nominee for the European Film Awards	Two Ships	Won	
2012	Brive Film Festival	Prix Ciné+	Two Ships	Won	
2012	Cabourg Film Festival	Best Short Film	Two Ships	Nominated	
2012	Côté Court Film Festival	Press Award	Two Ships	Won	
2012	Côté Court Film Festival	Best Short Film - Fiction	Two Ships	Nominated	
2012	Entrevues Belfort Film Festival	Jury Award - Best Short Film	Two Ships	Won	
2012	Entrevues Belfort Film Festival	Audience Award - Best Short Film	Two Ships	Won	
2012	Guanajuato International Film Festival	Women in Film and Televisión Award	Two Ships	Won	
2012	Huesca International Film Festival	Best Short Film	Two Ships	Nominated	
2012	InDPanda International Short Film Festival	Best Short Film	Two Ships	Nominated	
2012	Kyiv International Short Film Festival	Best Director	Two Ships	Won	
2012	Milan Film Festival	Special Mention - Short Film	Two Ships	Won	
2012	Stockholm International Film Festival	Aluminum Horse - Best Short Film	Two Ships	Nominated	
2012	Winterthur International Short Film Festival	Best Short Film	Two Ships	Nominated	
2013	Paris Cinema International Film Festival	Audience Award	Age of Panic	Won	
2013	Mar del Plata International Film Festival	Best Film - International Competition	Age of Panic	Nominated	
2013	Tübingen-Stuttgart French Film Festival	Critics' Prize	Age of Panic	Won	
2013	Torino Film Festival	Best Feature Film	Age of Panic	Nominated	
2013	Zurich Film Festival	Golden Eye - Best International Feature Film	Age of Panic	Nominated	
2014	Göteborg Film Festival	Ingmar Bergman International Debut Award	Age of Panic	Nominated	
2019	Bucharest International Film Festival	Best Film	Sibyl	Nominated	
2019	Philadelphia Film Festival	Best Narrative Feature	Sibyl	Nominated	
2019	Seville Film Festival	Asecan Award - Best Film	Sibyl	Won	
2019	Seville Film Festival	Golden Giraldillo - Best Film	Sibyl	Nominated	
2019	Transatlantyk Festival	New Cinema - Transatlantyk Distribution Award	Sibyl	Nominated	
2023	Cinéfest Sudbury International Film Festival	Audience Choice for Best Feature Film	Anatomy of a Fall	Runner-up	
2023	Film Festival Cologne	Cologne Film Prize	Anatomy of a Fall	Won	
2023	Sydney Film Festival	GIO Audience Award for Best International Narrative Feature	Anatomy of a Fall	Won	
2023	Locarno Film Festival	Prix du Public UBS	Anatomy of a Fall	Nominated	
2023	Brussels International Film Festival	Grand Prix - International Competition	Anatomy of a Fall	Nominated	
2023	Brussels International Film Festival	International Competition - Audience Award	Anatomy of a Fall	Won	
2023	Festival international du cinéma francophone en Acadie	Best International Fiction Feature Film	Anatomy of a Fall	Won	
2024	Santa Barbara International Film Festival	Outstanding Director of the Year	Anatomy of a Fall	Won	

== Film critics awards ==
Year	Award	Category	Nominated work	Result	Ref.
2023	New York Film Critics Circle Awards	Best International Film	Anatomy of a Fall	Won	
2023	Los Angeles Film Critics Association Awards	Best Foreign Language Film	Anatomy of a Fall	Won	
2023	Washington D.C. Area Film Critics Association Awards	Best Foreign Language Film	Anatomy of a Fall	Won	
2023	Washington D.C. Area Film Critics Association Awards	Best Original Screenplay	Anatomy of a Fall	Nominated	
2023	Chicago Film Critics Association Awards	Best Original Screenplay	Anatomy of a Fall	Nominated	
2023	New York Film Critics Online Awards	Best Screenplay	Anatomy of a Fall	Won	
2023	St. Louis Film Critics Association Awards	Best International Film	Anatomy of a Fall	Won	
2023	St. Louis Film Critics Association Awards	Best Original Screenplay	Anatomy of a Fall	Nominated	
2023	Women Film Critics Circle Awards	Best Movie by a Woman	Anatomy of a Fall	Nominated	
2023	Women Film Critics Circle Awards	Best Foreign Film by or About Women	Anatomy of a Fall	Won	
2023	Dallas–Fort Worth Film Critics Association Awards	Best Foreign Language Film	Anatomy of a Fall	Won	
2023	Dallas–Fort Worth Film Critics Association Awards	Best Screenplay	Anatomy of a Fall	Runner-up	
2023	Toronto Film Critics Association	Best Director	Anatomy of a Fall	Runner-up (Note: Shared with Martin Scorsese for Killers of the Flower Moon.)	
2023	Toronto Film Critics Association	Best Original Screenplay	Anatomy of a Fall	Runner-up (Note: Shared with Celine Song for Past Lives.)	
2023	Dublin Film Critics Circle Awards	Best Director	Anatomy of a Fall	Runner-up	
2023	Dublin Film Critics Circle Awards	Best Screenplay	Anatomy of a Fall	Won	
2023	San Diego Film Critics Society Awards	Best Foreign Language Film	Anatomy of a Fall	Won	
2023	San Diego Film Critics Society Awards	Best Original Screenplay	Anatomy of a Fall	Nominated	
2023	Florida Film Critics Circle Awards	Best Foreign Language Film	Anatomy of a Fall	Won	
2023	Florida Film Critics Circle Awards	Best Original Screenplay	Anatomy of a Fall	Nominated	
2023	Alliance of Women Film Journalists	Best Director	Anatomy of a Fall	Nominated	
2023	Alliance of Women Film Journalists	Best Woman Director	Anatomy of a Fall	Won	
2023	Alliance of Women Film Journalists	Best Woman Screenwriter	Anatomy of a Fall	Nominated	
2023	Alliance of Women Film Journalists	Best Screenplay, Original	Anatomy of a Fall	Nominated	
2023	Astra Film and Creative Arts Awards	Best International Feature	Anatomy of a Fall	Won	
2023	Astra Film and Creative Arts Awards	Best International Filmmaker	Anatomy of a Fall	Nominated	
2023	Astra Film and Creative Arts Awards	Best Original Screenplay	Anatomy of a Fall	Nominated	
2023	San Francisco Bay Area Film Critics Circle Awards	Best Original Screenplay	Anatomy of a Fall	Nominated	
2023	Austin Film Critics Association Awards	Best Original Screenplay	Anatomy of a Fall	Nominated	
2023	French Syndicate of Cinema Critics	Best French Film	Anatomy of a Fall	Won	
2024	Belgian Film Critics Association	Grand Prix	Anatomy of a Fall	Nominated	
2024	Kansas City Film Critics Circle	Best Original Screenplay	Anatomy of a Fall	Won (Note: Tied with Celine Song for Past Lives.)	
2024	London Film Critics Circle Awards	Screenwriter of the Year	Anatomy of a Fall	Won	
2024	Minnesota Film Critics Alliance	Best Director	Anatomy of a Fall	Nominated	
2024	Minnesota Film Critics Alliance	Best Screenplay	Anatomy of a Fall	Nominated	
2024	Paris Film Critics Association Awards	Best Film	Anatomy of a Fall	Won	
2024	Paris Film Critics Association Awards	Best Original Screenplay	Anatomy of a Fall	Won	
2024	Paris Film Critics Association Awards	Best Director	Anatomy of a Fall	Nominated	
2024	Vancouver Film Critics Circle	Best Film	Anatomy of a Fall	Won	
2024	Vancouver Film Critics Circle	Best Screenplay	Anatomy of a Fall	Nominated	
2024	Gold Derby Film Awards	Best Original Screenplay	Anatomy of a Fall	Won	
2024	Gold Derby Film Awards	Best International Feature	Anatomy of a Fall	Won	
2024	Gold Derby Film Awards	Best Director	Anatomy of a Fall	Nominated	
