= Raghunath Manet =

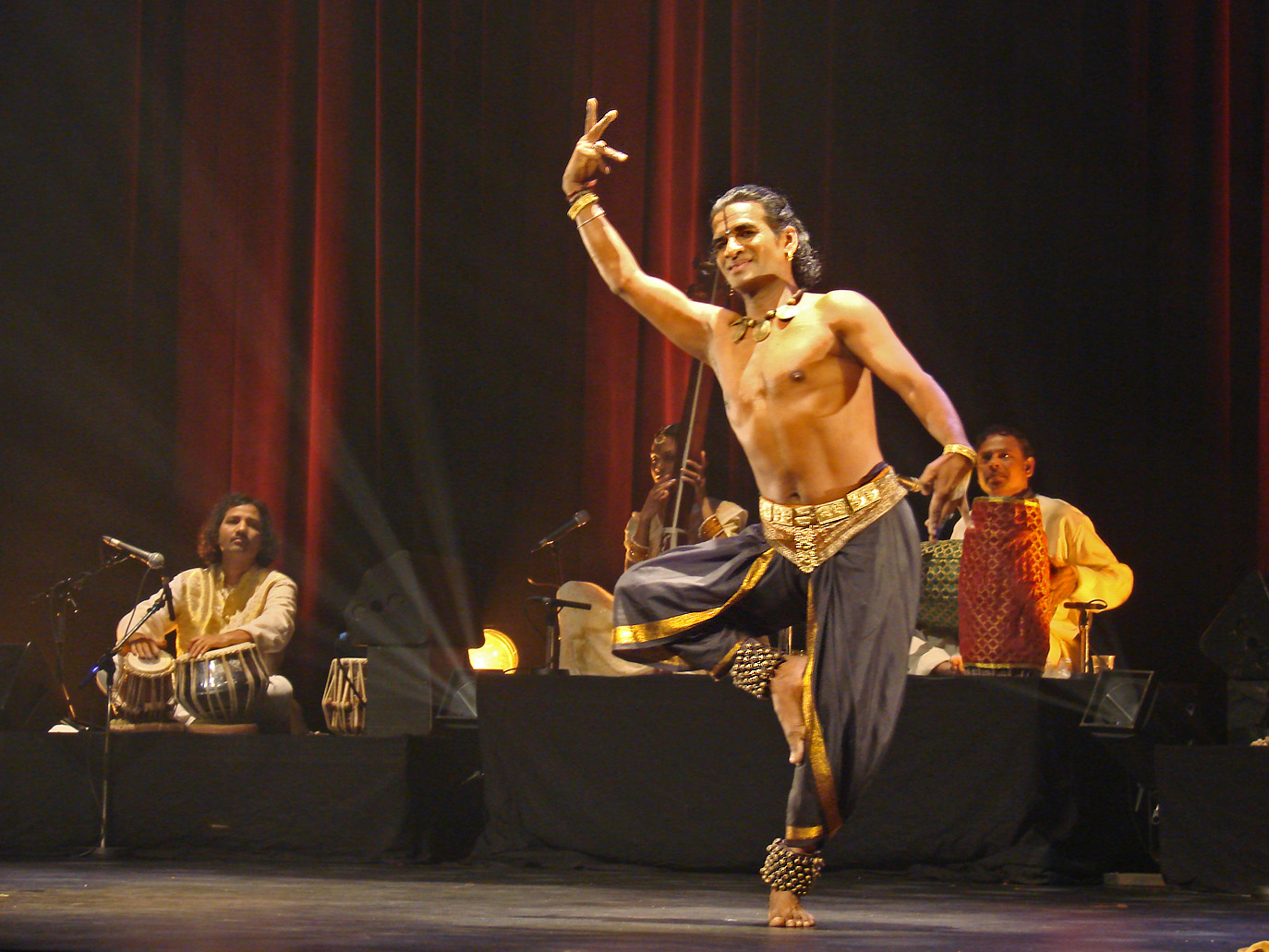
Raghunath Manet

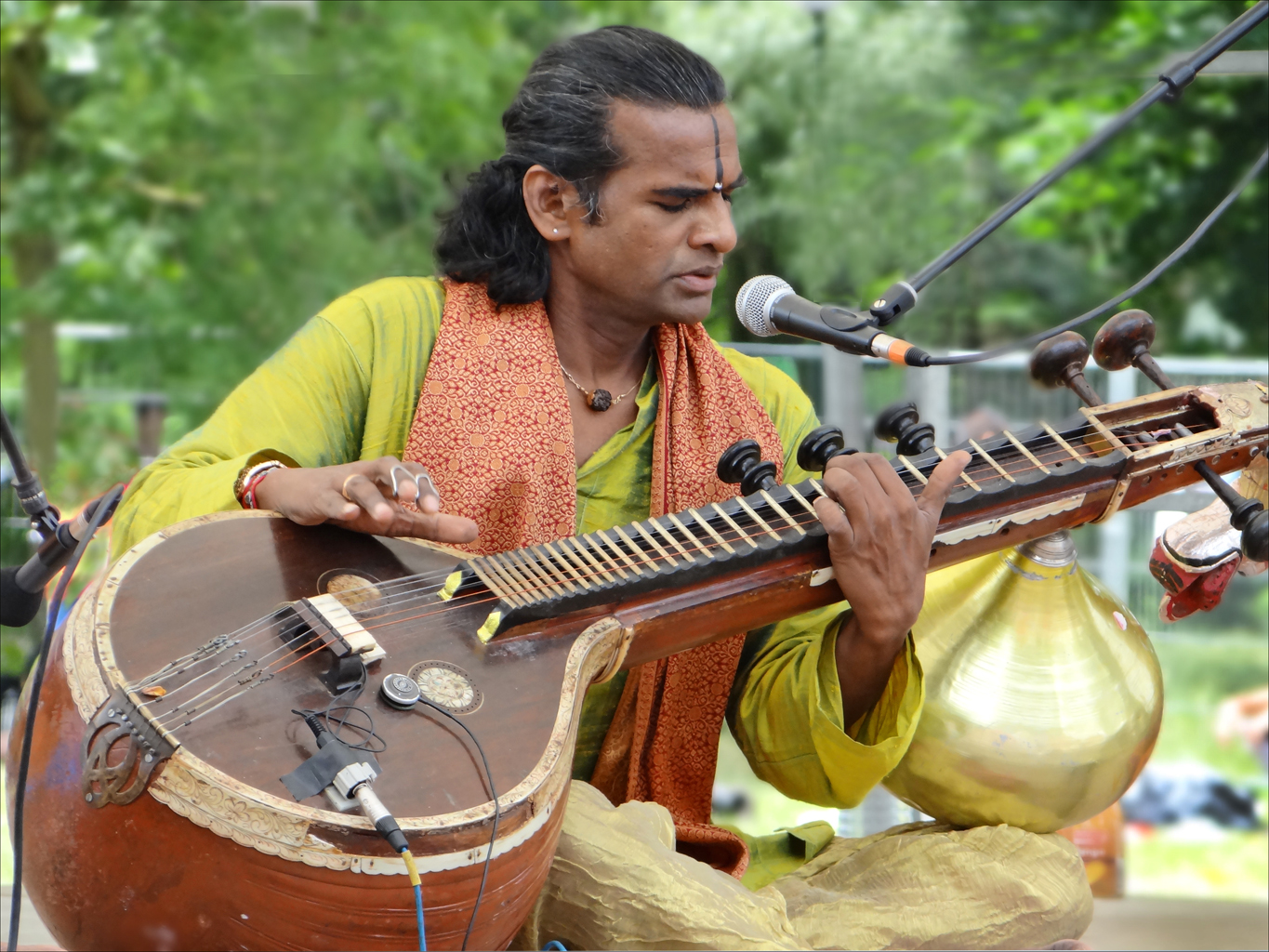
Concert with Raghunath Manet

Raghunath Manet is a French classical musician/music composer and dancer/choreographer, writer, film maker and actor, born in the Union Territory of Puducherry. He is trained in Bharathanatyam and plays the Veena, a Carnatic instrument. He has collaborated with Gilberto Gil, Aldo Brizzi, American Jazz musician Archie Shepp, American dancer Carolyn Carlson, French performers such as Richard Galliano, Didier Lockwood and Michel Portal and Indian musician Dr Balamurali Krishna and Drums Sivamani.

Raghunath Manet has performed all over the world. He has appeared at special events for Cartier, Louis Vuitton, Hermès, Chanel, Lagerfeld and other iconic brands. In 2017 Dr. Manet received the Pravasi Bharatiya Samman Award (PBSA) 2017 presented by the President of India during the Pravasi Bharatiya Divas celebrations in Bengaluru, recognizing Dr. Manet's contributions promoting Indian arts and culture in France. Other accolades include the "Officier des Arts et des Lettres" (2016) and the "Chevalier des Arts et des Lettres" from the French Ministry of Culture, the GOPIO Community Service Award in Jaipur, India (2011), and the Best Performer Award during the 2014 Chennai Music and Dance Festival. In 2023, Raghunath received the "Kalaimamani Award" from the Government of Pondicherry.

Raghunath Manet has acted in several films: Noni, le fruit de l'espoir by Alain Williams with Robert Hossein, Diamant Noir by Arthur Harari, Le journal d'un séducteur by Daniel Dubroux with Jean-Pierre Léaud and Chiara Mastroianni, and Perduto Amor by Franco Battiato. His work as a filmmaker includes "Dance of Shiva" (documentary film 1H15mn), "Karma" (short film), "Yoga, the 7th Chakra" (short film), "The Bayadères of Pondicherry" (documentary film) and "Réincarnation/rebirth" (mobile phone film). Raghunath is completing his fiction film RETOUR A PONDICHÉRY, BACK TO PONDICHERY.

== Performances ==
- 2022 : performed in Amor Azul with Gilberto Gil & Aldo Brizzi
- 2021 : Festival de Robion "Goita Govinda"
- 2020 : Temple to Stage for Monte-Carlo Sporting Club Awards
- 2017: Veena Concert au Petit Palais-Paris
- 2016: duo with Jérôme Pinget
- 2014: duo with Jasser Haj Youssef
- 2013: duo with Dr Balamurali Krishna
- 2012: duo with Didier Lockwood
- 2011: duo with Richard Galliano
- 2011: duo with Didier Lockwood
- 2008 (New Morning Paris): Dance & Indian music with Archie Shepp
- 2007: Tri Murti ou 7 Dances of Shiva, création with Michel Portal
- 2006: duo with Carolyn Carlson "Lille 3000"
- 2005: Bollywood Ballet festival d'Avignon
- 2004: album Karnatik with Dr Balamurali Krishna (MK2)
- 2003: Pondichéry, with Indra Rajan in Opéra-Bastille.

== Filmography ==
- Dance of Shiva, movie of Raghunath Manet and Didier Bellocq (2018)
- Karma, short film of Raghunath Manet and Ashok (2017)
- Perduto amor, movie of Franco Battiato (2003)
- Pondichéry, dance & music
- Chidambaram, Raghunath Manet & l'Opéra-Bastille
- Veena Concert "Evening Ragas"
- Omkara, dance & music with Didier Lockwood
- Dance of Shiva, 1st documentary film by Raghunath Manet & Didier Bellocq presented in Festival of Cannes 2013

== Discography ==
- Veena Dreams, Raghunath Manet, 2022
- "Holos", Raghunath Manet & Aldo Brizzi, 2020
- Karma, Music of Veena - Raghunath Manet 2017
- Tanjore, Raghunath Manet - 2015
- Babaji Dreams, with Drunms Sivamani & Raghunath Manet 2014
- Great Maestros of India, Music of Veena - Raghunath Manet - 2013
- Devadasi, Music of bharata natyam - Raghunath Manet - 2012
- Omkara, Raghunath Manet & Didier Lockwood - Dreyfus 2010
- Karnatic, with Dr Balamurali Krishna & Raghunath Manet 2009
- Bollywood Ballet, Raghunath Manet - Dreyfus 2006
- Anjali, Music of bharata natyam - Raghunath Manet - 2005
- Kuravane, Music of bharata natyam - Raghunath Manet - 2004
- Karaikkudi, Raghunath Manet chez M10 2000
- Shiva, Music of bharata natyam - Raghunath Manet - M10 2000
- Pondichéry, Raghunath Manet - Frémaux 1997
- Veena Recital II, (Double Album) Raghunath Manet / Frémaux 1996
- Music & Dance, (Double Album) Raghunath Manet Frémaux 1995
- Veena Recital I, Raghunath Manet (Double Album CD) 1994- Night & Day

+ 14 CD Raghunath veena

== Books ==
- Ode au dieu bleu (translation of the Gita Govinda), Editions "Tala Sruti" (préface Aldo Brizzi) 2022
- L'Inde en Guadeloupe Editions "Tala Sruti" (preface by Jean Hira) 2018
- Shiva et ses 7 danses Editions "Tala Sruti" (preface by Jean-Claude Carrière)- 2011
- La musique carnatique, preface by Didier Lockwood-Barbizon fev 2001
- Du temple à la scène Editions "Tala Sruti" (Preface Carolyn Carlson) 1999
- Les Bayadères du temple de Villenour Editions "Tala Sruti" (preface by Alain Danielou)1993.

== Awards ==
- Pravasi Bharatiya Samman 2017, Dr Raghunath Manet is conferred "Pravasi Bharatiya Samman Awards (PBSA) 2017" from the Hon'ble President of India for his contribution to promote Indian arts and culture in France.
- Officier des Arts et des Lettres, in 2016 from the French Ministry of Culture.
- Chevalier des Arts et des Lettres, in 2005 from the French Ministry of Culture.
- GOPIO Community Service Award, in 2011 from GOPIO America in Jaipur.
- Kalaimamani, in 2023 from the Government of Pondicherry.
