= The Unknown (2026 film) =

2026 drama film by Arthur Harari

- French theatrical release poster
- French: L'Inconnue
- Directed by: Arthur Harari
- Screenplay by: Arthur Harari; Lucas Harari; Vincent Poymiro
- Based on: Le cas David Zimmerman by: Lucas Harari; and Arthur Harari
- Produced by: Nicolas Anthomé
- Starring: Léa Seydoux; Niels Schneider; Valérie Dréville; Lilith Grasmug; Radu Jude; Shanti Masud; Jonathan Turnbull; Victoire Du Bois
- Cinematography: Tom Harari
- Edited by: Laurent Sénéchal
- Music by: Andrea Poggio; Enrico Gabrielli; Tommaso Colliva
- Production companies: Bathysphère; To Be Continued; Pathé; Logical Content Ventures; France 2 Cinéma; Ascent Film; Rai Cinema; Adler Entertainment; 2632-7197 Québec Inc
- Distributed by: Pathé
- Release dates: 18 May 2026 (Cannes); 26 August 2026 (France)
- Running time: 139 minutes
- Countries: France; Italy
- Language: French
- Budget: €12 million

The Unknown (French: L'Inconnue) is a 2026 psychological fantasy film directed by Arthur Harari, co-written with Lucas Harari and Vincent Poymiro, and loosely inspired by the graphic novel Le cas David Zimmerman, which Arthur co-wrote with his brother Lucas. It stars Léa Seydoux, Niels Schneider, Victoire Du Bois and Radu Jude.

The film had its world premiere in the main competition of the 2026 Cannes Film Festival on 18 May, where it competed for the Palme d'Or. It was theatrically released in France by Pathé on 26 August.

== Premise ==
David, a Parisian photographer, finds his life irreversibly changed after an encounter with an entity that forces its victims to swap bodies following sexual intercourse.

== Cast ==
- Léa Seydoux as Eva / David Zimmerman
- Niels Schneider as David Zimmerman / Malia
- Valérie Dréville as Gabi, David's mother
- Lilith Grasmug as Malia
- Radu Jude as Malia’s father
- Shanti Masud as Alice
- Jonathan Turnbull as Chris Caro
- Victoire Du Bois as Sophie
- Anne Rotger
- Alexandre Pallu

== Production ==
=== Development ===
In May 2024, it was announced that Léa Seydoux would be starring in Arthur Harari's third feature film The Unknown. Harari described it as a mixture of "realistic urban chronicle, fantasy film, investigation, melodrama and daydream". Harari wrote the role specifically for Seydoux after seeing her performance in Bruno Dumont's tragicomic satire France (2021). The film reunites Harari with Niels Schneider, who starred in the lead role in Harari's directorial debut Dark Inclusion (2016), and also stars stage actress Valérie Dréville.

Around the same time, Harari's young brother, Lucas, a bande dessinée author, sought his opinion on a story he had been working on. Lucas had spent several years working on the project and struggled to develop it, eventually appealing to Arthur to read it. Arthur initially advised him to write it with someone, but then told him the story obsessed him and suggested the two of them work on it together as a collaboration. Their graphic novel, Le cas David Zimmerman, was published in November 2024 by Éditions Sarbacane. It has been described as a "fantastical and psychological thriller" and follows a solitary photographer who, after meeting a strange woman at a New Year's Eve party and sleeping with her, inexplicably wakes up in her body. Lucas conceptualized the graphic novel as a departure from the conventional crude humor or cheap eroticism of the body swap genre. Lucas wanted to instead craft a dark and realistic story by focusing on the utter disarry of the victims of body swapping, inspired by Franz Kafka's The Metamorphosis and Jiro Taniguchi manga A Distant Neighborhood. From the outset, Arthur planned for there to be two forms to the story, a comic book and film, and began writing the film's screenplay immediately after he finished writing the graphic novel. In an interview with French magazine Télérama, Arthur said: "The Unknown is an outgrowth of the comic, rather than an adaptation. And since I need a great deal of time to conceive a film, my brother Lucas's pages left me little by little, in favor of my own images, my intuitions about rhythm and atmosphere."

Harari wrote the screenplay with his brother Lucas and Vincent Poymiro, who co-wrote Harari's previous film Onoda: 10000 Nights in the Jungle.

An independent film, The Unknown was produced by Nicolas Anthomé for Bathysphere. Anthomé, who produced Harari's previous film Onoda: 10000 Nights in the Jungle, secured a budget over 10 million euros for The Unknown, which is twice as high as the budget of Onoda, a film which Anthomé himself dubbed a "box-office flop". The film was co-produced with France 2 Cinéma, Pathé Films and by the Italian companies Ascent Film and RAI Cinema. It was pre-purchased by Canal+ and Ciné+, and received support from the Centre national du cinéma et de l'image animée (CNC) as well from the Ile-de-France and Pays de la Loire regions.

=== Filming ===
Principal photography began in March 2025 in Paris. Filming took place at numerous locations in the Grand Paris métropole said to be "rarely seen on screen before", and included a large number of extras. In May 2025, shooting took place in the Yvelines department, including in Conflans-Sainte-Honorine, and continued in the Pays de la Loire region, in the communes of Ingrandes-le-Fresne-sur-Loire and Mauges-sur-Loire, The Pont Ingrandes-sur-Loire, which connects the two communes, was used as a filming location. Filming wrapped by the end of May 2025.

Tom Harari served as cinematographer, marking his second collaboration with his brother, following Onoda: 10,000 Nights in the Jungle (2021).

=== Post-production ===
The film's editing process, which began in July 2025, was expected to last nearly nine months, the same length of time as the editing process of Anatomy of a Fall. Laurent Sénéchal, who also edited Anatomy of a Fall, served as the editor. In January 2026, Harari was said to be putting the "finishing touches" on the editing.

== Release ==
The Unknown was selected to compete for the Palme d'Or at the 2026 Cannes Film Festival, where it had its world premiere on 18 May. The film was also part of Horizons section of the 60th Karlovy Vary International Film Festival, where it was screened from 3 July to 9 July 2026. It had its North American premiere at the 53rd Telluride Film Festival. It was also selected for the Main Slate of the 2026 New York Film Festival, and for the Official Selection of the 23rd Seville European Film Festival.

International sales are handled by Pathé, which presented the film at the Marché du Film in Cannes to be acquired by distributors around the world. Pathé is also set to theatrically release the film in France on 26 August. Neon acquired North American rights to the film in May 2024, planning to release it sometime in 2026.

== Reception ==
=== Critical response ===
On the review aggregator website Rotten Tomatoes, 68% of 31 critics' reviews are positive, with an average rating of 6.10/10. Metacritic, which uses a weighted average, assigned the film a score of 60 out of 100, based on 13 critics, indicating "mixed or average" reviews.

=== Accolades ===
| Award | Date of ceremony | Category | Recipient(s) | Result | Ref. |
|---|---|---|---|---|---|
| Cannes Film Festival | 23 May 2026 | Palme d'Or | Arthur Harari | Nominated | |
| Prix Jean Vigo | 6 July 2026 | Best Feature Film | Arthur Harari | Won | |
