= Virginie Efira =

Belgian and French actress

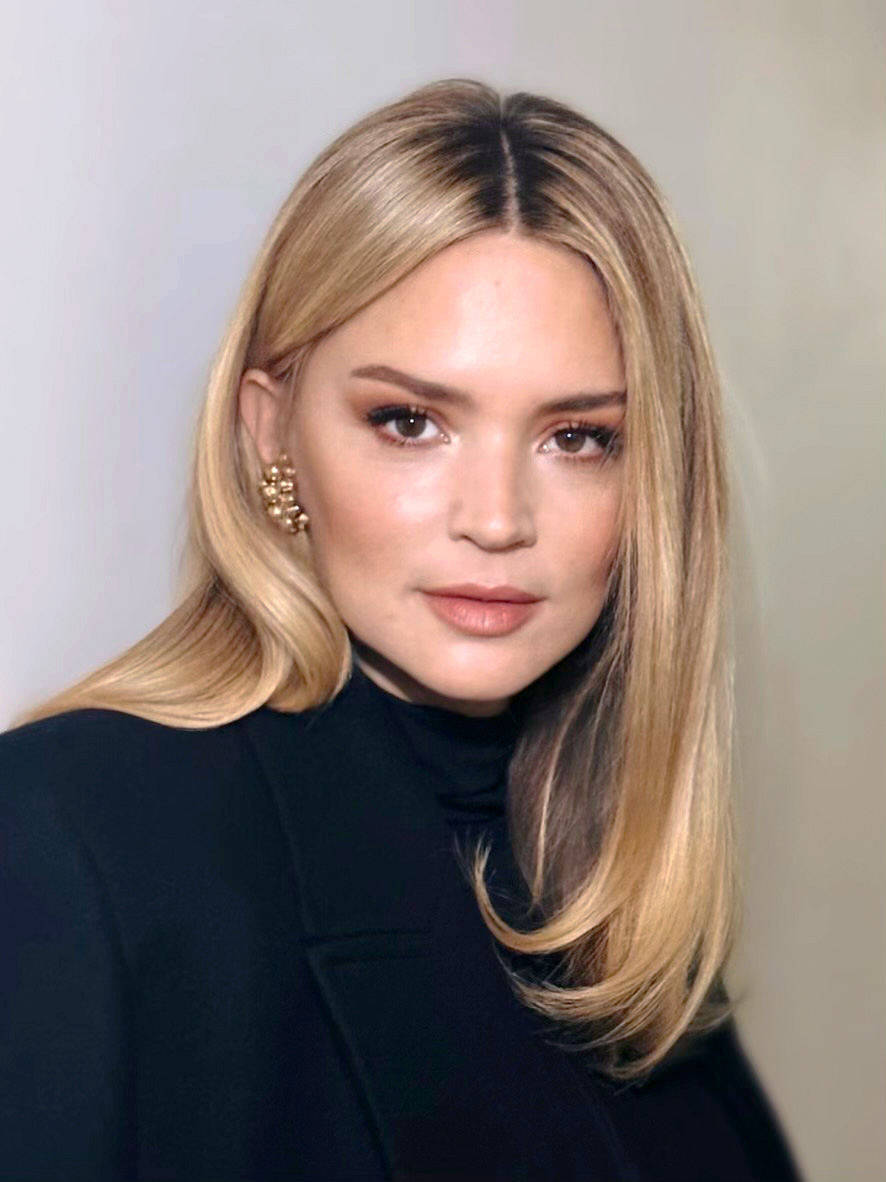
- Efira in 2023
- Born: 5 May 1977 (age 49); Schaerbeek, Belgium
- Citizenship: Belgium; France (from 2016)
- Occupation: Actress
- Years active: 1998–present
- Spouse: Patrick Ridremont (m. 2002; div. 2009)
- Partners: Mabrouk El Mechri (2012–2017); Niels Schneider (2017–present)
- Children: 2

Virginie Efira (born 5 May 1977) is a Belgian and French actress. She had her first leading role in It Boy (2013), and subsequently received praise for In Bed with Victoria (2016), for which she received a Magritte Award for Best Actress and her first César Award for Best Actress nomination.

She also starred in the psychological thriller Elle (2016), the comedy drama Sibyl (2019), the black comedy Bye Bye Morons (2020) and the psychological drama Benedetta (2021). In 2023, she won the César Award for Best Actress for Paris Memories (2022). For her performance in the drama All of a Sudden (2026) she won the Cannes Film Festival Award for Best Actress.

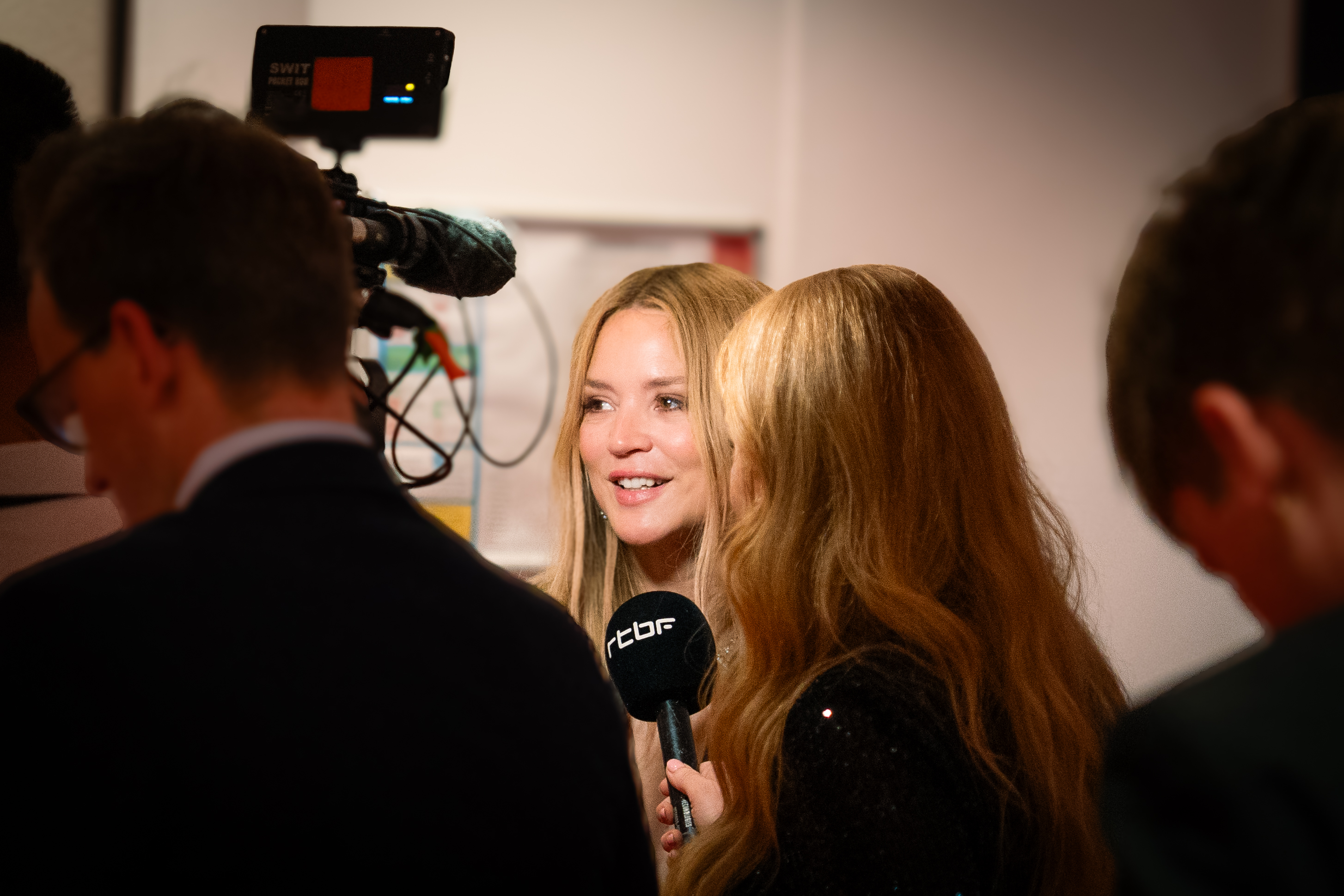
Virginie Efira, winner of the Best Performance by an Actress Award for “All Of A Sudden,” speaks during the Palme d'Or winners press conference at the 79th annual Cannes Film Festival at Palais des Festivals on May 23, 2026 in Cannes, France.

== Early life ==
Efira was born on 5 May 1977 in the Brugmann district of Brussels, Belgium, the daughter of Professor André Efira, a hemato-oncologist, and Carine Verelst. She has Greek-Jewish ancestry. Efira has three siblings. She grew up in Schaerbeek. Her parents divorced when she was 18 years old.

Efira studied Latin, maths, psychology and social sciences in Brussels. She moved to Paris at the age of 28.

== Career ==
=== 1998–2008: Television anchor ===
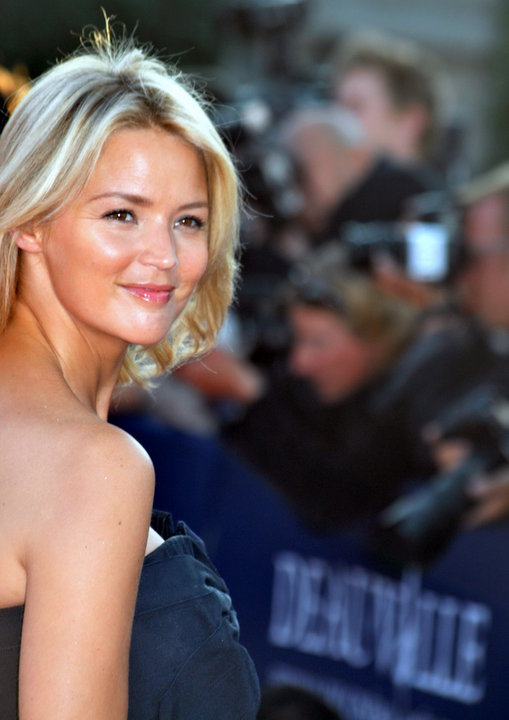
Virginie Efira at the Deauville American Film Festival in 2010

She was first hired by Club RTL (a Belgian TV channel in the RTL Group) to present a children's show called Mégamix. She went on to present other programmes in Belgium, including A la recherche de la nouvelle Star. In September 2002, she was offered the job of the presenter of Belgium's version of Star Academy.

After becoming a weather forecast presenter on the M6 channel in France, she soon became one of M6's main public faces, presenting shows such as Le Grand Zap, La saga des ..., Follement Gay, Absolument 80/90, Le Grand Piège and Drôles d'équipes. She was the host of Classé Confidentiel for one year, before replacing Benjamin Castaldi as the host of the popular musical reality show Nouvelle Star for the end of the show's fourth series. She also presented shows on RTL-TVi (a spin-off channel in the RTL Group).

=== 2004–2015: Early roles and romantic parts ===
Efira's film career began in 2004, appearing as Dr. Liz Wilson in the French-language version of Garfield: The Movie, as well as playing Piper in the French version of the 2005 film Robots. She also voiced the characters of Kitty Softpaws in Puss in Boots and Mavis in Hotel Transylvania (2012) and Hotel Transylvania 2 (2015). Efira also guest-starred in two episodes of the highly successful French show Kaamelott.

In 2010, she participated in Rendez-vous en terre inconnue. Efira next had a supporting role as a social worker in the comedy drama My Worst Nightmare (2011) directed by Anne Fontaine, opposite Isabelle Huppert, Benoît Poelvoorde and André Dussollier. The following year, she won the Audience Award at the 2nd Magritte Awards.

In 2013, Efira starred alongside Pierre Niney in the romantic comedy It Boy, about a 38-year-old woman and her relationship with a teenage boy. The film was highly successful in France and received positive reviews. Variety wrote that she "has a particular talent for transmitting thoughts and eliciting laughs using facial expressions alone, a gift that gets another glorious workout here".

=== 2016–2021: Expansion to dramatic roles ===
In 2016, Efira starred in Justine Triet's romantic comedy-drama In Bed with Victoria, which premiered in the International Critics' Week section of the 2016 Cannes Film Festival. Her performance received critical acclaim, with The Hollywood Reporter describing it as "vibrant" and "well-tuned", and earned her the Magritte Award for Best Actress as well as her first César Award for Best Actress nomination. That same year, she appeared alongside Isabelle Huppert in Paul Verhoeven's psychological thriller Elle. Following the success of both films, Efira increasingly took on more ambitious dramatic roles.

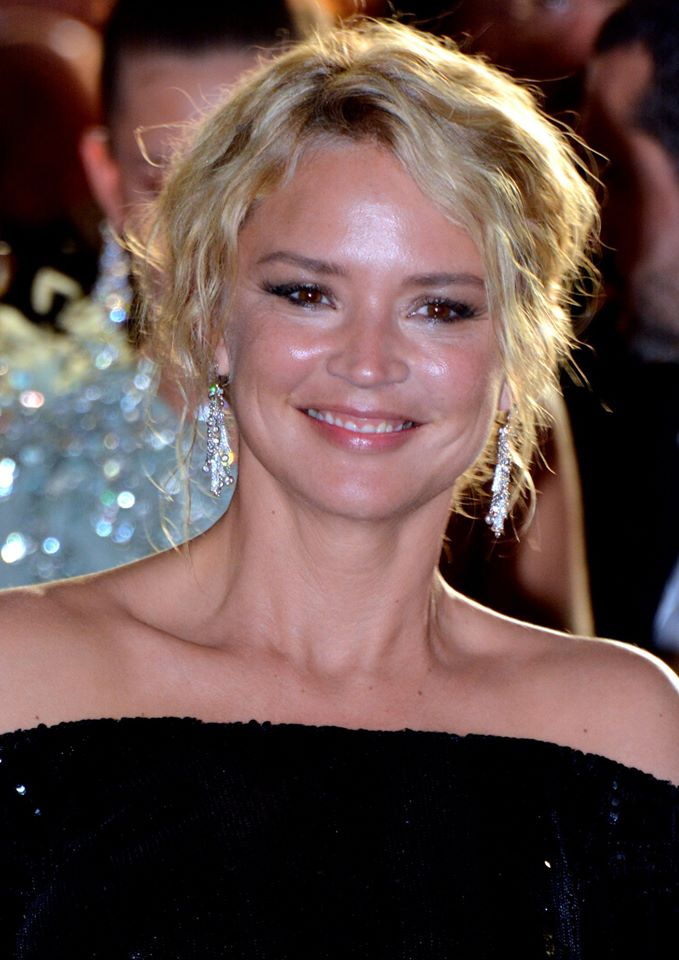
Virginie Efira in 2019

In 2018, she starred in Catherine Corsini's drama An Impossible Love, portraying a woman over more than three decades of her life. Her performance was widely praised, earning Cesar Award, Globe de Cristal Award and Lumière Award nominations for Best Actress. That same year, Efira appeared in the ensemble comedy Sink or Swim, which was screened out of competition at the 2018 Cannes Film Festival, earning her a César Award nomination for Best Supporting Actress.

Efira continued her collaboration with acclaimed French auteurs in Sibyl, her second film with Justine Triet. Premiering in competition at the 2019 Cannes Film Festival, the film further established her as one of France's leading dramatic actresses, with Variety describing her as "a first-class leading lady of consistently expanding range and elan". In 2020, Efira starred as a terminally ill hairdresser seeking to reunite with her long-lost child in Albert Dupontel's comedy-drama Bye Bye Morons. The film became a major commercial and critical success in France, winning seven César Awards, including Best Film, and earning Efira her third nomination for Best Actress.

In 2021, Efira reunited with Paul Verhoeven for the title role in the historical drama Benedetta, portraying the 17th-century Italian nun whose mystical visions and forbidden relationship with another nun challenge religious authority.

=== 2022–present: Established career ===
In 2023, Efira won her first César Award for Best Actress, for her performance in the film Paris Memories (2022), in which she played a woman who is struggling with the lingering mental health effects of having survived a terrorist attack in Paris, a role originally intended for Nicole Kidman. Her performance in Rebecca Zlotowski's drama Other People's Children (2022) earned her high praise from critics. The Hollywood Reporter called it "a career-best turn" and "her best work yet as a woman who, compared to the usual Parisian narcissists and neurotics, is a model of selflessness." Also in 2023, Efira continued to work with female French filmmakers and had two films premiere at the Cannes Film Festival: the psychological drama Just the Two of Us, for which she earned her sixth César Award for Best Actress nomination, and the drama All to Play For.

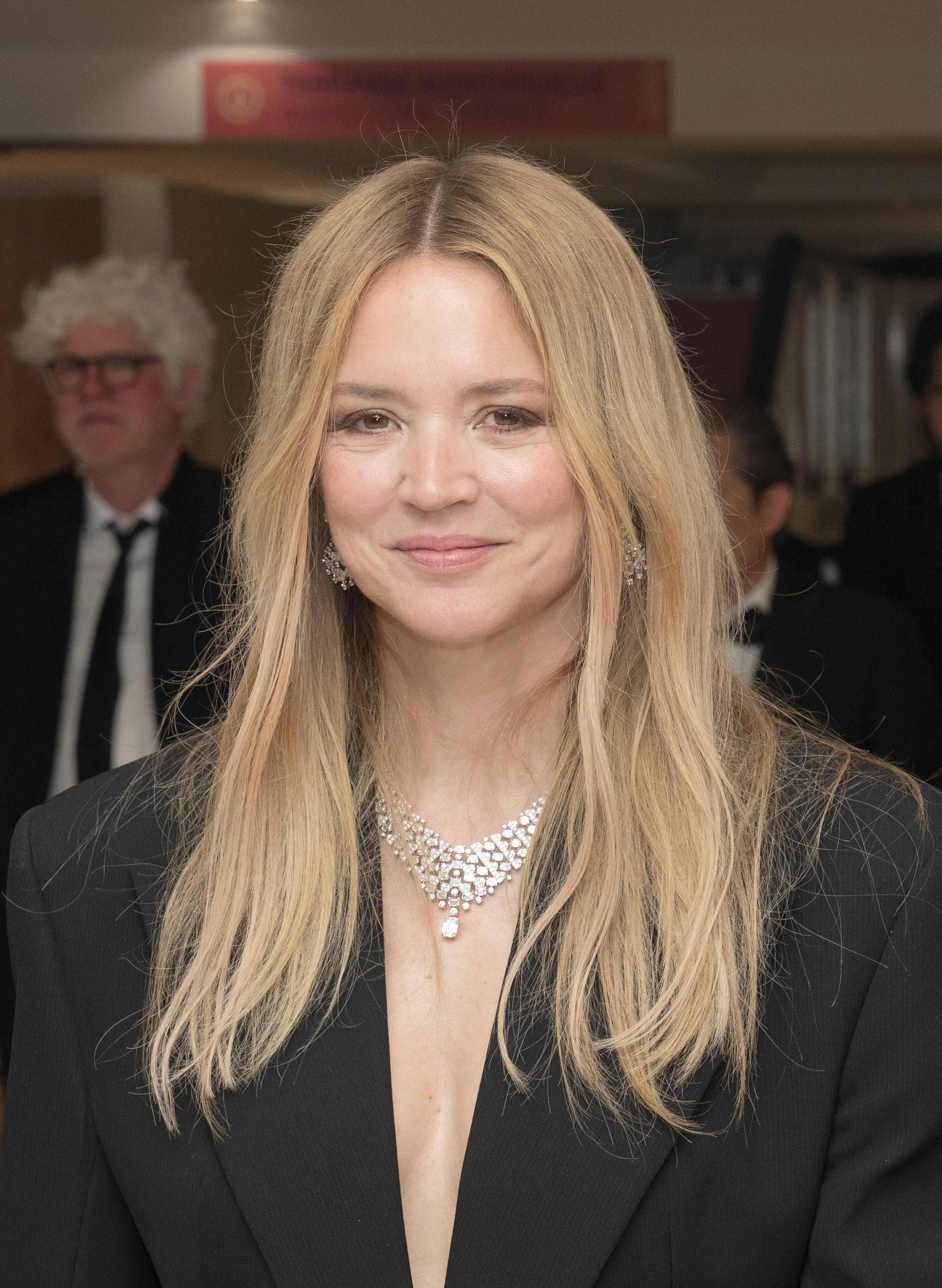
Efira at the 2026 Cannes Film Festival

Efira starred in two films selected to compete for the Palme d'Or at the 2026 Cannes Film Festival: Asghar Farhadi's Parallel Tales and Ryusuke Hamaguchi's All of a Sudden. In the latter, she portrayed the director of a nursing home seeking to implement the Humanitude approach to elderly care, whose convictions are challenged after meeting a terminally ill Japanese playwright. The film received widespread critical acclaim and her performance earned her the Cannes Film Festival Award for Best Actress.

== Personal life ==
Efira married comedian and actor Patrick Ridremont in 2002. They separated in 2005, and filed for divorce in February 2009. From 2012 to 2017, Efira dated director and actor Mabrouk El Mechri, with whom she has a daughter, born in 2013.

In 2016, Efira obtained French citizenship, becoming a dual citizen, for which she later cited her desire to vote in France as the reason. Since 2017, Efira has been in a relationship with actor Niels Schneider, her co-star in the films An Impossible Love (2018) and Sibyl (2019), with whom she has a son, born in 2023. The couple live in the 11th arrondissement of Paris.

== Filmography ==
=== Feature films ===
Year	Title	Role	Director(s)	Notes
2005	Africains poids-moyens	Vickie Marie	Daniel Cattier	Short film
2009	The Barons	The Artist	Nabil Ben Yadir	
2010	Le Siffleur	Candice	Philippe Lefebvre	
2010	L'amour c'est mieux à deux	Angèle	Dominique Farrugia & Arnaud Lemort	
2010	Kill Me Please	Inspector Evrard	Olias Barco	
2011	La Chance de ma vie	Joanna Sorini	Nicolas Cuche	
2011	My Worst Nightmare	Julie	Anne Fontaine	
2012	Hénaut Président	Herself	Michel Muller	
2012	Dead Man Talking	Élisabeth Lacroix	Patrick Ridremont	
2013	Cookie	Delphine	Léa Fazer	
2013	It Boy	Alice Lantins	David Moreau	
2013	Les Invincibles	Caroline	Frédéric Berthe	
2013	Turning Tide	Marie Drevil	Christophe Offenstein	
2015	Caprice	Alicia	Emmanuel Mouret	
2015	Une famille à louer	Violette	Jean-Pierre Améris	
2015	The Sense of Wonder	Louise	Éric Besnard	
2016	Et ta sœur	Marie	Marion Vernoux	
2016	Up for Love	Diane	Laurent Tirard	
2016	Elle	Rebecca	Paul Verhoeven	
2016	In Bed with Victoria	Victoria	Justine Triet	
2017	Pris de court	Nathalie	Emmanuelle Cuau	
2018	Sink or Swim	Delphine	Gilles Lellouche	
2018	An Impossible Love	Rachel	Catherine Corsini	
2018	Keep Going	Sybille	Joachim Lafosse	
2019	Sibyl	Sibyl	Justine Triet	
2020	Night Shift	Virginie	Anne Fontaine	
2020	Bye Bye Morons	Suze Trappet	Albert Dupontel	
2021	Benedetta	Benedetta Carlini	Paul Verhoeven	
2021	Madeleine Collins	Judith Fauvet	Antoine Canet	
2021	Waiting for Bojangles	Camille Fouquet	Régis Roinsar	
2022	Paris Memories	Mia	Alice Winocour	
2022	Don Juan	Julie	Serge Bozon	
2022	Other People's Children	Rachel	Rebecca Zlotowski	
2023	Just the Two of Us	Blanche	Valérie Donzelli	
2023	All to Play For	Sylvie Paugam	Delphine Deloget	
2025	A Private Life	Paula Cohen-Solal	Rebecca Zlotowski	
2025	Les Braises	Karine Bouvier	Thomas Kruithof	
2026	Parallel Tales	Anna / Nita	Asghar Farhadi	
2026	All of a Sudden	Marie-Lou Fontaine	Ryusuke Hamaguchi	

=== Television ===
Year	Title	Role	Director	Notes
2006–2009	Kaamelott	Berlewen, Bohort's wife	Alexandre Astier	Television series, 2 episodes
2007	Un amour de fantôme	Anna	Daniel Cattier	Television film
2007	Off Prime	Herself		Television series
2010	En chantier, monsieur Tanner	The Banker	Stefan Liberski	Television film
2011	À la maison pour Noël	Sarah	Christian Merret-Palmair	Television film
2016	La Folle Soirée du Palmashow 3	Herself		Television series
2017	Call My Agent!	Herself	Laurent Tirard	Television series, 1 episode

=== Dubbing ===
Year	Title	Role	Director(s)	Notes
2004	Garfield: The Movie	Dr. Liz Wilson	Peter Hewitt	French voice
2005	Robots	Piper	Chris Wedge & Carlos Saldanha	French voice
2006	Garfield: A Tail of Two Kitties	Dr. Liz Wilson	Tim Hill	French voice
2008	Max & Co	Cathy	Samuel Guillaume & Frédéric Guillaume	
2011	Puss in Boots	Kitty Softpaws	Chris Miller	French voice
2012	Hotel Transylvania	Mavis	Genndy Tartakovsky	French voice
2015	Hotel Transylvania 2	Mavis	Genndy Tartakovsky	French voice
2017	Tall Tales from the Magical Garden of Antoon Krings	Huguette the wasp	Arnaud Bouron & Antoon Krings	

== Awards and nominations ==
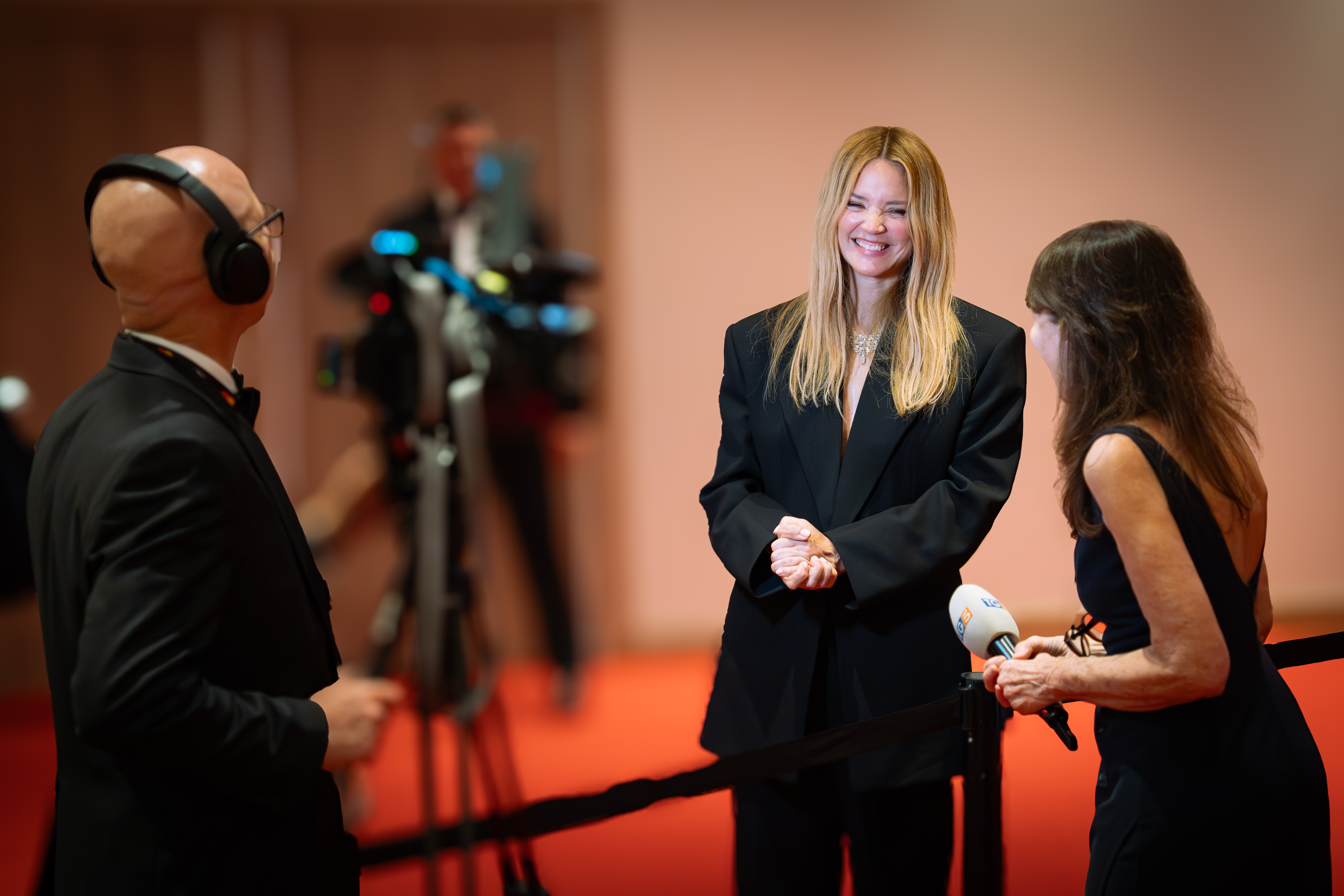
Efira during the 2026 Cannes Film Festival

Year	Award	Category	Work	Result	Ref.
2011	Magritte Awards	Audience Awards	Herself	Won	
2011	Magritte Awards	Best Supporting Actress	Kill Me Please	Nominated	
2016	Magritte Awards	Best Supporting Actress	Elle	Nominated	
2016	Magritte Awards	Best Actress	In Bed with Victoria	Won	
2017	Lumière Awards	Best Actress	In Bed with Victoria	Nominated	
2017	César Awards	Best Actress	In Bed with Victoria	Nominated	
2017	Globes de Cristal Awards	Best Actress	Up for Love	Nominated	
2019	Globes de Cristal Awards	Best Actress	An Impossible Love	Nominated	
2019	Lumière Awards	Best Actress	An Impossible Love	Nominated	
2019	César Awards	Best Actress	An Impossible Love	Nominated	
2019	César Awards	Best Supporting Actress	Sink or Swim	Nominated	
2021	Lumière Awards	Best Actress	Bye Bye Morons	Nominated	
2021	César Awards	Best Actress	Bye Bye Morons	Nominated	
2021	Magritte Awards	Best Actress	Bye Bye Morons	Nominated	
2022	César Awards	Best Actress	Benedetta	Nominated	
2022	Lumière Awards	Best Actress	Benedetta	Nominated	
2023	Lumière Awards	Best Actress	Other People's Children	Won	
2023	César Awards	Best Actress	Paris Memories	Won	
2024	Lumière Awards	Best Actress	All to Play For	Nominated	
2024	César Awards	Best Actress	Just the Two of Us	Nominated	
2026	Locarno Film Festival	Leopard Club Award	Herself	Honored	
2026	Mill Valley Film Festival	Screen Artistry Award	All of a Sudden	Honored	
2026	Cannes Film Festival	Best Actress	All of a Sudden	Won	
2026	Asia Pacific Screen Awards	Best Performance	All of a Sudden	Nominated	
