= The Goldman Case =

2023 film by Cédric Kahn

- Theatrical release poster
- Directed by: Cédric Kahn
- Written by: Cédric Kahn; Nathalie Hertzberg
- Produced by: Benjamin Elalouf
- Starring: Arieh Worthalter; Arthur Harari
- Cinematography: Patrick Ghiringhelli
- Edited by: Yann Dedet
- Production company: Moonshaker
- Distributed by: Ad Vitam
- Release dates: 17 May 2023 (Cannes); 27 September 2023 (France)
- Running time: 107 minutes
- Country: France
- Language: French
- Box office: $2.9 million

The Goldman Case (French: Le Procès Goldman) is 2023 French semi-biographical legal docudrama film starring Arieh Worthalter as Pierre Goldman, a far-left militant who was accused of four murders and his relationship with his lawyer Georges Kiejman.

It had its world premiere in the Directors' Fortnight section at the 76th Cannes Film Festival on 17 May 2023. It was released in France on 27 September 2023. It received eight nominations at the 49th César Awards, and won Best Actor (for Worthalter).

== Cast ==
- Arieh Worthalter as Pierre Goldman
- Arthur Harari as Georges Kiejman
- Stéphan Guérin-Tillié as The President
- Nicolas Briançon as Henri-René Garaud
- Aurélien Chaussade as the Advocate General
- Christian Mazzuchini as Bartoli
- Jeremy Lewin as Chouraqui
- Chloé Lecerf as Christiane Succab-Goldman
- Jerzy Radziwiłowicz as Alter Goldman
- Laetitia Masson as The Psychiatrist
- Didier Borga as Commissaire Jobard
- Arthur Verret as Monsieur Aubert
- Priscilla Lopes as Madame Carrel
- Paul Jeanson as Agent Quinet
- François Favrat as Commissaire Leclerc
- Maxime Tshibangu as Joël Lautric
- Romain Parent as Inspector Goussard
- Lucas Olmedo as Oswaldo Baretto
- Ulysse Dutilloy-Liégeois as Jean-Jacques Goldman

== Release ==
The film was selected to be screened in the Directors' Fortnight section of the 76th Cannes Film Festival, where it had its world premiere on 17 May 2023. The film was theatrically released in France on 27 September 2023 by Ad Vitam.

== Reception ==
=== Critical response ===
On the review aggregator website Rotten Tomatoes, the film holds an approval rating of 97% based on 31 reviews, with an average rating of 7.6/10. Metacritic, which uses a weighted average, assigned the film a score of 82 out of 100, based on 12 critics, indicating "universal acclaim". On AlloCiné, the film received an average rating of 4.4 out of 5 stars, based on 36 reviews from French critics.

=== Accolades ===
Award	Date of ceremony	Category	Recipient(s)	Result	Ref.
César Awards	23 February 2024	Best Film	The Goldman Case	Nominated	
César Awards	23 February 2024	Best Director	Cédric Kahn	Nominated	
César Awards	23 February 2024	Best Actor	Arieh Worthalter	Won	
César Awards	23 February 2024	Best Supporting Actor	Arthur Harari	Nominated	
César Awards	23 February 2024	Best Original Screenplay	Cédric Kahn and Nathalie Hertzberg	Nominated	
César Awards	23 February 2024	Best Cinematography	Patrick Ghiringhelli	Nominated	
César Awards	23 February 2024	Best Editing	Yann Dedet	Nominated	
César Awards	23 February 2024	Best Sound	Erwann Kerzanet, Sylvain Malbrant, and Olivier Guillaume	Nominated	
Lumière Awards	22 January 2024	Best Film	The Goldman Case	Nominated	
Lumière Awards	22 January 2024	Best Director	Cédric Kahn	Nominated	
Lumière Awards	22 January 2024	Best Actor	Arieh Worthalter	Won	
Lumière Awards	22 January 2024	Best Male Revelation	Arthur Harari	Nominated	
Lumière Awards	22 January 2024	Best Screenplay	Cédric Kahn and Nathalie Hertzberg	Nominated	
Magritte Awards	9 March 2024	Best Actor	Arieh Worthalter	Won	
Miskolc International Film Festival	9 September 2023	Emeric Pressburger Prize for Best Feature Film	The Goldman Case	Nominated	
Paris Film Critics Association Awards	4 February 2024	Best Actor	Arieh Worthalter	Won	
Paris Film Critics Association Awards	4 February 2024	Best Male Revelation	Arthur Harari	Nominated	
Paris Film Critics Association Awards	4 February 2024	Best Original Screenplay	Cédric Kahn and Nathalie Herzberg	Nominated	
