= It Boy =

2013 film by David Moreau

- Theatrical release poster
- French: 20 ans d'écart
- Directed by: David Moreau
- Written by: Amro Hamzawi; David Moreau
- Produced by: Abel Nahmias
- Starring: Virginie Efira; Pierre Niney; Charles Berling; Gilles Cohen; Amélie Glenn; Camille Japy; Michaël Abiteboul
- Cinematography: Laurent Tangy
- Edited by: Cyril Besnard
- Music by: Guillaume Roussel
- Production companies: Echo Films; EuropaCorp; TF1 Films Production
- Distributed by: EuropaCorp Distribution
- Release date: 6 March 2013
- Running time: 92 minutes
- Country: France
- Language: French
- Budget: €7.3 million
- Box office: $12.6 million

It Boy (French: 20 ans d'écart, lit. '20 Years Apart') is a 2013 French romantic comedy film co-written and directed by David Moreau. It stars Virginie Efira and Pierre Niney, and follows the story of a 38-year-old woman and her relationship with a young man.

== Cast ==
- Virginie Efira as Alice Lantins
- Pierre Niney as Balthazar
- Charles Berling as Luc Apfel
- Gilles Cohen as Vincent Khan
- Amélie Glenn as Lise Duchêne
- Camille Japy as Elisabeth Lantins
- Michaël Abiteboul as Simon
- Louis-Do de Lencquesaing as Julien
- François Civil as a student
- Blanche Gardin as the photographer

== Reception ==
In France, the film averages 3.6/5 on the AlloCiné from 14 press reviews.

== Accolades ==
- Cabourg Film Festival: Swann d'Or for Best Actor (Pierre Niney)
