= Arieh Worthalter =

French-Belgian actor

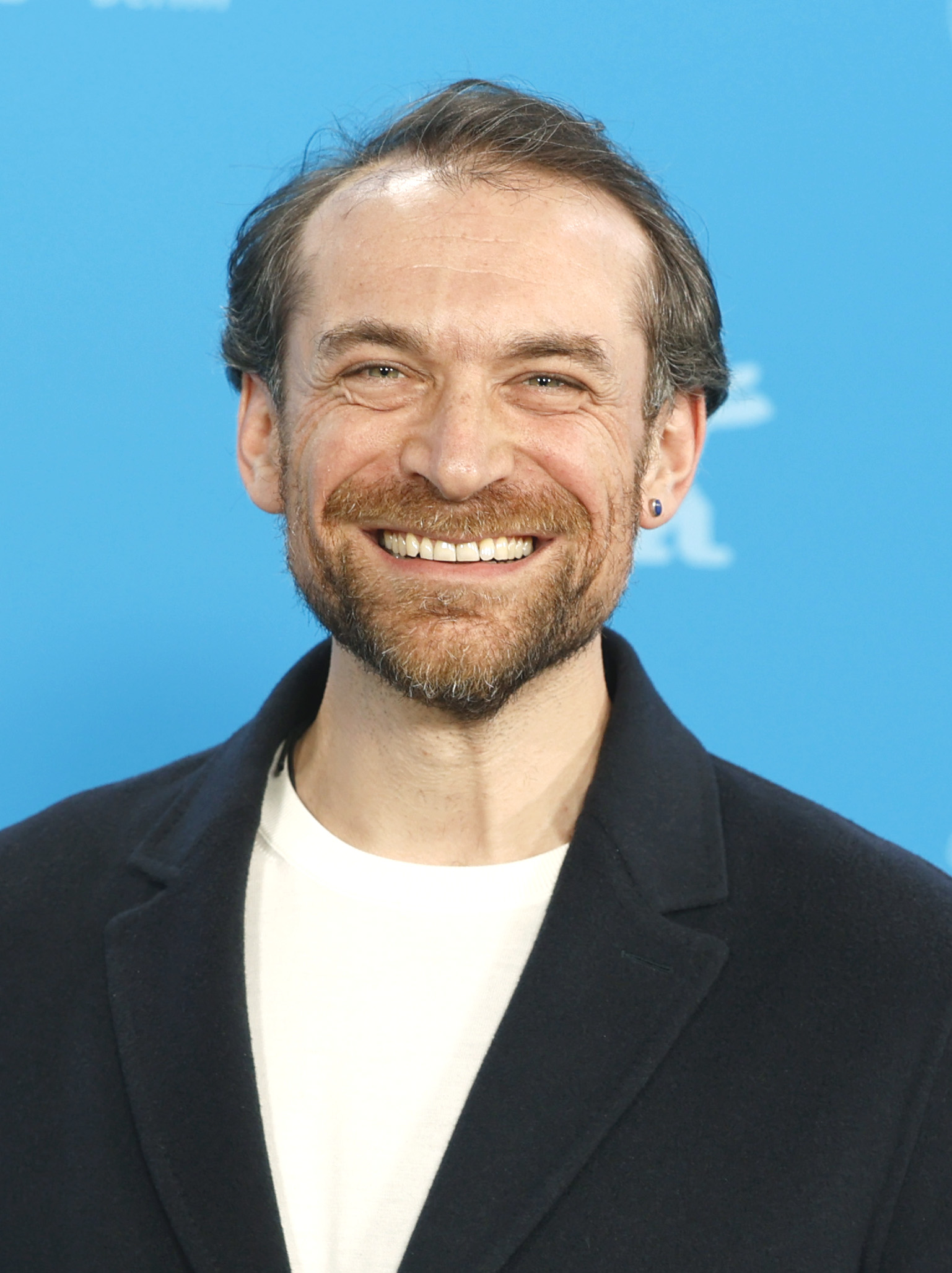
- Worthalter in 2026
- Born: 25 March 1985 (age 41); Paris, France
- Education: Institut Supérieur des Arts
- Years active: 2007–present

Arieh Worthalter (born 25 March 1985) is a French-Belgian stage and film actor.

== Early life ==
Arieh Worthalter was born in Paris on 25 March 1985 to a Belgian mother and French father. He studied at the Institut Supérieur des Arts (INSAS) in Brussels and began working in theatre.

== Career ==
His film credits include Les Anarchistes (2015), Marie Curie: The Courage of Knowledge (2016), Eternity (2016), Bastille Day (2016), and Razzia (2017).

He received three Magritte Awards for Best Supporting Actor for his performances in Girl (2018), Mothers' Instinct (2018) and All to Play For (2023). For his portrayal of Pierre Goldman in The Goldman Case (2023), he received the Lumière Award for Best Actor, César Award for Best Actor and Magritte Award for Best Actor.

== Personal life ==
In his acceptance speech at the 49th César Awards, Worthalter called for a ceasefire in the Gaza war and the release of hostages.

== Selected filmography ==
Year	Title	Role	Notes
2012	The Attack	Man	
2015	Les Anarchistes	Adrian	
2016	Marie Curie: The Courage of Knowledge	Paul Langevin	
2016	Eternity	Jules	
2016	Bastille Day	Jean	
2016	Past Imperfect	Olivier	Nominated—Magritte Award for Most Promising Actor
2017	Razzia	Joe	
2018	Girl	Mathias Verhaeghen	Magritte Award for Best Supporting Actor; Nominated—Ensor Award for Best Actor; Nominated—CinEuphoria Award for Best Supporting Actor - International Competition
2018	Mothers' Instinct	Damien Geniot	Magritte Award for Best Supporting Actor
2020	Hunted	The Handsome	
2020	The Whaler Boy	The Border Guard	
2021	Hold Me Tight	Marc	Nominated—Magritte Award for Best Actor
2022	The Green Perfume	Aimé	
2022	Saturn Bowling	Guillaume	
2023	The Goldman Case	Pierre Goldman	César Award for Best Actor; Lumière Award for Best Actor; Magritte Award for Best Actor
2023	All to Play For	Hervé Paugam	Magritte Award for Best Supporting Actor
2024	Life's a Bitch	Franck	Magritte Award for Best Actor
2024	Who by Fire	Blake Cadieux	
2026	Dust	Geert	
2026	Le Faux Soir	Marc “Yvon” Aubrion	
TBA	Pumping Black		Filming
