= Niels Schneider =

Franco-Canadian actor (born 1987)

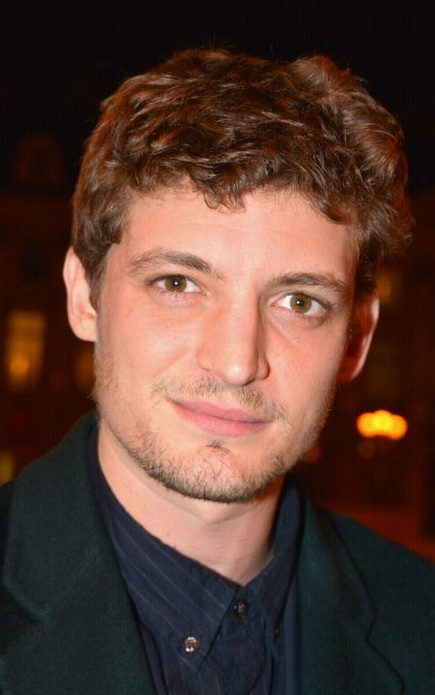
- Schneider in 2017
- Born: 18 June 1987 (age 39); Paris, France
- Citizenship: French; Canadian
- Occupation: Actor
- Years active: 2007–present
- Partner: Virginie Efira (2017–present)
- Children: 1
- Relatives: Aliocha Schneider (brother); Vassili Schneider (brother)
- Website: http://www.niels-schneider.net/

Niels Schneider (French: [nils ʃnɛdɛʁ]; born 18 June 1987) is a French-Canadian actor. He had his breakthrough role in Xavier Dolan's film I Killed My Mother (2009), and gained international recognition in Dolan's Heartbeats (2010). In 2011, he won the Trophée Chopard Award for Male Revelation of the Year at the Cannes Film Festival. In 2017, he won the César Award for Most Promising Actor for his performance in Dark Inclusion (2016). In 2019, he was named a Knight of the Order of Arts and Letters in France. He has been living and working based in Paris for most of his career.

== Early life ==
Born in Paris, the second of five boys, he had an older brother and has three younger brothers. Schneider was 9 years old when his family moved to Montreal. He later became a naturalized citizen. He started his acting career doing voice-over jobs. His father, Jean-Paul Schneider, was an actor, and his mother, Isabelle Schneider, was a model. His paternal grandmother was a Russian Jewish immigrant to France, who came with her family as a child when they fled the Russian Revolution in 1920.

He has four brothers, including actors Aliocha, Volodiya, and Vassili Schneider. On 8 September 2003, their eldest brother, actor Vadim Schneider, and co-star Jaclyn Linetsky, both 17 years old, died as a result of a road accident while they were driving to the filming of an episode of 15/Love. Their minivan lost control and collided with oncoming traffic.

== Career ==
Schneider had his breakthrough role in Xavier Dolan's directorial debut film, I Killed My Mother (2009), and gained international recognition in Dolan's second feature film, Heartbeats (2010). In 2011, he won the Trophée Chopard Award for Male Revelation of the Year at the Cannes Film Festival.

In 2017, he won the César Award for Most Promising Actor for his performance in Dark Inclusion (2016).

In 2023, he starred in the television series Of Money and Blood, directed by Xavier Giannoli.

He played General Leclerc in a two-part biopic of Charles de Gaulle, filmed in 2023 and 2024.

== Personal life ==
Schneider is an atheist.

Since 2017, Schneider has been in a relationship with actress Virginie Efira, with whom he co-starred in the films An Impossible Love (2018) and Sibyl (2019). Their son, Hiro, was born on 28 August 2023. They live in the 11th arrondissement of Paris.

In 2019, Schneider was named a Knight of the Order of Arts and Letters in France.

In June 2024, Schneider signed a petition addressed to French President Emmanuel Macron demanding France to officially recognize the State of Palestine.

== Filmography ==
Year	Title	Role	Notes
2007	The Taste of Nothingness	Ami de Julien	
2008	Everything Is Fine	Sasha	
2009	I Killed My Mother	Éric	
2009	Taking the Plunge 2	Frère d'Anna	
2009	Les chroniques de l'autre	Louis	Short film
2010	Snow Hides the Shade of Fig Trees (La neige cache l'ombre des figuiers)	Sacha adulte	
2010	Heartbeats	Nicolas	
2010	Fatal	Le baveux en voiture	
2010	2 Frogs in the West (2 Frogs dans l'Ouest)	Max	
2011	Bonne journée	Nick	Short film
2011	The Howling: Reborn	Roland	
2011	Un autre monde	Louis	TV film
2011	Val d'or	Théo	TV film
2011	Toy Soldier	Aubrey	Short film
2012	L'âge atomique	Theo	
2012	Clash	Raphaël	TV series
2012	Les ravissements	Etienne	
2012	Chaos	Thibaut	Nominated—Lumière Award for Best Male Revelation
2013	Nous irons ensemble	Lo	Short film
2013	You and the Night	Matthias	
2013	Opium	Maurice Sachs	
2013	Odysseus	Télémaque	TV series
2013	Libre et assoupi		
2014	Quantum Love	Hugo	
2014	Métamorphose	Le Désenchanté / Le Monstre	
2014	Collisions	Henri	Short film
2014	Voice Over (La voz en off)	Antoine	
2014	Gemma Bovery	Hervé de Bressigny	
2015	The Art Dealer	Klaus	
2016	Dark Inclusion	Pier Ulmann	César Award for Most Promising Actor; Nominated—Lumière Award for Best Male Revelation
2016	Polina	Adrien	
2017	Dalida	Jean Sobieski	
2018	The Black Book	Marquis Lusault	
2018	An Impossible Love	Philippe Arnold	
2018	The Most Assassinated Woman in the World	Jean	
2019	Curiosa	Pierre Louÿs	
2019	A Brother's Love	Alex	
2019	Sibyl	Gabriel	
2019	Back Home	Thomas Moreno	
2019	Sympathy for the Devil	Paul Marchand	
2020	Love Affair(s)	Maxime	
2021	Totems	Francis Mareuil	TV series
2023	Of Money and Blood	Jérôme Attias	TV series
2023	Coup de chance	Alain	
2023	Spirit of Ecstasy	Augustin	Original title: La Vénus d'argent
2026	De Gaulle	Philippe Leclerc	Two-part epic biographical drama film
2026	The Unknown	David Zimmerman / Malia	

== Decorations ==
- Knight of the Order of Arts and Letters (2019)
