= All to Play For =

2023 film by Delphine Deloget

- Theatrical release poster
- French: Rien à perdre
- Literally: Nothing to lose
- Directed by: Delphine Deloget
- Written by: Delphine Deloget; Camille Fontaine (collaboration); Olivier Demangel (collaboration)
- Produced by: Olivier Delbosc
- Starring: Virginie Efira; Félix Lefebvre; Arieh Worthalter; Mathieu Demy; India Hair
- Cinematography: Guillaume Schiffman
- Edited by: Béatrice Herminie
- Music by: Nicolas Giraud
- Production companies: Curiosa Films; Unité; France 3 Cinéma; Umedia
- Distributed by: Ad Vitam
- Release dates: 25 May 2023 (Cannes); 22 November 2023 (France)
- Running time: 112 minutes
- Countries: France; Belgium
- Language: French

All to Play For (French: Rien à perdre, lit. 'Nothing to lose') is a 2023 drama film written and directed by Delphine Deloget. It stars Virginie Efira as a mother fighting for custody of her son after he is injured when she is at work.

It had its world premiere in the Un Certain Regard section at the 76th Cannes Film Festival on 25 May 2023. It was distributed in France on 22 November 2023 by Ad Vitam.

== Plot ==
Single mother Sylvie lives in Brest with her two children Jean-Jacques and Sofiane. One night while she is away at work, Sofiane is injured in their apartment. The accident is reported and Sofiane is placed in a care home. Accused of negligence, Sylvie must fight against the judicial and administrative system for custody of her son.

== Cast ==
- Virginie Efira as Sylvie Paugam
- Félix Lefebvre as Jean-Jacques Paugam
- Arieh Worthalter as Hervé Paugam
- Mathieu Demy as Alain Paugam
- India Hair as Louise Henry
- Alexis Tonetti as Sofiane Paugam
- Andréa Brusque as Nathalie
- Oussama Kheddam as Farid
- Audrey Mikondo as Asma
- Caroline Gay as Maria
- Nadir Legrand as ASE director
- Jean-Luc Vincent as music teacher
- Leo Poulet as Sam

== Production ==
Delphine Deloget wrote the film's screenplay, in collaboration with Camille Fontaine and Olivier Demangel. All to Play For was produced by Curiosa Films in co-production with Unité, France 3 Cinéma and Umedia.

Principal photography began on 17 January 2022. Filming took place in Brest and its surrounding area, wrapping on 4 March 2022. Guillaume Schiffman served as the director of photography.

== Release ==
The film was selected to be screened in the Un Certain Regard section of the 76th Cannes Film Festival, where it had its world premiere on 25 May 2023.

The film was theatrically released in France on 22 November 2023, distributed by Ad Vitam.

Hope Runs High gave the film a limited theatrical release in the United States beginning on 14 May 2025 at Laemmle Theatres in Los Angeles.

== Reception ==
=== Critical response ===
All to Play For received an average rating of 3.5 out of 5 stars on the French website AlloCiné, based on 27 reviews. On Rotten Tomatoes, the film holds an approval rating of 82% based on 17 reviews, with an average rating of 5.5/10.

=== Accolades ===
Award	Date of ceremony	Category	Recipient(s)	Result	Ref.
Angoulême Francophone Film Festival	27 August 2023	Valois des étudiants	Delphine Deloget	Won	
Cannes Film Festival	26 May 2023	Prix Un Certain Regard	Delphine Deloget	Nominated	
Cannes Film Festival	27 May 2023	Caméra d'Or	Delphine Deloget	Nominated	
Deauville American Film Festival	10 September 2023	Prix Ornano-Valenti	Delphine Deloget	Won	
Lumière Awards	22 January 2024	Best Actress	Virginie Efira	Nominated	
Magritte Awards	9 March 2024	Best Supporting Actor	Arieh Worthalter	Won	
