= Victoire Du Bois =

French actress

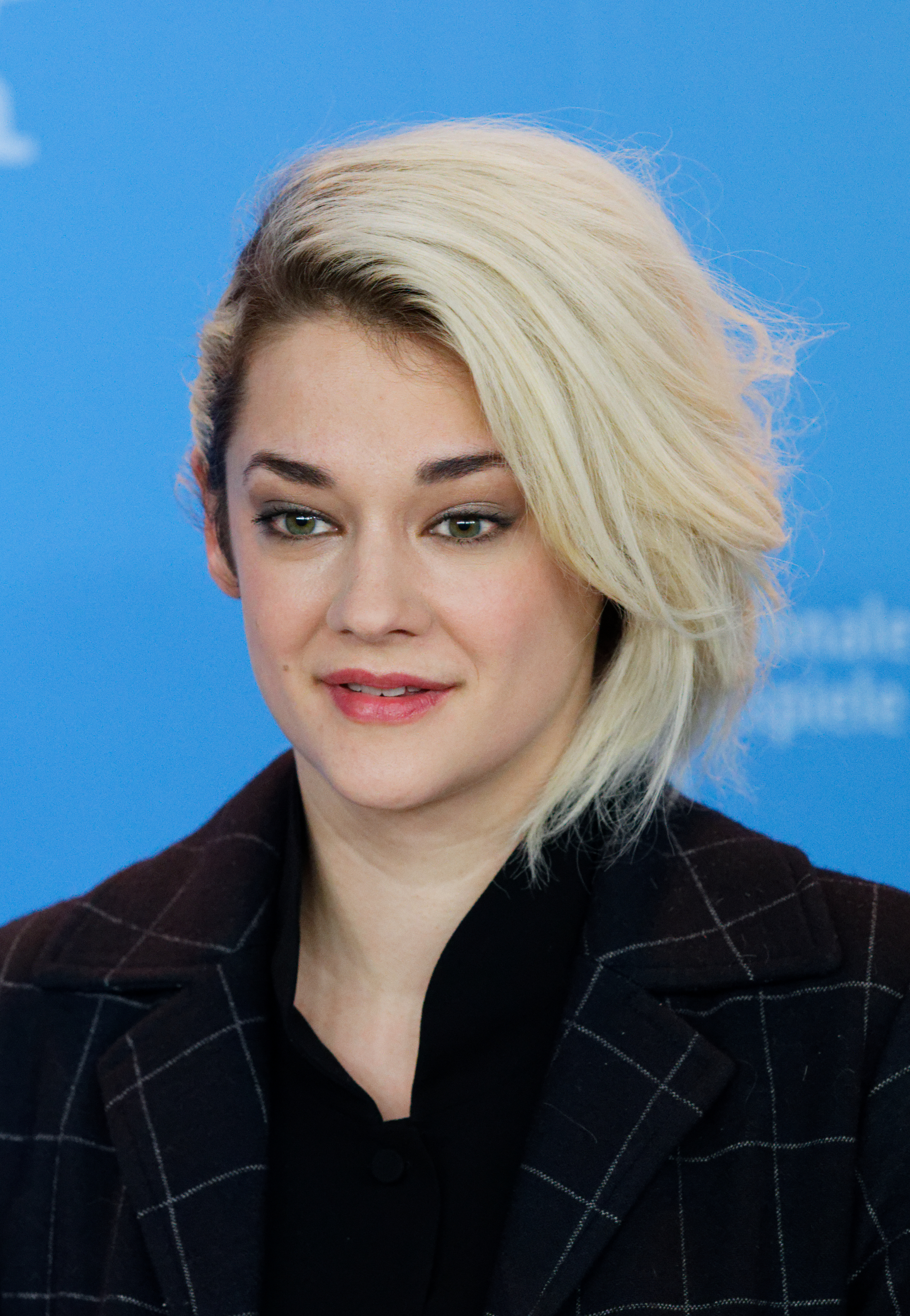
- Victoire Du Bois at the 2017 Berlinale
- Born: 1988 or 1989 (age 37–38); Nantes, France
- Education: Conservatoire National Supérieur d'Art Dramatique
- Occupation: Actress
- Years active: 2011–present

Victoire Du Bois (French pronunciation: [viktwaʁ dy bwa]; born 14 June 1988/89) is a French actress who made her film debut in Volker Schlöndorff's Calm at Sea (2011). She is best known for playing Jeannie in From the Land of the Moon (2016), Chiara in Call Me by Your Name (2017), and for her leading role as Emma Larsimon on the Netflix show Marianne (2019). She was educated at a lycée in Nantes. Du Bois studied acting at L'Ecole du Jeu and at the Conservatoire National Supérieur d'Art Dramatique (French National Academy of Dramatic Arts).

== Filmography ==
=== Film ===
Year	Title	Role	Notes
2011	Calm at Sea	Odette de Niles	
2013	The Family	Pink Ribbon Girl	
2014	Ada et ses amis	Rosalie	Short film
2015	We Need To Talk About Amalia Now	Cécile	Short film
2015	The Forbidden Room	Lotte	
2016	Seances		
2016	From the Land of the Moon	Jeannie	
2017	Call Me by Your Name	Chiara	
2017	Something Is Burning		Short film
2017	Nous sommes jeunes et nos jours sont longs	Annie	
2017	Gros chagrin	Mathilde	Short film
2017	Hédi & Sarah	Victoire	Short film
2018	Que la nuit s'achève	Gaëlle	
2019	I Lost My Body	Gabrielle	
2019	Matriochkas	Rebecca	Short film
2020	Les Contes du Cockatoo	Sorcière	Short film
2021	L'homme silencieux	La collègue (voice)	Short film
2022	Ce n'est rien		Short film
2022	Novembre	Julia	
2022	Petites	Clo	
2022	White Paradise	Justine	
2025	Nino	Oncologist	
2026	A Girl's Story	Professor	
2026	The Unknown	Sophie Caro	
2026	Orange-Flavoured Wedding	Odette	

=== Television ===
Year	Title	Role	Notes
2012	Main courante	Chany	Episode: "Dérapages"
2019	Marianne	Emma Larsimon	Netflix; Main role
2022	Reign Supreme	Nina Hagen	Episode: "Nova"
2023	Of Money and Blood	Émilie Weynachter	TV miniseries
2024	Becoming Karl Lagerfeld	Anne de Bascher	Disney+; TV series

== Theatre ==
Year	Production	Role	Director
2013	L'odeur du sang humain ne me quitte pas des yeux	Lady Macbeth	Philippe Ulysse
2017–2018	La Princesse Maleine	Princesse Maleine	Pascal Kirsch
2018	Le Traitement	Anne	Rémy Barché
