= Age of Panic =

- Film poster
- La Bataille de Solférino
- Directed by: Justine Triet
- Written by: Justine Triet
- Produced by: Emmanuel Chaumet
- Starring: Laetitia Dosch; Vincent Macaigne; Arthur Harari
- Cinematography: Tom Harari
- Edited by: Damien Maestraggi
- Production companies: Ecce Films; Ciné+ Centre National de la Cinématographie (CNC)
- Distributed by: Shellac Distribution (France)
- Release dates: 20 May 2013 (Cannes Film Festival); 4 July 2013 (France)
- Running time: 94 minutes
- Country: France
- Language: French
- Box office: $235,000

Age of Panic (French: La Bataille de Solférino, "The Battle of Solferino") is a 2013 French comedy drama film written and directed by Justine Triet. It was nominated for Best First Feature Film at the 2014 César Awards.

Much of the film was shot on the streets of Paris during the 6 May 2012 national elections.

== Plot ==
On 6 May 2012, the day of the second round of the French presidential election, TV journalist Laetitia (Dosch) is late leaving home for her assignment covering the events on Rue de Solférino (at the headquarters of the Socialist Party) when her ex, Vincent (Macaigne), shows up a day late to his court-appointed time to visit their two daughters.

== Cast ==
- Laetitia Dosch as Laetitia
- Vincent Macaigne as Vincent
- Arthur Harari as Arthur
- Virgil Vernier as Virgil
- Marc-Antoine Vaugeois as Marc
- Jeane Ara-Bellanger as Jeane
- Liv Harari as Liv
- Emilie Brisavoine as Emilie
- Vatsana Sedone as Vatsana, the neighbor
- Colin Ledoux as man of the couple on the bridge
- Chloé Lagrenade as woman of the couple on the bridge
- Maxime Schneider as the driver
- Guilhem Amesland as the militant fighter
- Aurélien Bellanger as the militant UMP
- Zine-Zine Sidi Omar as the investigator (as Sidi Omar Zine Zine)

== Title ==
The original title is La Bataille de Solférino, referring to the Battle of Solferino (an 1859 battle during the Second Italian War of Independence) and the Rue de Solférino, a street in the Left Bank area of Paris, where the headquarters of the French Socialist Party (PS) are located.

== Soundtrack ==
The closing credits features the song "Lose Your Soul" by Dead Man's Bones.

== Release ==
Age of Panic had its premiere in Cannes' ACID program.

Age of Panic had theatrical showings in North America as part of the Rendez-vous with French Cinema series 2014 program (first screening on 7 March).

== Reception ==
Review aggregation website Rotten Tomatoes reported an approval rating of 100%, based on 8 reviews, with an average score of 7.1/10.

Jordan Mintzer of The Hollywood Reporter said of it: "With several scenes filmed on location during the actual Election Day events, Age of Panic mixes documentary-style drama with scenes of Mumblecore-esque comedy in ways that are often compelling and occasionally quite funny. Triet definitely has a knack for creating uncomfortable situations that go from bad to awful, only to suddenly lighten up in the interim, and although she can't quite sustain things for feature length, the film's smart setup and ambitious shooting tactics make for a highly watchable affair."

Ronnie Scheib of Variety commented that "Triet brilliantly orchestrates the intersection of documentary and fiction. [...] [T]he spontaneous ebb and flow of the enormous French crowds seen here synchs visually and rhythmically with the film's domestic Sturm und Drang, acted throughout with improvisatory immediacy. Although Drosch's [sic] Laetitia acts out the precarious pressures of the harassed career mom with considerable brio, it is Macaigne's Vincent, almost psychotically internalizing the panic of his thirtysomething generation, that lingers in the mind; indeed, the downbeat, dirty-haired Macaigne seems to be emerging as French indie cinema's newest neurotic loser par excellence."

Kent Turner of Film-Forward said that "[n]o caffeine is necessary before watching Justine Triet's The Age of Panic, with its anxiety-producing first hour [...] There's not a chance that anyone will nod off. The film singly breaks the festival out of any art-house stupor.

The IFC Center called it an "enormously promising first feature, a very funny comedy of discomfort infused with documentary-style energy [...] all within the frame of one manic day in Paris."

In Cahiers du Cinéma's top ten of 2013, it occupies the tenth place.

== Accolades ==
Year	Award / Festival	Category	Recipient(s)	Result	Ref.
2013	Paris Cinema International Film Festival	Audience Award	Justine Triet	Won	
2013	Mar del Plata International Film Festival	Best Film - International Competition	Justine Triet	Nominated	
2014	César Awards	Best First Feature Film	Justine Triet	Nominated	
