= Justine Triet =

French filmmaker (born 1978)

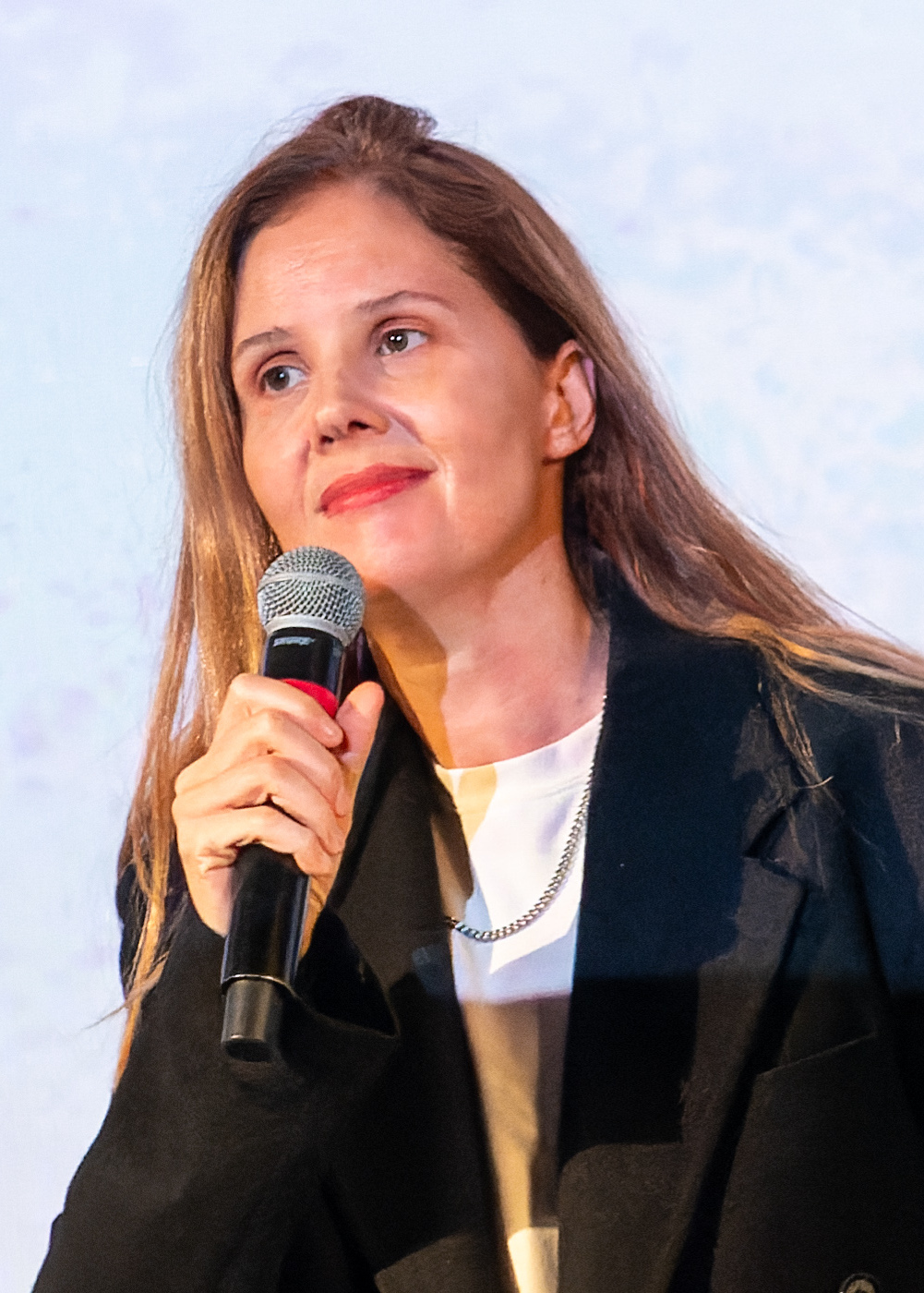
- Triet in 2023
- Born: 17 July 1978 (age 48); Fécamp, Seine-Maritime department, France
- Education: Beaux-Arts de Paris
- Occupations: Film director; screenwriter; editor
- Years active: 2007–present
- Partner: Arthur Harari
- Children: 2
- Awards: Full list

Justine Triet (French: [ʒystin tʁije]; born 17 July 1978) is a French film director, screenwriter, and editor. She has received several awards including an Academy Award, BAFTA Award, a Palme d'Or, three César Awards, and two Golden Globe Awards.

Triet started her career making documentary short films surrounding social justice issues and commentary starting with Sur Place (2007) which explored the 2006 youth protests in France. She made her narrative directorial feature film debut with the comedy drama Age of Panic (2013) followed by the romantic comedy In Bed with Victoria (2016) and the drama Sibyl (2019).

She gained widespread acclaim for directing Anatomy of a Fall, which debuted at the 76th Cannes Film Festival and won the Palme d'Or, making Triet the third female director to win the award. In 2024, she became the first female French filmmaker to be nominated for the Academy Award for Best Director and to win the Academy Award for Best Original Screenplay.

== Early life and education ==
Triet is a graduate of the Beaux-Arts de Paris. She grew up in Paris, France with her two siblings and spent much of her childhood in a Buddhist community.

== Career ==
=== 2007–2009: Documentary short films ===
The majority of her early work consisted of short documentary filmmaking focused on social justice issues and commentary, beginning with Sur Place (2007), L’Orde des mots (2007), Solférino (2009), and Des ombres dans la maison (2010). On the Spot or Sur Place (2007), shot, edited, and directed by Triet, is a documentary film depicting the 2006 youth protests in France with a more nuanced coverage than what was televised. Binding Words or L’Orde des mots (2007), co-directed and edited by Triet, tackles questions of sexual identity head on. Solférino (2009), shot, edited, and directed by Triet, covered the 2007 French presidential election. Shadows in the House or Des ombres dans la maison (2010), shot, edited, and directed by Triet, focuses on Paulo Gustavo's life with his mother who struggles with alcoholism.

=== 2012–2022: Narrative films ===
In 2012, Triet began to shift away from documentary films, writing and directing her first short film, Two Ships, which garnered a total of 9 total awards and 6 additional nominations in the film festival circuit that year, including Best European Short Film at the Berlin International Film Festival and Grand Prize for the Best International Short-film at the Angers European First Film Festival. Her directorial debut feature film, Age of Panic, was presented as part of the ACID programme at the 2013 Cannes Film Festival and was ranked number 10 on Cahiers du Cinéma's Top 10 List in 2013, after being highlighted by critic Stéphane Delorme in the April 2013 editorial among a generation of young, emerging French filmmakers. The film also won the Audience Award for Best Short Film at the Paris International Film Festival.

In 2016, she wrote and directed the romantic comedy-drama In Bed with Victoria, which was nominated for the César Awards for Best Film and Best Original Screenplay. In 2019, her comedy-drama film Sibyl premiered at the 2019 Cannes Film Festival, where it competed for the Palme d'Or.

=== 2023–present: Anatomy of a Fall and acclaim ===
In 2023, her courtroom thriller Anatomy of a Fall was presented at the 2023 Cannes Film Festival, where it won the Palme d'Or, making Triet the third female director to win the award. She also won two Golden Globe Awards for Best Screenplay and Best Foreign Language Film. In 2024, Triet became the first female French filmmaker and the eighth female director to be nominated for the Academy Award for Best Director for Anatomy of a Fall, also winning the Academy Award for Best Original Screenplay (making her the first French woman to win it), with the film receiving a total of 5 nominations, including Best Picture. Triet also won a BAFTA Award for Best Original Screenplay and was nominated for Best Director and Best Film Not in the English Language for Anatomy of a Fall, which received 7 nominations in total, including Best Film. Triet also won three César Awards for Best Film, Best Director and Best Original Screenplay for Anatomy of a Fall, which won a total of 6 awards at the 2024 César Awards.

== Influences and recognition ==
In February 2020, her 50 inspirational films were published on LaCinetek. Triet listed two works each by Gus Van Sant (Gerry and Psycho), Robert Zemeckis (What Lies Beneath and Contact), and Frederick Wiseman (Juvenile Court and Welfare), as well as three by Richard Fleischer (Mandingo, The Boston Strangler, See No Evil).

In June 2024, Triet was invited to become a member of the Academy of Motion Picture Arts and Sciences.

== Personal life ==
=== Relationships ===
Triet is in a relationship with French filmmaker Arthur Harari, with whom she has two daughters. The couple first worked together on Triet's Age of Panic (2013), with Arthur starring as the friend and the lawyer of Laetitia's boyfriend. Since then, the couple had occasionally helped with each other's projects, the most recent one being the screenplay for Anatomy of a Fall (2023); however, they do not plan to collaborate on any future projects.

=== Politics and beliefs ===
Triet is a member of the French gender equality group Collectif 50/50.

While receiving her Palme d'Or at the 2023 Cannes Film Festival, Triet declared her support for the pension reform protest movement and opposed to President Emmanuel Macron's repression of it. She accused the "neo-liberal government" of fostering cultural commercialization and weakening France's cultural exceptionalism.

Triet dedicated her prize to new directors and those facing challenges in the film industry, urging greater chances and support for rising talent. Her remarks linked to debates that took place in France in October 2022 at the Appel aux Etats Generaux (Call for General Assemblies), an exhibition conference. Some industry insiders blamed French "auteur" filmmaking for dwindling box office revenue, and urged a reduction in French film output. Triet's speech was criticized by Macron's party, right-wing activists and politicians, and by French culture minister Rima Abdul Malak, who said she was "flabbergasted by such unfair comments." Triet's speech received support from left-wing politicians and the SRF, the French directors's guild. According to Variety, several French insiders claimed that Triet was "punished" for criticizing Macron when France's Oscar committee chose to submit The Taste of Things over Anatomy of a Fall to represent the country in the Best International Feature Film category at the 96th Academy Awards.

In January 2024, she signed a petition against Javier Milei's reforms on Argentine film schools.

== Filmography ==
=== Feature films ===
Year	English Title	Original Title	Notes
2013	Age of Panic	La Bataille de Solférino	
2016	In Bed with Victoria	Victoria	
2019	Sibyl		
2023	Anatomy of a Fall	Anatomie d'une chute	
TBA	Fonda		Post-production

=== Documentaries ===
Year	Title	Credited as			
Year	Title	Director	Producer	Editor	Cinematographer
2007	Sur place (Note: Documentary short film)	Yes	Yes	Yes	Yes
2007	L'Ordre des mots	No	No	Yes	No
2009	Solférino	Yes	Yes	Yes	Yes
2010	Des ombres dans la maison	Yes	No	Yes	Yes

=== Short films ===
Year	Title
2007	Sur place (Note: Documentary short film)
2012	Two Ships (Note: Short film)

== See also ==
- List of French Academy Award winners and nominees
