= Dark Inclusion =

- Film poster
- Diamant noir
- Directed by: Arthur Harari
- Written by: Arthur Harari; Vincent Poymiro; Olivier Seror; Agnès Feuvre
- Produced by: David Thion; Philippe Martin
- Starring: Niels Schneider; August Diehl
- Cinematography: Tom Harari
- Edited by: Laurent Sénéchal
- Music by: Olivier Marguerit
- Production companies: Les Films Pelléas; Savage Film; Frakas Productions; France 2 Cinéma; Jouror Productions
- Distributed by: Ad Vitam (France)
- Release dates: 28 January 2016 (Angers); 8 June 2016 (France)
- Running time: 115 minutes
- Countries: France; Belgium; Canada
- Language: French
- Budget: $3.8 million
- Box office: $355.000

Dark Inclusion (French: Diamant noir; also known as Dark Diamond) is a 2016 French drama film directed and co-written by Arthur Harari, and starring Niels Schneider and August Diehl. It tells the story of an aimless young man who decides he must avenge the wrong done to his father by his wealthy uncle, a diamond dealer in Antwerp. His plan is not as clever as he thinks and, after three of his helpers are killed, he ends up even more alienated.

== Plot ==
Pier Ullman works at odd jobs and also does some break-ins with his friend Kevin for Rachid. One day he is informed of the death of his father, about whom he had no news for several years. He decides to avenge his father, who had been mistreated by Pier's grandfather and uncle. He makes contact with his father's family and works his way into their diamond business in Antwerp.

== Cast ==
- Niels Schneider as Pier Ulmann
- August Diehl as Gabi Ulmann
- Hans-Peter Cloos as Joseph Ulmann
- Abdel Hafed Benotman as Rachid
- Raphaële Godin as Luisa
- Raghunath Manet as Vijay Sha Gopal
- Jos Verbist as Rick De Vries
- Guillaume Verdier as Kevin
- Hilde Van Mieghem as Olga

== Accolades ==
Award / Film Festival	Category	Recipients and nominees	Result
César Awards	Most Promising Actor	Niels Schneider	Won
César Awards	Best First Feature Film		Nominated
Jacques Deray Prize			Won
Louis Delluc Prize	Best First Film		Nominated
Lumière Awards	Best Male Revelation	Niels Schneider	Nominated
Lumière Awards	Best First Film		Nominated
