= Arthur Harari =

French actor and filmmaker (born 1981)

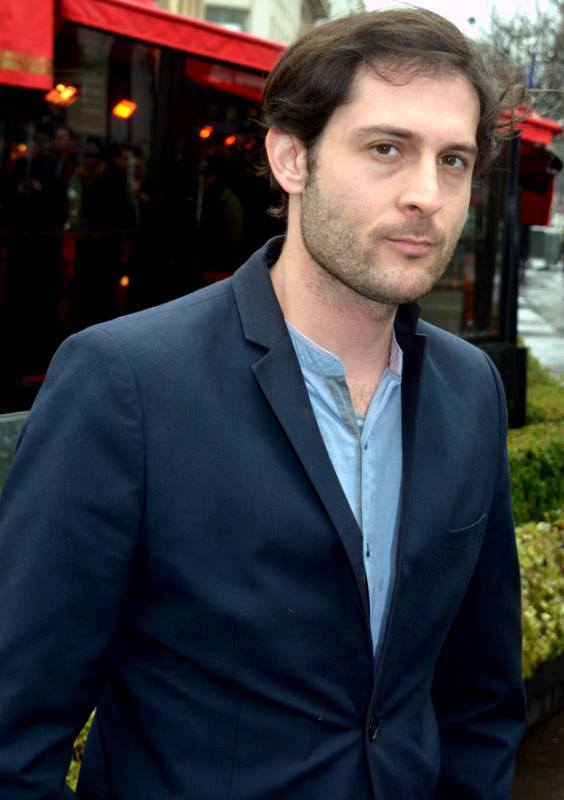
- Harari in 2017
- Born: 1981 (age 44–45); Paris, France
- Occupations: Filmmaker; screenwriter; actor
- Years active: 2005–present
- Partner: Justine Triet
- Children: 2
- Relatives: Clément Harari (grandfather)

Arthur Harari (born 1981 in Paris) is a French filmmaker, screenwriter and actor. He is most known for co-writing Anatomy of a Fall (2023) with Justine Triet, for which he won the Golden Globe Award for Best Screenplay, BAFTA Award for Best Original Screenplay, César Award for Best Original Screenplay and Academy Award for Best Original Screenplay.

He made his directorial debut with the crime drama Dark Inclusion (2016). For the war-drama Onoda: 10,000 Nights in the Jungle (2021), he won the César Award for Best Original Screenplay.

== Career ==
After three shorts and a medium-length film, Harari directed his debut feature Dark Inclusion (2016), a heist film and family revenge drama about diamond dealers in Antwerp.

His second feature film, Onoda: 10,000 Nights in the Jungle, was selected to be screened as the opening film in the Un Certain Regard section at the 2021 Cannes Film Festival. With his co-writer Vincent Poymiro, Harari won Best Original Screenplay at the 47th César Awards.

He was a co-writer of the film Anatomy of a Fall (2023), which won numerous awards for Best Original Screenplay, including the Academy Award for Best Original Screenplay.

In June 2024, Harari was invited to become a member of the Academy of Motion Picture Arts and Sciences.

Harari's The Unknown (2026), a psychological fantasy film starring Léa Seydoux, was based in the graphic novel Le cas David Zimmerman, which Arthur co-wrote with his brother Lucas Harari.

had its world premiere in the main competition of the 2026 Cannes Film Festival, where it competed for the Palme d'Or. It was theatrically released in France by Pathé, while Neon picked up the North American rights.

== Personal life ==
Harari is the grandson of the Egyptian-French actor Clément Harari. His older brother, Tom, is a cinematographer. His younger brother, Lucas, is a graphic novelist. Harari is Jewish.

Harari is in a relationship with director Justine Triet, with whom he has two children. Harari co-wrote the screenplays for her films Sibyl (2019) and Anatomy of a Fall (2023), the latter of which received the Palme d'Or at the 2023 Cannes Film Festival.

=== Political beliefs ===
In December 2023, alongside 50 other filmmakers, Harari signed an open letter published in Libération demanding a ceasefire and an end to the killing of civilians amid the 2023 Israeli invasion of the Gaza Strip, and for a humanitarian corridor into Gaza to be established for humanitarian aid, and the release of hostages. At the 29th Lumière Awards ceremony on 22 January 2024, Harari commented that he was "disgusted by what the Israeli government is doing in Gaza". He also condemned the 7 October Hamas-led attack on Israel but further "argued that the responsibility to end the war in Gaza lies with the Israeli leadership".

== Filmography ==
=== Feature film ===
Year	English title	Original title	Notes	Ref.
2015	Dark Inclusion	Diamant noir	Co-written with Vincent Poymiro and Agnès Feuvre	
2021	Onoda: 10,000 Nights in the Jungle	Onoda, 10 000 nuits dans la jungle	Co-written with Vincent Poymiro	
2026	The Unknown	L'Inconnue	Co-written with Lucas Harari and Vincent Poymiro	

==== Only screenwriter ====
Year	Title	Notes
2016	Manodopera	Short film; co-written with Loukianos Moshonas
2019	Sibyl	Co-written with Justine Triet
2023	Anatomy of a Fall	Co-written with Justine Triet

=== Short films ===
Year	Title
2005	Des jours dans la rue
2006	Le Petit
2007	La Main sur la gueule
2013	Peine perdue

=== Acting credits ===
Year	Title	Role	Director	Notes	Ref.
2010	La République	Énarque 3	Nicolas Pariser	Short film	
2011	Panexlab		Olivier Seror	Medium-length film	
2012	La Grève des ventres	Alexandre	Lucie Borleteau	Short film	
2013	Age of Panic	Arthur	Justine Triet		
2014	Think of Me	Guard	Shanti Masud	Short film	
2014	La Nuit tombe		Benjamin Papin	Short film	
2015	Dix-sept ans pour toujours	Clément	Aurélia Morali	Short film	
2015	Dark Inclusion	Policier Paris	Arthur Harari		
2016	Le Dieu bigorne	Le père de Vinca	Benjamin Papin	Medium-length film	
2016	In Bed with Victoria	Le dresseur de chimpanzé	Justine Triet		
2017	Le lion est mort ce soir	Le projectionniste	Nobuhiro Suwa		
2019	Sibyl	Dr. Katz	Justine Triet		
2023	The Goldman Case	Maître Georges Kiejman	Cédric Kahn		
2023	Anatomy of a Fall	Le critique littéraire	Justine Triet		

== Awards and nominations ==
Award	Date of ceremony	Category	Film	Result	Ref.
Academy Awards	10 March 2024	Best Original Screenplay (shared with Justine Triet)	Anatomy of a Fall	Won	
Austin Film Critics Association	10 January 2024	Best Original Screenplay (shared with Justine Triet)	Anatomy of a Fall	Nominated	
British Academy Film Awards	18 February 2024	Best Original Screenplay (shared with Justine Triet)	Anatomy of a Fall	Won	
British Independent Film Awards	3 December 2023	Best International Independent Film (shared with Justine Triet, Marie-Ange Luciani and David Thion)	Anatomy of a Fall	Won	
César Awards	24 February 2017	Best First Film	Dark Inclusion	Nominated	
César Awards	25 February 2022	Best Original Screenplay (shared with Vincent Poymiro)	Onoda: 10,000 Nights in the Jungle	Won	
César Awards	25 February 2022	Best Film	Onoda: 10,000 Nights in the Jungle	Nominated	
César Awards	25 February 2022	Best Director	Onoda: 10,000 Nights in the Jungle	Nominated	
César Awards	23 February 2024	Best Supporting Actor	The Goldman Case	Nominated	
César Awards	23 February 2024	Best Original Screenplay (shared with Justine Triet)	Anatomy of a Fall	Won	
Chicago Film Critics Association	12 December 2023	Best Original Screenplay (shared with Justine Triet)	Anatomy of a Fall	Nominated	
Dorian Awards	26 February 2024	Screenplay of the Year (shared with Justine Triet)	Anatomy of a Fall	Nominated	
Dorian Awards	26 February 2024	LGBTQ Screenplay of the Year (shared with Justine Triet)	Anatomy of a Fall	Nominated	
European Film Awards	9 December 2023	European Screenwriter (shared with Justine Triet)	Anatomy of a Fall	Won	
Florida Film Critics Circle	21 December 2023	Best Original Screenplay (shared with Justine Triet)	Anatomy of a Fall	Nominated	
Golden Globe Awards	7 January 2024	Best Screenplay (shared with Justine Triet)	Anatomy of a Fall	Won	
Gold Derby Film Awards	21 February 2024	Best Original Screenplay (shared with Justine Triet)	Anatomy of a Fall	Won	
Gotham Awards	27 November 2023	Best Screenplay (shared with Justine Triet)	Anatomy of a Fall	Won	
Jacques Deray Prize	4 March 2017	Best French Policier Film of the Year	Dark Inclusion	Won	
London Film Critics' Circle	4 February 2024	Screenwriter of the Year (shared with Justine Triet)	Anatomy of a Fall	Won	
Louis Delluc Prize	12 January 2022	Best Film	Onoda: 10,000 Nights in the Jungle	Won	
Lumière Awards	30 January 2017	Best First Film	Dark Inclusion	Nominated	
Lumière Awards	17 January 2022	Best Film	Onoda: 10,000 Nights in the Jungle	Nominated	
Lumière Awards	17 January 2022	Best Director	Onoda: 10,000 Nights in the Jungle	Nominated	
Lumière Awards	17 January 2022	Best Screenplay	Onoda: 10,000 Nights in the Jungle	Nominated	
Lumière Awards	22 January 2024	Best Male Revelation	The Goldman Case	Nominated	
Lumière Awards	22 January 2024	Best Screenplay (shared with Justine Triet)	Anatomy of a Fall	Won	
Magritte Awards	12 February 2022	Best Foreign Film in Coproduction	Onoda: 10,000 Nights in the Jungle	Nominated	
San Diego Film Critics Society	19 December 2023	Best Original Screenplay (shared with Justine Triet)	Anatomy of a Fall	Nominated	
San Francisco Bay Area Film Critics Circle	9 January 2024	Best Original Screenplay (shared with Justine Triet)	Anatomy of a Fall	Nominated	
Satellite Awards	18 February 2024	Best Screenplay, Original (shared with Justine Triet)	Anatomy of a Fall	Nominated	
Syndicat Français de la Critique de Cinéma	22 February 2022	Best French Film	Onoda: 10,000 Nights in the Jungle	Won	
Toronto Film Critics Association	17 December 2023	Best Original Screenplay (shared with Justine Triet)	Anatomy of a Fall	Runner-up	
Vancouver Film Critics Circle	12 February 2024	Best Screenplay (shared with Justine Triet)	Anatomy of a Fall	Nominated	
Washington D.C. Area Film Critics Association	10 December 2023	Best Original Screenplay (shared with Justine Triet)	Anatomy of a Fall	Nominated	
