= Aldo Brizzi =

- Born: Alessandria, Italy
- Genres: Classical, contemporary
- Occupations: Composer, conductor
- Website: papermine.com/user/aldo-brizzi/

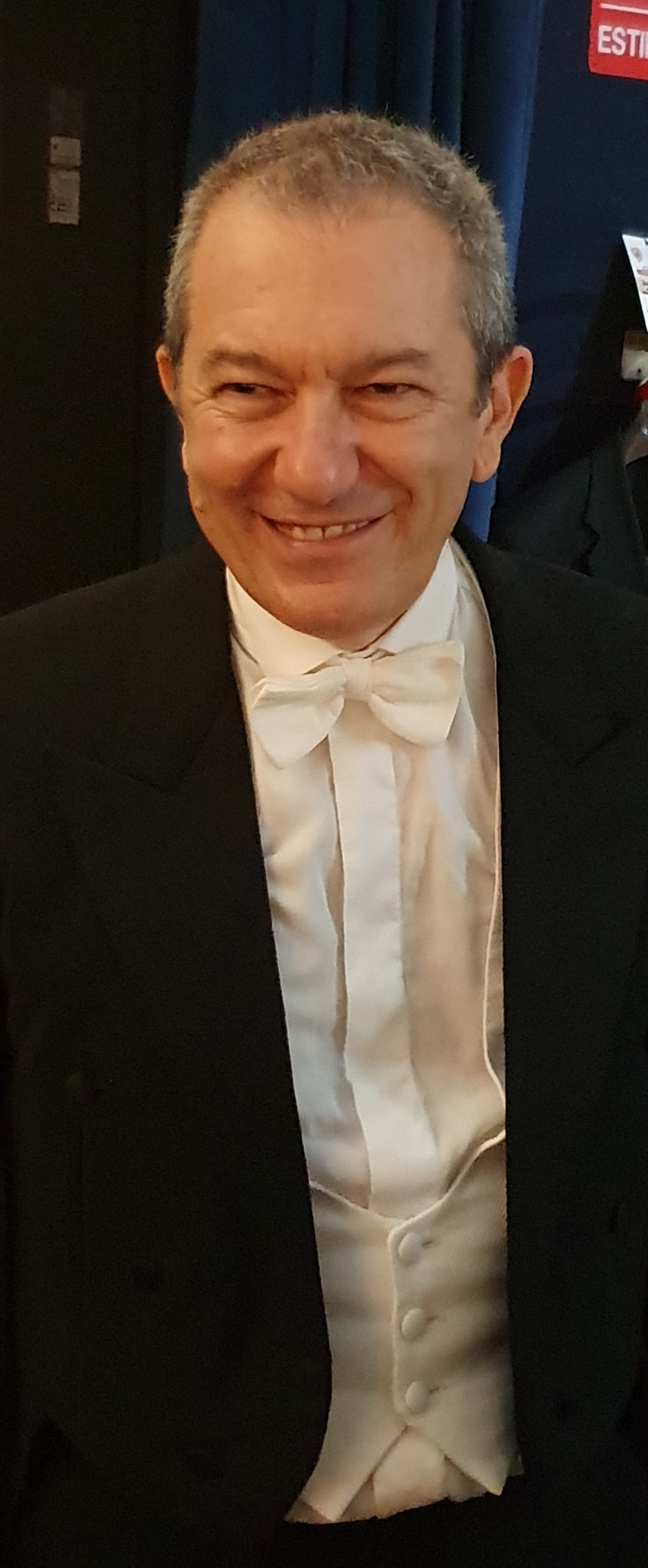

Aldo Brizzi is an Italian composer and conductor.

== Biography ==
Brizzi was born in Alessandria, Italy, in 1960. He studied piano, viola and composition at the Giuseppe Verdi Conservatory in Milan and later graduated in DAMS from the University of Bologna.

As a composer and conductor, he has worked between Europe and Brazil. In 2016, he founded the Núcleo de Ópera da Bahia in Salvador.

His stage works include Gabriel et Gabriel, performed at the Opéra de Tours in November 2015.

He also composed Jelin, an opera in two acts, which premiered at the Teatro Alessandrino in Alessandria on 17 September 2021.

Brizzi collaborated with Gilberto Gil on Amor Azul, an opera co-written by the two musicians and performed at the Auditorium de Radio France in Paris in December 2022. The production was presented in concerts on 2, 3 and 4 December 2022 by the Chœur de Radio France and the Orchestre Philharmonique de Radio France, with Brizzi conducting.

In 2025, he co-composed the opera I-Juca Pirama with Gilberto Gil, with a libretto by Paulo Coelho. The work received its world premiere at the Theatro da Paz in Belém on 10 November 2025, with further performances on 11 and 12 November, as part of the XXIV Festival de Ópera do Theatro da Paz.

== Discography ==
- The Labyrinth Trial (1999), featuring Maurizio Barbetti, Brake drum percussion, Francesco Cuoghi, Massimo Agostinelli, Ensemble Orphée; Rara-Kho, Italy
- Brizzi do Brasil (2002), featuring Ala dos Namorados, Arnaldo Antunes, Augusto de Campos, Carlinhos Brown, Caetano Veloso, Gilberto Gil, Margareth Menezes, Olodum, Teresa Salgueiro, Tom Zé, Virgínia Rodrigues and Zeca Baleiro; Eldorado Sony, Brazil
- Aço do Açúcar (2005), Graça Reis, vocals and Aço do Açúcar; ACOACO4001, Brazil
- Obrigado (2006) by Teresa Salgueiro featuring Aldo Brizzi; EMI
- Reis (2008) EP, Graça Reis, vocals / Aldo Brizzi, electronics; WorldMediaVision, Mexico
- Vela (2016) for saxophones and 3 ensembles, soloist Daniel Kientzy: Nova Musica, France
- Holos (2021) Raghunath Manet) 2021; Magic & Unique Group / Musica Presente, Los Angeles/Italy
- Oratório de Santo Antônio (2022), for soprano, mezzo, tenor, bass, chorus and 4 instruments. Núcleo de Ópera da Bahia; Musica Mundi, Brazil

== Bibliography ==
=== Aldo Brizzi writings ===
- "Nostro", in Proposte musicali, Edizioni del Centro Musicale Fiorentino, Firenze (1980)
- "Musica e ideologia", in Aldo Brizzi - Renzo Cresti, La musica, le idee, le cose, Edizioni del Centro Musicale Fiorentino, Firenze (1981)
- "My visits to Via San Teodoro", in I suoni, le onde... n. 2, Fondazione Isabella Scelsi, Roma (1991)
- "Giacinto Scelsi", in Pierre Albert Castanet - Nicola Cisternino, Viaggio al centro del suono, Luna Editore, La Spezia (1992)
- "Wahrnehmung von Sinn und Zeichen im Lied" in Heinrich Heine von Dichtung un Musik, Hugo-Wolf Akademie, Tutzing (1996) ISBN 3 7952 0834 3
- "Scelsi", in Von Krachnistein zu Gegenwart, Daco Verlag, Stoccarda (1996) ISBN 3-87135-028-1
- "L'intimità rituale del gesto esecutivo", in I suoni, le onde... n. 21, Fondazione Isabella Scelsi, Roma (2008)
- "Il progetto musicale" in Valerio Berruti, Dove il cielo s'attacca alla collina, Silvana Editoriale, Milano (2013)
- "Le sorgenti inudibili del suono" The espectral music by Horatiu Radulescu, English version by Chiara Calabrese, Fiorenzo Bernasconi editore, (2022)ISBN 979-8441193153

=== Writings about Aldo Brizzi ===
- Renzo Cresti, "Aldo Brizzi, avvelenamento del linguaggio", in Rivista Pasquino musicale n. 7, Latina 1992
- Augusto de Campos, "Nóva Música: Brizzi do Brasil" in Música de Inveção 2, Editora Perspectiva, São Paulo (Brazil) (2016) ISBN 9788527310505
- Augusto de Campos, "Aldo Brizzi, na Bahia" in A prova do labirinto, in the concert program of Teatro Rivoli, Oporto (April 2000)
- Flora Süssekind, "Nota sobre "ão" in Sobre Augusto de Campos, pp. 140–160, Viveiros de Castro Editora, Rio de Janeiro (2004) I>SBN 85-7577-134-5
- Renzo Cresti, "Avvelenamenti, labirinti, musiche del mondo" in Sito dedicato alla musica contemporanea, Lucca 2012
- Jorge Alfredo Guimarães, "A porta do labirinto" in Caderno de Cinema, (23-2-2013), Brazil
- Renzo Cresti, "Una girandola di presenti" in Musica presente, LIM, Lucca (2019) ISBN 978-88-5543-001-2
- Valerio Sebastiani, "Musica libera e realismo magico" in Quinte parallele, rivista digitale, Roma, November 26, 2019
- Antonella Vicini, "Let the music speak" in The Badger n. 6, pagg. 116–123, 2020
