= Sibyl (2019 film) =

2019 film by Justine Triet

- Theatrical release poster
- Directed by: Justine Triet
- Written by: Justine Triet; Arthur Harari
- Produced by: David Thion; Philippe Martin
- Starring: Virginie Efira; Adèle Exarchopoulos; Gaspard Ulliel; Sandra Hüller; Laure Calamy; Niels Schneider; Paul Hamy; Arthur Harari
- Cinematography: Simon Beaufils
- Edited by: Laurent Sénéchal
- Production companies: Les Films Pelléas; France 2 Cinéma; Les Films de Pierre; Page 114; Auvergne Rhône-Alpes Cinéma; Scope Pictures
- Distributed by: Le Pacte (France); Telescope (Belgium)
- Release dates: 24 May 2019 (Cannes); 24 May 2019 (France and Belgium)
- Running time: 100 minutes
- Countries: France; Belgium
- Language: French
- Budget: €6.6 million ($7.2 million)
- Box office: $2.9 million

Sibyl is a 2019 comedy-drama film directed by Justine Triet from a screenplay she co-wrote with Arthur Harari, and starring Virginie Efira, Adèle Exarchopoulos and Gaspard Ulliel, in his final film to be released theatrically during his lifetime. The film is a co-production between France and Belgium and was selected to compete for the Palme d'Or at the 2019 Cannes Film Festival.

== Plot ==
Sibyl is a psychotherapist who returns to her first passion: writing. Her newest patient, Margot, is a troubled up-and-coming actress, who proves to be too tempting a source of inspiration. Fascinated almost to the point of obsession, Sibyl becomes more and more involved in Margot's tumultuous life.

== Cast ==
- Virginie Efira as Sibyl
- Adèle Exarchopoulos as Margot Vasilis
- Gaspard Ulliel as Igor Maleski
- Sandra Hüller as Mikaela "Mika" Sanders
- Laure Calamy as Édith
- Niels Schneider as Gabriel
- Paul Hamy as Étienne
- Arthur Harari as Dr. Katz
- Adrien Bellemare as Daniel
- Jeanne Arra-Bellanger as Selma
- Liv Harari as Livia
- Lorenzo Lefebvre as Galotin
- Aurélien Bellanger as the editor

== Production ==
Filming took place in Paris, in studios located in Lyon and on the Italian island of Stromboli.

== Reception ==
=== Critical response ===
Sibyl received mixed reviews from critics. On the review aggregator website Rotten Tomatoes, 57% of 54 critics' reviews are positive, with an average rating of 5.9/10. The website's consensus reads: "Intriguing yet uneven, Sibyl is just about held together by its leads, but too often pits great performances against frustrating filmmaking." Metacritic, which uses a weighted average, assigned the film a score of 59 out of 100, based on 16 critics, indicating "mixed or average" reviews.

AlloCiné, a French cinema site, gave the film an average rating of 3.7/5, based on a survey of 23 French reviews.

=== Awards and nominations ===
Year	Award	Category	Recipient(s)	Result	Ref.
2019	Cannes Film Festival	Palme d'Or	Justine Triet	Nominated	
2019	Philadelphia Film Festival	Best Narrative Feature	Justine Triet	Nominated	
