= List of Israeli films of 2014 =

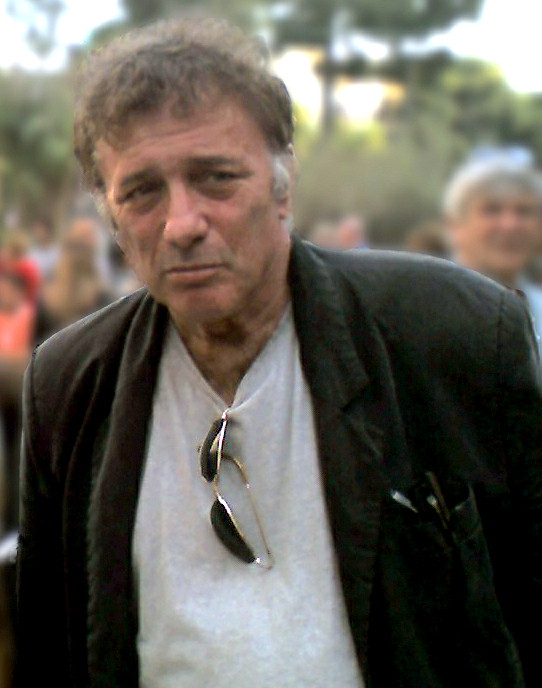
2014 saw the death of Assi Dayan.

The Israeli film industry produced over forty feature films in 2014. This article fully lists all non-pornographic films, including short films, that had a release date in that year and which were at least partly made by Israel. It does not include films first released in previous years that had release dates in 2014.
Also included is an overview of the major events in Israeli film, including film festivals and awards ceremonies, as well as lists of those films that have been particularly well received, both critically and financially.

== Major releases ==
Opening		Title	Cast and Crew	Studio	Genre(s)	Ref.
J A N U A R Y	1	Yona	Director: Nir Bergman; Cast: Naomi lvov		Drama	
A P R I L	17	Zero Motivation	Director: Talya Lavie; Cast: Dana Ivgy		Comedy; Drama	
M A Y	1	Orange People	Director: Hanna Azoulay Hasfari		Drama	
M A Y	15	That Lovely Girl	Director: Keren Yedaya		Drama	
M A Y	16	Gett: The Trial of Viviane Amsalem	Directors: Ronit Elkabetz, Shlomi Elkabetz; Cast: Ronit Elkabetz, Menashe Noy, Sasson Gabai, Simon Abkarian	Les Films du Losange	Drama	
M A Y	16	Self Made	Director: Shira Geffen; Cast: Sarah Adler, Samira Saraya, Doraid Liddawi		Drama	
M A Y	22	Next to Her	Director: Asaf Korman; Cast: Dana Ivgy		Drama	
J U L Y	14	Princess	Director: Tali Shalom Ezer; Cast: Shira Haas, Ori Pfeffer, Keren Mor, Adar Zohar-Hanetz	Maker Films	Drama	
J U L Y	22	Schnitzel	Director: Asaf Epstein; Cast: Neveh Tzur, Olga Bardukov, Arik Mishali, Nir Malik, Adi Feldman		Sci-Fi, Comedy, Short	
S E P T E M B E R	1	Tsili	Director: Amos Gitai; Cast: Sarah Adler, Meshi Olinski, Lea Koenig, Adam Tsekhman, Andrey Kashkar	Epicentre Films	Drama	
S E P T E M B E R	10	The Kindergarten Teacher	Director: Nadav Lapid		Drama	
S E P T E M B E R	18	ABCs of Death 2	Directors: E. L. Katz, Julian Gilbey, Robert Morgan, Aharon Keshales, Navot Papushado, Jim Hosking, Bill Plympton, Erik Matti, Kristina Buožytė, Lancelot Oduwa Imasuen, Robert Boocheck, Larry Fessenden, Todd Rohal, Rodney Ascher, Jen Soska, Sylvia Soska, Vincenzo Natali, Steven Kostanski, Julien Maury, Alexandre Bustillo; Cast: Tristan Risk, Béatrice Dalle	Magnet Releasing	Horror; Comedy	
O C T O B E R	2	Atlit	Director: Shirel Amitaï; Cast: Géraldine Nakache, Judith Chemla, Yaël Abecassis	Ad Vitam Distribution	Drama	
O C T O B E R	10	The Farewell Party	Directors: Tal Granit, Sharon Maymon; Cast: Ze'ev Revach		Drama	
N O V E M B E R	27	A Borrowed Identity	Director: Eran Riklis; Cast: Tawfeek Barhom		Drama	

== Notable Deaths ==
Month	Date	Name	Age	Nationality	Profession	Notable films
May	1	Assi Dayan	68	Israeli	Actor	A Walk with Love and Death; Promise at Dawn
August	8	Menahem Golan	85	Israeli	Director, Producer, Screenwriter	The Delta Force; Superman IV: The Quest for Peace

== See also ==
- 2014 in film
- 2014 in Israel
- Cinema of Israel
- List of Israeli submissions for the Academy Award for Best Foreign Language Film
