= 2004 Cannes Film Festival =

- Official poster of the 57th Cannes Film Festival featuring an illustration by Alerte Orange.
- Opening film: Bad Education
- Closing film: De-Lovely
- Location: Cannes, France
- Founded: 1946
- Awards: Palme d'Or: Fahrenheit 9/11
- Hosted by: Laura Morante
- No. of films: 19 (Main Competition)
- Festival date: 12 May 2004 – 23 May 2004
- Website: festival-cannes.com/en

Cannes Film Festival
- 2005 2003

The 57th Cannes Film Festival took place from 12 to 23 May 2004. American filmmaker Quentin Tarantino served as jury president for the main competition. While American filmmaker Michael Moore won the Palme d'Or for the documentary film Fahrenheit 9/11, becoming the first documentary to win the festival's main prize since The Silent World in 1956.

The festival opening film was Bad Education directed by Pedro Almodóvar, while De-Lovely directed by Irwin Winkler was the closing film. Laura Morante was mistress of the ceremonies.

2004 Un Certain Regard poster adapted from Marjane Satrapi's illustration.

== Juries ==
=== Main competition ===
- Quentin Tarantino, American filmmaker - Jury President
- Emmanuelle Béart, French actress and director
- Edwidge Danticat, Haitian-American novelist
- Tsui Hark, Hong Kong director
- Benoît Poelvoorde, Belgian actor
- Jerry Schatzberg, American director
- Tilda Swinton, British actress
- Kathleen Turner, American actress
- Peter von Bagh, Finnish film historian

=== Un Certain Regard ===
- Jeremy Thomas, British producer - Jury President
- Michel Demopoulos, Greek critic
- Carlos Gomez, Spanish critic
- Eric Libiot, French critic
- Baba Richerme, Italian journalist
- Eva Zaoralova, Czech artistic director of the Karlovy Vary International Film Festival

=== Cinéfondation and Short Films Competition ===
- Nikita Mikhalkov, Russian actor and filmmaker - Jury President
- Nuri Bilge Ceylan, Turkish filmmaker
- Marisa Paredes, Spanish actress
- Nicole Garcia, French actress and director
- Pablo Trapero, Argentinian director

=== Camera d'Or ===
- Tim Roth, British actor - Jury President
- Alberto Barbera, Italian film critic
- Nguyen Trong Binh, French distributor
- Alain Choquart, French cinematographer
- Isabelle Frilley, French representative of the technical industries
- Diego Galan, Spanish critic
- Laure Protat, French cinephile
- Aldo Tassone, Italian critic
- Anne Theron, French director

== Official Selection ==
=== In Competition ===
The following feature films competed for the Palme d'Or:

English title	Original title	Director(s)	Production Country
2046		Wong Kar-wai	Hong Kong, France, Italy, China, Germany
Clean		Olivier Assayas	France, United Kingdom, Canada
The Consequences of Love	Le conseguenze dell'amore	Paolo Sorrentino	Italy
The Edukators	Die fetten Jahre sind vorbei	Hans Weingartner	Austria, Germany
Exils		Tony Gatlif	France
Fahrenheit 9/11		Michael Moore	United States
Ghost in the Shell 2: Innocence	イノセンス, Inosensu	Mamoru Oshii	Japan
The Holy Girl	La niña santa	Lucrecia Martel	Argentina, Italy
The Ladykillers		Joel and Ethan Coen	United States
The Life and Death of Peter Sellers		Stephen Hopkins	United Kingdom, United States
Life Is a Miracle	Живот је чудо	Emir Kusturica	Serbia
Look at Me	Comme une image	Agnès Jaoui	France
The Motorcycle Diaries	Diarios de motocicleta	Walter Salles	Argentina, Brazil, United States, Chile, Peru
Mondovino		Jonathan Nossiter	United States
Nobody Knows	誰も知らない	Hirokazu Kore-eda	Japan
Oldboy	올드보이	Park Chan-wook	South Korea
Shrek 2		Andrew Adamson	United States
Tropical Malady	สัตว์ประหลาด	Apichatpong Weerasethakul	Thailand
Woman Is the Future of Man	여자는 남자의 미래다	Hong Sang-soo	South Korea

=== Un Certain Regard ===
The following films were selected for the competition of Un Certain Regard:

English title	Original title	Director(s)	Production country
10 on Ten		Abbas Kiarostami	Iran
Alexandria... New York	إسكندرية .. نيويورك	Youssef Chahine	Egypt, France
The Assassination of Richard Nixon		Niels Mueller	United States, Mexico
Crónicas		Sebastián Cordero	Ecuador, Mexico
Dear Frankie		Shona Auerbach	Scotland
Don't Move	Non ti muovere	Sergio Castellitto	Italy
Earth and Ashes	خاکستر و خاک	Atiq Rahimi	Afghanistan
Hotel		Jessica Hausner	Austria
In the Darkness of the Night	Noite Escura	João Canijo	Portugal
Kontroll		Nimród Antal	Hungary
Lightweight	Poids léger	Jean-Pierre Améris	France
Marseille		Angela Schanelec	Germany
Moolaadé		Ousmane Sembène	Senegal, France, Burkina Faso, Cameroon, Morocco, Tunisia
Nelly	À ce soir	Laure Duthilleul	France
Passages	路程	Yang Chao	China
Right Now	A Tout de Suite	Benoît Jacquot	France
Shiza		Gulshat Omarova	Kazakhstan, Russia, France, Germany
Somersault		Cate Shortland	Australia
Sword in the Moon	청풍명월	Kim Ui-seok	South Korea
Welcome to Switzerland	Bienvenue en Suisse	Léa Fazer	France, Switzerland
Whisky		Juan Pablo Rebella and Pablo Stoll	Argentina, Germany, Spain, Uruguay

=== Out of Competition ===
The following films were selected to be screened out of competition:

English title	Original title	Director(s)	Production country
The 10th District Court: Moments of Trials	10e chambre - Instants d'audience	Raymond Depardon	France
Bad Education (opening film)	La mala educación	Pedro Almodóvar	Spain
Bad Santa		Terry Zwigoff	United States
Born to Film	Cinéastes à tout prix	Frédéric Sojcher	France
Breaking News	大事件	Johnnie To	Hong Kong
Dawn of the Dead		Zack Snyder	United States, France, Japan
De-Lovely (closing film)		Irwin Winkler	United States
The Gate of Sun	باب الشمس	Yousry Nasrallah	Egypt, France
Five	پنج	Abbas Kiarostami	Iran
Glauber o Filme, Labirinto do Brasil		Silvio Tendler	Brazil
Henri Langlois: The Phantom of the Cinémathèque	Le fantôme d'Henri Langlois	Jacques Richard	France
House of Flying Daggers	十面埋伏	Zhang Yimou	China, Hong Kong
I Died in Childhood...	Я умер в детстве...	Georgi Paradzhanov	Russia
Kill Bill: The Whole Bloody Affair		Quentin Tarantino	United States
Notre musique		Jean-Luc Godard	France, Switzerland
Salvador Allende		Patricio Guzmán	Chile
Troy		Wolfgang Petersen	United States, United Kingdom, Mexico, Malta
Words in Progress	Épreuves d'artistes	Gilles Jacob	France
Z Channel: A Magnificent Obsession		Alexandra Cassavetes	United States

=== Cinéfondation ===
The following short films were selected for the competition of Cinéfondation:

- 99 ans de ma vie by Marja Mikkonen
- Beita Shel Meshoreret by Haim Tabakman
- Calatorie la oras by Corneliu Porumboiu
- Fajnie, że jesteś by Jan Komasa
- Footnote by Pia Borg
- Gaia by Amarante Abramovici
- Happy Now by Frederikke Aspöck
- Kis Apokrif N°2 by Kornél Mundruczó
- Kontakt by Martin Duda
- Nebraska by Olga Żurawska
- Playing Dead by David Hunt
- Propheties du passe by Fabien Greenberg
- Proyect Gvul by Tamar Singer, Dani Rosenberg, Nadav Lapid, Adi Halfin, Rima Essa
- Son Of Satan by Jj Villard
- The Happiness Thief by Derek Boyes
- The Rick by Tim McCarthy
- The Wings by Hae-young Seo
- Wonderful Harusame by Ayumi Aoyama

=== Short films Competition ===
The following short films competed for the Short Film Palme d'Or:

- Accordeon by Michèle Cournoyer
- Closer by David Rittey
- Flatlife by Jonas Geirnaert
- Gérard mon amour by Madeleine Andre
- L'evangile du cochon creole by Michelange Quay
- La derniere minute by Nicolas Salis
- Le nageur by Klaus Huettmann
- Quimera by Eryk Rocha
- Thinning the Herd by Rie Rasmussen
- Trafic by Cătălin Mitulescu

=== Cannes Classics ===
For the third year, the Cannes Festival selected "some of world cinema's masterpieces and rarities" for the audience. The following films were projected in the "Salle Buñuel" during the festival.

English title	Original title	Director(s)	Production country
Tributes
Black God, White Devil (1964)	Deus e o Diabo na Terra do Sol	Glauber Rocha	Brazil
Blowup (1966)		Michelangelo Antonioni	United Kingdom, Italy
Bye Bye Brazil (1979)	Bye Bye Brasil	Carlos Diegues	Brazil, France, Argentina
College (1927)		James W. Horne	United States
Dona Flor and Her Two Husbands (1976)	Dona Flor e seus dois maridos	Bruno Barreto	Brazil
Entranced Earth (1967)	Terra em transe	Glauber Rocha	Brazil
The Gaze of Michelangelo (short) (2004)	Lo sguardo di Michelangelo	Michelangelo Antonioni	Italy
The General (1926)		Buster Keaton and Clyde Bruckman	United States
Keeper of Promises (1964)	O Pagador de Promessas	Anselmo Duarte	Brazil
Macunaíma (1968)		Joaquim Pedro de Andrade	Brazil
Steamboat Bill, Jr. (1928)		Buster Keaton and Charles Reisner	United States
Vidas Secas (1963)		Nelson Pereira dos Santos	Brazil
Restored Prints
Amelie's Trip (1974)	Le voyage d'Amélie	Daniel Duval	France
The Battle of Algiers (1965)	La battaglia di Algeri	Gillo Pontecorvo	Italy, Algeria
Before the Revolution (1964)	Prima della rivoluzione	Bernardo Bertolucci	Italy
The Big Red One (1980)		Samuel Fuller	United States
Deadlier Than the Male (1966)		Ralph Thomas	United Kingdom
Hair (1979)		Miloš Forman	United States, West Germany
The Inner Scar (1967)	La cicatrice intérieure	Philippe Garrel	France
The Loneliness of the Long Distance Runner (1962)		Tony Richardson	United Kingdom
Mother India (1957)		Mehboob Khan	India
The New One-Armed Swordsman (1971)	新獨臂刀	Chang Cheh	Hong Kong
Ordet (1955)		Carl Theodor Dreyer	Denmark
Pickpocket (1959)		Robert Bresson	France

== Parallel Sections ==
=== International Critics' Week ===
The following films were screened for the 43rd International Critics' Week (43e Semaine de la Critique):

Competition

- À Casablanca les anges ne volent pas by Mohamed Asli (Morocco, Italy)
- Thirst (Atash) by Tawfik Abu Wael (Israel, Palestine)
- A Common Thread (Brodeuses) by Éléonore Faucher (France)
- Calvaire by Fabrice Du Welz (Belgium, France, Luxembourg)
- CQ2 (Seek You Too) by Carole Laure (Canada, France)
- Or (My Treasure) (Or) by Keren Yedaya (France, Israel)
- Duck season (Temporada de patos) by Fernando Eimbcke (Mexico)

Short Films Competition

- Alice and I (Alice et moi) by Micha Wald (Belgium)
- Breaking Out by Marianela Maldonado (United States)
- Con Diva (With Diva) by Sebastian Mantilla (Spain)
- The Man with No Shadow (L'homme sans ombre) by Georges Schwizgebel (Canada, Switzerland)
- Los elefantes nunca olvidan by Lorenzo Vigas (Venezuela, Mexico)
- Ryan by Chris Landreth (Canada)
- Signes de vie by Arnaud Demuynck (France, Belgium)

Special Screenings

- L'Après-midi de Monsieur Andesmas by Michelle Porte (France) (opening film)
- Adieu Philippine by Jacques Rozier (France) (La séance du Parrain)
- What Remains of Us (Ce qu’il reste de nous) by François Prévost & Hugo Latulippe (Canada) (Docu.)
- Metropolitan Express (Stolitchny Skory) by Artyom Antonov (Russia) (Short)
- Les Parallèles by Nicolas Saada (France) (Short)
- Girls and Cars by Thomas Woschitz (Austria) (Short)
- De l'autre côté by Nassim Amaouche (France) (Prix de la Critique)
- Anna (3 kgs 2) by Laurette Polmanss (France) (Prix de la Critique)
- Sotto falso nome by Roberto Andò (Italy, France, Switzerland) (closing film)

=== Directors' Fortnight ===
The following films were screened for the 2004 Directors' Fortnight (Quinzaine des Réalizateurs):

- A vot' bon cœur by Paul Vecchiali (France)
- Dans les champs de bataille by Danielle Arbid (France, Belgium, Lebanon)
- En attendant le déluge by Damien Odoul (France)
- The Heart Is Deceitful Above All Things (Le livre de Jérémie) by Asia Argento (United States, France, United Kingdom, Japan)
- The Hook (Je suis un assassin) by Thomas Vincent (France)
- Mean Creek by Jacob Aaron Estes (United States)
- Machuca by Andrés Wood (France, Spain, Chile)
- Los muertos by Lisandro Alonso (Argentina, France, Netherlands, Switzerland)
- Mur (doc.) by Simone Bitton (France, Israel)
- Oh, Uomo (doc.) by Yervant Gianikian, Angela Ricci Lucchi (Italy)
- The River's End by Behrouz Afkhami (Iran)
- The Scent of Blood (L'odore del sangue) by Mario Martone (Italy, France)
- Sommeil Amer by Mohsen Amiryoussefi (Iran)
- Tarnation (doc.) by Jonathan Caouette (United States)
- The Taste of Tea by Katsuhito Ishii (Japan)
- The Tunnel by Kunitoshi Manda (Japan)
- Vénus et Fleur by Emmanuel Mouret (France)
- Woman of Breakwater by Mario O'Hara (Philippines)
- The Woodsman by Nicole Kassell (United States)
- The Wound (La blessure) by Nicolas Klotz (France, Belgium)

Short Films

- A Feather Stare at the Dark by Naoyuki Tsuji (Japan)
- Capitaine Achab by Philippe Ramos (France)
- Charlotte by Ulrike Von Ribbeck (Germany)
- Fill in the Blanks by Kim Youn-Sung (South Korea)
- Frontier by Jun Miyazaki (Japan)
- La petite chambre by Élodie Monlibert (France)
- La peur, petit chasseur by Laurent Achard (France)
- Le dieu Saturne by Jean-Charles Fitoussi (France)
- Le droit chemin by Mathias Gokalp (France)
- Odya by Edgar Bartenev (Russia)
- Tristesse beau visage by Jean Paul Civeyrac (France)
- Vostok 1' by Jan Andersen (France)

== Official Awards ==
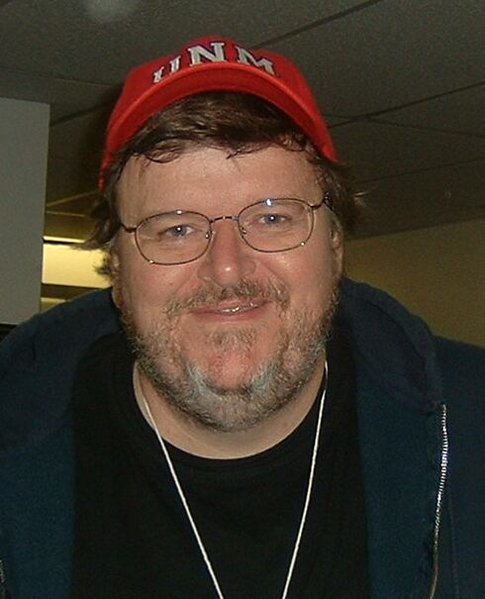
Michael Moore, 2004 Palme d'Or winner

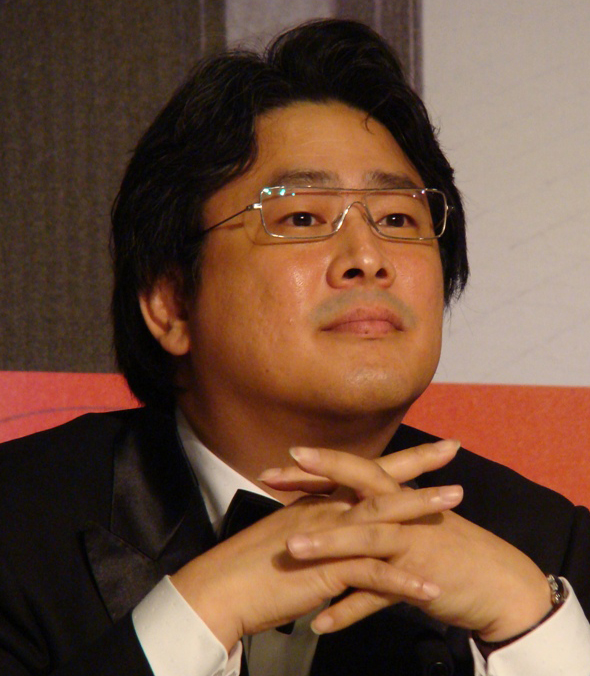
Park Chan-wook, Grand Prix winner

The following films and people received the 2004 Official selection awards:

=== Main Competition ===
- Palme d'Or: Fahrenheit 9/11 by Michael Moore
- Grand Prix: Oldboy by Park Chan-wook
- Best Director: Exils by Tony Gatlif
- Best Screenplay: Agnès Jaoui and Jean-Pierre Bacri for Look at Me
- Best Actress: Maggie Cheung for Clean
- Best Actor: Yūya Yagira for Nobody Knows
- Prix du Jury:
  - Tropical Malady by Apichatpong Weerasethakul
  - Irma P. Hall for The Ladykillers

=== Un Certain Regard ===
- Prix Un Certain Regard: Moolaadé by Ousmane Sembène
- Prix du Regard Original: Whisky by Juan Pablo Rebella and Pablo Stoll
- Prix du Regard vers l'Avenir: Earth and Ashes by Atiq Rahimi

=== Cinéfondation ===
- First Prize: Happy Now by Frederikke Aspöck
- Second Prize:
  - Calatorie la oras by Corneliu Porumboiu
  - 99 ans de ma vie by Marja Mikkonen
- Third Prize: Fajnie, że jesteś by Jan Komasa

=== Caméra d'Or ===
- Or (My Treasure) by Keren Yedaya
  - Special Mention:
    - Passages by Yang Chao
    - Earth and Ashes by Atiq Rahimi

=== Short Films Competition ===
- Short Film Palme d'Or: Trafic by Cătălin Mitulescu
- Short Film Jury Prize: Flatlife by Jonas Geirnaert

== Independent Awards ==
=== FIPRESCI Prizes ===
- Fahrenheit 9/11 by Michael Moore (In competition)
- Whisky by Juan Pablo Rebella and Pablo Stoll (Un Certain Regard)
- Thirst by Tawfik Abu Wael (International Critics' Week)

=== Vulcan Award of the Technical Artist ===
- Éric Gautier, cinematographer in Clean and The Motorcycle Diaries

=== Prize of the Ecumenical Jury ===
- The Motorcycle Diaries by Walter Salles
  - Special mention: Moolaadé by Ousmane Sembène

=== Award of the Youth ===
- Kontroll by Antal Nimród

=== Critics' Week ===
- International Critics' Week Grand Prix:
  - A Common Thread by Éléonore Faucher
  - Or (My Treasure) by Keren Yedaya
- Canal+ Award: Ryan by Chris Landreth
- Kodak Short Film Award: Ryan by Chris Landreth
- Young Critics Award - Best Short: Ryan by Chris Landreth
- Young Critics Award - Best Feature: Or (My Treasure) by Keren Yedaya
- Grand Golden Rail: CQ2 by Carole Laure
- Small Golden Rail: Alice and I by Micha Wald

=== François Chalais Award ===
- The Motorcycle Diaries by Walter Salles

== Media ==
- INA: Opening of the 2004 Festival (commentary in French)
- INA: Much publicity about the 2004 Palme d'Or (commentary in French)
