= Lumière Award for Best Male Revelation =

Annual French film award

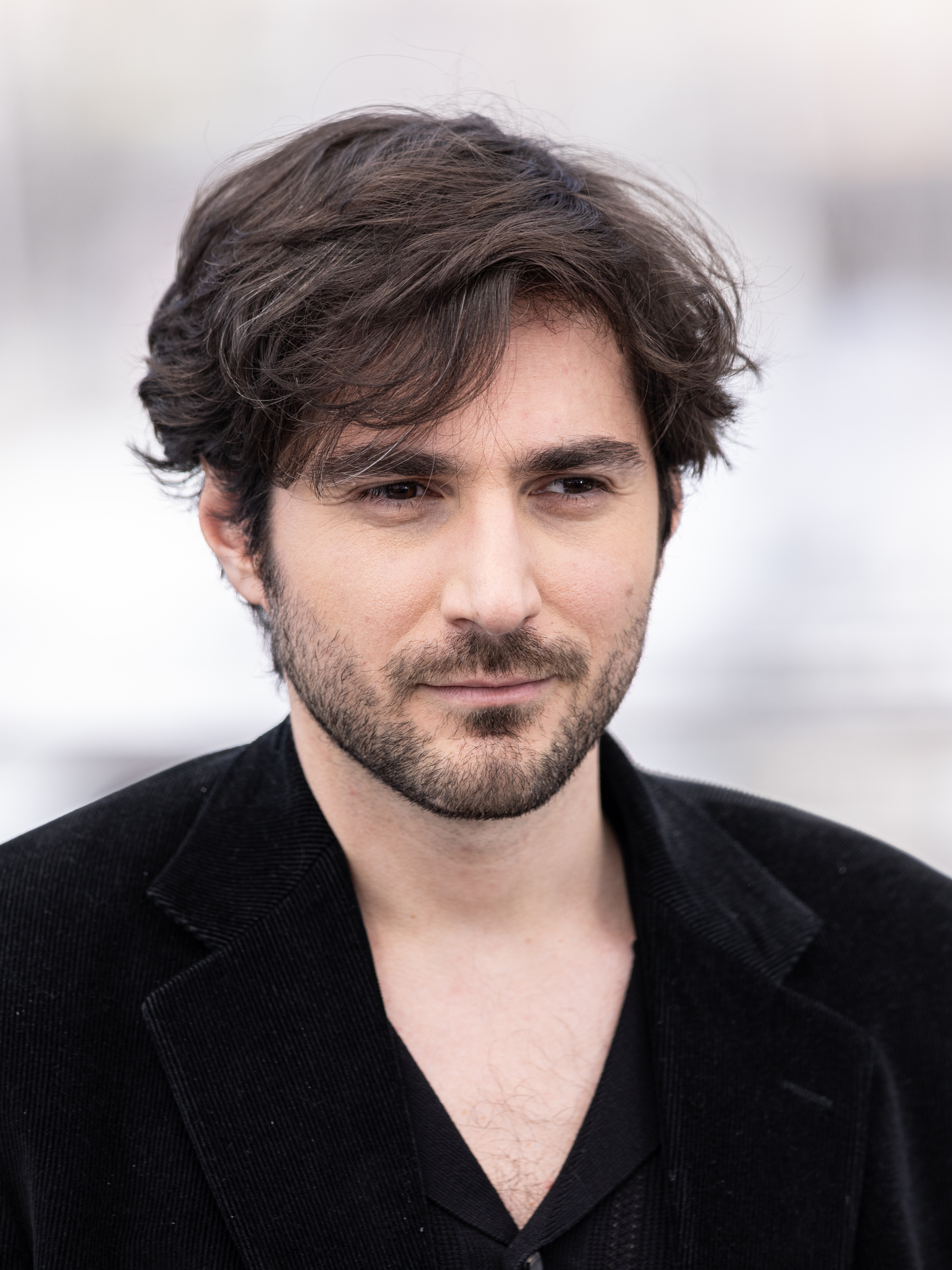
- 2026 recipient: Guillaume Marbeck
- Country: France
- Presented by: Académie des Lumières
- First award: 2000
- Currently held by: Guillaume Marbeck for Nouvelle Vague (2026)
- Website: academiedeslumieres.com

The Lumière Award for Best Male Revelation (French: Lumière de la révélation masculine) is an award presented annually by the Académie des Lumières since 2000.

It was presented as the Lumière du meilleur espoir masculin from 2000 to 2013. In English, the award was variously referred to as Most Promising Actor or Best Male Newcomer.

== Winners and nominees ==
Winners are listed first with a blue background, followed by the other nominees.

=== 2000s ===
| Year | Winner and nominees | English title | Original title |
|---|---|---|---|
| 2000 (5th) | Romain Duris | Peut-être | |
| 2001 (6th) | Jalil Lespert | Human Resources | Ressources humaines |
| 2002 (7th) | Abdel Halis | 17, rue Bleue | |
| 2003 (8th) | Gaspard Ulliel | Summer Things | Embrassez qui vous voudrez |
| 2004 (9th) | Grégori Derangère | Bon Voyage | |
| 2005 (10th) | Damien Jouillerot | Bad Spelling | Les Fautes d'orthographe |
| 2006 (11th) | Johan Libéreau | Cold Showers | Douches froides |
| 2007 (12th) | Julien Boisselier | Don't Worry, I'm Fine | Je vais bien, ne t'en fais pas |
| 2007 (12th) | Bernard Blancan | Days of Glory | Indigènes |
| 2007 (12th) | Jean-Louis Coulloc'h | Lady Chatterley | |
| 2007 (12th) | Malik Zidi | Les Amitiés maléfiques | |
| 2007 (12th) | Thibault Vinçon | Les Amitiés maléfiques | |
| 2008 (13th) | Jocelyn Quivrin | 99 francs | |
| 2008 (13th) | Kolia Litscher | Charly | |
| 2008 (13th) | Laurent Stocker | Hunting and Gathering | Ensemble, c'est tout |
| 2008 (13th) | Yannick Renier | Private Property | Nue Propriété |
| 2008 (13th) | Fu'ad Ait Aattou | The Last Mistress | Une vieille maîtresse |
| 2009 (14th) | Mohamed Bouchaïb | Masquerades | Mascarades |
| 2009 (14th) | Emile Berling | Behind the Walls | Les Hauts Murs |
| 2009 (14th) | François Civil | Dying or Feeling Better | Soit je meurs, soit je vais mieux |
| 2009 (14th) | Anton Balekdjian | Un monde à nous | |
| 2009 (14th) | Marco Cortes | Khamsa | |

=== 2010s ===
| Year | Winner and nominees | English title | Original title |
|---|---|---|---|
| 2010 (15th) | Vincent Lacoste | The French Kissers | Les Beaux gosses |
| 2010 (15th) | Anthony Sonigo | The French Kissers | Les Beaux gosses |
| 2010 (15th) | Samy Seghir | Neuilly sa mère! | |
| 2010 (15th) | Fırat Ayverdi | Welcome | |
| 2010 (15th) | Maxime Godart | Little Nicholas | Le Petit Nicolas |
| 2011 (16th) | Antonin Chalon | No et moi | |
| 2011 (16th) | Aymen Saïdi | Top Floor, Left Wing | Dernier étage, gauche, gauche |
| 2011 (16th) | Nahuel Perez Biscayart | Deep in the Woods | Au fond des bois |
| 2011 (16th) | Emile Berling | The Clink of Ice | Le Bruit des glaçons |
| 2011 (16th) | Jules Pelissier | Lights Out | Simon Werner a disparu... |
| 2012 (17th) | Denis Ménochet | The Adopted | Les Adoptés |
| 2012 (17th) | Guillaume Gouix | Jimmy Rivière | |
| 2012 (17th) | Grégory Gadebois | Angel & Tony | Angèle et Tony |
| 2012 (17th) | Raphaël Ferret | Guilty | Présumé coupable |
| 2012 (17th) | Mahmud Shalaby | Free Men | Les Hommes libres |
| 2013 (18th) | Ernst Umhauer | In the House | Dans la maison |
| 2013 (18th) | Stephane Soo Mongo | Hold Back | Rengaine |
| 2013 (18th) | Pierre Niney | Comme des frères | |
| 2013 (18th) | Mahmud Shalaby | A Bottle in the Gaza Sea | Une bouteille à la mer |
| 2013 (18th) | Clément Métayer | Something in the Air | Après Mai |
| 2014 (19th) | Raphaël Personnaz | The French Minister | Quai d'Orsay |
| 2014 (19th) | Raphaël Personnaz | Marius | |
| 2014 (19th) | Vincent Macaigne | The Rendez-Vous of Déjà-Vu | |
| 2014 (19th) | Pierre Deladonchamps | Stranger by the Lake | L'Inconnu du lac |
| 2014 (19th) | Niels Schneider | Chaos | Désordres |
| 2014 (19th) | Tewfik Jallab | The Marchers | La Marche |
| 2014 (19th) | Paul Hamy | Suzanne | |
| 2015 (20th) | Kévin Azaïs | Love at First Fight | Les Combattants |
| 2015 (20th) | Thomas Blumenthal | La Crème de la crème | |
| 2015 (20th) | Jean-Baptiste Lafarge | La Crème de la crème | |
| 2015 (20th) | Bastien Bouillon | High Society | Le Beau Monde |
| 2015 (20th) | Didier Michon | Fièvres | |
| 2015 (20th) | Pierre Rochefort | Going Away | Un beau dimanche |
| 2015 (20th) | Marc Zinga | May Allah Bless France! | Qu'Allah bénisse la France! |
| 2016 (21st) | Rod Paradot | Standing Tall | La Tête haute |
| 2016 (21st) | Stany Coppet | La Vie pure | |
| 2016 (21st) | Quentin Dolmaire | My Golden Days | Trois souvenirs de ma jeunesse |
| 2016 (21st) | Alban Lenoir | French Blood | Un Français |
| 2016 (21st) | Félix Moati | All About Them | À trois on y va |
| 2016 (21st) | Harmandeep Palminder | Young Tiger | Bébé Tigre |
| 2017 (22nd) | Damien Bonnard | Staying Vertical | Rester vertical |
| 2017 (22nd) | Corentin Fila | Being 17 | Quand on a 17 ans |
| 2017 (22nd) | Kacey Mottet Klein | Being 17 | Quand on a 17 ans |
| 2017 (22nd) | Finnegan Oldfield | Bang Gang (A Modern Love Story) | Bang Gang |
| 2017 (22nd) | Toki Pilioko | Mercenary | Mercenaire |
| 2017 (22nd) | Sadek | Tour de France | |
| 2017 (22nd) | Niels Schneider | Dark Inclusion | Diamant noir |
| 2018 (23rd) | Arnaud Valois | BPM (Beats per Minute) | 120 battements par minute |
| 2018 (23rd) | Khaled Alouach | De toutes mes forces | |
| 2018 (23rd) | Matthieu Lucci | The Workshop | L'Atelier |
| 2018 (23rd) | Nekfeu | All That Divides Us | Tout nous sépare |
| 2018 (23rd) | Finnegan Oldfield | Reinventing Marvin | Marvin ou la belle éducation |
| 2018 (23rd) | Pablo Pauly | Patients | |
| 2019 (24th) | Félix Maritaud | Sauvage | |
| 2019 (24th) | Anthony Bajon | The Prayer | La Prière |
| 2019 (24th) | William Lebghil | The Freshmen | Première année |
| 2019 (24th) | Andranic Manet | A Paris Education | Mes provinciales |
| 2019 (24th) | Dylan Robert | Shéhérazade | |

=== 2020s ===
| Year | Winner and nominees | English title | Original title |
|---|---|---|---|
| 2020 (25th) | Alexis Manenti | Les Misérables | |
| 2020 (25th) | Thomas Daloz | Particles | Les particules |
| 2020 (25th) | Tom Mercier | Synonyms | Synonymes |
| 2020 (25th) | Issa Perica | Les Misérables | |
| 2020 (25th) | Thimotée Robart | Burning Ghost | Vif-Argent |
| 2021 (26th) | Félix Lefebvre | Summer of 85 | Été 85 |
| 2021 (26th) | Benjamin Voisin | Summer of 85 | Été 85 |
| 2021 (26th) | Guang Huo | Night Ride | La nuit venue |
| 2021 (26th) | Djibril Vancoppenolle | Small Country: An African Childhood | Petit pays |
| 2021 (26th) | Alexandre Wetter | Miss | |
| 2021 (26th) | Jean-Pascal Zadi | Simply Black | Tout simplement noir |
| 2022 (27th) | Thimotée Robart | Magnetic Beats | Les Magnétiques |
| 2022 (27th) | Alseni Bathily | Gagarine | |
| 2022 (27th) | Abdel Bendaher | Ibrahim | |
| 2022 (27th) | Sami Outalbali | A Tale of Love and Desire | Une histoire d'amour et de désir |
| 2022 (27th) | Makita Samba | Paris, 13th District | Les Olympiades |
| 2023 (28th) | Dimitri Doré | Bruno Reidal, Confessions of a Murderer | Bruno Reidal |
| 2023 (28th) | Adam Bessa | Harka | |
| 2023 (28th) | Stefan Crepon | Peter von Kant | |
| 2023 (28th) | Paul Kircher | Winter Boy | Le Lycéen |
| 2023 (28th) | Aliocha Reinert | Softie | Petite Nature |
| 2024 (29th) | Raphaël Quenard | Junkyard Dog | Chien de la casse |
| 2024 (29th) | Arthur Harari | The Goldman Case | Le Procès Goldman |
| 2024 (29th) | Samuel Kircher | Last Summer | L'Été dernier |
| 2024 (29th) | Milo Machado-Graner | Anatomy of a Fall | Anatomie d'une chute |
| 2024 (29th) | Abdulah Sissoko | The Young Imam | Le Jeune Imam |
| 2025 (30th) | Clément Faveau | Holy Cow | Vingt Dieux |
| 2025 (30th) | Sayyid El Alami | And Their Children After Them | Leurs enfants après eux |
| 2025 (30th) | Malik Frikah | Beating Hearts | L'Amour ouf |
| 2025 (30th) | Félix Kysyl | Misericordia | Miséricorde |
| 2025 (30th) | Pierre Lottin | When Fall Is Coming | Quand vient l'automne |
| 2026 (31st) | Guillaume Marbeck | Nouvelle Vague | |
| 2026 (31st) | Idir Azougli | Meteors | Météors |
| 2026 (31st) | Younès Boucif | La Petite Cuisine De Mehdi | |
| 2026 (31st) | Théodore Pellerin | Nino | |
| 2026 (31st) | Eloy Pohu | Enzo | |

== See also ==
- César Award for Best Male Revelation
