= Mahmoud Shalaby =

Israeli actor (born 1982)

Mahmoud (or Mahmud) Shalaby, or Mahmood Shalabi (Arabic: محمود شلبي; Hebrew: מחמוד שלאבי or מחמוד שלבי; born 19 July 1982), is an Israeli Palestinian actor, rapper, and musician. He has acted in several films produced or co-produced in France and received the award for best male actor at the Film Festival of La Réunion in 2011 for the role of Naïm in the film A Bottle in the Gaza Sea, directed by Thierry Binisti and adapted from the novel Une bouteille dans la mer de Gaza by Valérie Zenatti. He was honored with two other awards at the same festival. He was a member of the Palestinian hip hop group MWR, which toured Palestine, Europe, and the United States.

== Life and career ==
Shalaby grew up in a poor neighborhood in Acre marked by urban violence. In 1998, he started the rap and hip-hop group, MWR, with his friends Waseem Aker, Richard Savo, and Charlie Shaabi. The lyrics in their songs often touched on the Palestinian struggle and the issues of drugs and crime in their society.

He was interviewed in 2008 in the documentary Slingshot Hip Hop by Jackie Reem Salloum, which covered Palestinian hip-hop in three geographic areas: Israel, the West Bank, and the Gaza Strip. Shalaby appeared in the documentary alongside the Palestinian hip hop group DAM, who he has frequently collaborated with musically.

Before beginning his acting career he managed a café. He was later contacted by director Keren Yedaya, who gave him his first role in a non-documentary film.

Shalaby played the role of Toufik in Jaffa, directed by Keren Yedaya and released in 2009, and the role of the Jewish-Algerian singer Salim Halali in Free Men, directed by Ismaël Ferroukhi and released in 2011.

In 2010, Shalaby appeared with Mohammad Bakri in an Arabic short film, The Clock and the Man (Arabic: الساعة والإنسان, Hebrew: השעון והאדם), adapted from a short story of the same name by the exiled Palestinian novelist Samira Azzam (1927-1967).

Shalaby also played Naim, a young Palestinian from Gaza, whose mother was played by Hiam Abbass, opposite a young Israeli woman, Tal, played by Agathe Bonitzer, in a film directed by Thierry Binisti, A Bottle in the Gaza Sea. The film was released in France on February 8, 2012.^{,} The film was inspired by a novel by Valérie Zenatti, Une bouteille dans la mer de Gaza.

In The Other Son by Lorraine Lévy, released in France on April 4, 2012, Shalaby played Bilal, ostensibly the brother of Yacine (Mehdi Dehbi), but in fact the brother of Joseph (Jules Sitruk), accidentally exchanged at birth in the confusion created by a bombing.

With an interest in Sufi music, Shalaby plays the kawala, a traditional Egyptian flute, that is seen and heard in The Other Son.

Shalaby was shortlisted in the category of Most Promising Actor for the 38th César Awards in 2013 for his appearance in A Bottle in the Gaza Sea.^{,}

In the 2016 film In Between, he played Ziad, the boyfriend of the film’s protagonist Leila, played by Mouna Hawa.

Shalaby describes himself as "an Israeli Palestinian".

== Filmography ==
- 2007: DAM (documentary), dir. Elliot Manches: himself
- 2008: Slingshot Hip Hop (documentary), dir. Jackie Reem Salloum: himself
- 2009: Jaffa, dir. Keren Yedaya: Toufik
- 2010: The Clock and the Man, dir. Gazi Abu Baker: Fathi
- 2011: Free Men, dir. Ismaël Ferroukhi: Salim Halali
- 2012: A Bottle in the Gaza Sea, dir. Thierry Binisti: Naïm
- 2012: The Other Son, dir. Lorraine Lévy: Bilal, brother of Yacine (as Mahmood Shalabi)
- 2014: Shkufim (Hebrew for "Transparents"), dir. Mushon Salmona: Raaid

== Awards ==
- Film Festival of La Réunion 2011: Best male actor ("Mascarin de la meilleure interprétation masculine") for the role of Naïm in A Bottle in the Gaza Sea (the film also won the "Prix du Public" and the "Prix Coup de cœur du Jury Jeune").
