= Amal Murkus =

Palestinian singer (born 1968)

- أمل مرقس
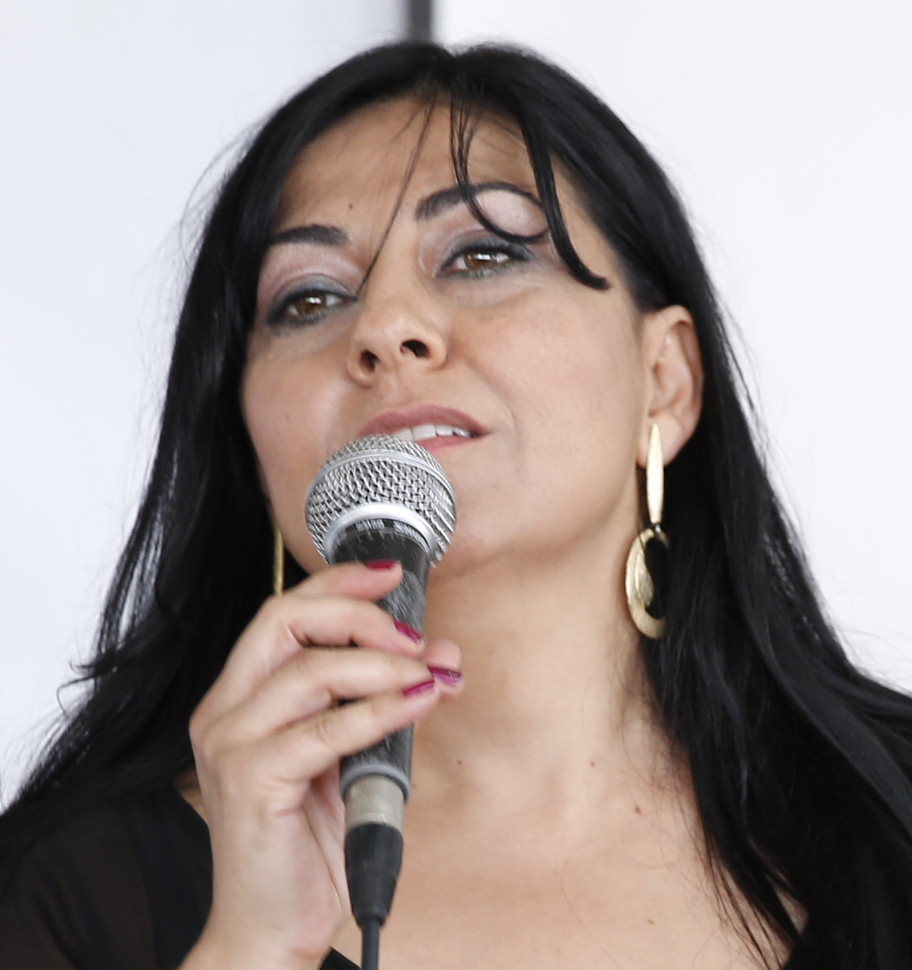
- Born: 1968 (age 57–58); Kafr Yasif, Northern District, Israel
- Occupations: Singer, producer, actress, radio host
- Spouse: Nizar Zreik
- Children: 2
- Website: www.amalmurkus.org

Amal Murkus (Arabic: أمل مرقس; Hebrew: אמל מורקוס) is an Israeli-Palestinian singer, actress, and producer.

Known for blending traditional Arabic music with international influences, she has developed an independent artistic career since the 1990s, producing her own work.

== Early life ==
Murkus was born in Kafr Yasif, an Arab town in the Galilee. She is one of six daughters of Nimer Murkus, a prominent member of the Israeli communist party and former mayor of Kafr Yasif. She began performing at a very young age, singing at Land Day and May Day gatherings that she attended with her parents. Being from an Arab town, she grew up primarily speaking Arabic, and only began speaking Hebrew out necessity when she gained attention from Israeli media and attended Hebrew-speaking education institutions.

== Career ==
=== Acting ===
Murkus graduated Beit Zvi School of the Performing Arts in 1990, and has worked in music, theatre, and media. In 1986, she performed a duet with Israeli musician Alon Oleartchik on the Hebrew-Arabic song "Shalom-Salam" on the annual Israeli musical children's show Festigal, which gained her considerable attention in Israeli media. In 1993, she appeared in two episodes of the short-lived Israeli TV series Neighbors, a sitcom based around interactions between Jewish and Arab neighbors in Israel. She also appeared on Rechov Sumsum, the Israeli version of Sesame Street. In 1997, she played a role in Ali Nassar's historical drama film The Milky Way, in which she was nominated for an Ophir Award. She won the Best Actress Award at the Haifa Theatre Festival in 2003. In 2009, she appeared in Basque singer and activist Fermin Muguruza's documentary Checkpoint Rock: Canciones desde Palestina.

In 2021, Murkus was in the drama film Cinema Sabaya, which won the Ophir Award for Best Feature Film and was later Israel's submission to the Academy Awards. In 2025, Murkus appeared as herself in Miya Hatav's film Annu, and co-starred in the short film I Know You Can Hear Me by Yousef Salhi.

=== Music ===
Murkus released her debut self-titled album, Amal, in 1998, with record label Highlights Music Ltd., and released internationally in 2000 with EMI Hemisphere. The album features contributions from Jewish and Arab musicians. After this album, Murkus began self-releasing her own albums since "not a single record company wanted [them]." Her next album, Shawq, was recorded live in the Jerusalem Theatre with the Jerusalem symphonic orchestra. Her 2007 album Na'na' ya Na'na' is composed of Arab folk music from the Galilee and Negev regions. Her next album, 2011's Baghanni was recorded at her home studio, and featured contributions from Arab and Celtic folk musicians. After the release of the album Fatah Al-Ward in 2016, Murkus took a hiatus until 2026, when she released Breathing with Italian composer Alessandro Sgobbio.

Musically, Murkus blends traditional Arab Maqamat music with international influence, including covers of Palestinian folk songs, music adapted from Arabic poets (such as Mahmoud Darwish), and original musical and lyrical compositions. Her music often addresses social issues, such as Palestinian political prisoners, freedom, women's rights, and homeland. She lists Joan Baez, Fairuz, Abdel Wahab, and Pyotr Ilyich Tchaikovsky as musical influences. She described her audience as mostly Palestinians that live within Israel, but is popular with residents of the West Bank and Gaza Strip.

In 2016, she made a guest appearance in Arab hip-hop group DAM's song "If I Could Go Back In Time" for the album Dabke on the Moon. In 2024, she was featured on Puerto-Rican rapper Residente's song "Bajo los Escombros" on the album Las Letras Ya No Importan, which gained Grammy recognition.

Outside of music, she hosted the radio show Raf al-Sitar ("Lifting the Curtain") on Ashams radio, the largest Arabic-language radio broadcast in Israel, for twelve years.

== Personal life ==
Murkus describes herself as a Marxist and feminist. She is married to Nizar Zreik, who has co-produced and co-written songs with her. She has two children, Yara Zreik, who is a singer and actress, and Firas Zreik, a musician and qanun-player who has performed onstage with Murkus.

== Discography ==
- Amal (1998)
- Shawq (2004)
- Na'na' ya Na'na' (2007)
- Baghanni (2011)
- Fatah al-Ward (2016)
- Breathing (2026)

== Selected works ==
- Exister es Resistir (2017)
- Nas (2020)
- Dola (2021)
- I Am From Here (2023)
- Bah’ri (2025)

== Awards ==
- Free Muse Award (2003)
- Excellent Media Personality Award (2011)

== Film ==
- Drab al-Tabanat (1996)
- The Milky Way (1997)
- Cinema Sabaya (2021)
