= Schnitzel (disambiguation) =

Schnitzel is a boneless meat dish.

Schnitzel may also refer to:

- Schnitzel (film), Israeli short film
- Shnitzel (also spelled Schnitzel), a character from the TV series Chowder
