= Shez =

Israeli author and poet

- שז
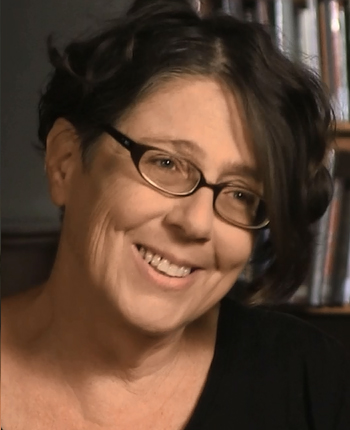
- Shez in 2014
- Born: Efrat Yerushalmi; October 30, 1959; Kiryat Ono, Israel
- Occupations: Writer, poet, playwright, musician, songwriter
- Writing career
- Notable works: The Crazy Dance, Away From His Absence
- Notable awards: Ron Adler Prize for Poetry (1999), Prime Minister's Prize for Hebrew Literary Works (2007), Hero of Culture Award from the Israeli LGBT community (2004)
- The song "Mom" from the album Crazy Dance

Shez (Shaz, Hebrew: שז; born Efrat Yerushalmi, 30 October 1959) is an Israeli writer, poet and playwright. Recipient of the 1999 Ron Adler Prize for Poetry and the 2007 Prime Minister's Prize for Hebrew Literary Works. She is also a musician and a songwriter, described as "the first out lesbian performer in Israel". More recently she has become a facilitator of writing workshops and "weight loss through writing" workshops.

== Early life ==
Shez was born in Kiryat Ono to Avraham and Ada Yerushalmi. She was subject to incest, reflected in her poems and books. Trying to distance herself from the past, she changed her name ("Shez" is a Hebrew contraction of Shem Zmani (Hebrew: שם זמני), "temporary name") at the age of 25.

Shez studied theatre at Thelma Yellin School.

== Creative career ==
Shez is described as a "provocative and extroverted lesbian" and her poetry is "outrageous, blunt and violent and leaves not even a narrow crack for sentimentality and compassion".

=== Albums ===
- 2002: Crazy Dance, music album based on the 1999 book
- 2020: להחזיר את הפיות (Return the Fairies) a music album in cooperation with Jonathan Bar Giora, released by Helicon Records

=== Books ===
- 1996: White Pearl Necklace, a play about childhood sexual abuse
- 1999: The Crazy Dance (ריקוד המשוגעת) - songs
- 2001: Returning the Fairies to Eretz Israel: A Fake Autobiographical Novel (להחזיר את הפיות לארץ-ישראל)
- 2005" Tamed (מאולפת) - stories
- 2010: Away From His Absence (הרחק מהיעדרו), Am Oved Publishing. Written in the first person, it is a novel about the incestuous relationship between a father and a daughter. A screenplay by Keren Yedaya based on the book was chosen to take part in a Jerusalem Film Festival. Eventually, it resulted in the 2014 Israeli-French drama film with English title That Lovely Girl, screened at the 2014 Cannes Film Festival to compete in the section Un Certain Regard.

== Awards ==
- 2007 Prime Minister's Prize for Hebrew Literary Works.
- 2004: Hero of Culture Award from the Israeli LGBT community
- 1999 Ron Adler Prize for Poetry
