= Neta Elkayam =

Israeli singer (born 1980)

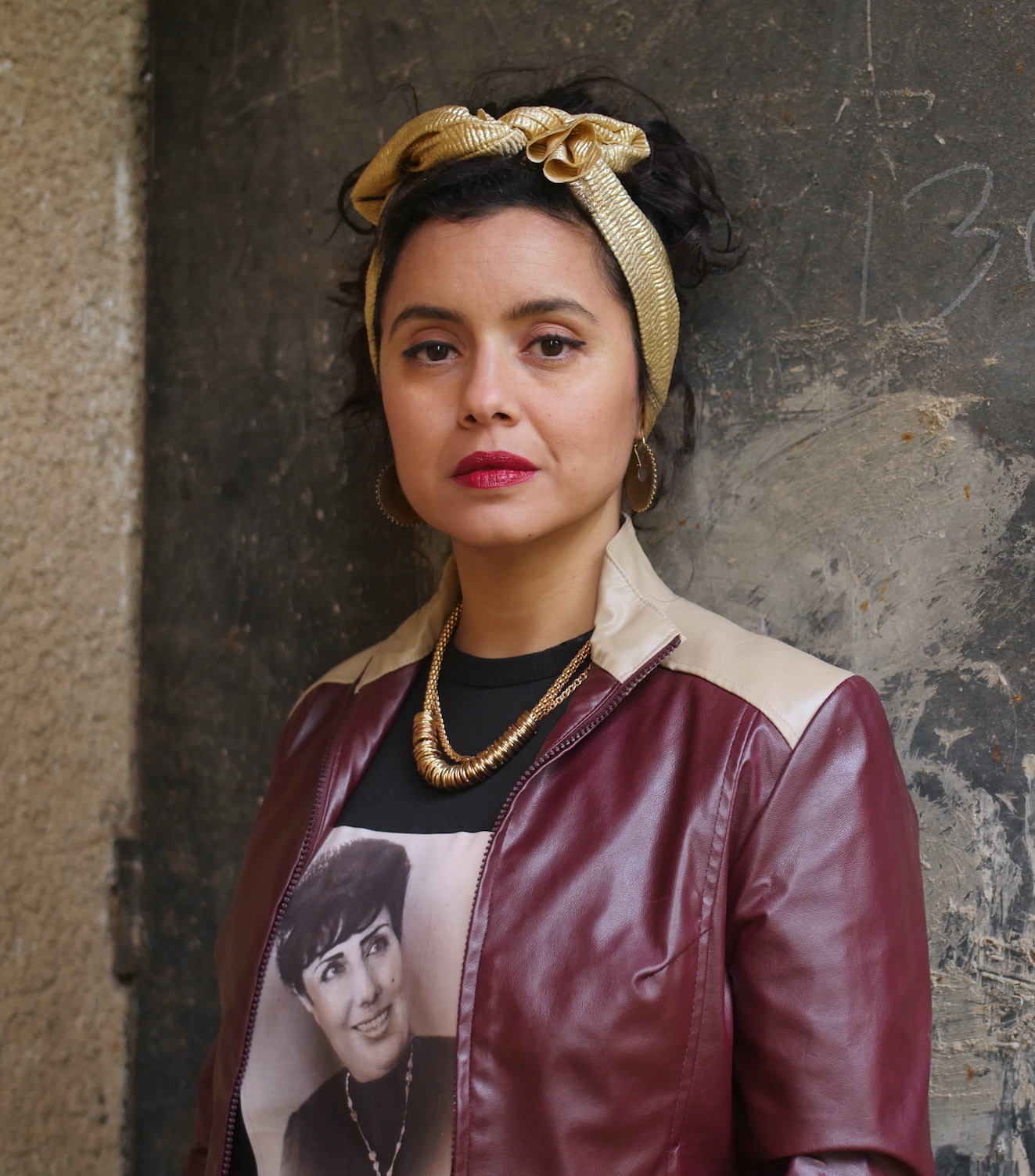
- Born: 1980 (age 45–46); Netivot, Israel
- Citizenship: Israel, Moroccan
- Occupations: Singer-songwriter, visual artist
- Years active: 2013-present
- Style: Moroccan-Jewish music, traditional music from the Maghreb with pop and jazz influence
- Partner: Amit Hai Cohen
- Website: netaelkayam.com

Neta Elkayam (Hebrew: נטע אלקיים, Arabic: نيتا إلكايام; born in Netivot) is a Moroccan-Israeli singer-songwriter, composer and visual artist of Moroccan Jewish heritage. She is known for her interpretations of the Moroccan traditional musical heritage, including by popular 20th-century Jewish-Moroccan singer Zohra Al Fassiya.

== Biography ==
Elkayam's grandparents emigrated to Israel from Casablanca and Tinghir. She was born in 1980 and raised in Netivot, a city in southern Israel with a large community of Moroccan-Jewish immigrants. Her grandmother had immigrated to Israel with four children at the age of 40 in 1956. Inspired by Moroccan songs performed at family gatherings, she learned Moroccan Arabic and explored her Moroccan roots. In a 2021 interview, she said interpreting Moroccan Jewish music in Israel was not well received, but this was changing.

With her husband, musician Amit Hai Cohen, himself of Jewish-Berber background from Ouarzazate, she visited Morocco, where both participated in the documentary film about the emigration of Moroccan Jews to Israel In Your Eyes, I See My Country. The couple live in Jerusalem and New Orleans, US. In 2024, Elkayat obtained Moroccan citizenship.

== Career ==
=== Music ===
Elkayat started singing in her primary school choir. While studying in an ulpana as a teenager, her music teacher, a classical guitarist from India, exposed her to classical music, jazz, black music, and opera. She also became interested in Pink Floyd and heavy metal. She credits her grandmother with introducing her to Moroccan music. Elkayam is known for her interpretations of the songs of Jewish singers from the Maghreb; and she has named Zohra Al Fassiya, Line Monty and Reinette L'Oranaise as influences. In Morocco, she has performed at the Festival des Andalousies Atlantiques at Essaouira and has noted her friendly relationships with young Moroccans. The New York Times noted that she "sings to heal the wounds of exile."

Asked why she chose the Moroccan-Jewish musical heritage, she responded:

I liked the fact that this music was not mainstream in Israel. I loved the multiple identities of the Jewish musicians who lived and worked in Morocco ... They were culturally richer than we, the young Moroccans in Israel. So I wanted to integrate these "musical treasures" into my art, to merge them with Western styles that are also a part of me, so that they can continue to live in our contemporary culture. I wanted to transform the culture that was excluded from the history and art books I studied in school, into a living culture!

In 2013, Elkayam performed in her Katamon neighborhood of Jerusalem as part of the city's Season of Culture's In House Festival. Further, she appeared at the Zolelet Jazz and World Music Showcase in Tel Aviv 2017. When she was scheduled for the 2021 Arabofolies Festival in France, Palestinian artists Suhad Khatib and Alaa Abu Diab as well as Jumana Manna and Hadeel Alsafadi boycotted the festival.

In their concerts and recordings, Elkayam and Hai Cohen have interpreted songs by Jewish singers from the Maghreb including Albert Swissa, Salim Halali, and Zohra El Fassia, among others. Their version of Zohra Al Fassia's song "Hak Ya Mama" inspired Moroccan singer Fayçal Azizi, who released a popular cover version of this song in Morocco in 2014.

In 2021, she was invited at the Near Eastern and Judaic Studies Program at Brandeis University to speak at the school's Studio Israel program. In 2024, Elkayam and her partner and artistic collaborator Amit Hai Cohen were artists in residence at Xavier University of Louisiana.

=== Films ===
Elkayam appeared in the 2019 Keren Yedaya anti-war film Red Fields and was nominated for her lead role at the Ophir Awards, where she sang in Hebrew. The same year, Elkayam and Hai Cohen participated in the documentary film In your eyes, I see my country, directed by Franco-Moroccan filmmaker Kamal Hashkar. During a trip to Morocco and accompanied by musical encounters, they tried to explore their dual identity, marked by the exile of their parents.

== Discography ==
- Arénas, inspired by Jewish women's voices at the Arénas camp, Marseille, 2026

== Awards and recognitions ==
- Nomination for Ophir Award for her lead role in the musical film Red Fields, 2019.

== Reception ==
Elkayam was named in a 2017 study about the cultural revival of the Moroccan diaspora in Israel as one of the "extremely popular singers [...] performing in Moroccan Arabic". Other well-known singers of Moroccan background named were Raymonde Abecassis, Mike Karoutchi, and Zehava Ben. Commenting on the Moroccan diaspora's cultural production in Israel, the study noted its broad spectrum of artistic forms. According to the study, this expresses a sustained connection to Moroccan identity, contributes to the preservation of cultural identity among Israelis of Moroccan background, and supports the livelihoods of many individuals through commercial cultural activities.
