= Thirst (disambiguation) =

Thirst is a craving for liquids.

Thirst may also refer to:

== Film ==
- Thirst (1929 film) or Desert Nights, an American silent film starring John Gilbert
- Thirst (1949 film), a Swedish film by Ingmar Bergman
- Pyaasa or Thirst, a 1957 Indian film by Guru Dutt
- Thirst (1959 film), a Soviet film
- Thirst (1960 film), an Argentine-Spanish film
- Thirst (1961 film), a Romanian film
- Thirst (1979 film), an Australian film by Rod Hardy
- Thirst, a 1998 American television film directed by Bill L. Norton
- Thirst (2004 film), an Israeli-Palestinian film
- The Thirst (film), a 2006 horror film directed by Jeremy Kasten
- Thirst (2009 film), a Korean film by Park Chan-wook
- Thirst (2010 film), a Canadian film starring Lacey Chabert
- Thirst, an Australian film of 2012
- Thirst (2019 film), an Icelandic film

== Literature ==
- Thirst, a 1913 play by Eugene O'Neill
- The Thirst (novel), a 2017 novel by Jo Nesbø
- Thirst (novel), a 2019 novel by Amelie Nothomb

== Music ==
- The Thirst (band), a British rock band
- Thirst (Clock DVA album), 1981
- Thirst (Randy Stonehill album), 1998
- Thirst (Tankard album), 2008
- Thirst (Slow Crush album), 2025
- "Thirst", a song by City and Colour from The Hurry and the Harm

== Television ==
- "Thirst" (NCIS), an episode
- "Thirst" (Smallville), an episode
- "Thirst" (Transformers: Prime), an episode

== Other uses ==
- The Thirst, in comics, an enemy of Aquaman
- Thirst Project, a nonprofit organization
- A clipping of thirst trap

== See also ==
- Thirsty (disambiguation)
