= Riff Cohen =

Israeli musician and actress

Riff Cohen ריף כהן
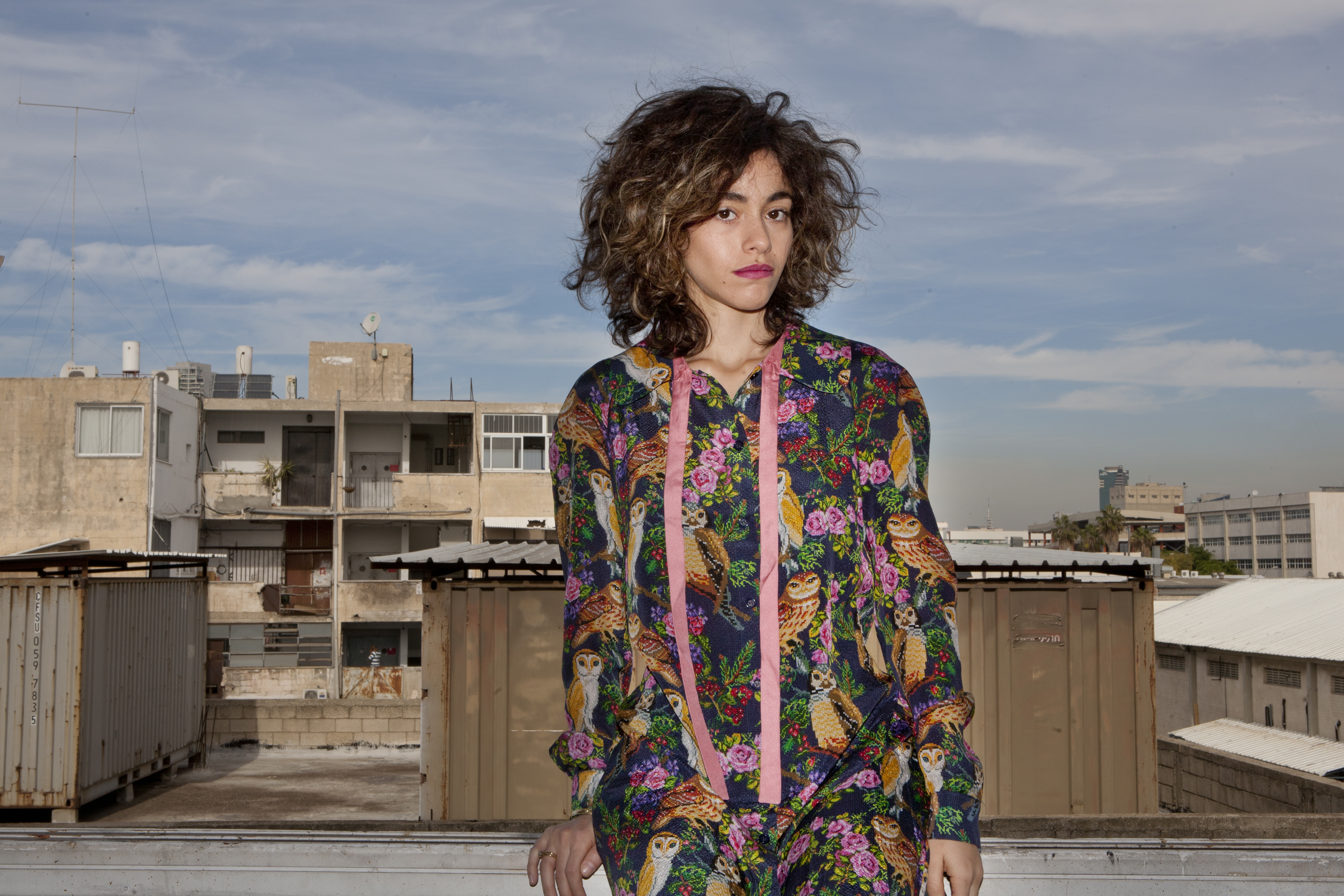

Background information
- Born: March 23, 1984 (age 42); Ramat Aviv, Tel Aviv, Israel
- Genres: Raï, Mizrahi music, rock, Gnawa music
- Occupations: Singer-songwriter, musician, actress
- Years active: 2008–present
- Label: AZ Records
- Website: riffcohenmusic.com/en/clip

Riff Cohen (Hebrew: ריף כהן; born on March 23, 1984) is an Israeli singer-songwriter, actress, and musician who performs songs in Hebrew, French and Arabic.

== Biography ==
Riff Cohen was born in Tel Aviv, Israel, to a Tunisian-Jewish father and an Algerian-French-Jewish mother. She grew up in the Ramat Aviv Gimmel neighborhood. Her father's family is from the Tunisian island of Djerba, and her maternal family is from Tlemcen, Algeria, although her mother was raised in Nice, France. She has two children. After finishing her high school studies she started to focus on her own career; She studied musicology at Tel Aviv University and performed as a singer in a musical ensemble. In 2008 she moved to Paris after winning an artistic scholarship.

== Career ==
In 2012 she released her single "A Paris", whose video on YouTube has received over 4 million visits. The single is part of an album of the same name, which Cohen herself produced and launched later, and includes 14 tracks, four of which are in Hebrew, one in Nubian and the rest in French.

In September 2012, she performed as the opening act for the Red Hot Chili Peppers' I'm with You World Tour in Tel Aviv, Israel. In October of the same year, she signed to AZ Records, a brand of Universal Music. That same year, appeared in the French-Canadian-Israeli film A Bottle in the Gaza Sea, directed by Thierry Binisti and based on a novel by Valérie Zenatti.

In 2013, Cohen received the ACUM Award for "Breakthrough Artist of the Year" award.

In 2014, she collaborated with the psychedelic rock band Moodoïd for its album Le Monde Möö. In 2016, she collaborated with The Borochov Brothers for the Jerusalem Piyyut Festival.

== Music style and influences ==
Cohen defines her music as a mix of Middle Eastern Urban Rock, North-African folk and Raï, considered representative of the Tzarfokai culture, a slang term in Hebrew used to refer to the Francophone Jews from the Maghreb. Her music has been influenced by amazigh music, gnaoua and raï, especially the Algerian singer Cheikha Rabia. Her songs are in Hebrew, French, or Arabic, with her mother Patricia writing the lyrics in French.

== Discography ==
=== Albums ===
- À Paris (2013)
- A La Menthe (2015)
- Quelle Heure Est-ll (2020)
- חור בלב (A Hole in the Heart) (2024)

=== Singles ===
- A Paris (2012)
- Six Heures (2012)
- J'aime (2012)
- Que du bonheur (2014)
- Dans Mon Quartier (2015)
- Hélas (2015)
- Marrakech (2015)
- Tomber De Haut (2019)
- Dis Moi (2019)
- Boi agale lach (2019)
- Quelle heure est-il (prod. Tamir Muskat) (2020)
- Malach (2020)
- Elecha (2020)

== Filmography ==
- Yeladim (2008)
- The Golden Pomegranate (2010) - Miriam the Granddaughter (as Reef Cohen)
- A Bottle in the Gaza Sea (2011) - Efrat
- Vivement dimanche (2012) - Self (Episode: "Enrico Macias 4")
- Bayit. Pizmon. (2018) - Self (Episode 1.4)

== Awards ==
Award	Category	Recipient	Result
2013 Israel Association of Composers, Authors and Publishers of Musical Works Awards	Breakthrough Artist Award		Won
2012 MTV Europe Music Award	Best Israeli Act		Nominated
