= Dana Ivgy =

Israeli actress

- דאנה איבגי
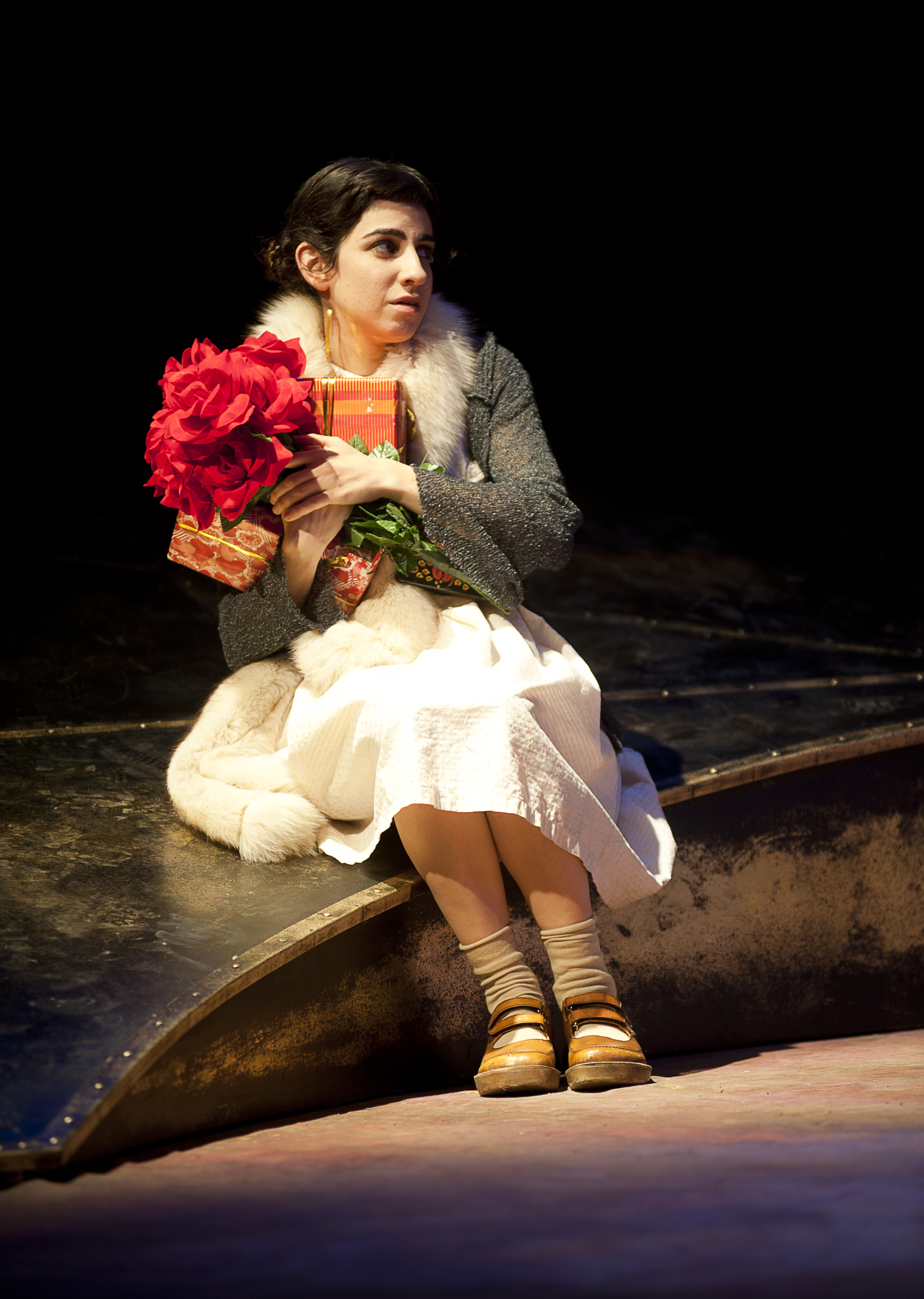
- Princess Ivon, by Witold Gombrowicz, Gesher Theater, 2011
- Born: April 3, 1982 (age 44); Tel Aviv, Israel
- Education: Israeli Film Academy
- Occupation: Actress
- Years active: 1992-
- Parents: Moshe Ivgy (father); Ronit Ivgi (mother)

Dana Ivgy (Hebrew: דאנה איבגי; born April 3, 1982) is an Israeli actress and the daughter of actor Moshe Ivgy.

== Career ==
As a child, Ivgy appeared in several television and film productions. Since graduating from acting school she has appeared in several critically acclaimed films.

In 2002 she garnered the attention of the Israeli Film Academy when she was nominated for the Best Supporting Actress award for her portrayals of Sarit in the sports drama Beitar Provence. She also received the nomination for her role of Tikva Ida in the drama, The Barbecue People based around a picnic celebrating Israeli Independence day. She also appeared in the critically acclaimed film, Broken Wings.

She received considerable acclaim as the protagonist in Keren Yedaya's 2004 picture, Or (My Treasure) a drama about a teenager (Ivgy) and her prostitute mother (played by Ronit Elkabetz). She was awarded prizes by international film festivals and won the Best Actress award by the Israeli Film Academy.

In 2006 she appeared in Aviva, My Love, which won the Israeli Film Academy's award for Best Film. A year later she appeared in Amos Gitai's French-Israeli film, Disengagement about a mother's search for the child she abandoned, amidst the disengagement on the IDF in Gaza.

In 2009 she reunited with Yedaya and Elkabetz for Jaffa, a Romeo & Juliet-inspired drama about an Israeli Jewish girl and an Israeli Arab boy who have conceived a baby and conspire to marry each other, before tragedy interrupts their plans. Her depiction of the pregnant protagonist led to another Best Actress nomination from the Israeli Film Academy. She shared this nomination with her work in Haiu Leilot alongside her father, Moshe Ivgy.

Ivgy has also established Tziporela, a theatre company and is currently writing and directing a short film.

== Filmography ==
| Year | Film | Role | Notes |
|---|---|---|---|
| 1992 | Malachim B'Ruah | Dana | |
| 1993 | Zohar | Girl #1 | |
| 1999 | Zman Avir | Ofra | |
| 2001 | Kochav Zore'ach Me'al HaLev | Dassy | TV |
| 2002 | Beitar Provence | Sarit | Nomination - Ophir Award for Best Supporting Actress |
| 2002 | Broken Wings | Iris | Original title: Knafayim Shvurot |
| 2003 | The Barbecue People | Tikva Ida | Original title: Ha-Mangalistim; Nomination - Ophir Award for Best Supporting Actress |
| 2003 | Tik Sagur | Hila Zaituni | 1 episode: Kartis Sachkan |
| 2004 | Or (My Treasure) | Or | Ophir Award for Best Actress; International Film Festival Bratislava Grand Prix; Mexico City International Contemporary Film Festival Special Distinction Award for Best Actress |
| 2006 | The Substitute | Zohara | Original title: Hayelet Bodeda |
| 2006 | Aviva, My Love | Oshrat Cohen | Original title: Aviva Ahuvati |
| 2006 | Little Heroes | Liron | Original title: Giborim Ktanim |
| 2007 | The Secrets | Sigi | Original title: Ha-Sodot |
| 2007 | Screenz | Gooly | TV series |
| 2007 | The Arbitrator | Oshrit Asulin | 2 episodes |
| 2007 | Disengagement | Dana | Amos Gitai film |
| 2009 | Ruin | Naama | Short film |
| 2009 | Jaffa | Mali Wolf | Nomination - Ophir Award for Best Actress |
| 2010 | Haiu Leilot | Goni | AKA Those Were Nights; Nomination - Ophir Award for Best Actress |
| 2010 | Waiting for the Blackout | Lyla | |
| 2013 | Cupcakes | Dana | |
| 2014 | Next to Her | Gabby | |
| 2014 | Zero Motivation | Zohar | |
| 2018 | Autonomies | Batia | TV miniseries |
| 2021 | Cinema Sabaya | Rona | |
| 2022 | The Other Widow | Ella | Nomination - Ophir Award for Best Actress |
| 2022 | Savoy | Kochava Levi | "Hybrid documentary" and dramatization of the 1975 hostage-taking at Tel Aviv's Savoy Hotel |
| 2025 | The Singer in the Mask | Herself/ Sufganiyah | Season 4 |
| 2025 | Oxygen | Anat | Feature film |
| Fireflies | Dikla | | |

== Personal life ==
Ivgy is married to the artist Itamar Shamshoni. In 2013 their first son was born, and in 2018 their second son was born.

She resides in the Shapira neighborhood in Tel Aviv.
