= Or (My Treasure) =

- Or (my treasure) movie poster
- Directed by: Keren Yedaya
- Written by: Sari Ezouz; Keren Yedaya
- Produced by: Emmanuel Agneray; Jérôme Bleitrach; Marek Rozenbaum; Itai Tamir
- Starring: Dana Ivgy; Ronit Elkabetz
- Cinematography: Laurent Brunet
- Edited by: Sari Ezouz
- Production companies: Bizibi; Transfax Film Productions; Canal+
- Distributed by: Rézo Films (France); Kino International (US)
- Release dates: 16 September 2004 (Israel); 1 December 2004 (France); 15 April 2005 (Sweden); 18 May 2005 (Belgium); 1 June 2005 (United States limited release)
- Running time: 95 min
- Countries: France; Israel
- Language: Hebrew

Or (My Treasure) is a 2004 Israeli-French drama film co-written and directed by Keren Yedaya, starring Dana Ivgy in the title role of Or, a teenager who struggles to be responsible for her prostitute mother Ruthie, played by Ronit Elkabetz. The French-Israeli production premiered on 14 May 2004 at the Cannes Film Festival.

== Plot synopsis ==
A teenager named Or (Dana Ivgy) works a variety of odd jobs to help support herself and her mother. When her mother, Ruthie (Ronit Elkabetz), returns home after a hospital stay, Or tells Ruthie she has found her a job cleaning houses.

However, Ruthie is unmotivated by her new poorly paid job and quickly returns to prostitution.

In the meantime, Or begins a burgeoning romance with her neighbour and childhood friend, Ido. After they sleep together, Ido's mother confronts Ruthie and makes it clear that though she likes Or she does not approve of their relationship.

Her relationship with Ido and his family crumbling, and finding herself unable to make rent and desperate to save her mother from the streets, Or begins to prostitute herself as well, first by offering sexual services to her landlord and finally by joining an escort service.

== Reception ==
Or won 10 awards, including five at the Cannes Film Festival, and was nominated for a further 8. Rotten Tomatoes gave the film a freshness rating of 77%.

=== Awards and nominations ===
Israeli Film Academy

- Best Actress - Dana Ivgy (won)
- Best Art Direction - Avi Fahima (nomination)
- Best Director - Keren Yedaya (nomination)
- Best Film - (nomination)
- Best Screenplay - Keren Yedaya
  Sari Ezouz (nomination)
- Best Supporting Actress - Ronit Elkabetz (nomination)

Bogota Film Festival

- Best Film - Keren Yedaya (nomination)

International Film Festival Bratislava

- Grand Prix - Keren Yedaya
  Ronit Elkabetz
  Dana Ivgy (won)

Cannes Film Festival

- Critics Week Grand Prize - Keren Yedaya (won)
- Golden Camera - Keren Yedaya (won)
- Prix Regards Jeune Award for Best Feature Film - Keren Yedaya (won)
- SACD Screenwriting Award - Keren Yedaya
  Sari Ezouz (won)
- Young Critics Award for Best Feature - Keren Yedaya (won)

European Film Awards

- European Discovery of the Year - Keren Yedaya (nomination)

Jerusalem Film Festival

- Wolgin Award for Best Israeli Feature - Keren Yedaya (nomination)

Mexico City International Contemporary Film Festival

- Best Realisation - Keren Yedaya (won)
- Best Actress - Ronit Elkabetz shared with Dana Ivgy (won)

Palm Springs International Film Festival

- New Voices/New Visions Special Jury Mention - Keren Yedaya (won)

== Cast ==
- Dana Ivgy as Or
- Ronit Elkabetz as Ruthie
- Katia Zinbris as Rachel
- Meshar Cohen as Ido
