= Red Fields =

2019 film

- Film poster
- Directed by: Keren Yedaya
- Starring: Neta Elkayam
- Release date: 31 July 2019 (Jerusalem FF)
- Running time: 90 minutes
- Country: Israel
- Language: Hebrew

Red Fields is a 2019 Israeli drama, musical film directed by Keren Yedaya. It was screened in the Contemporary World Cinema section at the 2019 Toronto International Film Festival.

== Cast ==
- Neta Elkayam as Mamy
- Ami Abu as Nissim
- Riki Gal as Batia
- Yuval Banai as Yaki
