= Passages (2004 film) =

2004 film

- Directed by: Yang Chao
- Written by: Yang Chao
- Produced by: Yang Haijun
- Starring: Geng Le; Chang Jieping
- Cinematography: Zhang Xigui
- Edited by: Xue Fangmin
- Music by: An Wei
- Release date: 14 May 2004 (Cannes)
- Running time: 112 minutes
- Country: China
- Language: Mandarin

Passages (Chinese: 路程; pinyin: Lù chéng; lit. 'journeys') is a 2004 Chinese drama film directed by Yang Chao. It was screened in the Un Certain Regard section at the 2004 Cannes Film Festival where it won the Caméra d'Or Mention Spéciale prize.

== Plot ==
The film follows two wayward characters, Chen Sihan and his girlfriend, Xiaoping. On the verge of entering university, both characters are looking for a way to make their fortune. The two travel to the city of Wuhan from their home in Anhui province, in the hope that they can purchase rare mushrooms to sell back home. When they return home, they discover they have been cheated and return to Wuhan in hopes of getting a refund. Returning unsuccessfully, Chen Sihan and Xiaoping are forced to decide whether to continue their journey or enter a school life.

== Cast ==
- Geng Le
- Chang Jieping
