= 10 on Ten =

- Directed by: Abbas Kiarostami
- Written by: Abbas Kiarostami
- Produced by: Marin Karmitz; Abbas Kiarostami
- Cinematography: Abbas Kiarostami
- Edited by: Abbas Kiarostami
- Release date: 13 May 2004 (France)
- Running time: 88 minutes
- Country: Iran
- Language: Persian

10 on Ten (Persian: ۱۰ روی ده, romanized: 10 roye dah) is a 2004 Iranian documentary film directed by Abbas Kiarostami. It was screened in the Un Certain Regard section at the 2004 Cannes Film Festival.
