= A Bottle in the Gaza Sea =

- Film poster
- Directed by: Thierry Binisti
- Written by: Thierry Binisti, Valérie Zenatti
- Produced by: TS Productions; France 3 Cinéma; EMA Films (Canada); Lama Films (Israel)
- Starring: Agathe Bonitzer; Mahmoud Shalaby; Hiam Abbass
- Cinematography: Laurent Brunet
- Edited by: Jean-Paul Husson
- Music by: Benoît Charest
- Distributed by: Roissy Films
- Release dates: October 8, 2011 (Pusan International Film Festival); February 8, 2012 (France); March 23, 2012 (Canada)
- Running time: 100 minutes
- Countries: France; Canada; Israel
- Languages: Hebrew; Arabic; French
- Budget: €2,000,000 (estimated)

A Bottle in the Gaza Sea (French: Une bouteille à la mer, Canadian French: Une bouteille dans la mer de Gaza) is a 2011 drama directed by Thierry Binisti based on a novel of the same name. The film, an international co-production shot in French, Hebrew and Arabic, is based on the French young adult novel Une bouteille dans la mer de Gaza by Valérie Zenatti, originally published in 2005 and adapted for the screen by Zenatti and Binisti. Zenatti taught Agathe Bonitzer Hebrew in preparation for starring in the film.

The film received multiple awards in 2011 and 2012, including the Chistera Award for Best Film at the Saint-Jean-de-Luz International Festival, and the Audience Award at the La Réunion Film Festival. It also earned accolades such as the Golden Porthole for Best Adaptation at the From Page to Screen Festival, and Best Actor recognition for Abraham Belaga at the Cabourg Film Festival.

== Plot ==
Tal (Agathe Bonitzer) is the 17-year-old daughter of recent French immigrants to Israel who live in Jerusalem. Following a bomb attack on a local café, she throws a bottle into the sea near Gaza with a message asking for an explanation. Naïm (Mahmoud Shalaby), a sensitive but aimless 20-year-old Palestinian living in Gaza, discovers the bottle and tries to answer Tal's question by initiating an email correspondence. Their mutual suspicion soon develops into a tender friendship.

== About the film ==
The film is based on the bestselling book by Valérie Zenatti, a Jewish woman who immigrated to Israel from France at age 13 and returned to France after completing her military service. Similarly to the film, the book explores the bond between Tal, a sixteen-year-old Israeli, and Naim, a twenty-year-old Palestinian. The story unfolds after a bombing in Tal’s neighborhood, where a young woman loses her life just before her wedding. Deeply affected, Tal writes down her feelings and urges her brother, Eyton, to toss the letter, enclosed in a bottle, into the Gaza Sea. Naim, who calls himself "Gazaman," discovers the letter and replies via email, sparking a cross-boundary exchange of thoughts and emotions.

Since filming in Gaza was not possible, the Gaza portions of the film were shot in Jisr az-Zarqa village.

== Cast ==
- Agathe Bonitzer as Tal Levine
- Mahmoud Shalaby as Naïm Al Fardjouki
- Hiam Abbass as Intessar
- Riff Cohen as Efrat
- Abraham Belaga as Eytan Levine
- Jean-Philippe Écoffey as Dan Levine
- Smadi Wolfman as Myriam
- Salim Daw as Ahmed
- Loai Nofi as Hakim
- François Loriquet as Thomas Morin
- Abdallah El Akal as Daoud
