= The Other Widow =

- Theatrical release poster
- Directed by: Maayan Rypp
- Written by: Maayan Rypp; Anat Gafni
- Produced by: Christophe Audeguis; Amir Harel; Ayelet Kait
- Starring: Dana Ivgy; Ania Bukstein
- Cinematography: Moshe Mishali
- Edited by: Yann Dedet; Clémence Diard
- Music by: Adam Weingrod
- Production companies: Lama Films; Cup of Tea; Tobina Film
- Release date: 21 November 2022 (PÖFF)
- Running time: 83 minutes
- Countries: Israel; France
- Language: Hebrew

The Other Widow (Hebrew: הפילגש) is a 2022 Israeli-French drama film directed by Maayan Rypp (in her directorial debut) and written by Rypp & Anat Gafni. Starring Dana Ivgy and Ania Bukstein. It is about a woman whose lover dies and who seeks to reclaim her right to mourn even though her lover's family and wife are still there.

== Synopsis ==
Ella is a theater dressmaker and lover of one of the actors in her play, who dies unexpectedly. In the context of the preparations for the premiere and the increasing pressure from the production, Ella insists on attending Shiva and exposes herself to a world that has been blocked from her until now. Things get complicated when she meets her lover's brother, mother and wife, and gets too close to them.

== Cast ==
- Dana Ivgy as Ella
- Ania Bukstein as Natasha
- Itamar Rotschild as Dan / Assaf
- Yaniv Biton as Yigal
- Lee Gilat as Kiran
- Naama Preis as Maya
- Irit Gidron as Yehudit
- Svetlana Demidov as Marina
- Mouna Hawa as Yasmin
- Howard Rypp as Reuben
- Anat Atzmon as Amalia
- Batel Israel as Catering Waitress
- Yona Rozenkier as Yinon
- Rom Sheratzky as Yotam
- Ben Drori as Delivery Guy

== Release ==
The Other Widow had its world premiere on November 21, 2022, at the 26th Tallinn Black Nights Film Festival, then screened on February 15, 2023, at the 38th Santa Barbara International Film Festival, on March 22 of the same year at the 27th Sofia International Film Festival and on July 15 of the same year at the Jerusalem Film Festival.

== Reception ==
=== Critical reception ===
Wendy Ide from Screen Daily wrote: "This impressive debut from Ma’ayan Rypp is an elegant and empathetic portrait of that most vilified of female characters, The Other Widow, combining satisfyingly textured character details with a suitably theatrical flourish to arresting effect." Jason Delgado from Film Threat wrote: "The Other Widow is not conventional, but that is something I enjoy about it. The master craftsmanship of the cast and crew transports us to a different point of view that you can’t take your eyes off of."

=== Accolades ===
Year	Award / Festival	Category	Recipient	Result	Ref.
2023	Santa Barbara International Film Festival	Best International Feature Film	The Other Widow	Nominated	
2023	Sofia International Film Festival	Special Mention	The Other Widow	Won	
2023	Sarasota Film Festival	Independent Visions Award	The Other Widow	Nominated	
2023	Cyprus Film Days International Festival	Glocal Images Best Film Award	The Other Widow	Nominated	
2023	Jerusalem Film Festival	Haggiag Award for Best Israeli Feature	The Other Widow	Nominated	
2023	Ophir Award	Best Picture	The Other Widow	Nominated	
2023	Ophir Award	Best Director	Maayan Rypp	Nominated	
2023	Ophir Award	Best Actress	Dana Ivgy	Nominated	
2023	Ophir Award	Best Supporting Actress	Ania Bukstein	Nominated	
2023	Ophir Award	Best Cinematography	Moshe Mishali	Nominated	
2023	Ophir Award	Best Music	Adam Weingrod	Nominated	
2023	Ophir Award	Best Art Direction	Ido Dolev	Won	
2023	Ophir Award	Best Costume Design	Maya Lebovitch	Nominated	
2023	Ophir Award	Best Makeup	Ella Tal	Nominated	
