= Cinema Sabaya =

- Theatrical release poster
- Directed by: Orit Fouks Rotem
- Written by: Orit Fouks Rotem
- Produced by: Roi Kurland, Gal Greenspan, Maya Fischer, Orlaine Bodino, Rhian Vialva
- Starring: Dana Ivgi, Amal Murkus, Marlene Bejali, Ruthie Landau, Haula Haj-Divsi, Joanna Said, Yulia Tagil, Asil Farhat, Orit Samuel, Liora Levy.
- Cinematography: Itay Marom
- Edited by: Neta Dvorkis
- Music by: Karni Postel
- Production company: Green Productions
- Release date: 2021
- Country: Israel
- Languages: Hebrew; Arabic; English
- Box office: $69,609

Cinema Sabaya (Hebrew: סינמה סבאיא) is a 2021 Israeli drama film, directed by Orit Fouks Rotem and produced by the Israeli production company, Green Productions. It stars an all-female cast, including Dana Ivgi, Amal Murkus, Marlene Bejali, Ruthie Landau, Haula Haj-Divsi, Joanna Said, Yulia Tagil, Asil Farhat, Orit Samuel and Liora Levy. In 2022 the film was chosen as the official Israeli nominee for the Academy Award for Best International Film at the 95th Academy Awards. This followed its Ophir Award win for Best Feature Film (along with four additional Ophir Awards). Previously to that, it had also won the Best Debut Film Award at the Jerusalem Film Festival. On March 8, 2022, in celebration of International Women's Day, the film was chosen for a special screening at Beit HaNassi, the Israeli President's Residence. In November 2022 it was picked up by Kino Lorber for North American distribution rights.

== Plot ==
A group of Arab and Jewish women attend a video workshop at a community center run by Rona, a filmmaker from Tel Aviv who teaches them to document their lives. As each student shares footage from her home life, the participants discuss their beliefs and preconceptions. The women interact as mothers, daughters, wives, and members of their community. Inspired by writer and director Orit Fouks Rotem's experiences as a teacher, Cinema Sabaya depicts the group's conversations and interactions as they participate in the workshop.

== Cast ==
- Dana Ivgi - director and host of the workshop.
- Liora Levy - a lonely woman, a sailor who lives on a yacht.
- Marlene Bajali - an elderly Arab woman who gives advice to the participants from her life experience.
- Yulia Tagil - a Russian-speaking Israeli who lives with her daughters and with her mother after her divorce.
- Ruthie Landau - a librarian who is in the second chapter of her life after divorcing an abusive husband.
- Orit Samuel - a married woman whose depressive husband is distant from her.
- Amal Murkus - a lawyer and social and political activist who dreamed of becoming a singer.
- Asil Farhat - a young Arab woman who challenges the conservative lifestyle in her environment.
- Joanna Said - mother of six, religious woman who wants to get a driver's license but is afraid of her husband's reaction.

== Production ==
The film was co-produced by Roi Kurland, Gal Greenspan and Maya Fischer from the Israeli production company, Green Productions (Israel). It was co-produced by Neon Rouge (Belgium) and supported by the Israeli Film Fund, Wallonia-Brussels Federation, The Weil-Bloch Foundation, The New Fund for Cinema and Television, Israel Film Council and The Ministry of Culture and Sports, United King Films, The Israel Lottery Council for Culture & Arts, and Other Israel.

== Release ==
Before its debut, in June 2021 the film was picked up by French sales company, Memento International. The film later debuted at the 2021 Jerusalem Film Festival and was then commercially released in Israel by United King (September 2022). In November 2022 it was picked up by Kino Lorber for North American distribution rights.

== Reception ==
On the review aggregator website Rotten Tomatoes, 92% of 12 critics' reviews are positive, with an average rating of 7.20/10. Metacritic, which uses a weighted average, assigned the film a score of 75 out of 100, based on 8 critics, indicating "generally favorable" reviews.

=== Awards and nominations ===
Cinema Sabaya won the Best Debut Film Award at the Jerusalem Festival and five Ophir Awards: Ophir Award for Best Feature Film, Ophir Award for Best Director to Orit Fouks Rotem, Ophir Award for Best Supporting Actress awarded to Joanna Said, Ophir Award for Best Costume Design awarded to Rachel Ben Dahan, Ophir Award for Best Casting awarded to Emanuel Meyer. The film won the Weil Bloch Award for 2021. The award was presented by Gal Gadot. The film was nominated to represent Israel in the category of best foreign film at the Oscars.

=== Accolades ===
| Awards | Date of ceremony | Category | Recipient(s) | Result | Ref |
|---|---|---|---|---|---|
| Jerusalem Film Festival | 2021 | Best Debut Film Award | Orit Fouks Rotem and Green Productions | Won | |
| Weil Bloch Award | 2021 | Best Film | Cinema Sabaya | Won | |
| Warsaw IFF | 2021 | Jury Special Mention & NETPAC Award | Cinema Sabaya | Won | |
| FICER | 2021 | Audience Award | Cinema Sabaya | Won | |
| Ophir Awards | September 18, 2022 | Best Film | Green Productions | Won | |
| Ophir Awards | September 18, 2022 | Best Director | Orit Fouks Rotem | Won | |
| Ophir Awards | September 18, 2022 | Best Supporting Actress | Joanne Said | Won | |
| Ophir Awards | September 18, 2022 | Best Costume Design | Rachel Ben Dahan | Won | |
| Ophir Awards | September 18, 2022 | Best Casting | Emmanuelle Mayer | Won | |
| Ophir Awards | September 18, 2022 | Best Actress | Dana Ivgi | Nominated | |
| Ophir Awards | September 18, 2022 | Best edit | Neta Dvorkis | Nominated | |
| Ophir Awards | September 18, 2022 | Best Screenwriter | Orit Fouks Rotem | Nominated | |
| Ophir Awards | September 18, 2022 | Best original music | Karni Postel | Nominated | |
| Ophir Awards | September 18, 2022 | Best soundtrack | Shahaf Wagshall | Nominated | |
| Ophir Awards | September 18, 2022 | Best Director of photography | Itay Marom | Nominated | |
| Ophir Awards | September 18, 2022 | Best Makeup Artist | Orly Ronen | Nominated | |
| Toronto Jewish Film Festival | 2022 | Micki Moore Award | Cinema Sabaya | Won | |
| Warsaw Jewish Film Festival | 2022 | Camera Of David for the Best Feature Film | Cinema Sabaya | Won | |
| Nice Israël Film Festival | 2022 | Mimosa d'or Award for best film | Cinema Sabaya | Won | |
