= Jaffa (2009 film) =

2009 film

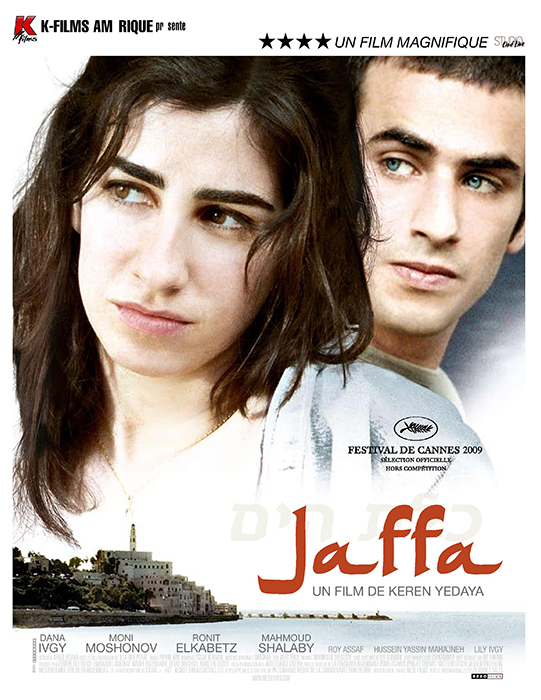
- Theatrical release poster
- כלת הים
- Directed by: Keren Yedaya
- Written by: Keren Yedaya; Illa Ben Porat
- Starring: Dana Ivgy; Moni Moshonov; Ronit Elkabetz; Mahmud Shalaby
- Cinematography: Pierre Aïm
- Edited by: Asaf Korman
- Release date: 10 June 2009
- Running time: 106 minutes
- Country: Israel
- Language: Hebrew

Jaffa (alternative name in Hebrew כלת הים transliteration Kalat Hayam, in Arabic عروس البحر transliteration "Arous el Bahr" both Hebrew and Arabic meaning "the bride of the sea") is a 2009 Israeli film directed by Keren Yedaya. A joint Israeli, French and German production, it was given a special screening at the 2009 Cannes Film Festival.

== Plot ==
Jaffa is a mixed Palestinian–Jewish seaside city near Tel Aviv, where Reuven Wolf (Moni Moshonov) has a garage for repairing cars. His wife Ossi (Ronit Elkabetz), a vain, self-centered woman, just makes everybody's life difficult.

The couple's daughter, Mali Wolf (Dana Ivgy), has secretly fallen in love with her childhood friend, the young Toufik (newcomer Mahmud Shalaby), a hard-working youth who has come as a helping hand to his Israeli-Palestinian father Hassan, a long-time mechanic working for Reuven. Meanwhile, Reuven's son and Mali's brother Meir (Roy Assaf) resents working in the garage and further resents the presence of Palestinian Toufik, and bullies him around.

In a most tragic night, everybody's life is changed. Meir and his mother have a grave argument and she throws him out. Next morning, a crisis erupts between Meir and Toufik with the latter fatally injuring Meir in an unfortunate accident. This cancels the plan the already pregnant Mali and her lover Toufik had made to elope. Although she decides to have an abortion so as not to have a baby from her brother's killer, she eventually decides to keep the baby, concealing that Toufik is the father of the child, and the devastated Wolf family moves to Ramat Gan.

The story picks up after 9 years, when Toufik is released from jail and Mali Wolf is torn between allegiance to her family who has helped her raise the illegitimate child Shiran (Lili Ivgy) and her lover Toufik.

== Cast ==
- Dana Ivgy as Mali Wolf
- Moni Moshonov as Reuven Wolf
- Ronit Elkabetz as Osnat 'Ossi' Wolf
- Mahmud Shalaby as Toufik
- Hussein Yassin Mahajne as Hassan
- Roy Assaf as Meir Wolf
- Dalia Beger as Aunt Suzi
- Lili Ivgy as Shiran Wolf
- Zenabh Mahrab as Naima
- Suma Zenabh as Evtesam
