= Hold Back =

- Film poster
- French: Rengaine
- Directed by: Rachid Djaidani
- Written by: Rachid Djaidani
- Produced by: Rachid Djaidani; Anne-Dominique Toussaint
- Starring: Slimane Dazi; Sabrina Hamida; Stéphane Soo Mongo
- Cinematography: Rachid Djaidani; Julien Boeuf; Karim El Dib; Elamine Oumara
- Edited by: Rachid Djaidani; Julien Boeuf; Karim El Dib; Svetlana Vaynblat
- Music by: Steve Argüelles
- Production company: Or Productions
- Distributed by: Haut et Court
- Release dates: 15 May 2012 (Cannes); 14 November 2012 (France)
- Running time: 78 minutes
- Country: France
- Language: French
- Budget: $800,000
- Box office: $237,000

Hold Back (French: Rengaine) is a 2012 French drama film directed and written by Rachid Djaidani.

== Plot ==
In Paris, Dorcy, a young Black Christian and Sabrina, a young North African, want to marry. Their project, however, faces an entrenched taboo in the minds of both communities : no marriage between blacks and Arabs. Slimane, big brother, guardian of traditions, will oppose by all means to this union.

== Cast ==
- Slimane Dazi as Slimane
- Sabrina Hamida as Sabrina
- Stéphane Soo Mongo as Dorcy
- Nina Morato as Nina
- Max Boublil as Dorcy's friend

== Accolades ==
Award	Category	Recipient	Result
Cannes Film Festival	Directors' Fortnight	Rachid Djaidani	Won
Cannes Film Festival	Caméra d'Or	Rachid Djaidani	Nominated
Cork Film Festival	Audience Award	Rachid Djaidani	Nominated
César Award	Best First Feature Film	Rachid Djaidani & Anne-Dominique Toussaint	Nominated
Deauville Film Festival	Michel d'Ornano Award	Rachid Djaidani	Won
Lumière Awards	Most Promising Actor	Stéphane Soo Mongo	Nominated
