= Thirsty (disambiguation) =

To be thirsty is to experience thirst, a craving for potable fluids.

Thirsty may also refer to:

- Thirsty (novel), a 1997 horror novel by Matthew T. Anderson
- Pyaasa, or Thirsty, a 1957 Indian film by Guru Dutt
- Thirsty (Marvin Sapp album), 2007
- Thirsty (The Black Skirts album), 2019
- "Thirsty" (Mariah Carey song), 2014
- "Thirsty" (Aespa song), 2023
- "Thirsty", a 2015 song by AJR from Living Room
- "Thirsty", a 1960s song by the Camelots
- "Thirsty", a 2015 song by Daya from Daya
- "Thirsty", a 2014 song by PartyNextDoor from PartyNextDoor Two
- "Thirsty", a 2017 song by Taemin from Move
- "Thirsty", a 2024 song by Tinashe from Quantum Baby

== See also ==
- Thirst (disambiguation)
