= Asaf Epstein =

Israeli film director, screenwriter and producer

- אסף אפשטיין
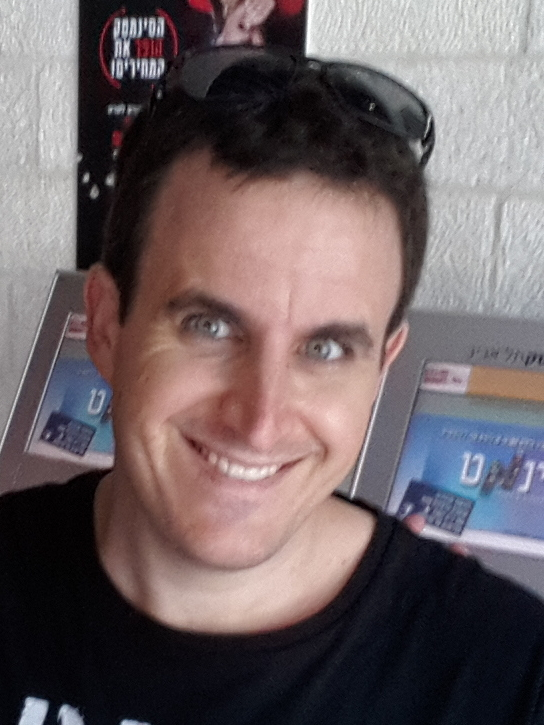
- Asaf Epstein, 2015
- Born: August 1, 1978 (age 47)
- Occupation: Film director
- Years active: 2008-present
- Notable work: Schnitzel
- Website: asafepstein.com

Asaf Epstein (Hebrew: אסף אפשטיין; born August 1, 1978) is an Israeli film director, writer and producer.

== Biography ==
Asaf Epstein was born in Israel on August 1, 1978, to Lea and Hanan Epstein. He is the older brother of Roni and Effie Epstein. When he was a young boy, the family relocated to Fort Worth, Texas, where Epstein attended a private Jewish school. The family then relocated back to the town of Modiin in Israel. There, he attended junior high school. In 1995, the family relocated back to the United States and settled in Dallas, Texas, where Epstein attended J. J. Pearce High School in Richardson.

During his early twenties, Epstein left his family in the United States and relocated back to Israel on his own to enlist in the Israel Defense Forces, where he took on a desk job in the Air Force. In the early 2000s, Epstein enrolled to study film at Tel Aviv University.

== Career ==
After graduating from university, Epstein produced independent corporate promotional clips making use of various animated elements. In 2008, he took part in the production of two Israeli films; The Other War, a drama set in Tel-Aviv during the second Lebanon war, and Jaffawiye, a documentary about the multicultural hip-hop band System Ali. In 2010, Epstein produced Mother's Fading, a short film drama about the complex relationship between a mother and her son.

In 2011, he began production on his award-winning sci-fi, thriller comedy short entitled Schnitzel, which he wrote, produced and directed. Schnitzel tells the tale of a young teenage boy and his encounter with an extra terrestrial being which has taken the form of a schnitzel. In a 2016 interview, Epstein remarked that Schnitzel was inspired by Steven Spielberg's E.T., and his experience of being an "awkward and goofy kid being uncomfortable in his own skin" and a school field trip during which he and his classmates were given schnitzels for lunch. In July 2014, he released Schnitzel which earned him numerous awards at festivals around the world including Best International Film at the South Carolina Cultural Film Festival, Best Science Fiction Film at the Hyart Film Festival and Best International Coming-of-Age at the Manhattan Film Festival in 2015. Later that year, he would go on to win Best Producer of a Foreign Language Film at the Madrid International Film Festival.

== Filmography ==
Year	Title	Notes
2008	The Other War	gaffer
2008	Jaffawiye	camera operator
2010	Mother's Fading	producer
2014	Schnitzel	director, writer, producer
