= That Lovely Girl =

2014 Israeli-French film

- Film poster
- Directed by: Keren Yedaya
- Written by: Shez, Keren Yedaya
- Produced by: Emmanuel Agneray
- Cinematography: Laurent Brunet
- Edited by: Arik Lahav-Leibovich
- Release dates: 15 May 2014 (Cannes); 21 August 2014 (Israel)
- Running time: 95 minutes
- Countries: Israel; France
- Language: Hebrew

That Lovely Girl (French: Loin de mon père (lit. Far from my father), Hebrew: הרחק מהיעדרו) is a 2014 Israeli-French drama film directed by Keren Yedaya, starring Meyen Turgeman, Tzahi Grad, and Yael Abecasis in the lead roles. It was selected to compete in the Un Certain Regard section at the 2014 Cannes Film Festival.

The film is an adaptation of the novel Away From His Absence by Shez. The story follows Tami, who is in a toxic incestuous relationship with her father Moshe, which she is unable to break free from.

The film has no original music soundtrack. It contains difficult-to-watch scenes of sexual intercourse between a father and daughter and a group rape.

== Plot ==
Tami (played by Meayan Torgeman), a woman in her early twenties, lives in an apartment with her father Moshe (Tzahi Grad), who is around 60. The film begins by describing their daily routine. Tami brushes her teeth, applies nail polish, cleans the apartment, and prepares food for her father. The routine initially seems normal, but soon a harsh and sick truth is revealed. Moshe has sexual relations with his daughter. He rapes her, beats her, and abuses her physically, verbally, and sexually.

Tami endures sexual abuse from her father, experiences a traumatic encounter with strangers at the beach, and briefly finds refuge with a woman named Shuli. Despite the abuse, she returns to her father after he claims to have ended his relationship with his mistress. When he becomes excited about her potential pregnancy and plans to move to Los Angeles, Tami finally realizes the severity of her situation, escapes to Shuli, and ultimately undergoes an abortion.

== Cast ==
- Maayan Turjeman as Tami
- Tzahi Grad as Moshe
- Yaël Abecassis as Shuli
- Tal Ben-Bina as Iris

== Reception ==
The Hollywood Reporter described the film as "oddly flat", but praised the cast, "who give rich, sustained performances".
