= EMI Hemisphere =

British record label

- Parent company: Parlophone Label Group
- Founded: 1993
- Founder: Carl Lindström
- Distributor(s): EMI Records (UK)
- Genre: World
- Location: United Kingdom

EMI Hemisphere is a world music record label imprint of EMI.

Founded by Gerald Seligman in 1993, it drew on music from the international catalogues of EMI Records, supplemented by its own signings and some outside licensing. It was one of the first, international labels to extensively compile music of the world. Seligman ran it until 2000 out of London, UK. From there it lasted a few more releases and has since ceased activity. Seligman produced or executive-produced seventy six releases for the label, and is now General Director of WOMEX, the world music expo, based in Berlin.

Circa 2000 it initiated the best-selling The Story of Series, including titles focusing on tango, fado, flamenco, bossa nova, Arab, French, Cuban and Greek popular song performances. Aside from anthologies, it has re-issued performances by individual artists. The label is currently owned by the Parlophone Label Group.

== See also ==
- World music
- Lists of record labels
- WOMEX
