= Marja Mikkonen =

Finnish artist and filmmaker (born 1979)

Marja Viitahuhta (née Mikkonen) (born 1979) is a Finnish artist and filmmaker.

== Life and Career ==
In 2003, she graduated in performance art from the Turku Arts Academy. In 2007, she obtained Master of Fine Arts diploma from the Finnish Academy of Fine Arts. Her short films have been presented at major international festivals around the world and have won various prizes, including 2nd prize Cinéfondation at the 2004 Cannes Film Festival for 99 VUOTTA ELÄMÄSTÄNI (99 Years of My Life).

Mikkonen lives and works in Helsinki, Finland.

== Selected works ==
- 99 VUOTTA ELÄMÄSTÄNI (99 Years of My Life), 2003 short film.
- Rondo, 2007 short film.
