= Next to Her =

2015 film

- Film poster
- את לי לילה
- Directed by: Asaf Korman
- Written by: Liron Ben-Shlush; Script consultant: Sari Ezouz
- Produced by: Haim Mecklberg; Estee Yacov-Mecklberg
- Starring: Dana Ivgy
- Cinematography: Amir Yasur
- Edited by: Shira Hochman; Asaf Korman
- Production company: 2-Team Productions
- Distributed by: United King Films
- Release dates: 22 May 2014 (Cannes); 8 January 2015
- Running time: 89 minutes
- Country: Israel
- Language: Hebrew
- Budget: €500,000

Next to Her (Hebrew: את לי לילה; At Li Layla) is a 2014 Israeli drama film directed by Asaf Korman and written by Liron Ben-Shlush. It was selected to be screened as part of the Directors' Fortnight section of the 2014 Cannes Film Festival.

== Plot ==
The story takes place in Haifa and centers around two sisters. The younger sister, Gabi (Dana Ivgy), has a developmental intellectual disability, and the older sister, Heli (Liron Ben-Shlush), dedicates her life to caring for her. However, she is eventually forced to stop caring for Gabi, and the balance in her life is disrupted. Throughout the film, Heli tries to balance the immense responsibility of caring for her sister with a romance that develops with a gym teacher at the school where she works.

== Reception ==
The film received mostly positive reviews, although it was considered difficult to watch. Ivgy's performance was highly praised, earning her the Ophir Award for Best Supporting Actress. The film also won the Haifa Culture Foundation Award for Best Israeli Narrative Feature at the Haifa International Film Festival.

== Cast ==
- Dana Ivgy as Gabby
- Liron Ben-Shlush as Chelli
- Yaakov Zada Daniel as Zohar
- Liat Goren as Shifra
- Varda Ben Hur as Shosh
- Carmit Messilati-Kaplan as Jenny
- Sophia Ostrisky as Sveta
