= Thirst (2004 film) =

- Directed by: Tawfik Abu Wael
- Starring: Hussein Yassin Mahajne; Amal Bweerat
- Release date: 13 May 2004 (CFF)
- Running time: 1h 49min

Thirst (Arabic: Atash) is a 2004 Israeli-Palestinian drama film directed by Tawfik Abu Wael.

== Cast ==
- Hussein Yassin Mahajne as Abu Shukri
- Amal Bweerat as Um Shukri
- Ruba Blal as Jamila
- Jamila Abu Hussein as Halima

== Awards ==
- FIPRESCI (Cannes Critics Week 2004)
