= Schnitzel (film) =

Schnitzel the Movie
- Schnitzel Movie Poster
- שניצל
- Directed by: Asaf Epstein
- Written by: Asaf Epstein
- Produced by: Asaf Epstein; Adi Feldman
- Starring: Neveh Tzur; Olga Bardukov; Arik Mishali; Nir Malik; Adi Feldman
- Cinematography: Edan Sasson
- Edited by: Tal Keller
- Music by: Amit Poznansky
- Release date: July 22, 2014 (Israel)
- Running time: 22 minutes
- Country: Israel
- Language: Hebrew

Schnitzel (Hebrew: שניצל) is a short, sci-fi, and comedy Israeli film which was written, produced and directed by Asaf Epstein and stars Neveh Tzur, Olga Bardukov, Arik Mishali, Nir Malik and Adi Feldman.

== Plot ==
=== Synopsis ===
An extraterrestrial visitor from outer space lands in a supermarket and decides to take the form of a schnitzel. Kobi Zucker (Neveh Tzur), a young teenage boy, is challenged by his love interest, Maya Kaplinski (Olga Bardukov), to retrieve something for her from within the supermarket. Craziness ensues when Kobi enters the supermarket and is confronted with "Schnitzel" the alien.

=== Characters ===
- Kobi Zucker (Neveh Tzur)
- Maya Kaplinski (Olga Bardukov)
- Simon the Butcher (Arik Mishali)
- Shraga the Guard (Nir Malik)
- Cashier Lady (Adi Feldman)
- Rollerblader (Ori Zeira)
- Grandmother (Ana Lebovitz)
- Strutting Screamer (Zarina Canizo)
- Benny (Navon Dassa)
- Bevermann (Yuval Malka)
- Kobi's Mother (voice) (Marina Kagan)
- Radio Announcer (Oded Leopold)
- Cheese Stewardess (Shira Refael)
- CGI - Actor / Singing Worker (Adam Dunhoff)
- Schnitzel (voice) (Yael Shachar)

== Production ==
Schnitzel was produced in Israel across 4 major locations. Interior shots of the supermarket were filmed in Hatzor HaGlilit while exterior shots were shot at Mishmar HaSharon. Other scenes such as that of the country road were shot in Ga'ash. Studio production was rendered in Tel-Aviv.

Original score was written and produced for the film by Amit Poznansky.

The film also made use of CGI to create the character of "Schnitzel" the alien which was then blended in with live-action scenes.

== Awards ==
- Best Score (Amit Poznansky) - South Carolina Cultural Film Festival (2015)
- Best International Film - South Carolina Cultural Film Festival (2015)
- Best Science Fiction Film - Hyart Film Festival (2015)
- Best International Coming-of-Age - Manhattan Film Festival (2015)
- Best Producer of a Foreign Language Film - Madrid International Film Festival (2015)
