= Valérie Zenatti =

French author, translator, and scriptwriter (born 1970)

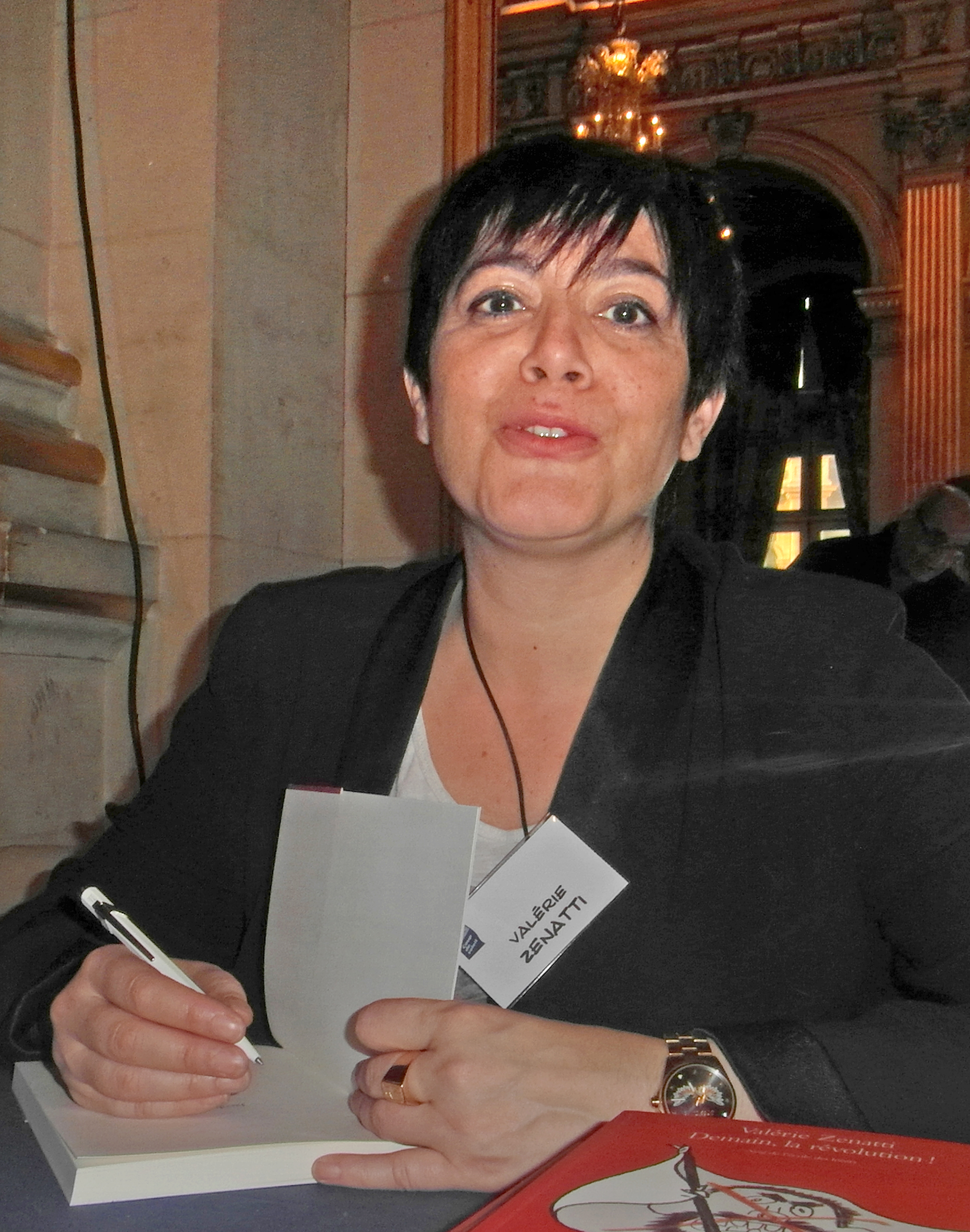
- Valérie Zenatti in 2015
- Born: April 1, 1970 (age 56); Nice, France
- Occupations: Writer, translator, screenwriter
- Notable work: Jacob, Jacob (2014)
- Awards: Prix du Livre Inter (2015); Prix Méditerranée (2015)

Valérie Zenatti (born 1 April 1970, in Nice) is a French writer, translator and screenwriter.

== Biography ==
Her novel, Jacob, Jacob enjoyed a critical and public success and - after being selected in the final prix Médicis and prix des libraires – was awarded the prix du Livre Inter in June 2015. and seven other prizes including the Prix Méditerranée, le Prix Libraires en Seine et le prix Azur.

She's also the translator of Aharon Appelfeld into French.

== Work ==
=== Children/young adult books ===
- 1999: Une addition, des complications, École des loisirs, coll. Neuf
- 1999: Une montre pour grandir, illustrations Frédéric Richard, École des loisirs, coll. Mouche
- 2000: Koloïshmielnik s’en va-t-en guerre, École des loisirs, coll. Neuf
- 2001: Fais pas le clown, Papa !, illustrations by Kimiko, École des loisirs, coll. Mouche
- 2002: Le Secret de Micha, illustrations Alan Metz, École des loisirs, coll. Mouche
- 2002: Quand j'étais soldate, École des loisirs, coll. Médium – Prix ado-lisant 2004
- 2004: Jonas, poulet libre, illustrations de Nadja, École des loisirs, coll. Mouche
- 2004: Demain, la révolution !, École des loisirs, coll. Neuf
- 2005: Une bouteille dans la mer de Gaza, École des loisirs, coll. Médium
- 2007: Boubélé, illustrations Audrey Poussier, École des loisirs, coll. Mouche
- 2007: Adieu, mes 9 ans !, École des loisirs, coll. Neuf
- 2008: « Une balle perdue », nouvelle dans le recueil collectif Il va y avoir du sport mais moi je reste tranquille, École des loisirs
- 2009: Vérité, vérité chérie, illustrations Audrey Poussier, École des loisirs, coll. Mouche
- 2010: Le Blues de Kippour with Serge Lask, éd. Naïve

=== Novels ===
- 2006 : En retard pour la guerre, éditions de l'Olivier; Points Seuil sous le titre Ultimatum.
- 2010: Les Âmes sœurs, éditions de l'Olivier; Points Seuil, 2011
- 2011: Mensonges, éd. de l'Olivier
- 2012: Mariage blanc, éd. du Moteur
- 2014: Jacob, Jacob, éd. de l'Olivier; Points Seuil, 2016 – Prix Méditerranée 2015 et Prix du Livre Inter

=== Translations ===
From Hebrew to French

- 2004: Histoire d'une vie by Aharon Appelfeld
- 2006: L'Amour, soudain by Aharon Appelfeld
- 2007: Double Jeu by Yair Lapid
- 2008: Floraison sauvage by Aharon Appelfeld
- 2008: Sur le vif by Michal Govrin
- 2008: La Chambre de Mariana by Aharon Appelfeld
- 2009: Un petit garçon idéal by Zeruya Shalev
- 2009: Et la fureur ne s'est pas encore tue by Aharon Appelfeld
- 2011: Le Garçon qui voulait dormir by Aharon Appelfeld
- 2012: Yolanda by Moshé Sakal
- 2013: Les Eaux tumultueuses by Aharon Appelfeld
- 2014: Adam et Thomas by Aharon Appelfeld
- 2015: Les partisans by Aharon Appelfeld

=== Screenwriter ===
- 2021: Valiant Hearts, directed by Mona Achache
