= Keren Yedaya =

Israeli filmmaker (born 1972)

- קרן ידעיה
- Born: 1972 (age 53–54); United States
- Occupations: Film director, screenwriter

Keren Yedaya (Hebrew: קרן ידעיה; born in 1972) is an Israeli filmmaker. She was born in the United States, but her family moved to Israel in 1975. She attended Tichon Hadash high school in Tel Aviv. She trained at the Camera Obscura School of Art in Tel Aviv.

== Biography ==
Yedaya is known as a political activist for feminism and women's rights and takes part in protests against Israeli military presence in the West Bank. Her films are reflections of her political activism. She started her career making short films, including Elinor (1994), about the tribulations of an Israeli female conscript to the Army, and Lulu (1998) focusing on prostitution in Israel. Based on these works, French producer Emmanuel Agneray invited her to France where she shot her third short film Les dessous (English title: Underwear), about a Parisian lingerie and women's wear store.

In 2001, she received from the Montpelier Mediterranean Film Festival financial support for developing a long feature film. The result was her first long feature Or (My Treasure) in 2004 and it won the Caméra d'Or at the Cannes Film Festival. Her follow-up features is Jaffa in 2009, also screened at the Cannes Film Festival.

Her 2014 film That Lovely Girl was selected to compete in the Un Certain Regard section at the 2014 Cannes Film Festival.

== Filmography ==
=== Director ===
- 1994: Elinor (short film)
- 1999: Lulu (short film)
- 2001: Les dessous (aka Underwear)
- 2004: Or (My Treasure)
- 2009: Jaffa
- 2014: That Lovely Girl
- 2019: Red Fields

=== Writer ===
- 2001: Les dessous
- 2004: Or (My Treasure)
- 2009: Jaffa

== Awards ==
- 2004: Won the "Caméra d'Or" at the Cannes Film Festival for her film Or (My Treasure)
