= Aloïse Sauvage =

French multidisciplinary artist (born 1992)

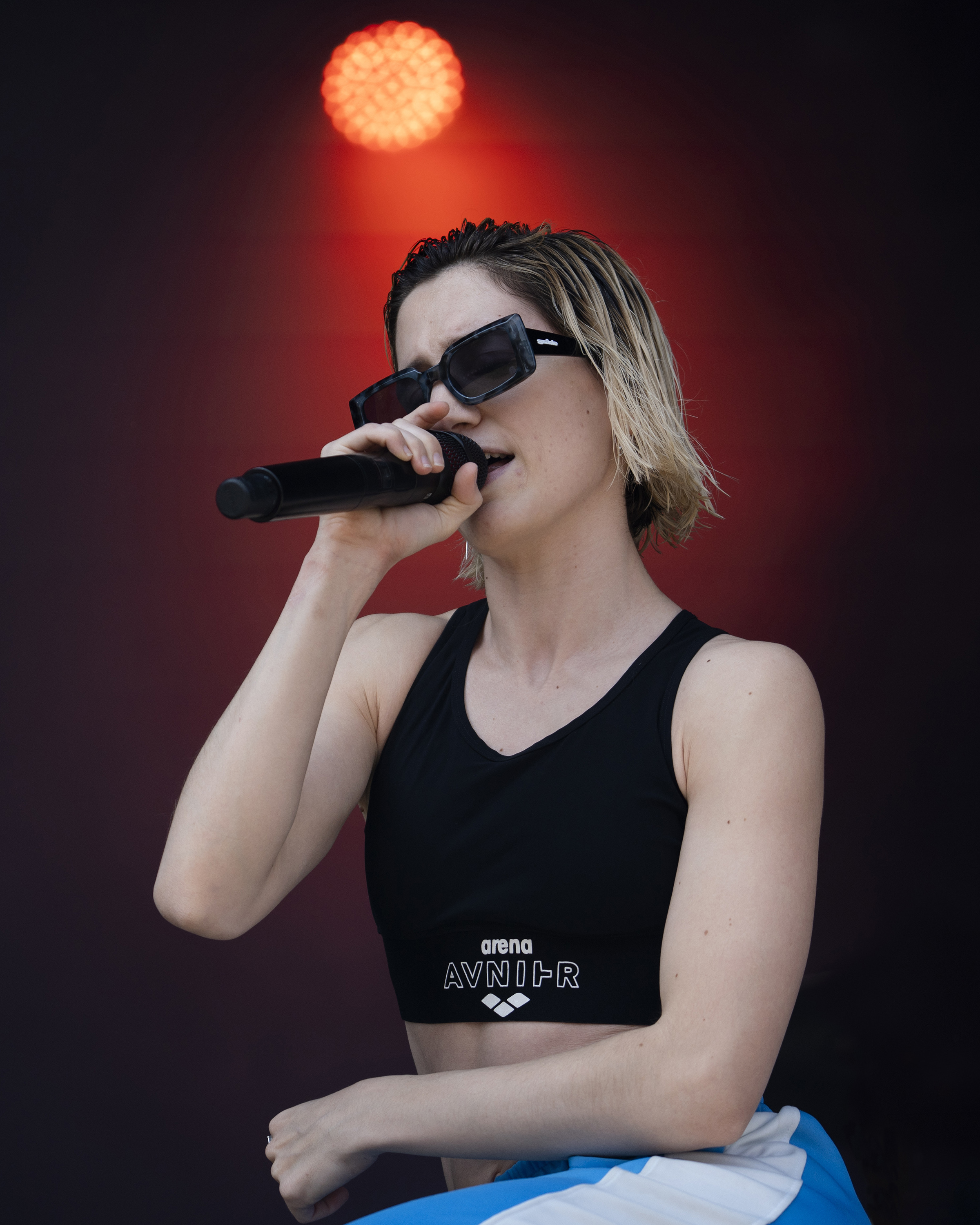
- In 2023
- Born: September 25, 1992 (age 33); Le Mée-sur-Seine, Seine-et-Marne, France
- Education: Académie Fratellini
- Occupations: rapper, dancer, circus performer, actor, lyricist, singer
- Years active: Since 2017

Aloïse Sauvage, born on September 25, 1992 in Le Mée-sur-Seine, is a French multidisciplinary artist active in music, cinema, contemporary circus, and dance. Noticed as an actress in the 2017 film 120 battements par minute, she launched her music career in 2018 with original videos that achieved online success. She was nominated for the Victoire de la Musique in 2020 in the "Révélation scène" category. She released her first studio album, Dévorantes, in February 2020, followed by Sauvage in October 2022.

She was nominated for the Revelations list of the Académie des Arts et Techniques du Cinéma for the 50th César Awards in 2025.

== Biography ==
=== Childhood ===
Aloïse Sauvage, born in September 1992 in Le Mée-sur-Seine, Seine-et-Marne, grew up there. Her mother is a school principal and her father is a documentalist. Aloïse Sauvage has two siblings. She joined the conservatory of Le Mée-sur-Seine where she learned transverse flute, drums, and saxophone.

In parallel, she practiced breakdance and wrote her first texts, including slam poetry.

After graduating from high school, she joined the Regional Center for Circus Arts in Lomme to train and prepare for auditions at higher contemporary circus schools. The following year, she auditioned for the Académie Fratellini and was accepted. She spent three years studying there, specializing in "acro-dance." During her studies, she met the director and choreographer Raphaëlle Boitel, with whom she later worked and who introduced her to the person who would become her agent.

=== Beginnings ===
She first appeared in a feature film in 2015 when Nicole Garcia chose her to play the role of Agostine in her film Mal de pierres, alongside Marion Cotillard and Louis Garrel.

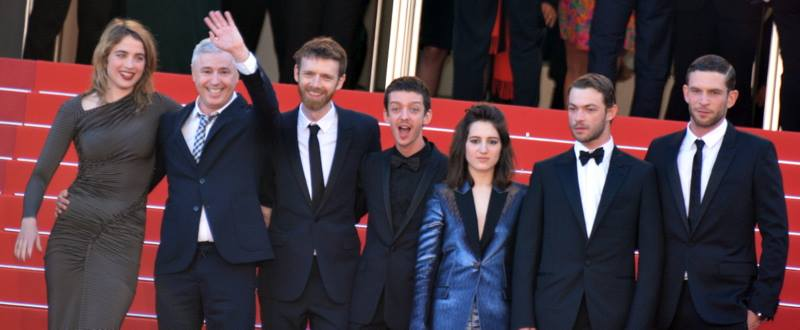
Aloïse Sauvage (5th from the left) during the red-carpet event of the 2017 Cannes Film Festival for the film crew of 120 battements par minute

In 2016, she joined the cast of the film 120 battements par minute. She played Eva, a young woman tasked with maintaining order in the meetings of the Act Up-Paris association. The film was selected at the 2017 Cannes Film Festival. That same year, she was part of the Cannes Adami Talents program.

Between September 2017 and March 2018, Sauvage released several songs: Ailleurs Higher, Aphone, and Hiver brûlant. She performed as the opening act for Eddy de Pretto. Between September and November 2018, she participated in the filming of Olivier Nakache and Éric Toledano's movie Hors normes. Sauvage began writing songs (and recording them) with music producers Josh Rosinet and Le Motif. In November 2018, she performed at the Trans Musicales festival, where her performance was noticed. During this concert, she set up a microphone suspended by a wire.

In January 2019, the film Les Fauves by Vincent Mariette was released, in which she played Anne, Laura's cousin (played by Lily-Rose Depp). Filming took place in the Dordogne for three months in 2018.

In May 2019, she released her first EP, Jimy.

During the summer of 2019, she participated in filming the Israeli series Possessions for Canal+.

In 2020, she was nominated in the révélation scène category at the 35th Victoires de la Musique ceremony. During the event, she performed her song À l'horizontale. On February 28, 2020, she released her first studio album, Dévorantes, and simultaneously released the music video for her single Omowi.

In 2022, she released her second studio album, Sauvage, and embarked on a tour across France and French-speaking countries. She sold out the Cigale and Olympia venues that same year.

In 2023, she starred in the film Sur un fil, directed by Reda Kateb. It was her first leading role.

=== Artistic style ===
Aloïse Sauvage's music is primarily rooted in rap. She cites Diam's and Stromae as influences. Through the lyrics of her songs, Aloïse Sauvage explores themes such as love, lesbianism (as in Jimy), homophobia (in Omowi, a play on words for "Homo, yes!"), freedom, and emancipation. She also addresses the absence of a father in Papa, cancer in Tumeur, and depression in Et cette tristesse. Regarding her style, Éric Bureau from Le Parisien identifies in Aloïse Sauvage "the confidence, delivery, and memorable choruses of Diam's, the poetry and freedom of Christine and the Queens, the afro-trap of rapper MHD, the auto-tuned voice of PNL, and Stromae's ability to make pain dance..." She also frequently discusses sexism and the expectations it imposes, particularly physical appearance, clothing, and gender stereotypes forced on women. She also addresses the MeToo movement and its implications, sexual violence, and resistance. Aloïse Sauvage identifies as a feminist artist, advocating for deconstruction in line with the queer and LGBTQIAP+ movements to transcend gender norms.

=== Private life ===
Aloïse Sauvage is an open, activist lesbian, which is reflected in her art.

== Filmography ==
=== Cinema ===
==== Feature films ====
- 2016: Mal de pierres by Nicole Garcia: Agostine
- 2017: 120 battements par minute by Robin Campillo: Eva
- 2017: Django by Étienne Comar: woman in resistance movement
- 2018: Cold War by Paweł Pawlikowski: the waitress
- 2018: Les Fauves by Vincent Mariette: Anne
- 2019: Hors normes by Olivier Nakache and Éric Toledano: Shirel
- 2019: Je ne sais pas si c'est tout le monde by Vincent Delerm: herself
- 2021: Placés by Nessim Chikhaoui: Cécile
- 2022: Tout fout le camp de Sébastien Betbeder: the police officer
- 2023: La Syndicaliste by Jean-Paul Salomé: Chambard
- 2024: Sur un fil by Reda Kateb: Jo
- 2024: Bergers by Sophie Deraspe: Clotilde
- 2025: La Petite Dernière by Hafsia Herzi
- 2025: Miss Mermaid by Pauline Brunner and Marion Verle: Fanny

==== Short films ====
- 2017 : Chougmuud by Cécile Telerman – Talents Cannes Adami: Lucie
- 2018 : Drifted by Emilie Lesgourgues
- 2019 : La Route du sel by Matthieu Vigneau: Christalle
- 2022 : Laeticia35 by Victoria Musiedlak: Carole
- 2023 : [Des jeunes filles enterrent leur vie by Maïté Sonnet: Marguerite

=== Television ===
- 2016: Trepalium (Arte): Vali (6 episodes)
- 2018 : Je ne t'aime pas (Arte Numérique) by Tommy Weber
- 2018: Je sais tomber (Arte) by Alain Tasma: Julius
- 2018 : Call My Agent! by Marc Fitoussi: Lucie
- 2020: Possessions (Canal+) by Thomas Vincent: Jessica (6 episodes)
- 2021: Stalk (France.tv Slash): Charlie (10 episodes) (season 2)
- 2021: Christmas Flow (Netflix) by Nadège Loiseau: Jeanne (3 episodes)
- 2024: Des gens bien ordinaires (Canal+) by Ovidie: Sharon (season 2)

=== Dubbing ===
- 2022: Les Démons d'argile by Nuno Beato: Rosa

== Discography ==
=== EPs and albums ===
List of titles with chart positions
Titre	Album details	Highest position	
		(France)	(Belgium)
Jimy (EP)	Release date: 29 March 2019; Label: Initial Artist Services	121	—N/a
Dévorantes	Release date: 28 February 2020; Label: Initial Artist Services	38	36
Sauvage	Release date:7 October 2022; Label: Capitol Music France	89	—N/a
"–" indicates that the title has not been released or charted in the country.

=== Singles ===
List of titles with chart positions
Titre	Year	Highest position		Album
		(France)	(Belgium)	
Ailleurs Higher	2017	—N/a	—N/a	
Aphone	2017	—N/a	—N/a	
Hiver brûlant	2017	—N/a	—N/a	
Parfois faut	2019	—N/a	—N/a	Jimy
À l'horizontale	2019	—N/a	—N/a	Jimy and Dévorantes
Et cette tristesse	2019	—N/a	—N/a	Jimy and Dévorantes
Omowi	2020	—N/a	—N/a	Dévorantes
Focus	2022	—N/a	—N/a	Sauvage
Crop Top	2022	—N/a	—N/a	Sauvage
Love	2022	—N/a	—N/a	Sauvage
M'envoler	2022	—N/a	—N/a	Sauvage
"–" indicates that the title has not been released or charted in the country.
