= Le Pacte =

French film company

- Type: SAS
- Industry: Film
- Founded: November 19, 2007; 18 years ago
- Founder: Jean Labadie
- Headquarters: 5 rue Darcet, Paris, France
- Products: Motion pictures
- Services: Film distribution; Film promotion; Film production
- Website: le-pacte.com

Le Pacte is a French motion picture company headquartered in Paris. It specializes in film distribution, co-productions and international sales. It was founded by Jean Labadie in November 2007, shortly after he was forced out of his previous company, BAC Films. Since its creation, it has become one of the largest independent French distribution companies. It had a record number of admissions in 2019 with more than 6.5 million cumulative admissions.

== History ==
When Labadie launched Le Pacte, the company's first releases included Hana Makhmalbaf's Buddha Collapsed out of Shame, Ari Folman's Waltz with Bashir, Matteo Garrone's Gomorrah, Christophe Honoré's The Beautiful Person, François Ozon's Ricky and Jim Jarmusch's The Limits of Control.

In total, Le Pacte has distributed more than 200 films. Le Pacte has distributed films by many established filmmakers including Ken Loach (I, Daniel Blake, Sorry We Missed You), Arnaud Desplechin (My Golden Days, Oh Mercy!), Hirokazu Kore-eda (Shoplifters, The Truth), Todd Haynes (Dark Waters), Rodrigo Sorogoyen (The Realm, Mother) Jim Jarmusch (Only Lovers Left Alive, Paterson), Nanni Moretti (We Have a Pope, Mia Madre), Nicolas Winding Refn (Drive), Agnès Varda (Faces Places), Thomas Vinterberg )The Commune), Matteo Garrone (Dogman, Tale of Tales) and Bong Joon-ho (Snowpiercer). The company has also supported up-and-coming filmmakers such as Ladj Ly (Les Misérables), Sean Baker (The Florida Project, Red Rocket, Anora), Samir Guesmi (Ibrahim), Carlos Reygadas (Post Tenebras Lux), David Robert Mitchell (Under the Silver Lake), Arthur Harari (Onoda: 10,000 Nights in the Jungle), Kornél Mundruczó (Delta), the D'Innocenzo brothers (Bad Tales), and Justine Triet (In Bed with Victoria, Sibyl, Anatomy of a Fall).

The company has also been involved restoration and distribution of home video, including many classic films such as those by Federico Fellini (Il bidone, I clowns, Orchestra Rehearsal), Luigi Comencini (The Adventures of Pinocchio) and Jean-François Stévenin (Mischka, Double messieurs, Passe montagne).

Le Pacte is a member of the Syndicat des Distributeurs indépendants réunis européens (DIRE) alongside fourteen other distribution companies, including Ad Vitam, BAC Films, Capricci, Diaphana, Haut et Court, Les Films du Losange, Memento Distribution, Pyramide Distribution, Rezo Films, SBS Distribution, The Jokers, UFO Distribution, Wild Bunch Distribution and Zinc.

== Awards received by films distributed by Le Pacte ==
=== Academy Awards ===
- Waltz with Bashir by Ari Folman: nomination for Best Foreign Language Film for Israel (2008)
- Exit Through the Gift Shop by Banksy: nomination for Bsst Documentary Feature Film for Banksy and Jaimie D'Cruz (2011)
- The Salt of the Earth by Wim Wenders and Juliano Ribeiro Salgado: nomination for Best Documentary Feature Film for Wenders, Salgado, and David Rosier (2014)
- Timbuktu by Abderrahmane Sissako: nomination for Best Foreign Language Film for Mauritania (2014)
- Faces Places by Agnès Varda and JR: nomination for Best Documentary Feature Film for Varda, JR, and Rosalie Varda (2017)
- The Florida Project by Sean Baker: nomination for Best Supporting Actor for Willem Dafoe (2017)
- On Body and Soul by Ildikó Enyedi: nomination for Best International Feature Film for Hungary (2017)
- The Breadwinner by Nora Twomey: nomination for Best Animated Feature for Twomey and Anthony Leo (2017)
- Shoplifters by Hirokazu Kore-eda: nomination for Best International Feature Film for Japan (2018)
- Les Misérables by Ladj Ly: nomination for Best International Feature Film for France (2019)
- Anatomy of a Fall by Justine Triet: Best Original Screenplay for Triet and Arthur Harari, plus nominations for Best Picture for Marie-Ange Luciani and David Thion, Best Director, Best Actress for Sandra Hüller, and Best Film Editing for Laurent Sénéchal (2023)
- Anora by Sean Baker: Best Picture for Baker, Samantha Quan, and Alex Coco, Best Director, Best Original Screenplay for Baker, Best Actress for Mikey Madison, and Best Film Editing for Baker, plus a nomination for Best Supporting Actor for Yura Borisov (2024)

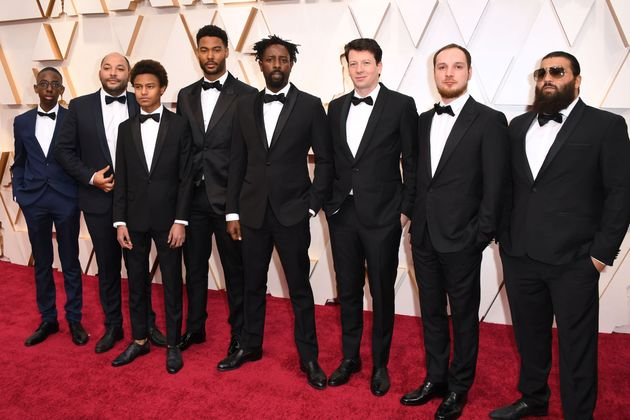
The cast of the film Les Misérables on the red carpet of the 92nd Academy Awards.

=== Cannes Film Festival ===
- Delta by Kornél Mundruczó: nomination for the Palme d'Or (2008)
- Gomorrah by Matteo Garrone: Grand Prix, plus a nomination for the Palme d'Or (2008)
- Waltz with Bashir by Ari Goldman: nomination for the Palme d'Or (2008)
- Tales from the Golden Age by Cristian Mungiu: nomination for the Prix Un Certain Regard (2009)
- Spring Fever by Lou Ye: Best Screenplay for Mei Feng, plus a nomination for the Palme d'Or (2009)
- The Time That Remains by Elia Suleiman: nomination for the Palme d'Or (2009)
- Thirst by Park Chan-wook: Jury Prize, plus a nomination for the Palme d'Or (2009)
- On Tour by Mathieu Amalric: Best Director, plus nominations for the Palme d'Or and Queer Palm (2010)
- The Tree by Julie Bertuccelli: Closing Film (2010)
- Beloved by Christophe Honoré: Closing Film (2011)
- Drive by Nicolas Winding Refn: Best Director, plus nomination for the Palme d'Or (2011)
- We Have a Pope by Nanni Moretti: nomination for the Palme d'Or (2011)
- The Yellow Sea by Na Hong-jin: nomination for the Prix Un Certain Regard (2011)
- Beyond the Hills by Cristian Mungiu: Best Screenplay for Mungiu and Best Actress for Cristina Flutur and Cosmina Stratan, plus a nomination for the Palme d'Or (2012)
- Post Tenebras Lux by Carlos Reygadas: Best Director, plus a nomination for the Palme d'Or (2012)
- Reality by Matteo Garrone: Grand Prix, plus a nomination for the Palme d'Or (2012)
- The Angels' Share by Ken Loach: Jury Prize, plus a nomination for the Palme d'Or (2012)
- The Taste of Money by Im Sang-soo: nomination for the Palme d'Or (2012)
- Heli by Amat Escalante: Best Director, plus a nomination for the Palme d'Or (2013)
- Only Lovers Left Alive by Jim Jarmusch: nomination for the Palme d'Or (2013)
- Like Father, Like Son by Hirokazu Kore-eda: Jury Prize, plus a nomination for the Palme d'Or (2013)
- Jimmy's Hall by Ken Loach: nomination for the Palme d'Or (2014)
- Lost River by Ryan Gosling: nominations for the Prix Un Certain Regard and Caméra d'Or (2014)
- Maps to the Stars by David Cronenberg: Best Actress for Julianne Moore, plus a nomination for the Palme d'Or (2014)
- The Salt of the Earth by Wim Wenders and Juliano Ribeiro Salgado: Un Certain Regard Special Jury Prize, plus a nomination for the Prix Un Certain Regard (2014)
- Timbuktu by Abderrahmane Sissako: Prize of the Ecumenical Jury and François Chalais Prize, plus a nomination for the Palme d'Or (2014)
- I Am a Soldier by Laurent Larivière: nominations for the Prix Un Certain Regard and Camera d'Or (2014)
- Jauja by Lisandro Alonso: nomination for the Prix Un Certain Regard (2014)
- Snow in Paradise by Andrew Hulme: nomination for the Prix Un Certain Regard (2014)
- Mia Madre by Nanni Moretti: Prize of the Ecumenical Jury, plus a nomination for the Palme d'Or (2015)
- Our Little Sister by Hirokazu Kore-eda: nomination for the Palme d'Or (2015)
- Tale of Tales by Matteo Garrone: nomination for the Palme d'Or (2015)
- Valley of Love by Guillaume Nicloux: nomination for the Palme d'Or (2015)
- After the Storm by Hirokazu Kore-eda: nomination for the Prix Un Certain Regard (2016)
- The Aquatic Effect by Sólveig Anspach: Directors' Fortnight SACD Award (2016)
- I, Daniel Blake by Ken Loach: Closing Film; Palme d'Or (2016)
- Graduation by Cristian Mungiu: Best Director, plus a nomination for the Palme d'Or (2016)
- Paterson by Jim Jarmusch: nomination for the Palme d'Or (2016)
- The Neon Demon by Nicolas Winding Refn: nominations for the Palme d'Or and Queer Palm (2016)
- Ismael's Ghosts by Arnaud Desplechin: Opening Film (2017)
- Dogman by Matteo Garrone: Best Actor for Marcello Fonte, plus a nomination for the Palme d'Or (2018)
- Shoplifters by Hirokazu Kore-eda: Palme d'Or (2018)
- Under the Silver Lake by David Robert Mitchell: nomination for the Palme d'Or (2018)
- Yomeddine by Abu Bakr Shawky: François Chalais Prize, plus a nomination for the Palme d'Or (2018)
- Les Misérables by Ladj Ly: Jury Prize, plus a nomination for the Palme d'Or (2019)
- It Must Be Heaven by Elia Suleiman: Jury Special Mention, plus a nomination for the Palme d'Or (2019)
- Oh Mercy! by Arnaud Desplechin: nominations for the Palme d'Or and Queer Palm (2019)
- Sibyl by Justine Triet: nomination for the Palme d'Or (2019)
- Sorry We Missed You by Ken Loach: nomination for the Palme d'Or (2019)
- The Divide by Catherine Corsini: Queer Palm, plus a nomination for the Palme d'Or (2021)
- Flag Day by Sean Penn: nomination for the Palme d'Or (2021)
- Onoda: 10,000 Nights in the Jungle by Arthur Harari: Opening Film for Un Certain Regard; nomination for the Prix Un Certain Regard (2021)
- Red Rocket by Sean Baker: nomination for the Palme d'Or (2021)
- Three Floors by Nanni Moretti: nomination for the Palme d'Or (2021)
- Brother and Sister by Arnaud Desplechin: nomination for the Palme d'Or (2022)
- The Five Devils by Léa Mysius: nomination for the Queer Palm (2022)
- R.M.N. by Cristian Mungiu: nomination for the Palme d'Or (2022)
- A Brighter Tomorrow by Nanni Moretti: nomination for the Palme d'Or (2023)
- Anatomy of a Fall by Justine Triet: Palme d'Or, plus a nomination for the Queer Palm (2023)
- Homecoming by Catherine Corsini: nomination for the Palme d'Or (2023)
- Jeanne du Barry by Maïwenn: nomination for the Palme d'Or (2023)
- Monster by Hirokazu Kore-eda: Queer Palm and Best Screenplay for Yuji Sakamoto, plus a nomination for the Palme d'Or (2023)
- The Old Oak by Ken Loach: nomination for the Palme d'Or (2023)
- Anora by Sean Baker: Palme d'Or (2024)
- Megalopolis by Francis Ford Coppola: nomination for the Palme d'Or (2024)
- Fuori by Mario Martone: nomination for the Palme d'Or (2025)
- The Great Arch by Stéphane Demoustier: nomination for the Prix Un Certain Regard (2025)
- Left-Handed Girl by Shih-Ching Tsou: nomination for the Critics' Week Grand Prix (2025)
- My Father's Shadow by Akinola Davies Jr.: nominations for the Prix Un Certain Regard and Caméra d'Or (2025)
- The Beloved by Rodrigo Sorogoyen: nomination for the Palme d'Or (2026)
- The Birthday Party by Léa Mysius: nomination for the Palme d'Or (2026)
- La bola negra by Javier Calvo and Javier Ambrossi: Best Director (tied with Paweł Pawlikowski for Fatherland), plus nominations for the Palme d'Or and Queer Palm (2026)
- Fjord by Cristian Mungiu: Palme d'Or (2026)
- Lucy Lost by Olivier Clert: nomination for the Caméra d'Or (2026)
- Sheep in the Box by Hirokazu Kore-eda: nomination for the Palme d'Or (2026)

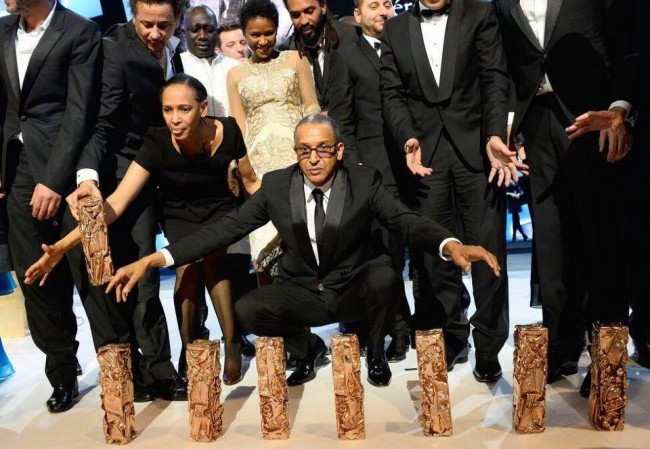
Director Abderrahmane Sissako with the 7 Césars for the film Timbuktu.

=== César Awards ===
- The Beautiful Person by Christophe Honoré: nominations for Best Adaptation, Most Promising Actor for Grégoire Leprince-Ringuet, and Most Promising Actress for Léa Seydoux (2009)
- Gomorrah by Matteo Garrone: nomination for Best Foreign Film (2009)
- Waltz with Bashir by Ari Folman: Best Foreign Film (2009)
- Making Plans for Lena by Christophe Honoré: nomination for Best Original Music (2010)
- On Tour by Mathieu Amalric: nominations for Best Film, Best Director, Best Original Screenplay, Best Cinematography, Best Editing, Best Sound, and Best Costume Design (2011)
- The Tree by Julie Bertuccelli: nominations for Best Adaptation, Best Actress for Charlotte Gainsbourg, and Best Original Music (2011)
- Beloved by Christophe Honoré: nomination for Best Original Music (2012)
- Drive by Nicolas Winding Refn: nomination for Best Foreign Film (2012)
- Looking for Hortense by Pascal Bonitzer: nominations for Best Actor for Jean-Pierre Bacri and Best Supporting Actor for Claude Rich (2013)
- The Angels' Share by Ken Loach: nomination for Best Foreign Film (2013)
- Bright Days Ahead by Marion Vernoux: nominations for Best Actress for Fanny Ardant and Best Supporting Actor for Patrick Chesnais (2014)
- Jimmy P: Psychotherapy of a Plains Indian by Arnaud Desplechin: nominations for Best Film, Best Director, and Best Adaptation (2014)
- The Last of the Unjust by Claude Lanzmann: nomination for Best Documentary Film (2014)
- The Nun by Guillaume Nicloux: nomination for Most Promising Actress for Pauline Étienne (2014)
- The Patience Stone by Atiq Rahimi: nomination for Most Promising Actress for Golshifteh Farahani (2014)
- Hippocrate by Thomas Lilti: Best Supporting Actor for Reda Kateb, plus nominations for Best Film, Best Director, Best Original Screenplay, Best Actor for Vincent Lacoste, Best Supporting Actress for Marianne Denicourt, and César Award for Best Editing (2015)
- Lulu in the Nude by Sólveig Anspach: nominations for Best Adaptation and Best Supporting Actress for Claude Gensac (2015)
- Minuscule: Valley of the Lost Ants by Hélène Giraud and Thomas Szabo: Best Animated Feature Film (2015)
- The Salt of the Earth by Wim Wenders and Juliano Ribeiro Salgado: Best Documentary Film (2015)
- Timbuktu by Abderrahmane Sissako: Best Film, Best Director, Best Original Screenplay, Best Cinematography, Best Original Music, Best Sound, and Best Editing, plus a nomination for Best Production Design (2015)
- My Golden Days by Arnaud Desplechin: Best Director, plus nominations for Best Film, Best Original Screenplay, Most Promising Actor for Quentin Dolmaire, Most Promising Actress for Lou Roy-Lecollinet, Best Cinematography, Best Editing, Best Original Music, Best Costume Design, and Best Production Design (2016)
- Valley of Love by Guillaume Nicloux: Best Cinematography, plus nominations for Best Actor for Gérard Depardieu and Best Actress for Isabelle Huppert (2016)
- A Kid by Philippe Lioret: nominations for Best Actor for Pierre Deladonchamps and Best Supporting Actor for Gabriel Arcand (2017)
- The Aquatic Effect by Sólveig Anspach: Best Original Screenplay (2017)
- Graduation by Cristian Mungiu: nomination for Best Foreign Film (2017)
- I, Daniel Blake by Ken Loach: Best Foreign Film (2017)
- In Bed with Victoria by Justine Triet: nominations for Best Film, Best Original Screenplay, Best Actress for Virginie Efira, Best Supporting Actor for Vincent Lacoste and Melvil Poupaud (2017)
- Irreplaceable by Thomas Lilti: nomination for Best Actor for François Cluzet
- Mr. & Mrs. Adelman by Nicolas Bedos: nominations for Best Actress for Doria Tillier and Best First Film (2018)
- Faces Places by Agnès Varda and JR: nominations for Best Original Music and Best Documentary Film (2018)
- An Impossible Love by Catherine Corsini: nominations for Best Adaptation, Best Actress for Virginie Efira, Most Promising Actress for Camille Berthomier, and Best Original Music (2019)
- The Prayer by Cédric Kahn: nomination for Most Promising Actor for Anthony Bajon (2019)
- Shoplifters by Hirokazu Kore-eda: Best Foreign Film (2019)
- Oh Mercy! by Arnaud Desplechin: Best Actor for Roschdy Zem, plus nominations for Best Film, Best Director, Best Adaptation, Best Supporting Actress for Sara Forestier, Best Cinematography, and Best Original Music (2020)
- Les Misérables by Ladj Ly: Best Film, Audience Award, Most Promising Actor for Alexis Manenti, and Best Editing, plus nominations for Best Director, Best Original Screenplay, César Award for Best Actor for Damien Bonnard, Best First Film, Best Cinematography, Best Original Music, Most Promising Actor for Djebril Zonga, and Best Sound (2020)
- Dark Waters by Todd Haynes: nomination for Best Foreign Film (2021)
- DNA by Maïwenn: nominations for Best Director, Best Supporting Actor for Louis Garrel, Best Supporting Actress for Fanny Ardant, and Best Original Music (2021)
- The Girl with a Bracelet by Stéphane Demoustier: Best Adaptation, plus a nomination for Most Promising Actress for Mélissa Guers (2021)
- Mama Weed by Jean-Paul Salomé: nomination for Best Adaptation (2021)
- The Divide by Catherine Corsini: Best Supporting Actress for Aïssatou Diallo Sagna, plus nominations for Best Film, Best Actor for Pio Marmaï, Best Actress for Valeria Bruni Tedeschi, Best Original Screenplay, and Best Editing (2022)
- Onoda: 10,000 Nights in the Jungle by Arthur Harari: Best Original Screenplay, plus nominations for Best Film, Best Director, and Best Cinematography (2022)
- Rookies by Thierry Demaizière and Alban Teurlai: nomination for Best Documentary Film (2023)
- Anatomy of a Fall by Justine Triet: Best Film, Best Director, Best Original Screenplay, Best Actress for Sandra Hüller, Best Supporting Actor for Swann Arlaud, and Best Editing, plus nominations for Best Supporting Actor for Antoine Reinartz, Best Male Revelation for Milo Machado-Graner, Best Cinematography, Best Sound, and Best Production Design (2024)
- Jeanne du Barry by Maïwenn: nominations for Best Costume Design and Best Production Design (2024)
- Borgo by Stéphane Demoustier: Best Actress for Hafsia Herzi, plus a nomination for Best Original Screenplay (2025)
- Anora by Sean Baker: nomination for Best Foreign Film (2025)
- The Great Arch by Stéphane Demoustier: Best Production Design and Best Visual Effects, plus nominations for Best Director, Best Adaptation, Best Actor for Claes Bang, and Best Supporting Actor for Swann Arlaud, Xavier Dolan, and Michel Fau (2026)

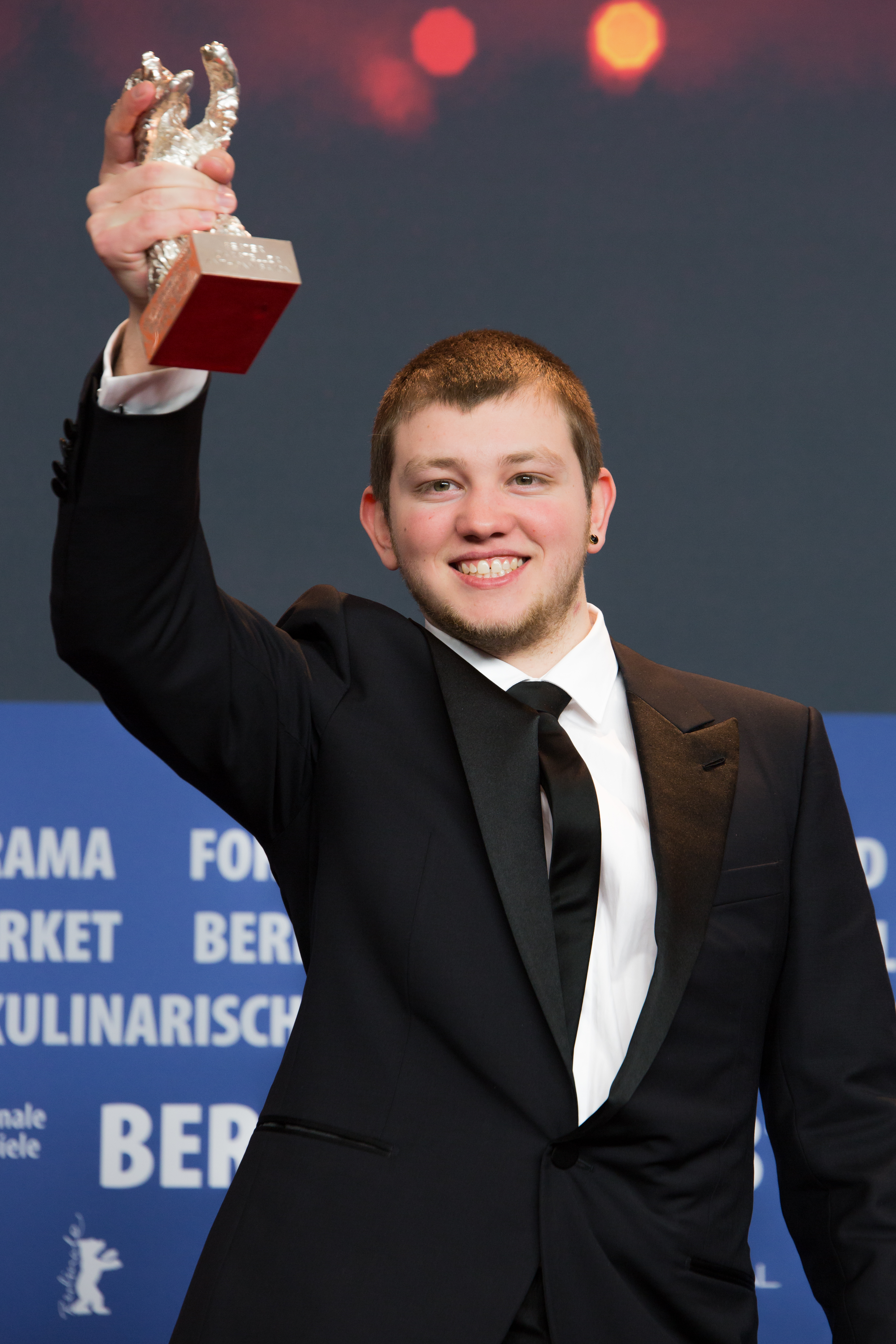
For his performance in The Prayer, Anthony Bajon became the 7th French actor to win the Silver Bear for Best Actor at the Berlinale, in 2018.

=== Berlin International Film Festival ===
- Ricky by François Ozon: nomination for the Golden Bear (2009)
- The Nun by Guillaume Nicloux: nominations for the Golden Bear and Teddy Award (2013)
- Life of Riley by Alain Resnais: nomination for the Golden Bear (2014)
- The Commune by Thomas Vinterberg: Silver Bear for Best Actress for Trine Dyrholm, plus a nomination for the Golden Bear (2016)
- On Body and Soul by Ildikó Enyedi: Golden Bear and Prize of the Ecumenical Jury (2017)
- The Prayer by Cédric Kahn: Silver Bear for Best Actor for Anthony Bajon, plus a nomination for the Golden Bear (2018)
- Monos by Alejandro Landes: nomination for the Teddy Award (2019)
- Bad Tales by Damiano and Fabio D'Innocenzo: Silver Bear for Best Screenplay, plus a nomination for the Golden Bear (2020)
- Berlin Alexanderplatz by Burhan Qurbani: nominations for the Golden Bear and Teddy Award (2020)

=== Venice Film Festival ===
- Happy Few by Antony Cordier: nominations for the Golden Lion and Queer Lion (2010)
- The Solitude of Prime Numbers by Saverio Costanzo: Best Actress for Alba Rohrwacher, plus a nomination for the Golden Lion (2010)
- Chicken with Plums by Marjane Satrapi and Vincent Paronnaud: nomination for the Golden Lion (2011)
- Looking for Hortense by Pascal Bonitzer: nomination for the Queer Lion (2012)
- Joe by David Gordon Green: Marcello Mastroianni Award for Tye Sheridan, plus a nomination for the Golden Lion
- The Zero Theorem by Terry Gilliam: nomination for the Golden Lion (2013)
- Summer Nights by Mario Fanfani: Queer Lion (2014)
- The Untamed by Amat Escalante: Silver Lion, plus nominations for the Golden Lion and Queer Lion (2016)
- The Third Murder by Hirokazu Kore-eda: nomination for the Golden Lion (2017)
- The Perfect Candidate by Haifaa Al-Mansour: nomination for the Golden Lion (2019)
- The Truth by Hirokazu Kore-eda: Opening film (2019)
- America Latina by Damiano and Fabio D'Innocenzo: nomination for the Golden Lion (2020)
- Our Ties by Roschdy Zem: nomination for the Golden Lion (2022)
- Orphan by László Nemes: nomination for the Golden Lion (2025)

== Box office ==
Sources : cbo-boxoffice.com and le-pacte.com

Rank	Title	Production country	Director	Year	Domestic attendance
1	Les Misérables	France	Ladj Ly	2019	2,181,860
2	Anatomy of a Fall	France	Justine Triet	2023	1,868,352
3	Drive	United States	Nicolas Winding Refn	2011	1,587,898
4	Minuscule: Valley of the Lost Ants	France	Thomas Szabo & Hélène Giraud	2014	1,552,713
5	Irreplaceable	France	Thomas Lilti	2016	1,511,258
6	Timbuktu	Mauritania, France	Abderrahmane Sissako	2014	1,260,760
7	Première Année	France	Thomas Lilti	2018	1,014,821
8	I, Daniel Blake	United Kingdom	Ken Loach	2016	955,737
9	Hippocrate	France	Thomas Lilti	2014	954,723
10	Rebels	France	Allan Mauduit	2019	925,503

== Selected filmography ==
The films distributed by Le Pacte are:

- 2008: The Beautiful Person by Christophe Honoré
- 2009: Ricky by François Ozon
- 2010: On Tour by Mathieu Amalric
- 2011: We Have a Pope by Nanni Moretti
- 2011: Chicken with Plums by Marjane Satrapi and Vincent Paronnaud
- 2011: Beloved by Christophe Honoré
- 2012: Looking for Hortense by Pascal Bonitzer
- 2012: Reality by Matteo Garrone
- 2012: The Angels' Share by Ken Loach
- 2013: Snowpiercer by Bong Joon-ho
- 2013: Diana by Oliver Hirschbiegel
- 2013: Post Tenebras Lux by Carlos Reygadas
- 2014: Timbuktu by Abderrahmane Sissako
- 2014: Hippocrate by Thomas Lilti
- 2014: Minuscule: Valley of the Lost Ants by Thomas Szabo and Hélène Giraud
- 2014: The Salt of the Earth by Win Wenders and Juliano Ribeiro Salgado
- 2014: The Zero Theorem by Terry Gilliam
- 2014: Maps to the Stars by David Cronenberg
- 2014: Life of Riley by Alain Resnais
- 2015: Valley of Love by Guillaume Nicloux
- 2015: Mia Madre by Nanni Moretti
- 2015: The Brand New Testament by Jaco Van Dormael
- 2015: Tale of Tales by Matteo Garrone
- 2015: My Golden Days by Arnaud Desplechin
- 2015: Jauja by Lisandro Alonso
- 2016: Irreplaceable by Thomas Lilti
- 2016: I, Daniel Blake by Ken Loach
- 2016: In Bed with Victoria by Justine Triet
- 2016: Saint-Amour by Benoît Delépine and Gustave Kervern
- 2016: Paterson by Jim Jarmusch
- 2016: Endless Poetry by Alejandro Jodorowsky
- 2016: The Neon Demon by Nicolas Winding Refn
- 2017: Faces Places by Agnès Varda and JR
- 2017: Ismael's Ghosts by Arnaud Desplechin
- 2017: Mr. & Mrs. Adelman by Nicolas Bedos
- 2018: Première Année by Thomas Lilti
- 2018: An Impossible Love by Catherine Corsini
- 2018: Roulez jeunesse by Julien Guetta
- 2018: Place publique by Agnès Jaoui
- 2018: The Prayer by Cédric Kahn
- 2019: It Must Be Heaven by Elia Suleiman
- 2019: Les Misérables by Ladj Ly
- 2019: Oh Mercy! by Arnaud Desplechin
- 2019: Sorry We Missed You by Ken Loach
- 2019: The Realm by Rodrigo Sorogoyen
- 2019: Rebels by Allan Mauduit
- 2019: Pinocchio by Matteo Garrone (direct-to-video release on Amazon Prime Video as a result of the COVID-19 pandemic)
- 2019: Mother by Rodrigo Sorogoyen
- 2020: The Girl with a Bracelet by Stéphane Demoustier
- 2020: Mama Weed by Jean-Paul Salomé
- 2020: DNA by Maïwenn
- 2021: Ibrahim by Samir Guesmi
- 2021: The Speech by Laurent Tirard
- 2021: Deception by Arnaud Desplechin
- 2021: Where Is Anne Frank by Ari Folman
- 2021: Three Floors by Nanni Moretti
- 2021: The Divide by Catherine Corsini
- 2021: Adieu Paris by Édouard Baer
- 2022: Brother and Sister by Arnaud Desplechin
- 2022: The Beasts by Rodrigo Sorogoyen
- 2022: The Five Devils by Léa Mysius
- 2023: The Sitting Duck by Jean-Paul Salomé
- 2023: Jeanne du Barry by Maïwenn
- 2023: Homecoming by Catherine Corsini
- 2023: Anatomy of a Fall by Justine Triet
- 2023: A Real Job by Thomas Lilti
- 2023: The Old Oak by Ken Loach
- 2024: Borgo by Stéphane Demoustier
- 2025: Two Pianos by Arnaud Desplechin
- 2025: The Great Arch by Stéphane Demoustier
- 2025: Fuori by Mario Martone
- 2025: Los Tigres by Alberto Rodríguez

=== International films ===
Le Pacte handled the French distribution of the following international titles that were not co-produced by France:

- 2008: Gomorrah by Matteo Garrone (Italy)
- 2008: Bronson by Nicolas Winding Refn (UK)
- 2009: Rec 2 by Jaume Balagueró and Paco Plaza (Spain)
- 2010: Exit Through the Gift Shop by Banksy (UK)
- 2010: Jack Goes Boating by Philip Seymour Hoffman (US)
- 2011: Drive by Nicolas Winding Refn (US)
- 2011: The Yellow Sea by Na Hong-jin (South Korea)
- 2012: I Wish by Hirokazu Kore-eda (Japan)
- 2012: Rec 3: Genesis by Paco Plaza (Spain)
- 2013: Like Father, Like Son by Hirokazu Kore-eda (Japan)
- 2013: Seven Psychopaths by Martin McDonagh (UK / US)
- 2014: Rec 4: Apocalypse by Jaume Balagueró (Spain)
- 2014: The Raid 2 by Gareth Evans (Indonesia / US)
- 2014: Only Lovers Left Alive by Jim Jarmusch (UK / Germany)
- 2015: Marshland by Alberto Rodriguez (Spain)
- 2015: Lost River by Ryan Gosling (US)
- 2015: The Voices by Marjane Satrapi (US / Germany)
- 2017: The Commune by Thomas Vinterberg (Denmark)
- 2017: The Florida Project by Sean Baker (US)
- 2017: May God Save Us by Rodrigo Sorogoyen (Spain)
- 2018: Shoplifters by Hirokazu Kore-eda (Japan)
- 2018: Under the Silver Lake by David Robert Mitchell (US)
- 2018: Dogman by Matteo Garrone (Italy)
- 2019: Dark Waters by Todd Haynes (US)
- 2021: Flag Day by Sean Penn (US)
- 2022: Red Rocket by Sean Baker (US)
- 2024: Megalopolis by Francis Ford Coppola (US)
- 2024: Anora by Sean Baker (US)
- 2024: The Day the Earth Blew Up: A Looney Tunes Movie by Pete Browngardt (US)
- 2024: Heretic by Scott Beck and Bryan Woods (US)
