= Brother and Sister (2022 film) =

- Theatrical release poster
- French: Frère et Sœur
- Directed by: Arnaud Desplechin
- Written by: Arnaud Desplechin; Julie Peyr; Naïla Guiguet
- Starring: Marion Cotillard; Melvil Poupaud; Golshifteh Farahani; Patrick Timsit; Benjamin Siksou
- Edited by: Laurence Briaud
- Music by: Grégoire Hetzel
- Production companies: Why Not Productions; Arte France Cinéma
- Distributed by: Le Pacte
- Release dates: 20 May 2022 (Cannes & France)
- Running time: 108 minutes
- Country: France
- Language: French

Brother and Sister (French: Frère et Sœur) is a 2022 French drama film directed by Arnaud Desplechin, co-written by Desplechin, Julie Peyr and Naila Guiguet. Starring Marion Cotillard and Melvil Poupaud as estranged siblings who are forced to reunite after two decades following the death of their parents.

The film had its world premiere at the 2022 Cannes Film Festival on 20 May, where it was nominated for the Palme d'Or, it was theatrically released in France on the same day by Le Pacte.

== Plot ==
A memorial service is being held for a boy named Jacob. There, Louis, Jacob's father, sees André Borkman, his brother-in-law. They have been estranged for over ten years, and this new encounter escalates into a physical confrontation. After being kicked out, André finds his wife Alice crying. Louis demands them to leave, threatening to call the police.

Five years later, while driving to their daughter Alice's opening night of a play, (Note: More specifically, Pride and Prejudice.) Abel and his wife Marie-Louise stumble upon an ice road. There, a driver loses control of her car and hits a tree. While they try to help her, a truck nearby also loses control. In the ensuing accident, the girl dies while Alice's parents get severely injured.

Before the play starts, Alice reads Louis' latest novel, in which he portrays her in a humiliating way. It is the second time this happened; on the first, she tried to stop the novel's publication, which aggravated her delicate relationship with Louis and led them to become estranged. Alice then performs the play. She later learns of the accident, goes to the hospital and meets her younger brother Fidèle.

In the French countryside, Louis is living with his wife Faunia. After learning that his parents will die soon, Louis decides to come back to Lille — despite not seeing any of his relatives for the past five years.

After visiting the hospital, he decides to stay at his parents' apartment. He writes Alice a letter and asks Fidèle to deliver it.

On a rainy day, Alice encounters a fan, Lucia. Lucia is a Romanian immigrant, who lives on a shelter and has no job. Alice invites her for a drink and reveals why she hates Louis: years before, she was an established actress, and he was a struggling writer who often asked her for money. A novel he wrote eventually gained mainstream recognition. When the novel received an important prize, Alice started to realize that she hated her now financially independent and famous brother. Her husband, André, was a long-time friend of Louis.

Louis takes care of his dad at the hospital. There, he eventually sees Alice, who faints.

In a flashback, Alice and André get married, despite Louis' objections. He says that he finds André not right for her. Alice informs Louis that she is pregnant.

At the hospital, Marie-Louise dies. A distraught Fidèle cannot make it to the morgue where he is expected to bring her burial clothes, so Louis goes in his place. There, he overhears André and Alice discuss the funeral, which she does not want Louis to attend.

Alice meets Lucia again, she plans to bury Marie-Louise and stop acting in the play. Lucia, who has not eaten anything for two days, nearly faints. Looking for food, Alice heads to the market and bumps into Louis.

At the hospital, Abel removes his oxygen mask and vitals monitors. He then walks into the corridor and dies.

Faunia travels to Lille for the funerals. Days after the funerals, Alice and Louis meet again.

Louis and Fidèle begin emptying their childhood apartment. Distraught, Louis climbs up to the rooftop and stands at the edge of the building. Everyone begs him to walk back. Alice then joins them. Louis asks for Fidèle and his boyfriend Simon to leave and reveals to Alice that he regrets all the years he loved her, not knowing that she had always hated him. Alice leaves him alone.

Louis eventually comes down and gets a fever. Alice helps him change, covers him with a blanket, and they lie in bed together.

Some time later, Louis is teaching again. Alice has relocated to Abomey, in Benin and sends him a letter. In it, She says that she has left everything behind: The theater, André, her son; and she feels alive.

== Cast ==
- Marion Cotillard as Alice Viullard
- Melvil Poupaud as Louis Vuillard
- Golshifteh Farahani as Faunia Vuillard
- Benjamin Siksou as Fidèle Vuillard
- Max Baisette De Malglaive as Joseph Vuillard
- Francis Leplay as André Borkman
- Alexander Pavloff as Simon
- Patrick Timsit as Zwy
- Joël Cudennec as Abel Viullard
- Cosmina Stratan as Lucia
- Clément Hervieu-Léger as Pierre
- Nicolette Picheral as Marie-Louise Vuillard

== Production ==
On 12 April 2021, Arte France Cinéma announced they were backing Arnaud Desplechin's next film, Brother and Sister. Marking Desplechin's third collaboration with Marion Cotillard after 1996's My Sex Life... or How I Got into an Argument and 2016's Ismael's Ghosts, and his second collaboration with Melvil Poupaud after 2008's A Christmas Tale. Golshifteh Farahani was announced in the cast on 16 January 2022. Grégoire Hetzel composed the score.

The film is a co-production between Why Not Productions and Arte France Cinéma.

=== Filming ===
Filming took place in Paris in October 2021, and in Lille and Roubaix in France between November and December 2021.

In order to create their characters' tumultuous relationship, Marion Cotillard said she felt "a strange need" to remain distant from Melvil Poupaud on set, something she had never felt before, but she felt it was necessary for this film to remain at a distance and not become too close to him. At the end of the shoot, Cotillard explained to Poupaud why she avoided him and apologized. Poupaud then understood why Cotillard avoided him during filming and said he found that "admirable".

=== Promotion ===
The first image of the film featuring Marion Cotillard was unveiled on 16 April 2022.

French distributor Le Pacte unveiled the first poster for the film on Twitter on 25 April 2022. On 27 April 2022, eight film stills were released.

The first official trailer was released on 4 May 2022. The same trailer with English subtitles was released on 9 May 2022.

The clips from the film were released on 18 May 2022.

== Release ==
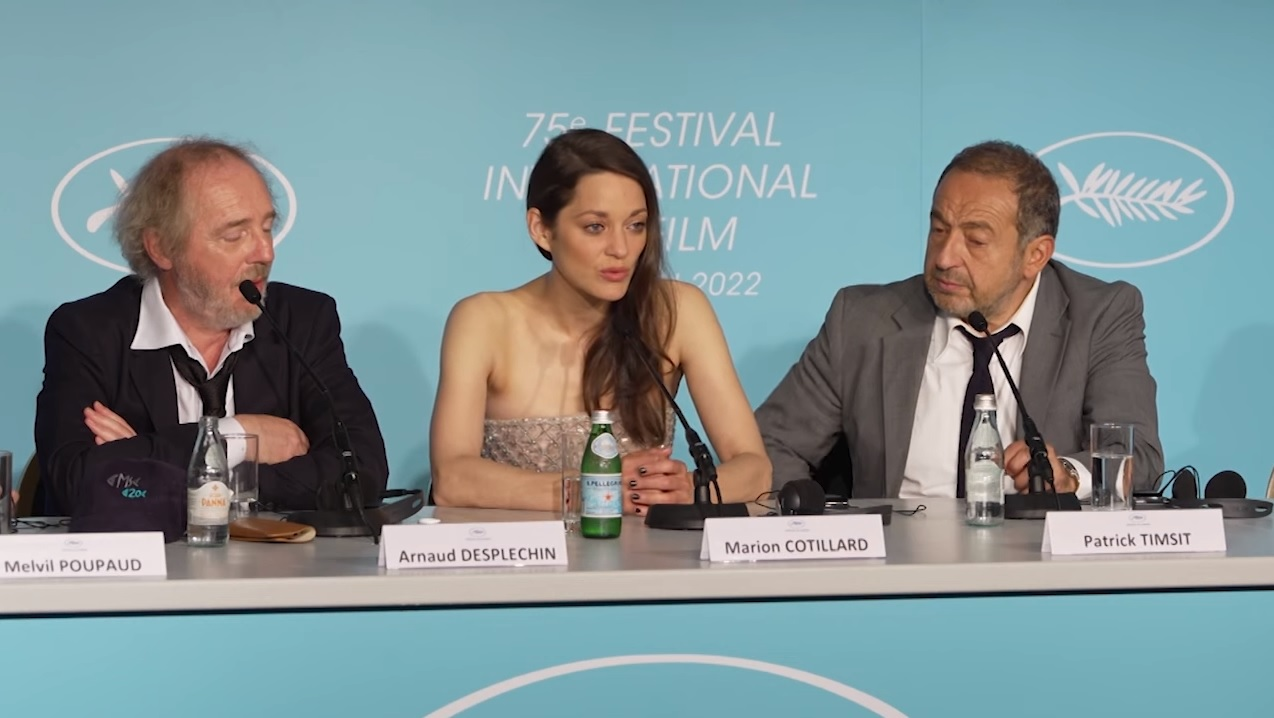
From left to right: Director Arnaud Desplechin and actors Marion Cotillard and Patrick Timsit during the press conference for Brother and Sister at the 2022 Cannes Film Festival.

The film had its world premiere at the 75th Cannes Film Festival in official competition on 20 May 2022. Distributor Le Pacte released the film theatrically in France at the same time of its Cannes premiere.

Brother and Sister's official soundtrack album was released on 4 July 2022.

=== Home video ===
The film was released on DVD and Blu-Ray in France on 26 October 2022. Both versions include deleted scenes and an interview with director Arnaud Desplechin.

== Reception ==
=== Critical response ===
AlloCiné, a French cinema website, gave the film an average rating of 4.1/5, based on a survey of 25 French reviews. Rotten Tomatoes gives the film a score of 60% based on 20 reviews, with a weighted average of 4.70/10.

Eric Neuhoff of Le Figaro gave the film five stars, stating, "It's called grace. Desplechin masters his subject from A to Z. Images are his natural language. He's not afraid of words either. He is a complete athlete of the cinema. He was believed to be Truffaut's heir. He is becoming our Bergman."

Thierry Cheze of Première gave the film four stars, writing, "After the disappointing Deception, Desplechin is back in great shape with a film in which he explores family love/hate stories with an ever so fascinating dexterity. Marion Cotillard finds one of her finest roles here."

Cahiers du Cinéma gave the film four stars, stating, "The beauty of Brother and Sister made our desire to meet Arnaud Desplechin urgent."

The Film Stage included Brother and Sister on its list of "The Best Undistributed Films of 2022", stating, Brother and Sister, Arnaud Desplechin's tale of feuding siblings who re-enter each other's orbits after their parents get in a car accident, is the sort of heightened melodrama that will have some viewers laughing or sneering (or some combination of both). But if you're open to Desplechin's directorial whims or have an interest in fraught familial relationships, Brother and Sister is a compelling effort—defiant in its handling of conventional drama and unafraid to be as flawed as its characters."

=== Box office ===
In France, Brother and Sister was released to 296 screens, where it debuted at number four at the box office, selling 73,784 tickets. It sold a total of 235,198 tickets after 9 weeks in cinemas.

== Accolades ==
Award / Film Festival	Date of ceremony	Category	Recipient(s)	Result	Ref(s)
Cannes Film Festival	28 May 2022	Palme d'Or	Arnaud Desplechin	Nominated	
