= The Money Maker =

2025 French film by Jean-Paul Salomé

- French: L'Affaire Bojarski
- Directed by: Jean-Paul Salomé
- Written by: Jean-Paul Salomé; Bastien Daret
- Produced by: Bertrand Faivre; Florence Gastaud
- Starring: Reda Kateb; Sara Giraudeau; Bastien Bouillon; Pierre Lottin
- Music by: Mathieu Lamboley
- Production companies: Le Bureau; Les Compagnons du cinéma
- Distributed by: Le Pacte (France)
- Release dates: 21 September 2025 (Montélimar); 14 January 2026 (France)
- Running time: 128 minutes
- Country: France
- Language: French
- Budget: €9.6 million

The Money Maker (French: L'Affaire Bojarski, lit. 'the Bojarski affair') is a 2025 French drama film directed by Jean-Paul Salomé from a screenplay he co-wrote with Bastien Daret. Inspired by the true story of Jan Bojarski, a Polish refugee who became one of postwar France's most accomplished counterfeiters, the film stars Reda Kateb as Bojarski and Bastien Bouillon as the police commissioner who spends over a decade trying to catch him, alongside Sara Giraudeau and Pierre Lottin.

The film premiered at the De l'écrit à l'écran festival in Montélimar on 21 September 2025 and went on general release in France, distributed by Le Pacte, on 14 January 2026. It was sold internationally under the English-language title The Money Maker.

== Plot ==
In the years after the Second World War, Jan Bojarski, a Polish engineer who fled to France, struggles to rebuild his life. Lacking official papers, he is unable to patent any of his inventions and is reduced to poorly paid odd jobs despite his obvious talent, a humiliation that leaves him consumed by a sense of injustice. When a gangster who has noticed his near-obsessive precision offers him a way to put his skills to use, Bojarski reluctantly agrees to counterfeit banknotes.

Working alone in a workshop hidden beneath his garden shed, Bojarski builds his own printing presses, manufactures his own watermarked paper, mixes his own inks and engraves his own plates, turning out forgeries so precise that the Bank of France cannot always tell them from genuine notes. As his technique improves and the scale of his fraud grows, he becomes the bank's most-wanted target and is nicknamed the "Cézanne of counterfeit money".

Away from his workshop, Bojarski leads an outwardly ordinary life in the Paris suburbs with his wife, Suzanne, and their children, who believe he works as a travelling salesman. The film traces his growing isolation, torn between devotion to his family and the secret that separates him from them, as Suzanne slowly begins to suspect the truth.

Opposite him, Commissioner André Mattei, regarded as one of France's finest detectives, turns the hunt for the counterfeiter into a personal obsession that consumes him as thoroughly as the forgeries consume Bojarski. Their pursuit plays out as a long-distance duel of false leads and near-misses, with Bojarski repeatedly slipping through the police's fingers and defying the state for more than a year before he is finally caught and made to answer for his crimes.

== Cast ==
- Reda Kateb as Jan Bojarski
- Sara Giraudeau as Suzanne Bojarski
- Bastien Bouillon as Commissioner André Mattei
- Pierre Lottin as Anton Dowgierd, Bojarski's Polish friend
- Quentin Dolmaire as Perrier, Mattei's deputy
- Victor Poirier as Serge, an associate to Bojarski
- Olivier Loustau as Lucien Scola, a mob boss who recruits Bojarski
- Lolita Chammah as Françoise Mattei, the commissioner's third wife
- Camille Japy as Anaïs, Suzanne's mother
- Francis Leplay as Victor, Suzanne's father
- Arthur Teboul as Pollet
- François Pérache as the director of the Bank of France
- Alain Bouzigues as Antoine Pinay

== Production ==
=== Development ===
The Money Maker was produced by Le Bureau and Les Compagnons du cinéma, in a co-production with Auvergne-Rhône-Alpes Cinéma and with backing from four SOFICA funds. International sales were handled by The Bureau Sales, which introduced the project to buyers at the 2025 European Film Market under its English title.

To research the film, Salomé and co-writer Bastien Daret consulted Jacques Briod, a Swiss journalist who had amassed a large archive on Bojarski, including copies of the patents he had filed. Salomé has said he approached The Money Maker as a genre film steeped in the atmosphere of 1950s and 1960s French cinema, drawing up a list of reference films for his cast and crew to watch together. Jean-Pierre Melville's work with Alain Delon dominated the list, particularly Le Samouraï, Un flic and Le Cercle rouge, from which Salomé borrowed the name of the police commissioner Mattei. Other cited influences included Joseph Losey's Monsieur Klein, Jean Gabin vehicles such as Jacques Becker's Touchez pas au grisbi, Jules Dassin's Du rififi chez les hommes and Henri Decoin's Razzia sur la chnouf, as well as Martin Scorsese's Casino for the film's opening sequence and Michael Mann's Heat as a model for the extended dialogue scene between Bojarski and Mattei. Co-writer Bastien Daret has also cited Claude Sautet's Un cœur en hiver, Jacques Rivette's La Belle Noiseuse, Michael Mann's Le Solitaire and Patrice Leconte's Tandem as influences on the film's intimate portrait of Bojarski.

Reda Kateb prepared for the role of Bojarski by rewatching Jean Renoir's La Bête humaine, Marcel Carné's Le Jour se lève and Melville's L'Armée des ombres, while Bastien Bouillon studied films starring Paul Meurisse, another regular Melville actor, to prepare for his role as Mattei.

=== Filming ===
Principal photography took place in Lyon, Paris and Vichy and wrapped on 5 March 2025. For historical accuracy in the counterfeiting scenes, Salomé consulted Vincent Guillier, a typographer and publisher who is one of the last people in France to print on traditional letterpresses and hand-produce chapbooks. Guillier's own presses, housed in a workshop converted from his garage, were used both to shoot the film's printing scenes and to recreate Bojarski's workshop, which in reality was hidden in the basement of his house.

== Release ==
The Money Maker had its world premiere at the De l'écrit à l'écran festival in Montélimar on 21 September 2025, and was screened as a preview at the Lumière Festival in Lyon on 19 October 2025. It went on general release in France on 14 January 2026, distributed by Le Pacte, followed by releases in Belgium on 21 January 2026 (O'Brother Distribution) and French-speaking Switzerland on 28 January 2026 (Filmcoopi), with a Quebec release by TVA Films set for 10 April 2026. In North America, the film screened at showcases including Film at Lincoln Center's Rendez-Vous with French Cinema in New York and the Cinémania festival in Montreal under its English title.

== Reception ==
=== Critical response ===
Writing in Le Monde, Jacques Mandelbaum described the film as a portrait of "an artist as counterfeiter", framing Bojarski as a case of an artist who, starved of recognition, is ultimately driven to betray himself. Le Nouvel Observateur called it "a good old-fashioned entertainment about a counterfeiter of genius", pointing to its debt to Melville's Le Cercle rouge. Cineuropa's English-language review praised Reda Kateb's performance, writing that he "dazzles as an ingenious counterfeiter" in a film that "strikes a perfect balance between different genres".

=== Box office ===
The film had a strong opening in France and went on to sell more than 1.16 million tickets, crossing the one-million-admissions mark during its theatrical run.

== Accolades ==
Award / Festival	Date	Category	Recipient(s)	Result	Ref.
Festival Jean-Carmet	2025	Jury Prize for Best Supporting Actor	Bastien Bouillon	Won	
Festival Jean-Carmet	2025	Audience Award for Best Supporting Actor	Bastien Bouillon	Won	
