= Maureen Kearney =

Irish syndicalist at Areva

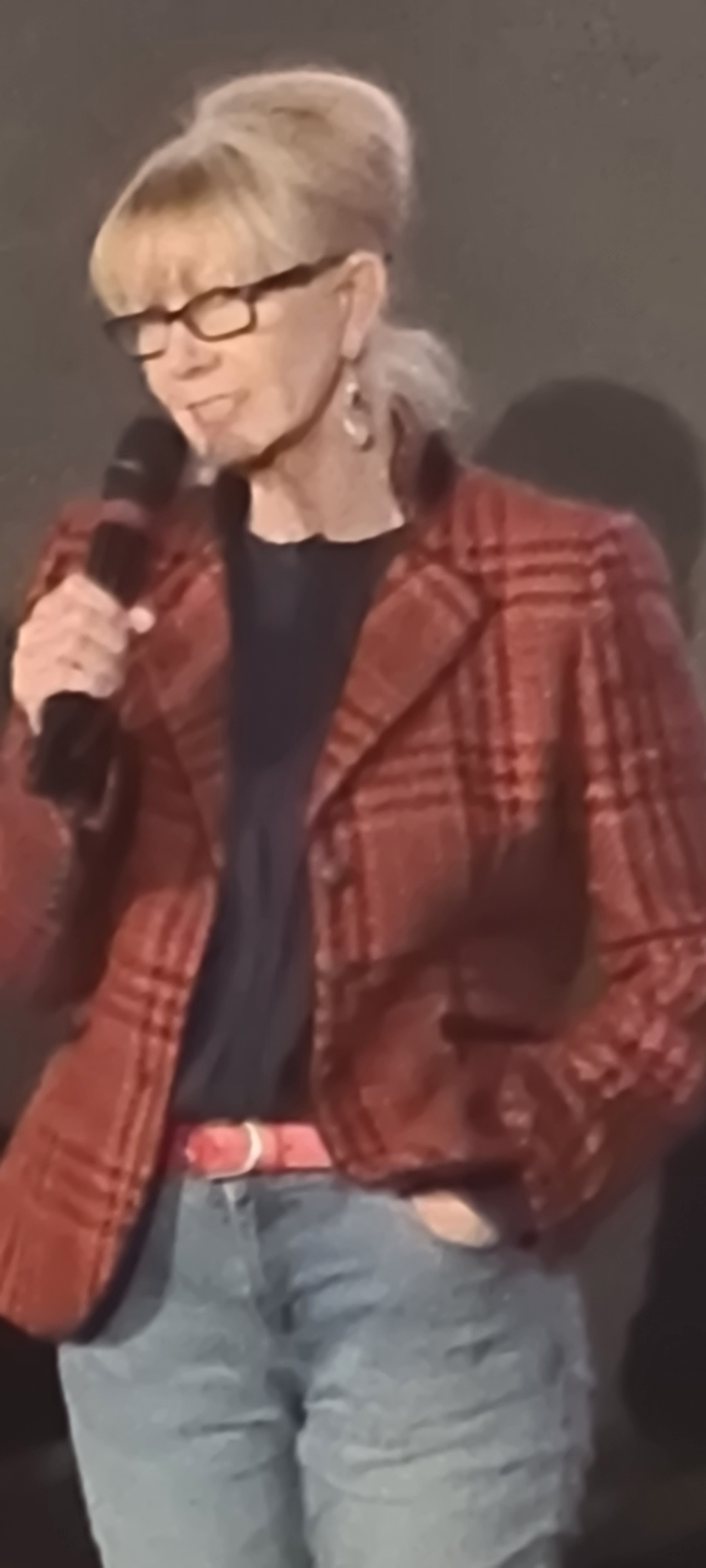
- Kearney in March 2023
- Born: 1956 (age 69–70); Castlebar, Co Mayo, Ireland
- Citizenship: Ireland
- Occupations: Trade unionist; language teacher
- Spouse: Gilles Hugo

Maureen Kearney is an Irish whistleblower, a teacher of English, and trade unionist at Areva. A union official of the CFDT, she was elected secretary of the European group committee of Areva in 2004. Later she alerted the press and politicians to the existence of a secret contract involving technology transfers to China.

On the morning of 17 December 2012, Kearney's home was broken into, after which she was bound, beaten and sexually assaulted. She was then left tied up in the basement of her home. She was later found alive by her cleaning lady.

In the months following her assault, Kearney was subjected to brutal police custody. She admitted to making up the story and withdrew her complaint of "kidnapping, violence with a weapon and rape". She was accused of making up the story and charged and convicted of fabrication.

Later she explained her confession by saying that her daughter and grandchild were threatened. She was subsequently cleared of the charge of fabrication.

== Family, arrival in France and union involvement ==
Kearney grew up in an Irish family of trade unionists where it was customary to say that everyone “has two hands, one to help themselves and the second to help others”. Her mother campaigned for the release of Nelson Mandela in early 1990; Kearney became a feminist in high school. In the mid-1980s, she moved to the village of Auffargis, Yvelines in France with her husband Gilles.

After the birth of their daughter, in 1987, Kearney was hired by Société Générale pour les Techniques Nouvelles (SGN), a subsidiary of the Cogema group (later Areva), to teach English to technicians who were going to work outside France.

Outraged at having seen young engineers fired without compensation, she joined the CFDT, becoming its “figurehead” at Areva.

== Secretary of the Areva group committee ==
Logo of Areva since 2018.

In June 2009, Maureen Kearney led an Areva delegation to the Elysées presidential palace. A sale of nuclear technology by Areva to China was later cancelled.

Then in 2012 a new and secret contract was signed with China for the transfer of nuclear technology. Kearney became aware of it via a whistleblower and she became a whistleblower. (The prime minister François Fillon was made aware of the secret deal in 2011). At first, when confronted with questions by the trade unions, the management of Areva denied the existence of such a contract. Before and after the 2012 presidential election, Kearney and other trade unionists met government ministers and parliamentary deputies. Several deputies stated publicly at the time that they wanted a parliamentary commission of inquiry; the government asked to “temporize, the time to carry out verifications”.

Meanwhile, the press confirms and relays the alerts concerning the negotiations which persist with Chinese companies concerning an international collaboration for nuclear projects. On 27 September 2012, Le Nouvel Obs published excerpts from a draft bipartite agreement between EDF and its partner CGNPC. On 3 October 2022, Le Canard enchaîné published a note from the APE (State Holdings Agency), entitled “alert relating to a draft cooperation agreement between EDF and CGNPC”.

== 2012: Intimidation, threats, rape and acts of barbarism ==
Despite the support of her inter-union, Kearney was the subject of anonymous threats which she described to journalists from L'Express she met at the end of October 2012. Her daughter told her that she felt that she was being followed. On 20 November, the Areva group committee unanimously voted a motion asking the CEO for the latest version of the tripartite agreement, signed on 19 October 2012 between Areva, EDF and the Chinese company CGNPC, specifying that a refusal would constitute an offence of obstruction. He still doesn't get it.

On 15 December, Ministers of the Interior Bernard Cazeneuve and of the Economy Arnaud Montebourg were contacted personally by Kearney and responded to her messages. The intimidation was repeated, forcing her to consult a psychiatrist and begin treatment. A few days later, on 17 December, she was the victim of a brutal rape in her house, tied to a chair. Her attacker threatened to murder her, telling her: “this is the second warning, there won't be a third”. The housekeeper discovered her six hours later and wanted to call the police; Kearney refused, citing fears of reprisals. It was finally her husband who imposed the call.

The rape was reported the next day by Libération, of which Lauvergeon chaired the supervisory board and confirmed by the CFDT and the Versailles prosecutor's office, which revealed ten days later that a letter had been engraved with a knife on the woman's abdomen. The trade unionists of the CFDT meet the DRH so that it is protected as a whistleblower. Two days after the assault, Areva announced to AFP that it was filing a complaint against the newspaper, which reported in a separate article on the concerns of the group committee. Michel Toudret, CFDT central delegate from Areva confirmed to the press that the unions “fear technology transfers with China” and that Maureen Kearney received threatening phone calls. The union also asked the press “to observe the greatest reserve in the name of the right to the preservation of one’s person, relatives and friends”.

== 2012: EDF industrial projects with China ==
Lauvergeon was heard by the investigators on 20 December 2012 and on 26 December, Le Canard Enchaîné revealed that Montebourg commissioned an investigation by the General Inspectorate of Finance (IGF) on the draft agreement between EDF and the Chinese company CGNPC.

L'Express revealed the same week that teams from EDF and the Chinese CGNPC continue to "work together", in Guangzhou, on "a nuclear reactor project competing with Atmea" (d' Areva) with “transfer requests” for part of its central architecture, for which Areva would be seven years ahead of its competitors”. L'Express specifies that the talks are progressing without Areva, whereas in February 2011 the French Nuclear Policy Committee (CPN) had decided: EDF can only join CGNPC with Areva28. The CEO of Areva replied on 30 December in an interview with the JDD that the “transfer of technology to China” will only be done “on a case-by-case basis”.

=== Threats and attack ===
Shortly after starting her campaign against the deal with China, Kearney was threatened several times. Her daughter also reported that she felt she had been persecuted during this time. When she did not back down and turned to Interior Minister Bernard Cazeneuve and Economics Minister Arnaud Montebourg, the threats intensified. She was forced to see a psychologist and seek treatment.

On December 17, 2012, a brutal attack is said to have taken place. A burglar tied Kearney to a chair and inserted an object into her vagina. She is also said to have been injured. An "A", which stands for either Areva or "Avertissement" (German "warning"), is said to have been carved into her stomach. The attacker also threatened her with death and described the barbaric act as a "second and final warning". Her cleaning lady only found and freed her several hours later. Kearney herself came under the investigators' scrutiny and, under pressure from the investigation, confessed to having staged the crime. Although she later retracted this confession, she was sentenced to five months' probation and a fine of 5,000 euros in a 2017 trial. In an appeal hearing a year later, she was acquitted and the deficiencies in the investigation were criticized. The robbery was never solved.

== In popular culture ==
Kearney is the subject of 2019 French book La Syndicaliste (literally The Trade Unionist) written by Caroline Michel-Aguirre, an investigative journalist for L'Obs.

The book was adapted in 2022 into the French-language thriller of the same name, known in English as The Sitting Duck directed by Jean-Paul Salomé with Isabelle Huppert playing Kearney.
