= Through the Air =

- Theatrical release poster
- Directed by: Fred Grivois
- Written by: Thomas Bidegain; Noé Debré; Fred Grivois
- Produced by: Charles-Marie Anthonioz; Mourad Belkeddar; Jean Duhamel; Nicolas Lhermitte
- Starring: Reda Kateb; Ludivine Sagnier
- Cinematography: Glynn Speeckaert
- Edited by: Géraldine Mangenot
- Music by: Evgueni Galperine; Sacha Galperine
- Production companies: Iconoclast; Gaumont; Nexus Factory uMedia
- Distributed by: Gaumont
- Release dates: 25 March 2015 (Beaune Film Festival); 17 June 2015 (France)
- Running time: 98 minutes
- Countries: France; Belgium
- Language: French

Through the Air (French title: La résistance de l'air) is a 2015 French-Belgian drama film directed by Fred Grivois. The film concerns an air rifle champion who becomes embroiled in a dangerous plot after accepting a well-paid job offer. The film stars Reda Kateb and Ludivine Sagnier.

== Cast ==
- Reda Kateb as Vincent Cavelle
- Ludivine Sagnier as Delphine Cavelle
- Tchéky Karyo as Armand Cavelle
- Johan Heldenbergh as Renaud
- Laure de Clermont-Tonnerre as Valérie
- Blanche Hemada Costoso as Alexia Cavelle
- Pascal Demolon as JP
- Sylvie Degryse as Evelyne
- Patrice Guillain as The assailant
- Hubert Saint-Macary as Armand's neighbour
- Jehon Gorani as Bob
- Damien Bonnard as A worker
- Lahcen Elmazouzi as The Turkish man
- Stella Mancini as Business woman
