= Jacques Deray Prize =

- Awarded for: Best French Policier Film of the Year
- Country: France
- Presented by: Institut Lumière
- First award: 2005
- Currently held by: Anatomy of a Fall (2024)
- Website: www.institut-lumiere.org

The Jacques Deray Prize (French: Prix Jacques-Deray) is a French film award presented annually since 2005. It celebrates the memory of the director Jacques Deray, who was known for directing many crime and thriller films. It was created by the Institut Lumière in collaboration with the Association des Amis de Jacques Deray.

== History ==
Jacques Deray was a French filmmaker who was known for directing many crime and thriller films, including La Piscine (1969) and Borsalino (1970). Following his death in 2003, the Jacques Deray Prize was created in Lyon, the filmmaker's hometown. It was created by the Institut Lumière, of which Jacques Deray was vice-president, in collaboration with the Association des Amis de Jacques Deray, which includes Deray's widow Agnès Vincent-Deray and his daughter Laurence Deray. It has been presented annually since 2005 to celebrate his memory. As of 2016, the jury consisted of Institut Lumière president Bertrand Tavernier, chairman (délégué général) Thierry Frémaux, and members of the association. The jury selects what they consider to be the best film of the year within the "policier" crime-thriller genre of French cinema.

The winner is presented with a bronze statuette which depicts a young girl with a butterfly on her shoulder, a reference to Deray's film Butterfly on the Shoulder (1978), as well as a direct reference to the director himself who kept a similar porcelain statuette on his desk. The director of the winning film is awarded the privilege of having their name inscribed on a plaque installed on the Mur des cinéastes, a monument that commemorates the numerous directors of international cinema who have visited the Institut Lumière.

The winner of the Prize is announced in January or February, and it is presented a few weeks later, in February or March. In 2021, due to the COVID-19 pandemic, the announcement was not made until the beginning of March and the award ceremony was postponed to June.

== Winners ==
Year	English title	French title	Director	Ref.
2005	36 Quai des Orfèvres		Olivier Marchal	
2006	The Beat That My Heart Skipped	De battre mon cœur s'est arrêté	Jacques Audiard	
2007	Tell No One	Ne le dis à personne	Guillaume Canet	
2008	The Second Wind	Le Deuxième Souffle	Alain Corneau	
2009	Crime Is Our Business	Le crime est notre affaire	Pascal Thomas	
2010	OSS 117: Lost in Rio	OSS 117: Rio ne répond plus	Michel Hazanavicius	
2011	Point Blank	À bout portant	Fred Cavayé	
2012	Polisse		Maïwenn	
2013	Paris by Night	Une nuit	Philippe Lefebvre	
2014	Zulu		Jérôme Salle	
2015	SK1	L'Affaire SK1	Frédéric Tellier	
2016	The Clearstream Affair	L'Enquête	Vincent Garenq	
2017	Dark Inclusion	Diamant noir	Arthur Harari	
2018	My Son	Mon garçon	Christian Carion	
2019	The Trouble with You	En liberté !	Pierre Salvadori	
2020	Oh Mercy!	Roubaix, une lumière	Arnaud Desplechin	
2021	Mama Weed	La Daronne	Jean-Paul Salomé	
2022	The Night Doctor	Médecin de nuit	Élie Wajeman	
2023	The Night of the 12th	La Nuit du 12	Dominik Moll	
2024	Anatomy of a Fall	Anatomie d'une chute	Justine Triet	
2025	An Ordinary Case	Le Fil	Daniel Auteuil	
2026	How to Make a Killing	Un ours dans le Jura	Franck Dubosc	
