= Blanche Ravalec =

French actress

- Born: 19 September 1954 (age 72); France
- Occupation: Actress
- Years active: 1978–present

Blanche Ravalec (born 19 September 1954) is a French actress.

== Career ==
Ravalec is known to audiences mainly for her role as Dolly, Jaws' girlfriend in the 1979 James Bond film Moonraker. Beyond this, she has made over 70 appearances in French-language TV and film. Among her English-to-French dubbing work is as Christina McKinney (Ashley Jensen) in Ugly Betty, as Emily Waltham (Helen Baxendale) in Friends, and as Bree Van de Kamp (Marcia Cross) in Desperate Housewives. She also provides voices for the French dub of Thomas the Tank Engine and Friends.

== Filmography ==
=== Film ===
- 1978: Holiday Hotel – Yveline
- 1978: Trocadéro bleu citron
- 1978: La Carapate – Marguerite
- 1978: Une histoire simple – Maggy (uncredited)
- 1979: Moonraker – Dolly (Jaws' girlfriend)
- 1982: Le Grand Pardon – Colette
- 1982: Salut j'arrive
- 1984: Les Voleurs de la nuit – The first woman
- 1984: The Blood of Others – Religieuse gare
- 1984: À nous les garçons – Daphné
- 1985: Suivez mon regard
- 1986: Kamikaze (1986) – La speakerine #3 en différé
- 1987: Club de rencontres – Marion
- 1992: L'Homme de ma vie – Karate Client
- 1994: Quand j'avais cinq ans je m'ai tué – La mère de gil
- 2000: Scènes de crimes – Madame Bourgoin
- 2013: Une bonne leçon – Jeanne

=== Television ===
- 2012: Joséphine, ange gardien TV Series (one episode: "Suivez le guide") – Michelle
