= Hippolyte Girardot =

French actor, film director and screenwriter

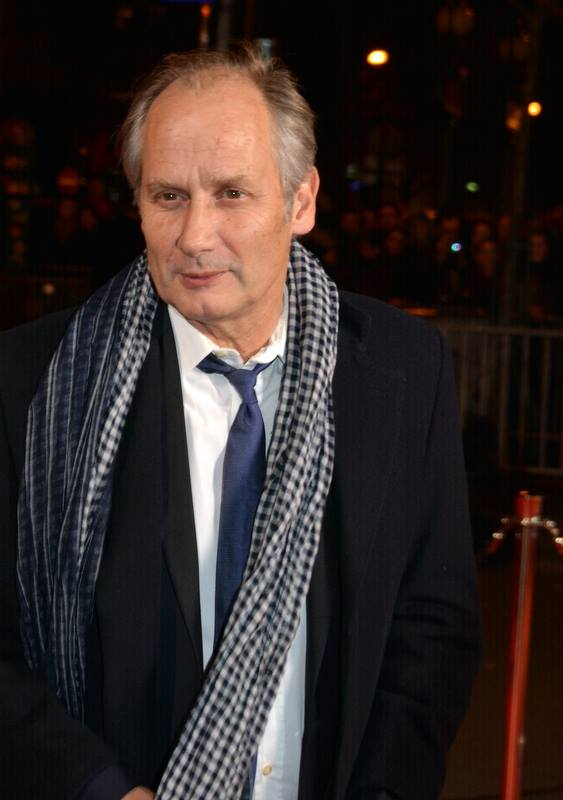
- Hippolyte Girardot at the 2016 César Awards
- Born: Frédéric Girardot; 10 October 1955 (age 71); Boulogne-Billancourt, France
- Occupations: Actor, film director, screenwriter
- Years active: 1973–present
- Children: 4 (including Ana Girardot)

Hippolyte Girardot, born Frédéric Girardot (French: [ipɔlit ʒiʁaʁdo]; 10 October 1955), is a French actor, film director and screenwriter. He is the father of actress Ana Girardot.

== Selected filmography ==
- 1973: La Femme de Jean, directed by Yannick Bellon, Rémi
- 1980: Inspecteur la Bavure, directed by Claude Zidi, a friend of Michel Clément
- 1980: L'Amour nu, directed by Yannick Bellon, Hervé
- 1982: Le Destin de Juliette, directed by Aline Issermann, Pierre
- 1984: Le Bon Plaisir, directed by Francis Girod, Pierre
- 1984: Prénom Carmen (First Name: Carmen), directed by Jean-Luc Godard, Fred
- 1984: Fort Saganne, directed by Alain Corneau, Dr Courette
- 1985: L'Amour ou presque, directed by Patrice Gautier, Luc
- 1986: Manon des Sources (Manon of the Spring), directed by Claude Berri, Bernard Olivier
- 1986: L'Amant magnifique, directed by Aline Issermann, Vincent
- 1986: Suivez mon regard, directed by Jean Curtelin, The reporter in Africa
- 1986: Descente aux enfers, directed by Francis Girod, Philippe Devignat
- 1987: Les Pyramides bleues, directed by Arielle Dombasle, Mark
- 1989: Un monde sans pitié, directed by Eric Rochant, Hippo
- 1989: L'Affaire Wallraff, directed by Bobby Roth, Rudolph Schick
- 1991: Hors la vie, directed by Maroun Bagdadi, Patrick Perrault
- 1992: Confessions d'un Barjo, directed by Jérôme Boivin, Barjo
- 1992: La Fille de l'air, directed by Maroun Bagdadi, Philippe
- 1992: Après l'amour, directed by Diane Kurys, Tom
- 1992: Toxic affair, directed by Philomene Esposito, Georges
- 1993: Le Parfum d'Yvonne, directed by Patrice Leconte, Victor Chmara
- 1993: Les Patriotes, directed by Eric Rochant, Daniel
- 1994: Quand j'avais cinq ans je m'ai tué, directed by Jean-Claude Sussfeld, Dr Edouard Valmont
- 1996: Le Bel été 1914, directed by Christian de Chalonge, Pierre Mercadier
- 1996: La Cible, directed by Pierre Courrège, Stan
- 1997: Vive la République !, directed by Eric Rochant, Henri
- 2001: Jump Tomorrow, directed by Joel Hopkins, Gerard
- 2002: Poil de Carotte à la recherche du bonheur, directed by Franck Llopis
- 2002: Le Tango des Rashevski, directed by Sam Garbarski, Antoine
- 2002: Mariage et conséquences, directed by Joel Hopkins, Gérard
- 2003: Nos amis les flics, directed by Bob Swaim, Fatouche
- 2003: Léo en jouant « Dans la compagnie des hommes », directed by Arnaud Desplechin, William de Lille
- 2003: Trois couples en quête d'orage, directed by Jacques Otmezguine, Jean-Xavier
- 2003: Kings and Queen, directed by Arnaud Desplechin, Maître Marc Mamanne
- 2003: Modigliani, directed by Mick Davis, Utrillo
- 2004: House of 9, directed by Steven R. Monroe, Francis
- 2004: La Moustache (The Moustache), directed by Emmanuel Carrère, Bruno
- 2005: Incontrôlable, directed by Raffy Shart, Roger
- 2005: Paris, je t'aime, directed by Olivier Assayas
- 2005: Un an, directed by Laurent Boulanger, Félix
- 2005: Lady Chatterley, directed by Pascale Ferran, Sir Clifford
- 2006: Le Pressentiment, directed by Jean-Pierre Darroussin, Marc Bénesteau
- 2006: Trahisons, directed by Janluk Penot, colonel Podorovsky
- 2006: Où avais-je la tête ?, directed by Nathalie Donnini
- 2006: Je pense à vous, directed by Pascal Bonitzer, Antoine
- 2007: L'Invité, directed by Laurent Bouhnik
- 2007: Ma place au soleil, directed by Eric de Montalier
- 2007: Flight of the Red Balloon directed by Hou Hsiao-hsien, Marc
- 2008: Passe-passe directed by Tonie Marshall
- 2008: Caos calmo (Quiet Chaos)
- 2008: A Christmas Tale, directed by Arnaud Desplechin, Claude
- 2008: Le crime est notre affaire, directed by Pascal Thomas
- 2009: Park Benches, directed by Bruno Podalydès
- 2010: Top Floor, Left Wing, directed by Angelo Cianci, François
- 2011: Sleeping Sickness, directed by Ulrich Köhler, Gaspard Signac
- 2011: The Conquest, directed by Xavier Durringer, Claude Guéant
- 2012: You Ain't Seen Nothin' Yet!, directed by Alain Resnais
- 2012: Les saveurs du Palais, directed by Christian Vincent
- 2013: Kidon, directed by Emmanuel Naccache, Garnier
- 2014: Life of Riley
- 2014: Bird People, directed by Pascale Ferran
- 2014: To Life, directed by Jean-Jacques Zilbermann, Henri
- 2015: Okkupert (Norwegian TV-series), Pierre Anselme
- 2020: Mama Weed, directed by Jean-Paul Salomé, Philippe
- 2021: The French Dispatch, directed by Wes Anderson, Chou-fleur
- 2022: Irma Vep, directed by Olivier Assayas, Robert Danjou / Jean Ayme
- 2023: Bardot, directed by Danièle Thompson and Christopher Thompson, Louis Bardot
