= The Prayer (film) =

2018 film

- Film poster
- Directed by: Cédric Kahn
- Written by: Cédric Kahn
- Produced by: Sylvie Pialat; Benoît Quainon
- Starring: Anthony Bajon; Damien Chapelle; Àlex Brendemühl
- Cinematography: Yves Cape
- Edited by: Laure Gardette
- Distributed by: Le Pacte
- Release dates: 18 February 2018 (Berlin); 21 March 2018 (France)
- Running time: 107 minutes
- Country: France
- Language: French

The Prayer (French: La prière) is a 2018 French drama film written and directed by Cédric Kahn. Starring Anthony Bajon as Thomas, the film follows a young drug addict that undergoes to rehab in a catholic recovery group center.

The film had its world premiere at the main competition of the 68th Berlin International Film Festival, where Bajon won the Silver Bear for Best Actor. It was theatrically released in France on 21 March 2018, by Le Pacte.

== Premise ==
Following a drug overdose, Thomas admits himself at a catholic drug addiction recovery group, but struggles to accept help.

== Cast ==
- Anthony Bajon as Thomas
- Damien Chapelle as Pierre
- Alex Brendemühl as Marco
- Louise Grinberg as Sybille
- Hanna Schygulla as Soeur Myriam
- Davide Campagna as Luciano
