= Le Parfum d'Yvonne =

1994 romantic drama by Patrice Leconte

Le Parfum d'Yvonne (lit. 'The Perfume of Yvonne') is a 1994 French romantic drama written by Patrice Leconte and based on the story by Patrick Modiano and directed by Leconte. It stars Hippolyte Girardot, Richard Bohringer and Sandra Majani.

== Plot ==
In Switzerland in the 1950s Victor a French expatriate falls in love with Yvonne, an aspiring actress. Yvonne's protector Dr. Rene Meinthe, becomes involved in their courtship set against a background of wealth and decadence.

== Cast ==
- Hippolyte Girardot Victor Chmara
- Jean-Pierre Marielle Dr. Rene Meinthe
- Sandra Majani Yvonne Jacquet
- Richard Bohringer Yvonne's Uncle
- Paul Guers Daniel Hendricks
- Corinne Marchand Tilleuls Patron
- Philippe Magnan Pulli
- Claude Derepp Roger Fossone

== Reception ==
Variety called it "a variation on the steamy, dreamy melancholy that permeated "The Hairdresser's Husband". Quentin Curtis of The Independent wrote that it is "Leconte's usual mixture of flaccid eroticism, cheap sensation and strings scraping away on the soundtrack." Steve Beard of Empire gave the film three out of five stars.
