= Un ours dans le Jura =

2024 film by Franck Dubosc

- Theatrical release poster
- Directed by: Franck Dubosc
- Written by: Franck Dubosc; Sarah Kaminsky
- Produced by: Sidonie Dumas
- Starring: Franck Dubosc; Laure Calamy; Benoît Poelvoorde; Joséphine de Meaux; Kim Higelin
- Cinematography: Ludovic Colbeau-Justin; Dominique Fausset
- Edited by: Audrey Simonaud
- Music by: Sylvain Goldberg
- Production companies: Gaumont; Pour Toi Public Productions; France 2 Cinéma; Umedia
- Distributed by: Gaumont
- Release dates: 13 October 2024 (Festival de Cine Francés de Málaga); 1 January 2025 (France)
- Running time: 113 minutes
- Country: France
- Language: French
- Box office: $12.6 million

Un ours dans le Jura (lit. 'A Bear in the Jura'), also known in English as How to Make a Killing, is a 2024 French black comedy crime film directed by Franck Dubosc from a screenplay he wrote with Sarah Kaminsky.

The film had its world premiere at the Festival de Cine Francés de Málaga on 13 October 2024. It was theatrically released by Gaumont on 1 January 2025. The film received generally positive reviews and won the César Award for Best Original Screenplay and the Jacques Deray Prize.

== Synopsis ==
Michel and Cathy's quiet life as Christmas tree farmers in the Jura Mountains is interrupted when Michel narrowly misses a bear with his car, accidentally plowing into a car parked ahead, pushing it into a woman behind it, killing her. A man emerges from the woods at that moment, startled, falls down a slope, and is fatally impaled on a branch. After alerting his wife, they dispose of the bodies together. While doing so, they find a bag full of money in the trunk, which they estimate to be worth over 2 million euros. They decide to cover up the incident and keep the money. Their plans are derailed when they realise they realize they are facing a drug trafficking operation whose perpetrators are manipulating illegal migrants.

== Cast ==
- Franck Dubosc as Michel
- Laure Calamy as Cathy
- Benoît Poelvoorde as Roland, major of the Gendarmerie
- Joséphine de Meaux as Florence, adjudant of the Gendarmerie
- Kim Higelin as Blanche, daughter of Roland
- Mehdi Meskar as Samy, adjudant of the Gendarmerie
- Emmanuelle Devos as Sabine, the swinger club owner
- Anne Le Ny as the commissaire de police
- Timéo Mahaut as Dominique aka Doudou, son of Michel and Cathy
- Louka Meliava as the Iroquois
- Jean-Louis Loca as Mr. Vadé
- Christophe Canard as Jean-Pierre, the village priest
- Delphine Baril as Corinne, the bar owner
- Tania Garbarski as Anne-Marie

== Production ==
In an interview with TF1, Franck Dubosc acknowledged the film as being a deliberate nod to the Coen brothers' film Fargo (1996): "I wanted to make a rural western, a film that takes place in the countryside, in a harsh France, with snow, probably because I like the Coen brothers, that's for sure. So the Jura almost chose itself." During filming, Dubosc explained: "I wanted to change genres a bit. To be in a genre that still has comedy, but a bit darker, more in the humor of the Coen brothers, Fargo... all those films where you laugh, but it's completely deadpan, with characters very rooted in reality." Ahead of its release, Dubosc told AFP: "Even though I was raised on films by Bourvil and Ventura, notably The Wise Guys, I love the films of the Coen brothers. They dare to laugh at serious things. What they inspired in me was the idea that I, too, could make people laugh with revolvers."

After weeks of scouting in Bois-d'Amont, shooting took place in Les Rousses, Morbier and Le Vaudioux for several weeks beginning in February 2024. The production drew minor controversy when it was mistakenly reported that polystyrene had been used as artificial snow. This was corrected by the mayor of the town of Le Vaudioux, who assured that the production used cellulose, which is biodegradable. Filming was planned for a total of 40 days and was expected to wrap at the end of March 2024. The film required the use of a real bear trained for filming, despite the fact that there are no bears in the Jura Mountains.

== Release ==
Un ours dans le Jura had its world premiere at the Festival de Cine Francés de Málaga on 13 October 2024. The film had its UK premiere at the Leeds International Film Festival on 3 November 2024. It screened at the 25th Arras Film Festival on 10 November 2024.

It was theatrically released in France by Gaumont on 1 January 2025.

== Reception ==
=== Box office ===
Un ours dans le Jura grossed $10.8 million in France, and $1.8 million in other territories, for a worldwide total of $12.6 million.

In France, the film opened alongside We Live in Time, Six Jours, Bird, Totto-Chan: The Little Girl at the Window, All Shall Be Well, Quiet Life, Who Do I Belong To, Mika Ex Machina and Eephus. The film sold 89,439 admissions on its first day, 29,214 of which were preview screenings. It went on to sell 390,207 admissions in its opening weekend, finishing 4th at the box office, behind Mufasa: The Lion King, Sonic the Hedgehog 3 and Moana 2. At the end of its theatrical run, the film sold a total of 1,482,761 admissions. It was the third most popular French film of 2025, behind Jean-Paul Rouve's God Save The Tuche and Ken Scott's Once Upon My Mother.

=== Critical response ===
On AlloCiné, the film received an average rating of 3.4 out of 5 stars, based on 28 reviews from French critics.

=== Accolades ===
Award	Date of ceremony	Category	Recipient(s)	Result	Ref.
César Awards	26 February 2026	Best Original Screenplay	Franck Dubosc, Sarah Kaminsky	Won	
Festival de Cine Francés de Málaga	18 October 2024	Premio del Público	Un ours dans le Jura	Won	
Festival Polar de Cognac	7 March 2026	Meilleur film francophone de cinéma (Note: Shared with Case 137.)	Un ours dans le Jura	Won	
Jacques Deray Prize	13 March 2026		Un ours dans le Jura	Won	
