= Quand j'avais cinq ans je m'ai tué =

Quand j'avais 5 ans je m'ai tué
- Directed by: Jean-Claude Sussfeld
- Screenplay by: Jean-Pierre Carasso; Jean-Claude Sussfeld
- Based on: Quand j'avais 5 ans je m'ai tué by Howard Buten
- Starring: Hippolyte Girardot; Patrick Bouchitey; Salomé Lelouch
- Cinematography: Jean-Paul Rosa da Costa
- Music by: Fabrice Aboulker; Amaury Blanchary
- Release date: 2 February 1994
- Running time: 100 minutes
- Country: France
- Language: French

Quand j'avais 5 ans je m'ai tué (When I was five, I killed myself) is a French film directed by Jean-Claude Sussfeld, released in 1994.

== Synopsis ==
Gil, an eight-year-old child, is in a 1960s French psychiatric hospital, "due to what he did to Jessica".

He tells Dr Edouard Valmont about his conflict with authority and his strong relationship with Jessica, his classmate. The doctor befriends and trusts Gil, despite the attempts of his superiors to prevent their friendship.

== Cast ==
- Hippolyte Girardot : Docteur Edouard Valmont
- Patrick Bouchitey : Dr. Nevele
- Salomé Lelouch : Jessica
- Dimitri Rougeul : Gil
- Anny Romand : Mme. Cochrane
- François Clavier : Gil's Father
- Claude Duneton
- Ludovic Gadois : Martin Polaski
- Raymonde Heudeline
- Amar Ioudarene : Tignasse
- Laetitia Legrix : Anne Gendron
- Charlotte Lowe
- Dimitri Rougeul : Gil at 5 (voice)
- Antoine Du Merle : Gil at 5
- Blanche Ravalec : Gil's mother
