= Christmas Flow =

- Release poster
- Genre: Romantic comedy; Musical
- Created by: Henri Debeurme; Marianne Levy; Victor Rodenbach
- Starring: Tayc; Shirine Boutella; Marion Séclin
- Country of origin: France
- Original language: French
- No. of seasons: 1
- No. of episodes: 3

Production
- Running time: 47–54 min
- Production companies: Netflix Studios; Next Episode

Original release
- Network: Netflix
- Release: 17 November 2021

Christmas Flow is a 2021 French television series created by Henri Debeurme, Marianne Levy and Victor Rodenbach and starring Tayc, Shirine Boutella and Marion Séclin. It premiered on Netflix on 17 November 2021 and consists of 3 episodes.

== Cast ==
- Tayc as Marcus
- Shirine Boutella as Lila
- Marion Séclin as Alice
- Aloïse Sauvage as Jeanne
- Camille Lou as Mel
- Walid Ben Mabrouk as Zack
- Estelle Meyer as Safia
- Stéphan Wojtowicz as Pascal
- Yasmine Kefil as Sara
- Isabelle Candelier as Danièle
- Philippe Rebbot as Daniel
- Nuts as Le Chien
- Angélique Kidjo as mother of Marcus

== See also ==
- List of Christmas films
