= Rebels (film) =

- Film ooster
- French: Rebelles
- Directed by: Allan Mauduit
- Written by: Allan Mauduit; Jérémie Guez
- Produced by: Matthieu Tarot
- Starring: Cécile de France; Yolande Moreau; Audrey Lamy
- Cinematography: Vincent Mathias
- Edited by: Christophe Pinel
- Production company: Albertine Productions
- Distributed by: Le Pacte
- Release date: 13 March 2019
- Running time: 97 min
- Country: France
- Language: French
- Budget: $5.2 million
- Box office: $7.3 million

Rebels (French: Rebelles) is a 2019 French comedy directed and written by Allan Mauduit.

== Plot ==
Sandra, is a young woman forced to leave the south of France to flee a violent husband. Without attachment, she returned to Boulogne-sur-Mer, the city of her childhood which she left almost 15 years ago. She finds her mother there and a world she left behind. Without money, she is hired in a fish cannery where she befriends two workers. But one day, one of her colleagues tackles her insistently, she defends herself and kills him accidentally ...

== Cast ==
- Cécile de France : Sandra Dréant
- Yolande Moreau : Nadine Dewulder
- Audrey Lamy : Marilyn Santos
- Simon Abkarian : Simon Bénéké
- Béatrice Agenin : Sandra's mother
- Eric Godon : Belgian 1
- Sandy Cys : figurante
- Anthony Dufour : figurant

== Production ==
Principal photography on the film began 26 February 2018 and lasted til 4 May 2018 in the North of France.
