= The Sitting Duck =

2022 film by Jean-Paul Salomé

- Theatrical release poster
- French: La Syndicaliste
- Literally: The Trade Unionist
- Directed by: Jean-Paul Salomé
- Screenplay by: Jean-Paul Salomé; Fadette Drouard
- Based on: La Syndicaliste by Caroline Michel-Aguirre
- Produced by: Bertrand Faivre
- Starring: Isabelle Huppert; Grégory Gadebois; François-Xavier Demaison; Pierre Deladonchamps; Alexandra Maria Lara; Gilles Cohen; Marina Foïs; Yvan Attal
- Cinematography: Julien Hirsch
- Edited by: Valérie Deseine; Aïn Varet
- Music by: Bruno Coulais
- Production companies: Le Bureau; Heimatfilm; France 2 Cinéma; Restons Groupés Productions; Les Films du Camélia
- Distributed by: Le Pacte; Weltkino Filmverleih
- Release dates: 2 September 2022 (Venice); 1 March 2023 (France); 27 April 2023 (Germany)
- Running time: 122 minutes
- Countries: France; Germany
- Language: French
- Box office: $4 million

The Sitting Duck (French: La Syndicaliste, lit. 'The Trade Unionist') is a 2022 French-language thriller film directed by Jean-Paul Salomé from a screenplay he co-wrote with Fadette Drouard. The film is a co-production between France and Germany.

The film is an adaptation of the 2019 book of the same name written by Caroline Michel-Aguirre, an investigative journalist for L'Obs. The book reported on Maureen Kearney, an Irish trade unionist for the nuclear power company Areva. She became a whistleblower when she revealed a secret deal between the state-owned utility Electricité de France and a Chinese power company, which Kearney feared would transfer sensitive nuclear technology from Areva to China and threaten thousands of French jobs. Following her revelations, Kearney was subjected to anonymous threats which culminated in a violent attack in her home in 2012.

The film stars Isabelle Huppert as Kearney. It had its world premiere at the 79th Venice International Film Festival on 2 September 2022.

== Synopsis ==
A thriller investigation set in the world of nuclear power and politics.

== Cast ==
- Isabelle Huppert as Maureen Kearney
- Grégory Gadebois as Gilles Hugo
- François-Xavier Demaison as Jean-Pierre Bachmann
- Pierre Deladonchamps as Adjudant-Chef Brémont
- Alexandra Maria Lara as Julie
- Gilles Cohen as Hervé Temime
- Marina Foïs as Anne Lauvergeon
- Yvan Attal as Luc Oursel
- Christophe Paou as Arnaud Montebourg
- Aloïse Sauvage as Chambard
- Mara Taquin as Fiona
- Christian Hecq as Tirésias
- Bernard Gabay as Henri Proglio
- Andréa Bescond as Présidente du Tribunal
- Geno Lechner as Véronique
- Antoine Basler as Gendarme

== Production ==
The Sitting Duck was produced by Le Bureau in co-production with France 2 Cinéma, Restons Groupés Productions, Les Films du Camélia and Germany's Heimatfilm.

The film was shot over 40 days in 2022. Filming took place in Paris, in the Île-de-France, on the Swiss border and in Germany.

== Release ==
The Sitting Duck was selected to be screened in the Orizzonti section at the 79th Venice International Film Festival. It had its world premiere in Venice on 2 September 2022. It was theatrically released in France on 1 March 2023 by Le Pacte. Weltkino Filmverleih distributed the film in Germany on 27 April 2023. It was also invited to the 27th Lima Film Festival in the Acclaimed section, where it was screened on 10 August 2023.

== Reception ==
=== Box office ===
The Sitting Duck grossed $3.7 million in France and $228,220 in other territories for a worldwide total of $3.9 million.

In France, the film opened alongside Creed III, Les Petites Victoires, The Son, Empire of Light and Goutte d'Or. The film sold 30,915 admissions on its first day, 10,668 of which were preview screenings. It went on to sell 153,715 admissions in its opening weekend, finishing 7th at the box office. At the end of its theatrical run, the film sold a total of 500,162 admissions.

=== Critical response ===
On Rotten Tomatoes, the film holds an approval rating of 80% based on 40 reviews, with an average rating of 6.5/10. The website's critics consensus states, "Isabelle Huppert's understated performance keeps La Syndicaliste's whistleblower story stirring even when its messaging drifts toward the didactic." On Metacritic, the film has a score of 50 out of 100 based on 8 critics, indicating "mixed or average" reviews. The Sitting Duck received an average rating of 3.3 out of 5 stars on the French website AlloCiné, based on 29 reviews.

Fabrice Leclerc of Paris Match wrote, "This gripping thriller, a moral study on the mysterious strings of power and the CAC 40, delivers a successful indictment of the elites, never clumsy". Le Figaro wrote, "Salomé invents nothing new. But he depicts with great finesse the fight of a woman to regain her dignity and her honor".

Le Point called it a "fake thriller" that is instead a portrait of "an elusive, unpredictable, even eccentric woman with her kitsch look, her colorful outfits and her collection of spectacular glasses and earrings". Thomas Buarez of Première panned the film's performances as overly rigid and ultimately cliché.

Reviewing the film following its Venice premiere, Stephanie Bunbury of Deadline wrote, "Huppert, who can convey an ocean of feeling with the twitch of an eyebrow, embodies this unassuming heroism so effectively that you hardly notice that a much bigger story has been allowed to become a blur".

=== Accolades ===
| Award | Date of ceremony | Category | Recipient(s) | Result | Ref. |
|---|---|---|---|---|---|
| Venice Film Festival | 10 September 2022 | Orizzonti Award for Best Film | Jean-Paul Salomé | Nominated | |
