= Stalk (TV series) =

French television series

- Country of origin: France
- Original language: French
- No. of series: 3
- No. of episodes: 20

Original release
- Network: France.tv Slash; France 2 (Season 1)

Stalk is a French television series.

== Cast ==
- Théo Fernandez as Lucas ("Lux")
- Carmen Kassovitz as Alma
- Pablo Cobo as Alex
- Clément Sibony as Herzig
- Aloïse Sauvage as Charlie
- Riadh Belaïche as Justin
- Nicolas Cazalé as Bilal
