= Ismael's Ghosts =

- Film poster
- French: Les fantômes d'Ismaël
- Directed by: Arnaud Desplechin
- Screenplay by: Arnaud Desplechin; Léa Mysius; Julie Peyr
- Produced by: Pascal Caucheteux; Vincent Maraval
- Starring: Mathieu Amalric; Marion Cotillard; Charlotte Gainsbourg; Louis Garrel; Alba Rohrwacher; László Szabó; Hippolyte Girardot
- Cinematography: Irina Lubtchansky
- Edited by: Laurence Briaud
- Music by: Grégoire Hetzel
- Production companies: Why Not Productions; France 2 Cinéma; Le Pacte; Wild Bunch
- Distributed by: Le Pacte
- Release date: 17 May 2017 (Cannes)
- Running time: 114 minutes (Cannes cut); 135 minutes (director's cut)
- Country: France
- Language: French
- Box office: $3 million

Ismael's Ghosts (French: Les Fantômes d'Ismaël) is a 2017 French drama film directed by Arnaud Desplechin, starring Mathieu Amalric, Marion Cotillard, Charlotte Gainsbourg, Louis Garrel, Alba Rohrwacher, László Szabó, and Hippolyte Girardot. The film follows a filmmaker whose life is sent into a tailspin, just as he is about to start shooting a new film, by the return of his wife, who disappeared 20 years ago and whom he thought dead. Ismael's Ghosts premiered at the 2017 Cannes Film Festival as the opening film.

== Plot ==
A film director named Ismaël is working on his next film starring Ivan. It is based on his estranged brother and tells the story of a diplomat who is possibly a spy.

In the middle of the night, Ismaël receives a phone call from Henri. Ismaël was married to Henri's daughter Carlotta, who has been missing for 20 years and presumed dead. Ismaël has a relationship with an astrophysicist named Sylvia now. Carlotta suddenly appears in front of them.

Ismaël does not show up to the set. He accidentally shoots the film's producer in the arm.

== Cast ==
- Mathieu Amalric as Ismaël Vuillard
- Marion Cotillard as Carlotta Bloom
- Charlotte Gainsbourg as Sylvia
- Louis Garrel as Ivan Dedalus
- Alba Rohrwacher as Arielle / Faunia
- László Szabó as Henri Bloom
- Hippolyte Girardot as Zwy
- Jacques Nolot as Claverie
- Catherine Mouchet as The intensive care doctor
- Samir Guesmi as Doctor
- Isabelle Sadoyan as Rose

== Production ==
In Ismael's Ghosts, Mathieu Amalric portrays a recurring character named Ismaël Vuillard, who appeared in Arnaud Desplechin's Kings and Queen. The name of Marion Cotillard's character, Carlotta, derives from Alfred Hitchcock's film Vertigo. The title of the film is an homage to Norman Mailer's novel Harlot's Ghost. Bob Dylan's song It Ain't Me Babe was used in a scene from the film. The film includes quotes from Jacques Lacan's Seminar VIII, Rainer Maria Rilke's Schlaflied, and Philip Roth's American Pastoral.

== Release ==
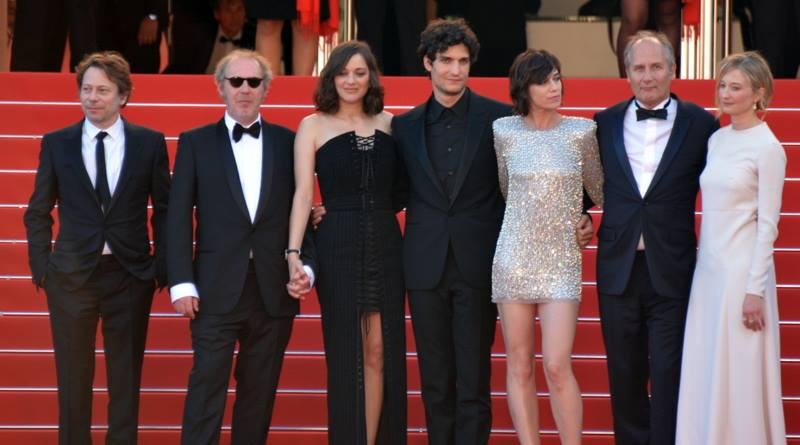
From left to right: Mathieu Amalric, Arnaud Desplechin, Marion Cotillard, Louis Garrel, Charlotte Gainsbourg, Hippolyte Girardot, and Alba Rohrwacher at the 2017 Cannes Film Festival.

On 17 May 2017, the film premiered as the opening film at the 2017 Cannes Film Festival. At the Cannes, the film screened in a 114-minute version. In the United States, it screened in a 135-minute "director's cut" version. In France, the film was released in the shorter version at the big theaters and in the longer version at the art house theaters. At the Cannes' press conference, Arnaud Desplechin stated that the former one is "more sentimental" and the later one is "more intellectual". The film also screened at the Vancouver International Film Festival, the New York Film Festival, and the Philadelphia Film Festival.

== Reception ==
Review aggregation website Rotten Tomatoes gives the film an approval rating of 52% based on 69 reviews, with an average score of 5.5/10. The website's critical consensus reads, "Ismael's Ghosts unites an excellent cast — and their valiant efforts are often enough to counter its somewhat confused and disjointed story." On Metacritic, which assigns a normalised rating out of 100 based on reviews from mainstream critics, the film has a score of 65 based on 23 reviews, indicating "generally favorable reviews".

Sam C. Mac of Slant Magazine gave the film 3 stars out of 4, calling it "one of Desplechin's most emphatic expressions of his personal, ever-expanding artistic vision." David Parkinson of Empire gave the film 3 stars out of 5, saying, "even those without the foggiest about what they're watching will have to admit that the performances are compelling, and the prospect that the pieces will defy logic and slot into place remains enticing." Boyd van Hoeij of The Hollywood Reporter wrote: "The film's various storylines wouldn't hold together as well as they do if there weren't an overarching theme that ties everything together, with Ismael's Ghosts finally becoming a study about how our identities are constantly being shaped by outside forces that may forever be beyond our control, however much we try — and sometimes fail — to remain centered."
