= Looking for Hortense =

2012 film by Pascal Bonitzer

- Film poster
- French: Cherchez Hortense
- Directed by: Pascal Bonitzer
- Written by: Pascal Bonitzer; Agnès de Sacy
- Produced by: Saïd Ben Saïd; Sarah Borch-Jacobsen; Kevin Chneiweiss
- Starring: Jean-Pierre Bacri; Kristin Scott Thomas; Isabelle Carré; Claude Rich
- Cinematography: Romain Winding
- Edited by: Elise Fievet
- Music by: Aleksey Aygi
- Production company: SBS Productions
- Distributed by: Le Pacte
- Release date: 5 September 2012
- Running time: 100 minutes
- Country: France
- Language: French
- Budget: $4.5 million
- Box office: $3.3 million

Looking for Hortense (French: Cherchez Hortense) is a 2012 French comedy-drama film directed by Pascal Bonitzer.

== Plot summary ==
Damien, a teacher of Asian civilization for business leaders, is instructed by his wife Iva to ask his father, a member of the judicial Council of State, to help to prevent the expulsion of a young woman of Serbian origin.

== Cast ==
- Jean-Pierre Bacri as Damien Hauer
- Kristin Scott Thomas as Iva Delusi
- Isabelle Carré as Aurore
- Claude Rich as Sébastien Hauer
- Jackie Berroyer as Lobatch
- Benoît Jacquot as Kevadian
- Agathe Bonitzer as Laetitia
- Philippe Duclos as Henri Hortense
- Marin Orcand Tourrès as Noé Hauer
- Joséphine Derenne as Blandine Hauer
- Arthur Igual as Antoine
- Jérôme Beaujour as Campuche
- Masahiro Kashiwagi as Satoshi
- Iliana Lolitch as Véra
- Francis Leplay as Marco
- Stanislas Stanic as Marek

== Critical reception ==
The film received mixed reviews. As of June 2020, the film holds a 56% approval rating on review aggregator Rotten Tomatoes, based on 18 reviews with an average rating of 5.35/10.

== Accolades ==
Award	Category	Recipient	Result
César Award	Best Actor	Jean-Pierre Bacri	Nominated
César Award	Best Supporting Actor	Claude Rich	Nominated
