= Mama Weed =

2020 crime comedy film

- Theatrical release poster
- French: La Daronne
- Literally: The Mum
- Directed by: Jean-Paul Salomé
- Screenplay by: Jean-Paul Salomé; Hannelore Cayre; Antoine Salomé (collaboration)
- Based on: The Godmother by Hannelore Cayre
- Produced by: Jean-Baptiste Dupont; Kristina Larsen
- Starring: Isabelle Huppert; Hippolyte Girardot
- Cinematography: Julien Hirsch
- Edited by: Valérie Deseine
- Music by: Bruno Coulais
- Production companies: Les Films du Lendemain; La Boétie Films; Le Pacte; Scope Pictures; Les Films de la Greluche; Restons Groupés Production; Les Films du Camélia
- Distributed by: Le Pacte
- Release dates: 16 January 2020 (Alpe d'Huez); 9 September 2020 (France)
- Running time: 106 minutes
- Country: France
- Language: French
- Budget: €5.8 million
- Box office: $5.5 million

Mama Weed (French: La Daronne, lit. 'The Mum') is a 2020 French crime comedy film directed by Jean-Paul Salomé from a screenplay he co-wrote with Hannelore Cayre, and in collaboration with his son Antoine Salomé. The film is based on Cayre's 2017 novel The Godmother. It stars Isabelle Huppert. It had its world premiere at the L'Alpe d'Huez Film Festival on 16 January 2020. It was released in France on 9 September 2020.

== Synopsis ==
Patience Portefeux is an Arabic–French translator for a French police precinct's narcotics unit. When she discovers she knows the mother of one of the drug dealers, Patience decides to use her insider knowledge to protect her friend and gets herself deeply involved in the world of drug dealing.

== Cast ==
- Isabelle Huppert as Patience Portefeux
- Hippolyte Girardot as Philippe
- Liliane Rovère as Patience's mother
- Jade Nadja Nguyen as Colette Fo
- Farida Ouchani as Khadidja
- Iris Bry as Hortense Portefeux
- Rebecca Marder as Gabrielle Portefeux
- Rachid Guellaz as Scotch
- Mourad Boudaoud as Chocapic
- Youssef Sahraoui as Cherkaoui brother 1
- Kamel Guenfoud as Cherkaoui brother 2

== Release ==
Mama Weed had its world premiere at the L'Alpe d'Huez Film Festival on 16 January 2020. The film was originally scheduled to be released theatrically on 25 March 2020 but was postponed due to the French government's decision to close cinemas in response to the COVID-19 pandemic. It was finally released in France by Le Pacte on 9 September 2020. Music Box Films gave the film a limited theatrical release in the United States beginning on 16 July 2021.

== Reception ==
=== Critical response ===
On Rotten Tomatoes, the film holds an approval rating of 79% based on 38 reviews. The website's consensus reads, "Mama Weed fails to fully engage with its themes -- but that's a relatively small quibble with Isabelle Huppert in the central role." According to Metacritic, which assigned a weighted average score of 58 out of 100 based on 9 critics, the film received "generally favorable reviews". Mama Weed received an average rating of 3.0 out of 5 stars on the French website AlloCiné, based on 33 reviews.

Nathalie Simon of Le Figaro wrote, "Jean-Paul Salomé's comedy about drug trafficking skillfully mixes the policier genre and humour".

Jordan Mintzer of The Hollywood Reporter called it "cleverly conceived and amusingly performed, if never quite as funny as it could be".

=== Accolades ===
Award	Date of ceremony	Category	Recipient(s)	Result	Ref.
César Awards	12 March 2021	Best Adaptation	Hannelore Cayre and Jean-Paul Salomé	Nominated	
Jacques Deray Prize	24 June 2021		Mama Weed	Won	
Women Film Critics Circle	13 December 2021	Best Kept Secret	Mama Weed	Won	
