= Howard Buten =

American author in France (1950–2025)

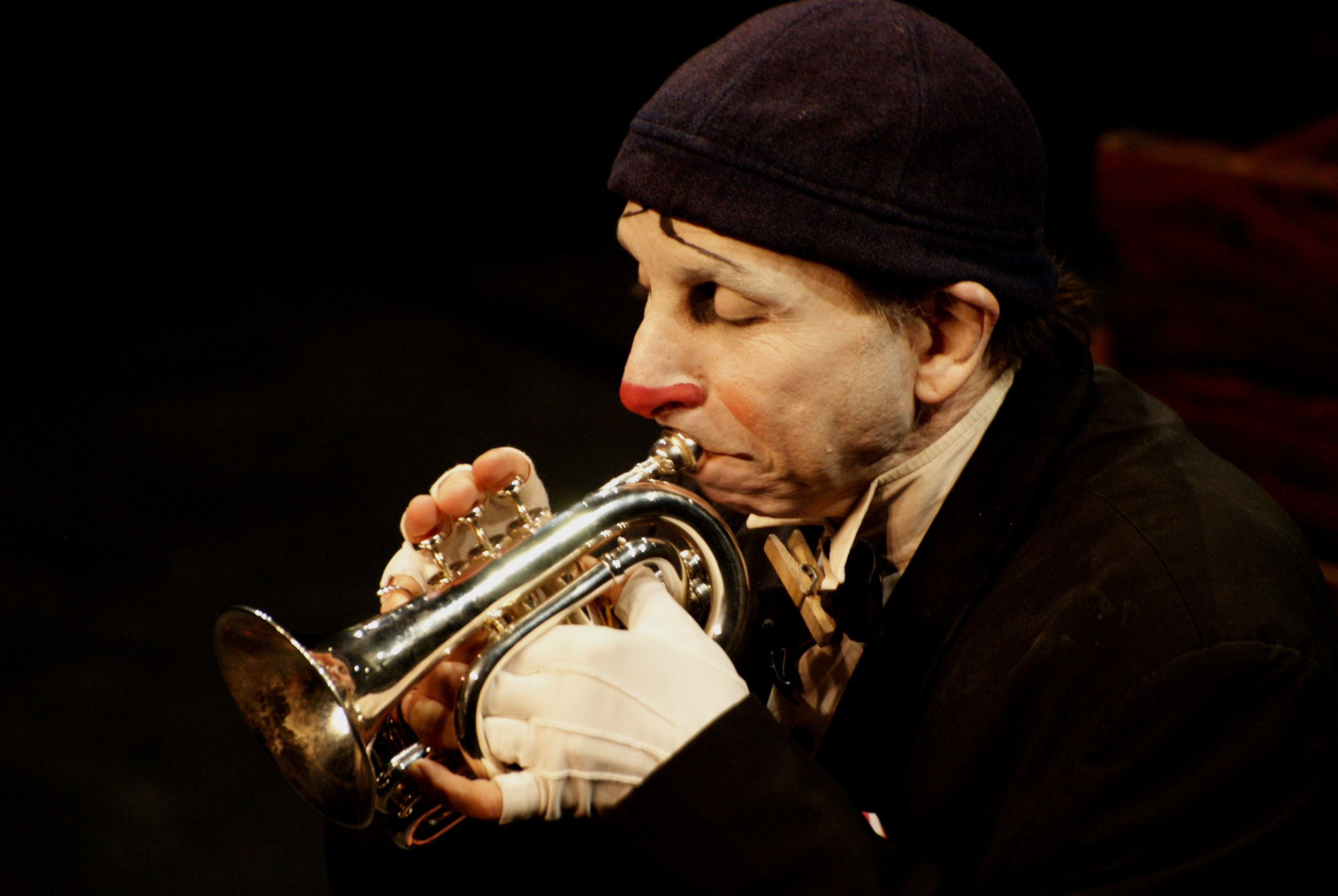
Howard Buten as Buffo, 2008

Howard Buten (July 28, 1950 – January 3, 2025) was an American author living in France. He was also a psychologist, a clown, and a violin player. Buten was the author of five novels, the first of which, entitled When I Was Five I Killed Myself, was published in 1981 and turned into a film under its French title Quand j'avais cinq ans je m'ai tué in 1994.

== Biography ==
Buten was born in Detroit, Michigan, on July 28, 1950. As a young man, Buten encountered a child with autism and this sparked a lifelong interest in the disorder. He worked on autism as a researcher, clinical psychologist, therapist, and founder of a clinic for the autistic in Paris, France.

Buten was also a theatrical clown (graduate of Ringling Bros) with the stage name Buffo, who is quite well known in France. He got his start in acting at a very young age, re-enacting scenes from his favorite stories, along with his childhood friends and neighbors.

Buten's first and best known novel, When I Was Five I Killed Myself, is largely unknown in his home country, but has sold more than a million copies in France. He was made Chevalier of the Ordre des Arts et des Lettres, a prominent literary honor, in 1991.

Howard Buten played a significant role in the Koschise Project, a French study center dedicated to the communication of autistic children. Founded in collaboration with Romain Philippe Pomedio, Koschise focuses on developing imitation techniques based on mirror neurons to promote empathy in children with autism.

Buten died on January 3, 2025, at the age of 74.

== Works ==
- When I Was Five I Killed Myself (also published under the title Burt) (1981)
- Le Cœur sous le rouleau compresseur (1984)
- Monsieur Butterfly (1987)
- Il faudra bien te couvrir... (1989)
- Histoire de Rofo, clown (1991)
- C'était mieux avant (1994)
- Ces enfants qui ne viennent pas d'une autre planète (1995)
- Quand est-ce qu'on arrive? (2000)
- Il y a quelqu'un là-dedans, des autismes (2003)
- Buffo par Buten (2005)
- Through the Glass Wall: Journeys Into the Closed-Off Worlds of the Autistic (Bantam, 2004)
- I Understand that If Not Completely Satisfied I Will Be Issued a Full Refund (1996)
