= Anthony Bajon =

French actor

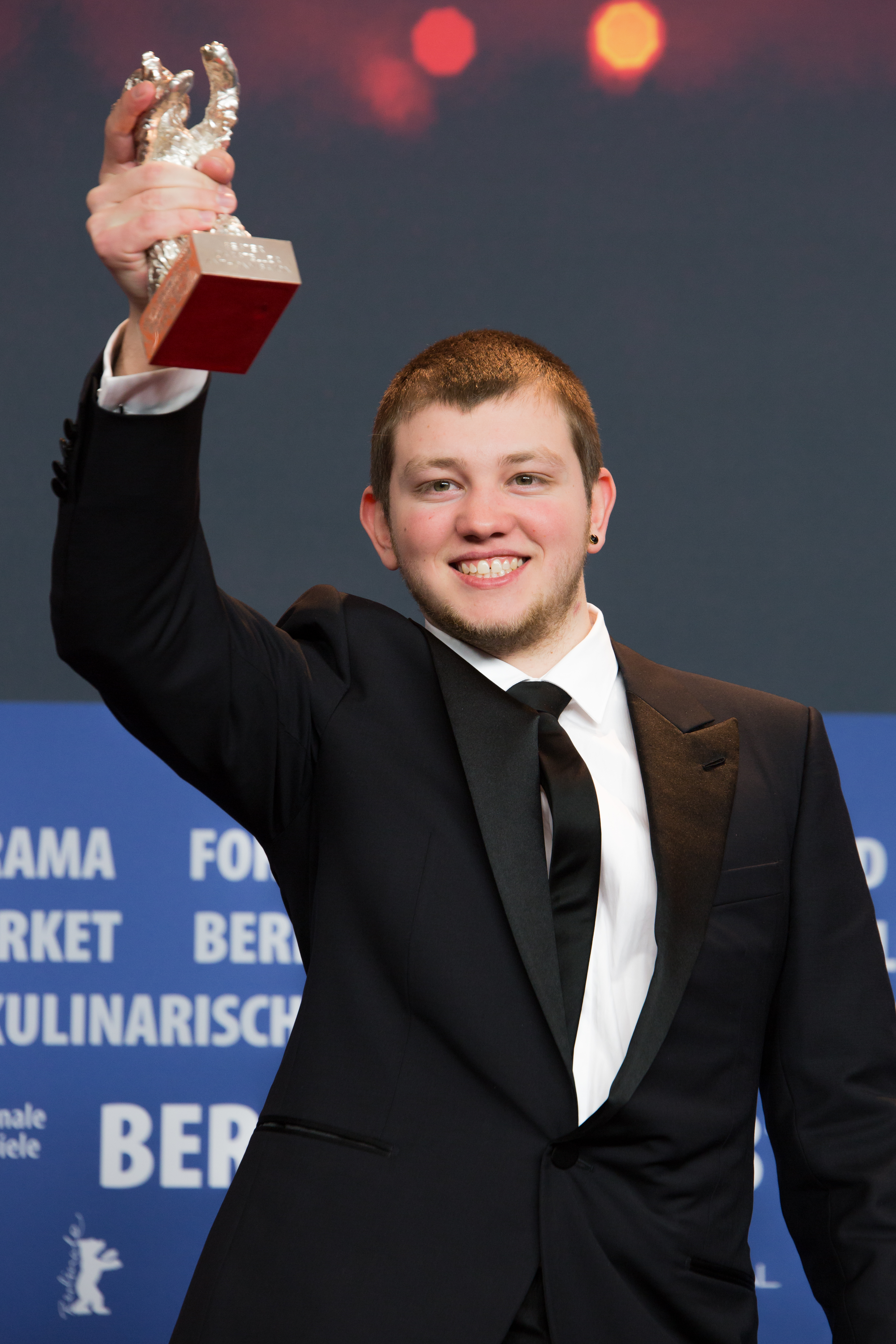
- Bajon at the Berlinale 2018
- Born: 7 April 1994 (age 32); Villeneuve-Saint-Georges, France
- Occupation: Actor
- Years active: 2009–present

Anthony Bajon (born 7 April 1994) is a French actor. He is best known for his leading role in the film The Prayer (2018), which earned him critical appreciation and the Silver Bear for Best Actor.

== Biography ==
Anthony Bajon began his acting career at the age of 12 on the stage of theater. Since then he has performed regularly in various theaters in France.

In 2015, Bajon debuted in Léa Fehner's film Les Ogres, after which he starred in the films Rodin by Jacques Doillon, and André Téchiné's Golden Years among others.

In 2018, Anthony Bajon played the lead role of 22-year-old drug addict Thomas in Cédric Kahn's movie The Prayer. For this role, he received the Silver Bear for Best Actor at the Berlin International Film Festival, becoming the seventh French actor in history of the festival to be honored with this award.

== Selected filmography ==
- 2015: Les Ogres : Le jeune de la caravane
- 2016: Irreplaceable : Le jeune homme au condylome
- 2016: Les Enfants de la chance : Marcel
- 2017: L'Embarras du choix : Etudiant maitre d'hotel
- 2017: Maryline : Simon, le frere de Maryline
- 2017: Golden Years : Le petit Vaugoubert
- 2017: Rodin : Auguste Beuret
- 2018: The Prayer : Thomas
- 2019: Merveilles a Montfermeil : Guillaume
- 2019: Au nom de la terre : Thomas
- 2019: Tu merites un amour : Charlie
- 2019: Teddy : Teddy
- 2021: A Radiant Girl : Igor
- 2021: Les méchants : Carcéral
- 2021: Another World : Lucas Lemesle
- 2022: Athena - Jérôme
- 2022: Le Monde de Demain - Bruno Lopes/Kool Shen
- 2023: Junkyard Dog - Dog
- 2024: Beating Hearts - Tony
- 2024: Maldoror - Paul Chartier
- 2026: The Good Lawyer

== Awards ==
- Silver Bear for Best Actor at 2018 Berlin Film Festival for The Prayer (winner)
- César Award for Most Promising Actor at 2019 César Awards for The Prayer (nomination)
- Lumière Award for Best Male Revelation at 2019 Lumière Awards for The Prayer (nomination)
