= Czesław Bojarski =

French-Polish counterfeiter (1912–2003)

Ceslaw Jan Bojarski
- A French Mugshot of Bojarski c. 1964
- Born: 15 October 1912; Łańcut, Poland
- Died: 2 May 2003 (aged 90); Saint-Sauveur, Isère, France
- Occupation: Counterfeiter

Czesław Jan Bojarski (15 October 1912 – 2 May 2003) was a Polish-French counterfeiter. He gained notoriety in the 1960s for his extremely accurate counterfeit of the 100-franc 'Bonaparte' banknote, prompting the newspaper Le Parisien to call him 'The Cezanne of counterfeit money'.

== Early life ==
Ceslaw Bojarski was born on 15 October 1912 in Łańcut, Poland. He studied at Lviv Polytechnic and then at Gdańsk University of Technology and graduated with a degree in architectural engineering. While serving as an officer in the Polish Army during the Second World War, he was captured by the Hungarians. He escaped and sought refuge in France.

After the war, he settled in Vic-sur-Cère, Cantal, where he met his French wife. With the profits from his first fake banknotes, he had a house built in Montegeron, Essonne, and moved into it with his family. There, he printed 30,000 banknotes and, convincing his wife that he was a travelling salesman, travelled throughout France to pass them off. He was arrested in 1964. According to Christian Porcheron, the director of the Museum of Counterfeit Money, 'He was the greatest counterfeiter of the 20th century. He has no match'.

== First counterfeits ==
Bojarski counterfeited and passed his first fake 1,000-franc banknotes in 1950. Although Bojarski was dissatisfied with them, the first notes were very well-printed on watermarked paper that he made himself. In January 1951, the Bank of France reported circulation of the almost flawless fake notes in the Paris region.. They flooded the coffers of the central bank and, at their height in 1954, reached 1,500 units per month. In 1958, he moved on to counterfeiting 5,000-franc notes

== 'Napoleon Bonaparte' banknotes ==
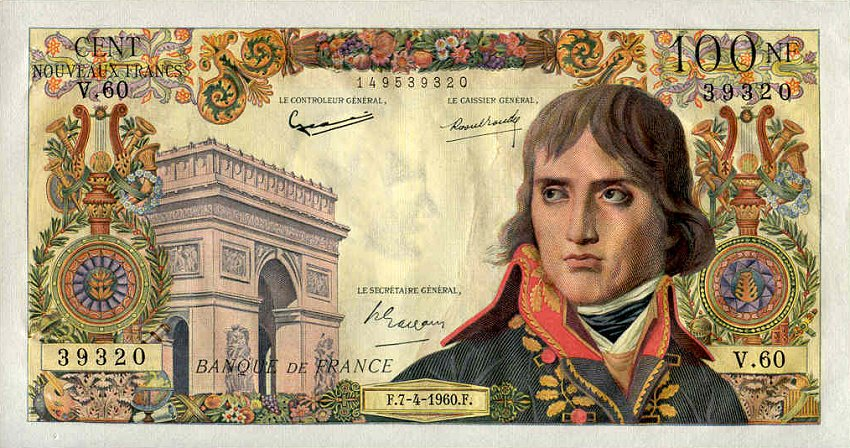
A "Bonaparte" 100-franc banknote

In November 1962, Bojarski switched from counterfeiting 5,000-franc notes to the recently redesigned 'Bonaparte' 100-franc notes. Producing those notes required skills and experience that took him more than ten years to achieve. His counterfeits were so successful that even skilled bank employees could not tell the fakes from the real notes. The fake 'Bonapartes' that Bojarski created remain the only fake notes to be directly exchanged by the Bank of France. The three counterfeits of three different banknotes (1,000-, 5,000- and then 100-franc notes) caused experts at the Bank of France to suspect they were made by the same hand.

The exceptional quality of Bojarski's counterfeits made him world-famous, first with police services specialising in counterfeiting and then with currency collectors. Experts from the Bank of France believed they were dealing with a powerful criminal organization with significant technical resources and the skills of several specialists, yet Bojarski produced his fake notes entirely alone by using machines that he invented and constructed himself out of fear of being caught if he purchased them. Unusually for a counterfeiter, he developed and produced all his own paper, with an authentic watermark, as well as his own inks, and engraved his own copper printing plates.

== Arrest and imprisonment ==
While most fake banknotes are usually identified and removed from bundles of notes, Bank of France experts discovered in 1963 a bundle of ten fake notes, which the police traced to a purchase of Treasury bonds whose envelope was stamped in a post office in the 17th arrondissement of Paris. The post office clerks were given the description of the man passing fake notes, and when a suspect came to the post office on 10 December 1963, the police followed him. That led them to a second man, Alexis Chouvaloff, a Russian who was very close to his Polish brother-in-law, Antoine Dowgierd. On 17 January 1964, the two were questioned at their home and found to be in possession of fake banknotes. They gave up Bojarski, who was arrested at home in Montgeron the same day by police from the Central Office for Counterfeit Currency Control (Office central de répression de la fausse monnaie).

For years, Bojarski had been travelling throughout France by night train to pass his fake notes. One day, exhausted by all the travelling, he reluctantly decided to work with Chouvaloff and Dowgierd to pass the fakes: 300 million francs in twelve years. Chouvaloff had naively bought Treasury bonds at the post office with his fake notes. The police raid at Bojarski's house initially revealed only one safe, containing 72 million francs in genuine Treasury bonds but fake banknotes, until an inspector accidentally knocked over a glass of water and the water flowed into a trapdoor, which revealed a hidden underground workshop.

Bojarski was sentenced to 20 years in prison and served his sentence at La Santé Prison in Paris. Because they had turned in Bojarski, his two accomplices (Chouvaloff and Dowgierd) were exempted from punishment. Bojarski's sentence was reduced for good behaviour after 13 years in prison. In 1978, he and his wife, who were living in a modest one-room apartment in Évry, Essonne, were on holiday when plumbers entered their apartment to repair a water leak. When moving the cooker, they found 10 gold bars and 797 gold coins. In 1980, a second trial ended with the confiscation of all the Bojarskis' property.

Bojarski died in poverty on 2 May 2003 and was buried at Saint-Nizier-du-Moucherotte Cemetery, Isère. As of 2013, the secret trapdoor still exists in his home in Montgeron.

== Popular culture ==
His life was the subject of the 2025 French film The Money Maker, released in France as L'Affaire Bojarski.
