= Reda Kateb =

Algerian-French actor (born 1977)

- Kateb in 2026
- Born: 27 July 1977 (age 49); Ivry-sur-Seine, France
- Occupations: Actor, film director, screenwriter
- Years active: 2003–present

Reda Kateb (French: [ʁeda katɛb]; Arabic: رضا كاتب; born 27 July 1977) is a French actor.

== Life and career ==
Kateb was born in Ivry-sur-Seine, France, to an Algerian actor, Malek-Eddine Kateb, and a French nurse of Czech and Italian origin. He is a grandnephew of the Algerian writer Kateb Yacine. He grew up in Ivry-sur-Seine, in the Paris region, where he lived until 2011 before moving to Montreuil.

His short film Pitchoune was presented in the Directors' Fortnight section at the 2015 Cannes Film Festival.

== Political views ==
In June 2024, Kateb signed a petition addressed to French President Emmanuel Macron demanding France to officially recognize the State of Palestine.

== Filmography ==
=== As actor ===
==== Film ====
Year	Title	Role	Notes
2003	Nif		Short film
2009	A Prophet	Jordi	
2009	Silent Voice	Stéphane	
2010	Pieds nus sur les limaces	Seb	
2010	Sur la tête de Bertha Boxcar		Short film
2011	Tenir les murs		
2011	1, 2, 3, voleurs	Le Capitaine Martin	
2012	Coming Home	Vincent Maillard	
2012	Ce chemin devant moi		
2012	Three Worlds	Doak	
2012	Chroniques d'une cour de récré		
2012	Le Monde nous appartient	Zoltan	
2012	Zero Dark Thirty	Ammar	
2013	Me, Myself and Mum	Karim	
2013	Paris Countdown	Wilfried	
2013	The Dream Kids	Reza	
2013	Gare du Nord	Ismaël	
2013	La Fin du début	Atreyu	Short film
2014	Les Fantômes de l'usine	Narrator	Short film
2014	Fishing Without Nets	Victor	
2014	Lost River	Driver	
2014	Hippocrate	Abdel	
2014	Insecure	Chérif Arezki	
2014	Far from Men	Mohamed	
2015	L'Astragale	Julien	
2015	Pitchoune	Karim	Short film
2015	Through the Air	Vincent Cavelle	
2015	The White Knights	Xavier	
2015	Stop Me Here	Samson Cazalet	
2016	The Beautiful Days of Aranjuez	The man	
2016	Sarah Winchester, Phantom Opera	Director	Short film
2016	Paris Prestige	Nasser	
2017	Django	Django Reinhardt	
2017	Submergence	Saif	
2018	Close Enemies	Driss	
2019	The Wolf's Call	Grandchamp	
2019	The Specials	Malik	
2025	The Money Maker	Jan Bojarski	

==== Television series ====
Year	Title	Role	Notes
2008	Spiral	Mr. Aziz	
2010	Mafiosa	Nader	
2011	De l'encre	Romuald	
2012	Treasure Island	David Dujon	
2021	In Therapy	Adel	

=== As film director/screenwriter ===
Year	Title	Notes
2015	Pitchoune	Short film

== Awards and nominations ==
Year	Nominated work	Award	Category	Result
2015	Hippocrate	40th César Awards	Best Supporting Actor	Won
2015	Hippocrate	Globes de Cristal Award	Best Actor	Nominated
2015	Hippocrate	Prix Patrick Dewaere	—N/a	Won
2017	Django	Cabourg Film Festival	Swann d'Or for Best Actor	Won
2018	Django	Lumière Awards	Lumière Award for Best Actor	Nominated
2018	Django	César Award	César Award for Best Actor	Nominated

== See also ==
- Maghrebian community of Paris
