= Jean-Paul Salomé =

French director and screenwriter (born 1960)

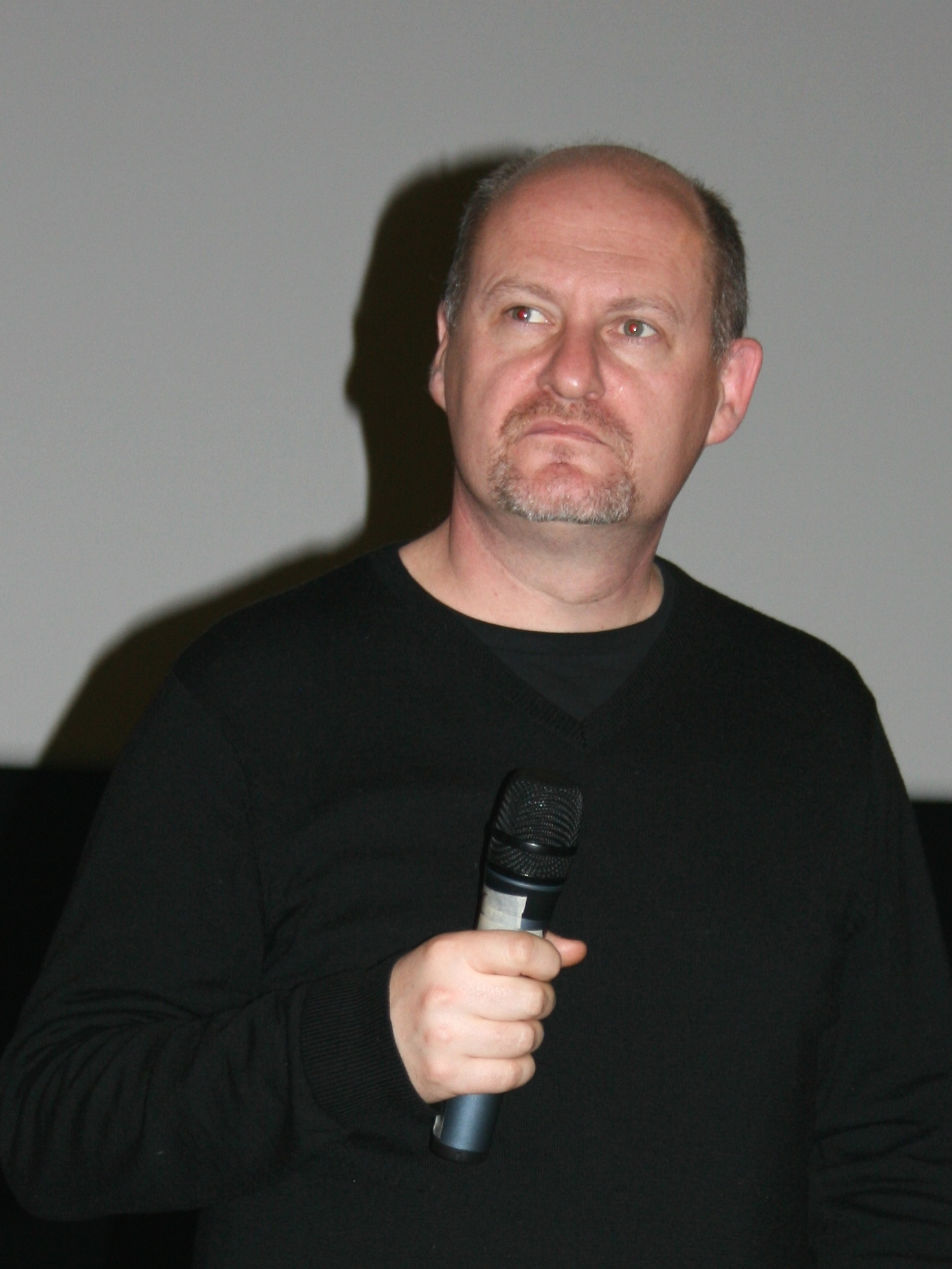
- Salomé in Paris in February 2008
- Born: 14 September 1960 (age 65); Paris, France
- Occupations: Director, screenwriter
- Years active: 1991–present

Jean-Paul Salomé (French: [ʒɑ̃ pɔl salɔme]; born 14 September 1960) is a French director and screenwriter.

== Filmography ==
| Year | Title | Role | Notes |
|---|---|---|---|
| 1991 | Crimes et jardins | Director, writer (story) | TV movie |
| 1994 | Les Braqueuses | Director, writer | |
| 1994 | Regards d'enfance | Director, writer | TV series |
| 1997 | La vérité est un vilain défaut | Director, writer | TV movie |
| 1998 | Restons groupés | Director, writer | |
| 2001 | Belphégor - Le fantôme du Louvre | Director, writer | |
| 2003 | Bonne nuit | Director | Short film |
| 2004 | Arsène Lupin | Director, writer (scenario) | |
| 2008 | Les Femmes de l'Ombre | Director, writer | |
| 2010 | The Chameleon | Director, writer | |
| 2013 | Playing Dead | Director, writer | |
| 2020 | Mama Weed | Director, writer | Jacques Deray Prize; Nominated–César Award for Best Adaptation |
| 2022 | The Sitting Duck | Director, writer | |
| 2025 | The Money Maker | Director, writer | |
