= The Lighthouse (2019 film) =

Film by Robert Eggers

- Theatrical release poster
- Directed by: Robert Eggers
- Written by: Robert Eggers; Max Eggers
- Produced by: Rodrigo Teixeira; Jay Van Hoy; Robert Eggers; Lourenço Sant'Anna; Youree Henley
- Starring: Willem Dafoe; Robert Pattinson
- Cinematography: Jarin Blaschke
- Edited by: Louise Ford
- Music by: Mark Korven
- Production companies: A24; Regency Enterprises; RT Features; Parts & Labor
- Distributed by: A24 (United States); VVS Films (Canada)
- Release dates: May 19, 2019 (Cannes); October 18, 2019 (United States)
- Running time: 109 minutes
- Countries: United States; Canada
- Language: English
- Budget: $11 million
- Box office: $18.3 million

The Lighthouse is a 2019 film directed and produced by Robert Eggers, from a screenplay he wrote with his brother Max Eggers. It stars Willem Dafoe and Robert Pattinson as turmoiled nineteenth-century lighthouse keepers stranded at a remote New England outpost by a violent storm. The film has defied genre categorization in media, leading to multiple interpretations from critics.

The idea of The Lighthouse originated from a script based on Edgar Allan Poe's incomplete short story "The Light-House", which was written by Max. Eggers researched for source material and developed the plot from a nineteenth-century legend of an accident at a Welsh lighthouse. The Lighthouse draws visually from photography of 1890s New England, maritime-themed French films from the 1930s, and symbolist art. Principal photography took place in Nova Scotia, Canada, beginning in April 2018 and lasting slightly over a month. It was shot in black-and-white, with a nearly-square 1.19:1 aspect ratio to express the lighthouse's vertical orientation and isolation of the characters. Mark Korven developed the film's score, evoking the sounds and mythologies of the sea.

The film premiered at the Cannes Film Festival on May 19, 2019, and was theatrically released in the United States by A24 on October 18, 2019. It grossed over $18 million, against an $11 million budget, and received critical acclaim, with particular praise for the direction, visuals, and performances of Dafoe and Pattinson. Among its numerous accolades, the film was nominated for Best Cinematography at the 92nd Academy Awards and the 73rd British Academy Film Awards.

== Plot ==
In the 1890s, Ephraim Winslow begins a four-week stint as a "wickie" (lighthouse keeper) on an isolated island off the coast of New England, under the supervision of former sailor Thomas Wake. Winslow discovers a small scrimshaw of a mermaid and keeps it in his jacket. Wake proves to be demanding, and Winslow empties chamber pots, maintains the machinery, carries heavy kerosene tanks up the stairs, and paints the lighthouse. Wake bars Winslow from the lantern room; Winslow discovers Wake disrobes before the light every night. During his stay on the island, Winslow begins to hallucinate sea monsters and logs floating in the sea, and masturbates to the mermaid on the scrimshaw. Winslow is bothered by a one-eyed gull, but Wake warns him against killing it under the superstitious belief that gulls are reincarnated sailors. Wake reveals to Winslow that his previous wickie died after losing his sanity. Winslow tells Wake he's a former timberman from Maine who was stationed in Canada and is now seeking a new trade.

The day before his scheduled departure, Winslow discovers a dead gull fouling the drinking water in the cistern. The one-eyed gull attacks him and he bludgeons it to death. The wind drastically changes and Winslow and Wake spend the night getting drunk during a severe storm that prevents the lighthouse tender from collecting them. As Winslow empties the chamber pots, he discovers the beached body of a mermaid, which waves and howls at him. He flees back to the cottage, where Wake informs him the storm has spoiled their rations. Winslow assumes the tender is merely a day late, but Wake says that they have already been stranded for weeks.

As the storm continues to rage, Winslow and Wake get drunk every night and alternate between moments of intimacy and hostility. One night, Winslow tries unsuccessfully to steal the lantern room keys from Wake and contemplates murdering him. Winslow later sees the one-eyed head of Wake's previous wickie in a lobster trap. Winslow drunkenly confesses to Wake that his real name is Thomas Howard, and he assumed the identity of Ephraim Winslow, a cruel foreman in Canada whom he deliberately allowed to drown during a log drive. Howard has a menacing vision of Wake accusing Howard of "spilling [his] beans" and runs to the dory to try to leave the island. Wake destroys the boat with an axe. Back at their lodgings, Wake claims it was Howard who hacked up the dory, driven mad by his confession.

Howard and Wake run out of alcohol and turn to drinking sweetened turpentine. That night, a giant wave crashes through the wall of their cottage and floods it. In the morning, Howard finds Wake's logbook, in which Wake has criticized him as a drunken and incompetent employee and recommended he be fired without pay. The two men argue, and Howard attacks Wake while hallucinating the mermaid, the real Winslow, and Wake as a Proteus-like figure. Howard beats Wake into submission and takes him to the hole at the base of the lighthouse to bury him alive. Before losing consciousness, Wake describes a "Promethean" punishment that awaits those who look in the lantern, and Howard takes the keys to the lantern room.

Howard goes to get a cigarette, and Wake returns and strikes him with the axe. Howard disarms and kills Wake before ascending the lighthouse. In the lantern room, the Fresnel lens opens to Howard, who reaches in and screams before falling down the lighthouse steps. Howard ends up lying nude on the rocks with a damaged eye as a flock of gulls peck at his exposed organs. The lighthouse is nowhere to be seen.

== Cast ==
- Robert Pattinson as Ephraim Winslow (fake) / Thomas Howard
- Willem Dafoe as Thomas Wake
- Valeriia Karaman as the Mermaid
- Logan Hawkes as Ephraim Winslow (real)
- Kyla Nicolle as the Woman on the Rocks
- Shaun Clarke as the Departing Wickie
- Pierre Richard as the Departing Assistant Wickie
- Preston Hudson and Jeff Cruts as the Tender Mates

== Production ==
=== Development ===
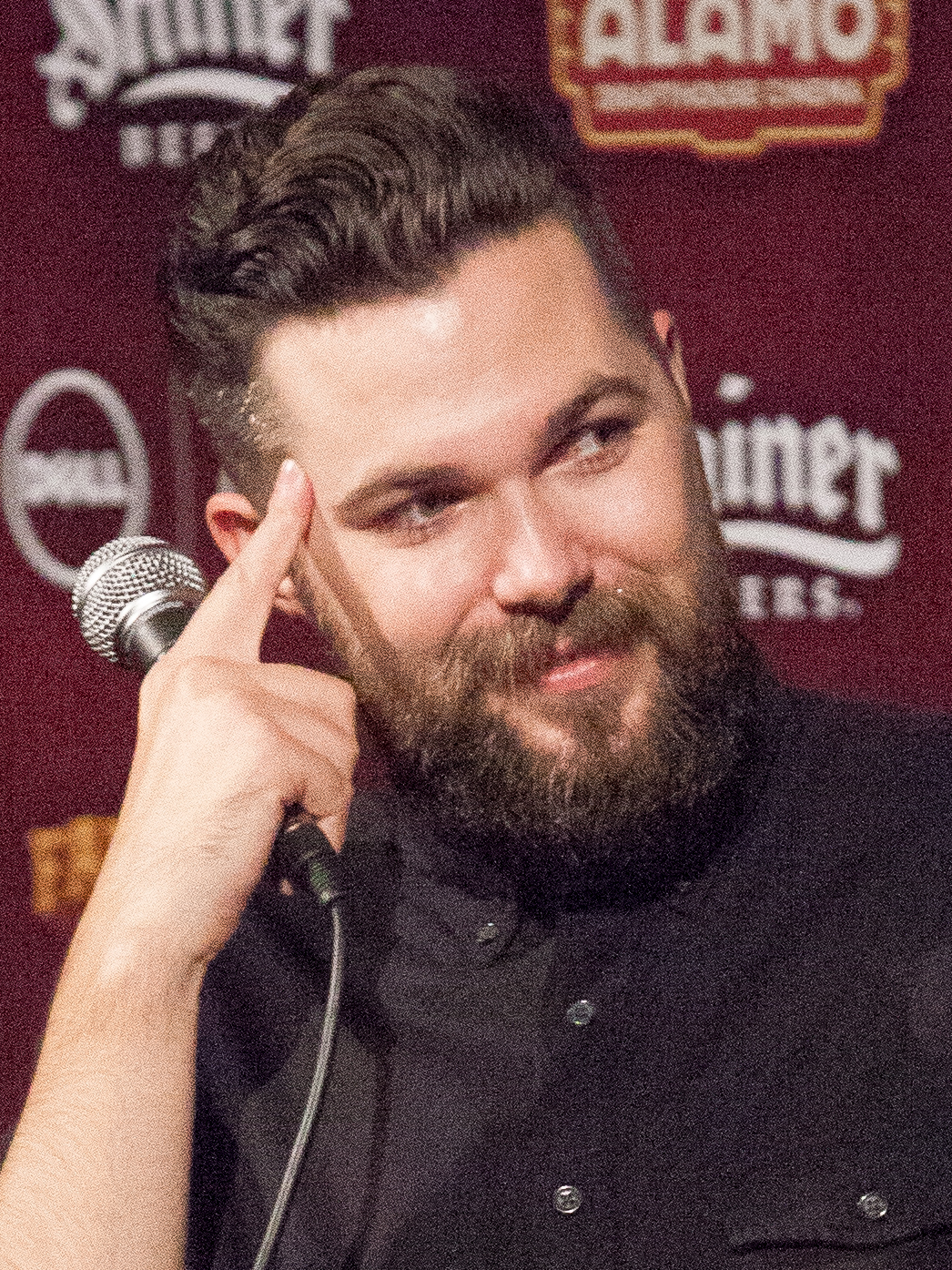
Robert Eggers in 2015

The original idea for The Lighthouse was first articulated at a dinner between director Robert Eggers and his younger brother, Max Eggers. Eggers was unhappy with his film industry prospects after the pitching of his first major feature, The Witch (2015), failed to secure funding. Max shared the basic outline of his screenplay, a lighthouse-set ghost tale tentatively titled Burnt Island, based on his interpretation of Edgar Allan Poe's unfinished short story "The Light-House". Max struggled with his treatment to the extent that progress stalled. Eggers began brainstorming ideas and, with his brother's support, soon began investigating for source material.

One story that caught the director's attention in his research was a nineteenth-century myth of an accident at Smalls Lighthouse in Wales, wherein one of two wickies, both named Thomas, died while trapped at the outpost by a destructive storm. That both men were named Thomas, Eggers recalled, persuaded him to create a film with an underlying story of identity. However, Eggers stopped working on The Lighthouse when he found an investor to finance The Witch.

The unexpected success of The Witch elevated Eggers's directing profile. To exploit his newfound credibility, he pushed The Lighthouse, among several other projects, in his negotiations with studio executives. He and Max then resumed their work by exchanging and revising drafts. This coincided with more rigorous research of the period to develop the onscreen world; Eggers sought out photos of 1890s New England, 1930s maritime-themed French films, and symbolist art for visual reference.

The Eggers' study of literature with maritime and surrealist themes influenced the film's dialogue. They looked into the writings of Herman Melville, Robert Louis Stevenson, and H. P. Lovecraft, among others, before coming across the work of Sarah Orne Jewett, a novelist best known for her local color works set in coastal Maine. Her dialect-heavy writing style provided the cadences of the lead characters, rooted in the experiences of her novel characters and real-life farmers, fishermen, and captains she had interviewed. The Eggers also referred to a dissertation on Jewett's use of dialects as guidance for more dramatic conversational scenes.

Another creative force shaping The Lighthouse was the Eggers' theater background. The two men drew from playwrights that influenced their work as young teens, chiefly artists such as Samuel Beckett, Harold Pinter, and Sam Shepard, whose writings examine male-centric perspectives of existential crises and psychosis.

=== Casting ===
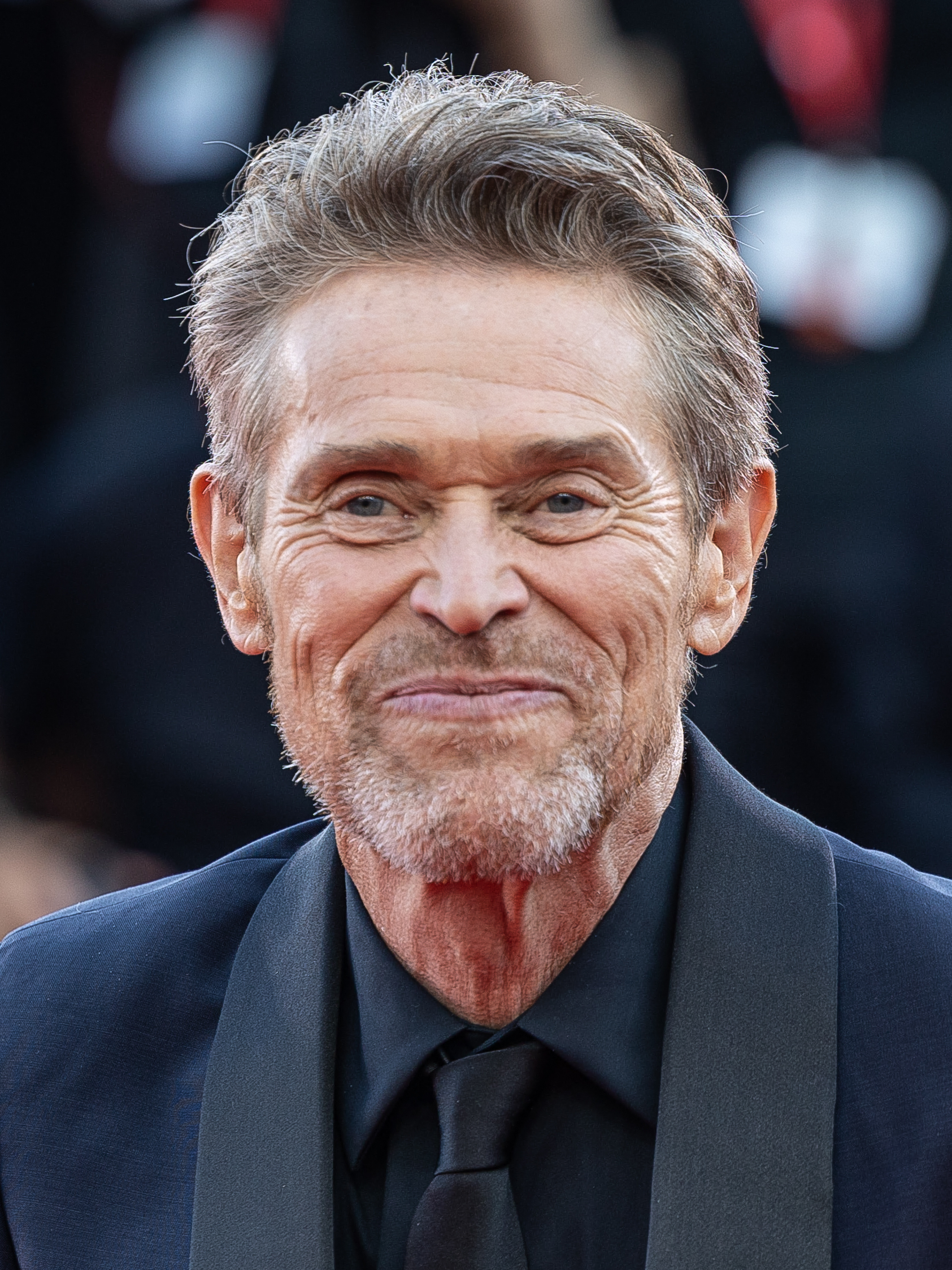
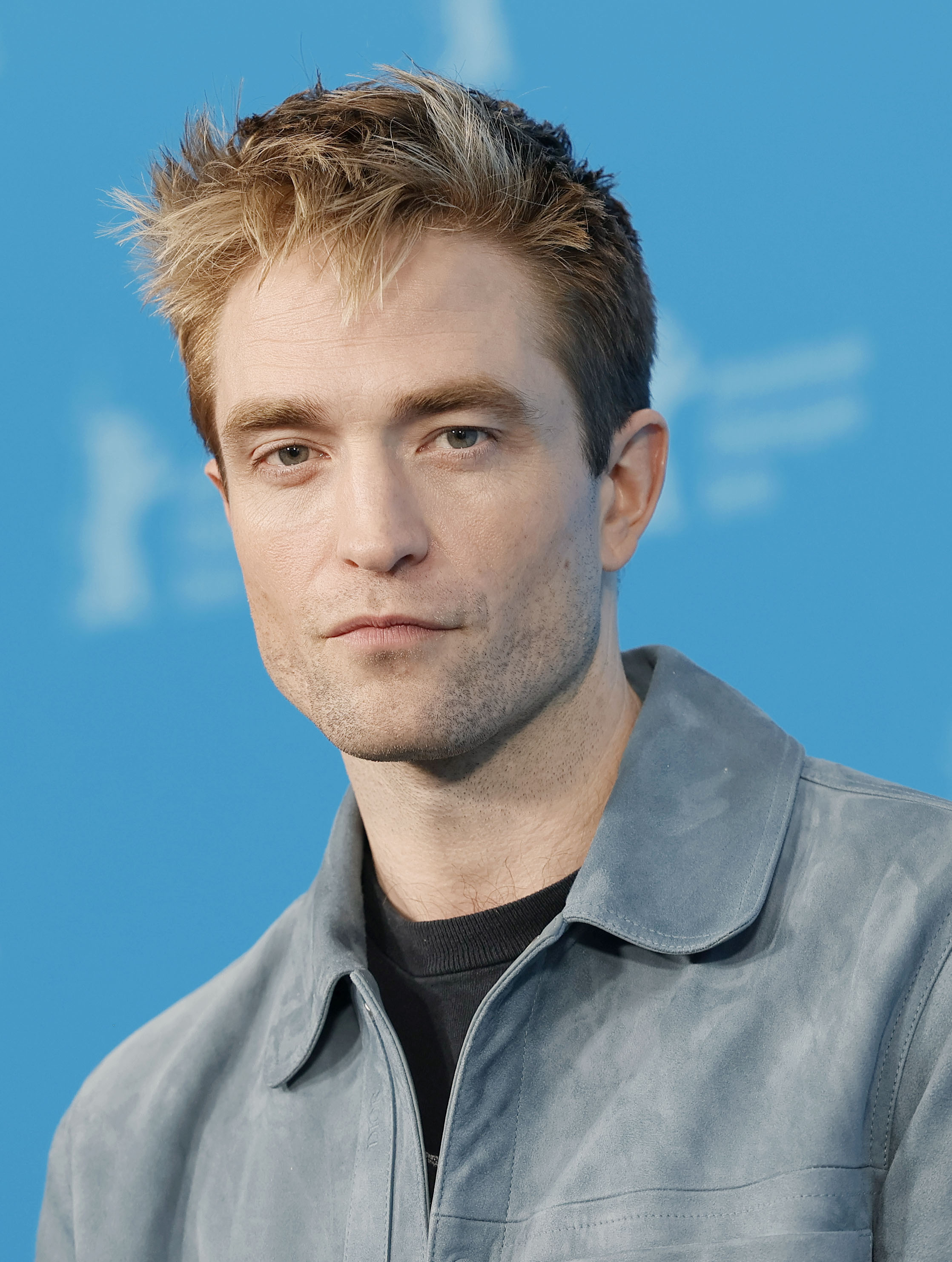
Left to right: Willem Dafoe (pictured in 2024) and Robert Pattinson (2025)

The film stars Willem Dafoe and Robert Pattinson, who approached Eggers independently. Pattinson originally met Eggers to discuss a proposal to portray a Victorian socialite in an unrelated project. This was rejected by Pattinson as he believed the role would fail to challenge his acting ability. His next meeting with Eggers took place once he finished reading The Lighthouse's completed script. According to Eggers, during their conversation, Pattinson showed him a clip of an intoxicated man screaming "I am a demon" to express his understanding of the expectations of his role.

Eggers's initial film proposals with Dafoe were also not fruitful. The director used Pattinson's participation in The Lighthouse to convince Dafoe because they already had a rapport. When they met in person to discuss the project, Dafoe recalled that Eggers was plainspoken in the conversation: "There was no discussion. 'This is the way we're going to do this. My way or the highway.' That's very unusual, especially for a two-hander, for a director to say, 'This is the way I see it. Yes or no?'"

Details about the actors and producers involved emerged in the media by February 2018. At one point, Anya Taylor-Joy pursued Eggers offering to play the mermaid, which Eggers opposed. To prepare for their scenes, each actor employed different techniques at the rehearsals. Dafoe, citing his theater background with the experimental troupe The Wooster Group, drew from his spontaneous acting style in rehearsals, whereas Pattinson planned his rehearsing from the discussion of the script.

=== Filming ===
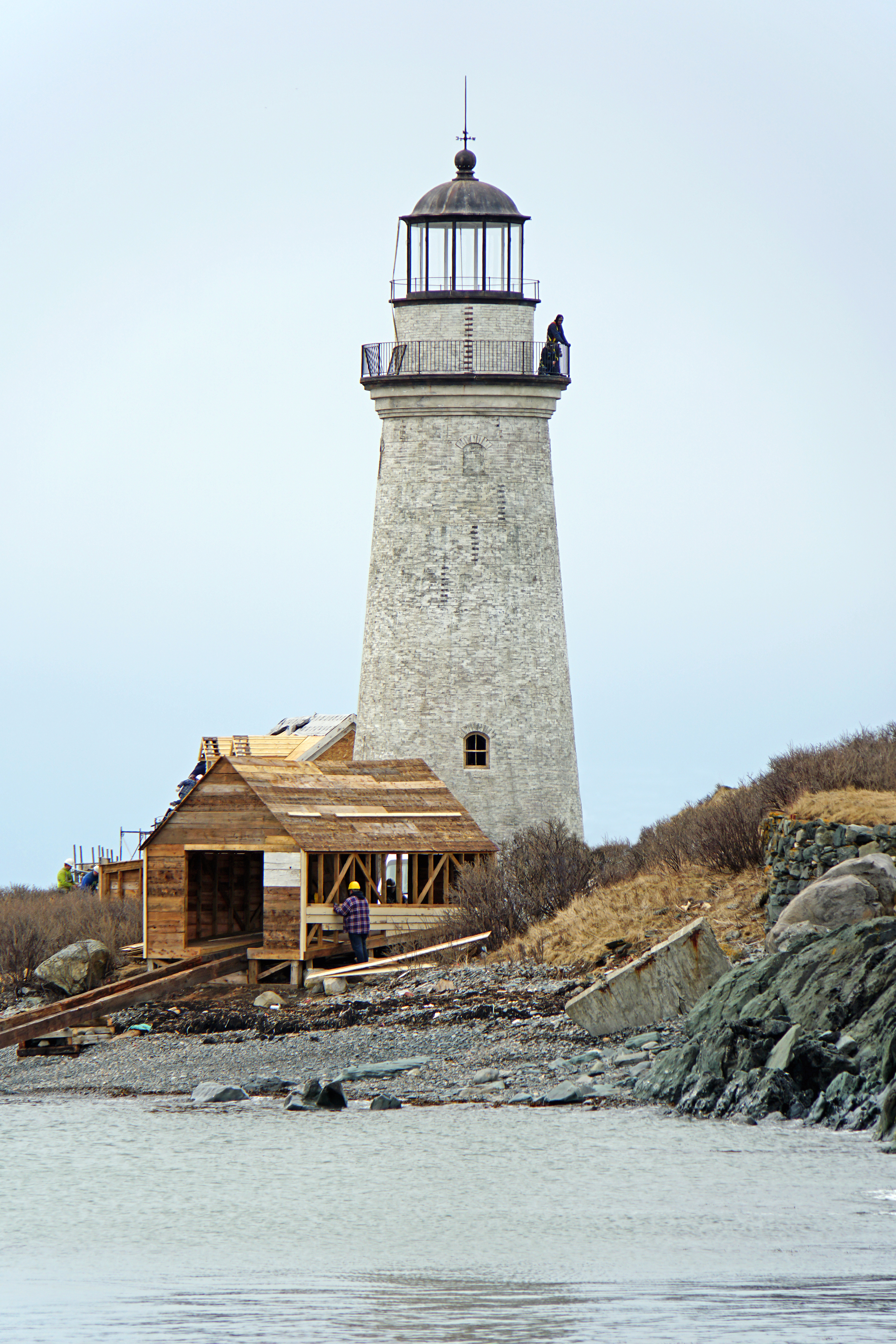
The Lighthouse film set, Nova Scotia, Canada (pictured in April 2018)

Because the filmmakers could not find a lighthouse suitable for the needs of the production, they constructed a 70-foot (20-meter) makeshift lighthouse on Cape Forchu in Leif Erikson Park in Yarmouth County, Nova Scotia. The lighthouse was outfitted with a replica 3rd-order Fresnel lens built by Artworks Florida, a company specializing in reproduction lenses. It was made of plexiglass and had an octopus-like design with eight panels. A24 later auctioned the lens alongside other props from the film for charity, though it failed to sell. Most of the interior scenes were filmed on sets constructed inside a hangar at Yarmouth Airport and in soundstages near Halifax. Another shooting location was a large pool for training emergency responders, which the filmmakers used for shots of and from the ocean. Principal photography began on April 9, 2018, and lasted slightly over schedule at 35 days as a result of unforeseen circumstances on set. Problems were attributed to harsh weather, the lighthouse set's remoteness, and the technical demands of the shoot. Additional photography took place in Pinewood and Brooklyn. The Lighthouse qualified for a $1.673 million tax subsidy from the Nova Scotian government.

The Lighthouse is director of photography Jarin Blaschke's third collaboration with Eggers. Eggers wanted to film in black-and-white with a boxy aspect ratio. They faced opposition from executives seeking a more widespread distribution in theaters, but felt shooting in color would undermine the film's artistic integrity. In pre-production, Eggers planned to shoot the film in 1.33:1 aspect ratio. He reconsidered when Blaschke suggested shooting in 1.19:1 aspect ratio, which was used fleetingly during the film industry's transition to sound, as a joke. They found that the footage better conveyed the lighthouse's vertical orientation, the isolation of the characters, and a sense of confinement when Winslow and Wake are together. The filmmakers cited M (1931), Man of Aran (1934), Pickpocket (1959), In Cold Blood (1967), and the works of Béla Tarr and Ingmar Bergman as significant influences on the film's visual hallmarks.

=== Cinematography ===
The Lighthouse was shot on 35 mm film using Panavision Panaflex Millennium XL2 cameras with vintage Bausch and Lomb Baltar lenses. Occasionally, to capture flashback sequences or scenes of heightened conflict, the camera crew shot with three Petzval lenses and another 50 mm lens that had been refurbished by Panavision. Filmmakers created the onscreen world with a stark visual palette reminiscent of orthochromatic film. One of Blaschke's initial responsibilities was to produce the shots with a sufficient antique quality. He developed a process of testing the utility of digital footage in color negative film stock, first with Kodak Vision3 500T 5219 film and then Eastman Double-X 5222 stock. Blaschke continued this process after acquiring the Baltar lenses for the shoot, this time with shortpass filters—a class of scientific optical filters—and photographic filters most transparent to blue-green and ultraviolet light. The specifications were so unusual that it required the manufacture of custom sets of filters by Schneider Kreuznach, which was expensive and time-consuming. Blaschke recalled, "I sketched a desired spectrograph on graph paper, indicating a complete elimination of all light beyond 570 nanometers [mid-yellow] while allowing all shorter wavelengths to pass freely. At that point, I was unsure of the true light loss and I was pretty nervous about it." Post-production editing of The Lighthouse occurred simultaneously at the FotoKem film laboratories in Burbank, California.

Screenshot of Wake and Winslow in a drunken argument at night. The filmmakers deployed artificial lighting for both day and nighttime scenes, in this case a single lantern equipped with a halogen bulb.

Lighting, especially for night scenes, posed a challenge for the camera crew because they were shooting at a low film speed, which made film stock less sensitive to light. This was compounded by the fact that the Double-X 5222 stock had a substantially lower capacity for exposure latitude than either color film stock or digital film. The filmmakers therefore deployed artificial lights when scenes could not be sufficiently rendered with only natural lighting. They rigged exterior nighttime scenes with 9K and 18K HMI lamps manufactured in Nova Scotia and Toronto; these lamps were also used for daytime shots, in a setup involving the reflection of light off of stretched muslin fixtures. For the interior night scenes, sets were lit by a single lantern equipped with 500- and 800-watt halogen bulbs, occasionally supplemented by a paper lantern for close up shots. The lights, according to Blaschke, were so bright that some camera crew wore sunglasses on the set.

=== Costumes ===
Eggers worked with costume designer Linda Muir to develop The Lighthouse's costumes. The setting, the film's black-and-white aesthetic, and the personalities of the characters, Muir says, compelled her clothing choices. Muir dressed Dafoe in ragged clothes to project a "maritime look and feel" for his character. For example, with Wake's jackets, she indicates his demeanor by the number, type, and placement of buttons. On the other hand, Pattinson's costumes reflected a style Muir said was deliberately ambiguous. Eggers used photos of lighthouse workers in different workwear as reference material, but was not consciously seeking to convey ideas through the costumes beyond Winslow and Wake's occupation.

Winslow and Wake's wardrobe consists of four looks each; a uniform, undergarments, a thick cable knit sweater outfit, and an outfit made of oilskin, a fabric waterproofed with wax or oil. The designers sourced and created many pieces anew because there were not widely available for purchase. It was particularly expensive to produce period accurate footwear, such as Wellington boots. To rectify the issue, the filmmakers made use of shoes commonly used in professional theater. The most difficult items for the filmmakers to obtain were the oilskin pieces, given that there were no readily available garments in circulation. The costume-making crew designed hats, overalls, and coats that Muir then waxed and dried in the sun to achieve the desired quality. They also developed the cable knit sweaters from scratch on finding that modern sweaters were lacking the appropriate detail.

=== Music ===
The Lighthouse was scored by composer Mark Korven, his second film collaboration with Eggers. The filmmakers distinguished the score from The Witch with music suggestive of the sounds and mythologies of the sea. They also aimed to express the reactions of the characters in isolation. The earliest musical approach was inspired by sea shanties and conch music, and the filmmakers created a placeholder temp score from a playlist containing horror movie scores, ancient Greek conch music, and compositions of Italian composer Giacinto Scelsi. Eggers deliberately avoided any string accompaniments until he and the musicians experimented for more dissonant sounds. The Lighthouse's final score was recorded using a cello, double bass, brass, percussion, woodwinds, a harmonica, and mallets that produced friction noises when rubbed on rough surfaces. A key instrument employed was a homemade acoustic device developed by a luthier at Korven's request. Korven found scoring the ending scene the most difficult because the music had to support the scene's emotionally intense tone.

The soundtrack was released by Milan Records digitally on October 18, 2019, followed by the rollout of an LP record by Sacred Bones Records.

== Analysis ==
=== Genre ===
The Lighthouse has been described as a horror film by critics such as Manohla Dargis of The New York Times, and as a psychological thriller by critics such as Lee Marshall of Screen Daily. Other critics said it was a film that could not be pigeonholed, with Owen Gleiberman of Variety declaring that "you may feel in your bones that you're watching a supernatural shocker [...] Are we seeing a slice of survival, a horror film, or a study in slow-brewing mutual insanity? How about all of the above?" Michael Phillips of The Chicago Tribune echoed Gleiberman's statements, noting that the film's plot did not operate "as any sort of conventional ghost story, or thriller, or anything".

Eggers himself describes the genre as being akin to "a weird tale". Pattinson stated in GQ that he thinks the film is "100% a comedy" and how when the film was up for awards season, he tried to convince the Hollywood Foreign Press Association that the film should be eligible for a nomination in the Golden Globe for Best Motion Picture – Musical or Comedy category.

=== Psychoanalysis ===
Eggers said the film's subtext was influenced by Sigmund Freud and he hoped that "it's a movie where both Jung and Freud would be furiously eating their popcorn". Given his simultaneous fear and admiration of the senior lighthouse keeper, the younger keeper displays an Oedipal fixation. Pattinson commented on the father–son dynamic in the film by stating that "I was pretty conscious of how I wanted the relationship to come across. In a lot of ways, he sort of wants a daddy" and that, as the film progresses, his character is increasingly "looking for Willem [Dafoe]'s validation" as both a boss and a father-figure. The film also echoes the Jungian archetype of the shadow, the unknown "dark side" or blind spot of one's personality. Dafoe illustrated that the two keepers are "put in this situation that's like a purgatory and then the little personality, the little sense of self that they've created for themselves starts to get stripped away. You see what their real nature is and that points them into a kind of desperation." Rosie Fletcher of Den of Geek gathered: "The way the pair embody wisdom and foolishness, hedonism and inspiration, honesty and trickery and play with masculine and feminine roles [...] seems to support the idea that one is the shadow of the other on some level and speaks further to Jung's theories."

=== Mythology ===
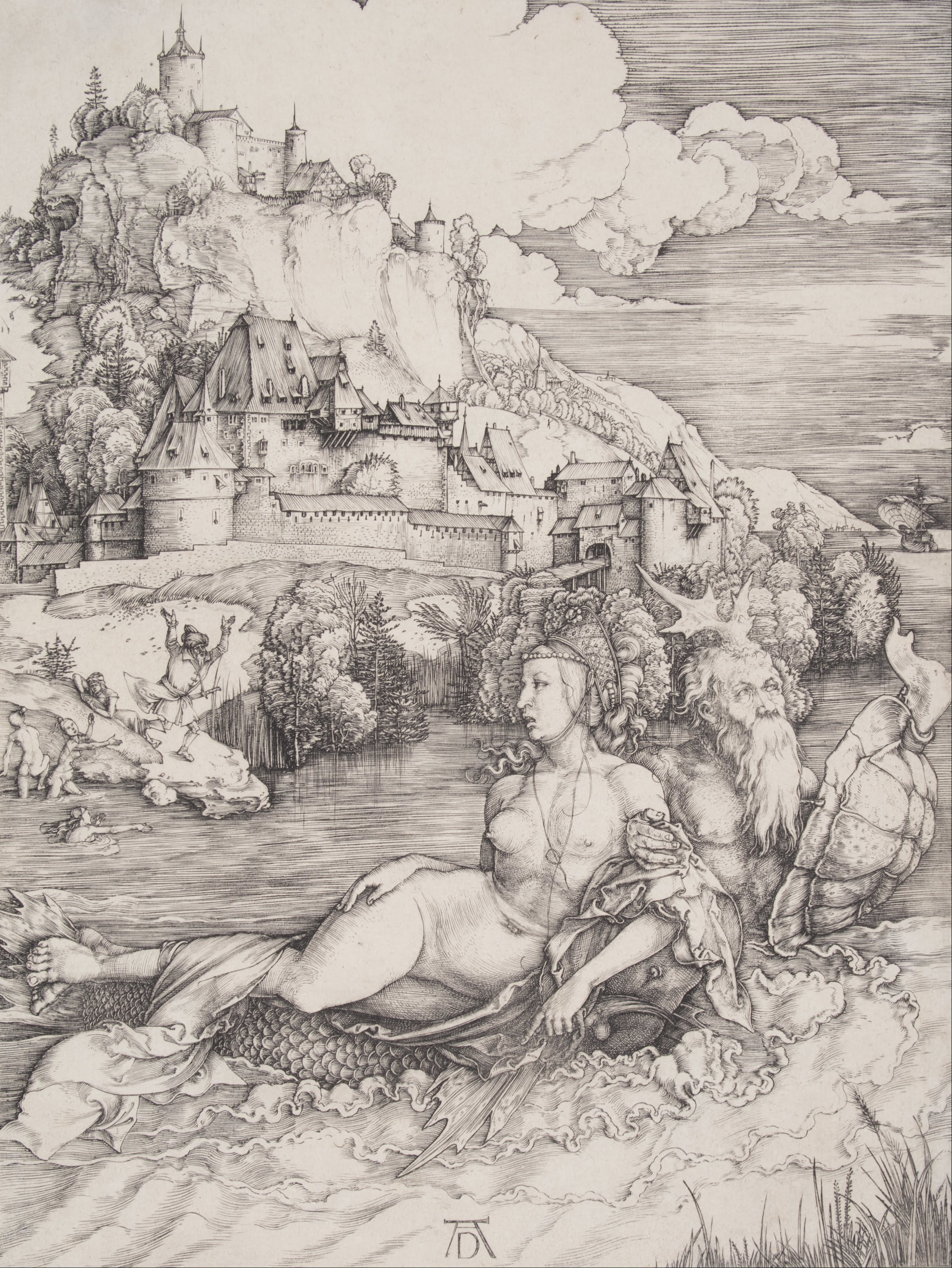
The Sea Monster (c. 1493–1503) by Albrecht Dürer

In the film, the senior lighthouse keeper Thomas warns the younger keeper Ephraim of a maritime superstition that is bad luck to kill a seabird, specifically a seagull. However, after getting irritated by one, Ephraim kills it later and brings on a storm that traps the two men on the island. At the end of the film, Ephraim is seen on the ground with seagulls plucking out his organs. This plot invokes the 1798 poem "The Rime of the Ancient Mariner" by Samuel Taylor Coleridge, in which a mariner kills an Albatross and brings disaster to his ship.

The fate of the younger lighthouse keeper also invokes the myth of Prometheus, as, after finally reaching the light and learning what is in it, he falls down the stairs of the lighthouse and his organs are plucked out by seagulls. On the other hand, the older keeper was modeled on Proteus, a "prophecy-telling ocean god who serves Poseidon", as he "makes that uncannily accurate prediction for how Ephraim will die at the end of the movie" and is even seen with tentacles and sea creatures stuck to his body in one of the younger man's hallucinations. Albrecht Dürer's engraving The Sea Monster inspired Wake's appearance, with Eggers saying: "The Proteus figure that is more clearly nautical is somewhat based on a sea monster by Dürer, who carries a tortoise shell shield." Eggers explained the allusions to classical mythology by saying they are present "Partially because Melville goes there and partially because of I'm sure our unhealthy Jungian leanings".

=== Sexuality ===
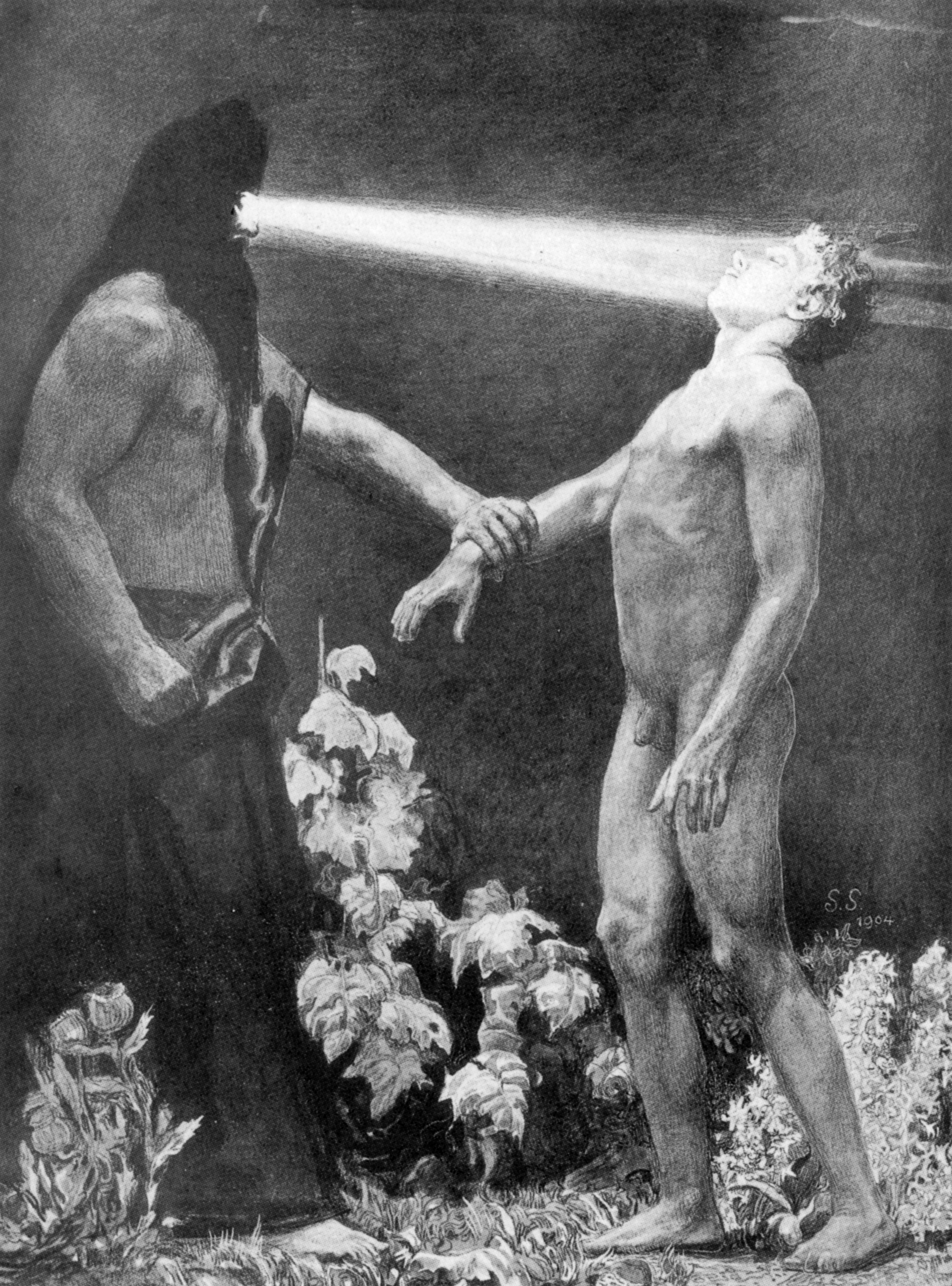
Hypnosis (1904) by Sascha Schneider, which provided visual reference for a scene in the film

The film primarily depicts two men alone in close quarters on an island and contains explicit depictions of male sexuality and homoeroticism, but, when asked whether the film was "a love story", Robert Eggers replied:

Am I saying these characters are gay? No. I'm not saying they're not either. Forget about complexities of human sexuality or their particular inclinations. I'm more about questions than answers in this movie.

The phallic imagery of the lighthouse is explicit, as Eggers described it in the script as an erect penis, revealing that the film was meant to include "a very juvenile shot of a lighthouse moving like an erect penis and a match-cut to actual erect penis" belonging to Howard, but this sequence was removed at the request of the financiers. A body double of Pattinson was used to film the scene. Pattinson said that when he first saw the shot, he didn't even realize what he was looking at, initially mistaking it for the lighthouse. He then joked in Sky News interview that the phallus might have belonged to director Robert Eggers.

Sexual fantasy and masturbation are also recurring themes in the film. For Dafoe, the androphilia in the film is blatant, but it is also used to explore what it means to be a man: "They have a sense of guilt, of wrong [...] it's got existential roots [...] about masculinity and domination and submission." After beating the older lighthouse keeper into submission, the younger keeper assumes a dominant role, calling the older man "dog" and dragging him on a leash. Commenting on this scene, Pattinson said "there's definitely a take where we were literally trying to pull each other's pants down. It literally almost looked like foreplay."

The mythological and artistic influences of the film underscore its eroticism. Eggers acknowledged the visual influence of symbolist artists Sascha Schneider and Jean Delville, whose "mythic paintings in a homoerotic style become perfect candidates as imagery that's going to work itself into the script." The composition of a shot in the film was consciously adapted from Schneider's Hypnosis.

== Release ==
The Lighthouse had its world premiere on May 19, 2019, in the Directors' Fortnight section of the Cannes Film Festival, and it was screened at the Toronto International Film Festival and the Atlantic Film Festival in September. It was distributed by A24 in North America and by Focus Features internationally, and was released in theaters on October 18, 2019.

=== Home media ===
The Lighthouse was released on digital in the United States on December 20, 2019, and in Blu-ray and DVD formats on January 7, 2020, by Lionsgate Home Entertainment. Later, it was released on 4K Ultra HD Blu-ray by A24 on March 28, 2023.

== Reception ==
=== Box office ===
The film grossed $10.9 million in the United States and $7.5 million in other territories, for a worldwide box-office total of $18.3 million.

Its limited opening weekend in the U.S., the film grossed $419,764 from eight theaters, for an average of $52,471 per venue. Its second weekend, the film expanded to 586 theaters and grossed $3.75 million, placing eighth at the box office. The following weekend, the film expanded to 978 theaters, but its gross fell 34.7% to $2 million, and it finished in 13th place.

=== Critical response ===
On review aggregation website Rotten Tomatoes, the film holds an approval rating of 90% based on 398 reviews, with an average score of 8/10. The site's consensus reads: "A gripping story brilliantly filmed and led by a pair of powerhouse performances, The Lighthouse further establishes Robert Eggers as a filmmaker of exceptional talent." On Metacritic, the film has a weighted average score of 83 out of 100 based on 52 critics, indicating "universal acclaim".

Owen Gleiberman of Variety called the film "darkly exciting" and "made with extraordinary skill," commenting that "the movie, building on The Witch, proves that Robert Eggers possesses something more than impeccable genre skill. He has the ability to lock you into the fever of what's happening onscreen." Robbie Collin of The Daily Telegraph gave the film a perfect score, calling Dafoe's performance "astounding" and comparing Pattinson's to that of Daniel Day-Lewis in There Will Be Blood, saying, "that's no comparison to make lightly, but everything about The Lighthouse lands with a crash. It's cinema to make your head and soul ring." Peter Bradshaw of The Guardian, in addition to praising the performances of Dafoe and Pattinson, also praised the screenplay, stating that the "script is barnacled with resemblances to Coleridge, Shakespeare, Melville – and there's also some staggeringly cheeky black-comic riffs and gags and the two of them resemble no-one so much as Wilfrid Brambell and Harry H. Corbett: Steptoe and Son in hell." Manohla Dargis of The New York Times praised the character development, production design, acting, and themes, and Michael Phillips of the Chicago Tribune gave the film three stars out of five, comparing it to The Odd Couple (1968) and The Dumb Waiter (1957), and lauding the cinematography.

Conversely, Sandra Hall of The Sydney Morning Herald said the film's attempts at suspense were not successful, and Simran Hans of The Guardian gave it two stars out of five, saying the performances felt more like an "experiment than conducive to eliciting meaning." Mick LaSalle of the San Francisco Chronicle said the film was well-made, but "fails to give us the one thing that might have sustained an audience's interest over the course of 109 excruciating minutes: a compelling story." Dana Stevens of Slate concluded her review by stating that "The Lighthouse is at its strongest when it resembles the dark comedy of a Beckett play, complete with earthy scatological humor. [...] But as the mythological references pile up and the forbidden light atop the tower accrues ever more (and ever vaguer) symbolic meaning, the film sometimes seems funny [...] not because of but in spite of the filmmakers' intentions", and that, by the end, she became "impatient" with Eggers' "reliance on atmosphere [...] to take the place of story" and found herself "identifying with the stranded seafarers: I desperately wanted to get out."

In 2025, the film ranked number 97 on the "Readers' Choice" edition of The New York Times' list of "The 100 Best Movies of the 21st Century."

=== Accolades ===
Awards and nominations received by The Lighthouse (2019 film)
Award	Date of ceremony	Category	Recipient(s)	Result	Ref.
Academy Awards	February 9, 2020	Best Cinematography	Jarin Blaschke	Nominated	
Austin Film Critics Association	January 6, 2020	Best Supporting Actor	Willem Dafoe	Nominated	
Austin Film Critics Association	January 6, 2020	Best Cinematography	Jarin Blaschke	Nominated	
Bram Stoker Awards	April 18, 2020	Superior Achievement, Screenplay	Robert Eggers & Max Eggers	Nominated	
British Academy Film Awards	February 2, 2020	Best Cinematography	Jarin Blaschke	Nominated	
Cannes Film Festival	May 25, 2019	FIPRESCI Prize – Directors' Fortnight/Critics' Week	Robert Eggers	Won	
Chicago Film Critics Association	December 14, 2019	Best Cinematography	Jarin Blaschke	Nominated	
Critics' Choice Movie Awards	January 12, 2020	Best Supporting Actor	Willem Dafoe	Nominated	
Critics' Choice Movie Awards	January 12, 2020	Best Cinematography	Jarin Blaschke	Nominated	
Detroit Film Critics Society	December 9, 2019	Best Actor	Robert Pattinson	Nominated	
Detroit Film Critics Society	December 9, 2019	Best Supporting Actor	Willem Dafoe	Nominated	
Detroit Film Critics Society	December 9, 2019	Best Screenplay	Robert Eggers & Max Eggers	Nominated	
Georgia Film Critics Association	January 10, 2020	Best Supporting Actor	Willem Dafoe	Nominated	
Georgia Film Critics Association	January 10, 2020	Best Cinematography	Jarin Blaschke	Nominated	
Georgia Film Critics Association	January 10, 2020	Best Production Design	Craig Lathrop, Matt Likely	Nominated	
Gotham Awards	December 2, 2019	Best Actor	Willem Dafoe	Nominated	
Hollywood Critics Association Awards	January 9, 2020	Best Cinematography	Jarin Blaschke	Nominated	
Houston Film Critics Society	January 2, 2020	Best Supporting Actor	Willem Dafoe	Nominated	
Independent Spirit Awards	February 8, 2020	Best Director	Robert Eggers	Nominated	
Independent Spirit Awards	February 8, 2020	Best Male Lead	Robert Pattinson	Nominated	
Independent Spirit Awards	February 8, 2020	Best Supporting Male	Willem Dafoe	Won	
Independent Spirit Awards	February 8, 2020	Best Editing	Louise Ford	Nominated	
Independent Spirit Awards	February 8, 2020	Best Cinematography	Jarin Blaschke	Won	
London Film Critics' Circle Awards	January 30, 2020	British/Irish Actor of the Year	Robert Pattinson	Won	
San Diego Film Critics Society	December 9, 2019	Best Supporting Actor	Willem Dafoe	Nominated	
San Diego Film Critics Society	December 9, 2019	Best Cinematography	Jarin Blaschke	Won	
San Francisco Bay Area Film Critics Circle	December 16, 2019	Best Supporting Actor	Willem Dafoe	Nominated	
Satellite Awards	December 19, 2019	Best Motion Picture – Drama	The Lighthouse	Nominated	
Satellite Awards	December 19, 2019	Best Supporting Actor	Willem Dafoe	Won	
Seattle Film Critics Society	December 16, 2019	Best Picture	The Lighthouse	Nominated	
Seattle Film Critics Society	December 16, 2019	Best Director	Robert Eggers	Nominated	
Seattle Film Critics Society	December 16, 2019	Best Supporting Actor	Willem Dafoe	Won	
Seattle Film Critics Society	December 16, 2019	Best Cinematography	Jarin Blaschke	Nominated	
St. Louis Film Critics Association	December 15, 2019	Best Horror Film	The Lighthouse	Nominated	
St. Louis Film Critics Association	December 15, 2019	Best Cinematography	Jarin Blaschke	Runner-up	
Toronto Film Critics Association	December 8, 2019	Best Supporting Actor	Willem Dafoe	Runner-up	
Washington D.C. Area Film Critics Association	December 8, 2019	Best Cinematography	Jarin Blaschke	Nominated	
Grande Prêmio do Cinema Brasileiro	November 28, 2021	Best International Film	The Lighthouse	Nominated	
