= 2019 Cannes Film Festival =

- Official poster of the 72nd Cannes Film Festival featuring Agnès Varda, while filming her debut film La Pointe Courte (1955)
- Opening film: The Dead Don't Die
- Closing film: The Specials
- Location: Cannes, France
- Founded: 1946
- Awards: Palme d'Or: Parasite
- Hosted by: Édouard Baer
- No. of films: 21 (In Competition)
- Festival date: 14–25 May 2019
- Website: festival-cannes.com/en

Cannes Film Festival
- 2020 2018

The 72nd annual Cannes Film Festival took place from 14 to 25 May 2019. Mexican filmmaker Alejandro González Iñárritu served as jury president for the main competition.

South Korean filmmaker Bong Joon-ho won the Palme d'Or, the festival's top prize, for the drama film Parasite, becoming the first Korean to win the award. The Honorary Palme d'Or was awarded to French actor Alain Delon.

The festival honored French filmmaker Agnès Varda, who died early that year, featuring her on the official poster of the festival. The photograph used was taken during the filming of her debut film La Pointe Courte (1955), which screened at the Cannes Film Festival.

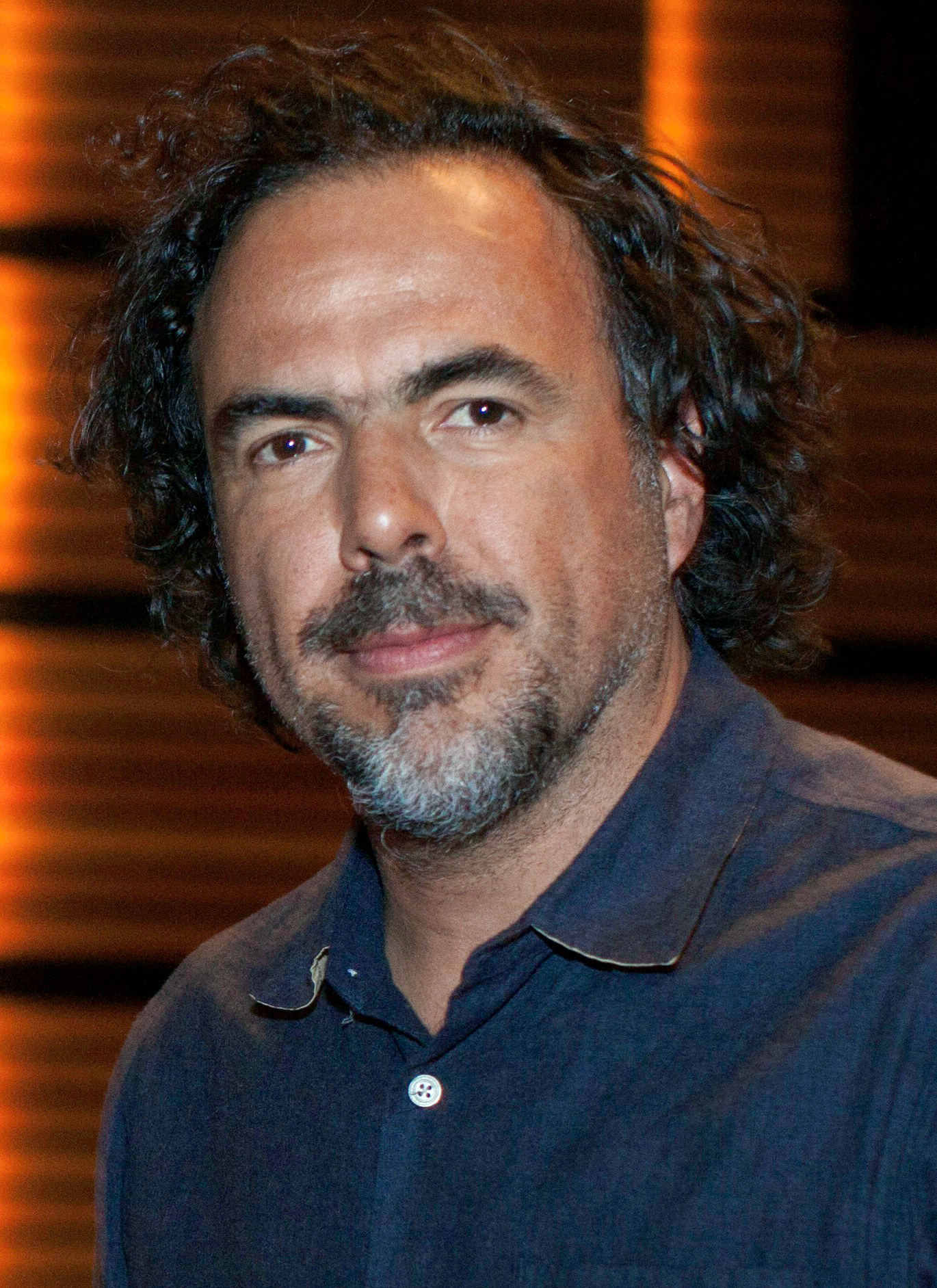
Alejandro González Iñárritu, Main Competition jury president

The festival opened with The Dead Don't Die by Jim Jarmusch, and closed with The Specials by Éric Toledano and Olivier Nakache.

== Juries ==
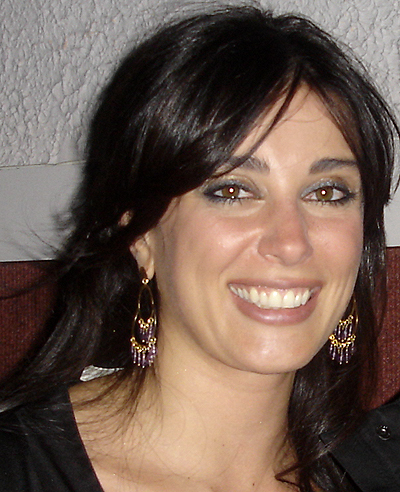
Nadine Labaki, Un Certain Regard jury president

=== Main competition ===
- Alejandro González Iñárritu, Mexican director – Jury President
- Enki Bilal, French author, artist and director
- Robin Campillo, French director
- Elle Fanning, American actress
- Yorgos Lanthimos, Greek director
- Maimouna N'Diaye, Senegalese actress
- Paweł Pawlikowski, Polish director
- Kelly Reichardt, American director
- Alice Rohrwacher, Italian director

=== Un Certain Regard ===
- Nadine Labaki, Lebanese-Canadian director – Jury President
- Lisandro Alonso, Argentine director
- Lukas Dhont, Belgian director
- Marina Foïs, French actress
- Nurhan Sekerci-Porst, German film producer

=== Caméra d'or ===
- Rithy Panh, Cambodian-French director – Jury President
- Alice Diop, French director
- Benoît Delhomme, French cinematographer
- Sandrine Marques, French director, author and film critic
- Nicolas Naegelen, French president and director of Polyson

=== Cinéfondation and Short Films Competition ===
- Claire Denis, French director – Jury President
- Eran Kolirin, Israeli director
- Panos H. Koutras, Greek director
- Stacy Martin, French-British actress
- Cătălin Mitulescu, Romanian director

=== Critics' Week ===
- Ciro Guerra, Colombian director – Jury President
- Jonas Carpignano, Italian-American director
- Amira Casar, French-English actress
- Djia Mambu, Belgian-Congolese film journalist and critic
- Marianne Slot, French-Danish film producer

=== L'Œil d'or ===
- Yolande Zauberman, French director, Jury President
- Romane Bohringer, French actress and director
- Éric Caravaca, French actor and director
- Iván Giroud, Cuban film festival director
- Ross McElwee, American director

=== Queer Palm ===
- Virginie Ledoyen, French actress, Jury President
- Claire Duguet, French cinematographer and director
- Kee-Yoon Kim, French comedian
- Filipe Matzembacher, Brazilian director
- Marcio Reolon, Brazilian director

== Official sections ==
=== In Competition ===
The following films were selected to compete for the Palme d'Or:

English title	Original title	Director(s)	Production country
Atlantics (CdO)	Atlantique	Mati Diop	Senegal, France, Belgium
Bacurau (QP)		Kleber Mendonça Filho and Juliano Dornelles	Brazil, France
The Dead Don't Die (opening film)		Jim Jarmusch	United States
Frankie (QP)		Ira Sachs	United States, France, Portugal
A Hidden Life		Terrence Malick	United States, Germany, Austria
It Must Be Heaven		Elia Suleiman	Palestine, France, Germany, Canada, Qatar, Turkey
Little Joe		Jessica Hausner	Austria, Germany, United Kingdom
Matthias & Maxime (QP)	Matthias et Maxime	Xavier Dolan	Canada
Les Misérables (CdO)		Ladj Ly	France
Mektoub, My Love: Intermezzo		Abdellatif Kechiche	France
Oh Mercy! (QP)	Roubaix, une lumière	Arnaud Desplechin	France
Once Upon a Time in Hollywood		Quentin Tarantino	United States, United Kingdom, China
Pain and Glory (QP)	Dolor y gloria	Pedro Almodóvar	Spain
Parasite	기생충	Bong Joon-ho	South Korea
Portrait of a Lady on Fire (QP)	Portrait de la jeune fille en feu	Céline Sciamma	France
Sibyl		Justine Triet	France, Belgium
Sorry We Missed You		Ken Loach	United Kingdom, France, Belgium
The Traitor	Il traditore	Marco Bellocchio	Italy, France, Brazil, Germany
The Whistlers	La Gomera	Corneliu Porumboiu	Romania, France, Germany
The Wild Goose Lake	南方车站的聚会	Diao Yinan	China, France
Young Ahmed	Le Jeune Ahmed	Jean-Pierre Dardenne and Luc Dardenne	Belgium, France

(CdO) indicates film eligible for the Caméra d'Or as a feature directorial debut.
(QP) indicates film in competition for the Queer Palm.

=== Un Certain Regard ===
The following films were selected to compete in the Un Certain Regard section:

English title	Original title	Director(s)	Production country
Adam (QP)		Maryam Touzani	Morocco
Beanpole (QP)	Дылда	Kantemir Balagov	Russia
The Bears' Famous Invasion of Sicily	La famosa invasione degli orsi in Sicilia	Lorenzo Mattotti	France, Italy
A Brother's Love (CdO)	La Femme de mon frère	Monia Chokri	Canada
Bull (CdO)		Annie Silverstein	United States
The Climb (CdO)		Michael Covino	United States
Fire Will Come	O que Arde	Óliver Laxe	Spain, France, Luxembourg
Liberté (QP)	Liberté	Albert Serra	Spain, France, Germany, Portugal
Homeward (CdO)	Evge	Nariman Aliev	Ukraine
The Invisible Life of Eurídice Gusmão	A Vida Invisível de Eurídice Gusmão	Karim Aïnouz	Brazil, Germany
Joan of Arc	Jeanne	Bruno Dumont	France
Nina Wu	灼人秘密	Midi Z	Taiwan, Malaysia, Myanmar
On a Magical Night	Chambre 212	Christophe Honoré	France, Belgium, Luxembourg
Once in Trubchevsk	Однажды в Трубчевске	Larissa Sadilova	Russia
Papicha		Mounia Meddour	Algeria, France
Port Authority (CdO) (QP)		Danielle Lessovitz	United States, France
Summer of Changsha (CdO)	六欲天	Zu Feng	China
The Swallows of Kabul	Les Hirondelles de Kaboul	Zabou Breitman and Eléa Gobé Mévellec	France, Switzerland, Luxembourg, Monaco

(CdO) indicates film eligible for the Caméra d'Or as a feature directorial debut.
(QP) indicates film in competition for the Queer Palm.

=== Out of Competition ===
The following films were selected to be screened out of competition:

English title	Original title	Director(s)	Production country
La Belle Époque		Nicolas Bedos	France
The Best Years of a Life	Les plus belles années d'une vie	Claude Lelouch	France
Diego Maradona (ŒdO)		Asif Kapadia	United Kingdom
Rocketman (QP)		Dexter Fletcher	United States
The Specials (closing film)	Hors normes	Olivier Nakache and Éric Toledano	France
Too Old to Die Young (episodes 4 and 5)		Nicolas Winding Refn	United States
Midnight Screenings
The Gangster, the Cop, the Devil	악인전	Lee Won-tae	South Korea
Lux Æterna		Gaspar Noé	France

(QP) indicates film in competition for the Queer Palm.
(ŒdO) indicates film eligible for the Œil d'or for documentary.

=== Special Screenings ===
The following films were selected be shown in the special screenings section:

English title	Original title	Director(s)	Production country
5B (ŒdO)		Dan Krauss	United States
Chicuarotes		Gael García Bernal	Mexico
The Cordillera of Dreams (ŒdO)	La cordillera de los sueños	Patricio Guzmán	France, Chile
Family Romance, LLC		Werner Herzog	Germany, United States, Japan
For Sama (ŒdO)	من أجل سما	Waad Al Kateab and Edward Watts	Syrian, United Kingdom, United States
Ice on Fire (ŒdO)		Leila Conners	United States
Que sea ley (ŒdO)		Juan Solanas	Argentina
Share (CdO)		Pippa Bianco	United States
Living and Knowing You Are Alive	Être vivant et le savoir	Alain Cavalier	France
Tommaso		Abel Ferrara	Italy

(CdO) indicates film eligible for the Caméra d'Or as a feature directorial debut.
(ŒdO) indicates film eligible for the Œil d'or for documentary feature.

=== Short Films Competition ===
Out of 4,240 entries, the following films were selected to compete for the Short Film Palme d'Or.

English title	Original title	Director(s)	Production country
The Van		Erenik Beqiri	Albania, France
Anna		Dekel Berenson	Ukraine, Israel, United Kingdom
The Jump (ŒdO)		Vanessa Dumont and Nicolas Davenel	France
The Distance Between Us and the Sky (QP)		Vasilis Kekatos	Greece, France
All Inclusive		Teemu Nikki	Finland
Who Talks	Ingen lyssnar	Elin Övergaard	Sweden
And Then the Bear		Agnès Patron	France
Butterflies	Parparim	Yona Rozenkier	Israel
Monster God	Monstruo Dios	Agustina San Martín	Argentina
White Echo		Chloë Sevigny	United States
The Nap	La Siesta	Federico Luis Tachella	Argentina

(ŒdO) indicates film eligible for the Œil d'or for documentary.
(QP) indicates film in competition for the Queer Palm.

=== Cinéfondation ===
The Cinéfondation section focuses on films made by students at film schools. The following 17 entries (14 live-action and 3 animated films) were selected out of 2,000 submissions. Six of the films selected represent schools participating in Cinéfondation for the first time.

English title	Original title	Director(s)	School
Ambience		Wisam Al Jafari	Dar al-Kalima University College of Arts and Culture, Palestine
Mano a mano		Louise Courvoisier	CinéFabrique, France
One Hundred and Twenty-Eight Thousand	Sto dvacet osm tisíc	Ondřej Erban	FAMU, Czech Republic
Jeremiah (QP)		Kenya Gillespie	University of Texas at Austin, United States
Pura vida		Martin Gonda	FTF VŠMU – Film and Television Faculty, Academy of Performing Arts, Slovakia
Adam		Shoki Lin	NTU, Singapore
Rift	Netek	Yarden Lipshitz Louz	Sapir College, Israel
Solar Plexus		David McShane	NFTS, United Kingdom
Rosso: A True Lie About a Fisherman	Rosso: La Vera storia falsa del pescatore Clemente	Antonio Messana	La Fémis, France
As Up to Now	Ahogy eddig	Katalin Moldovai	Budapest Metropolitan University (METU), Hungary
Favourites	Favoriten	Martin Monk	Filmakademie Wien, Austria
Roadkill		Leszek Mozga	UAL, United Kingdom
The Little Soul	Duszyczka	Barbara Rupik	PWSFTviT, Poland
Hiêu		Richard Van	CalArts, United States
Bamboe		Flo Van Deuren	RITCS, Belgium
Complex Subject (QP)	Slozhnopodchinennoe	Olesya Yakovleva	St Petersburg State University of Film and Television, Russia
Alien	령희	Yeon Jegwang	Korea National University of Arts, South Korea

(QP) indicates film in competition for the Queer Palm.

=== Cannes Classics ===
The full line-up for the Cannes Classics section was announced on 26 April 2019.

English title	Original title	Director(s)	Production country
Restorations
125, rue Montmartre (1959)		Gilles Grangier	France
La Cité de la peur (1994)		Alain Berbérian	France
Diary of a Nurse (1957)	护士日记	Tao Jin	China
The Doors (1991)		Oliver Stone	United States
Easy Rider (1969)		Dennis Hopper	United States
The Golden Age (1930)	L'Âge d'or	Luis Buñuel	France
The Horse Thief (1986)	盗马贼	Tian Zhuangzhuang	China
Loves of a Blonde (1965)	Lásky jedné plavovlásky	Miloš Forman	Czechoslovakia
Miracle in Milan (1951)	Miracolo a Milano	Vittorio De Sica	Italy
Moulin Rouge (1952)		John Huston	United Kingdom
Nazarín (1958)		Luis Buñuel	Mexico
Plogoff, des pierres contre des fusils (1980)		Nicole Le Garrec	France
Seven Beauties (1975)	Pasqualino Settebellezze	Lina Wertmüller	Italy
The Shining (1980)		Stanley Kubrick	United States, United Kingdom
Kanał (1957)		Andrzej Wajda	Poland
Toni (1934)		Jean Renoir	France
Twenty Years of African Cinema (1983)	Caméra d’Afrique	Férid Boughedir	Tunisia, France
The White Caravan (1964)	თეთრი ქარავანი / Белый караван	Tamaz Meliava and Eldar Shengelaya	Soviet Union
The White Snake Enchantress (1958)	白蛇伝	Taiji Yabushita	Japan
The Witness (1969)	A tanú	Péter Bacsó	Hungary
The Woman Who Dared (1943)	Le Ciel est à vous	Jean Grémillon	France
The Young and the Damned (1950)	Los Olvidados	Luis Buñuel	Mexico
Documentaries about Cinema
Cinecittà - I mestieri del cinema Bernardo Bertolucci		Mario Sesti	Italy
Forman vs. Forman		Helena Třeštíková and Jakub Hejna	Czech Republic, France
La Passione di Anna Magnani		Enrico Cerasuolo	Italy, France
Les Silences de Johnny		Pierre-William Glenn	France
Making Waves: The Art of Cinematic Sound		Midge Costin	United States

=== Cinéma de la Plage ===
The Cinéma de la Plage is a part of the Official Selection of the festival. The outdoors screenings at the beach cinema of Cannes are open to the public.

English title	Original title	Director(s)	Country
The 400 Blows (1959)	Les 400 Coups	François Truffaut	France
Any Number Can Win (1962)	Mélodie en sous-sol	Henri Verneuil	France, Italy
Boyz n the Hood (1991)		John Singleton	United States
La Cité de la peur (1994)		Alain Berbérian	France
Crouching Tiger, Hidden Dragon (2000)	臥虎藏龍	Ang Lee	Taiwan, Hong Kong, China, United States
Easy Rider (1969)		Dennis Hopper	United States
The Doors (1991)		Oliver Stone	United States
Hauts les filles (2019)		François Armanet	France
The Patriots (1994)	Les Patriotes	Éric Rochant	France

== Parallel sections ==
=== Critics' Week ===
The following films were selected to be screened in the Critics' Week section:

==== Features ====
English title	Original title	Director(s)	Production country
In Competition
Abou Leila		Amin Sidi-Boumédiène	Algeria, France, Qatar
A White, White Day	Hvítur, Hvítur Dagur	Hlynur Pálmason	Iceland, Denmark, Sweden
I Lost My Body	J'ai perdu mon corps	Jérémy Clapin	France
Land of Ashes	Ceniza Negra	Sofía Quirós Ubeda	Costa Rica, Argentina, Chile, France
Our Mothers	Nuestras Madres	César Díaz	Guatemala, Belgium, France
The Unknown Saint	Le Miracle du Saint Inconnu	Alaa Eddine Aljem	Morocco, France, Qatar
Vivarium		Lorcan Finnegan	Ireland, Belgium, Denmark
Short Films
Community Gardens	Kolektyvinai Sodai	Vytautas Katkus	Lithuania
Ikki illa meint		Andrias Høgenni	Denmark, Faroe Islands
Journey Through a Body (QP)		Camille Degeye	France
The Last Trip to the Seaside	Ultimul drum spre mare	Adi Voicu	Romania
Lucía en el limbo		Valentina Maurel	Belgium, France, Costa Rica
The Manila Lover (QP)		Johanna Pyykkö	Norway, Philippines
Party Day	Día de Festa	Sofia Bost	Portugal
She Runs (QP)		Qiu Yang	China, France
The Trap	Fakh	Nada Riyadh	Egypt, Germany
Tuesday From 8 to 6	Mardi de 8 à 18	Cecilia de Arce	France
Special Screenings
Dwelling in the Fuchun Mountains (closing film)	春江水暖	Gu Xiaogang	China
Heroes Don't Die	Les héros ne meurent jamais	Aude Léa Rapin	France, Belgium, Bosnia and Herzegovina
Litigante (opening film)		Franco Lolli	Colombia, France
You Deserve a Lover (QP)	Tu mérites un amour	Hafsia Herzi	France
Special Screenings – Short Films
Demonic		Pia Borg	Australia
Naptha		Moin Hussain	United Kingdom
Please Speak Continuously and Describe Your Experiences as They Come to You		Brandon Cronenberg	Canada
Invisible Hero	Invisível Herói	Cristèle Alves Meira	Portugal, France
Tenzo		Katsuya Tomita	Japan
Invitation Films from Morelia International Film Festival
Satán		Carlos Tapia González	Switzerland
San Miguel		Cris Gris	Mexico
The Girl with Two Heads	La chica con dos cabezas	Betzabé García	Mexico
The Thin Air	El aire Delgado	Pablo Giles	Mexico

(QP) indicates film in competition for the Queer Palm.

=== Directors' Fortnight ===
The following films were selected to be screened in the Directors' Fortnight section:

English title	Original title	Director(s)	Production country
In Competition
Alice and the Mayor	Alice et le Maire	Nicolas Pariser	France
An Easy Girl	Une fille facile	Rebecca Zlotowski	France
And Then We Danced (QP)	და ჩვენ ვიცეკვეთ	Levan Akin	Sweden, Georgia
The Bare Necessity (CdO)	Perdrix	Erwan Le Duc	France
Blow It to Bits	On va tout péter	Lech Kowalski	France
Deerskin (opening film)	Le Daim	Quentin Dupieux	France
Dogs Don't Wear Pants	Koirat eivät käytä housuja	J-P Valkeapää	Finland, Latvia
First Love	初恋	Takashi Miike	Japan, United Kingdom
For the Money	Por el dinero	Alejo Moguillansky	Argentina
Ghost Tropic		Bas Devos	Belgium
Give Me Liberty		Kirill Mikhanovsky	United States
The Halt	Ang Hupa	Lav Diaz	Philippines, China
The Lighthouse		Robert Eggers	Canada, United States
Particles (CdO)	Les Particules	Blaise Harrison	Switzerland, France
Lillian		Andreas Horvath	Austria
Oleg		Juris Kursietis	Latvia, Belgium, Lithuania, France
The Orphanage	Parwareshgah	Shahrbanoo Sadat	Denmark, Afghanistan, France
Sick, Sick, Sick (CdO)	Sem seu sangue	Alice Furtado	Brazil, Netherlands, France
Song Without a Name (CdO)	Canción sin nombre	Melina León	Peru, Switzerland
Tlamess (QP)		Ala Eddine Slim	Tunisia, France
To Live to Sing	活着唱着	Johnny Ma	China, France
Wounds		Babak Anvari	United States
Yves (closing film)		Benoît Forgeard	France
Zombi Child (QP)		Bertrand Bonello	France
Special Screenings
Red 11		Robert Rodriguez	United States
The Staggering Girl		Luca Guadagnino	Italy
Short and Medium-length Films
Ghost Pleasure	Plaisir fantôme	Morgan Simon	France
Grand Bouquet (QP)		Nao Yoshigai	Japan
Je te tiens		Sergio Caballero	Spain
The Marvelous Misadventures of the Stone Lady	Les Extraordinaires Mésaventures de la jeune fille de pierre	Gabriel Abrantes	France, Portugal
Movements		Jeong Da-hee	South Korea
Olla		Ariane Labed	France, United Kingdom
Piece of Meat		Jerrold Chong and Huang Junxiang	Singapore
Stay Awake, Be Ready	Hãy Tỉnh Thức và Sẵn Sàng	An Pham Thien	Vietnam, South Korea, United States
That Which Is to Come Is Just a Promise		Flatform	Italy, Netherlands, New Zealand
Two Sisters Who Are Not Sisters	Deux sœurs qui ne sont pas sœurs	Beatrice Gibson	United Kingdom, Germany, Canada, France
Exhibition
Go Where You Look! (Aloft, Chalkroom and To the Moon)		Laurie Anderson, Hsin-Chien Huang	

(CdO) indicates film eligible for the Caméra d'Or as a feature directorial debut.
(QP) indicates film in competition for the Queer Palm.

=== ACID ===
The following films were selected to be screened in the ACID (Association for the Distribution of Independent Cinema) section:

English title	Original title	Director(s)	Production country
Feature Films
As Happy As Possible	Rêve de jeunesse	Alain Raoust	France, Portugal
Blind Spot	L'Angle mort	Pierre Trividic, Patrick-Mario Bernard	France
Des Hommes (ŒdO)		Alice Odiot, Jean-Robert Viallet	France
Indianara (ŒdO, QP)		Aude Chevalier-Beaumel, Marcelo Barbosa	Brazil
Kongo (ŒdO)		Hadrien La Vapeur, Corto Vaclav	France
Mickey and the Bear		Annabelle Attanasio	United States
Solo (ŒdO)		Artemio Benki	France, Czech Republic, Argentina, Austria
Take Me Somewhere Nice		Ena Sendijarević	Netherlands, Bosnia and Herzegovina
Vif-argent		Stéphane Batut	France
ACID Trip #3 – Argentina
Brief Story from the Green Planet	Breve historia del planeta verde	Santiago Loza	Argentina, Brazil, Germany, Spain
Las Vegas		Juan Villegas	Argentina
Sangre blanca		Barbara Sarasola-Day	Argentina

(ŒdO) indicates film eligible for the Œil d'or as documentary.
(QP) indicates film in competition for the Queer Palm.

== Official awards ==
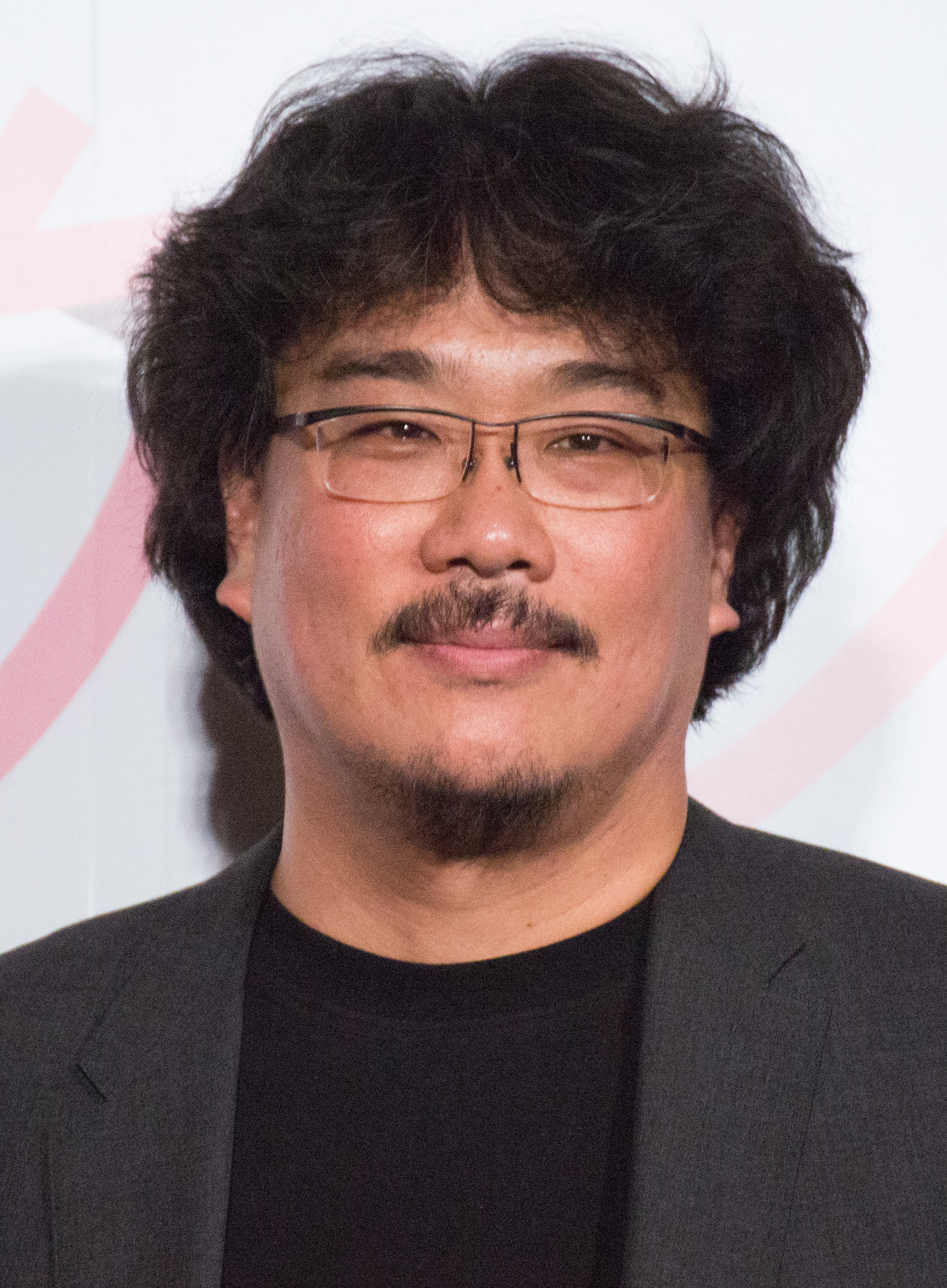
Bong Joon-ho, winner of the Palme d'Or

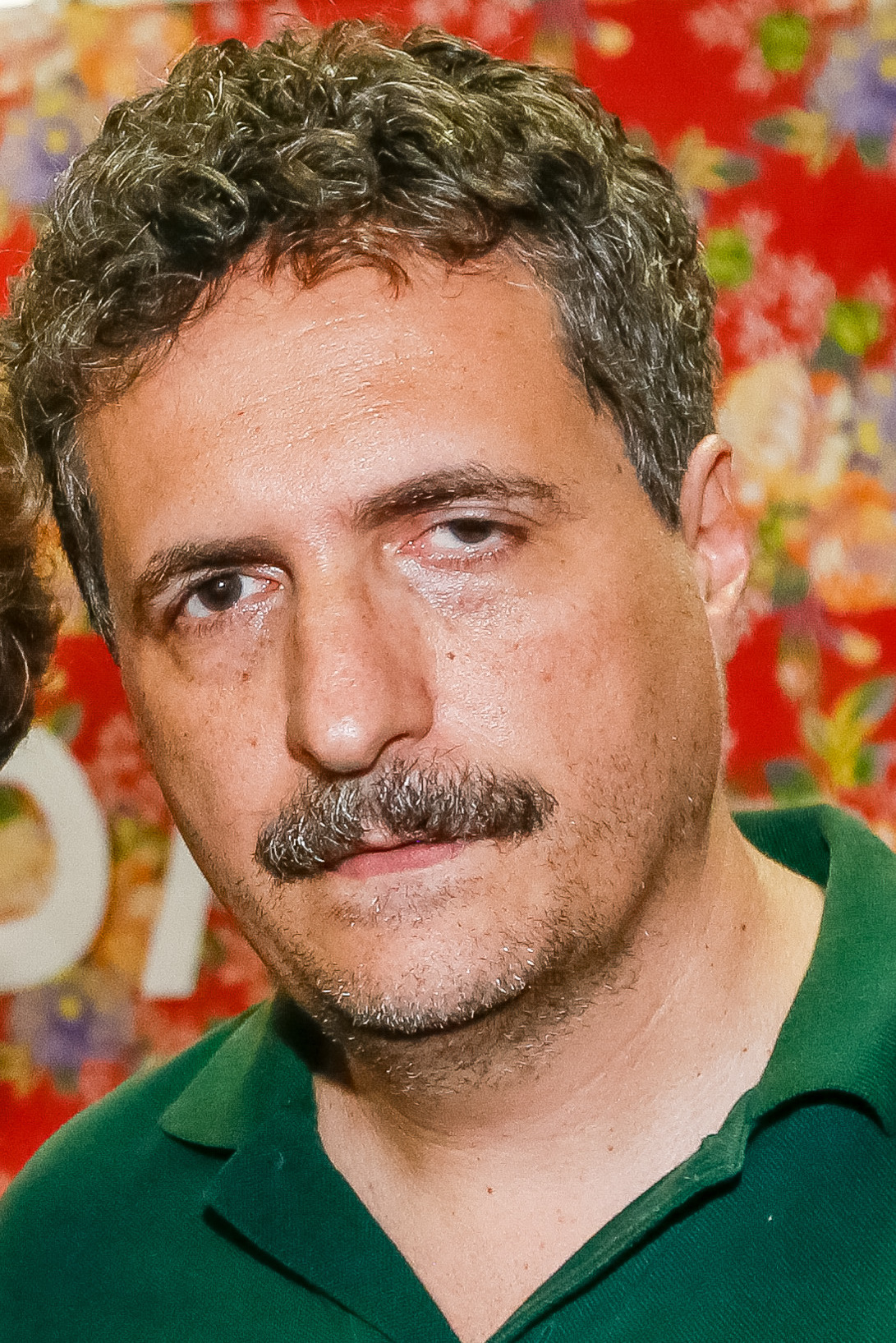
Kleber Mendonça Filho, Jury Prize winner

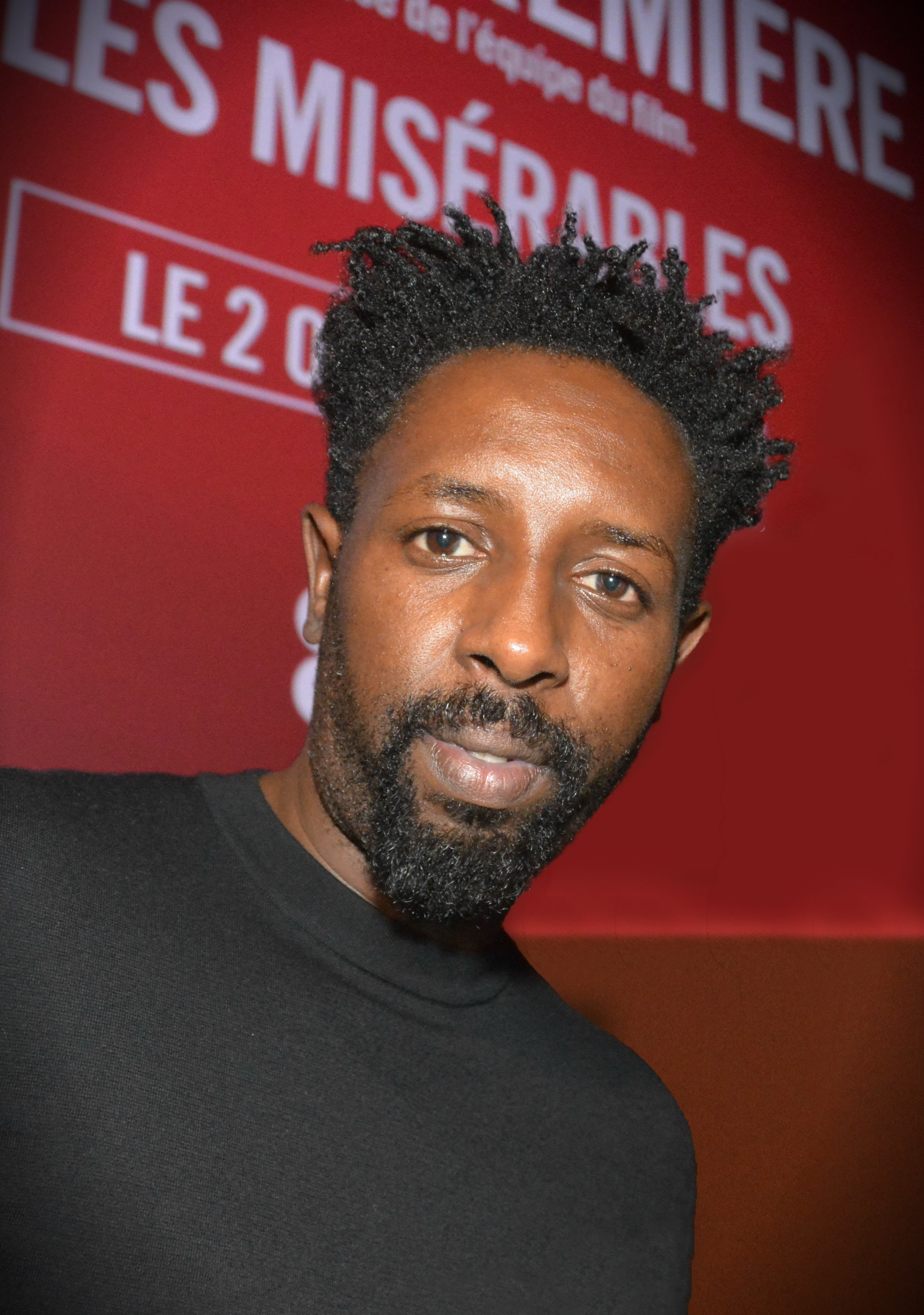
Ladj Ly, Jury Prize winner

=== Main competition ===
The following awards were presented for films shown In Competition:

- Palme d'Or: Parasite by Bong Joon-ho
- Grand Prix: Atlantics by Mati Diop
- Best Director: Jean-Pierre and Luc Dardenne for Young Ahmed
- Jury Prize:
  - Bacurau by Kleber Mendonça Filho and Juliano Dornelles
  - Les Misérables by Ladj Ly
- Best Actress: Emily Beecham for Little Joe
- Best Actor: Antonio Banderas for Pain and Glory
- Best Screenplay: Céline Sciamma for Portrait of a Lady on Fire
  - Special Mention: Elia Suleiman for It Must Be Heaven

=== Un Certain Regard ===
- Un Certain Regard Award: The Invisible Life of Eurídice Gusmão by Karim Aïnouz
- Jury Prize: Fire Will Come by Oliver Laxe
- Best Director: Kantemir Balagov for Beanpole
- Best Performance: Chiara Mastroianni for On a Magical Night
- Special Jury Prize: Liberté by Albert Serra
- Coup de Cœur Award:
  - A Brother's Love by Monia Chokri
  - The Climb by Michael Angelo Covino
- Special Mention: Joan of Arc by Bruno Dumont

=== Caméra d'Or ===
- Our Mothers by César Díaz

=== Short Films Competition ===
- Short Film Palme d'Or: The Distance Between Us and the Sky by Vasilis Kekatos
  - Special Mention: Monster God by Agustina San Martín

=== Cinéfondation ===
- First Prize: Mano a mano by Louise Courvoisier
- Second Prize: Hiêu by Richard Van
- Third Prize:
  - Ambience by Wisam Al Jafari
  - The Little Soul by Barbara Rupik

=== Honorary Palme d'Or ===
- Alain Delon

== Independent awards ==
=== FIPRESCI Prizes ===
- In Competition: It Must Be Heaven by Elia Suleiman
- Un Certain Regard: Beanpole by Kantemir Balagov
- Parallel section: The Lighthouse by Robert Eggers (Directors' Fortnight)

=== Prize of the Ecumenical Jury ===
- A Hidden Life by Terrence Malick

=== Critics' Week ===
- Nespresso Grand Prize: I Lost My Body by Jérémy Clapin
- Leitz Cine Discovery Prize for Short Film: She Runs by Qiu Yang
- Louis Roederer Foundation Rising Star Award: Ingvar Eggert Sigurðsson for A White, White Day
- Gan Foundation Award for Distribution: Vivarium by Lorcan Finnegan
- SACD Award: Our Mothers by César Díaz
- Canal+ Award for Short Film: Ikki Illa Meint by Andrias Høgenni

=== Directors' Fortnight ===
- Europa Cinemas Label Award for Best European Film: Alice and the Mayor by Nicolas Pariser
- SACD Award for Best French-language Film: An Easy Girl by Rebecca Zlotowski
- Illy Short Film Award: Stay Awake, Be Ready by Pham Thien An
- Carrosse d'Or: John Carpenter

=== L'Œil d'or ===
- For Sama by Waad Al-Kateab and Edward Watts
- The Cordillera of Dreams by Patricio Guzmán

=== Queer Palm ===
- Portrait of a Lady on Fire by Céline Sciamma
- Short Film Queer Palm: The Distance Between Us and the Sky by Vasilis Kekatos

=== François Chalais Prize ===
- A Hidden Life by Terrence Malick

=== Cannes Soundtrack Award ===
- Alberto Iglesias for Pain and Glory

=== CST Award for Best Artist-Technician ===
- Flora Volpelière (editing) and Julien Poupard (cinematography) for Les Misérables
  - Special Mention: Claire Mathon for Atlantics and Portrait of a Lady on Fire (cinematography)
- Artistic Direction Mention: Lee Ha-jun for Parasite

=== Palm Dog ===
- Palm Dog Award: Sayuri for Once Upon a Time in Hollywood
- Grand Jury Prize:
  - Canine cast in Little Joe
  - Canine cast in Aasha and the Street Dogs (Marché du Film)
- Palm DogManitarian Award: Google for their support of dogs in the workplace
- Underdog Award: The Unadoptable

=== Chopard Trophy ===
- François Civil and Florence Pugh

=== Pierre Angénieux Excellens in Cinematography ===
- Bruno Delbonnel
- Special Encouragement Award for promising cinematographer: Modhura Palit
