= Daphné Patakia =

Belgian-born Greek actress

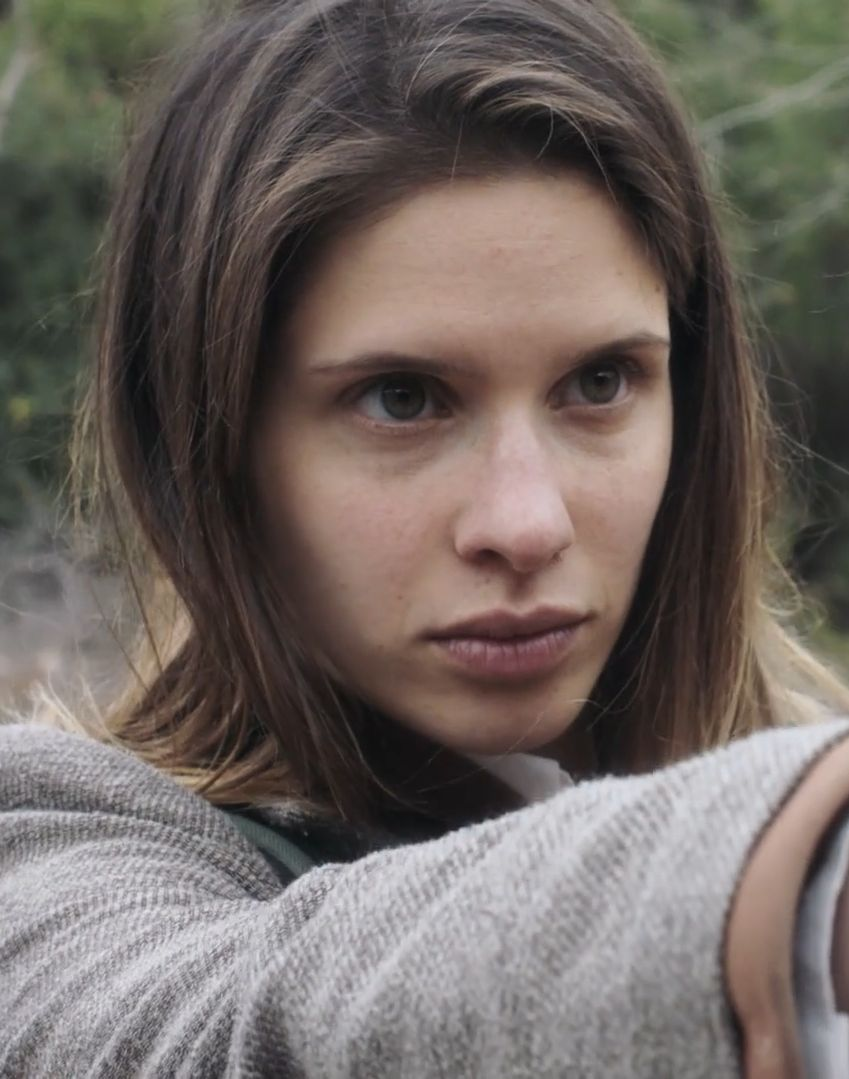
- Daphné Patakia in Djam (2017)
- Born: Daphne Ioakimidou-Patakia; 8 June 1992 (age 34); Brussels, Belgium
- Occupation: Actress

Daphné Patakia (Greek: Δάφνη Πατακιά; born 8 June 1992) is a Belgian-born Greek actress.

== Life ==
She was raised in Brussels, where she had been born to Greek parents. She then began her actress training at the National Theatre of Greece in Athens, graduating from there in 2013 and acting in a number of Greek films before moving to Paris and shifting to an international career.

In 2017 she and Maryne Cayon starred in the main roles in the film Djam, directed by Tony Gatlif. In 2021 she appeared in Paul Verhoeven's Benedetta alongside Virginie Efira, Charlotte Rampling and Lambert Wilson. The same year she gained one of the main roles in the French TV series OVNI(s).

== Filmography ==
=== Shorts ===
- 2015 : Akryliko, directed by Nikos Pastras : Myrto
- 2016 : 3000, directed by Antonis Tsonis : Daphné
- 2017 : Glister, directed by Vincent Tricon : Lucica
- 2019 : Nimic, directed by Yorgos Lanthimos : Mimic

=== Features ===
- 2015 : Interruption, directed by Yorgos Zois : fille de la troupe
- 2015 : L'Éveil du printemps (Το ξύπνημα της άνοιξης / Spring Awakening), directed by Constantínos Giánnaris : Ioanna
- 2016 : Nima, directed by Alexandros Voulgaris : la fille muette en roller
- 2017 : Rattrapage, directed by Tristan Séguéla : Mélanie
- 2017 : Djam, directed by Tony Gatlif : Djam
- 2018 : A Paris Education, directed by Jean-Paul Civeyrac : invitée à la soirée
- 2019 : Meltem, directed by Basile Doganis : Elena
- 2019 : Winona, directed by Alexander Voulgaris : Eiko
- 2021 : Benedetta, directed by Paul Verhoeven : Bartolomea
- 2021 : Tout le monde m'appelle Mike, directed by Guillaume Bonnier : Isotta
- 2021 : Les Cinq Diables, directed by Léa Mysius : Nadine
- 2025 : Chien 51, directed by Cédric Jimenez : Amel
- 2025 : Our Wildest Days, directed by Vasilis Kekatos, selected in the Generation 14plus section at the 75th Berlin International Film Festival, where it will have its world premiere in February 2025.
- 2026 : Quasimodo, l'âme de Paris

=== TV films ===
- 2020 : Paris-Brest, directed by Philippe Lioret : Élise

=== TV series ===
- 2018 : Versailles: Eleanor of Austria
- 2021–2022 : OVNI(s), directed by Antony Cordier : Véra Clouseau
