= Summer of Changsha =

2019 film

- Film poster
- Directed by: Zu Feng
- Written by: Zu Feng
- Release date: 22 May 2019 (Cannes)
- Running time: 116 minutes
- Country: China
- Language: Chinese

Summer of Changsha is a 2019 Chinese crime film directed by Zu Feng. It was screened in the Un Certain Regard section at the 2019 Cannes Film Festival. However, one day before the screening, the team of the film announced they would not be attending the festival due to "technical reasons".

== Reception ==
On the review aggregator website Rotten Tomatoes, 14% of 7 critics' reviews are positive, with an average rating of 4.5/10.
