= The Lighthouse (soundtrack) =

The Lighthouse (Original Motion Picture Soundtrack)

Film score by Mark Korven
- Released: October 18, 2019
- Recorded: 2019
- Genre: Film score
- Length: 36:22
- Label: Milan
- Producer: Mark Korven

Mark Korven chronology
In the Tall Grass (2019)	The Lighthouse (2019)	The Terror (2019)

The Lighthouse (Original Motion Picture Soundtrack) is the soundtrack to the 2019 film of the same name directed by Robert Eggers, starring Robert Pattinson and Willem Dafoe. The original score is composed by Canadian composer Mark Korven, whom had previously collaborated with Eggers on his debut film The Witch (2015). It consisted of aleatoric instrumentation that represents the sea and the nature being primarily used throughout the film, and devoid of a string-based score. The sonic palette of the film was derived from the mythology of the seas and oceans.

The soundtrack which consisted of thirteen Korven's original score was released by Milan Records digitally on October 18, 2019, followed by a physical release distributed by Sacred Bones Records in vinyl LPs. Korven received positive response from critics for his compositions and a nomination at the 2020 Fangoria Chainsaw Awards for Best Score.

== Development ==
Korven discussed with Eggers on nature serving the sonic inspiration and the world the characters inhabited. He further illustrated about "the mythology of the sea—mermaids, ancient myths, that sort of thing" and evoke in an aleatoric manner through textures and instrumentation. The soundtrack began with a minimalistic approach with a nod to sea shanties and ancient Greek music until the use of big brass section, which turned into a maximalist score.

He recalled the ton of material of classic horror scores such as Bernard Herrmann's Psycho (1960) and Jerry Goldsmith's Alien (1979) which influenced him. The playlist included ancient Greek conch shell music and 20th century compositions of Italian avant-garde composer Giacinto Scelsi, one of the forefathers of drone and minimalist music. He added:

"That was all left behind fairly quickly, though. I don’t like to reference the temp score too much. I was off doing my own thing as soon as I knew the basic vocabulary of what Rob was hearing. I don’t overintellectualize much, and neither does Rob, at least musically speaking. Which is kind of interesting because he intellectualizes everything else. But the music is a very unique world for him, and I think he wants to keep it fresher and more spontaneous."

Eggers wanted a soundtrack without strings as the score for The Witch was string-prominent (although some of the strings made into the final score). He wanted horns, pipes, conch shells and concertina and other materials that sounded like the sea, and the foghorn from the lighthouse stations. Some of the instruments included, cello, double bass, brass, percussion, woodwinds and instruments Korven had experimented, including glass harmonica, and "friction mallets" that have been dragged across wood, glass and cymbals. Korven had an Apprehension Engine (Note: a homemade electro-acoustic device which consists of rulers, coils, magnets and guitar necks arranged with pick-ups on a set of wooden boards) commissioned from his friend and luthier Tony Duggan-Smith, adding that "It's not music in the traditional sense at all, but the Apprehension Engine definitely evokes an emotion, so I would call it music".

The sound design was not done when the score was completed. Korven felt that if the process happened simultaneously, he would have written a different score to suit the sound design, although "it does create some interesting hybrid textures between sound and music". Korven recalled that the challenging scene to compose was that of the climax sequence as "there were so many layers of textures involved that finding exactly the right tone took a very long time" which felt as an exercise in "subtle blending of about twenty different moods, so that it sounded as one whole".

== Release ==
The soundtrack to the film was released on the same date as its theatrical premiere, on October 18, 2019. Milan Records distributed the soundtrack through digital platforms, while Sacred Bones Records published the vinyl LP records. Three editions of the soundtrack was released for the album, which consisted of three different colors: black, liquid gold and marble. The prices of the album range from $20 to $23.

== Track listing ==
No.	Title	Length
1.	"Arrival"	1:49
2.	"Sonovabitch"	3:32
3.	"Cistern / Old on Lens"	2:41
4.	"Swab Dog Swab / Seagull / Winslow's Story"	3:22
5.	"Curse Your Name / Dirty Weather"	3:48
6.	"Murder / Mermaid / Heavy Labour"	2:38
7.	"Stranded"	2:18
8.	"The Sea King's Fury"	2:59
9.	"Mermaid Lust / Stabbing the Charm"	2:35
10.	"Why'd Ya Spill Yer Beans?"	2:34
11.	"Filthy Dog"	3:21
12.	"The Light Belongs to Me"	1:13
13.	"Into the Light"	3:32
Total length:		36:22

== Reception ==
The Film Scorer wrote "The brilliance lies in how the various pieces tie together. The bulk of the score feels like a collage or soundscape, as Korven mixes strings, horns, and inhuman noises from his 'Apprehension Engine', which then mesh seamlessly with the film’s organic sound design of wind, waves, birds, creaking wood. It becomes a medley of madness, and all the while the Lighthouse calls for us to come ever closer and submit." Peter Bradshaw of The Guardian commented that Korven's score "ratchets up the tension ruthlessly". John Bleasdale of CineVue wrote that the music and sound design "thunder and rasp throughout".

David Rooney of The Hollywood Reporter wrote "Mark Korven’s nerve-jangling atonal score of brass, woodwinds and percussion mixes with the intricately layered soundscape of crashing waves and stinging wind, and foghorn blasts that might be mistaken for the cries of whales or the roars of sea monsters." Thomas Floyd of The Washington Post wrote "Mark Korven’s foreboding score — punctuated with blaring foghorns — sounds the alarm that something is amiss." Rory O'Connor of The Film Stage commented that Korven's score is "a mix of low strings and menacing, repetitious fog horns". "overly pervasive" and reminiscent of the score from Under the Skin (2013).

Nicholas Barber of BBC wrote that Korven's music "is not so much music as a deluge of unearthly throbs, squawks and groans, counterpointed by the cry of those pesky gulls and the deafening drone of the foghorn." David Sims of The Atlantic called Korven's score as "discordant".
