= The Light-House =

Short story by Edgar Allan Poe

"The Light-House" is the unofficial title of the last work written by Edgar Allan Poe. He did not live to finish it, and had barely begun it by the time of his death in 1849.

== Plot summary ==
The story is told as a series of diary entries, the first being New Year's Day, 1796. The setting is an island off the coast of Norway.

On January 1, the narrator records that it is his first day in the lighthouse, and records his annoyance at the fact that he had a difficult time getting the appointment to man it, even though he is of noble birth. He records that a storm is in progress, and that the ship that brought him "had a narrow escape". He also dwells on the concept of being alone, and how much he looks forward to spending time alone, just him and his dog Neptune, so he can write his book. He briefly comments that he hears some echo in the walls, thinking they may not be sturdy, but catches himself and claims that his worries are "all nonsense", alluding to a prophecy made by his friend De Grät, who got him the appointment to the lighthouse.

On January 2, he describes the sea as being calm and uneventful, the wind having "lulled about", and expounds on his passion for being alone.

On January 3, he describes the day as being calm and placid and resolves to explore the lighthouse. He again begins to worry about the safety of the structure but tries to reassure himself. The last line reads, "The basis on which the structure rests seems to me to be chalk..."

A heading for January 4 follows, but there is no text.

== Composition ==
Biographer Kenneth Silverman believes Poe began writing "The Light-House" between May and August 1849. The work was never officially titled.

It is uncertain how the story would have ended and there is some debate if "The Light-House" was intended as a short story or a novel. Silverman speculates that the work might have been complete in its two-page form and the final blank entry implied the narrator's death.

It is likely the last fiction work Poe wrote.

== Analysis ==
Themes of foreboding, isolation and paranoia are apparent in "The Light-House".

Its style is very straightforward and plainspoken, in contrast to the more elaborate and decorated prose of Poe's earlier stories, implying a shift in Poe's writing style which the author did not live to realize.

Like many of Poe's works, "The Light-House" has been studied autobiographically. The lighthouse keeper, then, stands in for Poe himself, who is expressing his own feelings of being alone and isolated and questioning if he can survive.

It is very similar in theme to the later and also unfinished short story "The Burrow" by Franz Kafka. Both involve a reclusive narrator who obsesses over the safety of his enclosure, though Kafka's work was much closer to completion and, consequentially, much more elaborate. Given the obscurity of Poe's story, it is very unlikely that Kafka had read it.

== Inspiration ==
Author and surgeon Dr. Richard Selzer included his short story 'Poe's Light-house', inspired by Edgar Allan Poe's 'The Light-House', in 'The Doctor Stories', published by Picador. Joyce Carol Oates also used Poe's "The Light-House" as an inspiration for the story 'Poe Posthumous, or The Light-House' in her collection Wild Nights! (2008). Leigh M. Lane's Finding Poe (2012) speculates the role Poe's own works, including "The Lighthouse", may have played in his mysterious death. The story also served as inspiration for Max Eggers to develop the idea of what, following his brother, Robert Eggers' involvement, became The Lighthouse (2019).

== Adaptations ==
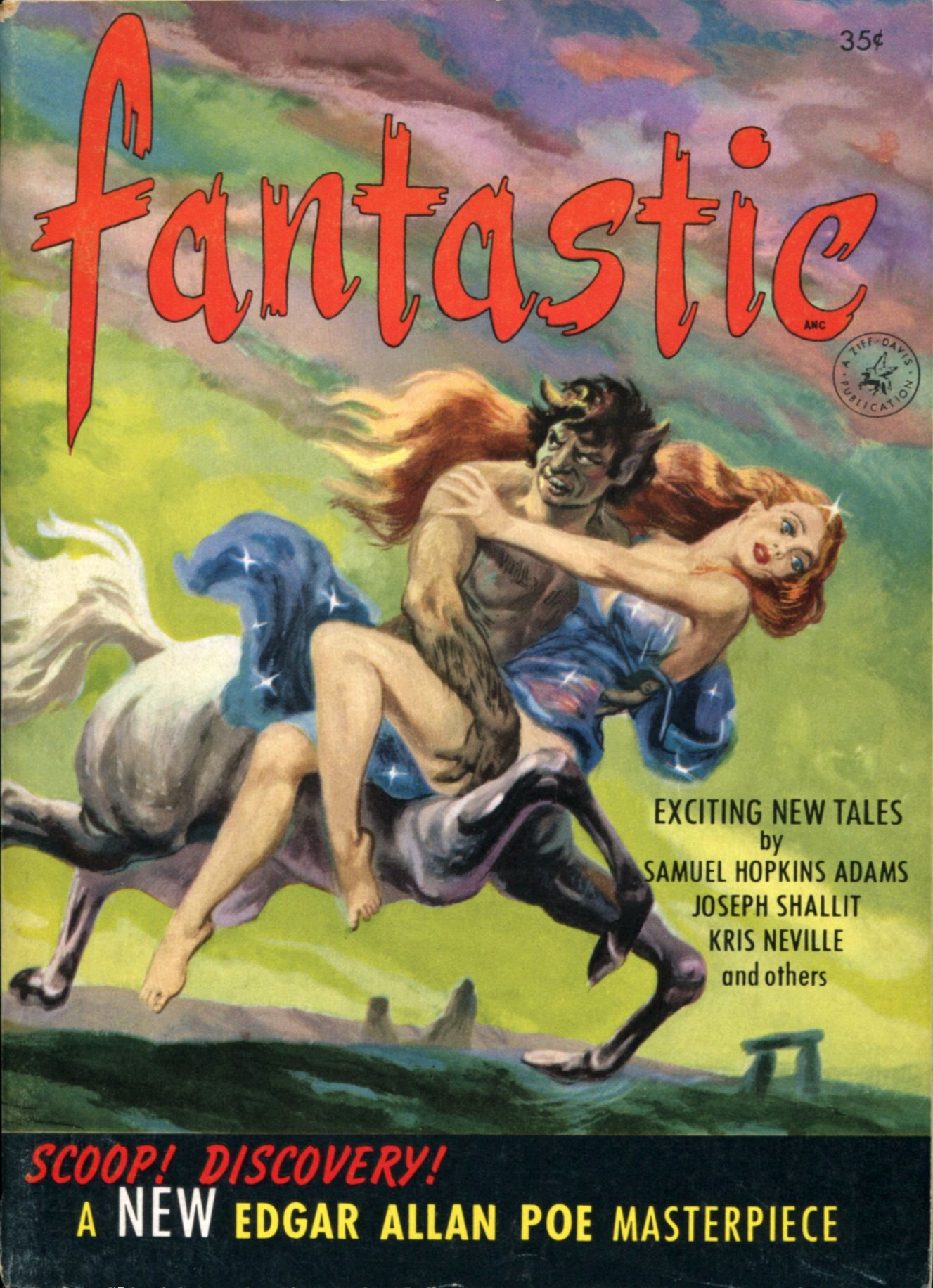
Fantastic published Robert Bloch's story based on the Poe fragment as "A New Edgar Allan Poe Masterpiece".

At the request of Poe scholar Thomas Ollive Mabbott, author Robert Bloch finished Poe's tale and published it in the January/February 1953 Ziff-Davis publication Fantastic (entitled "The Lighthouse", as by Poe and Bloch). Bloch's completion was later published in the February 1969 issue (#53) of Famous Monsters of Filmland as "Horror in the Lighthouse".

In addition to Bloch's adaptation of "The Light-House", in the TV series The Following, fictional psychopath and serial killer Joe Carroll (played by James Purefoy) writes a novel inspired by Poe's tale, titling it The Gothic Sea.

In 1997, Ediciones Áltera commissioned a number of Spanish and Latin American writers to complete the story, each in their own manner. They included Cristina Fernández Cubas, whose version is included in her anthology Todos los cuentos (Tusquets editores, 2008).

A 2016 film, Edgar Allan Poe‘s Lighthouse Keeper, was loosely based on the story. While themes of isolation and unease in the building were preserved, the film took inspiration from Roger Corman's Poe adaptations from the 1960s.

According to Robert Eggers, although the final story bears little resemblance to the Poe fragment, his 2019 film The Lighthouse began as an attempt by his brother Max Eggers to do a contemporary take on the Poe story. When the project stalled, Robert offered to work with his brother and the project evolved into a period thriller with the Poe elements removed.
