= Ghost Tropic (film) =

2019 film

- Film poster
- Directed by: Bas Devos
- Written by: Bas Devos
- Starring: Maaike Neuville; Nora Dari; Saadia Bentaïeb; Stefan Gota; Cédric Luvuezo
- Cinematography: Grimm Vandekerckhove
- Edited by: Dieter Diependaele
- Music by: Brecht Ameel
- Production companies: Quetzalcoatl; 10.80 films Minds Meet
- Release date: 23 May 2019 (Cannes)
- Running time: 85 minutes
- Country: Belgium
- Language: French

Ghost Tropic is a 2019 Belgian drama film directed by Bas Devos. It was screened in the Directors' Fortnight section at the 2019 Cannes Film Festival.

== Plot ==
A woman falls asleep on the subway. Arriving at the end of the line, there are no more trains running and she decides to make the long walk home on foot. A journey through the city of Brussels leads to a series of nocturnal encounters.

== Cast ==
- Saadia Bentaïeb as Khadija
- Maaike Neuville as a gas station clerk
- Nora Dari as Khadija's daughter
- Stefan Gota as a security guard
- Cédric Luvuezo as a medic
