= Once in Trubchevsk =

2019 film

- Film poster
- Однажды в Трубчевске
- Directed by: Larisa Sadilova
- Written by: Larisa Sadilova
- Produced by: Larisa Schneidermann
- Starring: Kristii Schneider; Egor Barinov; Yuri Kiselev; Mariya Semyonova
- Cinematography: Anatoly Petriga
- Edited by: Gleb Dragayetsev
- Production companies: Shim Film; Arsi Film
- Release date: May 2019 (Cannes)
- Running time: 90 minutes
- Country: Russia
- Language: Russian

Once in Trubchevsk is a 2019 Russian drama film directed by Larisa Sadilova. It was screened in the Un Certain Regard section at the 2019 Cannes Film Festival.
