= For the Money =

2019 film

- Film poster
- Spanish: Por el dinero
- Directed by: Alejo Moguillansky
- Written by: Alejo Moguillansky; Luciana Acuña; Walter Jakob
- Cinematography: Inés Duacastella
- Edited by: Alejo Moguillansky; Walter Jakob; Mariano Llinás
- Music by: Gabriel Chwojnik
- Production company: El Pampero Cine
- Distributed by: ARP Sélection
- Release date: 21 May 2019 (Cannes)
- Running time: 79 minutes
- Country: Argentina
- Language: Spanish

For the Money (Spanish: Por el dinero) is a 2019 Argentine drama film directed by Alejo Moguillansky. It was screened in the Directors' Fortnight section at the 2019 Cannes Film Festival. Later that year, it competed at the Latin American Competition of the 34th Mar del Plata International Film Festival.

== Cast ==
- Alejo Moguillansky
- Gabriel Chwojnik
- Luciana Acuña
- Matthieu Perpoint
