= Lurk (TV series) =

2008 Chinese television series

- Title screen
- Genre: Spy; Thriller
- Based on: Lurk by Long Yi
- Written by: Jiang Wei
- Directed by: Jiang Wei
- Starring: Sun Honglei; Yao Chen; Shen Aojun; Zu Feng; Feng Enhe; Wu Gang
- Opening theme: Deep Sea by China Philharmonic Orchestra
- Country of origin: China
- Original language: Mandarin
- No. of episodes: 30

Production
- Producer: Zhang Jing
- Running time: 45 minutes per episode
- Production company: Guangdong Southern Television Station

Original release
- Network: Dragon TV; Chongqing Television; Beijing TV; Heilongjiang TV
- Release: 20 December 2008

Lurk
- Traditional Chinese: 潛伏
- Simplified Chinese: 潜伏
Transcriptions
Standard Mandarin
- Hanyu Pinyin: Qiǎnfú

Lurk (Chinese: 潜伏) is a 2008 Chinese television series based on Long Yi's spy novel of the same name. A Republican-era espionage drama directed by Jiang Wei and Fu Wei, starring Sun Honglei, Yao Chen, Zu Feng, Feng Enhe, Shen Aojun, Wu Gang, and others. It mainly tells the story of Yu Zecheng, an officer in the Intelligence Department of the Nationalist Military Bureau of Investigation and Statistics, who defects to the Communist underground and becomes a spy embedded within the bureau in early 1945.

It premiered on Southern Television on December 20, 2008. At the end of 2008, Lurk was broadcast on local channels in Tianjin, Shandong, Chengdu, and other regions. On April 1, 2009, Lurk was broadcast nationwide on satellite channels including Heilongjiang Satellite TV, Dragon TV (Eastern Satellite TV), Beijing Satellite TV, and Chongqing Satellite TV. On its premiere day, Beijing Satellite TV achieved a viewership rating of 8.01%.

== Synopsis ==
The story takes place after 1946, during the Chinese civil war after the Japanese surrender.

An underground worker for the Communist Party, Yu Zecheng (Sun Honglei), is an undetected spy within the Kuomintang (KMT) secret service. He has to keep his distance from his true love, Zuo Lan, in order to conceal his real identity and enters a false marriage with Wang Cuiping (Yao Chen), a quick-tempered but straightforward guerrilla fighter from the countryside. The two collaborate closely to obtain important information from the KMT for the Communist Party. Despite often finding themselves at odds with each other, their connection gradually deepened.

With Liberation Day impending, Cuiping, threatened by exposure of her secret identity, is asked to be transported elsewhere for security reasons, leaving Yu. When Yu is also about to leave, after successfully obtaining a crucial name list, he is taken away by the KMT secret police on a secret service assignment to Taiwan, where he has to spend the rest of his life, lurking.

== Cast ==
- Sun Honglei as Yu Zecheng
- Yao Chen as Wang Cuiping
- Shen Aojun 沈傲君 as Zuo Lan
- Zu Feng as Li Ya
- Feng Enhe 冯恩鹤 as Wu Jingzhong
- Wu Gang 吴刚 as Lu Qiaoshan
- Fan Yulin 范雨林 as Ma Kui
- Wang Xiaoyi 王小毅 as Liao Sanmin
- Zhu Jie 朱杰 as Mu Wanqiu
- Cao Bingkun 曹炳琨 as Xie Ruolin
- Ma Junqin 马军勤 as Mrs. Wu
- Liu Changwei 刘昌伟 as Manager Qiu
- Lu Yu 陆羽 as Manager Luo
- Shi Wenzhong 石文忠 as Li Haifeng
- Sun Lan 孙岚 as Xu Baofeng
- Xu Jingling 徐婧灵 as Mrs. Ma
- Bian Tao 卞涛 as Lv Zongfang
- Zhang Guoqing 张国庆 as Mu Liancheng
- Zhou Bowen 周博文 as Long Er
- Liu Yanyu 刘言语 as Secretary Hong
- Cui Song 崔嵩 as Wang Zhanjing
- Yao Gang 姚刚 as Dai Li
- He Bo 何波 as Zhou Yafu
- Ji Shi Guang 吉世光 as Sheng Xiang
- Ren Xue Hai 任雪海 as Mr. Ye
- Xu Tao 徐涛 as narrator

== Behind-the-Scenes Production ==
=== Scriptwriting ===
The original novel Lurk was less than 20,000 characters long. Jiang Wei spent 10 months adapting it into a 30-episode television drama script. During the creation process, Jiang Wei also put a lot of effort into making the drama stand out. He added many light-hearted and humorous elements to the tense and thrilling espionage story, aiming to give the series a unique character.

== Reception ==
Lurk was a critical and commercial hit. Viewers praised its storyline and character development, and consider the show a departure from other spy stories seen on Chinese television and movies. The series was rated highly, and was called "a milestone in Chinese television productions".

Lurk's central theme is faith, blending elements of humor, romance, suspense, and mental battles. It focuses on portraying the struggles and sacrifices of underground agents during a special historical period.

Besides the lauded performance of the main characters, the supporting roles also received appraisal: the cunning Station Chief Wu, the brave Ma Kui, the sinister and petty Lu Qiaoshan, and the ruthless Li Ya.

== Awards and nominations ==
Year	Award	Category	Nominee	Result	ref.
2009	27th Flying Apsaras Awards	Outstanding Television Drama	Lurk	Won	
2009	27th Flying Apsaras Awards	Outstanding Actor	Sun Honglei	Won	
2009	27th Flying Apsaras Awards	Outstanding Actress	Yao Chen	Nominated	
2009	27th Flying Apsaras Awards	Outstanding Screenwriter	Jiang Wei	Won	
2009	27th Flying Apsaras Awards	Outstanding Editing	Lurk	Won	
2009	15th Magnolia Awards	Best Television Series	Lurk	Won	
2009	15th Magnolia Awards	Best Director	Jiang Wei	Nominated	
2009	15th Magnolia Awards	Best Writer	Jiang Wei	Nominated	
2009	15th Magnolia Awards	Best Actor	Sun Honglei	Won	
2010	25th Golden Eagle Awards	Best Television Series	Lurk	Won	
2010	25th Golden Eagle Awards	Best Screenwriter	Jiang Wei	Won	
2010	25th Golden Eagle Awards	Best Actor	Sun Honglei	Won	
2010	25th Golden Eagle Awards	Most Popular Actor	Sun Honglei	Won	
2010	25th Golden Eagle Awards	Audience's Choice for Actor	Sun Honglei	Won	
2010	25th Golden Eagle Awards	Audience's Choice for Actress	Yao Chen	Won	
2010	4th Huading Awards	Best Drama	Lurk	Won	
2010	4th Huading Awards	Best Actor	Sun Honglei	Won	
2010	4th Huading Awards	Best Actress	Yao Chen	Won	
2010	4th Huading Awards	Best Supporting Actor	Zu Feng	Won	

== Lurk Spy Museum ==
A museum has been established in Tianjin, where the script was based on. In Da Li Dao 57, guests are welcome to come and see Wang Tian Mu's old residence, which is now a private owned museum as well as a restaurant. Many of the objects used in the TV series can be seen there, and it is possible to have Tianjin's local historian to come and talk about the house, the area and the city. Some of the scenes in the TV series were also taken in this place.
