= Blow It to Bits =

2019 film

- Film poster
- French: On va tout péter
- Directed by: Lech Kowalski
- Written by: Lech Kowalski
- Cinematography: Lech Kowalski
- Edited by: Lech Kowalski; Odile Allard
- Music by: Sal Bernardi
- Production company: Revolt Cinéma
- Distributed by: Revolt Cinéma
- Release date: 16 May 2019 (Cannes)
- Running time: 109 minutes
- Country: France
- Language: French

Blow It to Bits (French: On va tout péter) is a 2019 French drama film directed by Lech Kowalski. It was screened in the Directors' Fortnight section at the 2019 Cannes Film Festival.

== Production ==
Filming took place in La Souterraine, in the Creuse department.
