= The Distance Between Us and the Sky =

2019 short film

- Directed by: Vasilis Kekatos
- Written by: Vasilis Kekatos
- Produced by: Eleni Kossyfidou; Delphine Schmit; Guillaume Dreyfus
- Starring: Nikos Zeginoglou; Ioko Ioannis Kotidis
- Cinematography: Giorgos Valsamis
- Edited by: Stamos Dimitropoulos
- Production companies: Blackbird Production; Tripode Productions
- Distributed by: Shortcuts
- Release date: 24 May 2019 (Cannes)
- Running time: 9 minutes
- Countries: Greece; France
- Language: Greek

The Distance Between Us and the Sky is a 2019 Greek-French short film written and directed by Vasilis Kekatos.

The film won the Short Film Palme d'Or at the 2019 Cannes Film Festival.

== Plot ==
Two unnamed strangers (played by Nikos Zeginoglou and Ioko Ioannis Kotidis) meet for the first time at an old petrol station. One has stopped to fill up his motorcycle, while the other is just stranded. Lacking the €22.50 he needs to get home, the stranded stranger tries to "sell" the other stranger the distance that separates them from the sky.

== Cast ==
- Nikos Zeginoglou as Boy 1
- Ioko Ioannis Kotidis as Boy 2

== Reception ==
The film was awarded the Short Film Palme d'Or at the 2019 Cannes Film Festival. It also won the Short Film Queer Palm.
