= Sofía Quirós Ubeda =

- Born: July 4, 1989; Buenos Aires
- Occupation: Film director

Sofía Quirós Ubeda (born July 4, 1989) is a Costa Rican film director.

Sofía Quirós Ubeda was born on July 4, 1989 in Buenos Aires, Argentina and grew up in Costa Rica. She studied at the University of Buenos Aires.

She expanded her short film Selva (2017) into the feature film Ceniza Negra/Land of Ashes (2019). In both films, Smashleen Gutiérrez plays Selva, a 13-year-old girl living in a coastal town with her grandfather Tata (Humberto Samuels). Selva feels more at home in the jungle. Selva was screened at the 2017 Cannes Film Festival and Land of Ashes at the 2019 Cannes Film Festival. They were the first short film and first feature film from Costa Rica to be featured at Cannes. Land of Ashes was Costa Rica's submission for the Academy Award for Best International Feature Film.

She is working on her second feature-length film, Madre Pájaro.

== Filmography ==
- Al otro Lado/The Other Side (short film) (2011)
- Entre la Tierra/Inside Land (short film) (2015)
- Selva (short film) (2017)
- Ceniza Negra/Land of Ashes (2019)
- El silencio de los niños (short film) (2022)
