= Land of Ashes =

2019 film

- Film poster
- Directed by: Sofía Quirós Ubeda
- Starring: Smashleen Gutiérrez
- Release date: 19 May 2019 (Cannes)
- Running time: 82 minutes
- Country: Costa Rica
- Language: Spanish

Land of Ashes (Spanish: Ceniza negra) is a 2019 Costa Rican drama film directed by Sofía Quirós Ubeda. It was selected as the Costa Rican entry for the Best International Feature Film at the 93rd Academy Awards, but it was not nominated.

== Plot ==
Following the disappearance of her mother, a 13-year-old girl is left to look after her grandfather.

== Cast ==
- Smashleen Gutiérrez as Selva
- Humberto Samuels as Tata
- Hortensia Smith as Elena
- Keha Brown as Winter

== See also ==
- List of submissions to the 93rd Academy Awards for Best International Feature Film
- List of Costa Rican submissions for the Academy Award for Best International Feature Film
