= Our Wildest Days =

2025 Greek film

- Promotional poster
- Greek: Οι άγριες μέρες μας
- Literally: I agries meres mas
- French: Nos Jours Sauvages
- Directed by: Vasilis Kekatos
- Written by: Vasilis Kekatos
- Produced by: Eleni Kossyfidou; Delphine Schmit; Julie Esparbes; Guillaume Dreyfus; Jamila Wenske
- Starring: Daphné Patakia; Nikolakis Zegkinoglou; Stavros Tsoumanis; Popi Semerlioglou; Natalia Swift; Ioko Kotidis; Eva Samioti; Emmanuel Elozieuwa
- Cinematography: Giorgos Valsamis
- Edited by: Lambis Charalambidis
- Music by: Kostis Maraveyas
- Production companies: Blackbird productions; Incognita Films; Achtung Panda; Hélicotronc
- Distributed by: Condor Films; Kinology; Cinobo
- Release date: 15 February 2025 (Berlinale)
- Running time: 90 minutes
- Countries: Greece; France; Belgium; Germany
- Language: Greek

Our Wildest Days (Greek: Οι άγριες μέρες μας) is a 2025 drama film directed by Vasilis Kekatos in his debut feature. The film follows Chloe, who leaves her family behind and joins a group of teenagers crossing Greece.

A co-production of Greece, and France, the film was selected in the Generation 14plus section at the 75th Berlin International Film Festival, where it had its world premiere on 15 February 2025.

== Synopsis ==
At 20, Chloe leaves her troubled family to join a group of idealistic outsiders, dedicating herself to helping society's neglected. Traveling through a fragmented Greece, she explores dreams, love, and freedom, ultimately learning that true rebellion often brings isolation.

== Cast ==
- Daphné Patakia as Chloé
- Nikolakis Zegkinoglou as Aris
- Stavros Tsoumanis as Piotr
- Popi Semerlioglou as Sissy
- Natalia Swift as Anna
- Ioko Kotidis as Loukas
- Eva Samioti as Sofia
- Emmanuel Elozieuwa as Kosmas

== Production ==
Principal photography began on 3 July 2023 on locations in Greece. Filming ended on 2 September 2023 in Greece.

== Release ==
Our Wildest Days had its World premiere on 15 February 2025, as part of the 75th Berlin International Film Festival, in Generation 14plus.

== Accolades ==
Award	Date	Category	Recipient	Result	Ref.
Berlin International Film Festival	23 February 2025	Crystal Bear for Best Film	Vasilis Kekatos	Nominated	
