= Vasilis Kekatos =

Greek film director and screenwriter

Vasilis Kekatos is a Greek film director and screenwriter. He is most noted for his 2019 short film The Distance Between Us and the Sky, which was the winner of the Short Film Palme d'Or at the 2019 Cannes Film Festival.

He previously directed the short films Retrograde, Zero Star Hotel and The Silence of the Dying Fish.

The Distance Between Us and the Sky, a gay-themed film, was also the winner of the Queer Palm for LGBTQ-related short films. Kekatos dedicated his Palme d'Or win to the memory of his uncle, a gay man who emigrated from Greece to Australia in youth and whom Kekatos credited with having influenced his own attitudes toward homosexuality.

In 2021, he entered production on Milky Way, a teen drama television series. The series, centring on the tribulations facing a teenage girl who gets pregnant, premiered in 2023.

In 2024, he was one of four industry figures whose selection for the Greek committee to select the country's submission to the Academy Award for Best International Feature Film was rescinded a few days after it was announced.

In 2023, he received production funding from Eurimages for his debut feature film, Our Wildest Days (I Agries Meres Mas). The film was selected in the Generation 14plus section at the 75th Berlin International Film Festival, where it had its world premiere in February 2025.
