= Zu Feng =

Chinese actor and director (born 1974)

- 祖峰
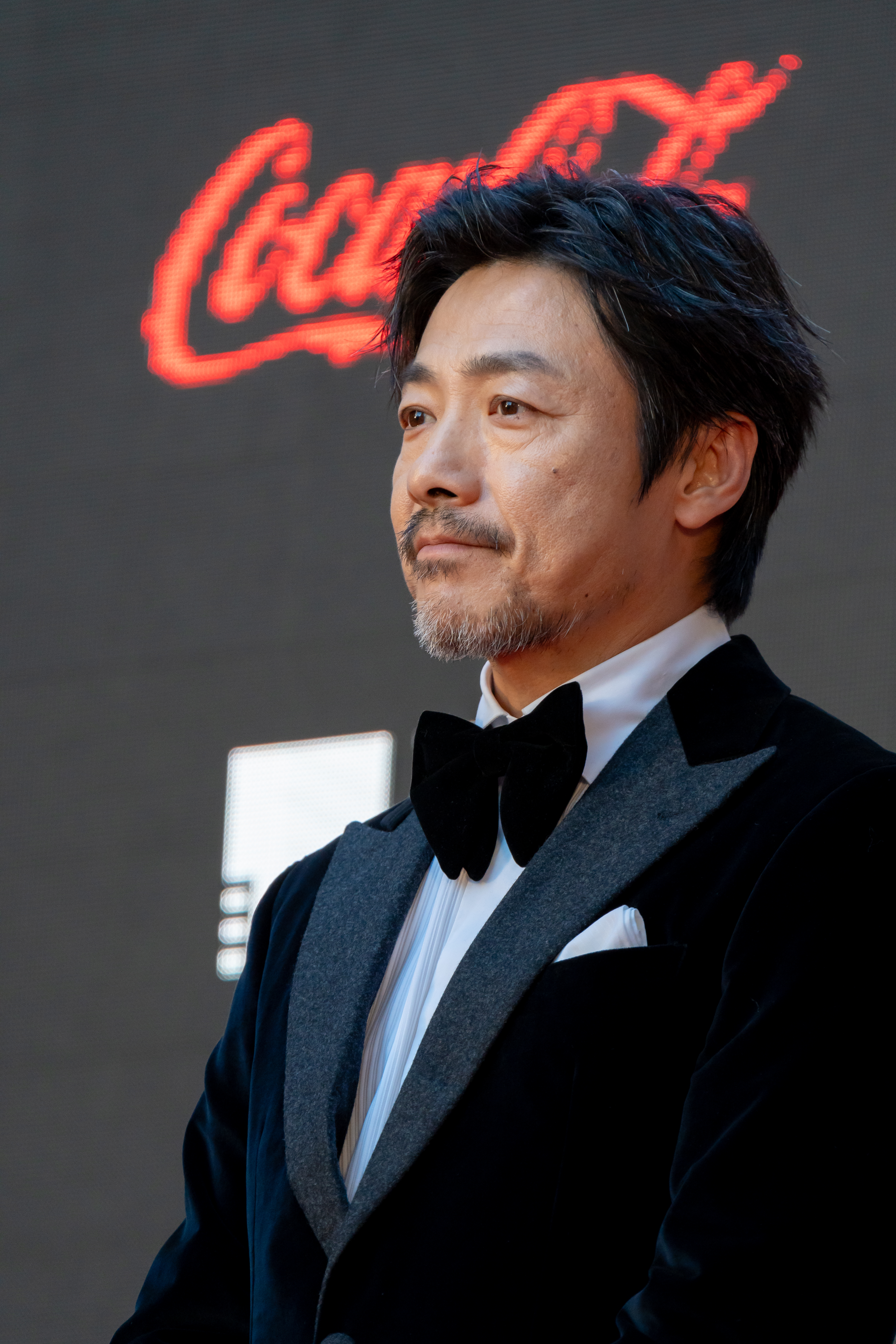
- Zu in 2023
- Born: February 23, 1974 (age 52); Nanjing, Jiangsu, China
- Education: Beijing Film Academy (MFA Master)
- Occupations: Actor, Director
- Years active: 1997–present
- Agent: Beijing Junwei Cultural Diffusion Limited Company
- Spouse: Liu Tianchi (m. 2010)

Zu Feng (Chinese: 祖峰; pinyin: Zǔ Fēng; born February 23, 1974) is a Chinese actor and director. Zu first attracted attention in 2008 for his role as Li Ya in the successful TV drama Lurk. He has earned and been nominated for numerous awards during his career, including winning the Best New Actor Award at the 2011 Chinese Young Generation Film Forum for his role in The Founding of a Party, Society Awardat the Golden Phoenix Awards, and two Huading Award for Best Supporting Actor.

== Early life ==
Zu was born and raised in Nanjing, Jiangsu. He attended Jinling High School there. In 1991, Zu worked in Nanjing Automobile Factory. Zu enrolled in the Beijing Film Academy in 1996. He teaches there after graduation in 2000–2006.

== Acting career ==
In 1999, Zu made his film debut in Lu Town Legend, when he was still a student at Beijing Film Academy. While he was teaching at Beijing Film Academy he also appeared in many television series, such as The Highland Troop, The Silent Witness and Shajiabang. In 2008, Zu won the Best Supporting Actor Award at the Huading Award for his performance in Lurk.

In 2011, Zu had a cameo appearance in The Founding of a Party, which earned him Best New Actor Award at the 2011 Chinese Young Generation Film Forum. He also won the Best Supporting Actor Award for his performance in Cheongsam. In 2014, Zu co-starred with Chen Daoming and Gong Li in Coming Home, directed by Zhang Yimou and written by Yan Geling and Zou Jingzhi.

== Personal life ==
In May 2010, Zu married Liu Tianchi (刘天池; 劉天池), a teacher at Central Academy of Drama.

== Filmography ==
=== Film ===
| Year | English title | Chinese title | Role | Notes |
|---|---|---|---|---|
| 2000 | | 越野飞车 | | |
| 2001 | Lu Town Legend | 鲁镇传说 | Ding Jiachang | |
| 2001 | | 落网黑客 | Luo Wen | |
| 2001 | | 十面埋伏 | Tang Yingzeng | |
| 2008 | Applause | 掌声响亮 | Chang Ji | Director |
| 2008 | | 轮椅上的奇迹 | Xu Feng | Director |
| 2009 | Precious Secret | 宝贵的秘密 | Lan Baogui | |
| 2011 | | 天上的伙伴 | Lu Xiaohe's father | |
| 2011 | Reviving of Beichuan | 北川重生 | Song Geng | |
| 2011 | The Founding of a Party | 建党伟业 | Deng Zhongxia | |
| 2012 | Black Fish | 黑鱼 | Qingpi | |
| 2012 | Mystery | 浮城谜事 | Tong Mingsong | |
| 2014 | Coming Home | 归来 | Deng instructor | |
| 2014 | The Golden Era | 黄金时代 | Luo Feng | |
| 2016 | Beijing Meets Seattle II: Book of Love | 北京遇上西雅图之不二情书 | Poet | |
| 2016 | League of Gods | 封神榜 | Ji Chang | |
| 2017 | Extraordinary Mission | 非凡任务 | Luo Dongfeng | |
| 2018 | Forever Young | 无问西东 | Mei Yiqi | |
| 2019 | Summer of Changsha | 六欲天 | Ah Bin | also as director |
| 2019 | Remain Silent | 保持沉默 | Tian Jingcheng | |
| 2021 | 1921 | 1921 | Dong Biwu | |
| 2021 | Upcoming Summer | 盛夏未来 | Uncle Wang | |
| 2021 | My Country, My Parents | 我和我的父辈 | Zhao Xiaodong | |
| 2024 | Brief History of a Family | 家庭简史 | Lin Jianjie | Wei's father |
| 2026 | Per Aspera Ad Astra | 星河入梦 | | |
| 2026 | The Embers | 我们仅有一次的人生 | | |

=== Television series ===
| Year | English title | Chinese title | Role | Notes |
|---|---|---|---|---|
| 1997 | Pan Hannian | 潘汉年 | Secretary of the Communist Party of Japan | |
| 1999 | Red Rock | 红岩 | Chen Songling | |
| 2004 | The Highland Troop | 高原骑兵连 | Xu Liping | |
| 2004 | The Diary Of Death | 沉默的证人 | Shi Yin | |
| 2006 | Shajiabang | 沙家浜 | Lieutenant Liu | |
| 2007 | Warm | 温暖 | Yan Xiaoguo | |
| 2009 | Lurk | 潜伏 | Li Ya | |
| 2009 | Secret War | 密战 | Hu Feng | |
| 2010 | Invisible General | 隐形将军 | Han Kui | |
| 2010 | Golden Wedding | 金婚·风雨情 | Ji Cheng | |
| 2011 | Cheongsam | 旗袍 | Zhao Shijie | |
| 2012 | Fashion Girl Editor | 时尚女编辑 | Ai Chongwen | |
| 2013 | Lone Wolf | 独狼 | Lin Jiesen | |
| 2014 | All Quiet In Peking | 北平无战事 | Cui Zhongshi | |
| 2014 | War of Marriage | 婚战 | Meng Sanli | |
| 2015 | Interpol Captain | 刑警队长 | Hu Dejiang | |
| 2015 | Graduation Song | 毕业歌 | Ji Jiaming | |
| 2015 | The Legend of Mi Yue | 芈月传 | Qu Yuan | |
| 2016 | | 我和她的传奇情仇 | Yuxin Ting | |
| 2016 | Ode to Joy | 欢乐颂 | Qi Dian | |
| 2016 | Code Name | 代号 | Zhou Xiaocun | |
| 2016 | Double Thorn | 双刺 | Peng Gang | |
| 2017 | Ode to Joy 2 | 欢乐颂2 | Qi Dian | Cameo |
| 2017 | Game of Hunting | 猎场 | Bai Liqin | Cameo |
| 2018 | The Mask | 面具 | Li Chunqiu | |
| 2019 | For the Holy Guiguzi | 谋圣鬼谷子 | Jian Yu | |
| 2021 | Mining Town | 闽宁镇 | Bai Chongli | |

== Awards and nominations ==
| Year | Award | Category | Nominated work | Result | Notes |
|---|---|---|---|---|---|
| 2009 | 15th Shanghai Television Festival | Most Popular Actor | Lurk | Won | |
| 2010 | 4th Huading Awards | Best Supporting Actor | Lurk | Won | |
| 2011 | 5th Huading Awards | Best Supporting Actor | Cheongsam | Won | |
| 2011 | 13th Golden Phoenix Awards | Performance Society Award | —N/a | Won | |
| 2011 | 6th Chinese Young Generation Film Forum | Best New Actor | The Founding of a Party | Won | |
| 2012 | 12th Pingyao International Photography Festival | Short Film Award - Best Actor | Black Fish | Won | |
| 2018 | 24th Huading Awards | Best Actor (Period Drama) | The Mask | Nominated | |
| 2019 | 25th Shanghai Television Festival | Best Actor | The Mask | Nominated | |
