= 25th Lumière Awards =

2020 French film awards ceremony

- Date: 27 January 2020
- Site: Olympia, Paris, France
- Hosted by: Isabelle Giordano

Highlights
- Most awards: Les Misérables (3)
- Most nominations: Les Misérables (7)

The 25th Lumière Awards ceremony, presented by the Académie des Lumières, took place on 27 January 2020 to honour the best in French films of 2019. It was broadcast for the first time on Canal +.

== Nominees ==
Best Film Les Misérables - Ladj Ly: By the Grace of God - François Ozon; An Officer and a Spy - Roman Polanski; Portrait of a Lady on Fire - Céline Sciamma; Oh Mercy! - Arnaud Desplechin	Best Director Roman Polanski — An Officer and a Spy: Jérémy Clapin — I Lost My Body; Arnaud Desplechin — Oh Mercy!; Ladj Ly — Les Misérables; Céline Sciamma — Portrait of a Lady on Fire
Best Actor Roschdy Zem — Oh Mercy!: Swann Arlaud — By the Grace of God; Daniel Auteuil — La Belle Époque; Jean Dujardin — An Officer and a Spy; Fabrice Luchini — Alice and the Mayor	Best Actress Noémie Merlant — Portrait of a Lady on Fire: Fanny Ardant — La Belle Époque; Anaïs Demoustier — Alice and the Mayor; Eva Green — Proxima; Karin Viard — Chanson douce
Best Male Revelation Alexis Manenti — Les Misérables: Thomas Daloz — Particles; Tom Mercier — Synonyms; Issa Perica — Les Misérables; Thimotée Robart — Vif-Argent	Best Female Revelation Nina Meurisse — Camille: Céleste Brunnquell — The Dazzled; Mina Farid — An Easy Girl; Lise Leplat Prudhomme — Joan of Arc; Mame Bineta Sane — Atlantics
Best First Film The Mustang - Laure de Clermont-Tonnerre: Atlantics - Mati Diop; Une intime conviction - Antoine Raimbault; Les Misérables - Ladj Ly; Perdrix - Erwan Le Duc	Best Screenplay Les Misérables — Ladj Ly, Giordano Gederlini and Alexis Manenti: La Belle Époque — Nicolas Bedos; By the Grace of God — François Ozon; Alice and the Mayor — Nicolas Pariser; An Officer and a Spy — Robert Harris and Roman Polanski
Best Cinematography Claire Mathon — Portrait of a Lady on Fire: Manuel Dacosse — By the Grace of God; Paweł Edelman — An Officer and a Spy; Irina Lubtchansky — Oh Mercy!; Julien Poupard — Les Misérables	Best Music Alexandre Desplat — Adults in the Room: Fatima Al Qadiri — Atlantics; Christophe — Joan of Arc; Evgueni and Sacha Galperine — By the Grace of God; Dan Levy — I Lost My Body
Best Documentary M - Yolande Zauberman: 68, mon père et les clous - Samuel Bigiaoui; Just Don't Think I'll Scream - Frank Beauvais; Living and Knowing You're Alive - Alain Cavalier; Lourdes - Thierry Demaizière and Alban Teurlai	Best Animated Film I Lost My Body - Jérémy Clapin: The Bears' Famous Invasion of Sicily - Lorenzo Mattotti; Funan - Denis Do; The Swallows of Kabul - Zabou Breitman and Eléa Gobé Mévellec; Wardi - Mats Grorud
Best International Co-Production It Must Be Heaven - Elia Suleiman: Bacurau - Kleber Mendonça Filho and Juliano Dornelles; Young Ahmed - Dardenne brothers; Lola - Laurent Micheli; Papicha - Mounia Meddour	Honorary Award: Costa-Gavras; Roberto Benigni

== See also ==
- 45th César Awards
- 10th Magritte Awards
