= 45th César Awards =

Awards ceremony

- Official poster featuring a photo of actress Anna Karina, taken by Georges Dambier in 1959
- Date: 28 February 2020
- Site: Salle Pleyel, Paris
- Hosted by: Florence Foresti

Highlights
- Best Film: Les Misérables
- Best Actor: Roschdy Zem; Oh Mercy!
- Best Actress: Anaïs Demoustier; Alice and the Mayor
- Most awards: Les Misérables (4)
- Most nominations: An Officer and a Spy (12)

Television coverage
- Network: Canal+

The 45th César Awards ceremony, presented by the Académie des Arts et Techniques du Cinéma, took place on 28 February 2020, at the Salle Pleyel in Paris to honour the best French films of 2019. Sandrine Kiberlain presided, and Florence Foresti as the host.

Controversy and protests dogged the Academy in the months running up to the ceremony. The entire board of directors of the César Academy resigned on 13 February 2020, in response to complaints over the opaqueness of the process and the powerlessness of normal Academy members, who do not vote for nor otherwise exercise any control over the leadership of the Academy. The other issue of protest was the 12 nominations received by Roman Polanski's J'Accuse (An Officer and a Spy in English), the most nominations of any eligible film. French feminists protested heaping honors on Polanski, who was convicted of raping a minor in California in 1978 but never served his sentence, and has additionally been accused of other incidents of rape.

== Winners and nominees ==
The nominees for the 45th César Awards were announced on 29 January 2020.

Best Film (presented by Sandrine Kiberlain) Les Misérables − Produced by Toufik Ayadi and Christophe Barral; Directed by Ladj Ly: La Belle Époque − Produced by François Kraus and Denis Pineau-Valencienne; Directed by Nicolas Bedos; By the Grace of God − Produced by Nicolas Altmayer and Éric Altmayer; Directed by François Ozon; The Specials − Produced by Nicolas Duval Adassovsky; Directed by Éric Toledano and Olivier Nakache; An Officer and a Spy − Produced by Alain Goldman; Directed by Roman Polanski; Portrait of a Lady on Fire − Produced by Bénédicte Couvreur; Directed by Céline Sciamma; Oh Mercy! − Produced by Pascal Caucheteux and Grégoire Sorlat; Directed by Arnaud Desplechin	Best Director (presented by Emmanuelle Bercot & Claire Denis) Roman Polanski − An Officer and a Spy: Nicolas Bedos − La Belle Époque; François Ozon − By the Grace of God; Éric Toledano and Olivier Nakache − The Specials; Ladj Ly − Les Misérables; Céline Sciamma − Portrait of a Lady on Fire; Arnaud Desplechin − Oh Mercy!
Best Actor (presented by Marisa Berenson) Roschdy Zem − Oh Mercy! as Yacoub Daoud: Daniel Auteuil − La Belle Époque as Victor Drumond; Damien Bonnard − Les Misérables as Stéphane Ruiz; Vincent Cassel − The Specials as Bruno Haroche; Jean Dujardin − An Officer and a Spy as Marie-Georges Picquart; Reda Kateb − The Specials as Malik; Melvil Poupaud − By the Grace of God as Alexandre Guérin	Best Actress (presented by Mathieu Kassovitz) Anaïs Demoustier − Alice and the Mayor as Alice Heimann: Eva Green − Proxima as Sarah Loreau; Adèle Haenel − Portrait of a Lady on Fire as Héloïse; Chiara Mastroianni − On a Magical Night as Maria Mortemart; Noémie Merlant − Portrait of a Lady on Fire as Marianne; Doria Tillier − La Belle Époque as Margot; Karin Viard − Chanson douce as Louise
Best Supporting Actor (presented by Chiara Mastroianni) Swann Arlaud − By the Grace of God as Emmanuel Thomassin: Grégory Gadebois − An Officer and a Spy as Hubert Henry; Louis Garrel − An Officer and a Spy as Alfred Dreyfus; Benjamin Lavernhe − Mon inconnue as Félix / Gumpar; Denis Ménochet − By the Grace of God as François Debord	Best Supporting Actress (presented by Emmanuelle Devos & Vincent Dedienne) Fanny Ardant − La Belle Époque as Marianne Drumond: Josiane Balasko − By the Grace of God as Irène; Laure Calamy − Only the Animals as Alice Farange; Sara Forestier − Oh Mercy! as Marie Carpentier; Hélène Vincent − The Specials as Hélène
Most Promising Actor (presented by Déborah François & Karidja Touré) Alexis Manenti − Les Misérables as Chris: Anthony Bajon − Au nom de la terre as Thomas Jarjeau; Benjamin Lesieur − The Specials as Joseph; Liam Pierron − La Vie scolaire as Yanis Bensaadi; Djebril Zonga − Les Misérables as Gwada	Most Promising Actress (presented by Aïssa Maïga) Lyna Khoudri − Papicha as Nedjma 'Papicha': Luàna Bajrami − Portrait of a Lady on Fire as Sophie; Céleste Brunnquell − Les Éblouis as Camille Lourmel; Nina Meurisse − Camille as Camille Lepage; Mame Bineta Sané − Atlantics as Ada
Best Original Screenplay (presented by Jean-Pierre Darroussin) La Belle Époque − Nicolas Bedos: By the Grace of God − François Ozon; The Specials − Éric Toledano and Olivier Nakache; Les Misérables − Ladj Ly, Giordano Gederlini and Alexis Manenti; Portrait of a Lady on Fire − Céline Sciamma	Best Adaptation (presented by Jean-Pierre Darroussin) An Officer and a Spy − Roman Polanski and Robert Harris based on the novel by Robert Harris: Adults in the Room − Costa-Gavras based on the book Adults in the Room. My Battle with Europe's Deep Establishment by Yanis Varoufakis; I Lost My Body − Jérémy Clapin and Guillaume Laurant based on the novel Happy Hand by Guillaume Laurant; Oh Mercy! − Arnaud Desplechin and Léa Mysius based on the documentary Roubaix, commissariat central by Mosco Boucault; Only the Animals − Dominik Moll and Gilles Marchand based on the novel Seules les bêtes by Colin Niel
Best First Feature Film (presented by Florence Foresti) Papicha − Mounia Meddour: Atlantics − Mati Diop; Au nom de la terre − Édouard Bergeon; The Wolf's Call − Antonin Baudry; Les Misérables − Ladj Ly	Best Cinematography (presented by Melha Bedia & Arnaud Valois) Portrait of a Lady on Fire − Claire Mathon: La Belle Époque − Nicolas Bolduc; An Officer and a Spy − Paweł Edelman; Les Misérables − Julien Poupard; Oh Mercy! − Irina Lubtchansky
Best Editing (presented by Melha Bedia & Arnaud Valois) Les Misérables − Flora Volpelière: By the Grace of God − Laure Gardette; An Officer and a Spy − Hervé de Luze; La Belle Époque − Anny Danché and Florent Vassault; The Specials − Dorian Rigal-Ansou	Best Sound The Wolf's Call − Nicolas Cantin, Thomas Desjonquères, Raphaëll Mouterde, Olivier Goinard and Randy Thom: La Belle Époque − Rémi Daru, Séverin Favriau and Jean-Paul Hurier; An Officer and a Spy − Lucien Balibar, Aymeric Devoldère, Cyril Holtz and Niels Barletta; Les Misérables − Arnaud Lavaleix, Jérôme Gonthier and Marco Casanova; Portrait of a Lady on Fire − Julien Sicart, Valérie de Loof and Daniel Sobrino
Best Original Music (presented by Esteban) I Lost My Body − Dan Levy: Atlantics − Fatima Al Qadiri; An Officer and a Spy − Alexandre Desplat; Les Misérables − Marco Casanova and Kim Chapiron; Oh Mercy! − Grégoire Hetzel	Best Costume Design (presented by Antoine Reinartz) An Officer and a Spy − Pascaline Chavanne: La Belle Époque − Emmanuelle Youchnovski; Edmond − Thierry Delettre; Joan of Arc − Alexandra Charles; Portrait of a Lady on Fire − Dorothée Guiraud
Best Production Design (presented by Antoine Reinartz) La Belle Époque − Stéphane Rozenbaum: The Wolf's Call − Benoît Barouh; Edmond − Franck Schwarz; An Officer and a Spy − Jean Rabasse; Portrait of a Lady on Fire − Thomas Grézaud	Best Documentary Film (presented by Antoine de Caunes) M − Yolande Zauberman: 68, mon Père − Samuel Bigiaoui; La Cordillère des songes − Patricio Guzmán; Lourdes − Thierry Demaizière and Alban Teurlai; Wonder boy Olivier Rousteing, né sous X − Anissa Bonnefont
Best Animated Feature Film (presented by Benjamin Lavernhe) I Lost My Body − Jérémy Clapin: The Bears' Famous Invasion of Sicily − Lorenzo Mattotti; The Swallows of Kabul − Zabou Breitman and Éléa Gobbé-Mévellec	Best Animated Short Film (presented by Benjamin Lavernhe) La nuit des sacs plastiques − Gabriel Harel: This Magnificent Cake! (Ce magnifique gâteau !) − Marc James Roels and Emma de Swaef; Je sors acheter des cigarettes − Osman Cerfon; Make It Soul − Jean-Charles Mbotti Malolo
Best Short Film (presented by Eye Haïdara & Maurice Barthélemy) Pile Poil − Lauriane Escaffre and Yvonnick Muller: Beautiful Loser − Maxime Roy; Le Chant d'Ahmed − Foued Mansour; Le Chien bleu − Fanny Liatard; Nefta Football Club − Yves Piat	Best Foreign Film (presented by Alban Ivanov) Parasite (South Korea) – Directed by Bong Joon-ho: Pain and Glory (Spain) – Directed by Pedro Almodóvar; Young Ahmed (Belgium) – Directed by Luc Dardenne and Jean-Pierre Dardenne; Joker (United States) – Directed by Todd Phillips; Lola (Belgium/France) – Directed by Laurent Micheli; Once Upon a Time in Hollywood (United States) – Directed by Quentin Tarantino; The Traitor (Italy/France/Germany/Brazil) – Directed by Marco Bellocchio
Audience Award (presented by Josiane Balasko) Les Misérables – Ladj Ly: Qu'est-ce qu'on a encore fait au Bon Dieu ? – Philippe de Chauveron; Nous finirons ensemble – Guillaume Canet; The Specials – Éric Toledano and Olivier Nakache; Au nom de la terre – Édouard Bergeon	

== Controversies ==
Roman Polanski's Best Director win for An Officer and a Spy was poorly received by the audience. Few clapped, and several audience members walked out in disgust, including Best Director nominee Céline Sciamma and Best Actress nominees Adèle Haenel and Noémie Merlant.

Polanski as well as other crew members of An Officer and a Spy did not attend the ceremony. No one was there to accept the award on Polanski's behalf.

== See also ==
- 25th Lumière Awards
- 10th Magritte Awards
- 32nd European Film Awards
- 92nd Academy Awards
- 73rd British Academy Film Awards
