= César Award for Best Supporting Actor =

French film award

- Awarded for: Best Performance by an Actor in a Supporting Role
- Country: France
- Presented by: Académie des Arts et Techniques du Cinéma
- First award: 1976
- Currently held by: Pierre Lottin for The Stranger (2026)
- Website: academie-cinema.org

The César Award for Best Actress in a Supporting Role (French: César du meilleur second rôle masculin) is one of the César Awards, presented annually by the Académie des Arts et Techniques du Cinéma to recognize the outstanding performance in a supporting role of an actor who has worked within the French film industry during the year preceding the ceremony. Nominees and winner are selected via a run-off voting by all the members of the Académie.

== Winners and nominees ==
=== 1970s ===
Year	Actor	English title	Original title	Role(s)
1976 (1st)	Jean Rochefort	Let Joy Reign Supreme	Que la fête commence...	Abbot Dubois
1976 (1st)	Jean Bouise	The Old Gun	Le Vieux Fusil	François
1976 (1st)	Patrick Dewaere	The French Detective	Adieu poulet	Lefèvre
1976 (1st)	Victor Lanoux	The French Detective	Adieu poulet	Pierre Lardatte
1977 (2nd)	Claude Brasseur	Pardon Mon Affaire	Un éléphant ça trompe énormément	Daniel
1977 (2nd)	Jean-Claude Brialy	The Judge and the Assassin	Le Juge et l'Assassin	Villedieu
1977 (2nd)	Charles Denner	Second Chance	Si c'était à refaire	Attorney
1977 (2nd)	Jacques Dutronc	Mado		Pierre
1978 (3rd)	Jacques Dufilho	Drummer-Crab	Le Crabe-Tambour	Chef
1978 (3rd)	Michel Aumont	Spoiled Children	Des enfants gâtés	Pierre
1978 (3rd)	Jean-François Balmer	The Threat	La Menace	Waldeck
1978 (3rd)	Jean Bouise	Judge Fayard Called the Sheriff	Le Juge Fayard dit Le Shériff	Arnould
1978 (3rd)	Philippe Léotard	Judge Fayard Called the Sheriff	Le Juge Fayard dit Le Shériff	Marec
1979 (4th)	Jacques Villeret	Robert and Robert	Robert et Robert	Robert Villiers
1979 (4th)	Claude Brasseur	A Simple Story	Une histoire simple	Serge
1979 (4th)	Jean Carmet	The Sugar	Le Sucre	Adrien Courtois
1979 (4th)	Michel Serrault	Other People's Money	L'Argent des autres	Mirement

=== 1980s ===
Year	Actor	English title	Original title	Role(s)
1980 (5th)	Jean Bouise	Hothead	Coup de tête	Sivardière
1980 (5th)	Michel Aumont	Courage - Let's Run		Franckie
1980 (5th)	Bernard Blier	Série noire		Staplin
1980 (5th)	Bernard Giraudeau	The Medic	Le Toubib	François
1981 (6th)	Jacques Dufilho	A Bad Son	Un mauvais fils	Adrien Dussart
1981 (6th)	Heinz Bennent	The Last Metro	Le Dernier Métro	Lucas Steiner
1981 (6th)	Guy Marchand	Loulou		André
1981 (6th)	Alain Souchon	I Love You All	Je vous aime	Claude
1982 (7th)	Guy Marchand	Under Suspicion	Garde à vue	Marcel Belmont
1982 (7th)	Gérard Lanvin	Strange Affair	Une étrange affaire	Louis Coline
1982 (7th)	Jean-Pierre Marielle	Clean Up	Coup de torchon	Péron / Georges
1982 (7th)	Eddy Mitchell	Clean Up	Coup de torchon	Nono
1983 (8th)	Jean Carmet	Les Misérables		Thénardier
1983 (8th)	Michel Jonasz	Qu'est-ce qui fait courir David?		Simon
1983 (8th)	Gérard Klein	The Passerby	La Passante du Sans-Souci	Maurice Bouillard
1983 (8th)	Jean-François Stévenin	A Room in Town	Une chambre en ville	Dambiel
1984 (9th)	Richard Anconina	So Long, Stooge	Tchao Pantin	Youseff Bensoussan
1984 (9th)	François Cluzet	One Deadly Summer	L'été meurtrier	Mickey
1984 (9th)	Bernard Fresson	Waiter!	Garçon!	Francis
1984 (9th)	Guy Marchand	At First Sight	Coup de foudre (a.k.a. Entre nous)	Michel Korski
1984 (9th)	Jacques Villeret	Waiter!	Garçon!	Gilbert
1985 (10th)	Richard Bohringer	L'Addition		Albert Lorca
1985 (10th)	Michel Aumont	A Sunday in the Country	Un dimanche à la campagne	Gonzague
1985 (10th)	Bernard-Pierre Donnadieu	Barbarous Street	Rue barbare	Mathias Hagen
1985 (10th)	Fabrice Luchini	Full Moon in Paris	Les Nuits de la pleine lune	Octave
1985 (10th)	Lambert Wilson	The Public Woman	La Femme publique	Milan Mliska
1986 (11th)	Michel Boujenah	Three Men and a Cradle	3 hommes et un couffin	Michel
1986 (11th)	Jean-Hugues Anglade	Subway		The Roller
1986 (11th)	Jean-Pierre Bacri	Subway		Inspector Batman
1986 (11th)	Michel Galabru	Subway		Commissioner Gesberg
1986 (11th)	Xavier Deluc	He Died with His Eyes Open	On ne meurt que 2 fois	Hugo Spark
1987 (12th)	Pierre Arditi	Mélo		Pierre Belcroix
1987 (12th)	Jean Carmet	Fugitives	Les Fugitifs	M. Martin
1987 (12th)	Gérard Darmon	Betty Blue	37°2 le matin	Eddy
1987 (12th)	Claude Piéplu	Paltoquet	Le Paltoquet	Professor
1987 (12th)	Jean-Louis Trintignant	Women of My Life	La Femme de ma vie	Pierre
1988 (13th)	Jean-Claude Brialy	The Innocents	Les innocents	Klotz
1988 (13th)	Jean-Pierre Kalfon	The Cry of the Owl	Le Cri du hibou	Police Commissioner
1988 (13th)	Jean-Pierre Léaud	Lady Cops	Les Keufs	Commissioner Bullfinch
1988 (13th)	Guy Marchand	Widow's Walk	Noyade interdite	Inspector Leroyer
1988 (13th)	Tom Novembre	Agent trouble		Victorien
1989 (14th)	Patrick Chesnais	The Reader	La Lectrice	CEO
1989 (14th)	Patrick Bouchitey	Life Is a Long Quiet River	La Vie est un long fleuve tranquille	Father Aubergé
1989 (14th)	Alain Cuny	Camille Claudel		Louis-Prosper Claudel
1989 (14th)	Jean-Pierre Marielle	A Few Days with Me	Quelques jours avec moi	Raoul Fonfrin
1989 (14th)	Jean Reno	The Big Blue	Le Grand bleu	Enzo Molinari

=== 1990s ===
Year	Actor	English title	Original title	Role(s)
1990 (15th)	Robert Hirsch	Winter of '54: Father Pierre	Hiver 54, l'abbé Pierre	Raoul
1990 (15th)	Roland Blanche	Too Beautiful for You	Trop belle pour toi	Marcello
1990 (15th)	Jacques Bonnaffé	Baptême		André Gravey
1990 (15th)	François Cluzet	Force Majeure		Daniel
1990 (15th)	François Perrot	Life and Nothing But	La Vie et rien d'autre	Perrin
1991 (16th)	Jacques Weber	Cyrano de Bergerac		Count Antoine de Guiche
1991 (16th)	Maurice Garrel	The Discreet	La Discrète	Jean
1991 (16th)	Michel Duchaussoy	Milou in May	Milou en mai	Georges
1991 (16th)	Michel Galabru	Uranus		Monglat
1991 (16th)	Daniel Prévost	Uranus		Rochard
1992 (17th)	Jean Carmet	Thank You, Life	Mercie la vie	Raymond Pelleveau (Old Father)
1992 (17th)	Jean-Claude Dreyfus	Delicatessen		Clapet
1992 (17th)	Ticky Holgado	Une époque formidable...		Crayon
1992 (17th)	Bernard Le Coq	Van Gogh		Théodore Van Gogh
1992 (17th)	Gérard Séty	Van Gogh		Dr Paul Gachet
1993 (18th)	André Dussollier	A Heart in Winter	Un cœur en hiver	Maxime
1993 (18th)	Patrick Timsit	The Crisis	La Crise	Michou
1993 (18th)	Jean Yanne	Indochine		Guy Asselin
1993 (18th)	Jean-Pierre Marielle	Max et Jérémie		Almeida
1993 (18th)	Fabrice Luchini	The Return of Casanova	Le Retour de Casanova	Camille
1994 (19th)	Fabrice Luchini	All That... for This?!	Tout ça... pour ça!	Fabrice Lenormand
1994 (19th)	Jean-Pierre Darroussin	Cuisine et Dépendances		Fred
1994 (19th)	Jean-Roger Milo	Germinal		Antoine Chaval
1994 (19th)	Thomas Langmann	Le Nombril du monde		Marcel
1994 (19th)	Didier Bezace	Low Profile	Profil bas	Commissioner Carré
1995 (20th)	Jean-Hugues Anglade	Queen Margot	La Reine Margot	Charles IX
1995 (20th)	Bernard Giraudeau	The Favourite Son	Le Fils préféré	François
1995 (20th)	Fabrice Luchini	Colonel Chabert	Le Colonel Chabert	Maïtre Derville
1995 (20th)	Claude Rich	The Daughter of D'Artagnan	La Fille de d'Artagnan	Duke Clovis de Crassac
1995 (20th)	Daniel Russo	Nine Months	Neuf mois	Georges
1996 (21st)	Eddy Mitchell	Happiness Is in the Field	Le Bonheur est dans le pré	Gérard Thulliez
1996 (21st)	Jean-Pierre Cassel	The Ceremony	La Cérémonie	Georges
1996 (21st)	Ticky Holgado	French Twist	Gazon maudit	Antoine
1996 (21st)	Jean-Hugues Anglade	Nelly and Mr. Arnaud	Nelly et Mr. Arnaud	Vincent Granec
1996 (21st)	Michael Lonsdale	Nelly and Mr. Arnaud	Nelly et Mr. Arnaud	Dollabella
1997 (22nd)	Jean-Pierre Darroussin	Family Resemblances	Un air de famille	Denis
1997 (22nd)	Jacques Gamblin	Pédale douce		André Lemoine
1997 (22nd)	Bernard Giraudeau	Ridicule		Abbot de Vilecourt
1997 (22nd)	Jean Rochefort	Ridicule		Marquis de Bellegarde
1997 (22nd)	Albert Dupontel	A Self Made Hero	Un héros très discret	Dionnet
1998 (23rd)	Jean-Pierre Bacri	Same Old Song	On connaît la chanson	Nicolas
1998 (23rd)	Jean-Pierre Darroussin	Marius and Jeannette	Marius et Jeannette	Dédé
1998 (23rd)	Gérard Jugnot	Marthe		Henri
1998 (23rd)	Vincent Pérez	On Guard	Le Bossu	Philippe de Nevers
1998 (23rd)	Lambert Wilson	Same Old Song	On connaît la chanson	Marc Duveyrier
1999 (24th)	Daniel Prévost	The Dinner Game	Le Dîner de cons	Lucien Cheval
1999 (24th)	Jacques Dutronc	Place Vendôme		Battistelli
1999 (24th)	Bernard Fresson	Place Vendôme		Vincent Malivert
1999 (24th)	Vincent Pérez	Those Who Love Me Can Take the Train	Ceux qui m'aiment prendront le train	Frédéric / Vivane
1999 (24th)	Jean-Louis Trintignant	Those Who Love Me Can Take the Train	Ceux qui m'aiment prendront le train	Jean-Baptiste / Lucien Emmerich

=== 2000s ===
Year	Actor	English title	Original title	Role(s)
2000 (25th)	François Berléand	My Little Business	Ma petite entreprise	Maxime Nassieff
2000 (25th)	Jacques Dufilho	C'est quoi la vie?		Noël
2000 (25th)	André Dussollier	The Children of the Marshland	Les Enfants du marais	Amédée
2000 (25th)	Claude Rich	Season's Beatings	La Bûche	Stanislas Roman
2000 (25th)	Roschdy Zem	My Little Business	Ma petite entreprise	Sami
2001 (26th)	Gérard Lanvin	The Taste of Others	Le Goût des autres	Franck Moreno
2001 (26th)	Jean-Pierre Kalfon	Saint-Cyr		Louis XIV
2001 (26th)	Emir Kusturica	The Widow of Saint-Pierre	La Veuve de Saint-Pierre	Neel Auguste
2001 (26th)	Lambert Wilson	Jet Set		Artus de Poulignac
2001 (26th)	Alain Chabat	The Taste of Others	Le Goût des autres	Bruno Deschamps
2002 (27th)	André Dussollier	The Officers' Ward	La Chambre des officiers	The Surgeon
2002 (27th)	Edouard Baer	Betty Fisher and Other Stories	Betty Fisher et autres histoires	Alex Basato
2002 (27th)	Jamel Debbouze	Amélie	Le Fabuleux Destin d'Amélie Poulain	Lucien
2002 (27th)	Rufus	Amélie	Le Fabuleux Destin d'Amélie Poulain	Raphaël Poulain
2002 (27th)	Jean-Paul Roussillon	One Swallow Brought Spring	Une hirondelle a fait le printemps	Jean
2003 (28th)	Bernard Le Coq	Beautiful Memories	Se souvenir des belles choses	Professor Christian Licht
2003 (28th)	François Cluzet	The Adversary	L'Adversaire	Luc
2003 (28th)	Gérard Darmon	Asterix & Obelix: Mission Cleopatra	Astérix & Obélix: Mission Cléopâtre	Amonbofis
2003 (28th)	Jamel Debbouze	Asterix & Obelix: Mission Cleopatra	Astérix & Obélix: Mission Cléopâtre	Numérobis
2003 (28th)	Denis Podalydès	Summer Things	Embrassez qui vous voudrez	Jérôme
2004 (29th)	Darry Cowl	Not on the Lips	Pas sur la bouche	Madame Foin
2004 (29th)	Yvan Attal	Bon Voyage		Raoul
2004 (29th)	Clovis Cornillac	Nickel and Dime	À la petite semaine	Didier
2004 (29th)	Marc Lavoine	The Heart of Men	Le Cœur des hommes	Alex
2004 (29th)	Jean-Pierre Marielle	Little Lili	La Petite Lili	Simon Marceaux
2005 (30th)	Clovis Cornillac	The Story of My Life	Mensonges et trahisons et plus si affinités...	Kevin
2005 (30th)	François Berléand	The Chorus	Les Choristes	Rachin
2005 (30th)	André Dussollier	Department 36	36 Quai des Orfèvres	Robert Mancini
2005 (30th)	Maurice Garrel	Kings and Queen	Rois et reine	Louis Jennsens
2005 (30th)	Jean-Paul Rouve	Podium		Jean-Baptiste Coussaud
2006 (31st)	Niels Arestrup	The Beat That My Heart Skipped	De battre mon cœur s'est arrêté	Robert Seyr
2006 (31st)	Maurice Bénichou	Hidden	Caché	Majid
2006 (31st)	Dany Boon	Merry Christmas	Joyeux Noël	Ponchel
2006 (31st)	Georges Wilson	Not Here to Be Loved	Je ne suis pas là pour être aimé	M. Delsart
2006 (31st)	Roschdy Zem	The Young Lieutenant	Le Petit lieutenant	Solo
2007 (32nd)	Kad Merad	Don't Worry, I'm Fine	Je vais bien, ne t'en fais pas	Paul Tellier
2007 (32nd)	Dany Boon	The Valet	La Doublure	Richard
2007 (32nd)	François Cluzet	Quatre étoiles		René
2007 (32nd)	André Dussollier	Tell No One	Ne le dis à personne	Jacques Laurentin
2007 (32nd)	Guy Marchand	Inside Paris	Dans Paris	Mirko
2008 (33rd)	Sami Bouajila	The Witnesses	Les Témoins	Mehdi
2008 (33rd)	Pascal Greggory	La Vie en Rose	La môme	Louis Barrier
2008 (33rd)	Michael Lonsdale	Heartbeat Detector	La Question humaine	Mathias Jüst
2008 (33rd)	Fabrice Luchini	Molière		Monsieur Jourdain
2008 (33rd)	Laurent Stocker	Hunting and Gathering	Ensemble, c'est tout	Philibert Marquet de la Tubelière
2009 (34th)	Jean-Paul Roussillon	A Christmas Tale	Un conte De Noël	Abel
2009 (34th)	Benjamin Biolay	Stella		Stella's father
2009 (34th)	Claude Rich	With a Little Help from Myself	Aide-toi, le ciel t'aidera	Robert
2009 (34th)	Pierre Vaneck	Love Me No More	Deux jours à tuer	Antoine
2009 (34th)	Roschdy Zem	The Girl from Monaco	La Fille de Monaco	Christophe Abadi

=== 2010s ===
Year	Actor	English title	Original title	Role(s)
2010 (35th)	Niels Arestrup	A Prophet	Un prophète	César Luciani
2010 (35th)	Jean-Hugues Anglade	Persécution		The madman
2010 (35th)	Joeystarr	The Ball of the Actresses	Le Bal des actrice	Himself
2010 (35th)	Benoît Poelvoorde	Coco Before Chanel	Coco avant Chanel	Étienne Balsan
2010 (35th)	Michel Vuillermoz	One for the Road	Le Dernier pour la route	Pierre
2011 (36th)	Michael Lonsdale	Of Gods and Men	Des hommes et des dieux	Luc Dochier
2011 (36th)	Niels Arestrup	The Big Picture	L'Homme qui voulait vivre sa vie	Bartholomé
2011 (36th)	François Damiens	Heartbreaker	L'Arnacœur	Marc
2011 (36th)	Gilles Lellouche	Little White Lies	Les Petits Mouchoirs	Eric
2011 (36th)	Olivier Rabourdin	Of Gods and Men	Des hommes et des dieux	Christophe
2012 (37th)	Michel Blanc	The Minister	L'Exercice de l'État	Gilles
2012 (37th)	Nicolas Duvauchelle	Polisse		Mathieu
2012 (37th)	Joeystarr	Polisse		Fred
2012 (37th)	Frédéric Pierrot	Polisse		Balloo
2012 (37th)	Bernard Le Coq	The Conquest	La Conquête	Jacques Chirac
2013 (38th)	Guillaume de Tonquédec	What's in a Name?	Le Prénom	Claude
2013 (38th)	Samir Guesmi	Camille Rewinds	Camille redouble	Eric
2013 (38th)	Benoît Magimel	My Way	Cloclo	Paul Lederman
2013 (38th)	Claude Rich	Looking for Hortense	Cherchez Hortense	Sébastien Hauer
2013 (38th)	Michel Vuillermoz	Camille Rewinds	Camille redouble	Camille's father
2014 (39th)	Niels Arestrup	The French Minister	Quai d'Orsay	Claude Maupas
2014 (39th)	Patrick Chesnais	Bright Days Ahead	Les Beaux Jours	Philippe
2014 (39th)	Patrick d'Assumçao	Stranger by the Lake	L'Inconnu du lac	Henri
2014 (39th)	François Damiens	Suzanne		Nicolas
2014 (39th)	Olivier Gourmet	Grand Central		Gilles
2015 (40th)	Reda Kateb	Hippocrates	Hippocrate	Abdel Rezzak
2015 (40th)	Éric Elmosnino	The Bélier Family	La Famille Bélier	Fabien Thomasson
2015 (40th)	Louis Garrel	Saint Laurent		Jacques de Bascher
2015 (40th)	Jérémie Renier	Saint Laurent		Pierre Bergé
2015 (40th)	Guillaume Gallienne	Yves Saint Laurent		Pierre Bergé
2016 (41st)	Benoît Magimel	Standing Tall	La Tête haute	Yann
2016 (41st)	Michel Fau	Marguerite		Atos Pezzini / Divo
2016 (41st)	André Marcon	Marguerite		Georges Dumont
2016 (41st)	Louis Garrel	Mon roi		Solal
2016 (41st)	Vincent Rottiers	Dheepan		Brahim
2017 (42nd)	James Thierrée	Chocolat		George Foottit
2017 (42nd)	Gabriel Arcand	A Kid	Le Fils de Jean	Pierre
2017 (42nd)	Vincent Cassel	It's Only the End of the World	Juste la fin du monde	Antoine
2017 (42nd)	Vincent Lacoste	In Bed with Victoria	Victoria	Sam
2017 (42nd)	Melvil Poupaud	In Bed with Victoria	Victoria	Vincent
2017 (42nd)	Laurent Lafitte	Elle		Patrick
2018 (43rd)	Antoine Reinartz	BPM (Beats per Minute)	120 battements par minute	Thibault
2018 (43rd)	Niels Arestrup	See You Up There	Au revoir là-haut	Marcel Péricourt
2018 (43rd)	Laurent Lafitte	See You Up There	Au revoir là-haut	Henri d'Aulnay-Pradelle
2018 (43rd)	Gilles Lellouche	C'est la vie!	Le Sens de la fête	James
2018 (43rd)	Vincent Macaigne	C'est la vie!	Le Sens de la fête	Julien
2019 (44th)	Philippe Katerine	Sink or Swim	Le grand bain	Thierry
2019 (44th)	Denis Podalydès	Sorry Angel	Plaire, aimer et courir vite	Mathieu
2019 (44th)	Damien Bonnard	The Trouble with You	En liberté!	Louis
2019 (44th)	Clovis Cornillac	Little Tickles	Les chatouilles	Fabrice Le Nadant
2019 (44th)	Jean-Hugues Anglade	Sink or Swim	Le grand bain	Simon

=== 2020s ===
Year	Actor	English title	Original title	Role(s)
2020 (45th)	Swann Arlaud	By the Grace of God	Grâce à Dieu	Emmanuel Thomassin
2020 (45th)	Grégory Gadebois	An Officer and a Spy	J'accuse	Hubert Henry
2020 (45th)	Louis Garrel	An Officer and a Spy	J'accuse	Alfred Dreyfus
2020 (45th)	Benjamin Lavernhe	Love at Second Sight	Mon inconnue	Félix
2020 (45th)	Denis Ménochet	By the Grace of God	Grâce à Dieu	François Debord
2021 (46th)	Nicolas Marié	Bye Bye Morons	Adieu les cons	M. Blin
2021 (46th)	Edouard Baer	How to Be a Good Wife	La Bonne Épouse	André Grunvald
2021 (46th)	Louis Garrel	DNA	ADN	François
2021 (46th)	Benjamin Lavernhe	My Donkey, My Lover & I	Antoinette dans les Cévennes	Vladimir
2021 (46th)	Vincent Macaigne	Love Affair(s)	Les Choses qu'on dit, les choses qu'on fait	François
2022 (47th)	Vincent Lacoste	Lost Illusions	Illusions perdues	Etienne Lousteau
2022 (47th)	François Civil	The Stronghold	BAC Nord	Antoine
2022 (47th)	Xavier Dolan	Lost Illusions	Illusions perdues	Nathan d'Anastazio
2022 (47th)	Karim Leklou	The Stronghold	BAC Nord	Yass
2022 (47th)	Sylvain Marcel	Aline		Guy-Claude Kamar
2023 (48th)	Bouli Lanners	The Night of the 12th	La Nuit du 12	Marceau
2023 (48th)	François Civil	Rise	En corps	Yann
2023 (48th)	Micha Lescot	Forever Young	Les Amandiers	Pierre Romans
2023 (48th)	Pio Marmaï	Rise	En corps	Loic
2023 (48th)	Roschdy Zem	The Innocent	L'Innocent	Michel
2024 (49th)	Swann Arlaud	Anatomy of a Fall	Anatomie d'une chute	Vincent Renzi
2024 (49th)	Anthony Bajon	Junkyard Dog (film)	Chien de la casse	Dog
2024 (49th)	Arthur Harari	The Goldman Case	Le procès Goldman	Georges Kiejman
2024 (49th)	Pio Marmaï	Yannick		Pierre Rivière
2024 (49th)	Antoine Reinartz	Anatomy of a Fall	Anatomie d'une chute	The Prosecutor
2025 (50th)	Alain Chabat	Beating Hearts	L'Amour ouf	Jackie's father
2025 (50th)	David Ayala	Misericordia	Miséricorde	Walter Bonchamp
2025 (50th)	Bastien Bouillon	The Count of Monte Cristo	Le Comte de Monte-Cristo	Fernand de Morcerf
2025 (50th)	Jacques Develay	Misericordia	Miséricorde	Abbé Philippe Griseul
2025 (50th)	Laurent Lafitte	The Count of Monte Cristo	Le Comte de Monte-Cristo	Gérard de Villefort
2026 (51st)	Pierre Lottin	The Stranger	L'Étranger	Raymond Sintès
2026 (51st)	Michel Fau	The Great Arch	L'Inconnu de la Grande Arche	François Mitterrand
2026 (51st)	Raphael Personnaz	The Richest Woman in the World	La femme la plus riche du monde	Jérôme Bonjean
2026 (51st)	Swann Arlaud	The Great Arch	L'Inconnu de la Grande Arche	Paul Andreu
2026 (51st)	Xavier Dolan	The Great Arch	L'Inconnu de la Grande Arche	Jean-Louis Subilon

== Multiple wins and nominations ==
The following individuals received two or more Best Supporting Actor awards:

Wins	Actor
3	Niels Arestrup
2	Jean Carmet
2	Jacques Dufilho
2	André Dussollier
2	Swann Arlaud

The following individuals received three or more Best Supporting Actor nominations:

Nominations	Actor
5	Jean-Hugues Anglade
5	Niels Arestrup
5	André Dussollier
5	Guy Marchand
5	Fabrice Luchini
4	Jean Carmet
4	Jean-Pierre Marielle
4	Claude Rich
4	Jamel Debbouze
4	Roschdy Zem
4	Louis Garrel
3	Swann Arlaud
3	Michel Aumont
3	Jean Bouise
3	Clovis Cornillac
3	Jean-Pierre Darroussin
3	Jacques Dufilho
3	Laurent Lafitte
3	Bernard Le Coq
3	Michael Lonsdale
3	François Cluzet
3	Bernard Giraudeau
3	Lambert Wilson

== Age superlatives ==
Superlative	Best Actor		Best Supporting Actor		Overall (including Most Promising Actor)	
Actor with most awards	Michel Serrault	3	Niels Arestrup	3	Michel Serrault; Niels Arestrup; André Dussollier; Mathieu Amalric	3
Actor with most nominations	Gérard Depardieu	17	André Dussollier; Fabrice Luchini; Guy Marchand; Jean-Pierre Marielle; Niels Arestrup	5	Gérard Depardieu	17
Actor with most nominations without ever winning	Patrick Dewaere	5	Jean-Pierre Marielle	5	Jean-Pierre Marielle	7
Film with most nominations	Le Sucre; Tandem; Itinerary of a Spoiled Child; Le Souper; Les Visiteurs; The Intouchables	2	Subway; Polisse	3	Subway; La Haine; The Officers' Ward; A Prophet	4
Oldest winner	Jean-Louis Trintignant	83	Michael Lonsdale	80	Jean-Louis Trintignant	83
Oldest nominee	Michel Bouquet	89	Jacques Dufilho	86	Michel Bouquet	89
Youngest winner	Pierre Niney	26	Jacques Villeret	28	Pierre Niney	26
Youngest nominee	Vincent Lacoste	22	Thomas Langmann	23	Vincent Lacoste	22

== See also ==
- Academy Award for Best Supporting Actor
- BAFTA Award for Best Supporting Actor
