= Les Indésirables =

2023 French film directed by Ladj Ly

- Directed by: Ladj Ly
- Written by: Ladj Ly; Giordano Gederlini
- Produced by: Toufik Ayadi; Christophe Barral
- Starring: Alexis Manenti; Anta Diaw
- Cinematography: Julien Poupard
- Edited by: Flora Volpelière
- Production companies: Rectangle Productions; Srab Films
- Distributed by: Le Pacte
- Release date: 8 September 2023 (TIFF)
- Country: France
- Language: French

Les Indésirables (French pronunciation: [lez‿ɛ̃deziʁabl]; French: Bâtiment 5) is a French drama film, directed by Ladj Ly and released in 2023. The film stars Alexis Manenti as Pierre, a young doctor who is appointed mayor of a working-class suburb of Paris following the former mayor's death, and Anta Diaw as Haby, a young woman living in a tower block in the city who becomes an activist for the "undesirables" who may be driven out by Pierre's vow to clean up and gentrify the community.

Its cast also includes Jeanne Balibar, Steve Tientcheu, Aristote Luyindula and Valentin Pradier.

== Production ==
The film is thematically related to, and was made by much of the same production team as, Ly's 2019 film Les Misérables, but is not a direct sequel. The launch of shooting on the film was announced in December 2022.

Although it was written and in production well before the outbreak of the Nahel Merzouk protests in June 2023, it has been called a timely examination of some of the same social and political pressures that led to the riots.

== Release ==
The film premiered at the 2023 Toronto International Film Festival on September 8, 2023.

== Critical response ==
Tim Grierson of Screen Daily wrote that "Ly’s debut occasionally would strain when attempting to make grand dramatic gestures and Les Indesirables is no different, heading toward an overheated finale in which the powder keg that has been building throughout the film finally detonates. But throughout, Ly benefits from returning cinematographer Julien Poupard’s unvarnished lensing which starkly captures the story’s anxious stakes. This is never more heartbreakingly implemented than during an affecting sequence in which the tenement residents are at last thrown out of their homes, the immigrants’ bedding and personal items solemnly tossed from the high-rise windows. But even when the filmmaker perhaps oversteps narratively to illustrate the depth of these immigrants’ fury, he smartly refuses to offer a simplistic homily in response to the emotional tumult he has crafted. Les Indesirables understands that troubling issues of race and class are ingrained in society, perhaps insoluble. But that will not keep him from acknowledging the fire that burns."
