= Fanny Ardant =

French actress (born 1949)

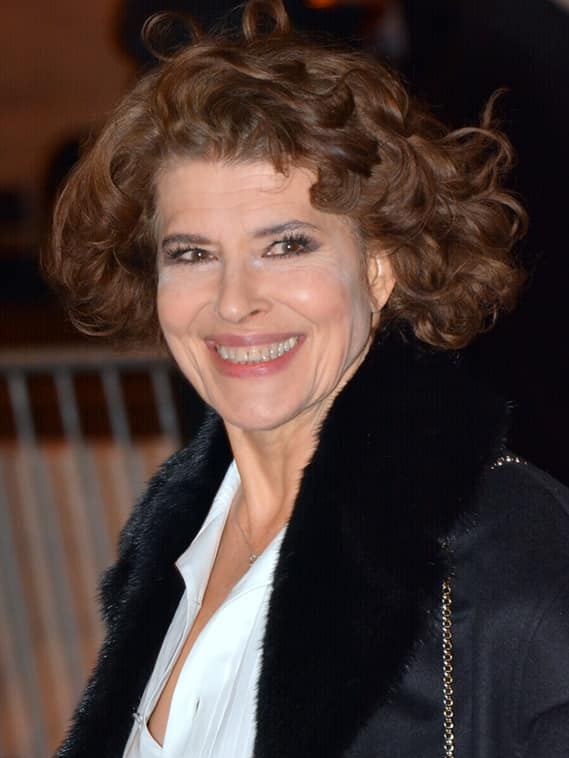
- Ardant at the 45th César Awards in 2020
- Born: Fanny Marguerite Judith Ardant; 22 March 1949 (age 77); Saumur, Maine-et-Loire, France
- Occupation: Actress
- Years active: 1974–present
- Partner: François Truffaut (1981–1984; his death)
- Children: 3

Fanny Marguerite Judith Ardant (French: [fani aʁdɑ̃]; born 22 March 1949) is a French actress and film director. She is the recipient of numerous accolades, including two César Awards and a Lumière Award.

== Early life ==
Ardant was born on 22 March 1949, in Saumur, Maine-et-Loire, France, to a military attaché and cavalry officer father. The youngest of five children, Ardant was raised in Monaco where she was educated at a convent school. A voracious reader, she discovered Proust at age 15 and felt as though his writings were for her. At age 17, she became a student at the Institut d'études politiques d'Aix-en-Provence. In her early twenties, her interest turned to acting and in 1974 she made her first appearance on stage.

When she was 27, her father died. After his death, she followed his advice and went to university in Aix-en-Provence, where she read Political Science. Upon graduation, she took a job working for the French embassy in London, from which she was sacked for poor time keeping and for being dishevelled. The latter was attributed to the social whirl she enjoyed in London.

Ardant continued working odd jobs in London before deciding, almost on a whim, to go to drama school. She returned to France for her studies and before long began acting on stage and then on television.

== Career ==
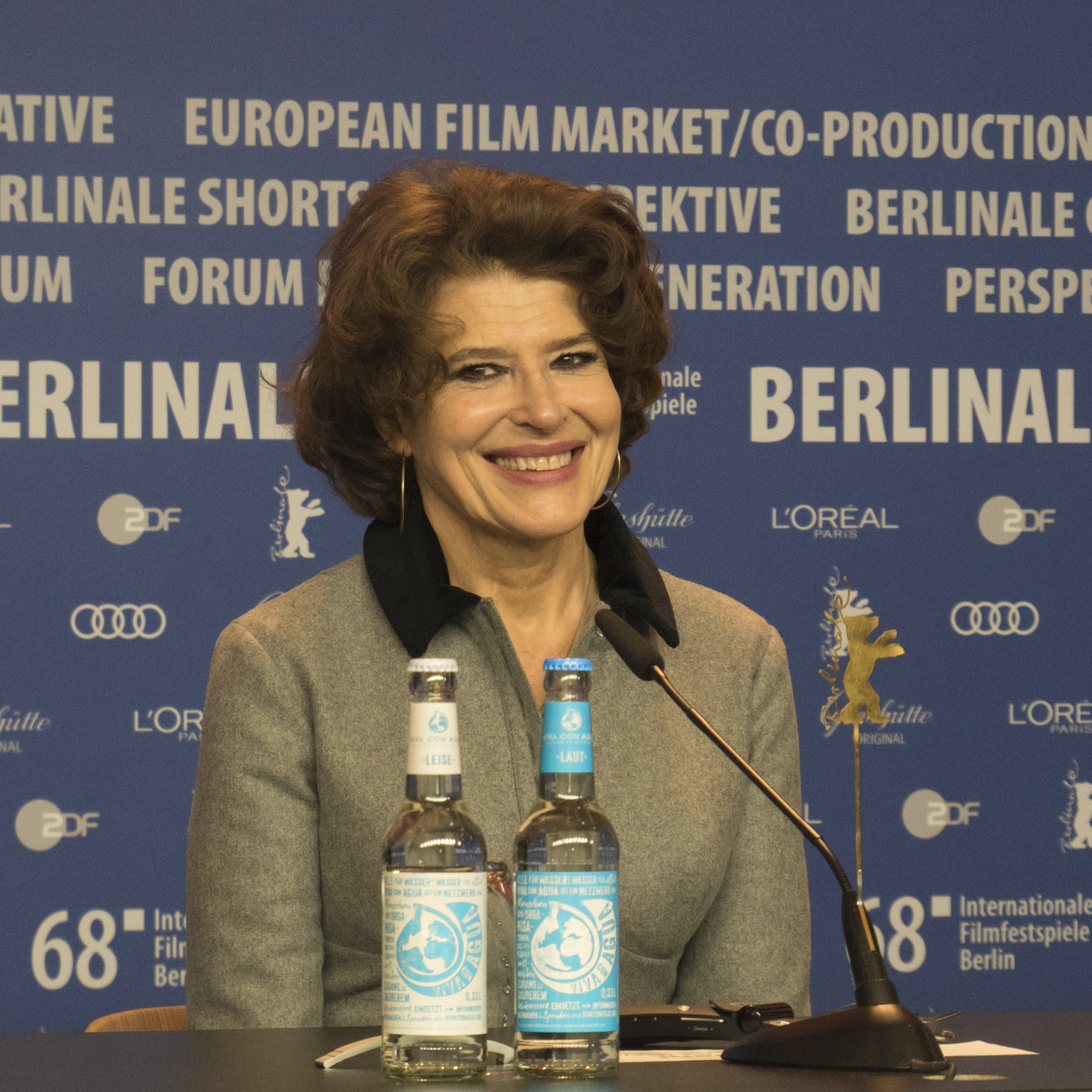
Fanny Ardant at the press conference of Shock Waves – Diary of My Mind at Berlinale 2018

At the age of 31 she was contacted by François Truffaut, who had spotted her in a television drama and wanted to cast her in the lead female role of his next film, La Femme d'à côté (The Woman Next Door). That film, in which Ardant co-starred with Gérard Depardieu, was her breakthrough role, bringing her a César Award nomination for best actress in 1982. In 1984 she was nominated again for Vivement dimanche!, also directed by Truffaut. Initially, Ardant's youthful beauty brought popularity but over time her sophistication and acting skills made her one of France's most admired actresses. She later proved her versatility, playing a comedic role in Pédale douce for which she won the 1997 César Award for Best Actress.

Fluent in English and Italian, Ardant has starred in several Hollywood and British films. Her most recent English-language film was the 2002 Franco Zeffirelli production Callas Forever, in which she portrayed opera diva Maria Callas. It opened the 14th Annual Palm Springs International Film Festival on 9 January 2003. In 2003, Ardant received the Stanislavsky Award at the 25th Moscow International Film Festival (for the outstanding achievement in the career of acting and devotion to the principles of Stanislavsky's school).

In 2009, she became a director and screenwriter, with Cendres et sang (Ashes and Blood). She also took part in a rare performance of Sardou's La Haine on 19 July 2009 at the Festival de Radio France et Montpellier Languedoc Roussillon, with Gérard Depardieu, the concert broadcast on France Musique.

In 2010, she directed a short feature, Absent Chimeras (Chimères absentes in French), in which she also stars. She made this short film in order to raise public awareness to the plight of Romani people in Europe, a cause she personally defends. In 2011, she starred in the music video for Elle me dit, the first French single by Lebanese singer Mika, and appeared in the play based on Joan Didion's 2005 novel The Year of Magical Thinking in the Théâtre de l'Atelier, Paris. She also starred in Interno Giorno that same year by Tommaso Rossellini, acting in both French and Italian. In 2013, she made a cameo appearance as herself in The Great Beauty.

In 2018, Ardant starred in the Swiss drama film Shock Waves – Diary of My Mind by Ursula Meier. It was screened in the Panorama section at the 68th Berlin International Film Festival. In 2019, Ardant directed the opera Lady Macbeth of Mtsensk at the Greek National Opera.

== Personal life ==
While working on The Woman Next Door, Ardant and Truffaut fell in love, and on 28 September 1983 she gave birth to their daughter Josephine. Truffaut died a year later from a brain tumour.

In August 2007, Ardant expressed her "admiration" for the Red Brigades leader Renato Curcio as a "hero", adding she "considered the Red Brigades phenomenon to be very moving and passionate". For her comments, the actress was sued in the Italian courts by Piero Mazzola, the son of an Italian policeman killed by the Red Brigades. Ardant apologized, saying that she had been ill-informed about Italy's political history.

In 2009, Ardant signed a petition in support of director Roman Polanski. While traveling to a film festival, Polanski had been detained in relation to his 1977 sexual abuse charges. The petition argued that detaining Polanski would undermine the tradition of film festivals as a place for works to be shown "freely and safely", and that arresting filmmakers traveling to neutral countries could open the door "for actions of which no-one can know the effects."

In 2023, Ardant supported her friend Gérard Depardieu when he was accused of rape and sexual assault. When Depardieu stood trial for sexual assault in 2025, she testified in his favor.

== Selected filmography ==
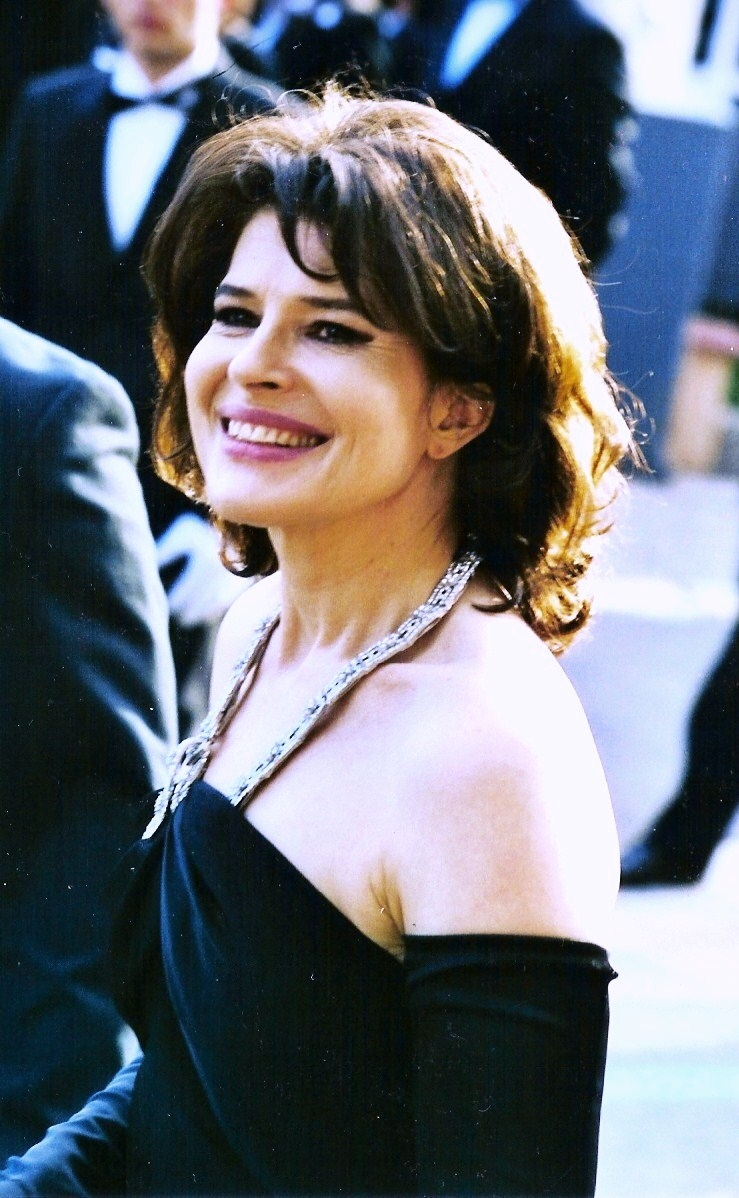
Ardant at the 2005 Cannes Film Festival

Year	Title	Role	Notes
1976	Marie-poupée	Marie-Paule	
1979	The Dogs	Missing Girl	
1981	Les Uns et les Autres	Véronique	
1981	The Woman Next Door	Mathilde Bauchard	Nominated—César Award for Best Actress
1982	Life Is a Bed of Roses	Livia Ceraskier	
1982	Confidentially Yours	Barbara Becker	Nominated—César Award for Best Actress
1983	Swann in Love	Duchesse de Guermantes	
1983	Benvenuta	Benvenuta	
1984	L'Amour à mort	Judith Martignac	
1986	Mélo	Christiane Levesque	
1987	The Family	Adriana	
1988	Love and Fear	Velia	
1989	Australia	Jeanne Gauthier	
1992	Afraid of the Dark	Miriam	
1994	Colonel Chabert	Countess Ferraud	
1994	A Hundred and One Nights	The star who works at night	
1995	Beyond the Clouds	Patricia	
1995	Sabrina	Irene	
1996	Désiré	Odette	
1996	Pédale douce	Evelyne, called Eva	César Award for Best Actress
1996	Ridicule	Madame de Blayac	
1998	Elizabeth	Mary of Guise	
1998	Le Dîner	Flora	
1999	Augustin, King of Kung-Fu	Herself	
1999	Le fils du Français	Anne	
2000	Le Libertin	Madame Therbouche	
2001	Don't Tempt Me	Marina D'Angelo	
2002	8 Women	Pierrette	Nominated—César Award for Best Actress
2002	Callas Forever	Maria Callas	
2003	Nathalie...	Catherine	
2004	El año del diluvio	Sor Consuelo	
2006	Paris, je t'aime	Fanny	
2007	Roman de Gare	Judith Ralitzer	
2007	Il Divo	The wife of the French ambassador	
2008	Hello Goodbye	Gisèle	
2008	The Secrets	Anouk	
2009	Ashes and Blood	(Director)	
2009	Face	The producer/Queen Hérodias	
2011	Interno Giorno	Maria Toricello	
2011	Raspoutine	Empress Alexandra Feodorovna	
2013	Bright Days Ahead	Caroline	Nominated—César Award for Best Actress
2013	The Great Beauty	Cameo appearance as herself	
2013	Cadences obstinées	(Director)	
2014	Casanova Variations	Lucrecia	
2015	Chic!	Alicia Ricosi	
2016	For This Is My Body	The Woman	
2017	Waiting for You	Madeleine Brown	
2017	O Turno da Noite		Short film
2017	Lola Pater	Lola Chekib	
2018	Ma mère est folle	Nina Renner	
2019	Perdrix	Thérèse Perdrix	
2019	La Belle Époque	Marianne Drumond	César Award for Best Supporting Actress
2020	DNA	Caroline	Nominated—César Award for Best Supporting Actress
2021	The Young Lovers	Shauna Loszinsky	Nominated—César Award for Best Actress
2022	The Green Shutters	Jeanne Swann	
2022	The Colors of Fire	Solange Gallinato	
2023	The Palace	Constance Rose Marie de La Valle	
2023	Mr. Blake at Your Service!	Nathalie	
2024	American Star	Anne	
2024	The Opera!	Proserpina	

== Awards and nominations ==
Institution	Category	Year	Work	Result
Berlin International Film Festival	Silver Bear for Outstanding Artistic Achievement (shared with the cast)	2002	8 Women	Won
Cannes Film Festival	Caméra d'Or	2009	Ashes and Blood	Nominated
CinEuphoria Awards	Best Film – National Competition	2018	Le divan de Staline	Nominated
CinEuphoria Awards	Best Director – National Competition	2018	Le divan de Staline	Nominated
CinEuphoria Awards	Best Actress in a Short Film – National Competition	2018	O Turno da Noite	Nominated
CinEuphoria Awards	Top Ten of the Year – National Competition	2018	Le divan de Staline	Won
César Awards	Best Actress	1982	The Woman Next Door	Nominated
César Awards	Best Actress	1984	Confidentially Yours	Nominated
César Awards	Best Actress	1997	Pédale douce	Won
César Awards	Best Actress	2003	8 Women	Nominated
César Awards	Best Actress	2014	Bright Days Ahead	Nominated
César Awards	Best Supporting Actress	2020	La Belle Époque	Won
César Awards	Best Supporting Actress	2021	DNA	Nominated
César Awards	Best Actress	2023	The Young Lovers	Nominated
European Film Awards	Best Actress (shared with the cast)	2002	8 Women	Won
European Film Awards	People's Choice Award for Best European Actress	2004	Nathalie...	Nominated
Globe de Cristal Awards	Best Actress	2020	La Belle Époque	Nominated
Golden Apricot Yerevan International Film Festival	Lifetime Achievement Award	2011	—N/a	Won
Golden Goblets Awards	Career Goblet	1995	—N/a	Won
Hellenic Film Academy Awards	Honorary Award	2015	—N/a	Won
Nastro d'Argento	Best Foreign Actress	1997	The Family	Nominated
Nastro d'Argento	European Silver Ribbon	2004	—N/a	Won
Lumière Awards	Best Actress	1997	Ridicule	Won
Lumière Awards	Best Actress	2020	La Belle Époque	Nominated
Molière Award	Best Actress	1993	L'Aide-mémoire	Nominated
Molière Award	Best Actress	1997	Master Class	Nominated
Moscow International Film Festival	Stanislavsky Award	2003	—N/a	Won
