= Oh Mercy! =

2019 film

- Film poster
- French: Roubaix, une lumière
- Directed by: Arnaud Desplechin
- Written by: Arnaud Desplechin; Léa Mysius
- Based on: Roubaix, commissariat central by Mosco Boucault
- Produced by: Pascal Caucheteux; Grégoire Sorlat
- Starring: Roschdy Zem; Léa Seydoux; Sara Forestier; Antoine Reinartz
- Cinematography: Irina Lubtchansky
- Edited by: Laurence Briaud
- Music by: Grégoire Hetzel
- Production companies: Why Not Productions; Arte France Cinéma
- Distributed by: Le Pacte
- Release dates: 22 May 2019 (Cannes); 21 August 2019 (France)
- Running time: 119 minutes
- Country: France
- Language: French
- Box office: $2,851,541

Oh Mercy! (French: Roubaix, une lumière, lit. 'Roubaix, a light') is a 2019 French crime drama film directed by Arnaud Desplechin. The film was inspired by the 2008 TV documentary Roubaix, commissariat central, directed by Mosco Boucault. It stars Roschdy Zem, Léa Seydoux, Sara Forestier, and Antoine Reinartz. It was selected to compete for the Palme d'Or at the 2019 Cannes Film Festival.

== Plot ==
One Christmas night in Roubaix, the local police chief Daoud, and Louis, a fresh recruit, are confronted with the violent murder of an elderly woman. The victim's two young, female neighbours, Claude and Marie, are arrested.

== Cast ==
- Roschdy Zem as Daoud
- Léa Seydoux as Claude
- Sara Forestier as Marie
- Antoine Reinartz as Louis
- Chloé Simoneau as Judith
- Betty Catroux as De Kayser
- Jérémy Brunet as Aubin
- Stéphane Duquenoy as Benoît
- Philippe Duquesne as Dos Santos
- Anthony Salamone as Kovalki
- Ilyes Bensalem as Farid
- Abdellatif Sedegui as Soufia's father
- Sylvie Moreaux as Soufia's mother
- Diya Chalaoui as Fatia Belkacem
- Bouzid Bouhdida as Soufia's uncle
- Maïssa Taleb as Soufia Duhamel-Hami

== Release ==
The film had its world premiere in the Competition section at the 2019 Cannes Film Festival on 22 May 2019. It was released in France on 21 August 2019.

== Reception ==
=== Critical response ===
On review aggregator website Rotten Tomatoes, the film holds an approval rating of 59% based on 29 reviews, with an average rating of 5.4/10. On Metacritic, the film has a weighted average score of 51 out of 100, based on 9 critics, indicating "mixed or average reviews".

David Ehrlich of IndieWire gave the film a grade of C−, writing, "Forestier and Seydoux are both fantastically desperate as dead end citizens who met each other at a very dangerous time in their lives, but Desplechin fails to make full use of his actors; instead of allowing them to shade in their characters, he pummels the audience into an ambiguous state of forced sympathy." Chuck Bowen of Slant Magazine gave the film 3 out of 4 stars, commenting that "The film's master image is among the greatest images of Desplechin's career: the women, recreating their strangulation of the victim for the police, briefly hold their hands together under the victim's pillow."

=== Accolades ===
Award	Date of ceremony	Category	Recipient(s)	Result	Ref(s)
Festival International du Film Francophone de Namur	4 October 2019	Bayard d'or	Oh Mercy!	Won	
Lumière Awards	27 January 2020	Best Film	Oh Mercy!	Nominated	
Lumière Awards	27 January 2020	Best Director	Arnaud Desplechin	Nominated	
Lumière Awards	27 January 2020	Best Actor	Roschdy Zem	Won	
Lumière Awards	27 January 2020	Best Cinematography	Irina Lubtchansky	Nominated	
Jacques Deray Prize	22 February 2020			Won	
César Award	28 February 2020	Best Film	Oh Mercy!	Nominated	
César Award	28 February 2020	Best Director	Arnaud Desplechin	Nominated	
César Award	28 February 2020	Best Actor	Roschdy Zem	Won	
César Award	28 February 2020	Best Supporting Actress	Sara Forestier	Nominated	
César Award	28 February 2020	Best Adaptation	Arnaud Desplechin and Léa Mysius	Nominated	
César Award	28 February 2020	Best Cinematography	Irina Lubtchansky	Nominated	
César Award	28 February 2020	Best Original Music	Grégoire Hetzel	Nominated	
