= Alexis Manenti =

French film and television actor

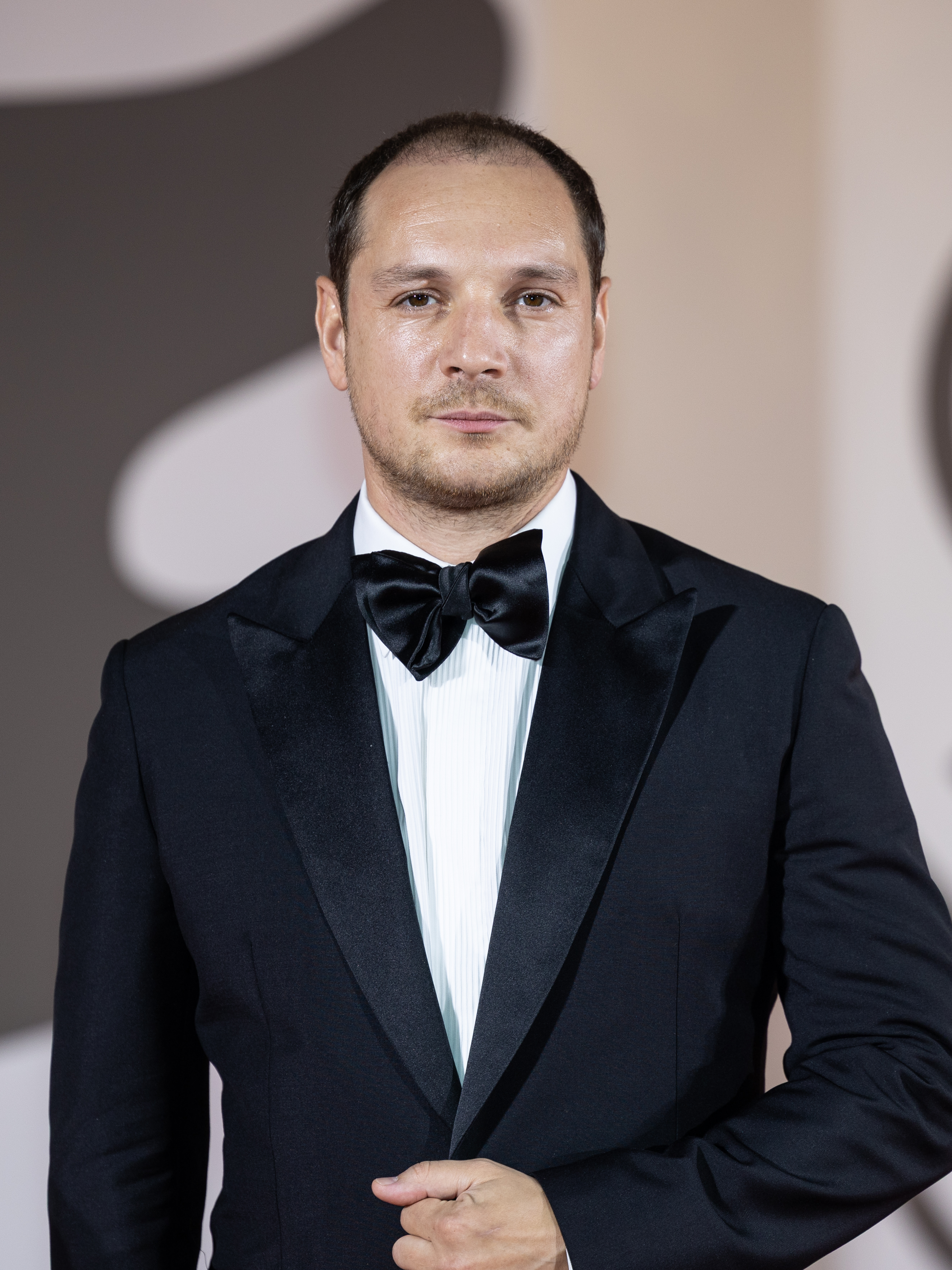
- Manenti at the Venice Film Festival 2024
- Born: 12 February 1982 (age 44)
- Years active: 2014–present

Alexis Manenti (born 12 February 1982) is a French actor and screenwriter, best known for the 2019 film Les Misérables.

== Career ==
He was the winner of the César Award for Most Promising Actor at the 45th César Awards, and the Lumière Award for Best Male Revelation at the 25th Lumière Awards, for his performance in Les Misérables (2019). With co-writers Ladj Ly and Giordano Gederlini, he won the Lumière Award for Best Screenplay, and was nominated for the César Award for Best Original Screenplay and the European Film Award for Best Screenwriter.

== Filmography ==
=== Films ===
Year	English title	Original title	Role	Notes
2014	Mea Culpa		Slobodan	
2015	Vicky		Christophe	
2016	The Stopover	Voir du pays	Jonathan	
2016	Orphan	Orpheline		
2017	Stalin's Couch	Le Divan de Staline	Tchirikov	
2017	Épouse-moi mon pote		Chris	
2018	9 Fingers	9 doigts	Springer	
2018	Just a Breath Away	Dans la brume	Drunk policeman	
2018	The World Is Yours	Le monde est à toi	Uber driver	
2019	Les Misérables		Chris	
2019	Sexfish	Poissonsexe	Éric	
2020	K contraire		David	
2021	Third Grade	CE2		
2022	Love According to Dalva	Dalva		
2022	Athena		Sébastien	
2022	Undercover	Enquête sur un scandale d'État	Alexis Novinard	
2023	Les Indésirables	Bâtiment 5	Pierre	
2023	Guardians of the Formula	Čuvari formule	Georges Mathé	
2023	Karmapolice		Poulet	
2024	The Man Who Could Not Remain Silent	Čovjek koji nije mogao šutjeti	Commander of Beli Orlovi paramilitary	Short film
2024	Maldoror		Luis Catano	
2024	The Mohican	Le Mohican	Joseph Cardelli	
2025	Ad Vitam		Nico	
2026	Le Faux Soir			

=== Television ===
Year	Title	Role	Notes
2015	The Last Panthers	Rajko Popovic	
2015-2018	Les Petits Meurtres d'Agatha Christie	David Krepps	Two episodes
2018	Clash of Futures (1918-1939: Les Rêves brisés de l'entre-deux-guerres)	Dragul	One episode
2019	Apnea (Une île)	Victor	
2020	The Eddy	Zivko	Five episodes
