= Patrick Timsit =

French film director and actor

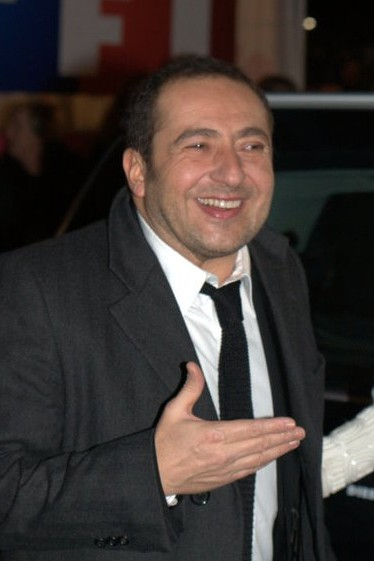
- Born: Algiers, Algeria
- Years active: 1984–present

Patrick Timsit (French pronunciation: [patʁik timˈsit]) is a French comedian, writer and film director. He has been nominated for four César Awards – three times as an actor and once as a writer. He is best known for the French comedy Un indien dans la ville.

In 2006, he participated in Rendez-vous en terre inconnue. He is of Algerian Jewish ancestry.

== César nominations ==
- Best Supporting Actor – La Crise (1992)
- Best Actor – Pédale douce (1996)
- Best Original Screenplay or Adaptation – Pédale douce (1996)
- Best Actor – Le cousin (1997)

== Selected filmography ==
- Sans peur et sans reproche (1988) as Charles VIII of France
- Mayrig (1991) as Garbis
- La Crise (1992) as Michou
- The Monster (1994) as Loris (French dub)
- Little Indian, Big City (1994) as Richard Montignac
- La Belle Verte (1996) as the TV host
- Pedale douce (1996) as Adrien
- Le cousin (1997) as Lahcene "Nounours" Abdelrahmane
- Hercules (1997) as Philoctetes (French dub)
- Marquise (1997) as René "Gros René" Berthelot
- Paparazzi (1998) as Franck
- Quasimodo d'El Paris (1999 – directed) as Quasimodo
- L'Art (délicat) de la séduction (2001) as Etienne
- Atlantis: The Lost Empire (2001) as Gaëtan Moliére (French dub)
- The Car Keys (2003) as himself
- Les 11 commandements (2004) as Toto
- Shark Tale (2004) as Lenny (French dub)
- Azur and Asmar (2006) as Crapoux (voice)
- Dragon Hunters (2008) as Gwizdo (French dub)
- Sur la piste du Marsupilami (2012) as Caporal
- Robin des bois, la véritable histoire (2015) as Alfred
- Gangsterdam (2017) as Ruben's father
- Dalida (2017) as Bruno Coquatrix
- Marie-Francine (2017) as Miguel
- The Last Mercenary (2021) as Commander Jouard
- Brother and Sister (2022) as Zwy
- It Takes Two to Tango (2025) as Antoine's manager
