= Joan of Arc (2019 film) =

2019 film

- Film poster
- French: Jeanne
- Directed by: Bruno Dumont
- Written by: Bruno Dumont
- Produced by: Rachid Bouchareb; Jean Bréhat; Muriel Merlin
- Starring: Lise Leplat Prudhomme
- Cinematography: David Chambille
- Edited by: Basile Belkhiri
- Music by: Christophe
- Production company: 3B Productions
- Distributed by: Les Films du Losange
- Release dates: 18 May 2019 (Cannes); 11 September 2019 (France)
- Running time: 137 minutes
- Country: France
- Language: French

Joan of Arc (French: Jeanne) is a 2019 French drama film directed by Bruno Dumont and starring Lise Leplat Prudhomme. It is the sequel to Jeannette: The Childhood of Joan of Arc (2017). It was screened in the Un Certain Regard section at the 2019 Cannes Film Festival.

== Plot ==
After her triumph against the English army, Joan of Arc is captured by the Burgundians. She is put on trial for heresy.

== Cast ==
- Lise Leplat Prudhomme as Jeanne
- Jean-François Causeret as Monseigneur Pierre Cauchon
- Daniel Dienne as Maître Thomas de Courcelles
- Fabien Fenet as Maître Nicolas L'Oiseleur
- Robert Hanicotte as Messire Jean d'Estivet
- Yves Habert as Maître William Haiton
- Fabrice Luchini as Charles VII of France
- Christophe as Maître Guillaume Evrard
- Julien Manier as Gilles de Rais

== Production ==
The film was partially shot at the Amiens Cathedral in Amiens.

== Release ==
The film had its premiere in the Un Certain Regard section at the 2019 Cannes Film Festival on 18 May 2019. It was released in France on 11 September 2019.

== Reception ==
=== Critical reception ===
On review aggregator website Rotten Tomatoes, the film holds an approval rating of 57% based on 35 reviews, with an average rating of 5.9/10. The website's critics consensus reads: "Joan of Arc (Jeanne) definitely offers a different take on this oft-told tale, although it isn't always able to deliver absorbing drama." On Metacritic, which assigns a normalized rating to reviews, the film has a weighted average score of 50 out of 100, based on eleven critics, indicating "mixed or average reviews".

Peter Bradshaw of The Guardian gave the film 2 out of 5 stars, writing, "I found this film ultimately exasperating: not quite funny enough to be funny, or serious enough to be serious, or passionate enough to be about the passion of Joan of Arc." Sam C. Mac of Slant Magazine praised Lise Leplat Prudhomme's performance, commenting that she "gives an extraordinarily committed, and convincing, performance as the teenaged Joan." Guy Lodge of Variety wrote, "Imposing by any generational measure, Prudhomme's fervid, unflinching performance puts some blood and guts into an otherwise stony, hyper-measured exercise."

=== Accolades ===
Award	Year of ceremony	Category	Recipient(s)	Result	Ref(s)
Cannes Film Festival	2019	Special Mention: Un Certain Regard	Joan of Arc	Won	
Louis Delluc Prize	2019	Best Film	Joan of Arc	Won	
Lumière Awards	2020	Best Female Revelation	Lise Leplat Prudhomme	Nominated	
Lumière Awards	2020	Best Music	Christophe	Nominated	
César Awards	2020	Best Costume Design	Alexandra Charles	Nominated	
