= Damien Bonnard =

French actor (born 1978)

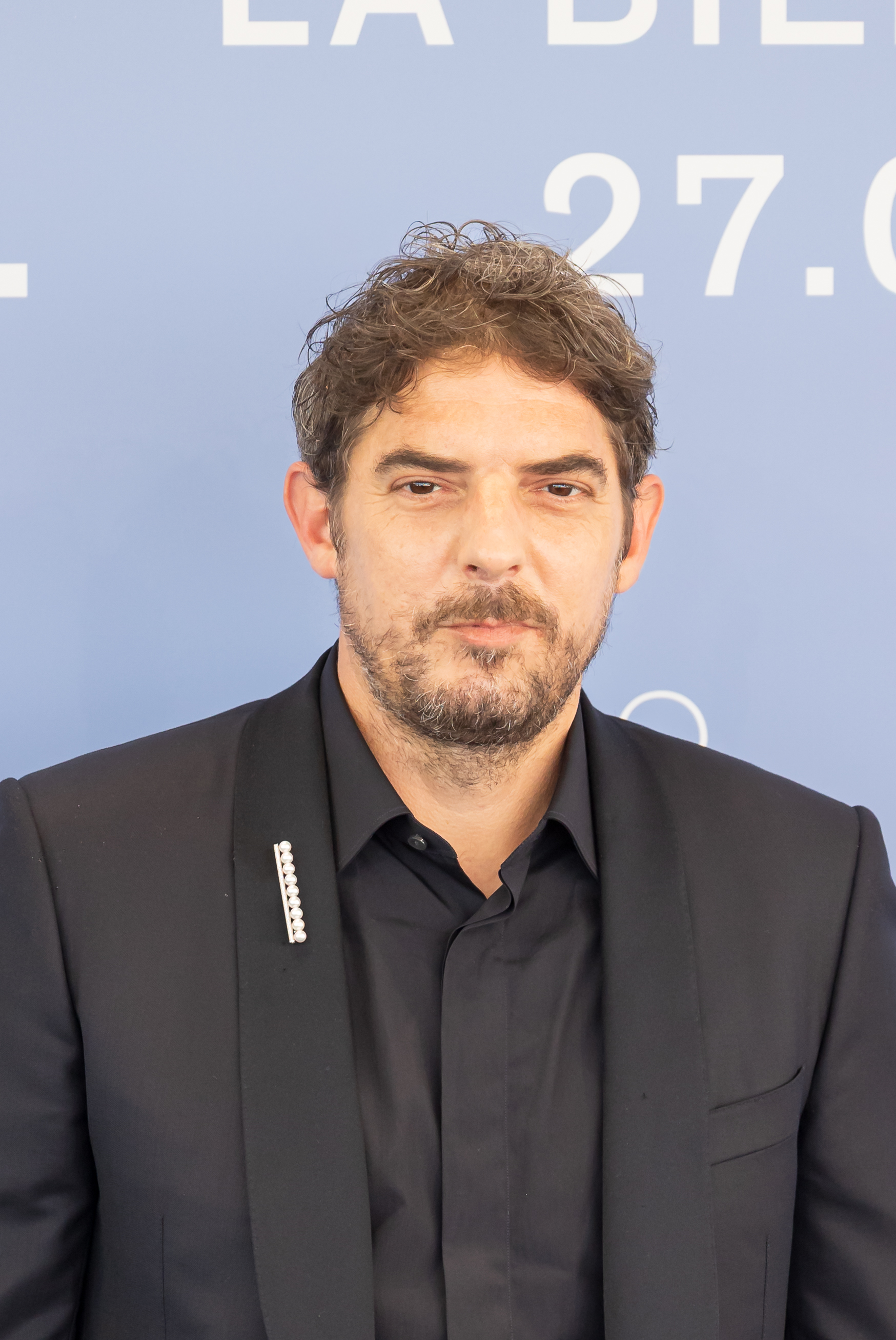
- Bonnard in 2025
- Born: 22 July 1978 (age 48); Alès, Gard, France
- Occupation: Actor
- Years active: 2009–present

Damien Bonnard (born 22 July 1978) is a French actor. Most known for his work in Staying Vertical (2016), The Trouble with You (2019) and Les Misérables (2019), for which he received three César Awards nominations.

== Filmography ==
Year	Title	Role	Director	Notes
2009	La Mort de Philippe Sella	Damien	Vincent Mariette	Short
2010	Outside the Law	Cabaret employee	Rachid Bouchareb	
2010	The Clink of Ice	Yob 2	Bertrand Blier	
2010	Rencontre	Lucas	Shane de La Brosse	Short
2010	L'Envers du ciel!	The colleague	Eric Lavelle	Short
2011	Low Cost	Passenger	Maurice Barthélemy	
2011	Blanc	The man	Lucas Delangle	Short
2011	Je suis, tu étais, nous serons	Thomas	Romain Julien	Short
2012	Augustine	Son Dumonteux	Alice Winocour	
2012	A Perfect Plan	Romain	Pascal Chaumeil	
2012	Orléans		Virgil Vernier	Short
2012	Faux frères	Steven	Lucas Delangle	Short
2012	Un week-end à Paris	The father	Benjamin Cohenca	Short
2012	Le Monde à l'envers	The animator	Sylvain Desclous	Short
2012	La Viande et le mulet	Fred	Ellen Gerentes	Short
2012	Trafics	Ronchart	Olivier Barma	TV series (3 episodes)
2013	La Pièce manquante	The trainer	Nicolas Birkenstock	
2013	Chaource	Simon	Noémie Landreau	Short
2013	Rétention	The OFII speaker	Thomas Kruithof	Short
2013	Je sens plus la vitesse	The barman	Joanne Delachair	Short
2013	The Ballad of Billy the Kid	Singer	Rodolphe Pauly	Short
2013	L'Instant fragile de nos retrouvailles	Alex	Xavier Champagnac	Short
2013	Calme et clair, vue dégagée, pas de vis-à-vis	Josef	Louis Dodin	Short
2013	La Famille Katz	The educator	Arnauld Mercadier	TV series (1 episode)
2013	Nicolas Le Floch	The barker	Philippe Bérenger	TV series (1 episode)
2014	Mercuriales	The guardian	Virgil Vernier	
2014	Mon héros	Rémi	Sylvain Desclous	Short
2014	Après eux	The party planner	Antonin Desse	Short
2014	Petit lapin	Damien	Hubert Viel	Short
2014	Think of Me	Guard	Shanti Masud	Short
2014	Ce monde ancien	Mokrane	Idir Serghine	Short
2014	Murders at Rouen	Gabriel	Christian Bonnet	TV movie
2015	L'Astragale	Young cop	Brigitte Sy	
2015	Through the Air	A worker	Fred Grivois	
2015	Les Filles	The instructor	Alice Douard	Short
2015	La Terre penche	Lucas	Christelle Lheureux	Short
2015	Les bêtes sauvages		Grégoire Motte & Éléonore Saintagnan	Short
2015	Papa, Alexandre, Maxime & Eduardo	Maxime	Simon Masnay	Short
2015	Paris	Dany	Gilles Bannier	TV series (2 episodes)
2016	Vendeur	Lilian	Sylvain Desclous	
2016	The Stopover	The lieutenant	Delphine and Muriel Coulin	
2016	Staying Vertical	Léo	Alain Guiraudie	Lumière Award for Best Male Revelation, Nominated - César Award for Most Promising Actor
2016	La Ville bleue	Pierre	Armel Hostiou	Short
2016	Loin de chez nous	Ben	Frédéric Scotlande	TV series (10 episodes)
2017	9 Fingers (French: 9 Doigts)	Kurtz	F. J. Ossang	
2017	Dunkirk	French Soldier	Christopher Nolan	
2017	Thirst Street	Jérôme	Nathan Silver	
2017	Based on a True Story	The perchman	Roman Polanski	
2017	Viré	Polo	Hugo Rousselin	Short
2017	Les Misérables	Laurent	Ladj Ly	Short
2018	The Trouble with You	Louis	Pierre Salvadori	Nominated - César Award for Best Supporting Actor
2018	Cross	Serge	Idir Serghine	Short
2018	The Night of the Plastic Bags	Marc-Antoine	Gabriel Harel	Short
2019	Curiosa	The publisher	Lou Jeunet	
2019	The Wolf's Call	Officer SNLE	Antonin Baudry	
2019	Blanche comme neige	Pierre / François	Anne Fontaine	
2019	Les Misérables	Stéphane	Ladj Ly	Nominated - César Award for Best Actor
2019	An Officer and a Spy	Desvernine	Roman Polanski	
2019	Bus N		Cloé Bailly	Short
2019	Seules les bêtes		Dominik Moll	
2021	The French Dispatch	A policeman	Wes Anderson	
2022	Bleat	Man	Yorgos Lanthimos	Short
2022	The Sixth Child	Franck	Léopold Legrand	
2023	A Silence	Pierre	Joachim Lafosse	
2023	Poor Things	Father	Yorgos Lanthimos	
2024	Block Pass	David	Antoine Chevrollier	
2024	Niki	Jean Tinguely	Céline Sallette	
2024	Serpent's Path	Albert Bacheret	Kiyoshi Kurosawa	
2024	Three Friends	Thomas Duval	Emmanuel Mouret	
2025	Six Days in Spring	Luc	Joachim Lafosse	
2025	The Site	Vincent	Akihiro Hata	
2026	The Hunt		Cédric Anger	TV miniseries
2026	Redemptions (Rédemptions)		Luc Picard	
