= Pédale douce =

Pédale douce (Soft Pedal)
- DVD cover
- Directed by: Gabriel Aghion
- Written by: Gabriel Aghion; Pierre Palmade; Patrick Timsit
- Starring: Patrick Timsit; Fanny Ardant; Richard Berry; Michèle Laroque
- Cinematography: Fabio Conversi
- Edited by: Luc Barnier
- Music by: Philippe Chopin; Gaetano Donizetti
- Production companies: TF1 Films Production; MDG; Canal+
- Distributed by: AMLF
- Release date: 27 March 1996
- Running time: 100 minutes
- Country: France
- Language: French
- Budget: $5 million
- Box office: $26 million

Pédale douce (Soft Pedal) is a 1996 French comedy film directed by Gabriel Aghion. Fanny Ardant won the 1997 César Award for Best Actress for her performance as Eva.

== Plot ==
Adrien works in an advertising agency in the day and at night he becomes the queen of a gay bar, run by his best friend, the seductive Eva. When Alexandre Agut, a major client of Adrien, wants to get to know him, he asks Eva to pose as his wife. Everything gets carried away when Alexandre falls in love with her.

== Cast ==
- Patrick Timsit - Adrien Aymar
- Fanny Ardant - Evelyne, called Eva
- Richard Berry - Alexandre Hagutte
- Michèle Laroque - Marie Hagutte
- Jacques Gamblin - André Lemoine
- Dominique Besnehard - Riki
- Christian Bujeau - Dr. Séverine
- Boris Terral - Cyril

== Awards and nominations ==
Year	Award	Category	Recipient	Result
1997	César Award	Best Actress	Fanny Ardant	Won
1997	César Award	Best Actor	Patrick Timsit	Nominated
1997	César Award	Best Supporting Actor	Jacques Gamblin	Nominated
1997	César Award	Best Supporting Actress	Michèle Laroque	Nominated
1997	César Award	Best Film	Gabriel Aghion	Nominated
1997	César Award	Best Original Screenplay or Adaptation	Gabriel Aghion; Patrick Timsit	Nominated

== Sequel ==
A sequel Pédale dure (Pédale douce 3 : Elles sont tellement folles qu'elles ont oublié de faire le 2!) with Gérard Darmon, Michèle Laroque and Dany Boon was released in 2004 to negative reviews.
