= Arthur Rambo =

Drama film directed by Laurent Cantet

- Directed by: Laurent Cantet
- Written by: Fanny Burdino; Laurent Cantet; Samuel Doux
- Produced by: Marie-Ange Luciani
- Starring: Rabah Nait Oufella; Antoine Reinartz
- Cinematography: Pierre Milon
- Edited by: Mathilde Muyard
- Music by: Chloé Thévenin
- Production companies: France 2 Cinéma; Les Films de Pierre; Memento Films Production
- Distributed by: Memento Films
- Release dates: 11 September 2021 (TIFF); 20 September 2021 (SSIFF)
- Running time: 87 minutes
- Country: France
- Language: French
- Budget: €4.3 million; (≃$4.2 million)
- Box office: $162,902

Arthur Rambo is a 2021 French drama film directed by Laurent Cantet. The film stars Rabah Nait Oufella as Karim D., freely inspired by the story of Mehdi Meklat. The cast also includes Antoine Reinartz, Sofian Khammes, Anaël Snoek and Aleksandra Yermak. The film entered production in fall 2019. It premiered at the 2021 Toronto International Film Festival in the Platform Prize program. It had its European premiere in the Golden Shell competition at the 69th San Sebastián International Film Festival. The film was Cantet's final feature film as a director before his death in April 2024.

== Plot ==
Karim D. is a young writer riding success with the new novel The Landing (French: Débarquement). A rare Arab rising star in Paris' intellectual hothouse, his social life shunts between glittering literary cocktails and hanging with his old friends from the banlieues. But Karim's teen online identity under the alias Arthur Rambo is revealed, a nickname in which a poet (Arthur Rimbaud) and a rejected veteran (Rambo) coexist, and the two worlds collide. Where Karim is now a nuanced author, "Arthur Rambo" was profane and blindly provocative, tweeting out hate-fuelled homophobic and anti-Semitic messages to get a rise out of bourgeois France.

== Cast ==
- Rabah Nait Oufella as Karim D.
- Antoine Reinartz as Nicolas
- Sofian Khammes as Rachid
- Anaël Snoek as Clio Balan

== Release ==
The film premièred at the Toronto International Film Festival on 11 September 2021 and in Europe at the 69th San Sebastián International Film Festival on 20 September 2021. It was first theatrically released in France on 2 February 2022.

== Reception ==
=== Box office ===
Arthur Rambo grossed $0 in the United States and Canada, and a worldwide total of $162,902, against a production budget of about $4.2 million.

=== Critical response ===
On review aggregator Rotten Tomatoes, the film holds an approval rating of 56% based on 9 reviews, with an average rating of 7/10.
