= The Specials (2019 film) =

2019 film

- Film poster
- French: Hors normes
- Directed by: Éric Toledano; Olivier Nakache
- Written by: Éric Toledano; Olivier Nakache
- Produced by: Nicolas Duval Adassovsky
- Starring: Vincent Cassel; Reda Kateb
- Cinematography: Antoine Sanier
- Edited by: Dorian Rigal-Ansous
- Distributed by: Gaumont
- Release date: 25 May 2019 (Cannes)
- Running time: 114 minutes
- Country: France
- Language: French
- Budget: $12.8 million
- Box office: $19.4 million

The Specials (French: Hors normes) is a 2019 French drama film directed by Éric Toledano and Olivier Nakache. It was screened out of competition at the 2019 Cannes Film Festival. The film is inspired by the true story of Stéphane Benhamou and Daoud Tatou.

== Plot ==
Bruno (Vincent Cassel) runs an organization that helps autistic people by finding job placements and activities for them outside of the confines of an institutionalized hospital setting, along with Malik (Reda Kateb), who certifies teenagers from Paris's rough neighborhoods to care for autistic patients. Bruno continually hires more staff despite his organization's financial problems. His organization is also under investigation by the social affairs inspector for operating without a license. Bruno gets Joseph, his oldest patient, a job at a washing machine manufacturer, but Joseph struggles with the temptation to pull fire alarms on metro trains during his commute.

One of Malik's students, Dylan, works with a patient named Valentin. Dylan struggles with appreciating the value of the program and is disrespectful toward Malik.

== Cast ==
- Vincent Cassel as Bruno Haroche
- Reda Kateb as Malik
- Hélène Vincent as Hélène
- Bryan Mialoundama as Dylan
- Alban Ivanov as Menahem
- Benjamin Lesieur as Joseph
- Marco Locatelli as Valentin
- Catherine Mouchet as Doctor Ronssin
- Frédéric Pierrot & Suliane Brahim as Inspectors IGAS
- Lyna Khoudri as Ludivine
- Aloïse Sauvage as Shirelle

== Reception ==
The film received highly positive reviews. The Specials has an approval rating of 82% on review aggregator website Rotten Tomatoes, based on 11 reviews, and an average rating of 7.4/10.
