= DNA (2020 film) =

2020 film

- Theatrical release poster
- Directed by: Maïwenn
- Written by: Maïwenn; Mathieu Demy
- Produced by: Pascal Caucheteux
- Starring: Fanny Ardant; Louis Garrel; Dylan Robert; Marine Vacth; Caroline Chaniolleau; Alain Françon; Florent Lacger; Henri-Noël Tabary; Omar Marwan; Maïwenn
- Cinematography: Sylvestre Dedise
- Edited by: Laure Gardette
- Music by: Stephen Warbeck
- Production companies: Why Not Productions; Les Films de Batna; Arte France Cinéma
- Distributed by: Le Pacte
- Release dates: 11 September 2020 (Deauville); 19 May 2021 (France)
- Running time: 90 minutes
- Country: France
- Language: French
- Box office: $2 million

DNA (French: ADN) is a 2020 French drama film directed by Maïwenn, from a screenplay by Maïwenn and Mathieu Demy. It stars Fanny Ardant, Louis Garrel, Dylan Robert, Marine Vacth, Caroline Chaniolleau, Alain Françon, Florent Lacger, Henri-Noël Tabary, Omar Marwan and Maïwenn.

The film had its world premiere at the Deauville Film Festival on 11 September 2020. It was released in France on 19 May 2021, by Le Pacte.

== Plot ==
After the death of her grandfather, a fighter for Algerian independence who then settled and raised a family in France, Neige's life seems empty. She has broken up with her man, is on execrable terms with her father and mother, who are separated, and has little time for her siblings. She starts pondering how far her problems and those of her family are due to their mixed ancestry and to the ensuing clash of loyalties between the two very different societies of France and Algeria. A DNA test reveals nothing useful and in depression she stops eating. Taken to hospital, she has a revelation and, discharging herself, travels to Algiers. There she obtains an Algerian passport and sits happily in the street, looking at people among whom she thinks she belongs.

== Cast ==
- Maïwenn as Neige
- Louis Garrel as François, Neige's ex-lover
- Marine Vacth as Lilah, Neige's sister
- Fanny Ardant as Caroline, Neige's mother
- Alain Françon as Pierre, Neige's father
- Omar Marwan as Emir Fellah, Neige's grandfather
- Dylan Robert as Kevin
- Caroline Chaniolleau as Françoise
- Florent Lacger as Ali
- Henri-Noël Tabary as Matteo

== Release ==
The film was set to premiere at the Cannes Film Festival in May 2020, however the festival was canceled due to the COVID-19 pandemic. It had its world premiere at the Deauville Film Festival on 11 September 2020. Shortly after, Netflix acquired distribution rights to the film in select territories including the United States, Canada, United Kingdom, New Zealand, South Africa and the Middle East. It was scheduled to be released in France on 28 October 2020, by Le Pacte. However, the film was pulled from the schedule due to theater closures due to the pandemic. It was released in the United States on 26 December 2020. It was released in France on 19 May 2021.

== Reception ==
DNA holds an 86% approval rating on review aggregator website Rotten Tomatoes, based on seven reviews, with an average of 7.1/10.
