= Lourdes (2019 film) =

- Directed by: Thierry Demaizière; Alban Teurlai
- Written by: Sixtine Léon-Dufour; Jeanne Aptekman; Thierry Demaizière
- Release date: 2019
- Country: France
- Language: French

Lourdes is a 2019 documentary film directed by Thierry Demaizière and Alban Teurlai. The documentary was nominated for the César Award as well as the Lumière Award for the Best Documentary category.

== Overview ==
The documentary provides an intimate portrait of individuals and families in marginalized communities, those with debilitating medical conditions and terminal diagnoses seeking solace at the Lourdes sanctuary site. Interviews reveal a past filled with suicide attempts, struggles with gender identity, and guilt-ridden parents overwhelmed by the sense of responsibility over their struggling children.

== Reception ==
The documentary received widespread critical acclaim. Robert Abele of the Los Angeles Times praised the documentary stating, the core "is defined less by sightseeing religiosity (even as the basilica, the grotto, the baths, and torchlight processions are well represented) than by an interest in humans as an innately lost and sad, yet ineffably questing and empathetic tribe." Frank Scheck of The Hollywood Reporter said that, "The focus on afflicted individuals provides the film with a strong emotional component, abetted by Pierre Aviat's powerful musical score" but also noted that the film was more "immersive rather than informative."
