= Swann Arlaud =

French actor (born 1981)

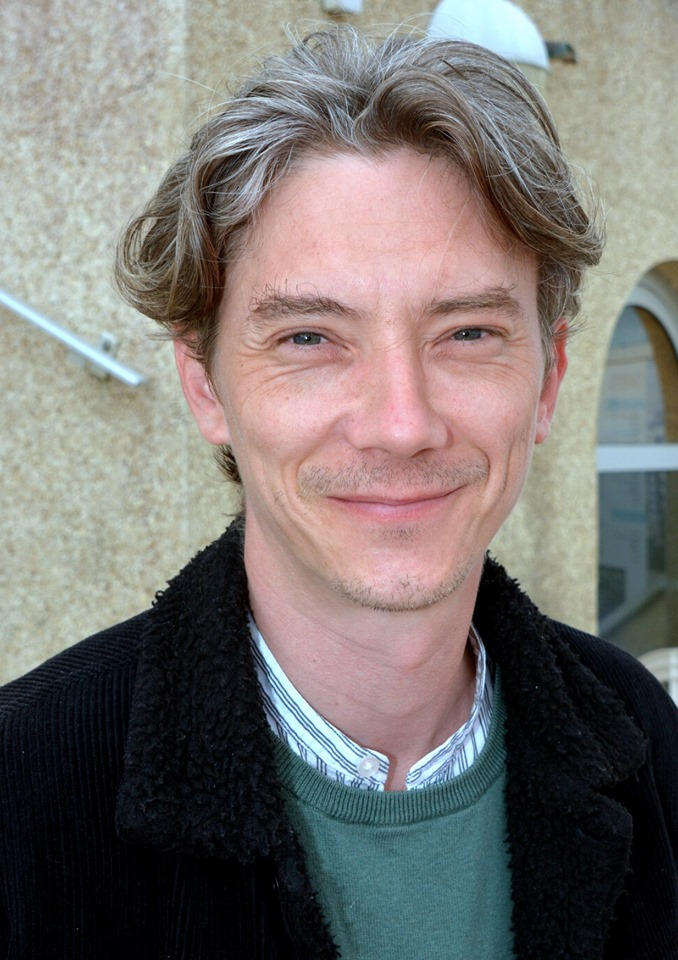
- Arlaud in 2019
- Born: 25 March 1981 (age 45); Fontenay-aux-Roses, France
- Occupation: Actor
- Years active: 1987–present
- Children: 1

Swann Arlaud (born 25 March 1981) is a French actor. He has appeared in films such as Romantics Anonymous (2010), Elles (2011), Les Anarchistes (2015), The Wakhan Front (2015), Baden Baden (2016), Bloody Milk (2017), By the Grace of God (2019), Valiant Hearts (2021), and Anatomy of a Fall (2023). Arlaud has won three César Awards. He won the César Award for Best Actor for Bloody Milk in 2018, and the César Award for Best Supporting Actor for both By the Grace of God in 2020 and for Anatomy of a Fall in 2024.

== Early life ==
Arlaud's parents are production designer Yan Arlaud and actress and casting director Tatiana Vialle. His grandparents are actor Max Vialle and singer-songwriter Sonia Laroze. Arlaud has two younger half siblings, Tobias and Galathée Nuytten; their father is cinematographer Bruno Nuytten. He was named after the character Charles Swann, from Marcel Proust's novel In Search Of Lost Time.

== Career ==
Arlaud began his acting career as a child when he was cast in a play directed by his mother. Arlaud didn't consider himself an actor at first, auditioning for television roles to earn money.

Arlaud debuted as a director with the short films Venerman (2016) and Zorey (2021), both co-written with his mother Tatiana Vialle, the latter premiered at the 2021 Cannes Film Festival.

In 2018, Arlaud won the César Award for Best Actor for his role of Pierre in Bloody Milk. He also wore a white ribbon in support of the MeToo movement at the ceremony.

In 2020, Arlaud won the César Award for Best Supporting Actor for playing a child sex abuse survivor in By the Grace of God.

In 2023, Arlaud played lawyer Vincent in Justine Triet's legal thriller Anatomy of a Fall, for which he won another César Award for Best Supporting Actor.

In June 2024, Arlaud was invited to become a member of the Academy of Motion Picture Arts and Sciences.

== Personal life ==
Arlaud has a son, Solal, with French cinematographer Sarah Boutin, with whom he worked in the short film Venerman (2016). His name comes from the novel Belle du Seigneur.

In February 2020, Arlaud supported actress Adèle Haenel's gesture of leaving the ceremony of the 2020 César Awards after Roman Polanski won the award for Best Director.

In October 2023, alongside other French artists like directors Justine Triet, Arthur Harari, Céline Sciamma and actress Adèle Haenel, Arlaud signed an open letter published in the newspaper l'Humanité demanding a ceasefire and an end to the killing of civilians amid the 2023 Israeli invasion of the Gaza Strip and for a humanitarian corridor into Gaza to be established for humanitarian aid. Alongside Anatomy of a Fall co-star Milo Machado-Graner, Arlaud wore a pin with the Palestinian flag in support of the Palestinian people at the 96th Academy Awards ceremony on 10 March 2024.

In January 2024, in the context of sexual assault accusations against actor Gérard Depardieu, Arlaud signed a petition expressing support for the victims.

In June 2024, Arlaud signed a petition addressed to French President Emmanuel Macron demanding France to officially recognize the State of Palestine.

== Filmography ==
=== As actor ===
Year	Title	Role	Notes
1987	Jeux d'artifices		
1992	La Révolte des enfants	Lucien	
1994	Bête de scène		Short film
2004	PJ	Luc	TV series
2005	D'Artagnan et les Trois Mousquetaires	A musketeer	Telefilm
2005	Les Monos	Double L	TV series
2005	Groupe flag	The student	TV series
2005	Les Âmes grises	A soldier	
2005	L'Ordre du temple solaire	Patrick Vuarnet	Telefilm
2006	Le Temps des porte-plumes	Étienne	
2006	Les Aristos	A good looking man	
2006	Femmes de loi	Jérôme Caubert	TV series
2007	PJ	Pierrick	TV series
2007	Reporters	Monteur de Thomas	TV series
2007	Sur le fil	Fabrice Andréani	TV series
2008	Paris enquêtes criminelles	Rémi Royer	TV series
2008	A Simple Heart	Paul Aubain	
2008	Spiral	Steph	TV series
2008	Central Nuit	Ludo Fortin	TV series
2009	Extase	Hugo	
2009	Réfractaire	Ady	
2009	La Femme invisible	The trainee researcher	
2009	Le Bel Âge	François	
2009	Nicolas Le Floch	Jean Galaine	TV series
2009	The Last Flight	Duclos	
2010	Le Repenti	Jérémie	Telefilm
2010	The Round Up	Weismann	
2010	The Extraordinary Adventures of Adèle Blanc-Sec	The Élysée crier	
2010	Belle Épine	Jean-Pierre	
2010	Black Heaven	Dragon	
2010	Les Bleus	Vincent Mora	TV series
2010	Contes et nouvelles du XIXe siècle	The young merchant	TV series
2010	Romantics Anonymous	Antoine	
2011	Face	The deserter	Short film
2011	Alexis Ivanovitch vous êtes mon héros	Alex	Short film
2011	Xanadu	Lapo Valadine	TV series
2011	Elles	A young client	
2011	Ne nous soumets pas à la tentation	Stéphan	
2011	A quoi tu joues ?	Benoît	Short film
2012	L'Homme qui rit	Sylvain	
2012	La Joie de vivre	Lazare	Telefilm
2012	Crawl	Martin	
2012	Une place	Denis	Short film
2013	Chat	The young man	Short film
2013	Lazare	Virgile	Short film
2013	Murders at	Loïc	TV series - episode Meurtres à Saint-Malo
2013	Age of Uprising: The Legend of Michael Kohlhaas	The Baron	
2013	Nous sommes tous des êtres penchés	Paul	Short film
2013	Alibi	The Gypsy	Short film
2014	Get Well Soon	Camille	
2014	Bouboule	Pat	
2015	Paris	Simon	TV series
2015	En immersion	The Chemist	TV miniseries
2015	Elixir	André	
2015	Les Anarchistes	Elisée Mayer	Nominated—César Award for Most Promising Actor
2015	The Wakhan Front	Jérémie Lernowski	
2015	La Dernière Ballade		Short film
2016	Baden Baden	Simon	
2016	The End	The young man	
2016	Goliath	Nico	Short film
2016	La Prunelle de mes yeux	Nicolai	
2016	A Woman's Life	Julien de Lamare	
2017	Bloody Milk (Petit Paysan)	Pierre Chavanges	César Award for Best Actor; Nominated—Globes de Cristal Award for Best Actor; Nominated—Lumière Award for Best Actor
2017	Gros chagrin	Jean (voice)	Short film
2018	A Clever Crook	François Albagnac, Bertrand ou Antoine	
2019	By the Grace of God	Emmanuel Thomassin	César Award for Best Supporting Actor; Nominated—Lumière Award for Best Actor
2019	Escape from Raqqa	Sylvain Henri	
2019	The Swallows of Kabul	Mohsen	animation - voice
2019	The Bare Necessity	Pierre Perdrix	
2019	L'aventure Atomique	The Scientist	Short film
2020	How I Became a Super Hero	Naja	
2021	I Want to Talk About Duras	Yann Andréa	
2021	Valiant Hearts	The curator	
2022	About Joan	Nathan Verra	
2022	Beating Sun	Max	
2023	L'établi	Robert Linhart	
2023	Anatomy of a Fall	Maître Vincent Renzi	César Award for Best Supporting Actor
2024	In the Shadows (Dans l'ombre)	César Casalonga	TV Miniseries
2025	Sukkwan Island	Tom	
2025	The Great Arch (L'Inconnu de la Grande Arche)	Paul Andreu	
2025	Arco	Iris' father, Mikki	Voice
2025	La Condition	André	Nominated—Lumière Award for Best Actor
2025	The Stranger (L'Étranger)	Aumônnier prison	
2026	A Man of His Time (Notre Salut)	Henri Marre	

=== As filmmaker ===
Year	Title	Notes
2002	Tolérance Zéro	Short film
2016	Venerman	Short film; co-director
2021	Zorey	Short film; director, co-writer
	La Catastrophe	Full-length film; director, writer

== Theatre ==
Year	Title	Director	Notes
2010	Une femme à Berlin	Tatiana Vialle	Théâtre du Rond-Point
2013	En réunion	Patrice Kerbrat	Théâtre du Petit Montparnasse
2013	Prendre le risque d'aller mieux	Tatiana Vialle	Ciné 13 Théâtre
2022	Exécuteur 14	Tatiana Vialle	Théâtre 14
2025	Trahisons	Tatiana Vialle	Théâtre de l'Œuvre
