= Les Misérables (2019 film) =

French crime thriller film by Ladj Ly

- Film poster
- Directed by: Ladj Ly
- Screenplay by: Ladj Ly; Giordano Gederlini; Alexis Manenti
- Based on: Les Misérables by Ladj Ly
- Produced by: Toufik Ayadi; Christophe Barral
- Starring: Damien Bonnard; Alexis Manenti; Djebril Zonga; Issa Percia; Al-Hassan Ly; Steve Tientcheu; Almany Kanoute; Nizar Ben Fatma
- Cinematography: Julien Poupard
- Edited by: Flora Volpeliere
- Music by: Pink Noise
- Production companies: SRAB Films; Rectangle Productions; Lyly Films; Canal+; Ciné+; Arte; Wild Bunch; CNC
- Distributed by: Le Pacte
- Release dates: 15 May 2019 (Cannes); 20 November 2019 (France)
- Running time: 104 minutes
- Country: France
- Languages: French; English
- Budget: €2.08 million; (≃$2.5 million)
- Box office: $54.6 million

Les Misérables is a 2019 French crime thriller film directed by Ladj Ly in his full-length feature directorial debut, from a screenplay by Ly, Giordano Gederlini and Alexis Manenti, based on Ly's 2017 short film of the same name. Manenti stars alongside Damien Bonnard, Djebril Zonga, Issa Percia, Al-Hassan Ly, Steve Tientcheu, Almany Kanoute and Nizar Ben Fatma.

The film, set in the commune of Montfermeil in the aftermath of the 2018 FIFA World Cup, is based on a real-life occurrence of police violence which took place in the city on 14 October 2008, and was observed and filmed by Ly. The story follows several characters within the commune, as a theft from a teenager spirals into the threat of a large crisis. The film's title is a reference to the Victor Hugo 1862 novel of the same name, written in Montfermeil and partially set in it; in the novel, Montfermeil is also the setting of the meeting of Jean Valjean and Cosette, a girl abused by her adoptive parents. The film depicts abuses against poor citizens, especially teenagers of sub-Saharan African or Maghrebi ethnicities, thus stressing the continuity in the fate of the poor in Montfermeil.

It had its world premiere on 15 May 2019 at the Cannes Film Festival, where it won the Jury Prize. It was released in France on 20 November 2019 and received critical acclaim, earning twelve nominations at the César Awards and winning four including Best Film. Among other honors, it was selected as the French entry for the Best International Feature Film at the 92nd Academy Awards, eventually achieving the nomination.

== Plot ==
The film begins with images of the crowd in Paris celebrating the victory of the French team at the 2018 FIFA World Cup on the Avenue des Champs-Élysées, perceived and celebrated in France as a moment of brotherhood among people of different social classes, ethnicities, and backgrounds.

Soon after, Stéphane Ruiz, a police officer who recently moved to Paris and joined the anti-crime brigade, is assigned to work with squad leader Chris and brigadier Gwada on duty in the nearby city of Montfermeil. Chris often aggressively abuses his power on young people, with Gwada complacent in that abuse; while feeling unease, Stéphane doesn't interfere. Meanwhile, Issa, a known juvenile delinquent, steals Johnny, a lion cub, from a circus, causing its owner Zorro to go to the local community leader known as "the Mayor" and threaten to return with firearms if Johnny is not returned. Chris and his squadron are tasked with finding and retrieving the cub.

One of Issa's friends takes a picture of Issa with the cub and posts it on Instagram, leading Chris to find out that Issa is the culprit. They chase, capture, and handcuff him, but he claims that the cub had run away. Issa's friends then attack the three officers, throwing things at them to stop them from taking Issa in. When Issa tries to run away, Gwada, having accidentally tear-gassed himself during the chase, shoots him in the face with a flash-ball. Issa's friends scatter, but the squadron realizes that they have been filmed by a drone, which escapes. While Stéphane wants to take a badly wounded Issa to a hospital, Chris and Gwada refuse, and instead, the trio take him with them in their search for the drone's owner.

The trio arrives at a local neighborhood contact of Chris, leaving Issa in their care and using information given to them by that contact to find Buzz, the person the drone belongs to, forcing him to flee before he can upload the video. Buzz, who still carries the drone's memory card, escapes the squadron and takes shelter with Salah, a restaurant owner and key member of the local Islamic community. Both the squadron and the Mayor, having found out, arrive at Salah's restaurant. After a tense confrontation during which Chris attempts to illegally arrest Buzz, Ruiz convinces Salah to give him the memory card, claiming that Issa's shooting was just an accident.

After recovering Issa and the cub (which happened to be spotted near them), the squadron takes the two to the circus. Although Issa is made to apologize, Zorro attempts to lock him as well as the cub inside a cage with a lion, scaring Issa into wetting himself and almost making Stéphane shoot the lion until Issa is eventually let go. Deciding that Issa has learned his lesson, Chris drops him off and warns him not to tell anyone what happened and, if asked about his injury, to say that he slipped and fell. In the evening, the characters involved in that day's event seemingly return to their normal lives, some with visible signs of distress and doubt. Issa, who had been told earlier that his father did not want him back home because of his behavior, sits alone on a ruined couch, traumatized. Later that night, Ruiz meets Gwada in a bar and tells him that he knows that a flash-ball cannot be fired by accident, and that Gwada had therefore intentionally shot Issa. Gwada blames his stress and the group for overwhelming him, and Stéphane, while unconvinced, leaves Gwada with the card, telling him to "do what you gotta do."

The next day, the squadron, while on patrol, gets attacked by a small group led by Issa. They chase them, falling into Issa's trap and ending up assaulted by a much larger group of young people, leaving them trapped from all sides in a stairwell and fighting for their lives. Chris is wounded when a bottle breaks on his face, and the backup car Stéphane radios for gets immediately destroyed by the young people, forcing the backup policemen to flee. They also attack the Mayor's office and end up clubbing him and throwing him down a set of stairs. Stéphane pounds on the nearest door, begging for help, which happens to be the door to Buzz's apartment; however, Buzz further locks the door. Issa lights a Molotov cocktail and prepares to finish the squadron off with it, leading Stéphane to point his gun at him and warn him not to. The screen fades to black as both Issa and Stéphane try to decide what to do next, and a quote from Victor Hugo's Les Misérables appears: "Remember this, my friends: there are no such things as bad plants or bad humans. There are only bad cultivators."

== Cast ==
- Damien Bonnard as Brigadier Stéphane Ruiz
- Alexis Manenti as Chris
- Djebril Zonga as Gwada
- Issa Perica as Issa
- Al-Hassan Ly as Buzz
- Steve Tientcheu as The Mayor
- Almamy Kanoute as Salah
- Nazar Ben Fatma as La Pince
- Raymond Lopez as Zorro
- Jeanne Balibar as The Commissioner

== Production ==
In October 2018, it was announced Damien Bonnard, Alexis Manenti and Djebril Zonga had joined the cast of the film, with Ladj Ly directing from a screenplay he wrote alongside Giordano Gederlini and Alexis Manenti.

== Release ==
The film had its world premiere at the Cannes Film Festival on 15 May 2019. Shortly after, Amazon Studios acquired U.S. distribution rights to the film. It also screened at the Toronto International Film Festival on 10 September 2019. It was released in France on 20 November 2019 by Le Pacte. It was released in the United States on 10 January 2020.

== Reception ==
=== Box office ===
By 31 December 2019, 1,7 million tickets had been sold for Les Misérables in France. It grossed $330,181 in the United States and Canada and $18,8 million in other territories for a worldwide total of $19.2 million, against a production budget of about $2.5 million.

=== Critical response ===
As of October 2021, 88% of the 191 reviews compiled on review aggregator Rotten Tomatoes are positive, with an average rating of 7.6/10. The website's critical consensus reads, "Les Misérables transcends its unwieldy story with compelling ideas and an infectious energy that boils over during a thrilling final act." On Metacritic, the film has a weighted average score of 78 out of 100, based on 35 critics, indicating "generally favorable reviews".

=== Political reactions ===
Le Journal du dimanche revealed that Emmanuel Macron was "upset by the accuracy" of Les Misérables, so much so that he "asked the government to hurry to find ideas and act to improve living conditions in the banlieues". Jacques Dion, in Marianne, said that "[Macron] must never have heard of the Borloo plan for the banlieues that he himself had abandoned."

People such as Jean-Louis Borloo support the film, and Valérie Pécresse wrote in a tweet: "Proud that the region supported #LesMiserables a real film about the banlieue, which alerts us to the absolute necessity of a plan for the banlieues which does away with ghetto neighbourhoods, with a real ten year strategy!"

=== Awards and nominations ===
Award	Date of ceremony	Category	Recipient(s)	Result	Ref
Academy Awards	9 February 2020	Best International Feature Film	France	Nominated	
Black Reel Awards	6 February 2020	Outstanding Screenplay	Alexis Manenti, Giordano Gederlini and Ladj Ly	Nominated	
Black Reel Awards	6 February 2020	Outstanding International Film	France	Nominated	
British Academy Film Awards	10 April 2021	Best Film Not in the English Language	Ladj Ly, Toufik Ayadi and Christophe Barral	Nominated	
Cahiers du Cinéma	6 January 2020	Best Film	Ladj Ly	Nominated	
Cannes Film Festival	May 2019	Palme d'Or	Ladj Ly	Nominated	
Cannes Film Festival	May 2019	Golden Camera	Ladj Ly	Nominated	
Cannes Film Festival	May 2019	Jury Prize	Ladj Ly	Won	
César Awards	28 February 2020	Best Film	Toufik Ayadi, Christophe Barral, and Ladj Ly	Won	
César Awards	28 February 2020	Best Director	Ladj Ly	Nominated	
César Awards	28 February 2020	Best Actor	Damien Bonnard	Nominated	
César Awards	28 February 2020	Best Original Screenplay	Alexis Manenti, Giordano Gederlini and Ladj Ly	Nominated	
César Awards	28 February 2020	Best First Film	Toufik Ayadi, Christophe Barral, Ladj Ly	Nominated	
César Awards	28 February 2020	Best Cinematography	Julien Poupard	Nominated	
César Awards	28 February 2020	Best Editing	Flora Volpelière	Won	
César Awards	28 February 2020	Best Music	Marco Casanova and Kim Chapiron	Nominated	
César Awards	28 February 2020	Most Promising Actor	Alexis Manenti	Won	
César Awards	28 February 2020	Most Promising Actor	Djebril Zonga	Nominated	
César Awards	28 February 2020	Best Sound	Arnaud Lavaleix, Jérôme Gonthier, Marco Casanova	Nominated	
César Awards	28 February 2020	César du Public	Ladj Ly	Won	
Critics' Choice Movie Awards	7 March 2021	Best Foreign Language Film	Ladj Ly	Nominated	
Dallas-Fort Worth Film Critics Association Awards	16 December 2019	Best Foreign Language Film	France	Nominated	
Deauville Film Festival	14 September 2019	Michel d'Ornano Award	Ladj Ly	Won	
Durban International Film Festival	6 August 2019	Best Film	Ladj Ly	Won	
Durban International Film Festival	6 August 2019	Best Screenplay	Ladj Ly	Won	
El Gouna Film Festival	September 2019	Audience Award	Ladj Ly	Won	
European Film Awards	7 December 2019	European Film	Toufik Ayadi, Christophe Barral, Ladj Ly	Nominated	
European Film Awards	7 December 2019	European Screenwriter	Alexis Manenti, Giordano Gederlini and Ladj Ly	Nominated	
European Film Awards	7 December 2019	European Discovery	Toufik Ayadi, Christophe Barral, Ladj Ly	Won	
Globes de Cristal Awards	2020	Best Film	Les Miserables	Nominated	
Golden Globes	5 January 2020	Best Foreign Language Film	France	Nominated	
Goya Awards	25 January 2020	Best European Film	Les Miserables - Ladj Ly	Nominated	
Grand Prix de l'UCC	4 January 2020	Grand Prix de l'UCC	Les Miserables - Ladj Ly	Nominated	
Houston Film Critics Society Awards	2 January 2020	Best Foreign Language Film	France	Nominated	
Independent Film Spirit Awards	8 February 2020	Best International Film	France	Nominated	
Indiewire Critics' Poll	16 December 2019	Best First Feature	Les Miserables - Ladj Ly	Nominated	
Jerusalem Film Festival	July 2019	Best International Film	Ladj Ly	Won	
London Film Critics' Circle Awards	7 February 2021	Foreign Language Film of the Year	Ladj Ly	Nominated	
Lumière Awards	27 January 2020	Best Film	Les Miserables - Ladj Ly	Won	
Lumière Awards	27 January 2020	Best Director	Ladj Ly	Nominated	
Lumière Awards	27 January 2020	Best Screenplay	Alexis Manenti, Giordano Gederlini and Ladj Ly	Won	
Lumière Awards	27 January 2020	Best Cinematography	Julien Poupard	Nominated	
Lumière Awards	27 January 2020	Best First Film	Ladj Ly	Nominated	
Lumière Awards	27 January 2020	Best Male Revelation	Alexis Manenti	Won	
Lumière Awards	27 January 2020	Best Male Revelation	Issa Perica	Nominated	
Palm Springs International Film Festival	2 January 2020	Directors to Watch	Ladj Ly	Won	
Palm Springs International Film Festival	2 January 2020	Best Foreign Language Film	Ladj Ly	Nominated	
Philadelphia Film Festival	October 2019	Best First Featurey	Ladj Ly	Nominated	
Rotterdam International Film Festival	September 2019	IFFR Youth Jury Award	Ladj Ly	Won	
San Sebastián International Film Festival	2020	City of Donostia Audience Award	Ladj Ly	Nominated	
San Francisco Film Critics Circle	16 December 2019	Best Foreign-Language Film	France	Nominated	
Satellite Awards	1 March 2020	Best Motion Picture, International Film	France	Nominated	
Stockholm Film Festival	November 2019	Best Film	Les Miserables - Ladj Ly	Nominated	

== See also ==
- La Haine, a film with a similar theme and setting
- List of submissions to the 92nd Academy Awards for Best International Feature Film
- List of French submissions for the Academy Award for Best International Feature Film
- List of hood films
