= Antoine Reinartz =

French actor (born 1985)

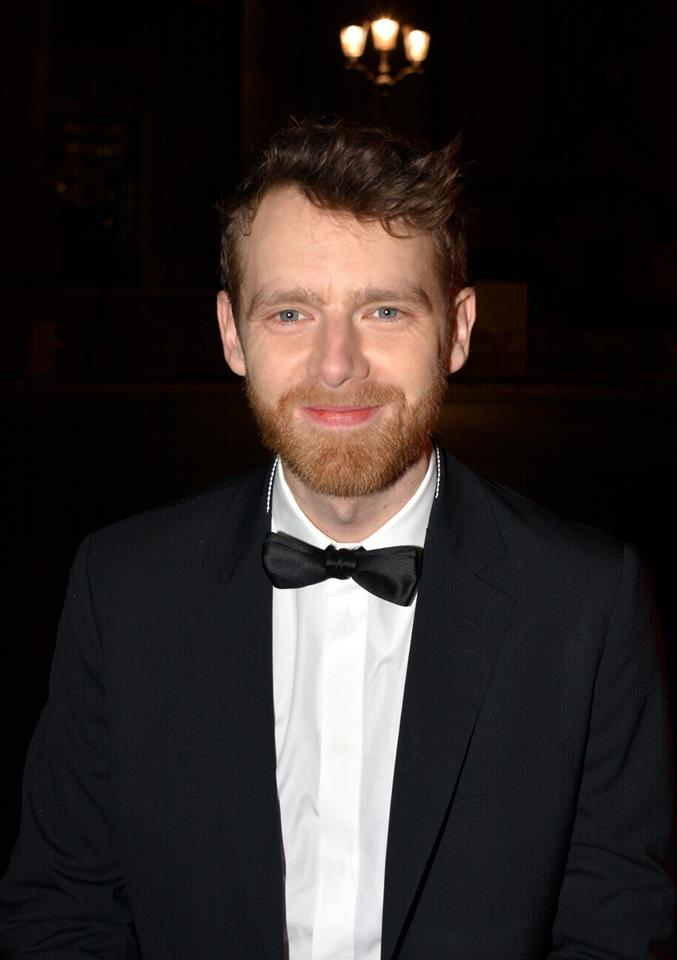
- Reinartz at the 43rd César Awards in 2018
- Born: 1985 (age 40–41); Essey-lès-Nancy, Meurthe-et-Moselle, France
- Occupation: Actor
- Years active: 2012–present

Antoine Reinartz (French: [ʁɛnaʁts]; born 1985) is a French actor. He is most known for his performance in BPM (Beats per Minute) (2017), for which he won the César Award for Best Supporting Actor.

== Career ==
Reinartz was nominated twice at the César Award for Best Supporting Actor. He won the first time, in 2018, for BPM (Beats per Minute) and received a second nomination for his role in the Anatomy of a Fall, in 2024.

== Theater ==
Year	Title	Author	Director
2016	Les Trois Mousquetaires, la série	Alexandre Dumas	Clara Hédouin & Jade Herbulot
2018	The Events	David Greig	Ramin Gray
2022	The Glass Menagerie	Tennessee Williams	Ivo van Hove

== Filmography ==
=== Cinema ===
Year	Title	Role	Director	Notes
2017	BPM (Beats per Minute)	Thibault	Robin Campillo	
2019	Oh Mercy!	Louis Cotterel	Arnaud Desplechin	
2019	Non-Fiction	Blaise	Olivier Assayas	
2019	School Life	Thierry Bouchard	Mehdi Idir & Grand Corps Malade	
2019	Perfect Nanny	Paul	Lucie Borleteau	
2019	Alice and the Mayor	Daniel	Nicolas Pariser	
2020	Les mauvais garçons	Narrator	Élie Girard	Short
2022	Softie	Jean Adamski	Samuel Theis	
2022	Arthur Rambo	Nicolas	Laurent Cantet	
2022	The Damned Don’t Cry	Sébastien	Fyzal Boulifa	
2023	Anatomy of a Fall	The prosecutor	Justine Triet	
2025	Love Me Tender	Laurent	Anna Cazenave Cambet	

=== Television ===
Year	Title	Role	Director	Notes
2021	Nona et ses filles	Antoine Marchand	Valérie Donzelli	TV mini-series (9 episodes)
2022	Irma Vep	Jeremie	Olivier Assayas	TV mini-series
2023	Class Act	Fabien Bogaert	Tristan Séguéla	TV mini-series
2024	La Maison	Robinson Ledu	Fabrice Gobert & Daniel Grou	TV mini-series (10 episodes)
2025	Des Vivants	Grégory	Jean-Xavier De Lestrade	TV mini-series (8 episodes)

== Awards and nominations ==
Year	Award	Nominated work	Result
2018	César Award for Best Supporting Actor	BPM (Beats per Minute)	Won
2018	Boston Society of Film Critics Award for Best Cast	BPM (Beats per Minute)	Nominated
2024	César Award for Best Supporting Actor	Anatomy of a Fall	Nominated
