= Perdrix (film) =

2019 film

- Film poster
- Directed by: Erwan Le Duc
- Written by: Erwan Le Duc
- Cinematography: Alexis Kavyrchine
- Edited by: Julie Dupré
- Music by: Julie Roué
- Production company: Domino Films
- Distributed by: Pyramide Distribution
- Release date: 19 May 2019 (Cannes)
- Running time: 102 minutes
- Country: France
- Language: French

Perdrix (transl. Partridge, also known as The Bare Necessity) is a 2019 French drama film directed by Erwan Le Duc. It was screened in the Directors' Fortnight section at the 2019 Cannes Film Festival.

== Cast ==
- Alexandre Steiger
- Fanny Ardant
- Maud Wyler
- Nicolas Maury
- Patience Munchenbach
- Swann Arlaud

== Production ==
Perdrix was shot entirely in the Vosges department, between 24 September to 31 October 2018. The main scenes were shot in Plombières-les-Bains. The fake gendarmerie building was set up in Golbey. The mountain and forest scenes were shot at the Haut du Roc, which is located between Saulxures-sur-Moselotte and Basse-sur-le-Rupt, and the Champ de Roches, located just south of Corcieux in Barbey-Seroux. The final scene was filmed at the Lac des Corbeaux in La Bresse.
