= La Belle Époque (film) =

2019 film by Nicolas Bedos

- Theatrical release poster
- Directed by: Nicolas Bedos
- Written by: Nicolas Bedos
- Produced by: François Kraus; Denis Pineau-Valencienne
- Starring: Daniel Auteuil; Guillaume Canet; Doria Tillier; Fanny Ardant
- Cinematography: Nicolas Bolduc
- Edited by: Anny Danché
- Music by: Nicolas Bedos; Anne-Sophie Versnaeyen
- Production companies: Les Films du Kiosque; Pathé Films; Orange Studio; France 2 Cinéma; Hugar Prod; Fils; Umedia
- Distributed by: Pathé Distribution
- Release dates: 20 May 2019 (Cannes); 6 November 2019 (France)
- Running time: 115 minutes
- Country: France
- Language: French
- Budget: $10.6 million
- Box office: $14.4 million

La Belle Époque is a 2019 French romantic comedy-drama film written and directed by Nicolas Bedos.

The film stars Daniel Auteuil as Victor, a man in his 60s whose long marriage to Marianne (Fanny Ardant) is on the rocks. When Victor meets Antoine (Guillaume Canet), the owner of a company which allows people to perform a version of "time travel" by visiting a stage where the company acts out a staged historical reenactment, he takes the opportunity to revisit the moment when he first met Marianne, in hopes of rekindling his love for her.

The film premiered out of competition at the 2019 Cannes Film Festival.

== Plot ==
A former draftsman, Victor is now disillusioned. His marriage to Marianne is floundering and he is uninterested and overwhelmed by this overly technological modern world. To cheer him up, his son Maxime pays him for an evening organized by his friend Antoine's company Les Voyageurs du temps. This company offers its customers the opportunity to relive the era of their choice, by mixing theatrical artifices and historical reconstruction. Some wealthy clients choose to spend an evening with William Faulkner, Adolf Hitler or with 17th century aristocrats. At first reluctant, Victor accepts after Marianne throws him out. He opts to dive back into the most significant week of his life, the one where he met his great love, on May 16, 1974, in the La Belle Époque café in Lyon. In this "staging", Marianne is played by Margot, an actress who lives a complicated and tumultuous relationship with Antoine. The latter, a former screenwriter, is very picky and does not support any approximation on the part of his collaborators. Gradually, Victor will lend himself to the game, until he loses himself in these “reconstituted” memories.

== Cast ==
- Daniel Auteuil as Victor Drumond
- Guillaume Canet as Antoine
- Doria Tillier as Margot
- Fanny Ardant as Marianne Drumond
- Pierre Arditi as Pierre
- Denis Podalydès as François
- Michaël Cohen as Maxime Drumond
- Jeanne Arènes as Amélie
- Bertrand Poncet as Adrien
- Bruno Raffaelli as Maurice/Yvon/Hemingway
- Lizzie Brocheré as Gisèle / Margot’s friend
- Thomas Scimeca as Freddy/Hans Axel von Fersen
- Urbain Cancelier as Villemain

== Reception ==
On Rotten Tomatoes, the film has an approval rating of 90% based on reviews from 31 critics, with an average rating of 7.6/10. On Metacritic, the film has a weighted average score of 75 out of 100, based on 4 critics, indicating "generally favourable reviews".

Peter Debruge of Variety wrote: "Where so many high-concept romantic comedies squander their one big idea, 'La Belle Époque' leverages its own to remind us how and why we fall in love in the first place..." and Debruge praises the writing, saying it has "a script that's as ambitiously imagined as a Charlie Kaufman movie." Todd McCarthy of The Hollywood Reporter gave the film a positive review calling it a "witty, sexy and original romantic comedy that touches many points of satisfaction."
