= Alice and the Mayor =

2019 film

- Film poster
- French: Alice et le Maire
- Directed by: Nicolas Pariser
- Written by: Nicolas Pariser
- Starring: Anaïs Demoustier; Antoine Reinartz; Fabrice Luchini; Léonie Simaga; Nora Hamzawi
- Cinematography: Sébastien Buchmann
- Edited by: Christel Dewynter
- Music by: Benjamin Esdraffo
- Production company: Bizibi
- Distributed by: BAC Films
- Release dates: 18 May 2019 (Cannes); 2 October 2019 (France)
- Running time: 103 minutes
- Country: France
- Language: French
- Budget: $5.3 million
- Box office: $6.2 million

Alice and the Mayor (French: Alice et le Maire) is a 2019 French drama film directed by Nicolas Pariser. It was screened in the Directors' Fortnight section at the 2019 Cannes Film Festival, where it won the Europa Cinemas Label Award for Best European Film.

== Plot ==
Alice, a reserved single woman, gives up teaching in England to work in the city hall of Lyon, France's third city. Her job is to feed ideas to the mayor, Paul Théraneau, a divorced man who does not have enough time to read and think. He appreciates her help and soon promotes her, which provokes jealousy in the rest of the office. She is put on a team to plan the city of the future, but soon sees that it is a vanity project going nowhere. Discussions with Théraneau, a lifelong socialist who increasingly values her input, bring home to her to that intellectuals may discuss but politicians must deliver.

She looks up a former lover, Gauthier, but he is preoccupied with his eccentric wife. At a meeting, Alice is impressed by an entrepreneur who has revived a hand-printing business, the last in Lyon, and goes back to his apartment one evening but, after making love, he violently criticises her way of life. Deeply shaken, she goes to bed in her apartment alone and rings Gauthier, who comes round and tries to reassure her, revealing that his wife is in and out of psychiatric care. While Gauthier is there, Alice's phone rings. It is the mayor in his car outside, who has had a tense dinner with his ex-wife and wants somebody to comfort him. Alice manages to offer sympathy without inviting him upstairs.

Théraneau decides to campaign for the socialist nomination in the upcoming elections for the presidency of the republic and makes Alice his speechwriter. At the socialist congress, he has doubts over his chances and does not leave his hotel to deliver his stirring address. Three years later, Alice revisits Lyon from her job in England and meets up with Théraneau, who has retired from public duties. The two still enjoy each other's company but their lives, once close, are now far apart. He has plenty of time to read and think, while she has a baby to rear.

== Cast ==
- Fabrice Luchini as Paul Théraneau
- Anaïs Demoustier as Alice Heimann
- Nora Hamzawi as Mélinda
- Léonie Simaga as Isabelle Leinsdorf
- Antoine Reinartz as Daniel
- Maud Wyler as Delphine Bénard
- Alexandre Steiger as Gauthier
- Pascal Rénéric as Xavier
