= By the Grace of God (film) =

- Film poster
- Directed by: François Ozon
- Written by: François Ozon
- Produced by: Éric Altmayer; Nicolas Altmayer
- Starring: Melvil Poupaud; Denis Ménochet; Swann Arlaud
- Cinematography: Manuel Dacosse
- Edited by: Laure Gardette
- Music by: Evgueni Galperine; Sacha Galperine
- Production companies: Mandarin Films; Scope Pictures
- Distributed by: Mars Distribution
- Release dates: February 2019 (Berlin); 20 February 2019 (France); 27 February 2019 (Belgium)
- Running time: 137 minutes
- Countries: France; Belgium
- Language: French
- Budget: $6.5 million
- Box office: $7.8 million

By the Grace of God (French: Grâce à Dieu) is a 2019 French-Belgian drama film directed by François Ozon. The film stars Melvil Poupaud, Denis Ménochet and Swann Arlaud as three victims of a Catholic priest's abuse, who are set to expose the sexual abuse hidden by the Catholic Church.

It premiered at the 69th Berlin International Film Festival and won the Jury Grand Prix. The film was released in France on 20 February 2019 and in Belgium a week later, and has received critical acclaim.

== Plot ==
Alexandre Guérin lives in the Lyon region. A flourishing banking executive, husband of a loving wife and father of five children, he is a practicing Catholic, just like his family. One day, after a conversation with a former scout comrade like him, he remembers the sexual abuse he suffered from a pedophile priest, Father Bernard Preynat. The facts are prescribed. But, assailed by painful memories, Guérin decides to undertake an investigation. He gets in touch with the archbishop's psychologist, Régine Maire. Through her, he obtains an appointment with Cardinal Philippe Barbarin, Archbishop of Lyon. He then discovers that despite the warning of several parents, the Church has covered up the affair. Régine Maire organizes a brief confrontation between Alexandre and Father Preynat, which ends with an almost surreal common prayer. Despite the numerous emails from Guérin, the ecclesiastical authorities procrastinate and backtrack. Worse, during a mass, Guérin finds that Father Preynat, kept in office, is still in contact with young people.

Guérin fails to find other victims who would agree to testify. He therefore decides to file a complaint alone. Captain Courteau, who received his statement, is looking for victims for whom the facts would not be prescribed. This is how he met François, now an atheist. The latter decides to testify in front of the media and creates, for this purpose, the association La Parole Libérée. Other victims join him, including the surgeon Gilles and Emmanuel, a tormented being who has serious consequences. Guérin joins them. Together, they start a legal action.

Under increasing pressure and urged to act by Régine Maire, Cardinal Philippe Barbarin organizes a press conference. But he blurts out that the facts are “thank God prescribed”. This unfortunate word shocks the audience. The association obtains the indictment of Father Preynat, who recognizes the facts. The plaintiffs hope that their action will challenge the Catholic hierarchy. But all will have been confronted with their family and with themselves. Guérin wonders about his Christian faith.

== Cast ==
- Melvil Poupaud as Alexandre Guérin
- Denis Ménochet as François Debord
- Swann Arlaud as Emmanuel Thomassin
- Éric Caravaca as Gilles Perret
- François Marthouret as Cardinal Barbarin
- Bernard Verley as Bernard Preynat
- Josiane Balasko as Irène Thomassin
- Martine Erhel as Régine Maire
- Hélène Vincent as Odile Debord
- Frédéric Pierrot as Captain Courteau
- Aurélia Petit as Marie Guérin

== Production ==
Principal photography on the film began on February 12, 2018, and lasted till April 13, 2018, in Paris and Belgium.

== Reception ==
By the Grace of God received largely positive reviews from critics. On Rotten Tomatoes, it has a 96% approval rating based on 96 reviews, with an average rating of 7.6/10. The website's critics consensus reads: "Patient in its approach yet stirring in its conviction, By the Grace of God draws soberly gripping cinema from real-life horror." It has a 75 out of 100 score on Metacritic based on 20 critics, indicating "generally favorable reviews".

Peter Bradshaw of The Guardian wrote "Ozon has made a decent and valuable film, though it often seems like the drama part of a docudrama: some of the scenes feel like respectful re-enactments that could have gone into a documentary".

Film critic Tim Robey of The Daily Telegraph gave the film 5 stars out of 5, writing "If there were ever any doubt that Ozon, that impish provocateur, was the man to handle it, the career-topping urgency of his filmmaking sweeps it away inch by inch, sequence by methodical sequence". The film received similar praise from Linda Marric of The Jewish Chronicle, who also gave it full 5 stars and called it "A robustly acted, compassionate and honest film with moments of disarming tenderness throughout".

The Jesuit publication, America praised the director, calling his approach to the film as "masterful", while Justin Chang of the Los Angeles Times called the film as "patient, lucid, [and] generously human".

San Francisco Chronicle's Mick LaSalle was a different view. He wrote "By the Grace of God begins to spin its wheels, with unnecessary scenes that give color to the events, when we're more interested in the grand movements".

== Lawsuit ==
The priest portrayed in the film, Bernard Preynat, attempted without success to block its release in France. On 4 July 2019, an ecclesiastical tribunal of the Archdiocese of Lyon announced it had determined that Preynat was "guilty of criminal acts of a sexual character on minors younger than 16" and applied its maximum penalty by defrocking him. In March 2020, Preynat was convicted in the French courts of sexual assault and given a five-year prison sentence.
