= Ladj Ly =

French filmmaker (born 1980)

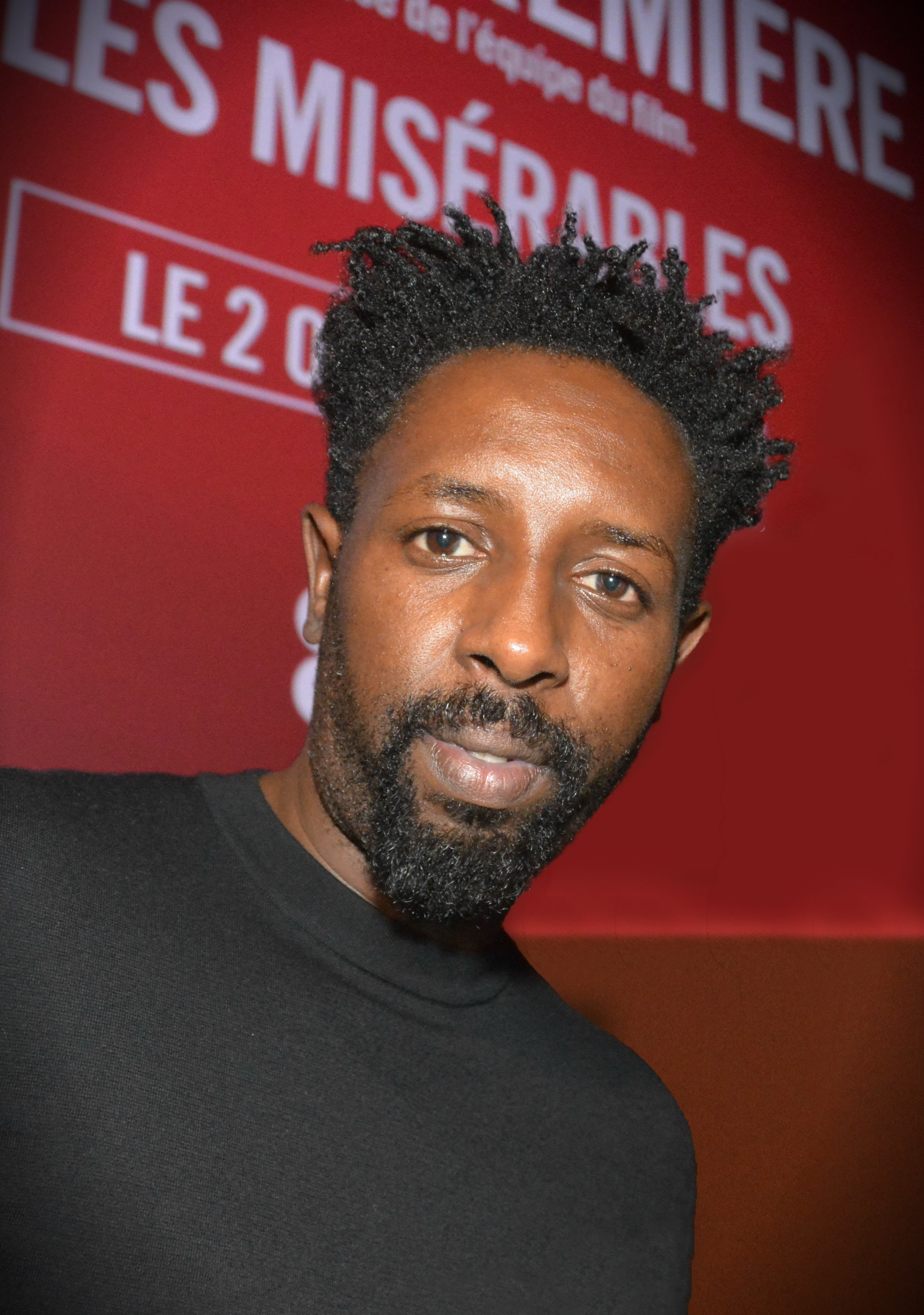
- Ly in 2019
- Born: 19 March 1980 (age 46)
- Occupation: Film director Screenwriter
- Notable work: Les Misérables

Ladj Ly (French pronunciation: [ladʒ li]; born 19 March 1980 in Paris) is a French film director and screenwriter. Most known for his 2019's Les Misérables, which won the Jury Prize at the Cannes Film Festival and was nominated for the Academy Award for Best Foreign Film.

== Biography ==
Ly's parents are from Mali and he grew up in Montfermeil, a district of Bosquets. He started making films with his friends Kim Chapiron, Romain Gavras, and JR, in the collective Kourtrajmé.

He directed his first films, notably for Oxmo Puccino, and his first documentaries, 365 jours à Clichy-Montfermeil (365 days in Clichy-Montfermeil), filmed after the 2005 French riots; Go Fast Connexion; and 365 jours au Mali (365 days in Mali).

In 2011, Ly was given a three-year prison sentence for kidnapping and false imprisonment. In 2012, the sentence was reduced on appeal to two years imprisonment, and one year suspended sentence.

Les Misérables (2017) is the first non-documentary film he directed. The short film received many awards, notably at the Clermont-Ferrand International Short Film Festival and a nomination for the César Award for Best Short Film in 2018. In the same year, he was nominated for the César Award for Best Documentary Film for À voix haute : La Force de la parole with Stéphane de Freitas.

In 2018 in Montfermeil, Ly created a free film school, called "L'école Kourtrajmé".

His 2019's Les Misérables is an expansion of his short film of same name, the film had its world premiere at the main competition of the 2019 Cannes Film Festival, where it won the Jury Prize. Alongside Alexis Manenti and Giordano Gederlini, he won the Lumière Award for Best Screenplay, and was nominated for the César Award for Best Original Screenplay and the European Film Award for Best Screenwriter. The film also won the César Award for Best Film.

His second feature film, Les Indésirables, premiered at the 2023 Toronto International Film Festival on September 8, 2023.

in 2025, he will direct a biopic about Thomas Alexandre Dumas titled Dumas - Black Devil.

== Filmography ==
=== Feature films ===
Year	English Title	Original Title	Notes
2019	Les Misérables		
2023	Les Indésirables	Bâtiment 5	
2026	Dumas: Black Devil	Dumas - Diable Noir	Post-production
