= List of French films of 2023 =

This is a list of French films that were scheduled to be released in 2023, including co-productions with other countries.

== Box office and budgets ==
=== Domestic ===
The highest-grossing French films released in 2023, by domestic box office, are as follows:

*	Denotes films still running in French cinemas

Highest-grossing films of 2023 (France)
Rank	Overall rank	Title	Distributor	Domestic attendance	Domestic gross (Note: Estimated)	Weeks in release
1	3	Astérix & Obélix: The Middle Kingdom	Pathé	4,622,711	€33,468,000	30
2	5	Alibi.com 2	StudioCanal	4,277,971	€31,352,000	28
3	8	The Three Musketeers: D'Artagnan	Pathé	3,432,815	€24,932,000	43
4	13	The Three Musketeers: Milady	Pathé	2,576,209	€18,652,000	21
5	19	Open Season	UGC	1,924,712	€13,858,000	36
6	20	Anatomy of a Fall*	Le Pacte	1,907,902	€13,813,000	58
7	21	Only 3 Days Left	StudioCanal	1,898,935	€13,748,000	20
8	26	Ladybug & Cat Noir: Awakening	SND	1,646,431	€11,920,000	26
9	32	Les SEGPA au Ski	Apollo Films	1,369,549	€9,916,000	19
10	34	The Braid*	SND	1,256,704	€9,099,000	44
11	35	Father & Soldier	Gaumont	1,196,248	€8,661,000	25
12	39	All Your Faces	StudioCanal	1,165,390	€8,702,000	62
13	40	The Animal Kingdom	StudioCanal	1,160,322	€8,401,000	47
14	43	The Crime Is Mine	Gaumont	1,091,489	€7,902,000	40
15	45	On the Wandering Paths	Apollo Films	1,056,777	€7,651,000	35
16	46	Second Round	Pathé	979,636	€7,093,000	20
17	47	Sweet Little Things	Zinc Film	946,194	€6,851,000	40
18	50	A Difficult Year	Gaumont	901,332	€6,526,000	30
19	51	Argonuts	Apollo Films	874,125	€6,329,000	38
20	55	The Jungle Bunch: World Tour	SND	830,657	€6,014,000	20

=== Worldwide ===
The highest-grossing French films released in 2023, by worldwide box office, are as follows:

*	Denotes films still running in cinemas

Highest-grossing films of 2023 (Worldwide)
Rank	Title	French Distributor	Worldwide gross (Note: Estimated)
1	Astérix & Obélix: The Middle Kingdom	Pathé	€51,342,000
2	Anatomy of a Fall*	Le Pacte	€49,501,000
3	Ladybug & Cat Noir: Awakening	SND	€45,820,000
4	Alibi.com 2	StudioCanal	€33,280,000
5	The Three Musketeers: D'Artagnan	Pathé	€33,276,000
6	The Three Musketeers: Milady	Pathé	€22,650,000
7	Argonuts*	Apollo Films	€18,404,000
8	Retribution	StudioCanal	€17,413,000
9	Jeanne du Barry*	Le Pacte	€15,764,000
10	Only 3 Days Left	StudioCanal	€15,433,000
11	The Jungle Bunch: World Tour	SND	€14,554,000
12	Open Season	UGC	€14,195,000
13	The Taste of Things*	Gaumont	€13,710,000
14	The Crime Is Mine	Gaumont	€11,907,000
15	The Braid*	SND	€11,208,000
16	Les SEGPA au Ski	Apollo Films	€9,916,000
17	On the Wandering Paths	Apollo Films	€9,557,000
18	The Animal Kingdom	StudioCanal	€9,403,000
19	All Your Faces	StudioCanal	€9,276,000
20	Father & Soldier	Gaumont	€9,055,000

=== Most Expensive Films ===
The most expensive French films of 2023 are as follows:

Most expensive French films of 2023
Rank	Title	Distributor	Budget
1	Ladybug & Cat Noir: Awakening	SND	€80,000,000
2	The Three Musketeers: D'Artagnan	Pathé	€72,000,000 (Note: Combined budget)
2	The Three Musketeers: Milady	Pathé	€72,000,000
3	Astérix & Obélix: The Middle Kingdom	Pathé	€65,000,000
4	Life for Real	Pathé	€23,000,000
5	Marlowe	Metropolitan Filmexport	€22,300,000
6	Jeanne du Barry	Le Pacte	€20,620,000
7	Dogman	Apollo Films	€20,417,000
8	Only 3 Days Left	StudioCanal	€19,200,000
9	Retribution	StudioCanal	€18,940,000
10	The Animal Kingdom*	StudioCanal	€15,960,000
11	Mr. Putifar's Wacky Plan	UGC	€15,800,000
12	Abbé Pierre – A Century of Devotion	SND	€15,700,000
13	Alibi.com 2	StudioCanal	€14,200,000
14	Flo	Metropolitan Filmexport	€14,000,000
15	The Crime Is Mine	Gaumont	€13,780,000
16	Father & Soldier	Gaumont	€12,100,000
17	Acid	Pathé	€12,000,000
18	Carmen	Pathé	€11,500,000
19	Princes of the Desert	SND	€11,000,000
20	How to Survive Without Mum	StudioCanal	€10,700,000
21	A Happy Man	Gaumont	€9,850,000
22	Jeff & Jean-Marc's Adventures	SND	€9,800,000

=== Theatrical Profitability ===
*	Denotes films still running in cinemas

Most profitable French films of 2023
Rank	Title	Distributor	Budget	Worldwide gross (Note: Estimated)	Theatrical Profitability
1	Anatomy of a Fall	Le Pacte	€6,200,000	€49,501,000	798.4%
2	Alibi.com 2	StudioCanal	€14,200,000	€32,202,000	234.4%
3	Four Daughters	Jour2Fête	€900,000	€1,850,000	205.5%
4	Argonuts*	Apollo Films	€9,150,000	€18,404,000	201.1%
5	The Taste of Things*	Gaumont	€6,860,000	€13,710,000	199.9%
6	The Jungle Bunch: World Tour*	SND	€8,100,000	€14,554,000	179.7%
7	Sweet Little Things*	Zinc Film	€5,460,000	€8,284,000	151.7%
8	The Braid*	SND	€8,500,000	€11,208,000	131.9%
9	Return to Seoul	Les Films du Losange	€2,200,000	€2,545,000	115.7%
10	Bernadette*	Warner Bros. Pictures	€6,500,000	€7,078,000	108.9%
11	A Great Friend	SND	€5,950,000	€6,297,000	105.8%
12	A Cat's Life	UGC	€4,000,000	€3,816,000	95.4%
13	Just the Two of Us*	Diaphana Distribution	€5,830,000	€5,267,000	90.3%
14	Only 3 Days Left*	StudioCanal	€19,200,000	€15,433,000	80.4%
15	Astérix & Obélix: The Middle Kingdom	Pathé	€65,000,000	€51,342,000	79%
16	Jeanne du Barry	Le Pacte	€20,620,000	€15,764,000	76.5%
17	Father & Soldier	Gaumont	€12,100,000	€9,055,000	74.8%
18	Two Tickets to Greece	Memento Distribution	€5,680,000	€3,743,000	65.9%
19	Marguerite's Theorem*	Pyramide Films	€2,870,000	€1,861,000	64.8%
20	Vaincre ou mourir	Saje distribution	€3,500,000	€2,251,000	64.3%
21	Tchaikovsky's Wife	BAC Films	€2,113,000	€1,344,000	63.6%
22	The Book of Wonders	SND	€7,800,000	€4,732,000	60.7%
23	Infested	Tandem Films	€5,000,000	€3,022,000	60.4%
24	Whale Nation	Pan-Européenne	€2,500,000	€1,474,000	59%
25	Le Clan	Pan-Européenne	€2,700,000	€1,556,000	57.6%

Least profitable French films of 2023
Rank	Title	Distributor	Budget	Worldwide gross (Note: Estimated)	Theatrical Profitability
1	Heartbeast	Wayna Pitch	€2,200,000	€8,000	0.3%
2	Earwig	New Story Films	€3,400,000	€27,000	0.8%
3	Swing Rendez-vous	Epicentre Films	€1,000,000	€14,000	1.4%
4	The Line	Diaphana Distribution	€5,200,000	€102,000	2%
5	Amore Mio	Urban Distribution	€1,200,000	€27,000	2.3%
6	Mother and Son	Diaphana Distribution	€3,900,000	€108,000	2.8%
7	Rascals	The Jokers Films	€3,510,000	€130,000	3.7%
8	Remains of the Wind	Alfama Films	€2,036,000	€80,000	3.9%
9	Tel Aviv Beirut	Dulac Distribution	€2,300,000	€92,000	4%
10	Beating Sun	Pyramide Films	€1,300,000	€67,000	5.2%
11	Woman at Sea	Rezo Films	€3,040,000	€158,000	5.2%
12	This One Summer	StudioCanal	€7,940,000	€416,000	5.2%
13	Slumlord	The Jokers Films	€1,950,000	€115,000	5.9%
14	For My Country'	Memento Distribution	€5,300,000	€317,000	6%
15	The Great Magic	Ad Vitam Distribution	€6,700,000	€468,000	7%
16	Sixteen	Paname Distribution	€5,300,000	€376,000	7.1%
17	Where Life Begins	JHR Films	€3,0100,000	€222,000	7.4%
18	Bright Women	Alba Films	€1,100,000	€82,000	7.5%
19	Neneh Superstar	Gaumont	€5,400,000	€403,000	7.5%
20	The Astronaut	Diaphana Distribution	€3,950,000	€313,000	7.9%

== Release date changes ==
In late January 2023, A Love Story was pushed back from March 29 to April 12. Shortly thereafter in early February 2023, Apaches: Gang of Paris was pushed back from February 22 to March 29, Loving Memories from March 22 to April 5, Alma Viva from March 29 to April 12 and The Lost Boys a week from May 3 to the 10th, while Serial Driver was brought forward from April 26 to March 29. Initially set to release on April 5, 2023, Juniors was pushed back first to the fall, then back forward to 26 July. Streams was pushed back a couple of weeks from April 12 to April 26. In late February, Dogman was pushed back from April 19 to September 27 following enthusiastic reception from international distributors at the European Film Market, in order to premiere at a film festival before a worldwide release. In early March, Summer Frost was pushed back from 22 March to an indeterminate Summer 2023 date, set in late April to 26 July. Visions was moved forward three weeks from the 27th to the 6th of September, while La Petite was pushed back one week from 13 September to the 20th. In late March, Summer Scars was pushed back one week from 26 April to 3 May. In early April, Stars at Noon was moved back six weeks from 3 May to 14 June and The Hummingbird almost three months from 10 May to 2 August. Also set to release on 10 May, Parisian Hustle was pushed back indefinitely. Later in April, Tropic was retitled and pushed back over a month from 14 June to 19 July, before being pushed further to 2 August. In mid-May, Le Pacte moved The Peace and Love Process back one week from 7 June to 14 June. On the first of June, Last Summer was moved forward one week from 20 to 13 September. A few days later, Small, Slow but Steady was brought forward two and a half months from 15 November to 30 August. In mid-June, The Damned Don't Cry was pushed back two weeks from 12 to 26 July while Paint It Gold was brought forward one week from 16 to 9 August.

In late July, Little Girl Blue was pushed back from 1 November to 15 November.

In mid-September, The Deep Dark was brought forward two weeks from 29 to 15 November.

== January–March ==
⌀ Denotes a film that was publicly screened prior to 2023, be it through film festivals, premieres or releases in other countries
† Denotes a film released through a streaming service, not theatrically
‡ Denotes a film primarily not in the French language

Opening		English Title	Native Title	Director	Cast	Studio	Ref.
J A N U A R Y	4	Father & Soldier ⌀‡	Tirailleurs	Mathieu Vadepied	Omar Sy, Jonas Bloquet	Gaumont	
J A N U A R Y	4	Sixteen ⌀	16 Ans	Philippe Lioret	Jean-Pierre Lorit, Marie Dompnier	Paname Distribution	
J A N U A R Y	4	This One Summer ⌀	Cet Été-Là	Éric Lartigau	Marina Foïs, Gael García Bernal, Chiara Mastroianni	StudioCanal	
J A N U A R Y	4	White Paradise ⌀	Les Survivants	Guillaume Renusson	Denis Ménochet, Zar Amir Ebrahimi, Victoire Du Bois	Ad Vitam Distribution	
J A N U A R Y	11	Rascals ⌀	Les Rascals	Jimmy Laporal-Trésor	Victor Meutelet	The Jokers Films	
J A N U A R Y	11	Scarlet ⌀	L'Envol	Pietro Marcello	Louis Garrel, Noémie Lvovsky, Yolande Moreau	Le Pacte	
J A N U A R Y	11	Swing Rendez-vous ⌀	Swing Rendez-vous	Gérome Barry	Gérome Barry, Estéban, Arielle Dombasle, Bernard Pivot	Epicentre Films	
J A N U A R Y	11	The Line ⌀	La Ligne	Ursula Meier	Stéphanie Blanchoud, Valeria Bruni Tedeschi, India Hair, Dali Benssalah, Benjamin Biolay, Éric Ruf, Jean-François Stévenin	Diaphana Distribution	
J A N U A R Y	11	Top Dogs ⌀	Les Cadors	Julien Guetta	Jean-Paul Rouve, Grégoire Ludig, Michel Blanc, Marie Gillain	Jour2Fête	
J A N U A R Y	11	Two Tickets to Greece ⌀	Les Cyclades	Marc Fitoussi	Laure Calamy, Olivia Côte, Kristin Scott Thomas	Memento Distribution	
J A N U A R Y	11	Woman at Sea ⌀	Grand Marin	Dinara Drukarova	Dinara Drukarova, Sam Louwyck, Björn Hlynur Haraldsson	Rezo Films	
J A N U A R Y	18	Bright Women ⌀	Brillantes	Sylvie Gautier	Céline Sallette, Camille Lellouche, Eye Haïdara, Julie Ferrier, Bruno Salomone	Alba Films	
J A N U A R Y	18	Earwig ⌀	Earwig	Lucile Hadzihalilovic	Alex Lawther, Paul Hilton, Romola Garai	New Story Films	
J A N U A R Y	18	Le Clan	Le Clan	Éric Fraticelli	Éric Fraticelli, Denis Braccini, Philippe Corti, Joséphine de Meaux	Pan-Européenne	
J A N U A R Y	18	The Beautiful Blue	La Belle Bleue	Ronan de Suin	Ioanna André, Ronan de Suin	Saint-André-des-Arts	
J A N U A R Y	18	The (in)famous Youssef Salem ⌀	Youssef Salem a du Succès	Baya Kasmi	Ramzy Bedia, Noémie Lvovsky	Tandem Films	
J A N U A R Y	18	The Lulus ⌀	La Guerre des Lulus	Yann Samuell	Isabelle Carré, Didier Bourdon, François Damiens, Alex Lutz, Ahmed Sylla	Wild Bunch	
J A N U A R Y	25	Argonuts ⌀	Pattie et la Colère de Poséidon	David Alaux, Éric Tosti & Jean-François Tosti	Christophe Lemoine, Emmanuel Curtil, Pierre Richard	Apollo Films	
J A N U A R Y	25	Ashkal ⌀‡	Ashkal	Youssef Chebbi	Fatma Oussaifi, Mohamed Grayaâ	Jour2Fête	
J A N U A R Y	25	Dark Heart of the Forest ⌀	Le Cœur Noir des Forêts	Serge Mirzabekiantz	Elsa Houben, Aurélia Petit	Origine Films	
J A N U A R Y	25	Divertimento ⌀	Divertimento	Marie-Castille Mention-Schaar	Oulaya Amamra, Lina El Arabi, Niels Arestrup	Le Pacte	
J A N U A R Y	25	Neneh Superstar ⌀	Neneh Superstar	Ramzi Ben Sliman	Oumy Bruni Garrel, Maïwenn, Aïssa Maïga, Steve Tientcheu, Cédric Kahn, Richard Sammel	Gaumont	
J A N U A R Y	25	No Dogs or Italians Allowed ⌀	Interdit aux Chiens et aux Italiens	Alain Ughetto	Ariane Ascaride	Gebeka Films	
J A N U A R Y	25	Quitte pour la Peur ⌀	Quitte pour la Peur	Bruno François-Boucher	François Le Roux	Bon Voyage Films	
J A N U A R Y	25	Return to Seoul ⌀	Retour à Séoul	Davy Chou	Oh Kwang-rok, Kim Sun-young, Louis-Do de Lencquesaing	Les Films du Losange	
J A N U A R Y	25	Saloum ⌀	Saloum	Jean Luc Herbulot	Yann Gael	CGR Cinémas	
J A N U A R Y	25	Schoolmates!	Un Petit Miracle	Sophie Boudre	Alice Pol, Jonathan Zaccaï, Eddy Mitchell, Émilie Gavois-Kahn, Régis Laspalès	UGC	
J A N U A R Y	25	Vaincre ou mourir ⌀	Vaincre ou mourir	Paul Mignot & Vincent Mottez	Hugo Becker, Rod Paradot, Grégory Fitoussi, Constance Gay, Jean-Hugues Anglade	Saje distribution	
J A N U A R Y	25	Where Life Begins ⌀‡	Tu Choisiras la Vie	Stéphane Freiss	Riccardo Scamarcio, Lou de Laâge	JHR Films	
F E B R U A R Y	1	Amore Mio ⌀	Amore Mio	Guillaume Gouix	Alysson Paradis, Élodie Bouchez, Félix Maritaud	Urban Distribution	
F E B R U A R Y	1	Astérix & Obélix: The Middle Kingdom	Astérix & Obélix: L'Empire du Milieu	Guillaume Canet	Guillaume Canet, Gilles Lellouche, Vincent Cassel, Marion Cotillard, Jonathan Cohen, Ramzy Bedia, Linh Dan Pham, José Garcia, Manu Payet, Pierre Richard, Zlatan Ibrahimović, Philippe Katerine, Jérôme Commandeur, Angèle, Matthieu Chedid	Pathé	
F E B R U A R Y	1	Dounia and the Princess of Aleppo ⌀	Dounia et la Princesse d'Alep	Marya Zarif & André Kadi	Manuel Tadros	Haut et Court	
F E B R U A R Y	1	Mother and Son ⌀	Un Petit Frère	Léonor Serraille	Annabelle Lengronne, Stéphane Bak, Ahmed Sylla, Laetitia Dosch	Diaphana Distribution	
F E B R U A R Y	1	Small-town Boys ⌀	Des Garçons de Province	Gaël Lépingle	Serge Renko	La Traverse	
F E B R U A R Y	1	Tel Aviv Beirut ⌀	Tel Aviv Beyrouth	Michale Boganim	Sofia Essaïdi, Sarah Adler	Dulac Distribution	
F E B R U A R Y	1	The Mountain ⌀	La Montagne	Thomas Salvador	Thomas Salvador, Louise Bourgoin, Martine Chevallier	Le Pacte	
F E B R U A R Y	8	Alibi.com 2	Alibi.com 2	Philippe Lacheau	Philippe Lacheau, Élodie Fontan, Tarek Boudali, Julien Arruti, Nathalie Baye, Didier Bourdon, Philippe Duquesne, Gérard Jugnot, Arielle Dombasle, Gad Elmaleh	StudioCanal	
F E B R U A R Y	8	Astrakan ⌀	Astrakan	David Depesseville	Jehnny Beth, Bastien Bouillon	New Story Films	
F E B R U A R Y	8	Beating Sun ⌀	Tant que le soleil frappe	Philippe Petit	Swann Arlaud, Sarah Adler	Pyramide Films	
F E B R U A R Y	8	For My Country ⌀	Pour la France	Rachid Hami	Karim Leklou, Shaïn Boumedine, Lubna Azabal, Samir Guesmi, Laurent Lafitte, Vivian Sung	Memento Distribution	
F E B R U A R Y	8	Lockdown Tower ⌀	La Tour	Guillaume Nicloux	Hatik	Wild Bunch	
F E B R U A R Y	8	Princes of the Desert ⌀	Zodi et Téhu, Frères du Désert	Éric Barbier	Alexandra Lamy, Youssef Hajdi	SND	
F E B R U A R Y	8	Remains of the Wind ⌀‡	Restos do Vento	Tiago Guedes	Albano Jerónimo, Nuno Lopes, Isabel Abreu	Alfama Films	
F E B R U A R Y	8	Slumlord ⌀	Le Marchand de Sable	Steve Achiepo	Moussa Mansaly, Aïssa Maïga, Ophélie Bau, Benoît Magimel	The Jokers Films	
F E B R U A R Y	8	The Great Magic ⌀	La Grande Magie	Noémie Lvovsky	Denis Podalydès, Sergi López, Judith Chemla, Noémie Lvovsky, François Morel, Damien Bonnard, Rebecca Marder, Laurent Stocker	Ad Vitam Distribution	
F E B R U A R Y	8	The Snow Must Go On ⌀	Les Têtes Givrées	Stéphane Cazes	Clovis Cornillac, Claudia Tagbo	UGC	
F E B R U A R Y	15	A Happy Man	Un Homme Heureux	Tristan Séguéla	Fabrice Luchini, Catherine Frot, Philippe Katerine, Artus	Gaumont	
F E B R U A R Y	15	Le Grand Cirque	Le Grand Cirque	Booder & Gaëlle Falzerana	Booder, Gérard Giroudon	Apollo Films	
F E B R U A R Y	15	Marlowe ⌀‡	Marlowe	Neil Jordan	Liam Neeson, Diane Kruger, Jessica Lange, Adewale Akinnuoye-Agbaje, Colm Meaney, Daniela Melchior, Alan Cumming, Danny Huston	Metropolitan Filmexport	
F E B R U A R Y	15	Oh My Goodness! ⌀	Juste Ciel!	Laurent Tirard	Valérie Bonneton, Camille Chamoux, Claire Nadeau, Guilaine Londez, Sidse Babett Knudsen, François Morel	Le Pacte	
F E B R U A R Y	15	Tchaikovsky's Wife ⌀‡	Жена Чайковского	Kirill Serebrennikov	Alyona Mikhaylova, Odin Biron, Yuliya Aug, Miron Fyodorov, Alexander Gorchilin, Filipp Avdeyev	BAC Films	
F E B R U A R Y	15	The Astronaut ⌀	L'Astronaute	Nicolas Giraud	Nicolas Giraud, Mathieu Kassovitz, Hélène Vincent, Hippolyte Girardot, Bruno Lochet	Diaphana Distribution	
F E B R U A R Y	22	A Tale of Shemroon ⌀‡	Chevalier Noir	Emad Aleebrahim Dehkordi	Iman Sayad Borhani, Payar Allahyari, Masoumeh Beygi, Behzad Dorani	Jour2Fête	
F E B R U A R Y	22	Heartbeast ⌀	Pulse	Aino Suni	Elsi Sloan, Carmen Kassovitz, Camille, Adel Bencherif	Wayna Pitch	
F E B R U A R Y	22	A Great Friend	Les Choses Simples	Éric Besnard	Lambert Wilson, Grégory Gadebois, Marie Gillain	SND	
F E B R U A R Y	22	Lie with Me ⌀	Arrête avec tes Mensonges	Olivier Peyon	Guillaume De Tonquédec, Victor Belmondo, Jérémy Gillet, Julien de Saint Jean, Guilaine Londez	KMBO Films	
F E B R U A R Y	22	Littles Ones ⌀	Petites	Julie Lerat-Gersant	Romane Bohringer, Victoire Du Bois, Pili Groyne	Haut et Court	
F E B R U A R Y	22	Sugar and Stars	À la Belle Étoile	Sébastien Tulard	Riadh Belaïche, Loubna Abidar, Pascal Légitimus	BAC Films	
F E B R U A R Y	22	Whale Nation	Les Gardiennes de la Planète	Jean-Albert Lièvre	Jean Dujardin	Pan-Européenne	
F E B R U A R Y	24	BDE †	BDE	Michaël Youn	Michaël Youn, Helena Noguerra, Lucien Jean-Baptiste, Vincent Desagnat, Rayane Bensetti, Ludovik Day, Manon Azem, Lola Dubini, Gilbert Melki, Tomer Sisley, Judith El Zein, Michèle Laroque, Virginie Hocq, Benjamin Morgaine, Sébastien Chabal	Amazon Prime Video	
M A R C H	1	Sons of Ramses ⌀	Goutte d'Or	Clément Cogitore	Karim Leklou, Malik Zidi	Diaphana Distribution	
M A R C H	1	Sweet Little Things	Les Petites Victoires	Mélanie Auffret	Julia Piaton, Michel Blanc, Lionel Abelanski, Marie Bunel, India Hair	Zinc Film	
M A R C H	1	The Dam ⌀‡	Al-Sadd	Ali Cherri	Maher El Khair	Dulac Distribution	
M A R C H	1	The Sitting Duck ⌀	La Syndicaliste	Jean-Paul Salomé	Isabelle Huppert, Grégory Gadebois, Marina Foïs, François-Xavier Demaison, Pierre Deladonchamps, Alexandra Maria Lara, Yvan Attal	Le Pacte	
M A R C H	1	The Water ⌀‡	El Agua	Elena López Riera	Bárbara Lennie, Nieve de Medina	Les Films du Losange	
M A R C H	8	And Yet We Were All Blind ⌀	Toi Non Plus Tu N'as Rien Vu	Béatrice Pollet	Maud Wyler, Géraldine Nakache, Grégoire Colin, Fanny Cottençon, Ophélia Kolb	Jour2Fête	
M A R C H	8	En Marche Vers l'Effondrement! ⌀	En Marche Vers l'Effondrement!	Alessandro di Giuseppe & Adrien Juncker	Alessandro di Giuseppe, Benoît Delépine, Gustave Kervern		
M A R C H	8	I Have Electric Dreams ⌀‡	Tengo Sueños Eléctricos	Valentina Maurel	Daniela Marin Navarro, Reinaldo Amien Gutierrez, Vivian Rodriguez	Geko Films	
M A R C H	8	Let Her Kill You	Seule: Les Dossiers Silvercloud	Jérôme Dassier	Asia Argento, Jeanne Balibar	Alba Films	
M A R C H	8	Like an Actress ⌀	Comme une Actrice	Sébastien Bailly	Julie Gayet, Benjamin Biolay, Agathe Bonitzer	Epicentre Films	
M A R C H	8	Music ‡	Musik	Angela Schanelec	Aliocha Schneider, Agathe Bonitzer	Shellac Films	
M A R C H	8	Nayola ⌀‡	Nayola	José Miguel Ribeiro	Elisângela Kadina Rita, Catarina André, Marinela Furtado Veloso	Urban Distribution	
M A R C H	8	The Blaze ⌀	En Plein Feu	Quentin Reynaud	Alex Lutz, André Dussollier	Apollo Films	
M A R C H	8	The Crime Is Mine	Mon Crime	François Ozon	Nadia Tereszkiewicz, Dany Boon, Isabelle Huppert, Fabrice Luchini, André Dussolier, Rebecca Marder	Gaumont	
M A R C H	15	A Male ⌀‡	Un Varón	Fabián Hernández	Felipe Ramirez, Juanita Carrillo Orti, Diego Alexander Mayorga	Destiny Films	
M A R C H	15	Houria ⌀‡	Houria	Mounia Meddour	Lyna Khoudri, Rachida Brakni	Le Pacte	
M A R C H	15	Le Monde d'Après 2	Le Monde d'Après 2	Laurent Firode	Karine Dubernet, Herrade Von Meier, Élodie Menant	Bon Voyage Films	
M A R C H	15	Lointaine Andromède	Lointaine Andromède	Damien Faure	Louise Faure, Damien Faure, Jacques Faure	Saint-André-des-Arts	
M A R C H	15	The Book of Wonders	La Chambre des Merveilles	Lisa Azuelos	Alexandra Lamy, Muriel Robin	SND	
M A R C H	15	The Midwife	Sage-Homme	Jennifer Devoldère	Karin Viard, Steve Tientcheu	Warner Bros. Pictures	
M A R C H	17	In His Shadow †	Le Roi des Ombres	Marc Fouchard	Kaaris, Alassane Diong, Assa Sylla	Netflix	
M A R C H	22	Blind Willow, Sleeping Woman ⌀	Saules Aveugles, Femme Endormie	Pierre Földes	Pierre Földes	Gebeka Films	
M A R C H	22	Grand Expectations ⌀	De Grandes Espérances	Sylvain Desclous	Rebecca Marder, Benjamin Lavernhe, Emmanuelle Bercot, Marc Barbé, Pascal Elso	The Jokers Films	
M A R C H	22	Holy Emy ⌀‡	Αγία Έμυ	Araceli Lemos	Abigael Loma, Hasmine Kilip, Irene Inglesi	Utopie Films	
M A R C H	22	Je M'Abandonne à Toi	Je M'Abandonne à Toi	Cheyenne Carron	Johnny Amaro, Anne Sicard, Laurent Borel	Hésiode	
M A R C H	22	Love According to Dalva ⌀	Dalva	Emmanuelle Nicot	Zelda Samson, Alexis Manenti, Marie Denarnaud	Diaphana Distribution	
M A R C H	22	On the Wandering Paths	Sur les Chemins Noirs	Denis Imbert	Jean Dujardin, Jonathan Zaccaï, Joséphine Japy, Izïa Higelin, Anny Duperey	Apollo Films	
M A R C H	22	The Blue Caftan ⌀‡	Le Bleu du Caftan	Nabil Ayouch	Lubna Azabal, Saleh Bakri	Ad Vitam Distribution	
M A R C H	22	The Pack ⌀‡	La Jauría	Andrés Ramírez Pulido	Jhojan Estiven Jimenez, Maicol Andrés Jimenez	Pyramide Films	
M A R C H	29	All Your Faces	Je Verrai Toujours Vos Visages	Jeanne Herry	Adèle Exarchopoulos, Dali Benssalah, Leïla Bekhti, Élodie Bouchez, Suliane Brahim, Jean-Pierre Darroussin, Grégory Gadebois, Gilles Lellouche, Miou-Miou, Denis Podalydès, Fred Testot	StudioCanal	
M A R C H	29	Apaches: Gang of Paris	Apaches	Romain Quirot	Alice Isaaz, Niels Schneider, Rod Paradot, Artus, Émilie Gavois-Kahn, Bruno Lochet, Rossy de Palma, Dominique Pinon	Tandem Films	
M A R C H	29	Captain Volkonogov Escaped ⌀‡	Капитан Волконогов бежал	Natalya Merkulova & Aleksey Chupov	Yuri Borisov, Timofey Tribuntsev, Aleksandr Yatsenko	Kinovista	
M A R C H	29	Grand Paris	Grand Paris	Martin Jauvat	William Lebghil, Sébastien Chassagne	JHR Films	
M A R C H	29	On the Adamant ⌀	Sur l'Adamant	Nicolas Philibert		TS Productions	
M A R C H	29	Serial Driver	Bonne Conduite	Jonathan Barré	Laure Calamy, Nicolas Marié, Tchéky Karyo, Olivier Marchal	Pan-Européenne	
M A R C H	29	The Kings of the World ⌀‡	Los Reyes del Mundo	Laura Mora	Carlos Andrés Castañeda, Davison Florez, Brahian Acevedo	Rezo Films	
M A R C H	29	The Rust ⌀‡	La Roya	Juan Sebastián Mesa	Juan Daniel Ortiz Hernandez, Paula Andrea Cano, Laura Gutiérrez Ardila	Dublin Films	
M A R C H	29	Voyages en Italie	Voyages en Italie	Sophie Letourneur	Philippe Katerine, Sophie Letourneur	Météore Films	

== April–June ==
⌀ Denotes a film that was publicly screened prior to 2023, be it through film festivals, premieres or releases in other countries
† Denotes a film released through a streaming service, not theatrically
‡ Denotes a film primarily not in the French language

Opening		English Title	Native Title	Director	Cast	Studio	Ref.
A P R I L	5	A Cat's Life	Mon Chat et Moi, La Grande Aventure de Rroû	Guillaume Maidatchevsky	Capucine Sainson-Fabresse, Corinne Masiero	UGC	
A P R I L	5	Disco Boy	Disco Boy	Giacomo Abbruzzese	Franz Rogowski, Laetitia Ky	KMBO Films	
A P R I L	5	Loving Memories ⌀	C'est Mon Homme	Guillaume Bureau	Leïla Bekhti, Karim Leklou, Louise Bourgoin	BAC Films	
A P R I L	5	My Sole Desire ⌀	À Mon Seul Désir	Lucie Borleteau	Zita Hanrot, Louise Chevillotte, Laure Giappiconi, Melvil Poupaud	Pyramide Films	
A P R I L	5	Normal	Normale	Olivier Babinet	Benoît Poelvoorde, Steve Tientcheu	Haut et Court	
A P R I L	5	The Assembly Line	L'Établi	Mathias Gokalp	Swann Arlaud, Mélanie Thierry, Olivier Gourmet, Denis Podalydès	Le Pacte	
A P R I L	5	The Three Musketeers: D'Artagnan	Les Trois Mousquetaires: D'Artagnan	Martin Bourboulon	François Civil, Vincent Cassel, Romain Duris, Pio Marmaï, Eva Green, Lyna Khoudri, Louis Garrel, Vicky Krieps, Jacob Fortune-Lloyd, Alexis Michalik	Pathé	
A P R I L	12	A Love Story ⌀	Une Histoire d'Amour	Alexis Michalik	Alexis Michalik	Le Pacte	
A P R I L	12	Alma Viva ⌀‡	Alma Viva	Cristèle Alves Meira	Ana Padrão	Tandem Films	
A P R I L	12	How to Survive Without Mum	10 Jours Encore Sans Maman	Ludovic Bernard	Franck Dubosc, Aure Atika, Alexis Michalik, Helena Noguerra, Annelise Hesme	StudioCanal	
A P R I L	12	Killing Blues	Les Complices	Cécilia Rouaud	François Damiens, William Lebghil, Laura Felpin, Bruno Podalydès, Vanessa Paradis	SND	
A P R I L	12	Soul Mates	Les Âmes Sœurs	André Téchiné	Benjamin Voisin, Noémie Merlant, André Marcon, Audrey Dana	Ad Vitam Distribution	
A P R I L	12	The Channel ⌀	Le Prix du Passage	Thierry Binisti	Alice Isaaz, Adam Bessa, Ilan Debrabant, Catherine Salée	Diaphana Distribution	
A P R I L	12	Wolf and Dog ⌀‡	Lobo e Cão	Cláudia Varejão	Ana Cabral, Ruben Pimenta, Cristiana Branquinho	Epicentre Films	
A P R I L	19	Before We Collapse	Avant l'Effondrement	Alice Zeniter & Benoît Volnais	Niels Schneider, Ariane Labed, Souheila Yacoub, Myriem Akheddiou	Pyramide Films	
A P R I L	19	Habib ⌀	Habib, la Grande Aventure	Benoît Mariage	Bastien Ughetto, Catherine Deneuve, Thomas Solivérès	KMBO Films	
A P R I L	19	Junkyard Dog	Chien de la Casse	Jean-Baptiste Durand	Raphaël Quenard, Anthony Bajon, Galatea Bellugi	BAC Films	
A P R I L	19	La Plus Belle pour Aller Danser	La Plus Belle pour Aller Danser	Victoria Bedos	Philippe Katerine, Pierre Richard, Alice Belaïdi, Firmine Richard, Guy Marchand, Olivier Saladin	Universal Pictures	
A P R I L	19	Life for Real	La Vie pour de Vrai	Dany Boon	Dany Boon, Charlotte Gainsbourg, Kad Merad	Pathé	
A P R I L	19	Savage Days	Jours Sauvages	David Lanzmann	Alain-Fabien Delon, Redouanne Harjane, Mikaël Fitoussi, Michaël Abiteboul, Caroline Ducey	Rezo Films	
A P R I L	19	The Last Queen ⌀‡	La Dernière Reine	Damien Ounouri & Adila Bendimerad	Adila Bendimerad, Dali Benssalah, Nadia Tereszkiewicz	Jour2Fête	
A P R I L	26	Big Kids	Quand Tu Seras Grand	Andréa Bescond & Éric Métayer	Vincent Macaigne, Aïssa Maïga, Évelyne Istria	Ad Vitam Distribution	
A P R I L	26	Burning Days ⌀‡	Kurak Günler	Emin Alper	Selahattin Paşalı, Ekin Koç, Selin Yeninci	Memento Distribution	
A P R I L	26	Dirty Difficult Dangerous ⌀‡	Dirty Difficult Dangerous	Wissam Charaf	Clara Couturet, Ziad Jallad, Darina Al Joundi	JHR Films	
A P R I L	26	Ma Langue au Chat	Ma Langue au Chat	Cécile Telerman	Zabou Breitman, Pascal Elbé, Marie-Josée Croze, Pascal Demolon, Camille Lellouche, Mélanie Bernier, Samuel Le Bihan, Mathias Mlekuz	Zinc Film	
A P R I L	26	The Young Imam	Le Jeune Imam	Kim Chapiron	Abdulah Sissoko	Le Pacte	
A P R I L	26	Our Tiny Little Wedding	Notre Tout Petit Petit Mariage	Frédéric Quiring	Ahmed Sylla, Camille Lou, Grégoire Bonnet, Marc Riso, Barbara Bolotner, Anne Caillon, Andréa Ferréol	UGC	
A P R I L	26	Streams ⌀‡	Amel & les Fauves	Mehdi Hmili	Afef Ben Mahmoud	La Vingt-Cinquième Heure	
A P R I L	28	AKA †	AKA	Morgan S. Dalibert	Alban Lenoir, Eric Cantona, Thibault de Montalembert, Sveva Alviti	Netflix	
M A Y	3	A Chance to Win	Pour l'Honneur	Philippe Guillard	Olivier Marchal, Olivia Bonamy, Mathieu Madénian, Philippe Duquesne	Apollo Films	
M A Y	3	La Graine †	La Graine	Éloïse Lang	Marie Papillon, Stacy Martin, François Damiens, Pablo Pauly, Victoire Du Bois	Amazon Prime Video	
M A Y	3	La Marginale	La Marginale	Frank Cimière	Corinne Masiero	Sony Pictures	
M A Y	3	One Year, One Night ⌀‡	Un Año, Una Noche	Isaki Lacuesta	Nahuel Pérez Biscayart, Noémie Merlant, Quim Gutiérrez, Natalia de Molina, C.Tangana, Bruno Todeschini	StudioCanal	
M A Y	3	Summer Scars ⌀	Nos Cérémonies	Simon Rieth	Simon Baur, Raymond Baur, Maïra Villena	The Jokers Films	
M A Y	3	The Gravity	La Gravité	Cédric Ido	Jean-Baptiste Anoumon, Steve Tientcheu, Thierry Godard, Hafsia Herzi	Alba Films	
M A Y	3	Time Out	Temps Mort	Ève Duchemin	Karim Leklou, Issaka Sawadogo, Johan Leysen	Pyramide Films	
M A Y	10	Hawaii	Hawaï	Mélissa Drigeard	Bérénice Bejo, Manu Payet, Élodie Bouchez, Émilie Caen, Pierre Deladonchamps, Nicolas Duvauchelle, Eye Haïdara, William Lebghil	Warner Bros. Pictures	
M A Y	10	Kill Dating	Kill Dating	Olivier Goujon	Anthony Gatignol, Nicolas Bedu, Samuel Fernand	Festizicnema	
M A Y	10	Le Principal	Le Principal	Chad Chenouga	Roschdy Zem, Marina Hands, Yolande Moreau	Le Pacte	
M A Y	10	The Course of Life	Le Cours de la Vie	Frédéric Sojcher	Agnès Jaoui, Jonathan Zaccaï, Géraldine Nakache	Jour2Fête	
M A Y	10	The Daughter of Albino Rodrigue	La Fille d'Albino Rodrigue	Christine Dory	Émilie Dequenne, Galatea Bellugi, Philippe Duquesne, Samir Guesmi, Romane Bohringer	ARP Sélection	
M A Y	10	The Lost Boys	Le Paradis	Zeno Graton	Khalil Ben Gharbia, Julien de Saint Jean, Eye Haïdara	Rezo Films	
M A Y	16 (Note: Opened in the evening, concurrently with its premiere at the Cannes Film Festival)	Jeanne du Barry	Jeanne du Barry	Maïwenn	Maïwenn, Johnny Depp, Pierre Richard, Noémie Lvovsky, Benjamin Lavernhe, Louis Garrel, Melvil Poupaud, Pascal Greggory, India Hair	Le Pacte	
M A Y	17	L'Homme Debout	L'Homme Debout	Florence Vignon	Zita Hanrot, Jacques Gamblin	Orange Studio	
M A Y	17	Monsieur Constant	Monsieur Constant	Alan Simon	Jean-Claude Drouot, Cali, Danièle Évenou, Sacha Bourdo, Jean-Yves Lafesse	Babaika	
M A Y	17	Umami ⌀	Umami	Slony Sow	Gérard Depardieu, Kyōzō Nagatsuka, Pierre Richard, Rod Paradot, Sandrine Bonnaire, Akira Emoto, Bastien Bouillon, Zinedine Soualem, Kyoko Koizumi, Antoine Duléry, Assa Sylla	Zinc Film	
M A Y	24	Just the Two of Us	L'Amour et les Forêts	Valérie Donzelli	Virginie Efira, Melvil Poupaud, Dominique Reymond, Romane Bohringer, Virginie Ledoyen, Marie Rivière, Laurence Côte	Diaphana Distribution	
M A Y	24	The King of Algiers	Omar la Fraise	Elias Belkeddar	Reda Kateb, Tahar Rahim, Lyna Khoudri, Benoît Magimel, Ramzy Bédia	StudioCanal	
M A Y	31	Red Island	L'Île Rouge	Robin Campillo	Nadia Tereszkiewicz, Quim Gutiérrez, Sophie Guillemin, David Serero	Memento Distribution	
M A Y	31	Sparta ⌀‡	Sparta	Ulrich Seidl	Georg Friedrich, Hans-Michael Rehberg	Damned Distribution	
J U N E	2	Medellín †	Medellín	Franck Gastambide	Franck Gastambide, Ramzy Bedia, Mike Tyson, Anouar Toubali, Raymond Cruz	Amazon Prime Video	
J U N E	7	Des Mains en Or	Des Mains en Or	Isabelle Mergault	Lambert Wilson, Josiane Balasko, Sylvie Testud	Zinc Film	
J U N E	7	Marinette	Marinette	Virginie Verrier	Garance Marillier, Emilie Dequenne, Fred Testot, Sylvie Testud, Alban Lenoir, Caroline Proust	The Jokers Films	
J U N E	7	Rule 34 ⌀‡	Regra 34	Júlia Murat	Sol Miranda, Lucas Andrade, Lorena Comparato	Wayna Pitch	
J U N E	7	The Island ⌀‡	Insula	Anca Damian	Alexander Bălănescu, Ada Milea	Eurozoom	
J U N E	7	Wow!	Wahou!	Bruno Podalydès	Karin Viard, Bruno Podalydès, Sabine Azéma, Eddy Mitchell, Agnès Jaoui, Isabelle Candelier, Yann Frisch, Manu Payet, Félix Moati, Roschdy Zem, Denis Podalydès	UGC	
J U N E	14	Carmen ⌀‡	Carmen	Benjamin Millepied	Paul Mescal, Melissa Barrera, Elsa Pataky, Rossy de Palma	Pathé	
J U N E	14	Love Life ⌀‡	ラブ ライフ	Kōji Fukada	Fumino Kimura, Kento Nagayama, Hirona Yamazaki, Tomorowo Taguchi, Mito Natsume	Art House Films	
J U N E	14	Mother Valley	La Nuit du Verre d'Eau	Carlos Chahine	Nathalie Baye, Pierre Rochefort	Jour2Fête	
J U N E	14	Spare Keys	Fifi	Jeanne Aslan & Paul Saintillan	Céleste Brunnquell, Quentin Dolmaire	New Story Films	
J U N E	14	Stars at Noon ⌀‡	Stars at Noon	Claire Denis	Margaret Qualley, Joe Alwyn, Benny Safdie, Danny Ramirez, John C. Reilly	Ad Vitam Distribution	
J U N E	14	The Peace and Love Process	Le Processus de Paix	Ilan Klipper	Camille Chamoux, Damien Bonnard, Jeanne Balibar, Ariane Ascaride	Le Pacte	
J U N E	14	What Now My Friend	Sexygénaires	Robin Sykes	Thierry Lhermitte, Patrick Timsit, Marie Bunel, Zineb Triki, Grégoire Oestermann, Olivia Côte, Xavier Robic	Apollo Films	
J U N E	21	La Fille et le Garçon ⌀	La Fille et le Garçon	Jean-Marie Besset	Arielle Dombasle, Aurélien Recoing	Panoceanic Films	
J U N E	21	La Sorcière et le Martien ⌀	La Sorcière et le Martien	Thomas Bardinet	Yasmine Kherbouche, Kylian Mahamoud, Théodore Dupleix	DHR Distribution	
J U N E	21	Magnificat	Magnificat	Virginie Sauveur	Karin Viard, François Berléand, Nicolas Cazalé	Alba Films	
J U N E	21	Nezouh ⌀‡	Nezouh	Soudade Kaadan	Kinda Alloush, Samer al-Masry	Pyramide Films	
J U N E	21	Police Fever	38°5 Quai des Orfèvres	Benjamin Lehrer	Didier Bourdon, Caroline Anglade, Pascal Demolon, Artus, Frédérique Bel	KMBO Films	
J U N E	21	Pornomelancolía ⌀‡	Pornomelancolía	Manuel Abramovich	Lalo Santos, Brandon Ley	Epicentre Films	
J U N E	28	Mayhem!	Farang	Xavier Gens	Nassim Lyes, Olivier Gourmet, Vithaya Pansringarm	StudioCanal	
J U N E	28	Mr. Putifar's Wacky Plan	Les Vengeances de Maître Poutifard	Pierre-François Martin-Laval	Christian Clavier, Isabelle Nanty	UGC	
J U N E	28	Passages ‡	Passages	Ira Sachs	Franz Rogowski, Ben Whishaw, Adèle Exarchopoulos	Paname Distribution	
J U N E	28	The Siren ‡	The Siren	Sepideh Farsi	Mina Kavani, Hadmidreza Djavdan	BAC Films	

== July–September ==
⌀ Denotes a film that was publicly screened prior to 2023, be it through film festivals, premieres or releases in other countries
† Denotes a film released through a streaming service, not theatrically
‡ Denotes a film primarily not in the French language

Opening		English Title	Native Title	Director	Cast	Studio	Ref.
J U L Y	5	Everybody Calls Me Mike	Tout le Monde M'Appelle Mike	Guillaume Bonnier	Daphné Patakia, Pierre Lottin	À Vif Cinémas	
J U L Y	5	Four Daughters ‡	Les Filles d'Olfa	Kaouther Ben Hania	Hend Sabry, Majd Mastoura	Jour2Fête	
J U L Y	5	Ladybug & Cat Noir: Awakening	Miraculous: Le Film	Jérémy Zag	Anouck Hautbois, Benjamin Bollen	SND	
J U L Y	5	Luise	Luise	Matthias Luthardt	Luise Aschenbrenner, Christa Théret, Leonard Kunz, Matthias Habich, David Kross	Pyramide Films	
J U L Y	5	Strangers by Night	Une Nuit	Alex Lutz	Karin Viard, Alex Lutz	StudioCanal	
J U L Y	5	Yo Mama	Yo Mama	Leïla Sy & Amadou Mariko	Claudia Tagbo, Zaho, Sophie-Marie Larrouy, Jean-Pascal Zadi	Gaumont	
J U L Y	6	Gold Brick †	Cash	Jérémie Rozan	Raphaël Quenard, Agathe Rousselle, Igor Gotesman, Antoine Gouy, Youssef Hajdi, Grégoire Colin, Nina Meurisse, Stéphan Wojtowicz, Slimane Dazi	Netflix	
J U L Y	6	La Tête dans les Étoiles †	La Tête dans les Étoiles	Emmanuel Gillibert	Hakim Jemili, Alice Pol, François-Xavier Demaison, Nawell Madani, Olivia Côte, Beatrice Rosen	Amazon Prime Video	
J U L Y	7	A Place to Fight For †	Une Zone à Défendre	Romain Cogitore	Lyna Khoudri, François Civil	Disney+	
J U L Y	12	About Dry Grasses ‡	Kuru Otlar Üstüne	Nuri Bilge Ceylan	Deniz Celiloğlu, Merve Dizdar, Musab Ekici	Memento Distribution	
J U L Y	12	Ademoka's Education ⌀‡	Оқу Iздеген Адемока	Adilkhan Yerzhanov	Adema Yerzhanova, Daniyar Alshinov, Bolat Kalymbetov	Destiny Films	
J U L Y	12	Between Us	Entre Nous	Jude Bauman	Amandine Noworyta, Iris Jodorowsky, Jean-François Stévenin	KapFilms	
J U L Y	12	Green Tide	Les Algues Vertes	Pierre Jolivet	Céline Sallette, Nina Meurisse, Julie Ferrier, Pasquale d'Inca, Clémentine Poidatz, Jonathan Lambert	Haut et Court	
J U L Y	12	Little Jesus	Petit Jésus	Julien Rigoulot	Antoine Bertrand, Gérard Darmon, Bruno Sanches, Caroline Anglade, Youssef Hajdi	Wild Bunch	
J U L Y	19	Hounds	Les Meutes	Kamal Lazraq	Ayoub Elaid, Abdellatif Masstouri, Mohamed Hmimsa	Pyramide Films	
J U L Y	19	Rapture ⌀	Paula	Angela Ottobah	Aline Hélan-Boudon, Finnegan Oldfield, Océan	Arizona Distribution	
J U L Y	19	Sous le Tapis	Sous le Tapis	Camille Japy	Ariane Ascaride, Bérénice Bejo, Thomas Scimeca, Marilou Aussilloux	Paname Distribution	
J U L Y	19	Subtraction ⌀‡	تفریق	Mani Haghighi	Taraneh Alidoosti, Navid Mohammadzadeh	Diaphana Distribution	
J U L Y	26	A Wonderful Girl	Sur la Branche	Marie Garel-Weiss	Daphné Patakia, Benoît Poelvoorde, Agnès Jaoui, Raphaël Quenard	Pyramide Films	
J U L Y	26	Blanquita ⌀‡	Blanquita	Fernando Guzzoni	Laura López, Alejandro Goic, Amparo Noguera, Marcelo Alonso, Daniela Ramírez	ASC Distribution	
J U L Y	26	Juniors	Juniors	Hugo P. Thomas	Vanessa Paradis	The Jokers Films	
J U L Y	26	Les Déguns 2	Les Déguns 2	Cyrille Droux & Claude Zidi Jr.	Karim Jebli, Nordine Salhi, Sofiane, Soprano, Soolking, Zaho, L'Algérino	Apollo Films	
J U L Y	26	Summer Frost ⌀	Un Hiver en Été	Laetitia Masson	Benjamin Biolay, Élodie Bouchez, Judith Chemla, Nicolas Duvauchelle, Hélène Fillières, Cédric Kahn, Laurent Stocker, Clémence Poésy, Nora Hamzawi, Pablo Pauly	Jour2Fête	
J U L Y	26	The Cow Who Sang a Song Into the Future ⌀‡	La Vaca Que Cantó una Canción Hacia el Futuro	Francisca Alegría	Mía Maestro, Leonor Varela, Alfredo Castro	Nour Films	
J U L Y	26	The Damned Don't Cry ⌀‡	Les Damnés Ne Pleurent Pas	Fyzal Boulifa	Aïcha Tebbae, Abdellah El Hajjouji, Antoine Reinartz	New Story Films	
A U G U S T	2	The Hummingbird ⌀‡	Il Colibrì	Francesca Archibugi	Pierfrancesco Favino, Kasia Smutniak, Bérénice Bejo, Nanni Moretti, Laura Morante, Valeria Cavalli	Paname Distribution	
A U G U S T	2	Toto 2	Les Blagues de Toto 2: Classe Verte	Pascal Bourdiaux	Valérie Karsenti, Pauline Clément, Guillaume de Tonquédec, Anne Marivin	SND	
A U G U S T	2	Tropic	Tropic	Édouard Salier	Pablo Cobo, Marta Nieto	Rezo Films	
A U G U S T	2	Wild Flowers ⌀‡	Girasoles Silvestres	Jaime Rosales	Anna Castillo, Oriol Pla, Quim Àvila, Lluís Marquès, Manolo Solo, Carolina Yuste, Diana Gómez	Condor Entertainment	
A U G U S T	2	Yamabuki ⌀‡	山吹	Yamasaki Juichiro	Kirara Inori, Yohta Kawase, Misa Wada	Survivance Films	
A U G U S T	2	Yannick	Yannick	Quentin Dupieux	Raphaël Quenard, Blanche Gardin, Pio Marmaï, Sébastien Chassagne	Diaphana Distribution	
A U G U S T	9	Advantages of Travelling by Train ⌀‡	Ventajas de Viajar en Tren	Aritz Moreno	Luis Tosar, Pilar Castro, Ernesto Alterio, Quim Gutiérrez, Belén Cuesta, Macarena García, Javier Godino, Stéphanie Magnin, Gilbert Melki, Javier Botet	Damned Distribution	
A U G U S T	9	Animalia	Animalia	Sofia Alaoui	Oumaïma Barid, Mehdi Dehbi, Fouad Oughaou	Ad Vitam Distribution	
A U G U S T	9	Paint It Gold	Un Coup de Maître	Rémi Bezançon	Vincent Macaigne, Bouli Lanners, Bastien Ughetto, Aure Atika	Zinc Film	
A U G U S T	9	Promises ⌀‡	Promises	Amanda Sthers	Pierfrancesco Favino, Kelly Reilly, Jean Reno, Cara Theobold, Kris Marshall, Deepak Verma, Marie Mouté	Madeleine Films	
A U G U S T	9	The Madness Express	Veuillez Nous Excuser pour la Gêne Occasionnée	Olivier Van Hoofstadt	Artus, Elsa Zylberstein, Benjamin Tranié	UGC	
A U G U S T	9	The Path of Excellence	La Voie Royale	Frédéric Mermoud	Suzanne Jouannet, Marie Colomb, Maud Wyler, Marilyne Canto	Pyramide Films	
A U G U S T	16	Never Too Late for Love ⌀‡	Astolfo	Gianni Di Gregorio	Gianni Di Gregorio, Stefania Sandrelli, Agnese Nano	Le Pacte	
A U G U S T	16	The Beast in the Jungle	La Bête dans la Jungle	Patric Chiha	Anaïs Demoustier, Tom Mercier, Béatrice Dalle	Les Films du Losange	
A U G U S T	16	The Jungle Bunch: World Tour	Les As de la Jungle 2: Opération Tour du Monde	Laurent Bru, Yannick Moulin & Benoit Somville	Philippe Bozo, Laurent Morteau, Pascal Casanova	SND	
A U G U S T	16	When the Waves Are Gone ⌀‡	Kapag Wala Nang Mga Alon	Lav Diaz	John Lloyd Cruz, Ronnie Lazaro, Shamaine Buencamino	Epicentre Films	
A U G U S T	23	Anatomy of a Fall	Anatomie d'une chute	Justine Triet	Sandra Hüller, Swann Arlaud, Milo Machado-Graner, Antoine Reinartz, Samuel Theis, Jehnny Beth	Le Pacte	
A U G U S T	23	Ghosts ⌀‡	Hayaletler	Azra Deniz Okyay	Dilayda Güneş, Beril Kayar, Nalan Kuruçim	La Vingt-Cinquième Heure	
A U G U S T	23	Retribution ‡	Retribution	Nimród Antal	Liam Neeson, Noma Dumezweni, Lilly Aspell, Jack Champion, Embeth Davidtz, Matthew Modine, Arian Moayed	StudioCanal	
A U G U S T	25	The Squad: Home Run †	Antigang: La Relève	Benjamin Rocher	Alban Lenoir, Cassiopée Mayance, Sofia Essaïdi, Jean Reno, Stéfi Celma	Disney+	
A U G U S T	30	Alam ⌀‡	Alam	Firas Khoury	Mohammad Karaki, Sereen Khass, Mahmood Bakri	JHR Films	
A U G U S T	30	Àma Gloria	Àma Gloria	Marie Amachoukeli	Louise Mauroy-Panzani, Ilça Moreno, Arnaud Rebotini	Pyramide Films	
A U G U S T	30	Banel & Adama ‡	Banel & Adama	Ramata-Toulaye Sy	Khady Mane, Mamadou Diallo, Binta Racine Sy	Tandem Films	
A U G U S T	30	Small, Slow but Steady ⌀‡	ケイコ 目を澄ませて	Sho Miyake	Yukino Kishii, Tomokazu Miura, Masaki Miura	Art House Films	
A U G U S T	30	Super Drunk	Super-bourrés	Bastien Milheau	Barbara Schulz, Vincent Moscato	Zinc Film	
A U G U S T	30	The She-Wolf ⌀‡	La Lupa	Manon Décor & Michele Salimbeni	Jessica Mazzoli, Pierre-Yves Massip	Saint-André-des-Arts	
S E P T E M B E R	6	Anti-Squat	Anti-Squat	Nicolas Silhol	Louise Bourgoin	Diaphana Distribution	
S E P T E M B E R	6	The Temple Woods Gang ⌀	Le Gang des Bois du Temple	Rabah Ameur-Zaïmeche	Régis Laroche, Philippe Petit, Marie Loustalot	Les Alchimistes Films	
S E P T E M B E R	6	Toni	Toni, En Famille	Nathan Ambrosioni	Camille Cottin, Léa Lopez, Louise Labèque	StudioCanal	
S E P T E M B E R	6	Visions	Visions	Yann Gozlan	Diane Kruger, Mathieu Kassovitz, Marta Nieto	SND	
S E P T E M B E R	8	Sentinelle †	Sentinelle	Hugo Benamozig & David Caviglioli	Jonathan Cohen, Emmanuelle Bercot, Raphaël Quenard, Gustave Kervern, Ramzy Bedia	Amazon Prime Video	
S E P T E M B E R	13	A Real Job	Un Métier Sérieux	Thomas Lilti	Vincent Lacoste, François Cluzet, Louise Bourgoin, Adèle Exarchopoulos, William Lebghil, Lucie Zhang, Bouli Lanners	Le Pacte	
S E P T E M B E R	13	Daughter of Rage	La Hija de Todas las Rabias	Laura Baumeister de Montis	Ara Alejandra Medal, Virginia Raquel Sevilla García, Noé Hernández	Tamasa Distribution	
S E P T E M B E R	13	Last Summer	L'Été Dernier	Catherine Breillat	Léa Drucker, Olivier Rabourdin, Clotilde Courau	Pyramide Films	
S E P T E M B E R	13	Les Secrets de la Princesse de Cadignan	Les Secrets de la Princesse de Cadignan	Arielle Dombasle	Arielle Dombasle, Julie Depardieu, Cédric Kahn, Michel Fau, Stanislas Merhar, Hippolyte Girardot, Olivier Py, Alexandra Stewart, Théo Cholbi, Andy Gillet	ARP Sélection	
S E P T E M B E R	13	The Book of Solutions	Le Livre des Solutions	Michel Gondry	Pierre Niney, Blanche Gardin, Françoise Lebrun, Vincent Elbaz	The Jokers Films	
S E P T E M B E R	13	The Plough	Le Grand Chariot	Philippe Garrel	Louis Garrel, Damien Mongin, Esther Garrel, Léna Garrel, Aurélien Recoing, Francine Bergé, Asma Messaoudene	Ad Vitam Distribution	
S E P T E M B E R	20	Acid	Acide	Just Philippot	Guillaume Canet, Laetitia Dosch	Pathé	
S E P T E M B E R	20	Comme une Louve	Comme une Louve	Caroline Glorion	Mathilde La Musse, Sandrine Bonnaire, Sarah Suco, François Morel, Laurence Côte	Alba Films	
S E P T E M B E R	20	Deserts ‡	Déserts	Faouzi Bensaïdi	Fehd Benchemsi, Abdelhadi Talbi, Rabii Benjhaile	Dulac Distribution	
S E P T E M B E R	20	Inside the Yellow Cocoon Shell ‡	Bên Trong Vỏ Kén Vàng	Phạm Thiên Ân	Lê Phong Vũ, Nguyễn Thị Trúc Quỳnh, Vũ Ngọc Mạnh	Nour Films	
S E P T E M B E R	20	La Petite	La Petite	Guillaume Nicloux	Fabrice Luchini, Mara Taquin, Maud Wyler	SND	
S E P T E M B E R	20	Madness	Follia	Charles Guérin Surville	Stefano Cassetti, Manal Issa, Daniil Vorobyov	Beabia Films	
S E P T E M B E R	20	Mise au Vert	Mise au Vert	Yohann Charrin	Frederick Guillaud, Alexandra Holzhammer, Juliette Charrin	KapFilms	
S E P T E M B E R	27	Club Zero ‡	Club Zero	Jessica Hausner	Mia Wasikowska, Mathieu Demy, Elsa Zylberstein, Amir El-Masry, Sidse Babett Knudsen	BAC Films	
S E P T E M B E R	27	Coup de Chance	Coup de Chance	Woody Allen	Lou de Laâge, Valérie Lemercier, Melvil Poupaud, Niels Schneider, Elsa Zylberstein, Grégory Gadebois, Guillaume de Tonquédec, Sara Martins, William Nadylam, Bárbara Goenaga	Metropolitan Filmexport	
S E P T E M B E R	27	Do Not Expect Too Much from the End of the World ‡	Nu Astepta Prea Mult de la Sfârsitul Lumii	Radu Jude	Ilinca Manolache, Nina Hoss, Uwe Boll	Météore Films	
S E P T E M B E R	27	Dogman ‡	Dogman	Luc Besson	Caleb Landry Jones, Marisa Berenson	Apollo Films	
S E P T E M B E R	27	Nouveau Départ	Nouveau Départ	Philippe Lefebvre	Franck Dubosc, Karin Viard	UGC	
S E P T E M B E R	27	Poisson Rouge	Poisson Rouge	Hugo Bachelet, Clément Vallos & Matthieu Yakovleff	Guillaume Darnault, Julie Gallibert, Andy Pimor, Fabien Strobel, Denis Lavant, Thomas VDB, Steve Tran, Clémence Bretécher	Apollo Films	
S E P T E M B E R	27	Street Flow 2 †	Banlieusards 2	Leïla Sy & Kery James	Kery James, Jammeh Diangana, Bakary Diombera	Netflix	
S E P T E M B E R	27	The Goldman Case	Le Procès Goldman	Cédric Kahn	Arieh Worthalter, Arthur Harari, Stéphan Guérin-Tillié, Jerzy Radziwiłowicz, Laetitia Masson, François Favrat	Ad Vitam Distribution	

== October–December ==
⌀ Denotes a film that was publicly screened prior to 2023, be it through film festivals, premieres or releases in other countries
† Denotes a film released through a streaming service, not theatrically
‡ Denotes a film primarily not in the French language

Opening		English Title	Native Title	Director	Cast	Studio	Ref.
O C T O B E R	4	Bernadette	Bernadette	Léa Doménach	Catherine Deneuve, Michel Vuillermoz, Denis Podalydès, Sara Giraudeau, Artus	Warner Bros. Pictures	
O C T O B E R	4	Negative Numbers ⌀‡	უარყოფითი რიცხვები	Uta Beria	Sandro Kalandadze, Viktor Barbakadze, Tedo Bekhauri	Wide Distribution	
O C T O B E R	4	The Animal Kingdom	Le Règne Animal	Thomas Cailley	Romain Duris, Adèle Exarchopoulos, Paul Kircher	StudioCanal	
O C T O B E R	4	The Other Laurens	L'Autre Laurens	Claude Schmitz	Olivier Rabourdin, Louise Leroy, Marc Barbé	Arizona Distribution	
O C T O B E R	4	You Promised Me the Sea	L'Air de la Mer Rend Libre	Nadir Moknèche	Youssouf Abi-Ayad, Kenza Fortas, Saadia Bentaïeb, Zinedine Soualem, Lubna Azabal, Zahia Dehar, Karina Testa	Pyramide Films	
O C T O B E R	11	Bad Living ‡	Mal Viver	João Canijo	Anabela Moreira, Rita Blanco, Madalena Almeida, Cleia Almeida, Nuno Lopes, Filipa Areosa, Leonor Silveira, Rafael Morais, Beatriz Batarda	UFO Distribution	
O C T O B E R	11	Defend Your Name	Garder Ton Nom	Vincent Duquesne	Nicolas Fustier, Pablo Pauly, Julia Piaton, Patrick Rocca	StudioCanal	
O C T O B E R	11	Living Bad ‡	Viver Mal	João Canijo	Nuno Lopes, Filipa Areosa, Leonor Silveira, Rafael Morais, Beatriz Batarda, Anabela Moreira, Rita Blanco, Madalena Almeida, Cleia Almeida	UFO Distribution	
O C T O B E R	11	Consent	Le Consentement	Vanessa Filho	Kim Higelin, Jean-Paul Rouve, Laetitia Casta, Sara Giraudeau, Élodie Bouchez	Pan-Européenne	
O C T O B E R	11	Lost Country ‡	Изгубљена Земља	Vladimir Perišić	Jasna Đuričić, Boris Isaković, Marija Škaričić, Pavle Čemerikić, Helena Buljan, Goran Navojec	Rezo Films	
O C T O B E R	11	Nina and the Hedgehog's Secret	Nina et le Secret du Hérisson	Alain Gagnol & Jean-Loup Felicioli	Audrey Tautou, Guillaume Canet, Guillaume Bats, Patrick Ridremont	Les Films du Losange	
O C T O B E R	11	Take a Chance on Me	Marie-Line et Son Juge	Jean-Pierre Améris	Louane Emera, Michel Blanc, Victor Belmondo, Philippe Rebbot	ARP Sélection	
O C T O B E R	11	The Jolly Forgers	La Fiancée du Poète	Yolande Moreau	Yolande Moreau, Sergi López, Grégory Gadebois, Estéban	Le Pacte	
O C T O B E R	11	The Rapture	Le Ravissement	Iris Kaltenbäck	Hafsia Herzi, Alexis Manenti, Nina Meurisse	Diaphana Distribution	
O C T O B E R	18	A Prince	Un Prince	Pierre Creton	Antoine Pirotte, Pierre Creton, Manon Schaap, Vincent Barré	JHR Films	
O C T O B E R	18	A Difficult Year	Une Année Difficile	Éric Toledano and Olivier Nakache	Pio Marmaï, Jonathan Cohen, Noémie Merlant, Mathieu Amalric, Grégoire Leprince-Ringuet, Luàna Bajrami	Gaumont	
O C T O B E R	18	Chicken for Linda!	Linda Veut du Poulet!	Chiara Malta & Sébastien Laudenbach	Mélinée Leclerc, Clotilde Hesme, Laetitia Dosch, Estéban, Patrick Pineau	Gebeka Films	
O C T O B E R	18	In the Company of Women ‡	Las Buenas Compañías	Sílvia Munt	Alícia Falcó, Elena Tarrats, Itziar Ituño, Ainhoa Santamaría, María Cerezuela, Iván Massagué	Damned Distribution	
O C T O B E R	18	Woman on the Roof ⌀‡	Kobieta na Dachu	Anna Jadowska	Dorota Pomykała, Bogdan Koca, Adam Bobik	La Vingt-Cinquième Heure	
O C T O B E R	25	Only 3 Days Left	3 Jours Max	Tarek Boudali	Tarek Boudali, Philippe Lacheau, Julien Arruti, Vanessa Guide, José Garcia, Marie-Anne Chazel, Reem Kherici, Nicolas Marié, Chantal Ladesou	StudioCanal	
O C T O B E R	25	Second Round	Second Tour	Albert Dupontel	Albert Dupontel, Cécile de France, Nicolas Marié	Pathé	
O C T O B E R	25	The (Ex)perience of Love	Le Syndrome des amours passées	Ann Sirot and Raphaël Balboni	Lucie Debay, Lazare Gousseau, Florence Loiret Caille, Nora Hamzawi	KMBO Films	
O C T O B E R	25	The Old Oak ‡	The Old Oak	Ken Loach	Dave Turner, Ebla Mari, Claire Rodgerson	Le Pacte	
O C T O B E R	25	The Pod Generation ‡	The Pod Generation	Sophie Barthes	Emilia Clarke, Chiwetel Ejiofor, Rosalie Craig, Vinette Robinson, Jean-Marc Barr, Kathryn Hunter	Jour2Fête	
O C T O B E R	25	The Vourdalak	Le Vourdalak	Adrien Beau	Kacey Mottet Klein, Ariane Labed, Grégoire Colin	The Jokers Films	
N O V E M B E R	1	Flo	Flo	Géraldine Danon	Stéphane Caillard, Alexis Michalik, Alison Wheeler, Pierre Deladonchamps, Charles Berling, Samuel Jouy, Marilyne Canto, Didier Bourdon	Metropolitan Filmexport	
N O V E M B E R	1	Inestimable	Inestimable	Éric Fraticelli	Éric Fraticelli, Didier Bourdon, Philippe Corti, Michel Vuillermoz, Michel Ferracci	Pan-Européenne	
N O V E M B E R	1	Kidnapped ‡	Rapito	Marco Bellocchio	Paolo Pierobon, Fausto Russo Alesi, Barbara Ronchi	Ad Vitam Distribution	
N O V E M B E R	1	Marguerite's Theorem	Le Théorème de Marguerite	Anna Novion	Ella Rumpf, Jean-Pierre Darroussin, Clotilde Courau, Julien Frison	Pyramide Films	
N O V E M B E R	1	Mr. Blake at Your Service!	Complètement Cramé!	Gilles Legardinier	John Malkovich, Fanny Ardant, Philippe Bas, Émilie Dequenne	Universal Pictures	
N O V E M B E R	1	Take Me Home	Monsieur le Maire	Karine Blanc & Michel Tavares	Clovis Cornillac, Eye Haïdara, Laurence Côte, Jean-Pierre Martins, Sophie Guillemin	UGC	
N O V E M B E R	1	Wingwomen †	Voleuses	Mélanie Laurent	Mélanie Laurent, Adèle Exarchopoulos, Manon Bresch, Isabelle Adjani, Félix Moati, Philippe Katerine	Netflix	
N O V E M B E R	8	Abbé Pierre – A Century of Devotion	L'Abbé Pierre - Une Vie de Combats	Frédéric Tellier	Benjamin Lavernhe, Emmanuelle Bercot, Michel Vuillermoz	SND	
N O V E M B E R	8	The Nature of Love	Simple Comme Sylvain	Monia Chokri	Magalie Lépine-Blondeau, Pierre-Yves Cardinal	Memento Distribution	
N O V E M B E R	8	The Taste of Things	La Passion de Dodin Bouffant	Tran Anh Hung	Juliette Binoche, Benoît Magimel	Gaumont	
N O V E M B E R	15	After the Fire	Avant Que les Flammes Ne S'Éteignent	Mehdi Fikri	Camélia Jordana, Sofiane Zermani, Sofian Khammes, Sonia Faidi, Louise Coldefy, Makita Samba, Hammou Graïa, Samir Guesmi, Larry	BAC Films	
N O V E M B E R	15	And the Party Goes On	Et la Fête Continue!	Robert Guédiguian	Ariane Ascaride, Jean-Pierre Darroussin, Gérard Meylan, Lola Naymark, Robinson Stévenin, Grégoire Leprince-Ringuet	Diaphana Distribution	
N O V E M B E R	15	Instant Family	Comme par Magie	Christophe Barratier	Kev Adams, Gérard Jugnot, Claire Chust	Apollo Films	
N O V E M B E R	15	Little Girl Blue	Little Girl Blue	Mona Achache	Marion Cotillard, Mona Achache, Marie Bunel, Didier Flamand	Tandem Films	
N O V E M B E R	15	Once Upon a Time in Algeria	Le Petit Blond de la Casbah	Alexandre Arcady	Léo Campion, Marie Gillain, Christian Berkel, Jean Benguigui, Dany Brillant, Pascal Elbé, Judith El Zein, Michel Boujenah, Patrick Mille, Valérie Kaprisky, Françoise Fabian, Franck Dubosc, Smaïn, Moussa Maaskri, Rona Hartner, Olivier Sitruk, Iman Perez, Matthias Van Khache, Tom Hygreck, Abbes Zahmani, Jean-Claude de Goros	StudioCanal	
N O V E M B E R	15	The Deep Dark	Gueules Noires	Mathieu Turi	Samuel Le Bihan, Amir El Kacem, Jean-Hugues Anglade, Thomas Solivérès, Bruno Sanches, Diego Martín, Marc Riso, Philippe Torreton	Alba Films	
N O V E M B E R	15	Vincent Must Die	Vincent Doit Mourir	Stéphan Castang	Karim Leklou, Vimala Pons	Capricci Films	
N O V E M B E R	22	Le Monde d'Après 3	Le Monde d'Après 3	Laurent Firode	Louisa Lacroix, Elise Lissague, Christian Diaz	Bon Voyage Films	
N O V E M B E R	22	Mars Express	Mars Express	Jérémie Périn	Léa Drucker, Daniel Njo Lobé, Mathieu Amalric	Gebeka Films	
N O V E M B E R	22	All to Play For	Rien à Perdre	Delphine Deloget	Virginie Efira, Félix Lefebvre, Arieh Worthalter, Mathieu Demy	Ad Vitam Distribution	
N O V E M B E R	22	Spirit of Ecstasy	La Vénus d'Argent	Héléna Klotz	Claire Pommet, Niels Schneider, Sofiane Zermani, Anna Mouglalis, Grégoire Colin, Mathieu Amalric	Pyramide Films	
N O V E M B E R	22	Under the Rainbow	L'Arche de Noé	Bryan Marciano	Valérie Lemercier, Finnegan Oldfield, Fehdi Bendjima	UGC	
N O V E M B E R	22	We Can Be Heroes	Je Ne Suis Pas un Héros	Rudy Milstein	Vincent Dedienne, Géraldine Nakache, Clémence Poésy, Isabelle Nanty, Sam Karmann, Anna Cervinka	Paname Distribution	
N O V E M B E R	29	Along Came Love	Le Temps d'Aimer	Katell Quillévéré	Anaïs Demoustier, Vincent Lacoste	Gaumont	
N O V E M B E R	29	She Is Conann	Conann	Bertrand Mandico	Elina Löwensohn, Christa Théret, Françoise Brion, Nathalie Richard, Agata Buzek, Karoline Rose SUN	UFO Distribution	
N O V E M B E R	29	The Braid ‡	La Tresse	Laetitia Colombani	Kim Raver, Fotinì Peluso	SND	
D E C E M B E R	6	Christmas Unplanned	Noël Joyeux	Clément Michel	Franck Dubosc, Emmanuelle Devos, Danièle Lebrun, Danielle Fichaud, Jean-François Cayrey	Gaumont	
D E C E M B E R	6	L'Enfant du Paradis	L'Enfant du Paradis	Salim Kechiouche	Salim Kechiouche, Nora Arnezeder, Hassan Alili, Naidra Ayadi, Kevin Mischel, Pascale Arbillot, Zinedine Soualem, Carima Amarouche, Vincent Lecœur	La Vingt-Cinquième Heure	
D E C E M B E R	6	La Chimera ‡	La Chimera	Alice Rohrwacher	Josh O'Connor, Carol Duarte, Vincenzo Nemolato, Alba Rohrwacher, Isabella Rossellini, Lou Roy-Lecollinet	Ad Vitam Distribution	
D E C E M B E R	6	Les Indésirables	Bâtiment 5	Ladj Ly	Alexis Manenti, Jeanne Balibar, Steve Tientcheu	Le Pacte	
D E C E M B E R	6	Paris Lost & Found	Paris Lost & Found	Kartik Singh	Sean Cackoski, Corneliu Dragomirescu, Azuki Hagino	Saint-André-des-Arts	
D E C E M B E R	6	Power Alley ‡	Levante	Lillah Halla	Ayomi Domenica Dias, Loro Bardot, Grace Passô	Rezo Films	
D E C E M B E R	6	Soudain Seuls	Soudain Seuls	Thomas Bidegain	Gilles Lellouche, Mélanie Thierry	StudioCanal	
D E C E M B E R	7	Nonm	Nonm	Daniel Kichenassamy	Youri Lauriette, Marvin Rénac, Méthi’s	Prémices Art Studio	
D E C E M B E R	8	Dealing with Christmas †	Un Stupéfiant Noël!	Arthur Sanigou	Éric Judor, Matthias Quiviger, Lison Daniel, Alex Lutz, Jonas Dinal, Kim Higelin, Catherine Hosmalin, François Vincentelli, Jean-Yves Tual, Monsieur Poulpe, Nicky Marbot, Bruno Sanches, Guy Lecluyse, Philippe Lacheau, Laura Felpin	Amazon Prime Video	
D E C E M B E R	13	Légua ‡	Légua	João Miller Guerra & Filipa Reis	Carla Maciel, Fátima Soares, Vitória Nogueira da Silva	Norte Distribution	
D E C E M B E R	13	Parisian Hustle ⌀	Rue des Dames	Hamé & Ekoué	Garance Marillier, Sandor Funtek	The Jokers Films	
D E C E M B E R	13	Shttl ⌀‡	Shttl	Ady Walter	Moshe Lobel, Saul Rubinek	Urban Distribution	
D E C E M B E R	13	Sirocco and the Kingdom of the Winds	Sirocco et le Royaume des Courants d'Air	Benoît Chieux	Loïse Charpentier, Maryne Bertieaux, Aurélie Konaté	Haut et Court	
D E C E M B E R	13	The Inseparables ‡	The Inseparables	Jérémie Degruson	Dakota West, Jordan Baird	KMBO Films	
D E C E M B E R	13	The Three Musketeers: Milady	Les Trois Mousquetaires: Milady	Martin Bourboulon	François Civil, Vincent Cassel, Romain Duris, Pio Marmaï, Eva Green, Lyna Khoudri, Louis Garrel, Vicky Krieps, Jacob Fortune-Lloyd, Alexis Michalik	Pathé	
D E C E M B E R	20	Jeff & Jean-Marc's Adventures	À la Poursuite de Jean-Marc	Pierre-François Martin-Laval	Jeff Panacloc, Nicolas Marié	SND	
D E C E M B E R	20	My Own France	Ma France à Moi	Benoît Cohen	Fanny Ardant, Nawid Elham, Élisabeth Margoni, Suzy Bemba, Pierre Deladonchamps, Aurore Broutin, Lionel Abelanski	Pan-Européenne	
D E C E M B E R	20	No Love Lost	La Fille de son Père	Erwan Le Duc	Nahuel Pérez Biscayart, Céleste Brunnquell, Maud Wyler, Céleste Brunnquell, Camille Rutherford	Pyramide Films	
D E C E M B E R	20	Open Season	Chasse Gardée	Frédéric Forestier & Antonin Fourlon	Didier Bourdon, Hakim Jemili, Camille Lou, Thierry Lhermitte, Jean-François Cayrey, Julien Pestel, Chantal Ladesou, André Penvern, Isabelle Candelier-Parnes	UGC	
D E C E M B E R	20	The Settlers ‡	Los Colonos	Felipe Gálvez Haberle	Sam Spruell, Alfredo Castro, Mariano Llinás, Marcelo Alonso	Dulac Distribution	
D E C E M B E R	27	5 Hectares	5 Hectares	Émilie Deleuze	Lambert Wilson, Marina Hands, Laurent Poitrenaux	Paname Distribution	
D E C E M B E R	27	Kina & Yuk	Kina & Yuk: Renards de la Banquise	Guillaume Maidatchevsky	Virginie Efira	UGC	
D E C E M B E R	27	Les SEGPA au Ski	Les SEGPA au Ski	Ali Bougheraba & Hakim Bougheraba	Ichem Bougheraba, Walid Ben Amar, Arriles Amrani	Apollo Films	
D E C E M B E R	27	Robot Dreams	Robot Dreams	Pablo Berger		Wild Bunch	
D E C E M B E R	27	The Edge of the Blade	Une Affaire d'Honneur	Vincent Perez	Roschdy Zem, Doria Tillier, Guillaume Gallienne, Damien Bonnard, Vincent Perez, Myriem Akheddiou	Gaumont	
D E C E M B E R	27	Infested	Vermines	Sébastien Vaniček	Théo Christine, Sofia Lesaffre, Jérôme Niel, Lisa Nyarko, Finnegan Oldfield	Tandem Films	
