= Open Season (2023 film) =

- Theatrical release poster
- Chasse gardée
- Directed by: Frédéric Forestier; Antonin Fourlon
- Written by: Antonin Fourlon
- Starring: Didier Bourdon; Thierry Lhermitte
- Distributed by: UGC
- Release date: 2023
- Running time: 101 min
- Countries: France; Belgium
- Language: French

Open Season (French: Chasse gardée) is a 2023 Franco-Belgian comedy film directed by Antonin Fourlon and Frédéric Forestier, released in 2023. It was a box office success in France. Open Season addresses the topic of culture shock, experienced by a Parisian couple moving to a village with a strong community of hunters.

== Plot ==
Simon and Adélaïde are tired of the city life and leave their Parisian flat with their two children to live in a large country house on the edge of a forest in the village of Saint Hubert des Bois. They befriend their neighbours, Bernard and Michel. But, as September comes, their garden and the adjacent woods are used as a hunting ground. Hostilities are declared between the family and the hunting group (including Bernard, their leader, and Michel). After various unfruitful attempts, Simon and Adélaïde are discouraged and decide to go back to Paris. However, their departure causes the closing of the village school, whose headmistress is Bernard's wife, so that the latter insists on having the couple and their children go back to Saint Hubert des Bois.

== Cast ==
- Hakim Jemili: Simon
- Camille Lou: Adélaïde
- Didier Bourdon: Bernard
- Jean-François Cayrey: Michel
- Julien Pestel: Benjamin
- André Penvern: André
- Isabelle Candelier: Olivia, Bernard's wife
- Thierry Lhermitte: Gaspard, Adélaïde's father and lawyer
- Chantal Ladesou: local real estate agent
- Théo Gross: Mayor
- Guillaume Bouchède : the butcher
- David Salles: Denis, new buyer of the house and hunter

== Production ==
According to the film credits, Open Season was filmed in and around Compiègne, in Vieux Moulin and Pierrefonds, in the department of Oise. Some scenes were shot in Aisne.

== Box office ==
In February 2024, at the end of its seventh weekend of release, the film became the sixth French film to enter the top 20 of the French box office for films released in 2023, exceeding 1,778,000 admissions.

== Critical response ==
Le Point mildly praised some of the cast's performances but criticised the plot. Télérama found it was an unpredictable film, that was moderately critical of hunting practices, unlike an older notorious comedic piece on the subject by Bourdon with Les Inconnus. The film was widely described as a "box office surprise".

A French reviewer commented, "Let's be clear, in terms of writing, the film is extremely basic but by not taking itself seriously and letting things go, Chasse gardée makes us laugh in a few unexpected flashes of lightness. The best example will remain the chaotic sequence of the banquet, when Simon, Adelaide and her lawyer father, see their attempt at intimidation transformed into an evening of frank camaraderie, with a lot of wine drinking, roasted pork and a frenzied farandole to the music of Patrick Sébastien."
