= The Three Musketeers: D'Artagnan =

2023 film by Martin Bourboulon

- Theatrical release poster
- French: Les Trois Mousquetaires: D'Artagnan
- Directed by: Martin Bourboulon
- Written by: Matthieu Delaporte; Alexandre de La Patellière
- Based on: The Three Musketeers by Alexandre Dumas
- Produced by: Dimitri Rassam
- Starring: François Civil; Vincent Cassel; Romain Duris; Pio Marmaï; Eva Green
- Cinematography: Nicolas Bolduc
- Edited by: Célia Lafitedupont
- Music by: Guillaume Roussel
- Production companies: Pathé; Chapter 2; M6 Films; Constantin Film; DeAPlaneta; Umedia
- Distributed by: Pathé Distribution (France); Alternative Films (Belgium); Constantin Film (Germany); DeAPlaneta (Spain)
- Release dates: 5 April 2023 (France & Belgium); 13 April 2023 (Germany); 14 April 2023 (Spain)
- Running time: 121 minutes
- Countries: France; Germany; Spain; Belgium
- Language: French
- Budget: €36 million; (US$39.1 million)
- Box office: $35 million

The Three Musketeers: D'Artagnan (French: Les Trois Mousquetaires : D'Artagnan, titled The Three Musketeers – Part I: D'Artagnan in the United States) is a 2023 epic action-adventure film and the first of a two-part epic saga directed by Martin Bourboulon, based on Alexandre Dumas's 1844 novel. The film stars François Civil, Vincent Cassel, Romain Duris, Pio Marmaï, Eva Green and Louis Garrel.

It was released theatrically in France by Pathé Distribution on 5 April 2023. The second part, The Three Musketeers: Milady, was released on 13 December 2023. The films were co-produced by France, Germany, Spain and Belgium on a combined production budget of €72 million (US$78 million), around €36 million for each film, the second most expensive French production of 2023, and filmed back to back for 150 days from 16 August 2021 to 3 June 2022.

The film received generally positive reviews from critics and was a box office hit in France, becoming the third highest-grossing French film of 2023, the fifth highest-grossing French film internationally and the eighth highest-grossing film of 2023 in France, with over 3.4 million tickets sold in the country and over 1.6 million tickets sold outside France. It received six nominations at the 49th César Awards.

== Plot ==
On his way to Paris to join the Musketeers of the Guard, D'Artagnan, a young man from Gascony, is almost killed trying to stop a young noblewoman from being kidnapped by a group of armed men. In Paris, D'Artagnan visits Capitaine de Tréville, the commander of the musketeers, at its headquarters. Tréville, who knew D'Artagnan's late father, encourages him to start a military career as a cadet. Through a window, D'Artagnan sees one of the men who tried to kill him days earlier. As D'Artagnan rushes out of the building to confront him, he unintentionally offends—on three occasions—three musketeers: Athos, Porthos and Aramis, who demand satisfaction. D'Artagnan schedules a duel with each of them the same day.

As D'Artagnan prepares himself for the first duel, he realizes that Athos's seconds are Porthos and Aramis, who are astonished that the young Gascon intends to duel them all. As D'Artagnan and Athos begin the duel, Cardinal Richelieu's guards appear and attempt to arrest the musketeers and the Gascon for illegally dueling. Although they are vastly outnumbered, the four men win the battle. Although proud of his guards' victory over Cardinal's guards, King Louis XIII nevertheless upbraids the musketeers and warns them the next man caught dueling will be sent to the dungeon.

D'Artagnan becomes friends with the Three Musketeers. He discovers that Porthos is bisexual. He finds lodgings and falls in love at first sight with Constance Bonacieux, a sentiment which she eventually comes to reciprocate. She works for Queen Anne of France, King Louis' wife, who is secretly in love with the Englishman Duke of Buckingham. Cardinal Richelieu plots to demonstrate that Queen Anne is cheating on her husband, which would lead, according to Richelieu's plan, to her beheading.

The king's military and clerical advisers and his younger brother Gaston (Louis' heir presumptive and political rival) urge the king to fight Protestant rebels at their stronghold of La Rochelle. King Louis, conscious of the history of religious wars under his predecessors, refuses to authorize a war.

An unknown young woman is found dead and naked, with multiple stab wounds, in bed with Athos. Athos is falsely accused of murder and is sentenced to death by the King's court. D'Artagnan realizes it was the same young woman he tried to save from being kidnapped on his way to Paris. Seeing a chance to save Athos, the musketeers resolve to learn her identity. D'Artagnan goes to the House of Valcour to talk to a family they believe is connected to the woman. While there, he meets Milady who pretends to be a member of the Valcour family. When D'Artagnan recognizes that she is an impostor, Milady attempts to kill him, but D'Artagnan eludes her.

Athos is freed on the way to his execution by his younger brother, Benjamin, who is in hiding with his allies, leaders of Protestant rebels, Saint-Blancard and Brandicourt.

The king gives the queen a gift of diamonds, but she gives them to Lord Buckingham as a keepsake. The king hears rumors of the affair and demands that the queen wear the diamonds to his brother's wedding. Constance sends D'Artagnan to England to retrieve the diamonds from Buckingham. Milady, an agent of Cardinal Richelieu, steals the diamonds from Buckingham, but D'Artagnan chases after her and retrieves them. Milady jumps off a cliff to escape. D'Artagnan returns the jewels to Queen Anne just in time to save her honor.

At the wedding of Gaston, Duke of Orléans and Marie de Bourbon, Duchess of Montpensier, the Gaston-aligned plotters within the top ranks of French military join forces with the Protestant rebels, including Athos' brother, to try to assassinate the king, but Athos and the rest of the musketeers save him. The king pardons Athos and appoints D'Artagnan a lieutenant in the Musketeers.

At the film's ending, D'Artagnan is knocked unconscious in a dark street by one of the plotters' henchmen while trying to save Constance from being kidnapped.

In a mid-credits scene, Milady is seen speaking with Cardinal Richelieu. She mentions the problems the musketeers caused to her mission.

== Cast ==
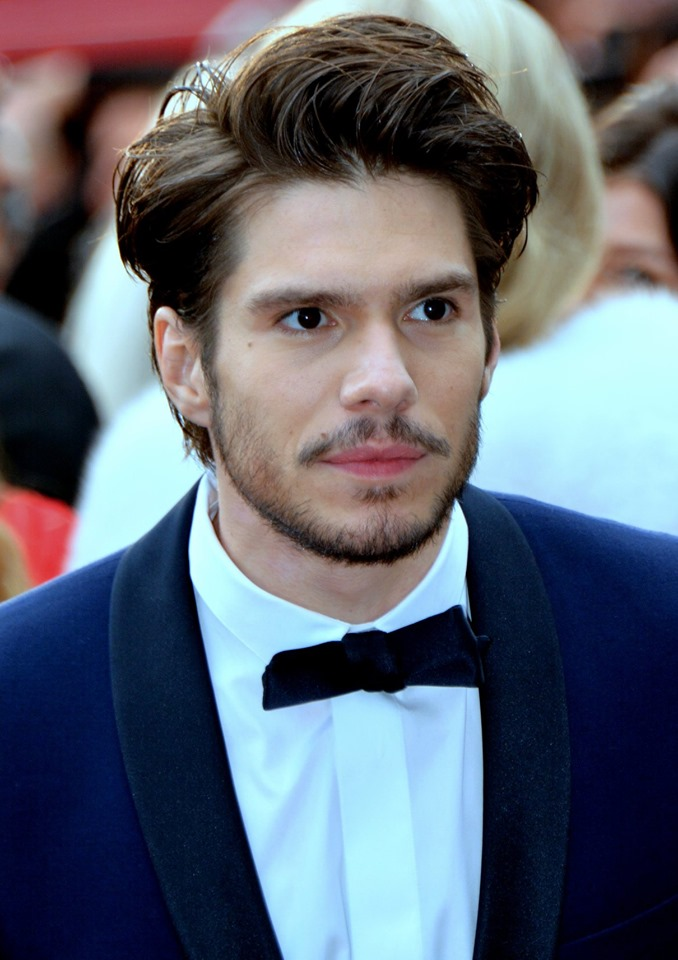
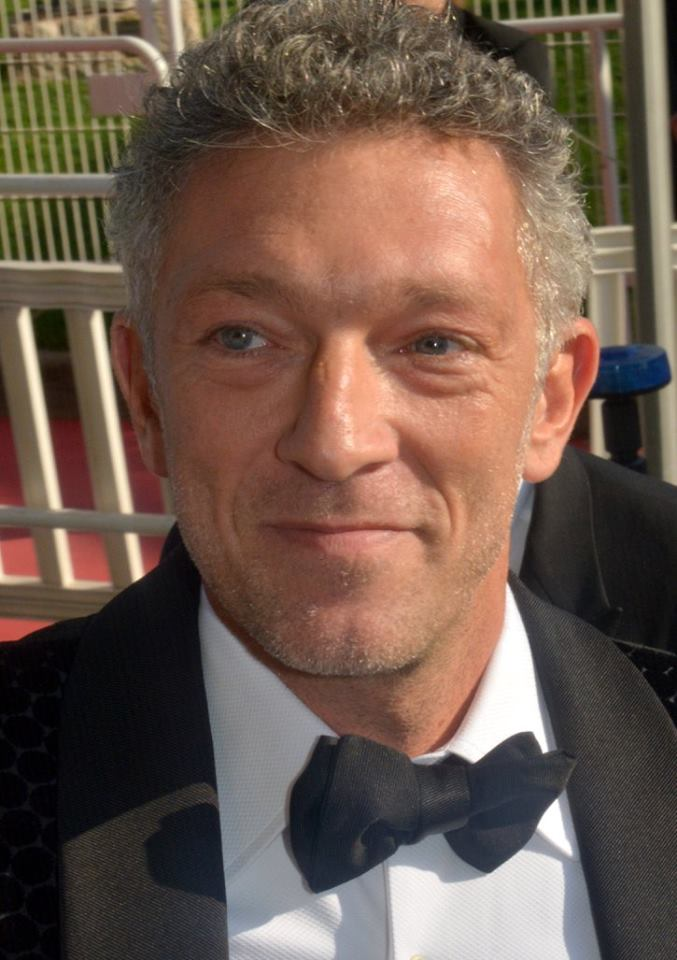
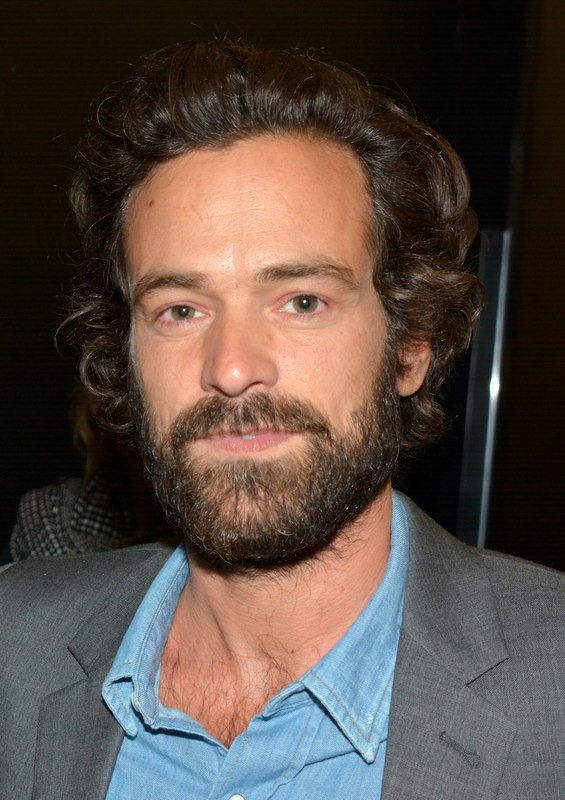
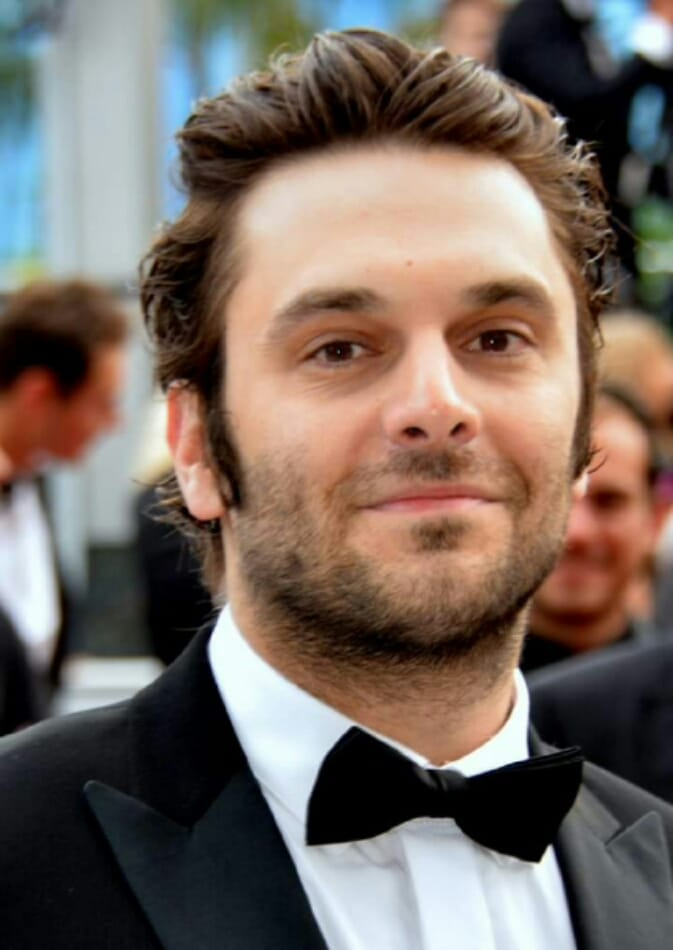
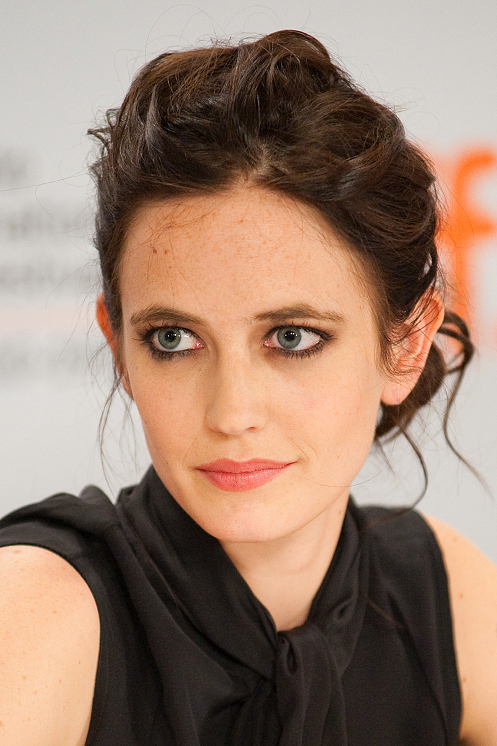
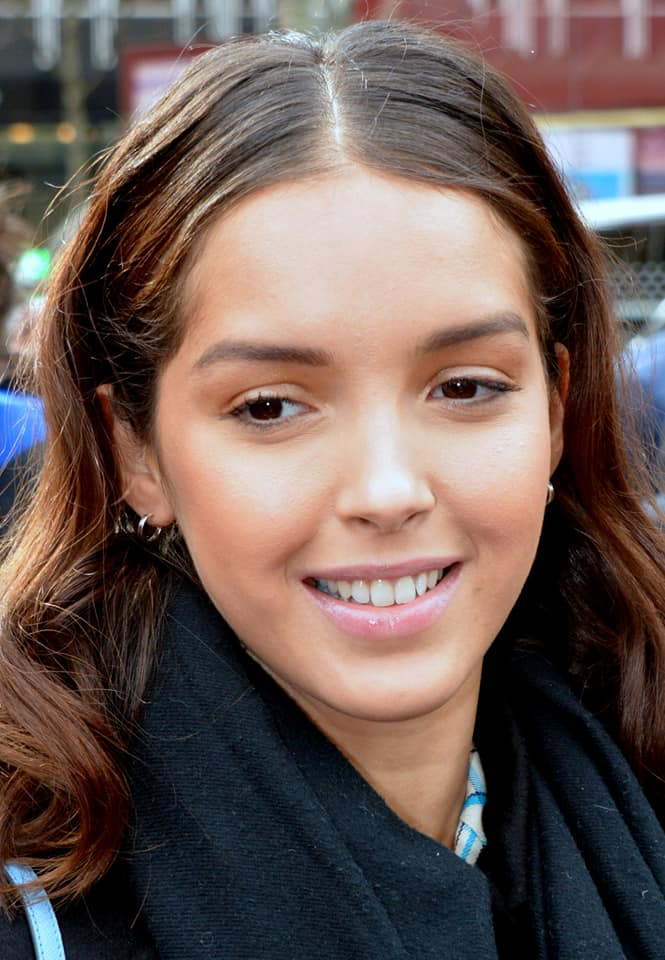
From left to right:
Top: François Civil (D'Artagnan), Vincent Cassel (Athos), Romain Duris (Aramis)
Bottom: Pio Marmaï (Porthos), Eva Green (Milady de Winter), and Lyna Khoudri (Constance Bonacieux).
- François Civil as D'Artagnan
- Vincent Cassel as Athos
- Romain Duris as Aramis
- Pio Marmaï as Porthos
- Eva Green as Milady de Winter
- Lyna Khoudri as Constance Bonacieux
- Louis Garrel as King Louis XIII
- Vicky Krieps as Anne of Austria
- Jacob Fortune-Lloyd as Duke of Buckingham
- Éric Ruf as Cardinal Richelieu
- Dominique Valadié as Marie de Médicis
- Julien Frison as Gaston, Duke of Orléans
- Thibault Vinçon as Horace Saint Blancard, leader of the Huguenot rebellions
- Marc Barbé as Captain de Tréville
- Alexis Michalik as Villeneuve de Radis
- Patrick Mille as Count de Chalais
- Ivan Franek as Ardanza
- Nicolas Vaude as the Judge
- Charlotte Ranson as Isabelle de Valcour

== Production ==
=== Development ===
The idea for the project started in 2019, when producer Dimitri Rassam spent the year looking for a subject that could spark a real event on the big screen and made a list of works that he wanted to produce, and one of them stood out: the 1844 novel The Three Musketeers by Alexandre Dumas. In December 2019, Rassam had a meeting with director Martin Bourboulon at a restaurant in Paris to talk about his desire to adapt the novel. During the meeting, Bourboulon remembered the 1994 film Revenge of the Musketeers directed by Bertrand Tavernier, which was produced by his father, Frédéric Bourboulon. During the summer of 1993, Bourboulon, aged 14, visited the set of Revenge of the Musketeers with his father and was impressed by the sets of the swashbuckling comedy filmed in the medieval alleys of Sarlat-la-Canéda and in the moat of the castle of Biron. With Bourboulon's verbal agreement, Rassam then recruited a duo of seasoned screenwriters: Matthieu Delaporte and Alexandre de La Patellière, and both immediately agreed.

On 13 May 2020, a meeting was held in Paris in the office of Chapter 2, Rassam's production company. A videoconference took place with Ardavan Safaee, president of Pathé Films, Rassam, Bourboulon, Delaporte and La Patellière. The two screenwriters presented a 60-page storyboard, summarizing their upcoming storyline for the project. Five hours later, the cutting was approved and the preparation for the film was launched, although the screenplay had not been finished. Contrary to the previous adaptations of the novel, Matthieu Delaporte and Alexandre de La Patellière wanted to make Dumas' work "a thriller in a violent world". Rassam described the project as "a response to American franchises".

On 29 June 2020, Pathé CEO Jérôme Seydoux announced that a new version of The Three Musketeers would be adapted for the cinema by his company. The screenplay started being written in the summer of 2020. On 14 October 2020, Pathé announced that the film would be split into two parts titled D'Artagnan and Milady, respectively, with Martin Bourboulon set to direct both films on a screenplay written by Matthieu Delaporte and Alexandre de La Patellière, and that shooting was expected to begin in France in summer 2021 and last seven months. Pathé also announced that both films would be released in 2023.

Produced by Dimitri Rassam for France's Chapter 2, a Mediawan Company, and Pathé, the two films were co-produced by M6 Films, Germany's Constantin Film, Spain's DeAPlaneta, and Belgium's Umedia. The combined production budget for the films was €72 million, (US$78.2 million in 2023): €36,08 million for D'Artagnan and €36,16 million for Milady (US$39.1 million), making it the second most expensive French production of 2023, behind Ladybug & Cat Noir: The Movie (€80 million). The score was composed by Guillaume Roussel.

This is the first French film adaptation of The Three Musketeers in 62 years, since Bernard Borderie's two-part saga was released in 1961.

Director Martin Bourboulon said that the inspirations for this new adaptation of The Three Musketeers were The Duellists (1977), Raiders of the Lost Ark (1981), Cyrano de Bergerac (1990), La Reine Margot (1994), Gladiator (2000), Elephant (2003), and The Revenant (2015).

=== Pre-production ===
On 11 February 2021, Variety announced the cast, which included François Civil as D'Artagnan, Eva Green as Milady de Winter, Vincent Cassel as Athos, Pio Marmaï as Porthos, Romain Duris as Aramis, Lyna Khoudri as Constance Bonacieux, Louis Garrel as King Louis XIII, Vicky Krieps as Anne of Austria, and Oliver Jackson-Cohen as the Duke of Buckingham. The saga was pre-bought by M6, OCS and Canal Plus in February 2021. Pathé released the films theatrically in France and handled the international sales.

On 23 November 2021, Pathé revealed the release dates for both films; 5 April 2023 for D'Artagnan, and 13 December 2023 for Milady, and also revealed the full cast; Ralph Amoussou as Hannibal, Éric Ruf as Cardinal Richelieu, Marc Barbé as Captain de Tréville, Patrick Mille as The Count of Chalais, and Jacob Fortune-Lloyd as the Duke of Buckingham, replacing Oliver Jackson-Cohen.

For the musketeers, director Martin Bourboulon and producer Dimitri Rassam had an ideal list and the four actors they had thought of said "yes". They approached the actors even before having the final versions of the scripts and started by casting D'Artagnan, and François Civil was their first choice and the first actor who was cast for the project. It was Civil's childhood dream to play D'Artagnan. When he learned that Rassam wanted to meet with him to talk about the project at the beginning of 2020, he decided to give his all, so he trimmed his mustache, put his hair in a little ponytail, impersonated D'Artagnan during the meeting and lied to Rassam by telling him that The Three Musketeers was his bedside book and that he knew it by heart, even though he had bought it only two days before in audiobook format and listened to it at 3x speed to try to speed up the story a little so that he could be ready for his meeting with Rassam. Civil said the meeting was a bit like D'Artagnan against Tréville, the captain of the musketeers, when he arrived saying he was ready to be a musketeer, as he did the same thing with Rassam and it worked. Rassam said that meeting served mainly to confirm that Civil was the right choice for the role. "He arrived with a D'Artagnan haircut, he knew the novel to perfection... Everything contributed to making him an obvious choice. He had the panache and boldness that was necessary to play the character," Rassam said. Later on, around six to eight months from the time he was cast to the time he received the script, Civil finally read the book during the first lockdown due to the COVID-19 pandemic. Prior to that, he had been familiar with The Three Musketeers since he was a child because he used to watch a cartoon in which the musketeers were portrayed as dogs. He also used to play musketeers at the schoolyard as a child.

Éric Ruf, who plays Cardinal Richelieu in this film, had previously played Aramis in the 2004 French film Milady and the Three Musketeers, directed by Josée Dayan.

Vincent Cassel also had a previous connection with The Three Musketeers. His father, Jean-Pierre Cassel, played King Louis XIII in The Three Musketeers (1973) by Richard Lester, and Cassel accompanied his father on set and was very moved by it. Jean-Pierre Cassel had also played D'Artagnan in Cyrano and d'Artagnan (1964) by Abel Gance.

Bourboulon and Rassam were looking for modernity and wanted strong female characters. For the role of Milady, they wanted to have a "mysterious actress" and Eva Green was cast; "everyone knows her but we don't see her every month at the cinema," Bourboulon said. Cassel recommended Green to Rassam before they started filming the Apple TV+ series Liaison and even before they had met each other in person, and shortly after that, she received the scripts and accepted the role. Green's fear of horses almost prevented her from taking on the role, but Italian horse trainer and stuntman Mario Luraschi gave her confidence and she managed to ride a horse.

This new adaptation of The Three Musketeers introduces a new character, Hannibal, portrayed by Ralph Amoussou, based on the true story of Aniaba, the prince of Assinie and France's first black musketeer.

Porthos, portrayed by Pio Marmaï, is bisexual in this version. Marmaï also had to gain 10 kilos for the role.

The four actors who played the musketeers met for the first time almost like in the novel: crossing swords at a fencing lesson. Olympic épée champion Yannick Borel trained the actors. Civil performed 90% of his own stunts, after six months of intense physical preparation on fencing, sword-fighting and horse-riding. Yannick Borel taught him postures and movements for five months, three hours a week. He then learned horse-riding with Marco Luraschi (who was also his understudy) at the ranch of the Luraschi family in Fontaine-Chaalis, and combat choreography with stuntmen Dominique and Sébastien Fouassier in a dojo in Paris. Civil was left temporarily blind in one eye for 36 hours due to an incorrectly applied make-up product on set. He broke his foot following a fall at home coming down from a stepladder and had to shoot the final scenes with a broken foot and protected by a huge foam shoe, which do not appear on screen.

Civil found that D'Artagnan was a little too insistent in his flirting with Constance Bonacieux, and even if it is written that way in Dumas' novel, he thought it would be interesting to modernize this seduction by injecting a little more respect into it, so he managed to have the scenes between the two of them rewritten. "The man does not occupy the same place today as in the 17th century, and that is why I was attentive to the writing of my scenes with Lyna Khoudri", Civil told Madame Figaro. He added that D'Artagnan keeps his panache and his somewhat clumsy side, but he is never "heavy" and "always remains charming" in the version of the screenplay written by Alexandre de La Patellière and Matthieu Delaporte. In turn, Constance is not portrayed as a passive woman and her relationship with D'Artagnan is "filled with respect and consent," Civil said.

Director Martin Bourboulon had initially forbidden the famous feathered hat of the musketeers, fearing that this accessory would make his costumes "old-fashioned", as he was looking for "dirt, authenticity, far from the Epinal image of the hat and its twirling feather," he said. He was convinced by the film's costume designer, Thierry Delettre, to change his mind and ended up adopting the hat. No digital effects were used in the film, except to erase a few contemporary elements such as bus shelters or parking meters appearing in the background.

=== Filming ===
The two films were shot back to back for 150 days on location in France, in landmarks such as the Louvre Palace, the Hôtel des Invalides, the Castles of Fontainebleau and Saint-Germain-en-Laye, Fort-la-Latte and Chantilly, as well as the citadel of Saint-Malo and the historic city center of Troyes. Filming began on 16 August 2021, and wrapped on 3 June 2022 at the Farcheville castle. 2000 costumes, 930 technicians, 650 horses and 9,000 extras were used in the production.

== Marketing ==
The first still from the film was unveiled on 2 September 2021. On 19 April 2022, French magazine Première released two covers with the film's main cast (François Civil, Vincent Cassel, Romain Duris, Pio Marmaï and Eva Green). Two new stills from the film featuring D'Artagnan, Athos and Milady were unveiled on 5 May 2022.

Pathé and Chapter 2 presented a 15-minute promo reel of the film at the 2022 Cannes Film Festival.

A teaser trailer and the film's official poster were unveiled on 5 December 2022. The official trailer was released on 15 February 2023. Individual character posters were unveiled on 15 March 2023.

Unifrance unveiled a new trailer with English subtitles on 20 March 2023.

== Soundtrack ==
The album with the film's official soundtrack composed by Guillaume Roussel, was released by Milan Records on 5 April 2023.

Les Trois Mousquetaires : D'Artagnan (Bande originale du film)

Soundtrack album by Guillaume Roussel
- Released: 5 April 2023
- Genre: Film soundtrack
- Length: 41:55
- Label: Milan Records

=== Track listing ===
All tracks are written by Guillaume Roussel.

Les Trois Mousquetaires : D'Artagnan (Bande originale du film)
No.	Title	Length
1.	"Bois Saint-Sulpice"	03:37
2.	"La lettre de Buckingham"	03:22
3.	"La cour des Mousquetaires"	02:17
4.	"Le procès d'Athos"	01:34
5.	"Conseil du roi"	01:40
6.	"Chevauchée vers l'auberge"	00:44
7.	"D'Artagnan et Constance"	03:31
8.	"Buckingham accoste"	02:08
9.	"Le piège"	01:31
10.	"Adieu Athos"	02:46
11.	"En route pour l'Angleterre"	01:15
12.	"Feu de camp"	01:04
13.	"La fleur de lys"	01:57
14.	"Les démons d'Athos"	01:51
15.	"Milady - L'attentat"	03:02
16.	"Les ferrets"	04:26
17.	"L'enlèvement de Constance"	01:52
18.	"Générique d'Artagnan"	03:34
Total length:		41:55

== Release ==
The film was released theatrically in France by Pathé on 5 April 2023, the same day in Belgium by Alternative Films, in Germany on 13 April 2023 by Constantin Film, and in Spain by DeAPlaneta on 14 April 2023. The film was available in IMAX, 4DX and Dolby Cinema.

On 15 June 2023, Variety announced that both the film and its sequel, Milady, had been acquired by Samuel Goldwyn Films to be released in US theatres in December 2023 and 2024 respectively. It was later announced that the film would be simultaneously released in theaters and video on demand in the United States on 8 December 2023 with the title The Three Musketeers – Part I: D'Artagnan.

The Three Musketeers: D'Artagnan was re-released in French theaters on 6 December 2023, a week before the release of The Three Musketeers: Milady.

According to Unifrance, the film has been acquired by local distributors in 71 territories, excluding India, which has not been listed on the website, even though M International Media and PEN Marudhar/PEN India Ltd released the film in select Indian theaters on 23 June 2023.

== Reception ==
=== Box office ===
The film was released to 732 theaters in France, where it debuted at number two at the box office (behind The Super Mario Bros. Movie), selling over one million tickets and grossing $5.6 million in its first week. In its second weekend, the film grossed $16.6 million from 21 markets and was the ninth highest-grossing film at the global box office. In its third weekend, the film reached two million tickets sold in France, remaining at number two at the box office, and grossed $24 million worldwide from 30 markets. In its sixth weekend, the film reached three million tickets sold in France and was placed at number four at the box office.

In April 2023, the film sold over 1.36 million tickets outside France from over 40 markets. The film debuted at number three in Poland on 12 May 2023 and was watched by 47,000 people in its opening weekend. In May 2023, it became the third highest-grossing French film of 2023 outside France, earning over €8.3 million, with over 1.54 million tickets sold.

The Three Musketeers: D'Artagnan was the third highest-grossing French film of 2023, the eighth highest-grossing film of 2023 in France, and the fifth highest-grossing French film internationally, selling over 3.4 million tickets in France after 22 weeks in theaters, 1.65 million tickets outside France from 58 markets, A third of the film's total admissions came from Latin America, (378,000 in Mexico, 106,000 in Brazil, and 57,000 in Colombia) The film grossed €9.10 million outside France, and $35 million worldwide.

=== Streaming viewership ===
The Three Musketeers: D'Artagnan was featured on the top 10 of the most watched non-English-speaking films of the world on Netflix following its release in Central and South America in late November 2023. It was ranked number three in Argentina and Uruguay, and number four in Peru. From 27 November to 3 December 2023, the film had 1.7 million views on Netflix and was on the top 10 in 17 countries in Latin America (except Brazil).

=== Critical response ===
The film received generally positive reviews from critics.

==== France ====
Fabrice Leclerc of Paris Match gave the film four out of five stars and wrote; "Adventure, thriller, humor, everything is royally dosed in this breathtaking show, embodied by a meticulous and gourmet cast."

Maroussia Dubreuil of Le Monde gave the film three out of five stars and praised its two main female characters, writing; "this first opus participates in the great catch-up session of feminism by offering bold scores to its two protagonists, Milady and Mademoiselle Bonacieux".

==== International ====
Rotten Tomatoes gives the film a score of 98% based on 51 reviews, with a weighted average of 7.50/10. The website's critical consensus starts with "All for one and one for all!", referencing a quote from the 1844 novel, and then continues by stating: "The Three Musketeers: D'Artagnan stands as a gallant reinterpretation of the source material." Metacritic assigned the film a weighted average score of 79 out of 100, based on 10 critics, indicating "generally favorable reviews". AlloCiné, a French cinema site, gave the film an average rating of 3.7/5, based on a survey of 37 French reviews.

Peter Bradshaw of The Guardian gave the film four out of five stars and wrote; "This is a lavishly produced, very enjoyable innocent pleasure." The same magazine also named The Three Musketeers: D'Artagnan as one of the best films of 2023.

=== Awards and nominations ===
Award	Date of ceremony	Category	Recipient(s)	Result	Ref.
César Awards	23 February 2024	Best Cinematography	Nicolas Bolduc	Nominated	
César Awards	23 February 2024	Best Sound	David Rit, Gwennolé Le Borgne, Olivier Touche, Cyril Holtz, and Niels Barletta	Nominated	
César Awards	23 February 2024	Best Original Music	Guillaume Roussel	Nominated	
César Awards	23 February 2024	Best Costume Design	Thierry Delettre	Nominated	
César Awards	23 February 2024	Best Production Design	Stéphane Taillasson	Won	
César Awards	23 February 2024	Best Visual Effects	Olivier Cauwet	Nominated	
Paris Film Critics Awards	4 February 2024	Best Adapted Screenplay	Alexandre de La Patellière and Mathieu Delaporte	Nominated	
Paris Film Critics Awards	4 February 2024	Best Supporting Actor	Louis Garrel	Nominated	
Paris Film Critics Awards	4 February 2024	Best Production Design	Stéphane Taillasson	Nominated	
Paris Film Critics Awards	4 February 2024	Best Costume Design	Thierry Delettre	Won	

== Spin-off TV series ==
On 21 October 2022, Pathé and Chapter 2 announced they are developing two spin-off TV series titled Milady Origins and Black Musketeer.
