= Beating Sun =

2022 French drama film

- Directed by: Philippe Petit
- Screenplay by: Philippe Petit; Marcia Romano
- Produced by: Frédéric Dubreuil
- Starring: Swann Arlaud; Sarah Adler
- Cinematography: Pierre-Hubert Martin
- Edited by: Valentin Feron
- Music by: Andy Cartwright
- Release date: 2022
- Country: France

Beating Sun (French: Tant que le soleil frappe, lit. 'As long as the sun beats down') is a 2022 French drama film co-written and directed by Philippe Petit and starring Swann Arlaud and Sarah Adler. It premiered at the 79th edition of the Venice Film Festival.

== Cast ==
- Swann Arlaud as Max Laborit
- Sarah Adler as Alma
- Grégoire Oestermann as Paul Moudenc
- Pascal Rénéric as Gaspard
- Lee Fortuné-Petit as Margot
- Djibril Cissé as himself
- Marc Robert as Tom
- Philippe Petit as Seb

== Release ==
The film premiered at the 79th Venice International Film Festival, in the International Critics' Week sidebar. It was released in French cinemas on 8 February 2023.

== Reception ==
Screen International critic Jonathan Holland described the film as "a thought-provoking feature debut plays like a less-shouty Ken Loach, presenting its big ideas on a small canvas, remaining low-key rather than bombastic, and keeping a careful eye on the truthfulness of its characters so that it never feels like agitprop." According to Fabien Lemercier from Cineuropa, the film is "a very engaging first feature film" that "offers both a portrait of an outsider that is touching in his obstinacy at the crossroads of an existence [...] and a fundamental reflection on urban landscapes".
