= Guillaume Bats =

French humorist (1987–2023)

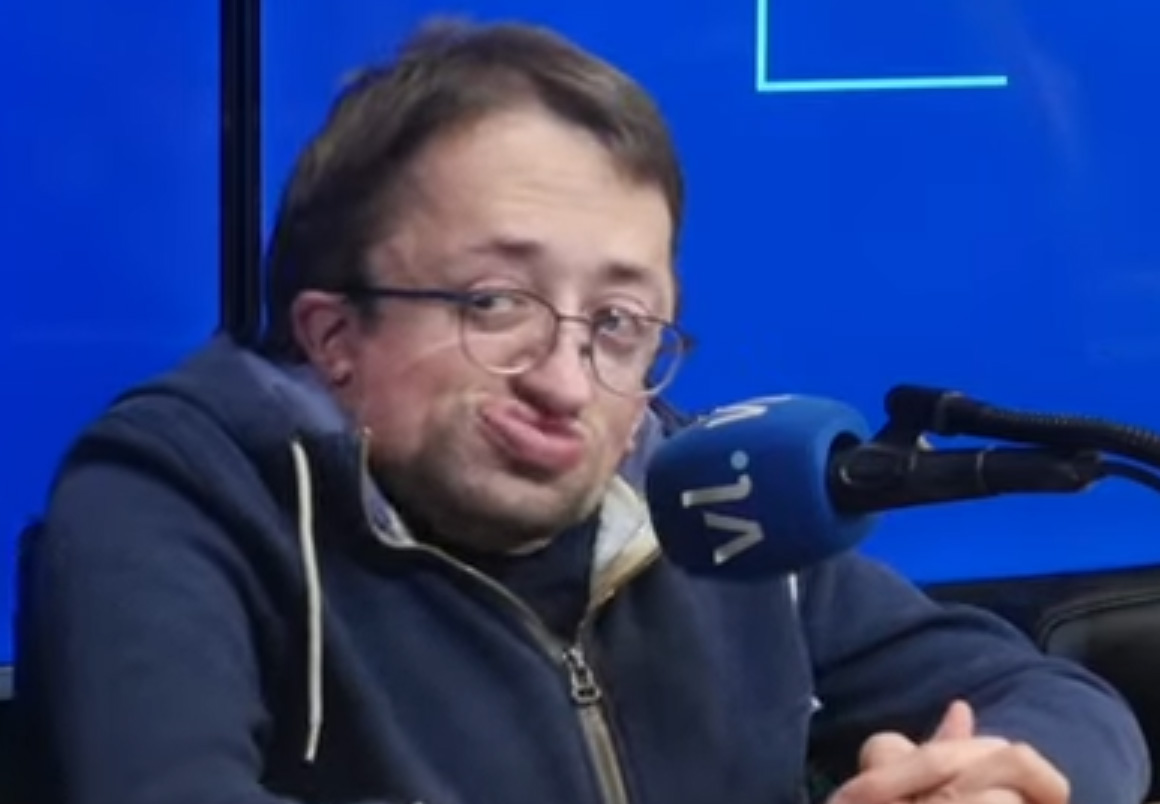
- Bats in 2021
- Born: Guillaume Batreau; April 14, 1987; Reims, France
- Died: 1 June 2023 (aged 36); Paris, France

Comedy career
- Years active: 1987–2023
- Medium: Stand-up; television
- Genres: Observational comedy; sketch comedy; satire
- Subjects: everyday life; pop culture

Guillaume Bats was a French humorist.

== Biography ==
=== Early years and education ===
Guillaume Bats was born Guillaume Batreau on April 14, 1987, in Reims, France.

From birth, he suffered from osteogenesis imperfecta known as "glass bone disease". His parents placed him with the DDASS at the age of 1 (he did not see his mother again until he was 15). He has a brother (a fraternal twin, not affected by the disease) and a half-brother. He remained in a nursery until the age of 4, then entered an orphanage where he stayed during the week and spent the weekends with a foster family. At the age of 7, he stayed there full-time, but had to leave the family two years later.

After a spell with a family he found "unloving", he was taken in by an older lady with grown-up children. He considered her his "mother of heart", and her children his aunts and uncles.

=== Death ===
Guillaume Bats was due to take part in a conference on disability when he was found dead at his home in the 3rd arrondissement of Paris on 1st June 2023 by his friend and producer Jérémy Ferrari, who was concerned about his silence. The news was announced on social networks by his production team, the day after the Canal+ broadcast of Jean-Pascal Zadi's sketch Kôkôrikô! in which Guillaume Bats took part.

== Career ==
=== Beginning ===
In October 2011, Guillaume Bats took part in the FIEALD open stage at the Théâtre Trévise. His sketch Elle est pas belle la vie? was selected and posted on Dailymotion, where in 2014 it had over 300,000 views9. He was approached to sign production contracts, but preferred to take time to think things over.

==== National Television: "On n'demande qu'à en rire" TV SHOW ====
Wishing to take part in Laurent Ruquier's show On n'demande qu'à rire on France 2, he contacted comedian Jérémy Ferrari, one of the show's residents, to rework the writing of a sketch: "I was aware of my shortcomings in terms of writing. He agreed, but only on condition that I rework all the sketches in my show [Tous tordus]. At first, I wasn't too keen, but then I agreed: I don't regret it. He's very rigorous, very demanding, almost obsessive in his work, whereas I tend to let myself live...".

In December 2011, Guillaume Bats took part in Waly Dia's Père Noël devant les grands magasins sketch. He returned as a guest star in March 2012 in a sketch by Les Lascars gays, then also in Jérémy Ferrari's sketch, L'Adoption pour les nuls, in which he parodied his own disability and scored top marks (100/100). He then went solo on the show, appearing twice, with co-writer Jérémy Ferrari.

At the same time, he opened for a number of French comedians, including Anthony Kavanagh, Jean-Marie Bigard and the Comte de Bouderbala.

Notable Stand-ups: "Attention à la tête, Hors cadre" and "Inchallah (2013-2023)

In 2013, Guillaume Bats created his first one-man show, Attention à la tête, which he performed for over a year at the Petit Gymnase in Paris.

In early 2014, in addition to his own Parisian and provincial dates, he opened for Jérémy Ferrari on his Zeniths tour, an experience the two comedians had already worked out at La Cigale, Casino de Paris and Olympia between February and May 2013. He also took part in the reopening of the Le République theater (formerly Caveau de la République), directed by the Comte de Bouderbala.

In 2015, he performed sketches on L'Énorme TV in the weekly show presented by Laurent Baffie, Open Bars. The comedian also takes part in Ferrari's annual Duos Impossibles gala broadcast on C8 and in numerous sketches with Laura Laune.

In the summer of 2017, he created his second one-man show, Hors Cadre, at the Avignon Festival, produced by Jérémy Ferrari and Éric Antoine. He performed it on tour and at the Comédie des Boulevards (now the Théâtre le Métropole) in Paris until March 2019. He continued to perform regularly throughout France, as well as opening for other comedians such as Vérino and Jarry. From November to December 2017, he opened for Michaël Gregorio four times at the Olympia, out of the artist's sixteen scheduled performances.

In January 2023, Guillaume Bats began touring his new show Inchallah ("Crossing fingers"), again written with Jérémy Ferrari. Bats announced on his website about this show: "Notre-Dame burned, not him! Paris's funniest gargoyle descends from the cathedral to take to the stage once again for repairs."

=== Stand-ups list ===
Here is the list of shows:

- 2011 : Tous tordus (one-man-show, "All ugly")
- 2013-2014 : Attention à la tête (one-man-show, "Mind your head")
- 2017-2019 : Hors Cadre (one-man-show, "Out of Frame")
- 2023 : Inchallah (one-man-show, "Crossing fingers")
