= Two Tickets to Greece =

- Original title: Les Cyclades
- Directed by: Marc Fitoussi
- Written by: Marc Fitoussi
- Starring: Laure Calamy Olivia Côte Kristin Scott Thomas
- Cinematography: Antoine Roch
- Edited by: Catherine Schwartz
- Music by: Mocky
- Release date: 11 January 2023 (France)
- Running time: 110 minutes
- Countries: France; Belgium

Two Tickets to Greece (Original title: Les Cyclades) is a 2022 French comedy film written and directed by Marc Fitoussi, and starring Laure Calamy, Olivia Côte and Kristin Scott Thomas.

== Plot ==
In Paris in 2019, Blandine, a recently divorced single mother, is the definition of despondence as her beloved 20-year- old son, Benji, leaves home. Benji worries about her mother's melancholy moods and arranges for her to meet her childhood best friend, Magalie, who is impulsive, fearless and cheerful. The first reunion does not go well but Benji does not give up, arranging two tickets to Greece for the pair to visit the island of Amorgos. As teenagers, Blandine and Magalie's idea of a dream vacation was visiting Amorgos where Luc Besson’s film The Big Blue was shot. It quickly becomes apparent that Magalie and Blandine have very different approaches to holidaying and life. Kristin Scott Thomas plays Magalie’s friend and mentor, who does not give two hoots about accepted norms of social behaviour.

== Synopsis ==
Our teenage selves are not so different to our adult personalities is the underlying theme of the film. Three decades have flown by; youthful bravado, teenage dreams and schemes are a fleeting memory or words in a diary. As Blandine suffers the chaotic Magalie who lives in the moment, she too begins to loosens up and little signs begin to appear that she is letting go of grief.

The film also plays on the nostalgia of Luc Besson's The Big Blue, also showing in Amorgós a shop selling souvenirs dedicated to The Big Blue. Also Blandine goes to the Chozoviótissa monastery which was popularized by Besson's film.

== Reception ==
Writing for Variety, Catherine Bray notes that despite occasional detours into darker themes, this is fundamentally a relaxing trip for an audience. "Writer-director Marc Fitoussi paces his film in a relaxed fashion; you wouldn’t need to cut much actual plot to shave 20 minutes off the runtime. And if these cuts could be focused on the first half of the film, that would mean we’d get to Kristin Scott Thomas sooner."

The film has other things going for it. Including shots of idyllic Greek beaches, island, then there is a magical flashback scene in the taverna, where an exuberantly dancing Magalie disappears behind a pillar and emerges from the other side as her teenage self.
