= Les Vengeances de Maître Poutifard =

2023 film by Pierre-François Martin-Laval

- Directed by: Pierre-François Martin-Laval
- Written by: Pierre-François Martin-Laval
- Starring: Christian Clavier; Isabelle Nanty
- Music by: Gisèle Gérard-Tolini
- Distributed by: Apollo Films
- Release date: 28 June 2023
- Running time: 81 minutes
- Country: France
- Language: French
- Budget: 1.56 million euros

Les Vengeances de Maître Poutifard is a 2023 French comedy film directed by Pierre-François Martin-Laval.

The film is inspired by the 2004 book La Troisième Vengeance de Robert Poutifard, by Jean-Claude Mourlevat.

== Plot ==
Robert Poutifard, a primary school teacher, bullied by his own pupils, meets Claudine, a teacher from Quebec who has recently arrived at his school. They sympathize and begin a relationship. However, four of Robert"s pupils see the budding love with anger; they are Anthony Lecain, Audrey Nabindibo, and the twins Camille and Mélanie Guillot. They sabotage Robert's marriage proposal to Claudine, which causes their breakup. This triggers Robert's desire for revenge.

Nineteen years later, Robert, now retired, spends his free time trying to put his plan into practice, with the help of his mother, Huguette, a specialist in new technologies. In the meantime, the four former pupils have built their own career: Audrey has become a successful singer engaged in numerous causes, Anthony has become a mediatic and famous chef, while the twins Camille and Mélanie have become admired and highly-followed influencers.

Taking his former pupils by surprise, Robert causes the closing of Anthony's restaurant during the arrival of an important food critic, with the help of an ultrasound instrument and the molosser dog Brutus.

He then has the twins banned from the Internet by the President of the French Republic in person, during their official meeting on a big construction site they have sponsored.

The third mission, which consists in ruining the reputation of Audrey during her concert, is compromised by the fact that the security agent of the concert is Bouli, the former favourite pupil of Robert. He introduces the son of Audrey to Robert: realising the first has a rare serious disease, the latter decides to seek reconciliation with his former pupils. He organizes a reunion with Anthony, Audrey, Camille and Mélanie, where he apoligizes for his actions and explains his motivations. Touched by his sincerity, they forgive him and decide to help Audrey's son in his struggle against his disease.

Robert, now in peace with his past, can finally enjoy his retirement with his mother Huguette, while his former pupils continue to achieve success in their careers, but with a new appreciation for their former teacher. Claudine, touched by the change of Robert, contacts him again and they resume their long-interrupted relationship.

== Cast ==
- Christian Clavier as Robert Poutifard
- Isabelle Nanty as Huguette Poutifard
- Jennie-Anne Walker as Claudine Haignerelle
- Roby Schinasi as Anthony Lecain
- Salomé Partouche as Camille Guillot
- Noémie Chicheportiche as Mélanie Guillot
- Kezia Quintal as Audrey Nabindibo alias O'Drey
- Oussama Kheddam as Bouli
- Tom Novembre as the vigil of the concert hall
- Gabrielle Lazure as Claudine's mother
- Guy Lafrance as Claudine's father
- Mourade Zeguendi as Petit Jean
- Pierre-François Martin-Laval as the President of the French Republic
- Jacky Nercessian as the food critic

== Reception ==
The film received mostly negative reviews from critics. Le Parisien described the main character as "psychopathic and abject", and stated that the film included "a collection of caricatural characters", giving it one half-star out of five. Télérama described the film as "anti-young and anti-woke", giving it one star out of five.

== Box-office ==
For the first week of broadcast in the French halls, Les Vengeances de Maître Poutifard reunited 180,735 viewers. The total of entries progressively declined the following weeks.
