= Marie Bunel =

French film and stage actress

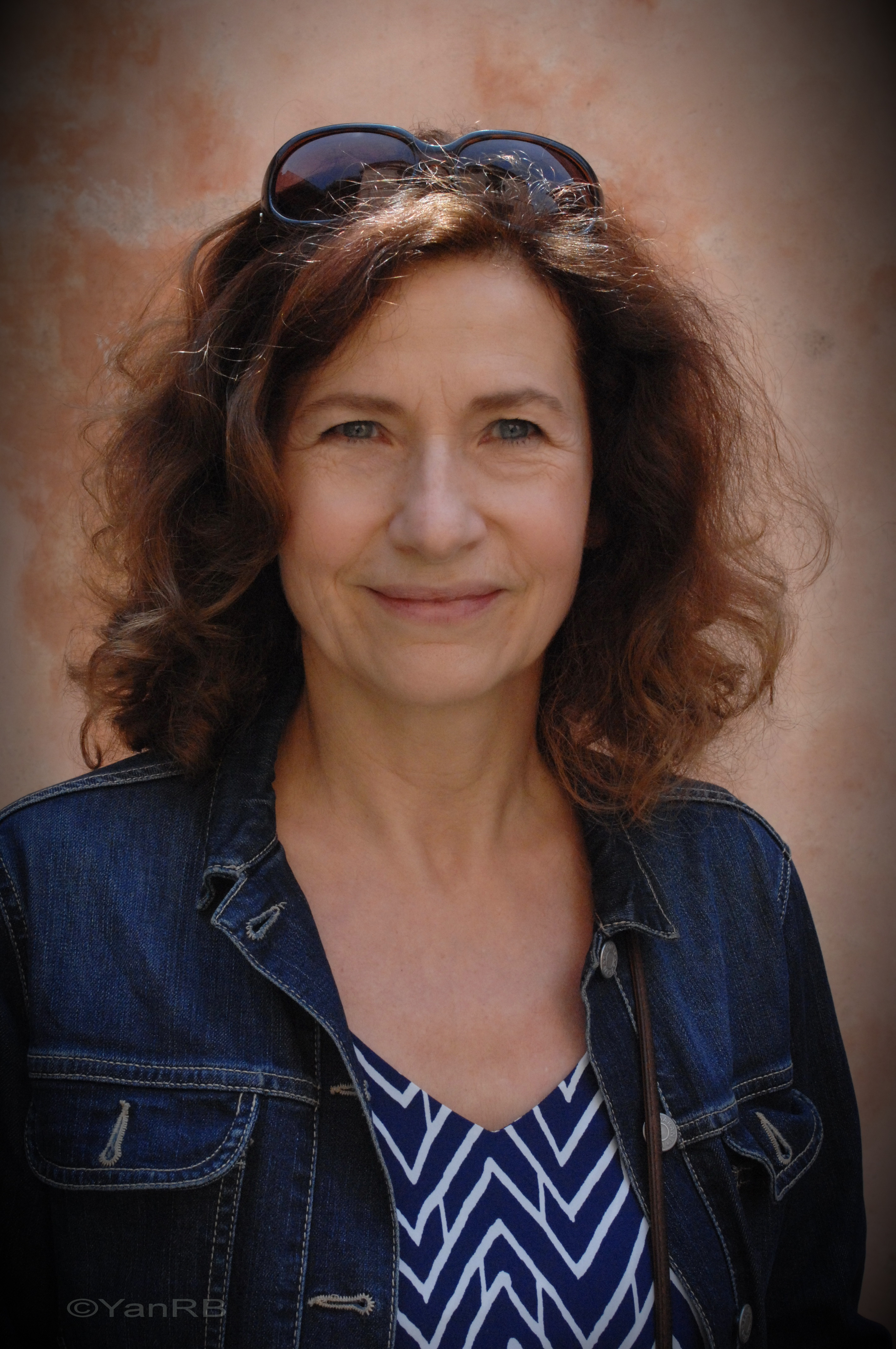
- Born: 27 May 1961 (age 64); Saint-Maur-des-Fossés, Val-de-Marne, France
- Occupation: Actor
- Years active: 1977–present
- Spouse: Vincent Winterhalter

Marie Bunel (born 1961) is a French film and stage actress.

== Biography ==
Bunel was born on 27 May 1961 in Saint-Maur-des-Fossés, Val-de-Marne, France. She attended the Lee Strasberg Theatre and Film Institute in West Hollywood, California and took classes from Blanche Salant at the American Center of Paris.

She is married to actor Vincent Winterhalter, whose late father was actor Vania Vilers (1938-2009).

== Work ==
=== Feature films ===
- Holiday Hotel (dir. Michel Lang, 1977)
- Les Filles du régiment (dir. Claude Bernard-Aubert, 1978)
- La Boum 2 (dir. Claude Pinoteau, 1982)
- The Blood of Others (dir. Claude Chabrol, 1984)
- Gros Dégueulasse (dir. Bruno Zincone, 1985)
- Le Gaffeur (dir. Serge Pénard, 1985)
- Story of Women (dir. Claude Chabrol, 1988)
- La Révolution française (dir. Robert Enrico, Richard T. Heffron, 1989)
- La Reine blanche (dir. Jean-Loup Hubert, 1990)
- Le Secret de Sarah Tombelaine (dir. Daniel Lacambre, 1990)
- La Discrète (dir. Christian Vincent, 1990)
- Gito l'ingrat (dir. Léonce Ngabo, 1992)
- Rupture(s) (dir. Christine Citti, 1992)
- Couples et Amants (dir. John Lvoff, 1993)
- Le Bateau de mariage (dir. Jean-Pierre Améris, 1994)
- Les Misérables (dir. Claude Lelouch, 1994)
- Lou n'a pas dit non (dir. Anne-Marie Miéville, 1994)
- Au petit Marguery (dir. Laurent Bénégui, 1995)
- Ma vie en rose (dir. Alain Berliner, 1997)
- Family Pack (dir. Chris Vander Stappen, 2000)
- Seventeen Times Cecile Cassard (dir. Christophe Honoré, 2002)
- Les Fautes d'orthographe (dir. Jean-Jacques Zilbermann, 2004)
- The Chorus (dir. Christophe Barratier, 2004)
- Saint-Jacques… La Mecque (dir. Coline Serreau, 2004)
- Arsène Lupin (dir. Jean-Paul Salomé, 2004)
- Le Silence de la Mer (dir. Pierre Boutron, 2004)
- Demandez la permission aux enfants (dir. Éric Civanyan, 2007)
- A Girl Cut in Two (dir. Claude Chabrol, 2007)
- Trois Amis (dir. Michel Boujenah, 2007)
- Bellamy (dir. Claude Chabrol, 2009)
- La Ligne blanche (dir. Olivier Torres, 2011)
- La nouvelle guerre des boutons (dir. Christophe Barratier, 2011)
- Jappeloup (dir. Christian Duguay, 2013)
- An Accidental Soldier (dir. Rachel Ward, 2013)
- C'est beau la vie quand on y pense (dir. Gérard Jugnot, 2017)
- Someone, Somewhere (Deux moi) (dir. Cédric Klapisch, 2019)
- Les petites victoires (dir. Mélanie Auffret, 2023)
- Little Girl Blue (dir. Mona Achache, 2023)

=== Television ===
- A Tale of Two Cities (1989)
- Joséphine, ange gardien (1 Episode, 2015)

=== Short films ===
- Une soirée perdue (dir. Cécile Decugis, 1984)
- Amélie palace (dir. Marie Hélia, 1991)
- Passera-t-il ? (dir. Claude Duty, 1991)
- Paroles passagères (dir. Denis Jutzeler, 1992)
- La Fête des mères (dir. Chris Vander Stappen, 1998)
- Pluies (dir. Véronique Aubouy, 2004)
- Poids plume (dir. Nolwenn Lemesle, 2005)
- Juste une heure (dir. Virginie Peignien, 2007)

=== Theater ===
- Ce sacré bonheur (Jean Cosmos, Théâtre Montparnasse, 1986)
- Le Radeau de la Méduse (Roger Planchon, TNP Villeurbanne, 1995)
- Un cœur français (Jean-Marie Besset, Théâtre Hébertot, 1996)
- Le Radeau de la Méduse (Roger Planchon, Théâtre national de la Colline, 1996)
- Oncle Vania (Anton Tchekhov, Théâtre Hébertot, 1996)
- La Boutique au coin de la rue (Miklos Laszlo, 2002)
- Le Meilleur professeur (Daniel Besse, 2005)
- La Femme d'avant (Roland Schimmelpfennig, Théâtre des Célestins, 2006)
- Oncle Vania (Anton Tchekhov, Théâtre des Bouffes du Nord, Théâtre du Gymnase, Théâtre National de Nice, Théâtre des Célestins, 2009)
- Rêve d'Automne (Jon Fosse, Musée du Louvre, Théâtre de la Ville, 2010)
- Rêve d'Automne (Jon Fosse, La Criée, 2011)
