= Damien Ounouri =

French-Algerian screenwriter

- Born: 1982 (age 43–44); Clermont-Ferrand
- Education: Sorbonne University
- Occupation: Film director
- Spouse: Adila Bendimerad

Damien Ounouri (born 1982) is a French-Algerian film director.

== Early life and education ==
Born in 1982 in Clermont-Ferrand to a French mother and Algerian father. Ounouri studied film theory at Sorbonne University.

== Career ==
Ounouri's first feature film titled Fidaï is a documentary on the Algerian Revolution which was selected at the Toronto International Film Festival and has won several awards.

== Filmography ==
- Kindil El Bahr
- Fidaï
- Away from Nedjma
- Xiao Jia going home
- Changping, Sonata in a small Chinese town
- The Last Queen

== Awards and nominations ==
Year	Award	Category	Film	Result	Ref
2013	FEST New Directors/New Films Festival	Best Documentary	Fidaï	Won	
2008	Taiwan International Documentary Film Festival	Asian Vision Award	Xiao Jia Going Home	Nominated	
2016	Cannes Film Festival	Illy Prize	Kindil El Bahr	Nominated	
2017	Luxor African Film Festival	Audience Award for Best Short Narrative; Best Artistic Achievement	Kindil El Bahr	Won	
