= A Great Friend =

- French: Les choses simples
- Directed by: Éric Besnard
- Written by: Éric Besnard
- Starring: Lambert Wilson Grégory Gadebois Marie Gillain
- Cinematography: Jean-Marie Dreujou
- Music by: Christophe Julien
- Release date: 18 January 2023
- Running time: 95 minutes
- Country: France
- Language: French

A Great Friend (Original title: Les choses simples) is a French comedy-drama film directed as well as written by Éric Besnard and released in 2023.

== Cast ==
- Lambert Wilson
- Grégory Gadebois
- Marie Gillain
- Antoine Gouy
- Amandine Longeac
- Déborah Lamy
- Pasquale d'Inca
- Pascal Gimenez
- Betty Pierucci Berthoud
- Magali Bonnat

== Synopsis ==
A Great Friend is the clash of two opposite worlds. In one lives Vincent who is a successful businessman besides being egocentric and always hurried. Then there is Pierre, a fair but stubborn chap who lives like a recluse in magnificent nature. When Vincent's car breaks down on a small mountain road in the middle of nowhere, Pierre comes to his aid. Their meeting upsets their respective certainties and they come to realise that there is much each can learn from the other.

The film invites the audience to reflect if they are really living the lives they want to and also to appreciate the simple things referred to in the original French title.

== Production ==
Filming took place between August and October 2021 in the Maurienne valley in Saint-François-Longchamp and Modane (Savoie), as well as in the Pays de Gex in Crozet (Ain).

== Critical reception ==
The film had generally positive critical reception, for the most part:

According to the editorial team at sortiraparis.com, "The pitch of the film may seem cliché, but it's only the beginning that is. A twist arrives fairly quickly in the script that reshuffles the deck... The result is a nice film full of good feelings... where the director invites us to slow down to appreciate the small things."

To Simon Morris at RNZ, A Great Friend is what happens when you enliven an apparently familiar story with two unfamiliar characters. "In French cinema, a story isn't always about reaching a convenient conclusion. Sometimes it's about watching how people change – in this case, from odd couple to great friends. With an ending I didn't see coming. Not a bad formula for a good movie."

La Presse's Olivia doesn't have flattering words for this Éric Besnard film: "The problem is that we find it hard to believe in this meeting [of Vincent and Pierre] and their discussion does not convince us. The dialogues are poor, just like the scenario is simplistic and the direction of Éric Besnard (Délicieux), lazy and without finesse." In fact, she does go on to praise some aspects, that "the acting duo is still quite successful. The setting is majestic, but the film is predictable and without any originality."
