= Éric Ruf =

French actor (born 1969)

- Born: 21 May 1969 (age 57); Belfort, France
- Occupation: Actor
- Years active: 1995–present

Éric Ruf (born 21 May 1969) is a French actor, set designer and theatre director. He has appeared in more than thirty films since 1995. He joined the Comédie-Française in 1993, became a sociétaire in 1998 and was administrator from 2014 to 2025.

== Selected filmography ==
Year	Title	Role	Notes
1996	The Proprietor		
1998	Place Vendôme		
2005	Les Rois maudits	Philippe, Count of Poitiers	
2010	The Big Picture		
2011	R.I.F.		
2011	À la recherche du temps perdu		
2012	Nobody Else But You	Simon Denner	
2013	Going Away		
2019	J'accuse	Jean Sandherr	
2023	The Three Musketeers: D'Artagnan	Cardinal Richelieu	
2023	The Three Musketeers: Milady	Cardinal Richelieu	
2026	Comédie-Française	Man in lift	
