= Les petites victoires =

- Directed by: Mélanie Auffret
- Written by: Mélanie Auffret; Michaël Souhaité; Romain Compingt; Yoann Gromb
- Produced by: Foucauld Barre; Nicolas Duval Adassovsky
- Starring: Michel Blanc; Julia Piaton
- Cinematography: Laurent Dailland
- Edited by: Jeanne Kef
- Music by: Julien Glabs
- Production companies: Quad; Zinc
- Distributed by: Zinc
- Release date: 1 March 2023
- Running time: 89 minutes
- Country: France
- Language: French
- Budget: $6 million
- Box office: $7.1 million

Les petites victoires is a 2023 French film directed by Mélanie Auffret. It had its world premiere at the L'Alpe d'Huez International Comedy Film Festival on January 19, 2023.

== Cast ==
- Michel Blanc as Emile Menoux
- Julia Piaton as Alice Le Guennic
- Lionel Abelanski as Saturnin
- Marie Bunel as Claudine
- India Hair as Pauline
- Marie-Pierre Casey as Jeannine
- Sébastien Chassagne as Patrick
- Géraldine Schitter as Lorraine
