= 2020 Canneseries =

2020 television festival

2020 Cannes International Series Festival
- Location: Cannes, France
- Founded: 2018
- Awards: Best Series (Partisan)
- Festival date: 9–14 October 2020
- Website: canneseries.com/en

Canneseries
- 2021 2019

The 3rd Cannes International Series Festival is a television festival that took place in Cannes, France. The festival was scheduled to be held on 27 March to 1 April but postponed to 9 to 14 October, due to COVID-19 pandemic-related concerns and was held in-person/virtual hybrid. American writer and director Darren Star served as the patron of the festival edition.

The Best Series of the Festival award went to the Swedish crime drama Partisan.

== Juries ==
The following juries were named for the festival.

=== Competition ===
- Laëtitia Eïdo, French actress
- Grégory Fitoussi, French actor
- Randy Kerber, American composer
- Roxane Mesquida, French actress
- Caroline Proust, French actress and director
- Jean-Pascal Zadi, French actor and director

=== Short Form Competition ===
- Jamie Bamber, British actor
- Timothée Hochet, French director and screenwriter
- Erin Moriarty, American actress

== Official selection ==
=== In competition ===
The following series were selected to compete:

Title	Original title	Creator(s)	Production countrie(s)	Network
257 Reasons to Live	257 prichin chtoby zhit	Alexey Lyapichev	Russia	Start, TNT
Atlantic Crossing		Alexander Eik	Norway	NRK1
Cheyenne and Lola	Cheyenne et Lola	Virginie Brac	France, Belgium	OCS Max
Losing Alice	Le'abed et Alice	Sigal Avin	Israel	Hot 3, Apple TV+
Man in Room 301	Huone 301	—	Finland	Elisa Viihde
Moloch		Arnaud Malherbe	France	Arte
Partisan		Amir Chamdin & Fares Fares & Mauricio Molinari	Sweden	Viaplay
Red Light		Halina Reijn & Carice van Houten	Belgium, Netherlands	NPO 1, VTM
Top Dog		Jens Lapidus & Veronica Zacco	Sweden	ZDFneo, TV4
Truth Seekers		Nick Frost & Simon Pegg & Nat Saunders & James Serafinowicz	United Kingdom	Amazon Prime Video

=== Short Form Competition ===
The following series were selected to compete:

Title	Original title	Creator(s)	Production countrie(s)
Broder		Jonathan Barg & Mauro Pérez Quinteros & Andrés Sehinkman & Leandro Vital	Argentina
Christmas on Blood Mountain	Jul i Blodfjell	Lars Kristian Flemmen & Christopher Pahle & Martin Zimmer	Norway
Claire and the Elderly	Claire et les vieux	Patrick Bilodeau & Charles Grenier & Edith Morin & Sarah Pellerin	Canada
Cryptid		Daniel di Grado & Sylvain Runberg	Sweden
Deadhouse Dark		Enzo Tedeschi	Australia
Dog Days	Amours d'Occasion	Eva Kabuya	Canada
First Person		Renuka Jeyapalan & Tyler Levine & Patrice Theroux	Canada
Tony		Malena Filmus	Argentina
The Writers. A Short Series.	Pisarze. Serial na krótko.	Mikołaj Lizut	Poland
Zero Day		—	United States, France

=== Out of competition ===
The following series were screened out of competition:

Title	Original title	Creator(s)	Production countrie(s)	Network
Call My Agent! (season 4) (closing series)	Dix pour cent	Fanny Herrero	France	France 2
The Flame (opening series)	La Flamme	Florent Bernard & Jonathan Cohen & Jérémie Galan	France	Canal+
#FREERAYSHAWN		Marc Maurino	United States	Quibi
OVNI(s)		Clémence Dargent & Martin Douaire	France	Canal+
Shadowplay		Måns Mårlind	France, Canada, Germany	ZDF, Viaplay, Canal+, Canal+ Poland, NPO 1

== Awards ==
The following awards were presented at the festival:

- Best Series: Partisan by Amir Chamdin, Fares Fares and Mauricio Molinari
- Best Screenplay: Arnaud Malherbe and Marion Festraëts for Moloch
- Best Music: Jon Ekstrand and Carl-Johan Sevedag for Top Dog
- Special Interpretation Prize: Red Light by Halina Reijn and Carice van Houten
- Best Performance: Polina Maksimova for 257 Reasons to Live
- Student Prize: Red Light by Halina Reijn and Carice van Houten
- Best Short Form Series: Broder by Jonathan Barg, Mauro Pérez Quinteros, Andrés Sehinkman and Leandro Vital
- Short Form Prize: Claire and the Elderly by Patrick Bilodeau, Charles Grenier, Edith Morin and Sarah Pellerin

=== Special awards ===
The following honorary awards were presented at the festival:

- Variety Icon Award: Judith Light
- Madame Figaro Rising Star Award: Daisy Edgar-Jones
- Excellence Award: Patrick Dempsey
- Prix du Public: All the Way Up by Franck Gastambide
