= Text (film) =

2019 Russian film

- Theatrical release poster
- Directed by: Klim Shipenko
- Written by: Dmitry Glukhovsky
- Based on: Text (ru) by Dmitry Glukhovsky
- Produced by: Vadim Vereshchagin; Eduard Iloyan; Denis Zhalinskiy; Aleksey Trotsyuk; Vitaliy Shlyappo; Rafael Minasbekyan
- Starring: Alexander Petrov; Ivan Yankovsky; Kristina Asmus
- Cinematography: Andrey Ivanov
- Edited by: Tim Pavelko
- Music by: Ivan Burlyaev; Dmitriy Noskov; Nikolai Rostov
- Production companies: Central Partnership Productions; StartFilm
- Distributed by: Central Partnership
- Release dates: October 24, 2019 (Russia and Other countries)
- Running time: 132 minutes
- Country: Russia
- Language: Russian
- Budget: 75 million rubles ($1,181,000)
- Box office: $6,305,572

Text (Russian: Текст) is a 2019 Russian crime drama psychological thriller film directed by Klim Shipenko, an adaptation of the best-selling novel Text (2017) by writer Dmitry Glukhovsky, who adapted the novel into a movie script. The film stars Alexander Petrov, Ivan Yankovsky and Kristina Asmus.

Text was released in wide distribution in Russia on October 24, 2019. Having recouped its budget, the film achieved box office success and received generally positive reviews from Russian film critics. The film won four Golden Eagle Awards (2020) for Best Motion Picture, Best Leading Actor (Alexander Petrov), Best Supporting Actor (Ivan Yankovsky), and Best Film Editing. The film won the Nika Award for Best Screenplay (Dmitry Glukhovsky).

== Plot ==
The film tells the story of Ilya Goryunov, who ends up behind bars on a false charge. Once on the outside, he realizes that it is no longer possible to return to his former life for which he is so nostalgic and he decides to take revenge on the policeman whose fault it was that he ended up in prison. As a result of their meeting, Ilya ends up in possession of his enemy's smartphone and through a series of texts gradually takes his place.

== Cast ==
- Alexander Petrov as Ilya Goryunov
- Ivan Yankovsky as Pyotr Khazin
- Kristina Asmus as Nina, Pyotr's girlfriend
- Maksim Vinogradov as Seryoga, Ilya's friend
- Sofya Ozerova as Vera, Ilya's ex-girlfriend
- Sonya Karpunina as travel agent
- Kirill Nagiev as Gosha
- Tatiana Polosina as Stasya

== Production ==
=== Pre-production ===
The novel Text (ru) by Dmitry Glukhovsky, the author of the Metro book trilogy, was released in 2017 and was later translated into more than 20 languages. Within a week of the release of the book, Glukhovsky received about ten offers of a film adaptation, including from Alexander Rodnyansky and Timur Bekmambetov, who wanted to make a film in the screenlife genre. Offers also came from the United States, Italy and South Korea. On October 21, 2019, Glukhovsky said that in parallel with the Russian company, the rights to the film adaptation were bought by a film company from the United States.

=== Filming ===
At the start of filming, Dmitry Glukhovsky offered director Klim Shipenko a script of Text that he already had, to which the director asked for some adjustments. Due to a busy travel schedule, Glukhovsky managed to visit the film set just a few times. He repeatedly met with the director and talked with the actors about their roles and also played a cameo role as a metro passenger in the film.

Principal photography took place in January - March 2019. Instead of Lobnya, the town of Dzerzhinsky, Moscow Oblast was used for filming, also shooting took place in Moscow and the Maldives. Filming in the Goryunov apartment took place in an ordinary residential building. The scene in the sewer was filmed in a real sewer in Troparyovo-Nikulino District at a depth of about 10 meters. Scenes in the underground railway took place in the Moscow metro having negotiated official permission. Kristina Asmus also plays her heroine Nina in the eponymous production of the Yermolova Theatre.

Scenes on the streets, in the metro and on trains were shot without blocking off the area to ordinary passers-by and passengers - with the help of a half-hidden camera placed in an animal carrier.

Asked about his explicit sex scene with Kristina Asmus, Ivan Yankovsky said: "Yeah, we shot the footage ourselves. We drank wine, we clinked glasses, and started shooting. And it's always very funny. Because the director says to you, 'Come on!' and goes out the door to drink tea. And here you are, and she's here, and you have to shoot it all. And it's like she has a husband, out there in life, and he'll see everything. It's kind of creepy, really. But I understood: either you have to believe in it, or it makes no sense to do it."

=== Music ===
Basta (rapper), having watched Text, wrote the song It’s scary to live like this for the film, the director of the music video is Klim Shipenko. Alexander Petrov appears in the video in the image of Ilya Goryunov and performs the verse.

=== Accolades ===
The film Text received several award nominations.

Award	Category	Nominee(s)	Result
Honfleur Festival of Russian Cinema	Best script	Dmitry Glukhovsky	Won
Nika Award	Best Screenplay	Dmitry Glukhovsky	Won
Golden Eagle Award	Best Director	Klim Shipenko	Nominated
Golden Eagle Award	Best Actor	Alexander Petrov	Won
Golden Eagle Award	Best Supporting Actor	Ivan Yankovsky	Won
Golden Eagle Award	Best Music	Nikolay Rostov	Nominated
Golden Eagle Award	Best Film Editing	Tim Pavelko	Won
Golden Eagle Award	Best Feature Film	Text	Won
APKIT Awards	Best Feature Film	Text	Won
The Golden Unicorn Awards	Best Film	Text	Nominated
The Golden Unicorn Awards	Best Actor	Alexander Petrov	Nominated

== Release ==
The film was released in Russia by Central Partnership on October 24, 2019.
