= Naughty =

Naughty may refer to:

- Naughty (Chaka Khan album), 1980
- Naughty (Adamski album), 1992
- "Naughty" (Elen Levon song), 2011
- "Naughty" (Red Velvet – Irene & Seulgi song), 2020
- Naughty (1927 film), an American silent film starring Pauline Garon and John Harron
- Naughty (2023 film), a Russian erotic drama film

== See also ==
- Noughties, a slang name for the years 2000 to 2009
