= Infiltration (2022 film) =

- Directed by: Aleksey Chadov
- Written by: Aleksey Chadov
- Produced by: Sergey Selyanov; Sergey Perepechko; Pavel Popov; Andrey Rydanov; Elena Kozhanova; Elena Perepechko
- Starring: Aleksey Chadov; Vitali Kishchenko; Kristina Asmus; Viktor Sukhorukov; Dzhalil Asretov; Neviya Tafara; Ola Keyru; Nikita Kologrivyy
- Cinematography: Dmitry Karnachek
- Edited by: Serik Beiseu
- Music by: Sergey Luran
- Production companies: CTB Film Company; Film company "22"
- Distributed by: Nashe kino (Our Cinema)
- Release date: June 2, 2022 (Russia)
- Running time: 95 minutes
- Country: Russia
- Languages: Russian, Arabic, English
- Budget: ₽324.1 million
- Box office: ₽33.7 million

Infiltration (Russian: Своя война. Шторм в пустыне, lit. 'Its own war. Desert Storm') is a 2022 Russian war drama film written and directed by Aleksey Chadov also as the lead actor. It is the sequel to the 2002 film War.

This film was theatrically released on June 2, 2022, by "Nashe Kino" (transl. "Our Cinema").

== Plot ==
War is over. Ivan came home. But even years later, he continues to play it, as a result of which his wife left him. Ivan now a former soldier, sets off on a dangerous mission into Syria to save his ex-commander Gray after his capture by ISIS. With the help of U.S. military patrols, he succeeds in freeing Gray and attempts to escape the country while being hunted by terrorists. .

== Cast ==
- Aleksey Chadov as Ivan Yermakov
- Vitali Kishchenko as "Gray"
- Kristina Asmus as Alyona Yermakova, Ivan Yermakov's wife
- Viktor Sukhorukov as Ivanych
- Dzhalil Asretov as Zakir
- Neviya Tafara as a little local girl
- Ola Keyru as Steven, commander of the USMC
- Nikita Kologrivyy as Sergey "Artist"
- Alexander Krasovsky as Sergey "Vityaz"
- Petr Korolev as Max "Falcon"
- Sergey Borisov as Andrew "Commander"
- Eugenia Lezgintseva as Alyona's friend

== Production ==
The film companies "22" and "CTB" were engaged in production. The development was carried out with the support of the Cinema Fund.

The script began to be written in February 2019 after Aleksey Chadov attended events in Yekaterinburg dedicated to the work of Aleksei Balabanov and the film War (2002 film), which almost twenty years ago gave a powerful start to Chadov's career. The script writing process lasted two months, and principal photography began on July 29, 2020.

Principal photography process took place in Moscow and the Republic of Crimea, near Sudak, near Kapsel Bay near the art cluster "Tavrida", and Syria.
