= 2021 Canneseries =

2021 television festival

2021 Cannes International Series Festival
- Location: Cannes, France
- Founded: 2018
- Awards: Best Series (Mister 8)
- Festival date: 8–13 October 2021
- Website: canneseries.com/en

Canneseries
- 2022 2020

The 4th Cannes International Series Festival is a television festival that took place from 8 to 13 October 2021 in Cannes, France. It was scheduled to be held from 9 to 14 April but postponed due to COVID-19 pandemic-related concerns.

Finnish thriller comedy series Mister 8 won the Best Series award.

== Juries ==
The following juries were named for the festival:

=== Competition ===
- Nikolaj Coster-Waldau, Danish actor and screenwriter, Jury President
- Sigal Avin, American-Israeli screenwriter
- Naidra Ayadi, a French actress
- Salvatore Esposito, Italian actor
- Marco Prince, French composer

=== Short Form Competition ===
- Aisling Bea, Irish actress, Jury President
- Assaad Bouab, French-Moroccan actor
- Marie Papillon, French actress

== Official selection ==
=== In competition ===
The following series were selected to compete:

Title	Original title	Creator(s)	Production countrie(s)	Network
The Allegation	Glauben	Oliver Berben & Jan Ehlert	Germany	TVNow, VOX
Awake	Kljun	Srđan Dragojević	Serbia	Nova
Christian		Enrico Audenino & Valerio Cilio & Roberto Saku Cinardi	Italy	Sky Italia
Countrymen	Jordbrukerne	Izer Aliu & Anne Bjørnstad	Norway	Arte, NRK
Dreams of Alice	Сны Алисы	Anastasiya Volkova	Russia	TV-3
Limbo... Until It's Over	Limbo... Hasta que lo decida	Mariano Cohn & Gastón Duprat	Argentina	Star+
Mister 8		Teemu Nikki & Jani Pösö	Finland	Elisa Viihde
Sad City Girls	Yeladot Sach'sechaniot	Talya Lavie & Shir Reuven	Israel	Hot
Totems		Olivier Dujols & Juliette Soubrier	France	Amazon Prime Video
Unknowns	עלומים	Tawfik Abu-Wael & Guy Sidis & Nirit Yaron	Israel	Kan

=== Short Form Competition ===
The following series were selected to compete:

Title	Original title	Creator(s)	Production countrie(s)
About Saturday	Etter lørdag	Liv Mari Ulla Mortensen	Norway
Adi Shankar's The Guardians of Justice (Will Save You!)		Adi Shankar	United States, Spain, Finland
Dumped	Larguée	Kaycie Chase	France
Hudson Falls – A Ray McClane Mystery		Elias Plagianos	United States
i-ART		Alexandre da Silva & Marvin Gofin	France
Lockdown		Gilles Coulier & Maarten Moerkerke	Belgium
Pops	Батя	Artem Loginov & Anton Shchukin & Anton Zaitsev	Russia
Sheker		Arystan Kaunev & Kuat Sadykov	Kazakhstan
This Is Not a Hotel	Esto no es un hotel	Dana Crosa	Argentina
Wipe Me Away	Je voudrais qu'on m'efface	Eric Piccoli	Canada

=== Out of competition ===
The following series were screened out of competition:

Title	Original title	Creator(s)	Production countrie(s)	Network
All the Way Up (season 2) (opening series)	Validé	Giulio Callegari & Franck Gastambide & Xavier Lacaille & Charles van Tieghem	France	Canal+
Around the World in 80 Days		Ashley Pharoah & Caleb Ranson	France, United Kingdom	France 2, ZDF, RAI
Gomorrah (season 5) (closing series)	Gomorra - La serie	Roberto Saviano	Italy	Sky Atlantic
Sisi		Andreas Gutzeit & Robert Krause & Elena Hell	Germany	RTL

== Awards ==
The following awards were presented at the festival:

- Best Series: Mister 8 by Teemu Nikki and Jani Pösö
- Dior Grand Award: The Allegation by Oliver Berben and Jan Ehlert
- Best Screenplay: Ferdinand von Schirach for The Allegation
- Best Music: Giorgio Giampa for Christian
- Special Interpretation Prize: Countrymen by Izer Aliu and Anne Bjørnstad
- Best Performance: for Pekka Strang for Mister 8
- High School Prize for Best Series: Countrymen by Izer Aliu and Anne Bjørnstad
- Audience Award: Awake by Srđan Dragojević
- Best Short Form Series: About Saturday by Liv Mari Ulla Mortensen
- Dior Revelation Award for Best Short Form Series: Wipe Me Away by Eric Piccoli
- Student Prize for Best Short Form Series: Lockdown by

=== Special awards ===
The following honorary awards were presented at the festival:

- Variety Icon Award: Connie Britton
- Madame Figaro Rising Star Award: Phoebe Dynevor
- Konbini Prix de l'Engagement: Laurie Nunn
- Audience Award for French Series of the Year: Voltaire High
