= 257 Reasons to Live =

Russian television series

- Genre: Comedy drama
- Created by: Alexey Lyapichev; Yana Prokopenko; Mikhail Chistov
- Written by: Mikhail Belenkiy; Yury Belenkiy; Vartan Abramyan; Elizaveta-Varvara Aronova; Nikolay Muratov; Nataliya Kuznetsova; Korney Ratiev; Anastasia Baldina; Andrey Kosa; Vadim Sveshnikov (2020—)
- Directed by: Maxim Sveshnikov
- Starring: Polina Maximova; Egor Koreshkov; Darya Rudenok; Yulia Topolnitskaya; Anastasia Popova; Alexey Zolotovitskiy; Roman Mayakin; Mikhail Grishchenko; Alexander Sokolovskiy
- Composer: Mikhail Kadurin
- Country of origin: Russia
- Original language: Russian
- No. of seasons: 2
- No. of episodes: 26

Production
- Executive producer: Anna Dragunkina
- Producers: Vitaly Shlyappo; Eduard Iloyan; Alexey Trotsyuk; Denis Zhalinskiy; Ksenia Sobchak; Mikhail Tkachenko; Diana Tevosova; Alexey Lyapichev; Ivan Kanaev
- Production location: Moscow, Russia
- Cinematography: Ilya Averbakh; Fyodor Struchev (2020—)
- Editor: Andrey Belan
- Camera setup: Multi-camera
- Running time: 23 minutes
- Production companies: Yellow, Black and White (2019); SUPER Production (2019); START Studio (2020—)

Original release
- Network: START; TNT
- Release: March 26, 2020 – present

257 Reasons to Live (Russian: 257 причин, чтобы жить) is a Russian R-rated comedy-drama television series. The show is produced by Yellow, Black and White, Super Production and START Studio. Maxim Sveshnikov serves as director and Anna Dragunkina is an executive producer for the show.

The series stars Polina Maximova as Evgeniya Korotkova, a young woman who has defeated her cancer. Egor Koreshkov, Yulia Topolnitskaya, Maxim Lagashkin, Marusya Fomina and Roman Mayakin also star in the show. The series received a presentation pilot commitment at START in summer 2019. 257 Reasons to Live was ordered to series in July 2019. The series is primarily filmed in Moscow. "SUPER" renewed the series through its second season, principal photography began in July 2020 and wrapped in September.

The series debuted on START on March 26, 2020, the show had its TV premiere on TNT on June 8, 2020.

The second season of the series premiered on START on November 4, 2020.

== Premise ==
=== Season 1 ===
Thirty-year-old Zhenya recovers from cancer and finds her life in shambles. Her troubles just beginning, she discovers an old list in her diary of 257 things she had wanted to do if she lived that gives her a reason to go on.

=== Season 2 ===
Within a year, a new love appeared in Zhenya's life — Maxim, a beautiful and successful guy, whom she met in Bali and was going on a trip to Europe. Zhenya returns to Moscow to see her nephew and see her friends and does not plan to stay more than a couple of days. But unexpected circumstances will ruin all her plans.

Supportive Zhenya can not pass by the trouble and risks falling into the maelstrom of problems of her family and friends. In the life of Korotkova, all her past returns, including Konstantin. All this time, he kept Zhenya's notebook in the hope that her most important desire was connected with him. And Zhenya's father, who left the family many years ago, expects that his own daughters will accept him and take care of him. Sister Sonya, who, unlike Zhenya, is not ready to forgive her father, is ruining her successful blogger career and her family life with her own hands.

== Cast and characters ==
=== Main ===
- Polina Maximova as Evgeniya "Zhenya" Korotkova, a 30-year-old young woman who recovered from cancer.
- Egor Koreshkov as Konstantin "Kostya", a tennis coach.
- Darya Rudenok as Sofia "Sonya", Zhenya's younger sister, Ruslan's girlfriend.
- Yulia Topolnitskaya as Anna "Anya", a pregnant friend and colleague of Zhenya.
- Anastasia Popova as Irina "Ira", a friend and colleague of Zhenya
- Alexey Zolotovitskiy as Nikolay "Kolya" Muratov, a colleague of Zhenya.
- Roman Mayakin as Igor Sergeyevich, CEO of the company, Zhenya's chief.
- Mikhail Grishchenko as Ruslan "Rus", Sonya's boyfriend.
- Alexander Sokolovskiy as Maxim "Max", Zhenya's new boyfriend.

=== Recurring ===
- Maxim Lagashkin as Oleg, Kostya's friend.
- Asya Gromova as Daniella "Danya", Kostya's daughter.
- Marusya Fomina as Viktoria "Vika", a colleague of Kostya, his lover.
- Vitaliy Shcherbina as Nikita, Danya's boyfriend.

=== Guest ===
- Sergey Godin as Dmitry "Mitya", an ex-boyfriend of Zhenya, he is dating with Alisa.
- Anna Nevskaya as Alisa Yuryevna, Zhenya's oncologist, she is dating with Mitya.
- Kirill Nagiev as Artyom.

== Episodes ==
Season	Episodes	Originally released	
Season	Episodes	First released	Last released
1	13	March 26, 2019	June 11, 2020
2	13	November 4, 2020	January 21, 2021

=== Season 1 (2020) ===
No. overall	No. in season	Title	Directed by	Written by	Original release date
1	1	"Episode 1"	Maxim Sveshnikov	Unknown	March 26, 2020
Zhenya has been fighting for her life for several years. After defeating a deadly disease, she learns that no one needs her to be healthy. Well, let it be! Zhenya has 257 cherished wishes, it's time to make a wish come true.
2	2	"Episode 2"	Maxim Sveshnikov	Unknown	March 26, 2020
After the accident, Zhenya remembers that she lost her old notebook, where she were writing all her wishes during the illness. And Konstantin offers her his financial help.
3	3	"Episode 3"	Maxim Sveshnikov	Unknown	April 2, 2020
The desired guinea pig doesn't bring joy and it turns out that Zhenya has a strong allergy to it. She tries to hand over the guinea pig to one of the pet stores. But the Konstantin appears again.
4	4	"Episode 4"	Maxim Sveshnikov	Unknown	April 9, 2020
At the police Zhenya meets a downshifter and a traveler Artyom who offers her to start a new life and move to Bali. She seems to agree. In the evening she drives to the airport.
5	5	"Episode 5"	Maxim Sveshnikov	Unknown	April 16, 2020
Sonya needs to do a full medical examination, but she doesn't have enough money for a paid service and Zhenya promises to help Sonya. Zhenya decides to ask her cynical boss Igor Sergeyevich.
6	6	"Episode 6"	Maxim Sveshnikov	Unknown	April 23, 2020
Zhenya opens her notebook again, and now it's her turn to learn Spanish. She meets a native speaker, Alejandro, and he sets up a meeting in the park. At the same time Zhenya receives a call from the clinic.
7	7	"Episode 7"	Maxim Sveshnikov	Unknown	April 30, 2020
Danya accidentally found Znenya's pass in her father's car. It seems that Kostya should meet Zhenya again. But Zhenya does not think about Konstantin at all, she is attracted to Alejandro.
8	8	"Episode 8"	Maxim Sveshnikov	Unknown	May 7, 2020
After the stormy events of yesterday a tired Zhenya fell asleep right in Konstantin's car. She's upset that she never got to go on a date with Alejandro. But nothing can be done, now she needs to hurry to her job.
9	9	"Episode 9"	Maxim Sveshnikov	Unknown	May 14, 2020
Konstantin no longer hides that he wants to build a serious relationship with Zhenya. She also understands that a strong family relationship is what she needs, but nevertheless she does not want to rush things too much.
10	10	"Episode 10"	Maxim Sveshnikov	Unknown	May 21, 2020
It's time for a serious test for the senses and the best thing for this is to go on a joint journey. Moreover, this item in Zhenya's notebook is one of the most important.
11	11	"Episode 11"	Maxim Sveshnikov	Unknown	May 28, 2020
As expected there were some serious talks between Zhenya and Konstantin during the trip, but they managed to overcome it, and Zhenya believes that Konstantin is the man of her life.
12	12	"Episode 12"	Maxim Sveshnikov	Unknown	June 4, 2020
Zhenya continues to fulfill her desires, many of which seem stupid and frivolous to Konstantin. He wants a more harmonious relationship. But remembering what Zhenya went through, he gives in to her.
13	13	"Episode 13"	Maxim Sveshnikov	Unknown	June 11, 2020
Everything goes to the fact that Zhenya and Konstantin will create a new, strong family. But a calm, harmonious relationship can instantly collapse due to new, strange details from Zhenya's life. It turns out that Konstantin does not know her at all.

=== Season 2 (2020–21) ===
No. overall	No. in season	Title	Directed by	Written by	Original release date
14	1	"Episode 1"	Maxim Sveshnikov	Unknown	November 4, 2020
After a year at Bali, Zhenya returns to Moscow. She is waiting for a meeting with friends and family, and meets her father about whom she has not heard for a long time.
15	2	"Episode 2"	Maxim Sveshnikov	Unknown	November 4, 2020
Life presents the Korotkovys with new surprises. Zhenya is taken hostage through her father's fault, and Ksenia Sobchak herself crosses the road to Sonya.
16	3	"Episode 3"	Maxim Sveshnikov	Unknown	November 12, 2020
Sometimes love brings only disappointment, but Zhenya always supports her friends in a difficult moment. And Kostya will support Zhenya... or rather, her father.
17	4	"Episode 4"	Maxim Sveshnikov	Unknown	November 19, 2020
Passions heat up. Max vs Kostya, Sonya vs Sobchak. Who will win? It's up to Zhenya.
18	5	"Episode 5"	Maxim Sveshnikov	Unknown	November 26, 2020
Leave or stay? If Zhenya hesitates, someone else will make the choice for her. And this someone else clearly plays with fire.
19	6	"Episode 6"	Maxim Sveshnikov	Unknown	December 3, 2020
Truth or hype? Not everyone believes Sonia's words. But Zhenya does not believe his good fortune, she finds out that she might be pregnant.
20	7	"Episode 7"	Maxim Sveshnikov	Unknown	December 10, 2020
While someone hatches plans, the other takes it and does it. There appeared a buyer for the Korotkovys' apartment, but Zhenya's problems are not getting any less.
21	8	"Episode 8"	Maxim Sveshnikov	Unknown	December 17, 2020
Things we do for love. Some change their image, others succumb to training. But there are also those who are ready to openly admit their feelings.
22	9	"Episode 9"	Maxim Sveshnikov	Unknown	December 24, 2020
If you can't change something, change your attitude to it. But Max doesn't want to leave the final word to his opponent. And what does Zhenya want?
23	10	"Episode 10"	Maxim Sveshnikov	Unknown	December 31, 2020
Zhenya takes the situation into her own hands. If everyone is behaving like children, then the questions should be solved in a childish way!
24	11	"Episode 11"	Maxim Sveshnikov	Unknown	January 7, 2021
You can do anything for your loved ones. To arrange a holiday, to forget about the silly insults and talk about their feelings. But a lie can ruin everything.
25	12	"Episode 12"	Maxim Sveshnikov	Unknown	January 14, 2021
The stakes are higher than ever. While Zhenya's father goes all-in for the good of the family, her friends play their own game. Whose strategy will be more successful?
26	13	"Episode 13"	Maxim Sveshnikov	Unknown	January 21, 2021
Zhenya thinks of others like a true Cinderella. And she risks being left without a dress and a happy ending to her fairy tale.

== Awards and nominations ==
In 2021, the second season of the series won the Russian National Web Industry Awards for Best Streaming Series (less than 24 minutes).

The series was selected for the official competition of the 3rd Cannes International Series Festival. Lead actress Polina Maksimova won the Canneseries Award for Best Performance at the 2020 festival for her role in the series.

== Release ==
257 Reasons to Live premiered on the streaming service START on March 26, 2020. START releases 257 Reasons episodes on a weekly basis.

The series had its TV premiere on TNT on June 8, 2020.

The first two episodes of the second season premiered on START on November 4, 2020.
