= 2018 Canneseries =

2018 television festival

2018 Cannes International Series Festival
- Location: Cannes, France
- Founded: 2018
- Awards: Best Series (When Heroes Fly)
- Festival date: 4–11 April 2018
- Website: canneseries.com/en

Canneseries
- 2019

The inaugural edition of Cannes International Series Festival is a television festival that took place from 4 to 11 April 2018 in Cannes, France. Danish actress Sidse Babett Knudsen served as the patron of the festival edition.

Israel-Colombian drama series When Heroes Fly won the Best Series of the festival.

== Juries ==
The following juries were named for the festival.

=== Competition ===
- Harlan Coben, American writer, Jury President
- Paula Beer, German actress
- Audrey Fouché, French director and screenwriter
- Melisa Sözen, Turkish actress
- Cristobal Tapia de Veer, Chilean-Canadian composer
- Michael K. Williams, American actor

=== Short Form Competition ===
- Adi Shankar, American actor
- Jessica Barden, English actress
- Ed Solomon, American screenwriter and director

== Official selection ==
=== In competition ===
The following series were selected to compete:

Title	Original title	Creator(s)	Production countrie(s)	Network
Cacciatore: The Hunter	Il Cacciatore	Silvia Ebreul & Marcello Izzo & Alfonso Sabella	Italy	Rai 2
Félix		Cesc Gay	Spain	Movistar Plus+
Here on Earth	Aquí en la Tierra	Gael García Bernal & Jorge Dorantes & Kyzza Terrazas	Mexico	Fox Premium Latin American
Killing Eve		Phoebe Waller-Bridge	United Kingdom	BBC America
Miguel		Daphna Levin & Tom Salama	Israel	Hot 3
Mother	마더	Jee-young Park	South Korea	tvN
State of Happiness	Lykkeland	Mette Marit Bølstad & Siv Rajendram Eliassen & Synnøve Hørsdal	Norway	NRK1
The Typist	Die Protokollantin	Nina Grosse	Germany	ZDF
Undercover		Nico Moolenaar	Belgium, Netherlands	Eén
When Heroes Fly	בשבילה גיבורים עפים	Omri Givon	Israel, Colombia	Keshet 12

=== Short Form Competition ===
The following series were selected to compete:

Title	Original title	Creator(s)	Production countrie(s)
The Arena	L'Arène	Marjorie Armstrong	Canada
Atropa		Eli Sasich	United States
Bite Size Horror		—	United States
Bonding		Rightor Doyle	United States
Cabeza Madre		Édouard Salier	Cuba, France
Camionero		Jacques Toulemonde	Colombia, France
Dominos		Zoé Pelchat	Canada
If I Were You	Si fueras tú	Javier Olivares & Javier Pascual & Annaïs Schaaff	Spain
Immature		Sameer Saxena	India
Memento Mori		Lee Young-sook	South Korea

=== Out of competition ===
The following series were screened out of competition:

Title	Original title	Creator(s)	Production countrie(s)	Network
Safe (closing series)		Harlan Coben	United Kingdom	C8, Netflix
The Truth About the Harry Quebert Affair (Official Competition opening series)		—	United States, Canada	Epix
Versailles (season 3) (opening series)		Simon Mirren & David Wolstencroft	France, Canada, United Kingdom, United States	Canal+

== Awards ==
The following awards were presented at the festival:

- Best Series: When Heroes Fly by Omri Givon
- Best Screenplay: Mette Marit Bølstad for State of Happiness
- Best Music: Ginge Anvik for State of Happiness
- Special Interpretation Prize: Miguel by Daphna Levin and Tom Salama
- Best Performance: Francesco Montanari for Cacciatore: The Hunter
- Best Short Form Series: Dominos by Zoé Pelchat

=== Special award ===
The following honorary award was presented at the festival:

- Variety Icon Award: Michelle Dockery
