= Start (streaming service) =

Subscription-based international streaming service

- Company type: LCC
- Website type: subscription-based streaming service
- Founded: 2017
- Founders: Eduard Iloyan, Vitaliy Shlyappo, Alexey Trotsyuk, Denis Jalinskiy
- Key people: Julia Mindubaeva, Eduard Iloyan, Vitaliy Shlyappo, Alexey Trotsyuk, Denis Jalinskiy, Irina Sosnovaya, Klim Shipenko
- Industry: Tech & Entertainment, mass media
- Products: Streaming media video on demand
- Website: start.ru

Start is a subscription-based international streaming service available worldwide with Russian-based production. The service is a part of START digital media holding that also includes production company Start, and distribution company All Media.

START Originals includes world-renowned projects 257 Reasons to Live (Beta Film, 2020 Canneseries Best Performance Award, 2020 Rose D’Or Finalist), Russian Affairs/Gold Diggers. Another START Original sci-fi hit Better than Us after its premiere on Start became the first Russian production to be dubbed into 20+ languages and secured a Netflix Original status. Some of the series are currently being sold as formats for local adaptation abroad.

== History ==
Start was founded in 2017 by the producers of Yellow, Black and White — Eduard Iloyan, Vitaliy Shlyappo, Alexey Trotsyuk, Denis Jalinskiy. The company produces content in partnership with Disney Russia and other major distributors. As of August 2019 START had subscribers in 174 countries, 40% outside CIS. In October 2020 Start announced it had over 1 million paying subscribers.

Since April 2021 Start has been a part of so named digital media holding. Start holding also includes a production studio Start Studio that handles all rights to its original series, and a feature film distribution company All Media.

== Finance ==
According to one of the founders, Eduard Iloyan, total investment amounted to 2,3–2,4 billion rubles (over 36 millions $) at the end of 2019.

According to Telecom Daily and TMT Consulting reports, for two years in a row Start shows the fastest finance growth among streaming services in Russia, occupying 6% of the SVOD market.

== Content ==
Over the past three years Start produced in-house more than 30 originals, including series Gold Diggers (3 seasons), Better than Us (1 season), Storm (1 season), Addicted (3 seasons), The Vampires of Midland, Mediator (2 seasons), Passengers, Container, Offside (2 seasons), The Counted (2 seasons), 257 Reasons to Live (2 seasons), A Good Man (1 season), Sherlock: The Russian Chronicles, and films Hotel Belgrade, The Factory by Yury Bykov, Text by Klim Shipenko etc. In 2019 Start original series Better Than Us became the first Russian TV series released worldwide as a Netflix Original. It was dubbed into 20+ languages.

In 2020 Amazon Prime bought exclusive distribution rights for Gold Diggers (season 1) as Exclusives and Originals after its release on Start. In 2020, Start signed a two-year distribution deal with the international streaming platform Walter Presents. As part of the agreement, a curated selection of international drama series was made available to Russian audiences, including Professor T, Fugitives, Kepler(s), Stalk, Box 21, Young and Promising, Klem and Code 37: Sex Crimes. In the same year, Walter Presents licensed Gold Diggers for release in the United Kingdom. In 2021, Walter Presents acquired rights to another Start production, the nine-part psychological thriller A Good Man.

As of May 2021 Start had over 50 projects in production.

== Awards and nominations ==
Start original series Storm by Boris Khlebnikov won a silver award at the New York Festivals TV and Film Awards in the Streaming Drama category. Text by Klim Shipenko won The François Chalais Prize at the annual Festival du Cinéma Russe à Honfleur (2019) for Best Script (Dmitry Glukhovskiy) and Best Actor (Alexander Petrov and Ivan Yankovskiy). The film won four Golden Eagle Awards (2020) for Best Motion Picture, Best Leading Actor (Alexander Petrov), Best Supporting Actor (Ivan Yankovsky), and Best Film Editing.
