= Mister 8 =

2021 Finnish comedy–drama television series

- Genre: Comedy drama
- Created by: Teemu Nikki; Jani Pösö
- Written by: Vesa Virtanen; Teemu Nikki
- Directed by: Teemu Nikki
- Starring: Pekka Strang; Krista Kosonen
- Composers: Timo Kaukolampi; Tuomo Puranen
- Country of origin: Finland
- Original language: Finnish
- No. of episodes: 8

Production
- Producer: Jani Pösö
- Running time: 24–33 minutes
- Production company: It's Alive Films

Original release
- Network: Elisa Viihde Viaplay
- Release: 31 January 2021

Mister 8 is a Finnish eight-part comedy drama series directed and co-written by Teemu Nikki with Vesa Virtanen, based on an idea by Nikki and Jani Pösö. All episodes were released on Elisa Viihde Viaplay on 31 January 2021.

== Cast ==
- Pekka Strang as Juho
- Krista Kosonen as Maria
- Chike Ohanwe as Pelle
- Amir Escandari as Darius
- Elias Westerberg as Terho
- Ville Tiihonen as Sepe
- Joonas Saartamo as Vertti
- Jari Virman as Hermanni
- Olli Rahkonen as Tuukka
- Matti Onnismaa as Pietari
- Jouko Puolanto as Veikko Bergholm
- Hannamaija Nikander as Jenny
- Hannes Suominen as Mica
- Joel Hirvonen as Jussi
- Petra Heinänen as Ida
- Topi Patjas as Ville
- Rafael Airaksinen as Oliver
- Essi Patrakka as Adele
- Samuli Jaskio as Ilpo
- Marjaana Maijala as a therapist
- Rebecca Viitala as Marika
- Maija Rissanen as Sanna

== Plot ==
The series is follows Maria, who has seven dates – one for each day of the week - until the eighth man, Juho, affects her relationships. Juho wants Maria to himself and tries to get the other men out of the arrangement.

== Production ==
Mister 8 was produced by Jani Pösö, Laura Kuulasmaa of Elisa Viihde, and Maria Sekikirkina. The series was shot in black-and-white because Nikki wanted to "create a unique universe" and make it "stand out from the crowd". Principal photography took place during the autumn of 2019 and filmed in Helsinki.

== Episodes ==
The English titles are from SBS On Demand.

No.	Title	Directed by	Written by	Original release date
1	"I Wish Everybody Could Be Monday" (Finnish: Miksei aina voi olla maanantai?)	Teemu Nikki	Teemu Nikki, Jani Pösö, Vesa Virtanen	31 January 2021
2	"Testosterone Tuesday" (Finnish: Testotiistai)	Teemu Nikki	Antero Jokinen, Teemu Nikki, Jani Pösö	31 January 2021
3	"Poetic Thursday" (Finnish: Runollinen torstai)	Teemu Nikki	Teemu Nikki, Jani Pösö, Vesa Virtanen	31 January 2021
4	"Fishy Wednesday" (Finnish: Muikunmakuinen keskiviikko)	Teemu Nikki	Teemu Nikki, Jani Pösö, Vesa Virtanen	31 January 2021
5	"Comedy Friday" (Finnish: Komediaperjantai)	Teemu Nikki	Teemu Nikki, Jani Pösö, Vesa Virtanen	31 January 2021
6	"Sysma Saturday" (Finnish: Sysmäläinen lauantai)	Teemu Nikki	Teemu Nikki, Jani Pösö, Vesa Virtanen	31 January 2021
7	"Cabin Sunday" (Finnish: Mökkisunnuntai)	Teemu Nikki	Teemu Nikki, Jani Pösö, Vesa Virtanen	31 January 2021
8	"The Battle Over Weekdays" (Finnish: Taistelu viikonpäivistä)	Teemu Nikki	Teemu Nikki, Jani Pösö, Vesa Virtanen	31 January 2021

== Release ==
All episodes were released on Elisa Viihde Viaplay on 31 January 2021.

== Reception ==
Pramit Chatterjee of High On Films wrote a positive review about Mister 8 for being outside the norm of traditional romance stories, and how it tackles polyamory.

J.A. Kaunisto of Mesta.net wrote that the series is "strange and distortorted" but also "teasing and thought-provoking" and gives "pointed underlines and painful observations about the behaviour of city people of the 21st century" while Nikki and co-writer Vesa Virtanen do not provide explanations.

== Accolades ==
Mister 8 won or was nominated with the following rewards:

Award	Date of Ceremony	Category	Recipient(s)	Result	Ref.
Canneseries	8–13 October 2021	Best Series	Mister 8	Won	
Canneseries	8–13 October 2021	Best Performance	Pekka Strang	Won	
Golden Venla Awards	7 May 2022	Best Comedy Series	Mister 8	Nominated	
Golden Venla Awards	7 May 2022	Best Actor	Pekka Strang	Nominated	
