= 2019 Canneseries =

2019 television festival

2019 Cannes International Series Festival
- Location: Cannes, France
- Founded: 2018
- Awards: Best Series (Perfect Life)
- Festival date: 5–10 April 2019
- Website: canneseries.com/en

Canneseries
- 2020 2018

The 2nd Cannes International Series Festival is a television festival that took place from 5 to 10 April 2019 in Cannes, France.

The closing ceremony was hosted by French comedian Monsieur Poulpe and aired live on Canal+. Spanish comedy series Perfect Life won the Best Series of the festival.

== Juries ==
The following juries were named for the festival. English actor Stephen Fry was set to jury the competition section but withdrew his participation.

=== Competition ===
- Baran bo Odar, German director and screenwriter, Jury President
- Miriam Leone, Italian actress
- Emma Mackey, French-British actress
- Katheryn Winnick, Canadian actress
- Robin Coudert, French composer

=== Short Form Competition ===
- Greg Garcia, American director and producer, Jury President
- Fanny Sidney, French actress
- Josefine Frida Pettersen, Norwegian actress

== Official selection ==
=== In competition ===
The following series were selected to compete:

Title	Original title	Creator(s)	Production countrie(s)	Network
Bauhaus: A New Era	Die Neue Zeit	Lars Kraume	Germany	Arte
The Feed		Channing Powell	United Kingdom	Virgin TV
How to Sell Drugs Online (Fast)		Philipp Käßbohrer & Matthias Murmann	Germany	Netflix
Junichi	潤一	Mitsunobu Kawamura & Eiji Kitahara & Hirokazu Kore-eda	Japan	Kansai TV
Magnus		Vidar Magnussen	Norway	NRK1
Nehama	נחמה	Reshef Levi	Israel	Hot
The Outbreak	Эпидемия	Pavel Kostomarov	Russia	TV-3
Perfect Life	Déjate Llevar	Leticia Dolera	Spain	Movistar Plus+
Studio Tarara		Tim van Aelst	Belgium	VTM
The Twelve	De twaalf	Sanne Nuyens & Bert van Dael	Belgium	Eén

=== Short Form Competition ===
The following series were selected to compete:

Title	Original title	Creator(s)	Production countrie(s)
Do Not Disturb		Michael Haussman & Larry Volpi	United Kingdom
The Fucking Liars	Los mentirosos	Alejandro Jovic	Argentina
Golden Revenge		Josh Gardner & Tom Stern	United States
La Maison des Folles		Mara Joly	Canada
Noche de Amor		Agustina Levati & Pedro Levati	Argentina
Over and Out		Christiaan Van Vuuren & Adele Vuko	Australia
Robbie Hood		Tanith Glynn-Maloney & Dylan River	Australia
Simone & moi, une amitié mécanique		Laurène Dervieux & Soukaïna Meflah	France
Teodor pas de H		Nathalie Doummar & Julien Hurteau	Canada
Warigami		Eddie Kim	Canada

=== Out of competition ===
The following series were screened out of competition:

Title	Original title	Creator(s)	Production countrie(s)	Network
Beecham House		Paul Mayeda Berges & Gurinder Chadha & Shahrukh Husain	United Kingdom	ITV
NOS4A2		Jami O'Brien	United States	AMC
Now Apocalypse		Gregg Araki	United States	Starz
The Rook		Stephen Garrett & Karyn Usher & Lisa Zwerling	United Kingdom	Starz
Vernon Subutex (opening series)		Cathy Verney	France	Canal+
Years and Years		Russell T Davies	United Kingdom	BBC One

== Awards ==
The following awards were presented at the festival:

- Best Series: Perfect Life by Leticia Dolera
- Best Screenplay: Bert Van Dael and Sanne Nuyens for The Twelve
- Best Music: Christoph M. Kaiser and Julian Maas for Bauhaus: A New Era
- Special Interpretation Prize: Perfect Life by Leticia Dolera
- Best Performance: Reshef Levi for Nehama
- Best Short Form Series: Over and Out by Christiaan Van Vuuren and Adele Vuko

=== Special awards ===
The following honorary awards were presented at the festival:

- Variety Icon Award: Diana Rigg
- Serieously Award: Lindsey Morgan
- Excellence Award: Dominic West
