= Alexander Petrov (actor) =

Russian film and television actor

- Александр Петров
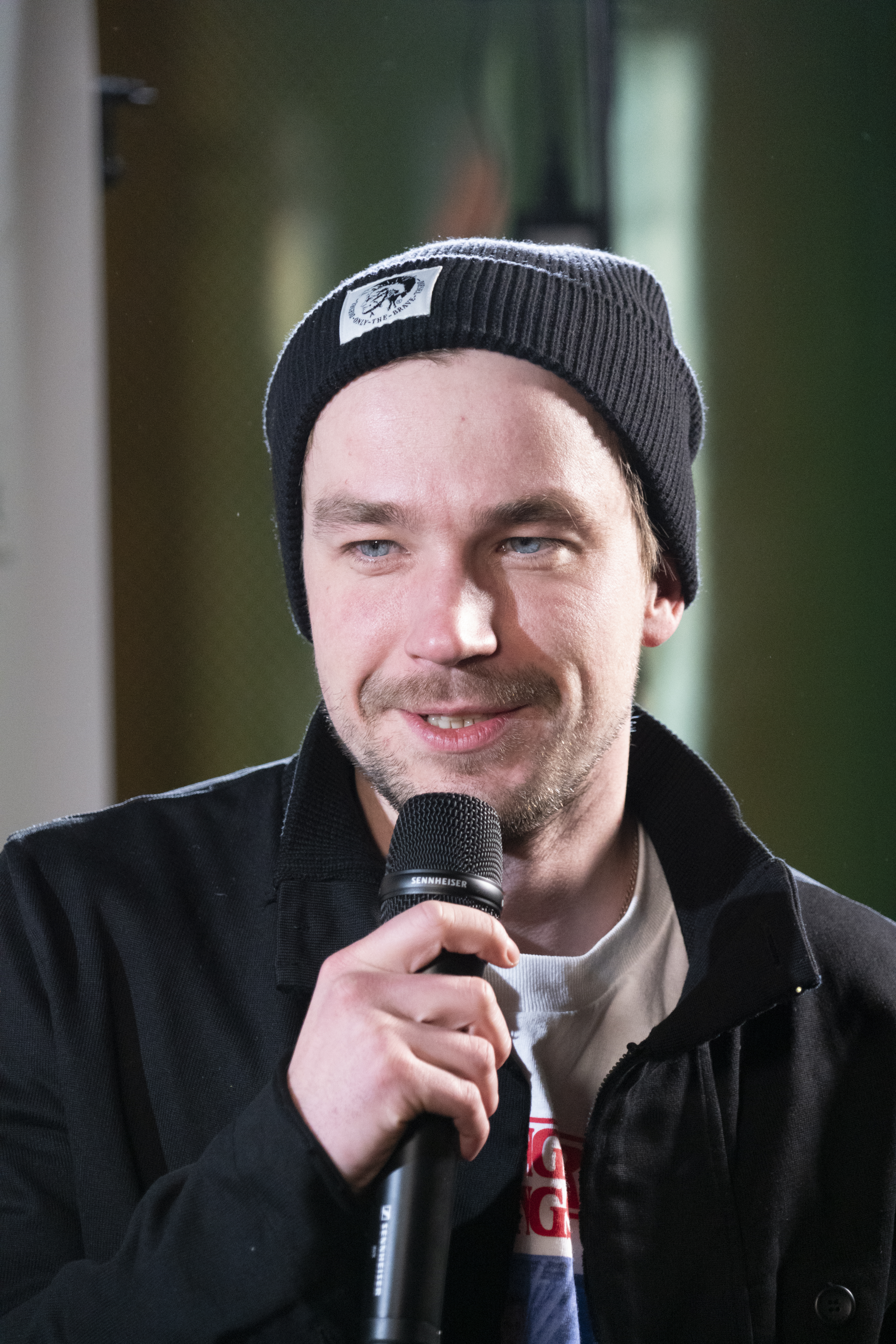
- During an interview at Russian Film Week USA in December 2019
- Born: Alexander Andreevich Petrov; 25 January 1989 (age 37); Pereslavl-Zalessky, Yaroslavl Oblast, RSFSR, USSR
- Education: Russian Institute of Theatre Arts
- Occupation: Actor
- Years active: 2010–present
- Employer: Yermolova Theatre
- Website: sashapetrov.ru

Alexander Andreevich Petrov (Russian: Александр Андреевич Петров, romanized: Aleksandr Andreyevich Petrov; born 25 January 1989) is a Russian actor, known for his roles in T-34 (2019), Attraction (2017) and Gogol. The Beginning (2017).

== Early life ==
Petrov was born in Pereslavl-Zalessky, Yaroslavl Oblast, Russian SFSR, Soviet Union (now Russia).

He loved football since childhood, and at the age of 9 was admitted into the children's section of the local football club. His sporting successes were significant, and at the age of fifteen, he was invited to train in Moscow. He was already preparing to leave when he became seriously injured - a mountain of bricks collapsed on him during school summer practice. He received a severe concussion, after which doctors prohibited him from sports.

After school, he entered the economic department of the University of Pereslavl at the Institute of Program Systems of the Russian Academy of Sciences. However, he soon realized that this was not for him - when he began to participate in the student team of the KVN and the performances of the theatre (also student) "Entreprise".

During the theatrical festival, he took part in the master classes of teachers of the Russian Institute of Theatre Arts - GITIS and made his final choice. In 2008, he left the university and went to Moscow. From his first attempt, he managed to enter the GITIS for the directing department in the workshop of L. Kheifets.

In 2012-2013, Alexander served in the Moscow Theatre "Et Cetera". Based on the results of diploma theatricals, he received an offer from Aleksandr Kalyagin about enrollment in the troupe of the Moscow theatre "Et Cetera". He played Graziano in "Shylock" based on William Shakespeare's play "The Venetian Merchant", directed by Robert Sturua.

In 2013, he was admitted to the troupe of the Yermolova Theatre, under the leadership of Oleg Menshikov. In the Yermolova Theatre, he played Hamlet in William Shakespeare's tragedy, directed by Valeriy Sarkisov.

== Acting career ==
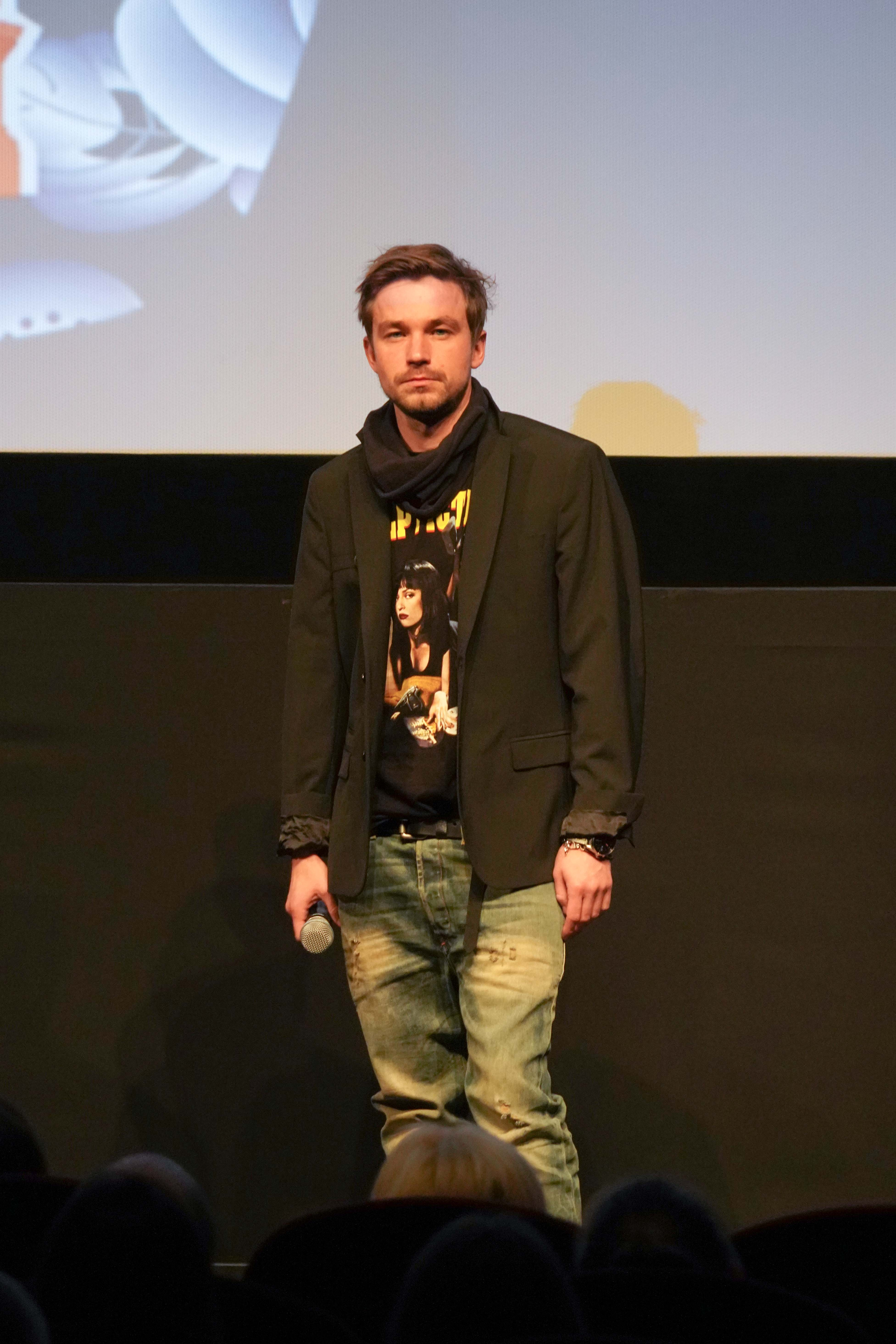
Alexander Petrov at Russian Film Week USA in December 2019

Petrov made his debut in 2010 in an episodic role of the television series Voices. In 2012, he played a major role in the series While the fern is blooming.

In the 2015 crime drama serial The Method produced by Alexander Tsekalo's Sreda, Petrov played the supporting role of police officer Zhenya. In the same year he also acted in the TV series Fartsa, by the same production company, this time in the lead role. The series is about Fartsovka — the illegal acquisition of consumer goods and currency from foreigners during the Soviet Union. He played Andrei Trofimov, an aspiring writer. In 2017, he acted in Sreda's feature film — Gogol. The Beginning. In this horror-fantasy picture, loosely based on Evenings on a Farm Near Dikanka, he portrayed writer Nikolai Gogol.

He played one of the main roles in the disaster-film Attraction (2017) by Fyodor Bondarchuk. According to the plot of the film; over the city there is an unidentified object, which later, for the safety of citizens, is shot down. Only when it falls to the ground do experts find that this object is of unearthly origin.

In 2018, he acted in the musical romantic drama about figure skating, Ice.

Film news and database website Kinopoisk named Alexander Petrov as the most popular Russian actor of 2017.

He again played the role of Artyom in Invasion, the sequel of Attraction in 2020.

== Filmography ==
=== Film ===
List of film credits
Year	Title	Role	Notes
2012	August Eighth	Yashka, tank commander	
2013	The Habit of Parting	Denis	
2013	Yolki 3	Slavik	
2014	Love in Vegas	Artyom Isaev Jr.	
2014	Fort Ross: In Search of Adventure	Kryukov	(ru)
2015	Happiness is...	Artyom	
2015	Elusive: The Last Hero	The Avenger	(ru)
2016	Sheep and Wolves	Grey	Voice
2016	Vera's Gift	Anton	Short
2017	Attraction	Artyom 'Tyoma' Tkachyov	
2017	Gogol. The Beginning	Nikolai Gogol	
2017	Partner	Khromov in the body of the baby	(Motion capture)
2017	Mind Battle	Aleks	(ru)
2018	Ice	Alexander Arkadyevich 'Sasha' Gorin, a hockey player	
2018	Gogol. Viy	Nikolai Gogol	
2018	Gogol. Terrible Revenge	Nikolai Gogol	
2018	The Day Before	Roma	
2018	Policeman from Rublyovka. New Year Mayhem	Grisha Izmaylov	
2019	T-34	Nikolay Ivushkin	
2019	Anna	Piotr	
2019	Hero	Andrey Rodin	
2019	Text	Ilya Goryunov	
2020	Invasion	Artyom 'Tyoma' Tkachyov	
2020	Ice 2	Alexander Arkadyevich 'Sasha' Gorin	
2020	Winter	Maks	
2020	Streltsov	Eduard Streltsov	
2021	Man of God (film)	Kostas	produced by Yelena Popovic
2023	Naughty	Matvey Rysak	
2023	The Palace	Anton	
2024	Ice 3	Alexander Arkadyevich 'Sasha' Gorin	
2024	One Hundred Years Ahead	Jolly Man U, a space pirate	
2025	Vasily	Vasily / Nikolai, twin brother	
2025	Kraken	Viktor Voronin	
TBA	December	Sergei Yesenin	
2026	Kommersant	Andrei Rubanov	

=== Television ===
List of television credits
Year	Title	Role	Notes
2010	Voices	Leha	12th and 13th series
2012	Marina Grove	Igor Spiridonov	9th series. "Cards"
2012	While the Fern is Blooming	Kirill Andreev	
2013	Without the right to choose	Lyokha	
2013	Petrovich	Denis Volkovskiy	Film 3. Volk
2013	Second wind	Ilya	
2014	Embracing the Sky	Vanya Kotov	
2015	Fartsa	Andrei Trofimov	(ru)
2015	The Law of the Concrete Jungle	Vadik	(ru)
2015	The Method	Zhenya	
2016	You All Infuriate Me	Mark	(ru)
2016	Policeman from Rublyovka	Grisha Izmaylov	(ru)
2016	Mata Hari	Mateu	
2016	Drunken firm	Grigoriy Shtuchnyy	(ru)
2017	Policeman from Rublevka 2	Grisha Izmaylov	
2017	You All Infuriate Me	Mark Kalinin	
2018	Sparta	Mikhail Barkovskiy	
2019	Belovodie. The Mystery of a Lost Country	Kirill Andreev	(ru)
2025	Kambek	Kompot	
2022	In Two	Sanya	
