= On the Nameless Height =

- Written by: Yuriy Chernyakov
- Directed by: Vyacheslav Nikiforov
- Starring: Viktoriya Tolstoganova; Aleksey Chadov; Vladimir Yaglych; Alexander Pashutin
- Countries of origin: Russia; Belarus
- Original language: Russian

Production
- Producer: Ruben Dishdishyan
- Running time: 196 minutes

Original release
- Release: 8 March 2004

On the Nameless Height (Russian: На безымянной высоте, romanized: Na bezymyannoy vysote) also known in English as On an Unnamed Hill and Unidentified Heights, is a Russian-Belarusian 2004 television film in four parts, set in 1944 in the Second World War.

== Plot ==
The location is the Belarusian forests, close to the Polish border, during Operation Bagration in the summer of 1944. After a short pause, the Red Army is preparing to advance, but on one segment of the front there are two serious obstacles: an unnamed hill with unknown German strength, and a highly skilled German sniper, who is killing off not only Russian officers, but also all captured German officers before they can be interrogated. Because of this, the local commander, Major Inozemtsev, suspects that the hill is a trap, which the Germans are very eager to keep a secret.

A female specialist sniper, Olga Pozdneyeva (Viktoriya Tolstoganova) arrives to eliminate the German sniper. On the same lorry with reinforcements are the carefree ex-convict soldier Kolya Malakhov, the new lieutenant for the unit's reconnaissance platoon, Alexey Malyutin, and the platoon's very experienced staff sergeant, Ivan Bessonov, who is returning after a spell in hospital.

Eventually, Kolya is assigned to be Olga's assistant, and he immediately falls in love with her although she tries to keep a professional distance due Olga's previous experiences with the difficulty of sustaining a relationship in a combat zone. Katya Solovyova, the battalion HQ radio operator quickly identifies Lieutenant Malyutin as her love interest, later revealed to have been foretold in a fortune-telling seance, and they are quickly attracted to each other.

While the deadline for the offensive is drawing closer, the reconnaissance platoon continues to try to kidnap German officers for interrogation, Olga plays a cat and mouse game with the German sniper, and everyone is trying to avoid the fanatical SMERSH officer, Captain Shulgin, who suspects everyone of being a German spy or saboteur. Although Olga finally succeeds in killing the German sniper, they still don't know if the hill is a trap, so on the day of the offensive, the reinforced reconnaissance platoon is ordered to take the hill before more troops are committed. They all know it's a suicide mission where all or most are going to die.

== Main cast ==
- Viktoriya Tolstoganova - Olga, a sniper
- Aleksey Chadov - Kolya Malakhov, private
- Vladimir Yaglych - Alexey Malyutin, lieutenant
- Andrey Golubev - Major Inozemtsev
- Anatoly Kot - Captain Shulgin, SMERSH
- Alexander Pashutin - Ivan Bessonov, staff sergeant
- Anna Kazyuchits - Katya Solovyov, telephone operator

== Performances ==
Viktoriya Tolstoganova looks obviously older than her eventual love interest Alexey Chadov. However, her performance is unaffected by this and is superfluous as a professional sniper she depicts (matching the age to a sports champion description), and a combat veteran contrasted with other female roles in the film that all have relationships with officers, something she cannot afford. Another noted performance is that of Anatoly Kot whose depiction of a faithful security SMERSH operatchik is flawless, as is his portrayal of a mental 'release' that ends in his suicide. Alexey Chadov's role is overly exuberant given the circumstances.

== Production ==
Production sought to portray front-line life of combat troops in the Red Army as authentically as possible, and mostly succeeds. Problems do arise though, such as the seeming disordered slaughter of Soviet troops by a German machine-gun position at the start of the film. Though dramatic, it is highly unlikely in 1944, as is the likelihood of German troops remaining deep in the Soviet rear as suicide squads. There is a further implausibility of a former convicted criminal being accepted into a reconnaissance squad, and his love pursuit of a sniper who is his ranking senior, and also a clearly older woman. Snipers usually worked in pairs, but certainly a selection of a complete novice for a partner on missions would have been suicidal for Olga, as it nearly proved to be for Kolya. The plan to send a reconnaissance squad reinforced to a platoon to attack German positions in daylight is completely ahistorical and atypical of Red Army tactics, particularly where two former members of the Russian Liberation Army were available as guides through the minefields, offering a chance of surprise no Red Army officer would ever neglect to use to its best effect.

== See also ==
- The Star, a Russian film from 2002 which also describes the activities of the Red Army scouts during Operation Bagration
