= You All Infuriate Me =

- Genre: Sitcom
- Written by: Ekaterina Sazonova; Dmitry Minaev; Svetlana Fedotova; Anastasia Kasumova; Anna Simikina; Larisa Kletsova; Timur Ezugbai; Yurii Mikulenko; Dmitry Grigorenko; Yuri Kostyuk; Dmitry Kozlov; Yury Poimanov; Alexander Bragin
- Directed by: Oleg Fomin; Mikhail Savin
- Starring: Svetlana Khodchenkova; Yuliya Topolnitskaya; Aleksandr Pal; Alexander Petrov; Pyotr Fyodorov; Yuri Kolokolnikov; Yuri Chursin; Igor Petrenko
- Country of origin: Russia
- Original language: Russian

Production
- Executive producer: Gulya Islamova
- Producers: Ekaterina Sazonova; Dmitry Minaev; Svetlana Fedotova; Anastasia Kasumova; Anna Simikina; Larisa Kletsova; Timur Ezugbai; Yurii Mikulenko; Dmitry Grigorenko; Yuri Kostyuk; Dmitry Kozlov; Yury Poimanov; Alexander Bragin
- Running time: 24 minutes
- Production companies: Look Film; Drive Production

Original release
- Network: STS
- Release: 9 January – 2 February 2017

You All Infuriate Me (Russian: Вы все меня бесите, romanized: Vy vse menya besite) is a Russian TV series which debuted in 2017 on the STS channel.

== Plot ==
Sonia Bagretsova is a restaurant reviewer in the famous magazine NOWADAYS in the city of Yekaterinburg. She is a misanthrope who is annoyed by everything and gets into arguments with anyone who crosses her path. Sonia does not know strong friendship nor true love.

One day Sonya visits the opening of one restaurant and treats herself to an alcoholic drink which causes her to become more sociable. This causes her personal life to change dramatically: the journalist gains a lover and two friends.

== Cast ==
- Svetlana Khodchenkova as Sonia Bagretsova / Sofya
- Yuliya Topolnitskaya as Nelya Suslova / Ninel
- Aleksandr Pal as Vova / Vladimir
- Alexander Petrov as Mark Kalinin
- Pyotr Fyodorov as Kirill Vitalievich
- Yuri Kolokolnikov as Artem
- Yuri Chursin as Alexander
- Igor Petrenko as Nikita
