= Yuliya Topolnitskaya =

Russian theater and film actress

- Юлия Топольницкая
- Born: Yuliya Nikolaevna Topolnitskaya; 2 May 1991 (age 35); Leningrad, RSFSR, USSR
- Occupation: Actress
- Years active: 2014–present
- Spouse: Igor Chekhov

Yuliya Nikolaevna Topolnitskaya (Russian: Ю́лия Никола́евна Топольни́цкая; born 2 May 1991) is a Russian theater and film actress. She gained fame in January 2016 when she appeared in the music video "Экспонат" (Exhibit) for the Russian band "Leningrad".

== Biography ==
Yuliya Topolnitskaya was born in Leningrad, Russian SFSR, Soviet Union (now Saint Petersburg, Russia). Her father Nikolay was an entrepreneur and mother, Nadezhda, was a doctor who worked in an orphanage. Yulia's mother wanted her to become a ballerina and for 12 years sent her to a ballet school. "But with the ballet it did not work out for me", - said the actress. Then the parents tried to push the girl into music - they bought her a piano. However, Yuliya did not like this hobby: she did not want to play the piano, and only used it as a shelf for her toys.

In 2014 she graduated from the Russian State Institute of Performing Arts, a workshop of Boris Uvarov. Since 2014 she has been working at the St. Petersburg Clownery Theater "Litsedei". In 2015, she participated with Aleksey Shamutilo in the project "Comedy Battle", but the pair finished on the second round.

== Music videography ==
Exhibit (a.k.a. Louboutins), uploaded on YouTube on January 13, 2016, received 32 million views in three weeks. As of January 2018 the video has 120 million views. In the role of the main protagonist, the actress Topolnitskaya is preparing to go to a date at the art exhibition with "Sergei". She has only a couple of hours to get ready which includes losing weight, squeezing into skinny jeans, shaving, putting on make-up and getting a manicure. The music video is best known for Topolnitskaya painting the soles of her friend's borrowed shoes red, to make them as similar as possible to those of Christian Louboutin.

The song won the "Best Music Video" at the Russian National Music Awards.

She also later starred in the Leningrad music videos "Сиськи" (Tits) 2016 and "Кольщик" (Kolshchik) (2017).

== Career ==
Since 2012, she appears in the movies. Some of the pictures with her include Peppers, The Glowing Perimeter (2014), Police Station (2015).

Her first major role was in the comedy series You All Infuriate Me (2017). Her heroine is the talkative manicurist Nelya Suslova. According to the plot of the film, she is a close friend of the journalist of the popular city newspaper Sonia Bagretsova, whose role is performed by Svetlana Khodchenkova. During the filming, Yuliya and Svetlana became very friendly.

In 2017, Julia Topolnitskaya became a new participant in the comedy show "Once Upon a Time in Russia" on TNT. Also, together with the regular participant of the show Azamat Musagaliyev, they have recorded several duets.

== Personal life ==
On July 6, 2016, she married comedian Igor Chekhov, resident of "Comedy Club".

== Filmography ==
- 2012 Peppers as Katya
- 2014 The Glowing Perimeter (mini-series) as Natasha
- 2014 Gunner (mini-series) as Oksana, Sipitsyn's wife
- 2014-2015 Alien nest (TV Series) as Klara
- 2015 Police Station (TV Series) as Skvortsova
- 2017 You All Infuriate Me (TV Series) as Nelya Suslova
- 2020 257 Reasons to Live (TV series)
- 2021 Girls Got Game as Alina
- 2022 Rolls as Olya
- 2023 Off the Rails as Kazakova
