= Beau Brummell: This Charming Man =

- Acorn Media DVD Cover
- Genre: Historical drama
- Written by: Simon Bent
- Directed by: Philippa Lowthorpe
- Starring: James Purefoy; Hugh Bonneville; Phil Davis; Matthew Rhys; Ian Kelly
- Composer: Peter Salem
- Country of origin: United Kingdom
- Original language: English

Production
- Executive producer: Richard Fell
- Producer: David Edgar
- Cinematography: Graham Smith
- Editor: Dave Thrasher

Original release
- Network: BBC Four
- Release: 20 December 2006

Beau Brummell: This Charming Man is a 2006 BBC Television drama based on the biography of Beau Brummell by Ian Kelly. The title references a 1983 song by The Smiths.

== Production ==
The film was commissioned by BBC Four for broadcast as part of its 2006 The Century That Made Us season.

== Reception ==
Nancy Banks-Smith writing in The Guardian said the film "was exquisite to see and very easy to enjoy," stating that "it was one of those plays where the director of photography and the costume and set designers, who normally bring up the rear, led the whole parade." She also compliments Hugh Bonneville for his "frighteningly feasible Prince Regent." She concludes that "the Georgians had a natural beauty in their lives which makes ours seem ugly."

Jodie Pfarr writing in The Sydney Morning Herald describes the film as "an engaging costume drama romp" which provides "a fascinating account of the relationship between Brummell and the prince." He calls the show "Queer Eye for the Straight Guy 18th-century style," and concludes that "the moral of the story is all can be fine and dandy until you tell someone they're fat."

== Synopsis ==
Brummell shares an intimate moment with Prince George while advising him on his wedding outfit (which is incorrectly shown in the film as a ceremonial dress) and, invites him to dinner along with his friends. He is appointed as royal sartorial advisor by the newly dandified Prince and all debts of his are dropped as word of his new position is spread. He and the Prince become close friends drinking and gambling in the clubs of London straining his finances and relations with others.

Brummell's relationship with the Prince is strained as his fame begins to spread. He becomes enamoured with the dangerous Lord Byron against the warnings of the Prince further straining their relationship. He ignores a summons from the Prince to enjoy the favours of Miss Julia along with Byron. His manservant Robinson is forced to intervene when the Prince and Byron go head-to-head.

Brummell's loss of royal favour leaves him outcast and indebted as the bailiffs begin to turn violent. He takes out a large loan with some close associates and even steals from Robinson but quickly gambles it all away. A disgraced and equally destitute Byron returns to London but the two fall out. Unable to pay back the loan he is expelled from his club, abandoned by Robinson, and forced to flee to France.

== Cast ==
- James Purefoy as Beau Brummell
- Hugh Bonneville as Prince Regent
- Phil Davis as Robinson
- Elliot Levey as Tailor
- John Telfer as Fop
- Tim Hudson as Fop
- Zoe Telford as Julia
- Justin Salinger as Richard Meyler
- Nicholas Rowe as Lord Charles Manners
- Ian Kelly as Lord Robert Manners
- Jonathan Aris as Marquis of Worcester
- Daniel Fine as Cloth Merchant
- Nick Richards as Snuff Merchant
- Anthony Calf as Duke of York
- Matthew Rhys as Lord Byron
- Rebecca Johnson as Duchess of York
- Max Gell as Palace Footman
- Howard Coggins as Edward

== Sources ==
The film is based on the 2005 biography Beau Brummell: The Ultimate Dandy by Ian Kelly who also appeared in the film.

=== Selected editions ===
- Kelly, Ian (10 October 2005). Beau Brummell: The Ultimate Dandy. Hodder & Stoughton (hardcover). ISBN 978-0-340-83698-9.
- Kelly, Ian (29 June 2006). Beau Brummell: The Ultimate Dandy. Hodder Paperbacks (paperback). ISBN 978-0-340-83699-6.
