= Aleksey Chadov =

Russian actor (born 1981)

- Алексе́й Ча́дов
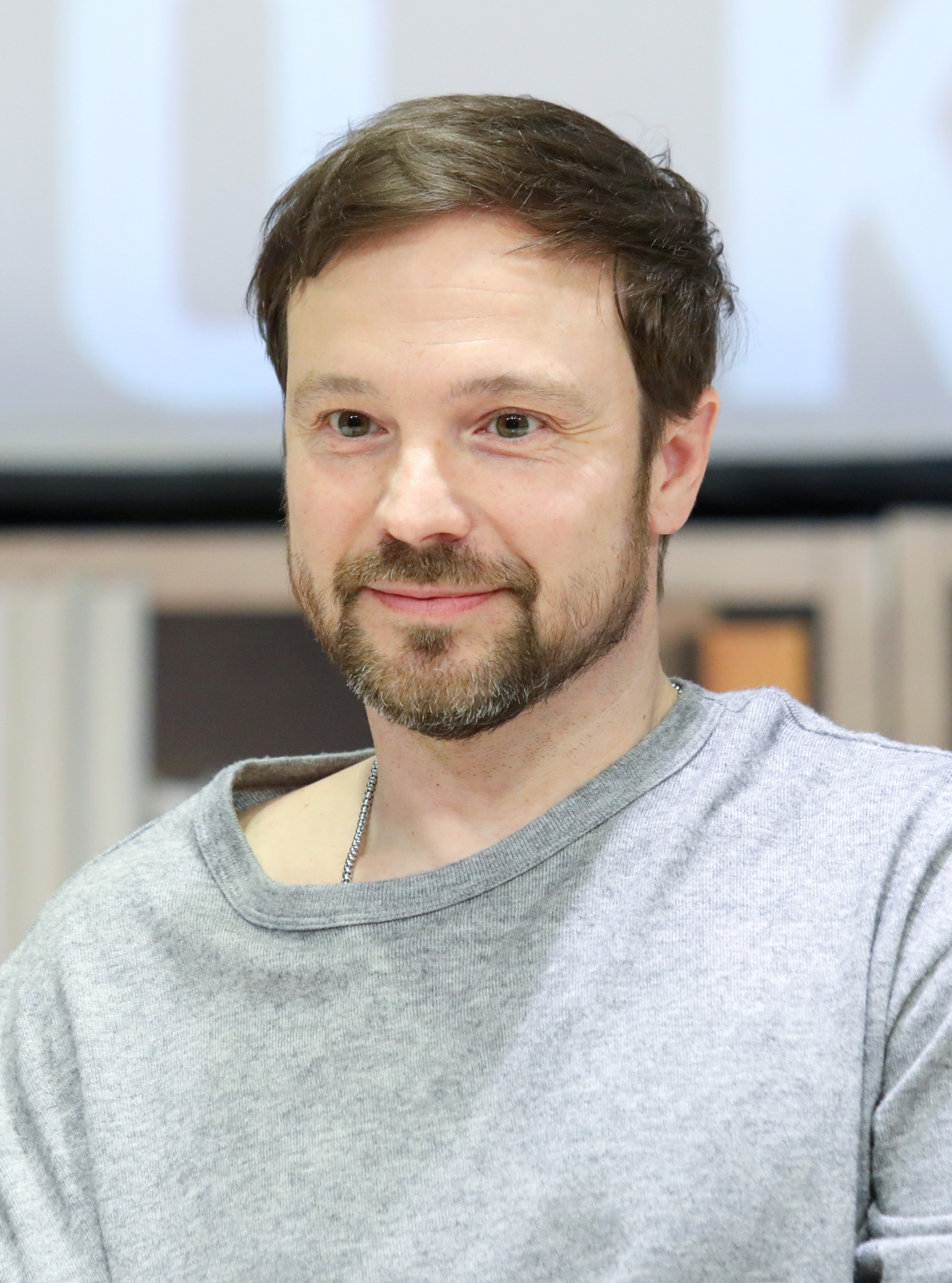
- Aleksey Chadov
- Born: Aleksey Aleksandrovich Chadov; 2 September 1981 (age 44); Solntsevo, Moscow Oblast, Russian SFSR, Soviet Union (now Moscow, Russia)
- Education: Mikhail Shchepkin Higher Theatre School
- Occupations: Actor; film director
- Years active: 2002–present
- Spouse: Agnia Ditkovskyte (2012–15)
- Children: 1
- Relatives: Andrei Chadov (brother)

Aleksey Aleksandrovich Chadov (Russian: Алексе́й Алекса́ндрович Ча́дов; born 2 September 1981) is a Russian actor and film director. Younger brother of actor Andrei Chadov.

== Career ==
Chadov made his film debut in the film War (2002) by director Aleksei Balabanov. In 2002, he received the Best Actor Award at the Montreal World Film Festival.

Soon after he starred as Kolya Malakhov in the film On the Nameless Height. In 2003, Chadov was invited by film director Andrei Proshkin to play the main role in the drama Moths Games. Also in 2003, he played a role in the blockbuster Night Watch directed by Timur Bekmambetov.

Chadov also acted in films The 9th Company, Heat, and in the Love in the City trilogy. He has also starred alongside his brother in films such as 2006's Alive.

In 2022 he made his directorial debut with Infiltration in which he also starred.

In 2025, his second film ((Ne) iskusstvennyy intellekt) was released.

== Selected filmography ==
Film
Year	Title	Role	Notes
2025	Kambek	Dron	
2022	Infiltration	Ivan	also Director
2019	The Blackout	Oleg	
2016	Versus	Victor	
2014	A Matter of Honor	Ivan	TV series
2014	Viy	Petrus	
2014	Love in the Big City 3	Artyom	
2011	SLOVE. Soldiers of Love (SLOVE: Прямо в сердце)	Ronin	
2010	Love in the Big City 2	Artyom	
2009	Love in the Big City	Artyom	
2007	OrAngeLove	Roman	
2006	Day Watch	Kostya Saushkin	
2006	Alive	Kir	
2006	Heat	Aleksey	
2005	The 9th Company	Private Volodya "Vorobey" Vorobiyev	
2004	Night Watch	Kostya Saushkin	
2003	Moths Games	Kostya	
2003	On the Nameless Height	Kolya Malakhov	
2002	War	Ivan Yermakov	
