= Ian Kelly (actor) =

British writer and actor (born 1966)

Ian Francis Kelly (born 16 January 1966) is a British writer and actor. His works include historical biographies, stage and screenplays.

== Early life ==
Born in Cambridge, England, in 1966, Kelly is the second son of Professor Donald Kelly and Patricia Ann Kelly. He was brought up in Philadelphia, Bristol, and the Wirral. Kelly studied at the University of Cambridge and UCLA Film School.

== Playwright ==
Kelly's play Mr Foote's Other Leg, directed by Sir Richard Eyre and starring Simon Russell Beale, opened at Hampstead Theatre in 2015 before transferring directly into the West End, Theatre Royal Haymarket, playing 2015–2016.

== Acting ==
On film, Kelly played Hermione Granger's father in Harry Potter and the Deathly Hallows – Part 1. On stage, he appeared in The Pitmen Painters at the National Theatre, on Broadway and in the West End, and in A Busy Day, also in the West End. He acted on London's West End and in New York in his own one-man plays and also in the title role in the US premiere of Ron Hutchinson's Beau Brummell. He was nominated for Best Actor for his work in Tom Stoppard's Arcadia (Manchester Drama Awards). For his work in Alexei Balabanov's Voyna (War) he was nominated for Best Actor at the Montreal World Film Festival. In 2015 he played George III in the premiere production of his own play Mr Foote’s Other Leg.

== Historian and Biographer ==
Kelly has published biographies of Antonin Carême (2004), Beau Brummell (2005), Casanova (2008), and Samuel Foote (Mr. Foote's Other Leg, 2012). His biography of Vivienne Westwood, written with Dame Vivienne, was published in October 2014.

== Adaptations ==
The BBC Television drama Beau Brummell: This Charming Man with Hugh Bonneville and Phil Davis was based on Ian Kelly's biography. His biography of Giacomo Casanova was read by Benedict Cumberbatch on BBC Radio 4 in 2008 as a Book of the Week abridged by Amber Barnfather, repeated on BBC Radio 4 Extra, then published by BBC Worldwide as an audio book in May 2015. He wrote the scenario of Casanova for a 2017 ballet choreographed by Kenneth Tindall for Northern Ballet which was also performed at Sadler's Wells Theatre.

Carême, an adaptation of Cooking for Kings: The Life of Antonin Carême, The First Celebrity Chef, was released on Apple TV+ in 2025.

== Awards ==
The Society for Theatre Research awarded Mr. Foote's Other Leg the STR Theatre Book Prize in 2013. His biography of Beau Brummell was shortlisted for the Marsh Biography Award. His biography of Casanova was the Sunday Times biography of the year in 2008.

== Journalism ==
Kelly has written for most of the British broadsheets and The New York Times. He is a contributing editor of Food Arts Magazine.

== Television ==
As an actor his TV work includes Dennis Potter's Cold Lazarus Drop the Dead Donkey, Silent Witness, Just William, Catherine Cookson's The Moth, Sensitive Skin, and Time Trumpet.

== Film ==
Kelly has acted in many films including The Children Act, Closed, Creation, Merchant-Ivory's Howards End, Richard Attenborough's In Love and War, The Mission, The King's Man and the Russian films Admiral and Aleksei Balabanov's War.

== Bibliography ==
- Kelly, Ian (25 September 2003). Cooking for Kings: The Life of the First Celebrity Chef. Short Books, London (hardcover). ISBN 978-1-904095-20-0.
- Kelly, Ian (10 October 2005). Beau Brummell: The Ultimate Dandy. Hodder & Stoughton (hardcover). ISBN 978-0-340-83698-9.
- Kelly, Ian (26 June 2008). Casanova: Actor Lover Priest Spy. Hodder Paperbacks (hardback). ISBN 978-0-340-92214-9.
- Kelly, Ian (11 October 2012). Mr Foote's Other Leg; Comedy, Tragedy and Murder in Georgian England. Picador PanMacmillan, London (hardcover). ISBN 978-0330517836.
