= Kommersant (film) =

- Directed by: Fyodor Kravchuk; Nikita Kravchuk
- Written by: Fyodor Kravchuk; Nikita Kravchuk
- Based on: Plant, and It Will Grow by Andrei Rubanov
- Produced by: Vladimir Malyshev; Ivan Golomovzyuk; Pyotr Todorovsky; Svetlana Oleynikova; Maksim Filatov; Ilya Burets; Irina Shcherbovich-Vecher; Igor Mishin; Alexander Petrov; Arpine Khachyan; Liya Rakhmatullina; Yuliana Mitrofanova; Emilia Nebozhenko; Stepan Lupanov; Vladimir Vasilyev; Alexander Grokholsky; Ksenia Savich; Ekaterina Kit; Ekaterina Ishkova; Ksenia Mazalova; Irina Zernova; Igor Korotkov; Dmitry Antimonov; Andrey Sereda
- Starring: Alexander Petrov; Elizaveta Bazykina; Mikhail Troinik; Nikita Pavlenko; Husky; Artur Ivanov; Ivan Fominov; Ramil Sabitov; Aleksandr Kudin; Karen Badalov
- Cinematography: Semyon Kretov
- Edited by: Artyom Grebnev
- Music by: Kazi; Vladimir Sudakov
- Production companies: Gonzo Film; ON Studio; ON Media; KION; Gerasimov Institute of Cinematography (VGIK); NTV
- Distributed by: Nashe Kino
- Release date: April 23, 2026 (Russia)
- Running time: 96 minutes
- Country: Russia
- Language: Russian
- Box office: ₽497 million

Kommersant (Russian: Коммерсант), also known as The Hustler or by its working title Plant, and It Will Grow, is a 2026 Russian crime drama film directed and written by Fyodor Kravchuk and Nikita Kravchuk. The screenplay is based on Andrei Rubanov's best-selling autobiographical novel of the same name, Plant, and It Will Grow. Starring Alexander Petrov, Elizaveta Bazykina, Mikhail Troinik, Nikita Pavlenko, and Husky. The soundtrack for the film was written by Kazi and Vladimir Sudakov. Semyon Kretov was the film's cinematographer.

This film was theatrically released on April 23, 2026, by Nashe Kino (English: Our Cinema).

== Plot ==
The film takes place in Moscow in 1996. It follows a young and enterprising banker named Andrei Rubanov is riding a wave of success: he has a beautiful young wife, Irma, a small child, and over a million dollars in capital between him and his close friend, Mikhail Moroz. Seeing themselves as the future elite of the new state and true oligarchs, the friends engage in a major deal. However, it soon becomes clear that they have become involved in a massive fraudulent scheme to embezzle billions from the state treasury.

After his arrest, Andrei finds himself in an overcrowded general cell at the Matrosskaya Tishina pretrial detention center. Having hit rock bottom, he is forced to endure harsh trials, rethinking his values and relationships. Prison becomes a kind of purgatory for him, where he must become a completely different person in order to survive and maintain his humanity so he can return to his family.

== Cast ==
- Alexander Petrov as Andrei Rubanov, banker (also tr. Andrey Rubanov)
- Elizaveta Bazykina as Irma, Andrei Rubanov's wife
- Mikhail Troinik as Mikhail Moroz, Andrei Rubanov's friend and partner
- Nikita Pavlenko as Johnny
- Husky as Slava
- Artur Ivanov as Khvatov
- Ivan Fominov as Slon
- Ramil Sabitov as Babay
- Aleksandr Kudin as Lomov

== Production ==
The film is an adaptation of Andrei Rubanov's autobiographical novel, Plant, and It Will Grow, which was published in 2005 and won the National Bestseller Award in 2006. Rubanov himself was involved in business in the 1990s and was arrested in 1996 on fraud charges, spending several years in prison before his acquittal in 1999.

The film marked the feature-length debut of the directing duo, brothers Fyodor and Nikita Kravchuk, who also wrote the screenplay. They previously collaborated on the TV series "Friendzone." Adapting the novel into a screenplay took them over a year.

=== Casting ===
The lead actor, Alexander Petrov, also became the project's creative producer.

== Release ==
The film Kommersant was released in Russia on April 23, 2026, by Nashe Kino Film Distribution. Following its theatrical release, the film will be available on the Kion online cinema.
