= Hero (2019 Russian film) =

2019 action thriller film directed by Karen Oganesyan

- Domestic Theatrical release poster
- Directed by: Karen Oganesyan
- Screenplay by: Nikolay Kulikov
- Produced by: Karen Oganesyan; Polina Ivanova; Artyom Grigoryev
- Starring: Alexander Petrov; Svetlana Khodchenkova; Vladimir Mashkov; Konstantin Lavronenko
- Cinematography: Yuriy Korobeynikov
- Edited by: Maksim Urmanov
- Music by: Roman Selivyorstov
- Production companies: Russia-1; Kargo Film
- Distributed by: Central Partnership; VGTRK; All Media Company
- Release date: September 26, 2019
- Running time: 120 minutes
- Country: Russia
- Language: Russian
- Budget: 250 million rubles
- Box office: 178 043 638 rubles

Hero (Russian: Герой, trans. Geroj or Geroy) is a 2019 Russian spy action comedy film directed by Karen Oganesyan. It stars Alexander Petrov as Andrey Rodin, a Russian spy who was forced to back to action after years away from his homeland. The film also features Svetlana Khodchenkova, Vladimir Mashkov and Konstantin Lavronenko.

The shooting took 47 shifts, from April to June 2018. In addition, several scenes needed to be completed within a year due to the schedules of the leading actors. The film was shot in the cities of Riga, Jurmala, and Sigulda, Latvia, in the Republic of Crimea and the Kaliningrad Oblast, Russia.

Hero was released on September 26, 2019 in Russia by Central Partnership.

== Plot ==
15 years after the closing of a project involving a training school for teenagers by the Foreign Intelligence Service (SVR) in which Andrey Rodin was enrolled, he now lives in a European city no longer remembering Russia.

One day he receives a call from his father, who is considered dead and informs him that he is open for hunting. Rodin also is told that unknown services are trying to find and eliminate him and that his only option is escape. Led by the goal of surviving and finding his presumed dead father, Andrey begins involving himself further into the espionage business, not realizing the true scale and danger of it all.

== Cast ==
- Alexander Petrov as Andrey Olegovich Rodin, Russian spy, Oleg Rodin's son of a scout, mnemonics.
  - Yan Alabushev as Young Andrey Rodin
- Svetlana Khodchenkova as Mariya "Masha" Rakhmanova, Andrey Rodin's love interest, scout.
- Vladimir Mashkov as Oleg Rodin, Andrey Rodin's father, Former SVR Colonel, curator of the intelligence school "Youth".
- Konstantin Lavronenko as Maksim Mikhailovich Kataev, SVR officer
- Marina Petrenko as Zotova, operations officer from the headquarters of the SVR in Moscow.
- Anastasiya Todoresku as Helena Burger, SVR agent
- Tobias Aspelin as Mark Polson, a wealthy US businessman
- Aaryaman Patnaik as Aary, an Indian tourist

== Production ==
=== Filming ===
Filming began in April 2018 and took place in Europe, Kaliningrad and Moscow. Actors had to perform stunts on the ground, in water and in the air. In one scene, the heroes fly off a balloon in wingsuits (winged overalls), and in another they jump from the roof of a 27-story skyscraper.

== See also ==
- List of films featuring surveillance
