= The Ex List =

- Genre: Fantasy; Comedy drama
- Based on: The Mythological X by Sigal Avin
- Developed by: Diane Ruggiero
- Starring: Elizabeth Reaser; Rachel Boston; Adam Rothenberg; Alexandra Breckenridge; Amir Talai
- Composer: Mateo Messina
- Country of origin: United States
- Original language: English
- No. of seasons: 1
- No. of episodes: 13 (9 unaired)

Production
- Executive producers: Sigal Avin; Avi Nir; Mosh Danon; Jonathan Levin; Diane Ruggiero
- Producer: Jimmy Simons
- Production locations: San Diego, Ocean Beach and Los Angeles, California
- Camera setup: Single-camera setup
- Running time: 47 minutes
- Production companies: Keshet; Banana Goose Productions; Table Six Productions; 20th Century Fox Television

Original release
- Network: CBS
- Release: October 3 – October 24, 2008

The Ex List is an American comedy-drama television series based on the Israeli series The Mythological X created and written by Sigal Avin. The Americanized version, developed by Diane Ruggiero, premiered on CBS on October 3, 2008. Avin and Ruggiero acted as executive producers with Jonathan Levin, Avi Nir, and Mosh Danon. The series aired on Global in Canada and on Canal Fox on Latin America. The show was short-lived due to poor ratings and reviews, and lasted less than a month, with less than half of the produced episodes airing.

== Premise ==
After a psychic tells her she's already dated her future husband, a woman explores all her past relationships to determine who it was. According to the prediction, she will remain single for the rest of her life unless she locates him within a year.

== History ==
All 13 episodes of The Ex List were scheduled to air on Channel 10 in Australia over the summer non-ratings period of 2008-09 at 9:30 p.m. on Mondays, however after two episodes the series was pulled due to low ratings. Army Wives, the series which preceded it, was bumped back to the 9:30 p.m. slot and repeats of Law & Order: Criminal Intent began airing at 8:30 p.m. However, after these changes ratings did not improve. The series was also dubbed in French and was called Bella et ses ex. The series started airing on Series Plus, June 1, 2009 in Canada, Mondays at 10 p.m. The series is also still being aired on Canal Plus Fox in Spain with the title Todos mis novios. All 13 episodes were available to buy on demand at Amazon.com and iTunes for USA residents, however they have since been pulled and Amazon.com now says the series is unavailable due to their license having expired.

== Production ==
The series was shot on location in the Ocean Beach and Coronado communities of San Diego, California, as well as along Seacoast Drive in Imperial Beach, California.

On September 12, 2008, creator and executive producer/head writer Diane Ruggiero quit the series after being unable to reach an agreement with CBS over the direction of the show. Six episodes of the show had been filmed before Ruggiero departed. Executive producer Rick Eid had taken over show runner duties to finish the 13-episode order, but the series was cancelled after only four episodes aired. All 13 episodes were completed, despite cancellation of the series during production.

== Cast ==
- Elizabeth Reaser as Bella Bloom
- Rachel Boston as Daphne Bloom
- Alexandra Breckenridge as Vivian
- Mark Deklin as Elliott
- Adam Rothenberg as David "Augie" Augustine
- Amir Talai as Cyrus
- Anne Bedian as Marina the Psychic
- Josh Braaten as Marty (Daphne's husband)

=== The Exes ===
- Eric Balfour as Johnny Diamont (Episode 01: Pilot)
- Eric Winter as Jake Turner (Episode 02: Climb Every Mountain Biker)
- Michael Weaver as Ronny (Episode 03: Protect And Serve)
- Brian Van Holt as Shane Gallagher (Episode 04: Do You Love Me, Do You Surfer...Boy)
- Michael Landes as Josh Dubinsky (Episode 05: Momma's Boy)
- Reid Scott as Steve Bolla (Episode 06: Daphne's Idealized Wedding)
- Kevin Sorbo as Professor Harris Bertram (Episode 07: Art Professor)
- Josh Cooke as Luke Crane (Episode 08: Trustafarian)
- James Tupper as DP (Episode 09: Flower King)
- Ben Weber as James Thorp (Episode 10: The Spark)
- Josh Stamberg as Wade Redden (Episode 11: The Babysitter)
- Kristoffer Polaha as Philip Emmerson (Episode 12: Metro Guy and the Non Ex)
- Michael McLafferty as Roy Avis (Episode 13: The Other Foot)
- Melanie Specht as Tessa (Episode 13: The Other Foot)

== Episodes ==
No. overall	No. in season	Title	Directed by	Written by	Original release date	Prod. code
1	1	"Pilot"	Timothy Busfield	Diane Ruggiero-Wright	October 3, 2008	1APL79
2	2	"Climb Every Mountain Biker"	Adam Davidson	Elizabeth Ann Phang & Diane Ruggiero-Wright	October 10, 2008	1APL01
3	3	"Protect and Serve"	Lev L. Spiro	Rick Eid & Matt McGuinness	October 17, 2008	1APL02
4	4	"Do You Love Me, Do You Surfer...Boy"	Tamra Davis	Matt McGuinness & Elizabeth Ann Phang	October 24, 2008	1APL05
5	5	"Momma's Boy"	N/A	Elizabeth Ann Phang	Unaired	1APL03
6	6	"Daphne's Idealized Wedding"	Dennie Gordon	Patricia Carr & Lara Olsen & Elizabeth Ann Phang	Unaired	1APL04
7	7	"Trustafarian"	Paul Holahan	Elizabeth Ann Phang & Amy Turner	Unaired	1APL06
8	8	"Art Professor"	Steve Miner	Elizabeth Ann Phang & Diane Ruggiero-Wright	Unaired	1APL07
9	9	"Flower King"	John Peters	Rick Eid & Elizabeth Ann Phang & Diane Ruggiero-Wright	Unaired	1APL08
10	10	"The Spark"	John T. Kretchmer	Patricia Carr & Lara Olsen & Elizabeth Ann Phang & Diane Ruggiero-Wright	Unaired	1APL09
11	11	"The Babysitter"	Janice Cooke	Elizabeth Ann Phang & Michael Platt & Barry Safchik	Unaired	1APL10
12	12	"Metro Guy and the Non Ex"	Paul Holahan	Patricia Carr & Lara Olse & Elizabeth Ann Phang & Diane Ruggiero-Wright	Unaired	1APL11
13	13	"The Other Foot"	Dennie Gordon	Sigal Avin & Matt McGuinness & Elizabeth Ann Phang & Diane Ruggiero-Wright	Unaired	1APL12

== Critical reception ==
South Coast Today called the series "My Name Is Earl with a whole lot more sex, better-looking people and an emphasis on hedonism and narcissism as opposed to karma and redemption." Time Out called the show's premise "dorky." Entertainment Weekly was more positive, giving the show a B+ rating and saying the show "could be one of the more charming new shows of the fall." The Los Angeles Times was also positive about the show, saying "just because something's almost unforgivably cute doesn't mean it can't also be very good and very funny."

CBS squeezed into the worst top 10 with The Ex List. “It had one of the least appealing main characters of any recent network show I can remember,” said John Crook of Tribune Media Services.

== Ratings ==
The series premiere attracted 6.85 million viewers and posted a 2.0 in the 18–49 demographic, ranking first in both viewers and the demo for its time slot. Ratings steadily declined, and on October 31, CBS replaced the series with a rerun of NCIS, which topped the highest-rated episode of The Ex List by 65%. The network subsequently canceled the series.

== Home media ==
At the Twilight premiere, Elizabeth Reaser announced an international DVD release of the series will include 13 episodes. "I'm still shooting the show, which is odd. The scripts have been rewritten to give [fans] some closure. [Bella] will figure out which ex is the one. I do find the guy, and it's someone we met in an earlier episode."
