= Kambek =

- Genre: drama thriller
- Written by: Ilya Kulikov; Aleksei Ivanov; Vasily Vnukov
- Directed by: Dinar Garipov
- Starring: Alexander Petrov; Aleksey Chadov; Grigory Stolbov; Illarion Marov; Khetag Khinchagov; Vasilisa Korostyshevskaya; Konstantin Gatsalov
- Composers: Anton Sevidov; Andrei Timonin
- No. of seasons: 1
- No. of episodes: 8

Original release
- Network: Kinopoisk
- Release: 4 October – 15 November 2025

Kambek (Russian: Камбэк) is a 2025 Russian television series directed by Dinar Garipov. It stars Alexander Petrov.

== Plot ==
The film takes place in 2004. A man, suffering from amnesia, regains consciousness and becomes homeless. He saves a group of children, who in turn do everything they can to restore his memory and life.

== Cast ==
- Alexander Petrov as Kompot
- Aleksey Chadov as Dron
- Grigory Stolbov as Oleg
- Illarion Marov as Yura
- Khetag Khinchagov as Ptakha
- Vasilisa Korostyshevskaya as Dasha
- Konstantin Gatsalov

== Production ==
Filming took place in Nizhny Novgorod.
