= Irina Sosnovaya =

Russian film producer

- Born: Almaty
- Occupation: Film producer

Irina Sosnovaya (Russian: Ирина Сосновая; is an international film producer.

== Biography ==
=== Early life ===
Sosnovaya was born in Almaty. She graduated from the Faculty of Applied Political Science at the Higher School of Economics in 2008. During her first year, she began interning at the NTV network with the program “The Country and the World” and then accepted a position as producer and editor-in-chief of the show “Today” with Alexey Pivovarov at NTV, where she worked until 2011.

== Career ==
In 2013 she joined CTC Media to serve as head of the department of transmedia projects From December 2015 to 2017, she worked as creative director of marketing at CTC.

She worked as a producer of Alexey Pivovarov's documentary Rzhev. The Unknown Battle of Georgii Zhukov, which aired on NTV in 2009. This documentary was awarded a special prize for creative achievement at the Nika Awards.

She founded a documentary film production company with Vadim Glusker and worked as a writer and producer on more than twenty documentary films for various Russian television channels. These include Vadim Glusker's documentary series In Search of France. In 2017, she began working at the Yellow, Black and White studio as executive producer and showrunner for the streaming service Start.

Sosnovaya's first Russian series as producer and showrunner was Gold Diggers. This was the first Russian series acquired by Amazon for their line of “Exclusives and Originals”. It was also acquired by Channel 4 and purchased by streaming services in thirteen countries.

She then produced the series Storm, which received more than ten awards in Russia and was a prize-winning entry at the New York Film Awards in 2020.

While working on A Good Man, a series about the most notorious maniac in Russia who murdered 84 women, Sosnovaya conducted an hours-long interview with serial killer Mikhail Popkov. The material from that interview served as the basis for the screenplay. The series was launched on Start in August 2020 and was selected to participate in Serial Killer, the international film and TV festival held in Brno, Czech Republic, where it was awarded Best Central and Eastern European Series.

Sosnovaya also took part as a speaker at the February 2021 TEDx conference.

In April 2021, Esquire magazine named Sosnovaya one of the ten most promising young Russian filmmakers.

In 2021, she produced Nataliya Meshchaninova’s series Alyssa, which received awards at the New Season festival and the award for “creative expression” at the Pilot television festival.

That same year she produced the short film “Get Ready. Off to the Feast”, which shed light on the problem of female genital mutilation in Russia. The film received awards at international film festivals and was also selected to compete at the Clermont-Ferrand International Short Film Festival.

She took part in producing the TV series Container.

In 2020 she served as a jury member for the International Emmy Awards as well as a jury member for series pitches at the Sochi Open Russian Film Festival and the Moscow International Film Festival.

In 2023, Sosnovaya was awarded a special prize for Best Showrunner (for the series Gold Diggers, Mediator and Storm, Alyssa, The Duel Club, and Living Life) at the Fifth Annual Pilot television festival.

In 2024 Sosnovaya became the general producer of UNICO STUDIO (Kazakhstan).

== Awards and nominations ==
Year	Award	Nomination	Result	Source
2020	Serial Killer (festival)	Winners of The Best CEE Series	Nominated	
2020	APKIT Award	«Best TV series (5 — 24 episodes)» for the series «STORM»	Won	
2023	Festival Pilot	Best Showrunner	Won	
