= Moths Games =

- Russian: Игры мотыльков
- Directed by: Andrey Proshkin
- Written by: Galina Arbuzova; Vladimir Kozlov; Andrey Proshkin; Vladimir Zheleznikov
- Produced by: Mikhail Litvak; Vladimir Zheleznikov; Aleksandr Zosimenko
- Starring: Aleksey Chadov; Mariya Zvonaryova; Oksana Akinshina; Yuriy Kuznetsov; Andrey Smolyakov
- Cinematography: Yury Rayskiy
- Edited by: Natalya Kucherenko
- Music by: Vladimir Chekasin
- Production company: Globus Studio
- Release date: 2004
- Running time: 105 min.
- Country: Russia
- Language: Russian

Moths Games (Russian: Игры мотыльков, romanized: Igry motylkov) is a 2004 Russian drama film directed by Andrey Proshkin.

== Plot ==
The film tells about a young rock musician who is invited to the capital to take part in the final of a television music competition. In the wake of euphoria on the eve of departure, he, along with friends, steals someone else's car. Suddenly a tragedy happened: they shot down a man.

== Cast ==
- Aleksey Chadov as Kostya
- Mariya Zvonaryova as Liza
- Oksana Akinshina as Zoyka
- Yuriy Kuznetsov as Stepanych
- Andrey Smolyakov as Glebov
- Aleksey Shevchenkov as Kupriyanov
- Darya Ekamasova as Chicha
- Polina Golovina as Alka
- Yuliya Lomakina as Mashka
- Sergey Shnurov as John
- Sergei Frolov as Kaban
- Arkady Ukupnik as cameo
