= The Lesson (Israeli TV series) =

- שעת אפס
- Genre: Drama
- Created by: Deakla Keydar
- Written by: Deakla Keydar
- Directed by: Eitan Zur
- Starring: Maya Landsmann; Doron Ben-David; Leib Lev Levin; Alma Zak
- Music by: Ran Bagno
- Country of origin: Israel
- Original language: Hebrew
- No. of seasons: 1
- No. of episodes: 6

Production
- Producers: Yochanan Kredo; Eze Sakson; Guy Jacoel; Yossi Uzrad
- Cinematography: Boaz Yehonatan Yaacov
- Running time: 35 minutes
- Production company: Jasmine TV

Original release
- Network: Kan 11
- Release: 10 January – 4 February 2022

The Lesson (Hebrew: שעת אפס, romanized: Sh'at Efes, lit. 'Zero Hour') is an Israeli drama series, directed by Eitan Zur. It premiered on January 10, 2022, on Kan 11.

In April 2022, it won the prize for Best Series at Cannes International Series Festival in 2022. The show was also named Best Drama Series at the Israeli Television Academy Awards in 2023.

== Plot ==
The show follows Amir, a high school civics teacher, and Lian, a 17-year-old student in his class as a debate over harassment at the local swimming pool gets out of control and the consequences spill far beyond the classroom.

The story was inspired by the true story of a teacher in Israel who was fired after a student criticized him on social media for sharing political opinions in the classroom.

== Awards and nominations ==
At the 2022 Canneseries, the show won two prizes: Best Series, and Best Performance (for actress Maya Landsman)

At the Israeli Television Academy Awards in 2023, the show was nominated for 10 awards, winning 3: Best Drama Series, Best Lead Actress in a Drama Series (Maya Landsman), and Best Screenplay.
