= 2022 Canneseries =

2022 television festival

2022 Cannes International Series Festival
- Location: Cannes, France
- Founded: 2018
- Awards: Best Series (The Lesson)
- Festival date: 1–6 April 2022
- Website: canneseries.com/en

Canneseries
- 2023 2021

The 5th Cannes International Series Festival is a television festival that took place from 1 to 6 April 2022 in Cannes, France.

The Best Series award went to the Israeli drama series The Lesson.

== Juries ==
The following juries were named for the festival.

=== Competition ===
- Fanny Herrero, French showrunner, Jury President
- Anne Marivin, French actress
- Denis O'Hare, American actor
- Ólafur Darri Ólafsson, Icelandic actor
- Sami Outalbali, French actor
- Daniel Pemberton, British composer

=== Short Form Competition ===
- Anthony Horowitz, English novelist and screenwriter, Jury President
- Chinenye Ezeudu, British actress
- Marc Ruchmann, French actor

== Official selection ==
=== In competition ===
The following series were selected to compete:

Title	Original title	Creator(s)	Production countrie(s)	Network
1985		Willem Wallyn	Belgium	VRT, RTBF, Canal+
Afterglow	Etterglød	Atle Knudsen & Kjetil Indregard	Norway	NRK
Audrey's Back	Audrey est revenue	Guillaume Lambert & Florence Longpré	Canada	Club Illico, Quebecor Media
Bang Bang Baby		Andrea Di Stefano	Italy	Prime Video
The Dreamer – Becoming Karen Blixen	Drømmeren – Karen Blixen bliver til	Dunja Gry Jensen	Denmark	Viaplay
El Inmortal. Gangs of Madrid		José Manuel Lorenzo	Spain	Movistar Plus+
The Inside Game, Seeds of Wrath	Jeux d'influence, les combattantes	Antoine Lacomblez & Jean-Xavier de Lestrade	France	Arte
The Lesson	Sh׳at Efes	Deakla Keydar	Israel	Kan 11
Punishment	Strafe	—	Germany	RTL+, VOX
Souls		Alex Eslam	Germany	Sky Atlantic

=== Short Form Competition ===
The following series were selected to compete:

Title	Original title	Creator(s)	Production countrie(s)	Network
Complètement Lycée		Rosalie Vaillancourt & Alec Pronovost & Charles-Alex Duran & Pierre-Yves Roy-Desmarais	Canada	Noovo
Educational TV	TV Educativa	Marco Caltieri & Pablo Marcovecchio	Uruguay	—
Everything You Love	Alt du elsker	Marie Hafting	Norway	Discovery
Hacked		Anthony Van Biervliet & Ruben Vandenborre	Belgium	Streamz, GoPlay
Hell	El Infierno	Santiago Mouriño & Pablo Balmaceda	Argentina	—
It's Fine, I'm Fine		Stef Smith	Australia	—
Night Cat Express: Night Dream	Ye Mao Kuai Di Zhi Hei Ri Meng	Wei Huang & Yirui Wang & Chuan Wang & Ye Shu	China	Bilibili
Normaloland		Matthias Thönnissen	Germany	ZDF
Platonique		Camille Rosset & Elie Girard	France	OCS
Revenge of the Black Best Friend		Amanda Parris	Canada	CBC Gem

=== Out of competition ===
The following series were screened out of competition:

Title	Original title	Creator(s)	Production countrie(s)	Network
Halo		Kyle Killen & Steven Kane	United States	Paramount+
Infiniti		Stéphane Pannetier & Julien Vanlerenberghe	France, Belgium	Canal+
Le Flambeau, les aventuriers de Chupacabra		—	France	Canal+
Visions		Jeanne Le Guillou & Bruno Dega	France	TF1

== Awards ==
The following awards were presented at the festival:

- Best Series: The Lesson by Deakla Keydar
- Dior Grand Award: Audrey's Back by Guillaume Lambert and Florence Longpré
- Best Screenplay: Alex Eslam, Lisa Van Brakel, Senad Halilbašić and Erol Yesilkaya for Souls
- Best Music: Dascha Dauenhauer for Souls
- Special Interpretation Award: Denis Bouchard, Martin-David Peters, Zeneb Blanchet, Joanie Guérin, Ellicyane Paradis, Charlie Lemay-Thivierge and Dominic St. Laurent for Audrey's Back
- Best Performance: Maya Landsmann for The Lesson
- High School Award for Best Series: Afterglow by Atle Knudsen and Kjetil Indregard
- Best Short Form Series: Hacked by Anthony Van Biervliet and Ruben Vandenborre
- Dior Revelation Award: Complètement Lycée by Rosalie Vaillancourt, Alec Pronovost, Charles-Alex Duran and Pierre-Yves Roy-Desmarais
- Student Award for Best Short Form Series: Everything You Love by Marie Hafting

=== Special awards ===
The following honorary awards were presented at the festival:

- Variety Icon Award: Gillian Anderson
- Madame Figaro Rising Star Award: Sydney Sweeney
- Konbini Commitment Award: Skam France
