= Nehama =

- נחמה
- Genre: Comedy drama
- Created by: Reshef Levi; Tomer Shani
- Directed by: Tomer Shani
- Starring: Reshef Levi; Shalom Michaelshvili; Liron Weissman; Yuval Segal
- Music by: Haim Frank Ilfman
- Country of origin: Israel
- Original language: Hebrew
- No. of seasons: 1
- No. of episodes: 10

Production
- Cinematography: Giora Bejach
- Running time: 52 minutes
- Production companies: Yoav Gross Productions; 24 Drafts Studio

Original release
- Network: Hot
- Release: 27 June – 29 August 2019

Nehama (Hebrew: נחמה) is an Israeli comedy drama series created by Tomer Shani and Reshef Levi that aired on Hot. The show premiered on 27 June 2019 and concluded on 29 August 2019.

In October 2020, First Look Media acquired the show's U.S. rights, with plans to develop an English-language adaptation. On 28 October 2021 it was announced that Martin Lawrence would lead the adaption, which would be produced by Topic Studios.

== Plot ==
The series follows the story of Guy Nehama, a father of five who loses his wife in a car accident. In addition to managing his grief and his responsibilities toward his children, Nehama begins to chase an old dream — stand-up comedy.

== Awards ==
Nehama was selected to compete in the 2019 Cannes International Series Festival, winning the prize for Best Performance (for Reshef Levi).

The show was nominated for 10 awards at the Israeli Television Academy Awards in 2019, of which it won two: Best Comedy Series and Best Screenplay for a Comedy Series.
