= Losing Alice =

Israeli psychological thriller television series

- Promotional poster
- Genre: Psychological thriller
- Created by: Sigal Avin
- Screenplay by: Sigal Avin
- Directed by: Sigal Avin
- Starring: Ayelet Zurer; Lihi Kornowski; Gal Toren; Shai Avivi; Chelli Goldenberg; Nova Dovel; Yossi Marshek
- Country of origin: Israel
- Original language: Hebrew
- No. of seasons: 1
- No. of episodes: 8

Production
- Executive producers: Sigal Avin; Guy Levi; Tamar Mozes-Borovitz; Nadiv Palti; Jonathan Paran
- Producers: Keren Noyman; Idit Paran; Rachel Paran
- Cinematography: Rotem Yaron
- Editor: Yael Hersonski
- Production company: Dori Media Group

Original release
- Network: Hot 3
- Release: June 18 – August 6, 2020

Losing Alice is an Israeli psychological thriller television series created, written, and directed by Sigal Avin for the Israeli channel Hot 3. The series follows a 48-year-old film director, Alice, whose career has slowed down while raising her three daughters, until she meets a young screenwriter, Sophie, with whom she quickly becomes obsessed. The series premiered in Israel on June 18, 2020 on Hot 3. It premiered internationally on January 22, 2021 on Apple TV+.

== Plot ==
The series follows Alice Ginor (Ayelet Zurer), a 48-year-old esteemed filmmaker who feels stuck professionally, old externally, no longer relevant and tired in the face of the endless energy of her three daughters, whom she raises together with David (Gal Toren), a successful and coveted actor. One day, in a chance meeting on the train, Alice meets Sophie (Lihi Kornowski), a promising young femme fatale screenwriter in her 20s, who introduces herself as a fan of Alice and dreams that Alice will direct the script she wrote. Sophie's talent, youth and erupting sexuality arouse Alice, who develops an obsession with her and puts her into her professional, family and sexual life. In what appears to be a conscious choice, Alice is drawn into Sophie's dark and destructive world, and as the plot progresses and twists it is no longer clear who has penetrated whose life, who takes and who gives, and who will lead whom to the fatal end.

== Cast ==
- Ayelet Zurer as Alice
- Lihi Kornowski as Sophie
- Gal Toren as David
- Shai Avivi as Ami
- Chelli Goldenberg as Tami
- Nova Doval as Keren
- Yossi Marshek as Tamir

== Episodes ==
No.	Title	Directed by	Written by	Original release date
1	"The Encounter"	Sigal Avin	Sigal Avin	June 18, 2020
2	"The Visit"	Sigal Avin	Sigal Avin	June 25, 2020
3	"The Bond"	Sigal Avin	Sigal Avin	July 2, 2020
4	"The Obsession"	Sigal Avin	Sigal Avin	July 9, 2020
5	"The Paranoia"	Sigal Avin	Sigal Avin	July 16, 2020
6	"The Bad Reader"	Sigal Avin	Sigal Avin	July 23, 2020
7	"The Scene"	Sigal Avin	Sigal Avin	July 30, 2020
8	"The End"	Sigal Avin	Sigal Avin	August 6, 2020

== Production ==
Originally airing on Hot 3 in Israel, Apple announced in June 2020, that it had partnered with Dori Media productions and Hot to co-produce and exclusively stream Losing Alice internationally on Apple TV+.

== Reception ==
On review aggregator Rotten Tomatoes, Losing Alice holds an approval rating of 78% based on 23 reviews, with an average rating of 7.5/10. The website's critical consensus reads, "Twisty and thrilling, if a tad long, Losing Alice is an engaging psychological drama with style to spare." On Metacritic, which uses a weighted average, it has a score of 75 out of 100 based on 5 reviews, indicating "generally favorable" reviews.
