= War (2002 film) =

War Война
- Film poster
- Directed by: Aleksei Balabanov
- Written by: Aleksei Balabanov
- Produced by: Sergei Selyanov
- Starring: Aleksei Chadov; Ian Kelly; Ingeborga Dapkūnaitė; Sergei Bodrov Jr.
- Cinematography: Sergei Astakhov
- Edited by: Marina Lipartiya
- Music by: Vyacheslav Butusov
- Distributed by: CTB Film Company; Intercinema Art
- Release date: March 14, 2002
- Running time: 120 minutes
- Country: Russia
- Languages: Russian, English, Chechen

War (Russian: Война, translit. Voina) is a 2002 Russian war film by Aleksei Balabanov about the Second Chechen War, starring Aleksei Chadov and Ian Kelly.

== Plot ==
The story is told from the perspective of former conscript Ivan Yermakov (Alexei Chadov), a defendant in a pre-trial detention facility who is giving an interview to a journalist. As he begins recounting his story, the film cuts to Chechnya in the summer of 2001, during the Second Chechen War. Being held captive by Chechen warlord Aslan Gugayev (Georgy Gurguliya), Ivan serves as a domestic slave and Aslan's communications specialist, since Ivan graduated from a computer school and speaks English. One day, Aslan also captures two actors from England: John Boyle (Ian Kelly) and his fiancée Margaret Michaelsen (Ingeborga Dapkūnaitė). After a while, Ivan and the actors are transported to another village and put in a dungeon, where they meet Captain Medvedev (Sergei Bodrov, Jr.), paralyzed as a result of a shrapnel wound to the spine.

Aslan releases John so that he can collect £2 million for Margaret's ransom. He also releases Ivan, as no one is willing to pay the ransom for him. As Ivan leaves, Aslan warns him not to come back.

John's efforts to raise money are unsuccessful, but one of the English television companies provides him with £200,000 in exchange for detailed video footage of the operation. In Moscow, John encounters complete indifference from military officials and decides to ask Ivan to help him free Margaret.

Ivan's life in his native Tobolsk is not working out. He cannot adapt to a peaceful life and he cannot find work. Before that, he came to St. Petersburg to visit the family of Captain Medvedev, whom no one is willing to rescue. Therefore, when John comes to Tobolsk, Ivan agrees to go to Chechnya for a reward.

After passing through Moscow and Vladikavkaz, Ivan and John secretly enter Chechnya, along the way capturing an SUV with a large amount of weapons in the trunk. On their way, they kidnap a local, Ruslan Shamayev (Euclid Kyurdzidis), and Ivan finds his way to Gugayev's village. After waiting for a large group of militants to leave, Ivan, John, and Ruslan attack the village. While Ivan and Ruslan shoot the guards with the weapons they seized earlier on the road, John discovers Margaret in a pit completely naked and assumes that she was raped by the militants. John, in a rage, kills Gugaev, complicating the situation: Ivan needed the Gugaev alive as a hostage.

Gugayev's militants organize a shelling of the village and a pursuit, but the group escapes on a makeshift raft and takes up defensive positions in an old fortress tower. Using a satellite phone taken from Aslan, Medvedev organizes support from the Air Force. Russian helicopters arrive, routing the militants, and deliver the group to a military base.

John gives Ivan the money he earned, of which Ivan gives Ruslan a thousand pounds. Ivan later gives the remaining money to Captain Medvedev for treatment.

The film ends with a brief commentary from Ivan. Margaret did not marry John. John, having constantly filmed his journey, released a film and a book titled My Life in Russia. After the release of the film, Ivan was brought to trial for the murder of "peaceful citizens of the Russian Federation." Ruslan, who moved to Moscow, testified against Ivan. The only one who stood up for Ivan was Captain Medvedev.

== Cast ==
Actor	Role
Aleksei Chadov	Sergeant Ivan Yermakov
Ian Kelly	John Boyle
Ingeborga Dapkūnaitė	Margaret (John's fiancée)
Euclid Kyurdzidis	Ruslan Shamayev
Sergei Bodrov Jr.	Captain Medvedev
Georgy Gurguliya	Aslan Gugayev
Vladimir Gostyukhin	Ivan's father
Irina Sokolova	Captain Medvedev's mother
Stas Stotsky	Fedya Kulik
Yuri Stepanov	Alexander Matrosov

== Film crew ==
Director	Aleksei Balabanov
Screenwriter	Aleksei Balabanov
Camera Operator	Sergei Astakhov
Artist	Pavel Parkhomenko
Producer	Sergei Selyanov

== Production ==
Aleksei Balabanov wrote the scenario for the film in 1998. after he saw on television the severed heads of English specialists who worked in Chechnya.

Balabanov tried to make a film that was as realistic as possible, to the point of naturalism. Before filming, he talked to former captives from the First Chechen War, traveled through the villages of Kabardino-Balkaria, met with the commander of the troops in Chechnya, General Viktor Kazantsev, and watched videotapes with chronicles of Chechen atrocities. He showed some of these films to the English actor Ian Kelly. According to Balabanov, Kelly was shaking during the screening.

The work was difficult from a psychological point of view. Before that, we had watched tapes of people being killed for real, recorded by militants. This spectacle made a very strong impression, to an extent that I didn’t even expect. I probably walked around for three days like I’d been hit on the head with a hammer. I liked wearing striped shirts, and they killed one paratrooper in a striped shirt. So, while we were living in the mountains, for some reason I didn’t wear a striped shirt.

— Sergei Astakhov

The film was shot in Kabardino-Balkaria, North Ossetia, Chechnya, Moscow, St. Petersburg, Tobolsk, and London.

This was the first film role of the then twenty-year-old aspiring actor Alexei Chadov. To film the scenes with the captives lying in the pit, the crew dug out a real pit. The actors laid there filthy for several hours, as Balabanov wanted everything to be as realistic as possible. The scene with actress Ingeborga Dapkūnaitė floating naked in a cold rapid was filmed without using a stunt double.

The filming scared the English actor Ian Kelly the most, as he barely understood Russian. He spent the entire time reading War and Peace on the set.

Poor Ian didn't speak a word of Russian, and Dapkunaite lives in England. And he kept rushing to her, complaining about how he was forced to sit in a hole, how he was forced to climb into a river, how he almost drowned there, how Balabanov told someone right in front of Ian that he was a bad actor. And for Westerners, this is a completely unacceptable form of communication. And Inga patiently explained that Russians always work like this, that Russians have this practice, that Russians always yell, and if they start shooting, then only with real bullets. That's why Russians are used to really drowning and really saving themselves.

— Sergei Bodrov Jr.

To make the film more realistic, many of the Chechens are played by real Chechens, and the Russian soldiers are played by real soldiers, helicopter pilots, and contract intelligence officers. In addition, this is the first film about Chechnya that was, although partially, filmed on Chechen lands, in particular at a checkpoint at the entrance to Grozny. The film was made close to live combat, because during the filming, the Second Chechen War was unfolding in those parts. The shooting took place in calm areas, and the crew was guarded by SOBR officers. In order not to endanger the film's equipment, the CTB company insured it for $500,000.

During the filming in Kabardino-Balkaria, a helicopter used for the film fired thermal missiles and accidentally hit an ancient Balkar cemetery, setting it on fire and destroying many graves. After that, an ethnic conflict almost broke out between the film crew and local residents, but among the SOBR officers guarding the group was a former Chechen captain, Kyuri, who was able to stop the angry crowd. During filming, everyone except Bodrov and Dapkunaite lived in the houses of local residents. Balabanov lived in the house of a woman whose graves of all her relatives were destroyed in the cemetery.

The episode where the main characters of the film were shooting was filmed in the Abaev Tower in the Chereksky District of the Kabardino-Balkarian Republic.

== Music ==
War - Official Soundtrack

Soundtrack album
- Released: 2002
- Genre: Russian rock
- Length: 120 minutes
- Label: Sony Music

Tracklist :
No.	Title	Performer	Length
1.	"Voina (Война, War)"	Timur Mutsurayev	0:52
2.	"Komandor (Командор, Commander)"	Tomas	5:14
3.	"Volki (Волки, Wolves)"	Bi-2	5:37
4.	"SOS"	Splean	4:30
5.	"Bereg (Берег, Coast)"	Vyacheslav Butusov	4:43
6.	"Lyutaya(Лютая, Fierce)"	Volga-Volga	1:36
7.	"Chyorny voron (Чёрный ворон, Black Raven)"	Livan and PEKh	5:53
8.	"Fellini (Феллини)"	Splean/Bi-2	5:05
9.	"Yeshyo ne vecher (Ещё не вечер, Not yet evening)"	Bi-2	4:55
10.	"Plastmassovaya Zhizn' (Пластмассовая Жизнь, Plastic Life)"	Splean	3:31
11.	"Sokol (Сокол, Falcon)"	Bi-2	7:07
12.	"Kholostye puli (Холостые пули, Blank bullets)"	Partisan radio	4:11
13.	"Moya zvezda (Моя звезда, My star)"	Vyacheslav Butusov and Deadushki	5:14
14.	"Vulitsa (Вулиця, Street)"	Okean Elzy	5:28
15.	"Voina (Volki-2) (Война (Волки-2), War (Wolves-2))"	Bi-2	4:33

Music that was featured in the film, but not included in the soundtrack:

Song	Performer
Iyerusalim, Shamil' vedyot otryad	Timur Mutsuraev
Gde zh moya lyubimaya	Arangulov brothers

== Awards and nominations ==
- 2002 - According to leading wholesale companies, the film took fourth place among the 50 best-selling video films in 2002, ahead of a large number of high-budget blockbusters.
- 2002, June - XIII Open Russian Film Festival "Kinotavr" in Sochi, the film participated in the contest, winning the Grand Prize.
- 2002, August - Yalta Film Festival, Grand Prize.
- 2002, August - X "Window to Europe" Film Festival in Vyborg, 3rd place in the "Vyborg Account" nomination.
- 2002, October - Montreal World Film Festival, Canada, "Best Actor" (Aleksey Chadov).
- 2002, December - Golden Aries Award of the National Guild of Film Critics and Cinematography in the nomination "Best Cinematography" (Sergei Astakhov).
- 2003, February - Golden Eagle Award in the nomination "Best Sound" (Maxim Belovolov).
- 2003, April - Nika Award in the nomination "Best Actor" (Sergei Bodrov Jr., posthumously).

== Similar films ==
- Prisoner of the Mountains
