= RTHK 2020 awards =

Radio Television Hong Kong (RTHK) is a public broadcasting service in Hong Kong. The station produced and won many internationally awarded documentaries during the months-long 2019 Hong Kong Anti-Extradition protests.

== 2020 US International Film & Video Festival ==
| Number | Award Type | Video/Program Title | Category |
|---|---|---|---|
| 1 | Gold Camera | This Week - Black Mirror: Social Credit System And Big Data Life In China ("Skyeye", "A Credit Score Is for Life", "The Plight of Dishonest Persons") (Hong Kong) | Best of Festival Nominee - Documentary Documentary: News Specials |
| 2 | Gold Camera | Hong Kong Stories The Quest Of Life - My Plants Journal (Hong Kong) | Documentary: Biography |
| 3 | Gold Camera | Hong Kong Stories #43 My Hometown - Homecoming Pride (Hong Kong) | Documentary: Biography |
| 4 | Gold Camera | "Hong Kong Connection: Minimal Force?" (Hong Kong) | Documentary: News Specials |
| 5 | Silver Screen | Cities In Lockdown (Hong Kong) | Documentary: Public Affairs Programs |
| 6 | Silver Screen | Hong Kong Connection: This Early Summer; Who Stole My Summer Vacation? | Documentary: Continuing News Stories |
| 7 | Silver Screen | Hong Kong Connection: Living in Fear for Disappearing (Hong Kong) | Documentary: Current Affairs |
| 8 | Silver Screen | Hong Kong Connection: Truth Is in the Eyes of The Believer (Hong Kong) | Documentary: News Features/Segments |
| 9 | Certificate | "[Legco Review] A Leaderless Uprising" (Hong Kong) | Documentary: Breaking News Stories |
| 10 | Certificate | [Legco Review] After The Umbrella Movement - The Verdict (Hong Kong) | Documentary: News Features/Segments |
| 11 | Certificate | His And Her Troublesome Family (Hong Kong) | Entertainment: Family |
| 12 | Certificate | Hong Kong Connection - Escape (Hong Kong) | Documentary: Biography |
| 13 | Certificate | Hong Kong Connection : 721 Yuen Long Nightmare (Hong Kong) | Documentary: Investigative/Special Reports |
| 14 | Certificate | Hong Kong Connection: Universities Turned Battlefields (Hong Kong) | Documentary: Public Affairs Programs |
| 15 | Certificate | In the Prisons That Don’t Exist (Hong Kong) "Part 1" "Part 2" "Part 3" | Documentary: Public Affairs Programs |
| 16 | Certificate | My Birthday : Keeping Memories Alive Through Love (Hong Kong) | Documentary: Social Issues |
| 17 | Certificate | My Way II - Music Is My Companion (Hong Kong) | Education: Personal Growth and Development |
| 18 | Certificate | Stories Of Autism (Hong Kong) | Entertainment: Mini-Series |

== 2020 New York Festivals TV & Films Awards ==
| Number | Award Type | Video/Program Title | Category |
|---|---|---|---|
| 1 | Gold | RTHK TV31: Everyday Design - Design Sleeping | Documentary Educational/Instructional |
| 2 | Gold | The Pulse: In the Prisons That Don't Exist – Xinjiang's Re-education Camps "Part 1" "Part 2" "Part 3" | Documentary Educational/Instructional |
| 3 | Silver | Stories of Autism | Entertainment Special: Mini-Series |
| 4 | Silver | Hong Kong Connection - Sagas of '89: June Fourth/Iron Curtain/Searching/Forgetting/Remembering | Series Entry News Program: Best News Documentary/Special |
| 5 | Bronze | This Week: Black Mirror: Social Credit System and Big Data Life in China | News Reports/Features: Special Report |
| 6 | Bronze | The Opening of Sports Unlimited | Promotion/Open and IDs: Sports Program Open and Titles |
| 7 | Bronze | Stories of Autism – Fishball | Craft Program: Best Performance by an Actor |
| 8 | Bronze | RTHK TV31: Everyday Design - Design Adapting | Documentary Magazine Format |
| 9 | Bronze | Legco Review: A Leaderless Uprising | News Program: Best Coverage of Breaking News |
| 10 | Finalist | Taiwan Stories Ii: Tatala of Pongso No Tao | Documentary: Social Issues |
| 11 | Finalist | The Pulse: Freedom From Fear | News Program: Best Coverage of Continuing News Story |
| 12 | Finalist | Hong Kong Connection: 721 Yuen Long Nightmare | News Program: Best Investigative Report |
| 13 | Finalist | Hong Kong Connection: Creativity, Chinese Style | Documentary: Social Issues |
| 14 | Finalist | Hong Kong Connection: This Early Summer, Who Stole... My Summer Vacation? | News Program: Best Coverage of Continuing News Story |
| 15 | Finalist | Hong Kong Connection: Patrick Ho's List | Documentary International Affairs |
| 16 | Finalist | Vaccine Regulations - So Near Yet So Far | News Program: Best News Documentary/Special |

== 2020 The Human Rights Press Awards ==
| number | Award | Title | Category |
|---|---|---|---|
| 1 | Merit | Express Delivery Company Embargoed | Short Video |
| 2 | Winner | Hong Kong Connection: Anti-Extradition Bill Movement Series | Documentary Video |
| 3 | Merit | In the Prisons That Don't Exist "Part 1" "Part 2" "Part 3" | Documentary Video |
| 4 | Merit | This Week - Black Mirror: Social Credit System and Big Data Life in China: "Skyeye"; "A Credit Score Is for Life"; "The Plight of Dishonest Persons" | Documentary Video |
| 5 | Winner | The Exodus from Polytechnic University | Audio |
| 6 | Merit | Testimonies: Abuses in Concentration Camps in Xinjiang | Audio |

== 2020 World Media Festivals ==
| number | Award | Title | Category |
|---|---|---|---|
| 1 | Television and Corporate Media Intermedia-Globe Gold | In the Prisons That Don’t Exist "Part 1" "Part 2" "Part 3" | Documentaries | Human rights |
| 2 | Television and Corporate Media Intermedia-Globe Gold | Frontline Volunteers at the Hong Kong 2019 Movement "Silver Hair" "First Aiders" "Volunteer Lawyers" | News | Feature |

== See also ==
- RTHK
- 2019 Hong Kong Protests
