= When Heroes Fly =

- Genre: Drama; Thriller
- Created by: Omri Givon
- Based on: When Heroes Fly by Amir Gutfreund
- Directed by: Omri Givon
- Starring: Ninet Tayeb; Tomer Kapon; Michael Aloni; Nadav Netz; Moshe Ashkenazi
- Country of origin: Israel
- Original languages: Hebrew; Spanish
- No. of series: 1
- No. of episodes: 9 (Keshet); 10 (Netflix)

Production
- Executive producer: Kfir Weiss
- Producers: Jonathan Doweck; Eitan Mansuri
- Production locations: Israel; Colombia
- Cinematography: Nitai Netzer
- Running time: 45 minutes (Keshet); 50 minutes (Netflix)
- Production company: Spiro Films

Original release
- Network: Keshet 12, Netflix
- Release: 13 May 2018 – present

When Heroes Fly (Hebrew: בשבילה גיבורים עפים, romanized: Bishvila Giborim Afim, lit. 'Heroes fly for her') is an Israeli drama television series that was first broadcast in Israel on Keshet 12 in May 2018. The series was created by Omri Givon and loosely based on the novel of the same name by Amir Gutfreund. It uses flashbacks to account for the differing time periods.

In October 2018, Netflix acquired international broadcasting rights to the series. Keshet has commissioned a second season. The series has also been adapted into an English version for the United States market titled Echo 3 by Apple TV+.

== Synopsis ==
Four former IDF veterans who served together in the 2006 Lebanon War come together to rescue an abducted woman from a drug cartel in Colombia, where one of the veterans lives, to find Yaeli (Ninet Tayeb), a woman once believed to have died in a car accident after the war.

== Cast ==
- Tomer Kapon as Aviv Danino
- Ninet Tayeb as Yael 'Yaeli' Ashkenazi
- Michael Aloni as Dotan 'Himmler' Friedman
- Nadav Netz as Dov 'Dubi' Ashkenazi
- Moshe Ashkenazi as Yakir 'Benda' Ben-David
- Vanessa Chaplot as Maria
- Oded Fehr as Moshiko Boaron
- Dan Mor as Azoulay
- Yael Sharoni as Noga Avrahami
- Rita Shukrun as Aviv's mother
- Gil Franc as Elisha ("Padre Palido")
- Muli Shulman as Ronen Levinger
- Assaf Ben-Shimon as Yaki
- Nili Rogel as Rona Ashkenazi
- Micha Celektar as Avi

== Production ==
Creator Omri Givon had already met Amir Gutfreund, the writer of the original novel, years before Gutfreund's death in 2015. Givon spent eight months writing the final script and decided to concentrate on adapting the final part of the novel that deals with Yaeli's rescue. Givon also decided to replace Chicago with Colombia as the site of the rescue mission so that he could focus on the drug trade industry. Givon decided to film in Colombia due to the budget constraints of filming in his original choice, San Diego. Filming also took place in Tel Aviv.

== English adaptation ==
In July 2020, an English adaptation titled Echo 3 was ordered as a straight-to-series of 10 episodes by Apple TV+., to be produced by Keshet Studios with Mark Boal as showrunner and executive producer. In May 2021, it was announced that Luke Evans was set to star in the series. In June 2021, Elizabeth Anweis and Jessica Ann Collins joined the cast.

== Reception ==
The series won Best Series at the first Canneseries Festival in April 2018.

Adrian Hennigan said in his review of the series for Haaretz:

"What it does best is show how in Israel, mandatory army service is the melting pot that throws diverse groups together – so an Ashkenazi elite or Orthodox Jew can end up taking orders from a scrappy Mizrahi kid in a combat unit – and how these formative experiences bond them like brothers for life." Hennigan also compared the show to the Israeli series Prisoners of War: "...with both shows powerfully depicting the silent horrors of PTSD as ex-soldiers struggle with their wartime experiences." Hennigan praised the performances, noting that "Aloni’s performance is the one that really stays with you."

Decider.com, a pop culture website operated by the New York Post, reviewed the series positively.
