= Canneseries =

Annual television festival held in Cannes, France

- Location: Cannes, France
- Founded: 2018; 8 years ago
- Directors: Fleur Pellerin
- Artistic director: Albin Lewi
- Website: canneseries.com

The Cannes International Series Festival (French: Festival International des Séries de Cannes), usually called the Canneseries, is an international television festival held annually in Cannes, France. The festival aims to showcase and promote television series from around the world. The festival is usually held parallel to MIPTV Media Market.

== History ==
In 2014, the Mayor of Cannes, David Lisnard supported the idea of an international television festival held in the city.

In 2017, former French Minister of Culture Fleur Pellerin was appointed as the festival president and Benoît Louvet as the general manager. In June 2017, the first edition of Canneseries was announced to be held in April 2018.

== Editions ==
No.	Year	Date	Best Series winner	Ref.
1st	2018	4–11 April	When Heroes Fly	
2nd	2019	5–10 April	Perfect Life	
3rd	2020	9–14 October	Partisan	
4th	2021	8–13 October	Mister 8	
5th	2022	1–6 April	The Lesson	
6th	2023	14–19 April	Power Play	
7th	2024	5–10 April	The Zweiflers	
8th	2025	24–29 April	A Better Man	
9th	2026	23–28 April	TBA	

== Festival programme ==
As of 2023, the festival is composed of four different sections:

- Competition
- Short Form Competition
- Documentary Series Competition
- Out of Competition

== Awards ==
As of 2022, the categories presented at the festival were:

- Best Series
- Grand Prize
- Best Screenplay
- Special Award for Best Cast Performance
- Best Performance
- Best Music
- Best Short Form Series
- Revelation Award
- High School Award for Best Series
- Student Award for Best Short Form Series

=== Special awards ===
==== Icon Award ====
The award, presented by American magazine Variety (2018–2022) and French television channel Canal+ (2023–), recognizes outstanding achievement in acting which garners praise from critics and audience.

- 2018: Michelle Dockery
- 2019: Diana Rigg
- 2020: Judith Light
- 2021: Connie Britton
- 2022: Gillian Anderson
- 2023: Sarah Michelle Gellar
- 2024: Kyle MacLachlan
- 2025: Éric Rochant and the cast of The Bureau
- 2026: Adam Scott

==== Madame Figaro Rising Star Award ====
The award, presented by French magazine Madame Figaro, recognizes a young actress for her promising career.

- 2020: Daisy Edgar-Jones
- 2021: Phoebe Dynevor
- 2022: Sydney Sweeney
- 2023: Morfydd Clark
- 2024: Ella Purnell
- 2025: Marie Colomb
- 2026: Jisoo

==== Konbini Prix de l'Engagement ====
The award, presented by French website Konbini, recognizes a talent or a series that has distinguished itself by the artistic quality and the societal, innovative or revolutionary dimension of its work.

- 2021: Laurie Nunn
- 2022: Skam France
- 2023: Joey Soloway
- 2024: Michaela Jaé Rodriguez
- 2025: Nicola Coughlan
- 2026: Richard Gadd

== See also ==
- List of television festivals
