= Naughty (2023 film) =

- Directed by: Dmitry Suvorov
- Written by: Fyodor Derevyansky; Dmitry Suvorov
- Produced by: Dmitry Suvorov; Andrey Lyakhov; Elvira Dmitrievskaya
- Starring: Alexander Petrov; Anastasiya Reznik; Semyon Arzumanov; Yan Tsapnik; Anna Churina; Vladislav Vetrov; Nikita Tarasov
- Cinematography: Pasha Kapinos
- Edited by: Sergey Kucherov; Anna Bespalova
- Production company: SSB Films
- Distributed by: Nashe Kino (English: Our Cinema)
- Release date: February 14, 2023
- Running time: 107 minutes
- Country: Russia
- Language: Russian
- Budget: ₽40 million
- Box office: ₽264 million; $3.5 million

Naughty (Russian: Непослушная, romanized: Neposlushnaya, lit. 'Indocile girl') is a Russian erotic drama film directed by Dmitry Suvorov. It stars Alexander Petrov and Anastasiya Reznik. It was released on February 14, 2023.

== Plot ==
Twenty-year-old Elya Tsvetaeva is a student and a future ecologist. One day, Matvey Rysak, the head of a construction company, comes to her university to talk about a development plan on the site of an old forest park. Elya does not hesitate to smash his project to smithereens. Matvey is intrigued by the girl's self-confidence and uses his usual methods of influence - he simply tries to "buy" her. But Elya doesn't need a sponsor. Then Matvey, surprised by her impregnability, offers Elya a bet: seven romantic days according to his rules. If after that the girl still decides to leave, he will refuse to build a skyscraper in the forest park. She agrees when Matvey really suspends the design work. Elya sees herself as something like the heroine of the film Pretty Woman, but Matvey turns out to be not at all the person she imagined.

== Cast ==
- Alexander Petrov as Matvey Rysak, owner of the Rysak-Development construction company
- Anastasiya "Asya" Reznik as Elvira "Elya" Tsvetaeva, a student of the Faculty of Ecology
- Semyon Arzumanov as Artyom Delovitov, Elya's classmate
- Yan Tsapnik as Vladimir Rysak, Matvey's father, owner of a construction company
- Anna Churina as Victoria Rysak, Matvey's mother
- Vladislav Vetrov as Yuri Tsvetaev, Elya's father, a collector of wooden pallets
- Nikita Tarasov as Trofim, Dean of the Faculty of Ecology
- Nelli Nevedina as Olga, Yuri Tsvetaev's wife, and Elya's stepmother
- Gleb Kulakov as Vanya, a boy, Elya's younger half-brother
- Nikita Pomerantsev as a university teacher at the exam
- Sofia Kovaleva as Nastya, Elya's neighbor

== Production ==
Filming of the project started in early November 2022. This stage of film production was completed a month later, in early December 2022.
