= Sigal Avin =

American-Israeli writer and director

- סיגל אבין
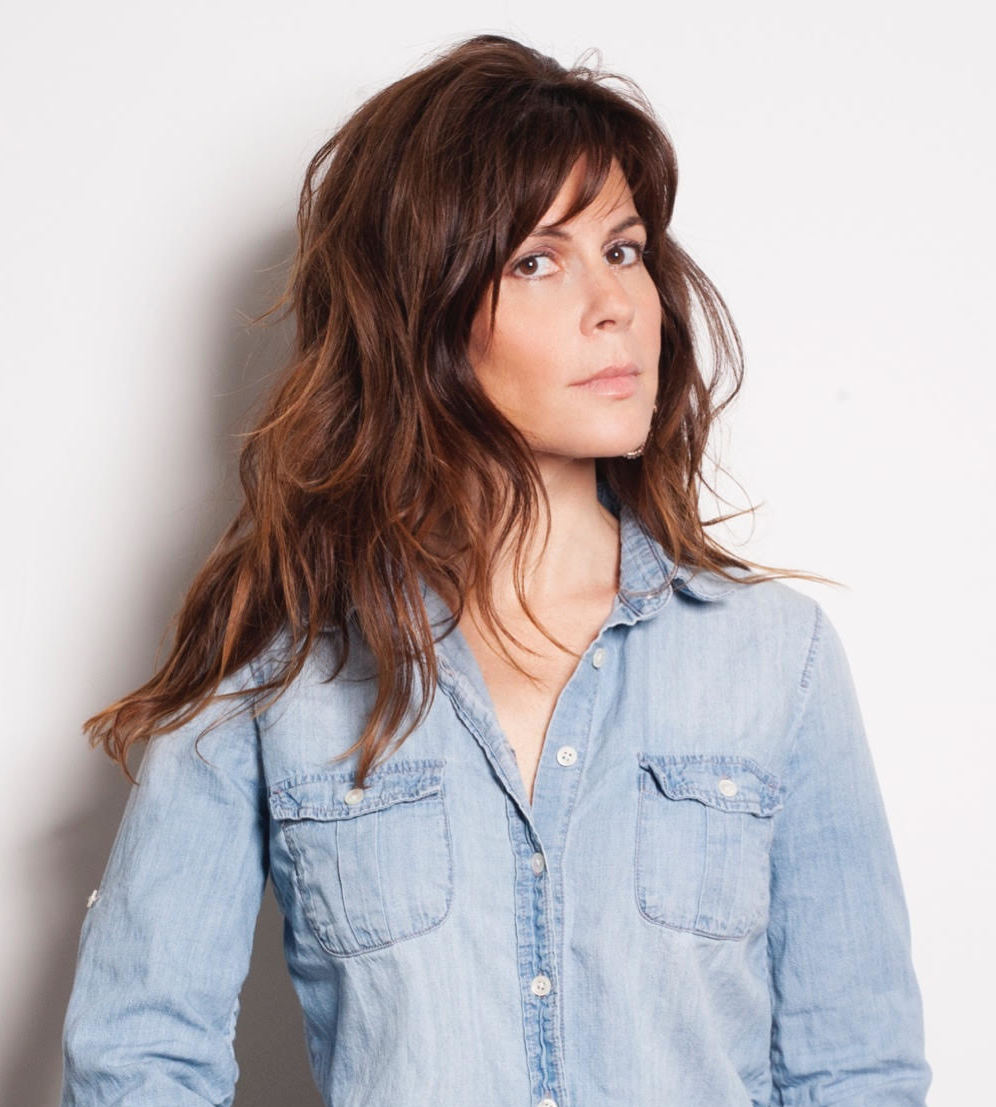
- Avin in 2015
- Citizenship: American-Israeli
- Occupations: Writer, director

Sigal Avin (also spelled: Segahl Avin, Hebrew: סיגל אבין) is an American-Israeli writer and director.

== Early life ==
Sigal Avin was born in Miami, Florida, U.S. and returned to Israel with her Israeli-Jewish parents at the age of ten. When she was sixteen her parents moved back to United States, this time to California. Her father got an offer to manage the Mondrian Hotel in Los Angeles. Avin decided to stay in Israel and finish school.

== Career ==
Avin studied acting at the Yoram Lowenstein acting studio.

She wrote and directed her first play How to make a boy in 1999 for Haifa’s International children’s theatre festival.

In 2000 she wrote and directed Shmulik is a new friend for the same festival and won several prizes, among them, best show and best director. The story was about 3 kids who kidnap a grandmother with a banana because they don’t have one.

Her first play for adults, With a gun and a smile, a sad comedy about small people with small dreams, was chosen by the Israeli culture department to participate in the Australian International Playwrights Festival.

In 2002 Avin created a show called Freaks, inspired by the Todd Brownings film of the same name. The show had no words, was highly praised and was invited to festivals all over the world.

In 2003 Avin created and was show-runner of the acclaimed telenovela Game of life.

In 2004 Avin created and was show-runner of Michaella.

In 2005 Avin created and was show-runner of Telenovela Inc, which told her personal story about the struggle she had trying to write her first telenovela, and the hectic, surreal, life around that industry. The shows still air on Israeli TV in syndication.

Between 2005–2007 Avin was Artistic Manager and director of the young Habima Company (Israel’s national theatre), where she created Taxi, a play about lonely souls and the Israeli decadent night life and directed Marivoux’s The Dispute as a modern reality TV show.

In 2007 Avin created the dramedy Mythological Ex for the Israeli channel 2 Keshet. CBS bought the format and the American version entitled The Ex List premiered in 2008 starring Elizabeth Reaser as the lead.

In 2010 Avin wrote and directed a short film called You shall know no grief, in the 48 hour film project, and won first prize.

In 2013, Avin, inspired by the fact she had become a mother, co-created, wrote and directed the comedy series Bilti Hafich (Irreversible), about what happens to a couple after having their first child. The show starring Adi Ashkenazi and Muli Shulman, premiered on channel 2 Reshet and was the number one comedy in Israel that year.

ABC bought the format. Avin teamed up with Peter Tolan and Sony studios and wrote and directed the American pilot Irreversible Starring David Schwimmer as the lead.

In June 2014 she was featured on Variety’s list of, “10 TV Scribes to Watch.”

In February 2016 the second season of Bilti Hafich, that Avin wrote and directed, aired in Israel.

In December 2016, Avin launched a project she created, wrote and directed called Zematrid on Facebook in Israel. The project includes five short films that show the dynamic behind sexual harassment. The project went viral in a couple of hours. Among the actors in the films are Lior Ashkenazi and Hadas Yaron.

In April 2017 Avin launched the American version of her films depicting sexual harassment called #that's harassment. David Schwimmer and Mazdack Rassi from MILK studios produced. The films star – David Schwimmer, Cynthia Nixon, Emmy Rossum, Bobby Cannavale, Michael Kelly, and more.

In 2020, Avin created, wrote, and directed the psychological neo-noir thriller series Losing Alice. The show follows an aging, ambitious female director who becomes dangerously obsessed with a young, enigmatic screenwriter. The series originally aired in Israel on HOT 3, and was later acquired by Apple TV+ for global distribution.

== Personal life ==
Sigal Avin is married to Amit Mashiah, chief executive officer of Mccann, Tel Aviv. They have two daughters.
