= Yermolova Theatre =

- Московский драматический театр имени М. Н. Ермоловой
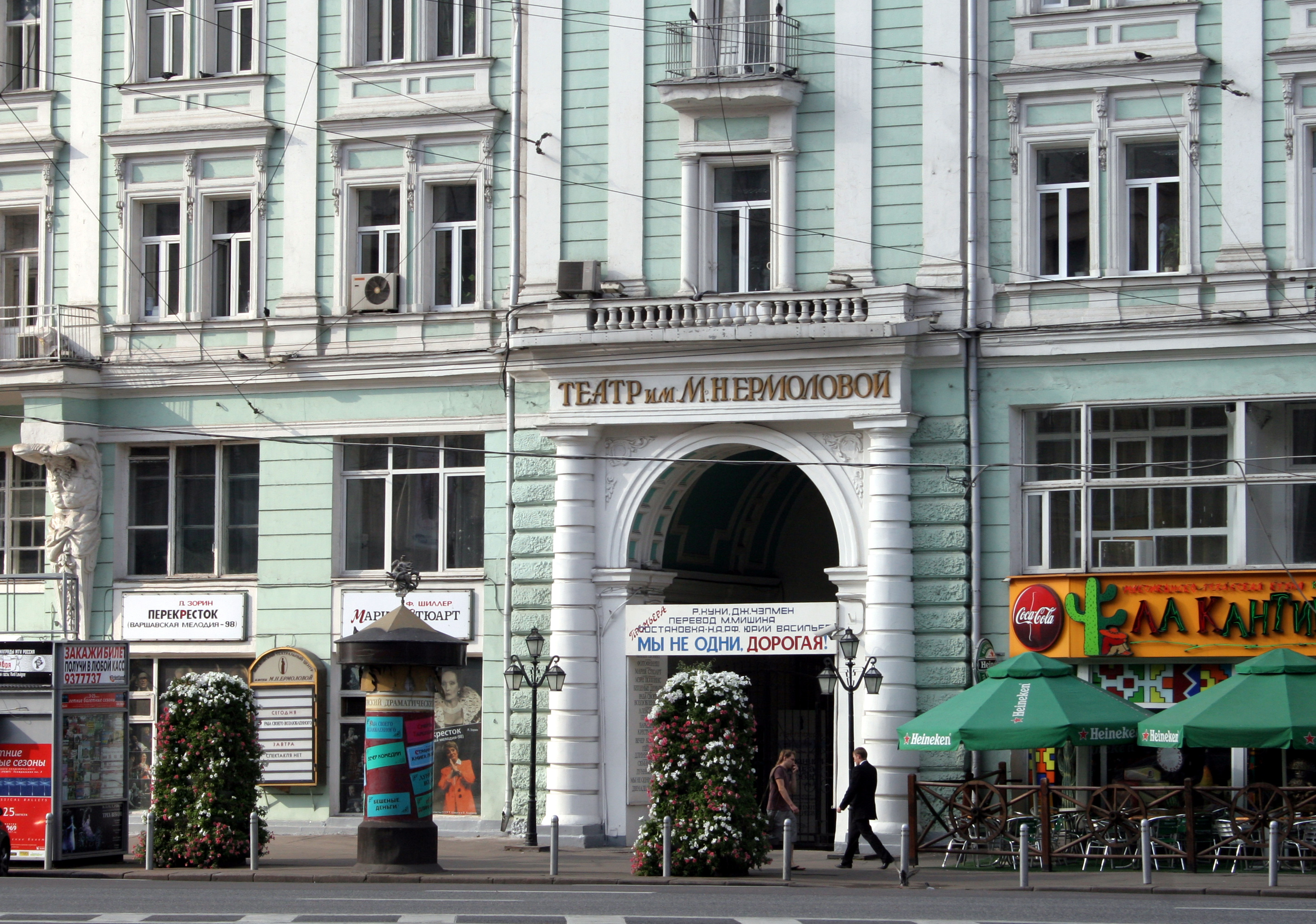
- View of the theatre in 2007
- Interactive map of Yermolova Theatre
- Address: 5/6 Tverskaya Street; Moscow; Russia
- Coordinates: 55°45′28″N 37°36′45″E
- Type: repertory theatre

Construction
- Opened: 1925

Website
- ermolova.theatre.ru

The Yermolova Theatre (Russian: Москóвский теáтр им. М. Н. Ермóловой) is a theatre company in the Tverskoy District of central Moscow. It is under the artistic direction of Vladimir Andreyev (Russian: Владимир Андреев).

The theatre's building was built in the 1830s, and is one of the largest on Tverskaya Street. Tickets for productions cost about 50-300 roubles.

== History ==
The theatre company was founded by graduates of the Maly Theatre studio in 1925, and named after the great Russian actress Maria Yermolova, with her blessing. It started out like most theatres did back then: as a school at first, then a travelling company and eventually became a stationary company. It was one of Moscow's most popular dramatic theatres from 1940 to 1960.
