= Serf 3 =

- Directed by: Klim Shipenko
- Written by: Savva Minaev; Klim Shipenko; Maxim Kudymov
- Produced by: Eduard Iloyan (ru); Denis Zhalinsky (ru); Vitaly Shlyappo (ru); Anton Zlatopolsky (ru); Vadim Vereshchagin; Taimuraz Badziev; David Tsallaev (ru); Mikhail Tkachenko; Sergey Mayevsky; Vazgen Khachatryan; Artur Badziev; Yana Trofimova
- Starring: Miloš Biković; Pavel Priluchny; Kristina Asmus; Ivan Okhlobystin; Aleksandr Samoylenko (ru); Maria Mironova; Vitaliya Korniyenko; Stepan Shevyakov; Oleg Komarov; Olga Dibtseva; Kirill Nagiyev; Sergey Sotserdotsky; Sophia Zayka; Mikhail Babichev; Anna Chipovskaya; Petr Rykov
- Cinematography: Igor Grinyakin
- Production companies: Yellow, Black and White; Mem Media (MEM Cinema Production); Central Partnership Productions; Russia-1; START Studio; Cinema Fund
- Distributed by: Central Partnership
- Release dates: June 9, 2026 (Moscow); June 11, 2026 (Russia)
- Running time: 126 minutes
- Country: Russia
- Language: Russian
- Budget: ₽1.200 billion
- Box office: ₽1.143 billion

Serf 3 (Russian: Холоп 3) is a 2026 Russian comedy film written and directed by Klim Shipenko and produced by Yellow, Black and White. It is a sequel to the 2023 film Serf 2 and stars Miloš Biković, Ivan Okhlobystin, Aleksandr Samoylenko, and Maria Mironova, were joined by Pavel Priluchny, Kristina Asmus, Vitaliya Korniyenko, and Stepan Shevyakov as the four Vyazemsky family. Principal photography began in September 2025 and took place in Moscow, Russia, as well as in Turkey, specifically in the city of Anamur, where the key location was the historic Mamure fortress. The project's production budget was 1.2 billion rubles ($17 million), making it one of the most expensive Russian film productions of modern times.

The film has a secular premiere in Moscow on June 9, 2026, and was theatrically released in Russia on June 11 by the Central Partnership company.

== Plot ==
The film tells the story of the children of spoiled majors who send them back in time, in the time of Peter the Great.

== Cast ==
- Miloš Biković as Gregory 'Grisha', a former major, now a successful leader of large-scale psychological re-education projects. The historical reenactment features an actor playing the Emperor "Peter the Great".
- Pavel Priluchny as Boris 'Borya' Vyazemsky / Serf
- Kristina Asmus as Elena 'Lena' Vyazemskaya / Princess Elena Gagarina, then a slave
- Ivan Okhlobystin as Lev Arnoldovich, an eccentric psychologist, author of a historical rehabilitation method, and the Project's ideological inspirer.
- Aleksandr Samoylenko as Pavel, a prominent entrepreneur, Grisha's father, who continues not only to financially and organizationally support the events organized by his son, but also to participate in them. In the reenactment, he plays an actor as the "Turkish Sultan", who speaks some Russian (he picked it up from his beloved wife).
- Maria Mironova as Anastasia, a television producer, Pavel's second wife, manager and active participant in the Project; in the reenactment, she plays an actress as the "Sultan's Russian wife"
- Vitaliya Korniyenko as Milana, the Vyazemskys' daughter, the effects of divorce
- Stepan Shevyakov as Elisey, the Vyazemskys' son, the effects of divorce on children
- Oleg Komarov as a Project employee, an actor, a.k.a. the commander of the ship heading for the Turks
- Olga Dibtseva as Polina is an actress, a.k.a. "Aglaya" and "Princess Elena Gagarina's governess"
- Kirill Nagiyev as Anton is an actor, a.k.a. the cook on the ship
- Sergey Sotserdotsky as Artyom is an actor, a.k.a. "Proshka", a worker at the shipyard, then a sailor
- Sophia Zayka as Svetlana is an actress, a.k.a. "Lyuba" and "Serf's wife"
- Mikhail Babichev as a Project employee, an actor, a.k.a. "Peter the Great's associate", "Fedor the shipbuilder" and "Serf's distant ancestor"
- Anna Chipovskaya as Vera, a Project scriptwriter, historian, and expert on the era of Peter the Great, consults with Grisha and other Project actors in real time.
- Petr Rykov as Igor, a Project manager who replaces Grisha during his assignment to Turkey to work with Mete, Anastasia's protégé.

Supporting cast

- Sergey Abroskin as the main screenwriter of the Project
- Huseyin Dilber as Said
- Miya Konyakhina as Olya, Vera's daughter
- Osman Aydin as a Turkish actor, a.k.a. "Hakan" and the "Sultan's son"
- Kerem Bürsin as Mete, a Turkish rich kid rehabilitated with Grisha's help (the main character in the Turkish remake of the first film Serf)
- Melisa Döngel as a Turkish actress
- Sofya Kovalyova as Grisha's office secretary
- Natalya Kuznetsova as Margarita
- Andrey Malakhov as himself (cameo appearance)
- Natalya Rogozhkina as Tatyana Novikova, a high-ranking federal official (the main character in the film Serf 2), now Lev Arnoldovich's wife
- Yolka (singer) as himself
- Klim Shipenko as a technician in the control room

== Production ==
Work on the third installment of the franchise was announced in March 2024. In April, the project was presented at a Cinema Fund pitch, where it was confirmed that Klim Shipenko would once again take the director's chair. According to the director, the creators deliberately avoided repeating the trope of a single spoiled hero and decided to tackle the redemption of an entire family, bringing new meaning to the franchise.

The film was produced by Yellow, Black and White with the participation of the Start online cinema, the Russia-1 TV channel, Mem Media (also known as MEM Cinema Production) and Central Partnership Productions, and with the financial support of the Russian Cinema Fund.

Initially, Central Partnership announced filming for September 2024, with a January 23, 2025, release date. However, the Turkish remake of Simarik was later released on that date, and the release of the third installment was delayed by more than a year.

=== Casting ===
Pavel Priluchny called the film the most stunt-heavy movie of his career: many of the action scenes, including falls, fights, and dives from a ship into the sea, were performed by the actors (including Kristina Asmus and Miloš Biković) themselves, without stunt doubles.

=== Filming ===
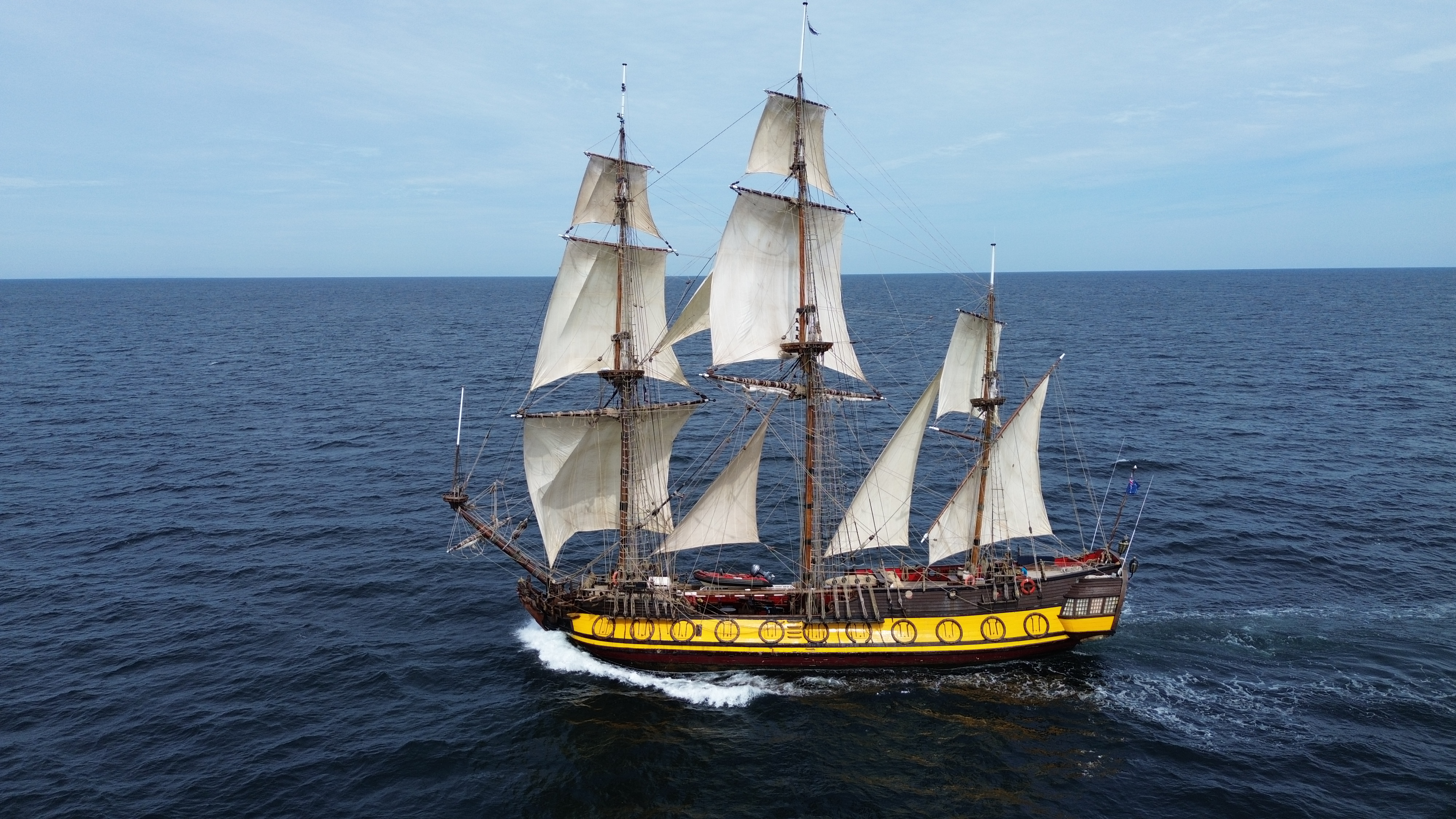
The frigate Shtandart is a working replica of the three-masted sailing ship used for the sea scenes in the film Serf 3.

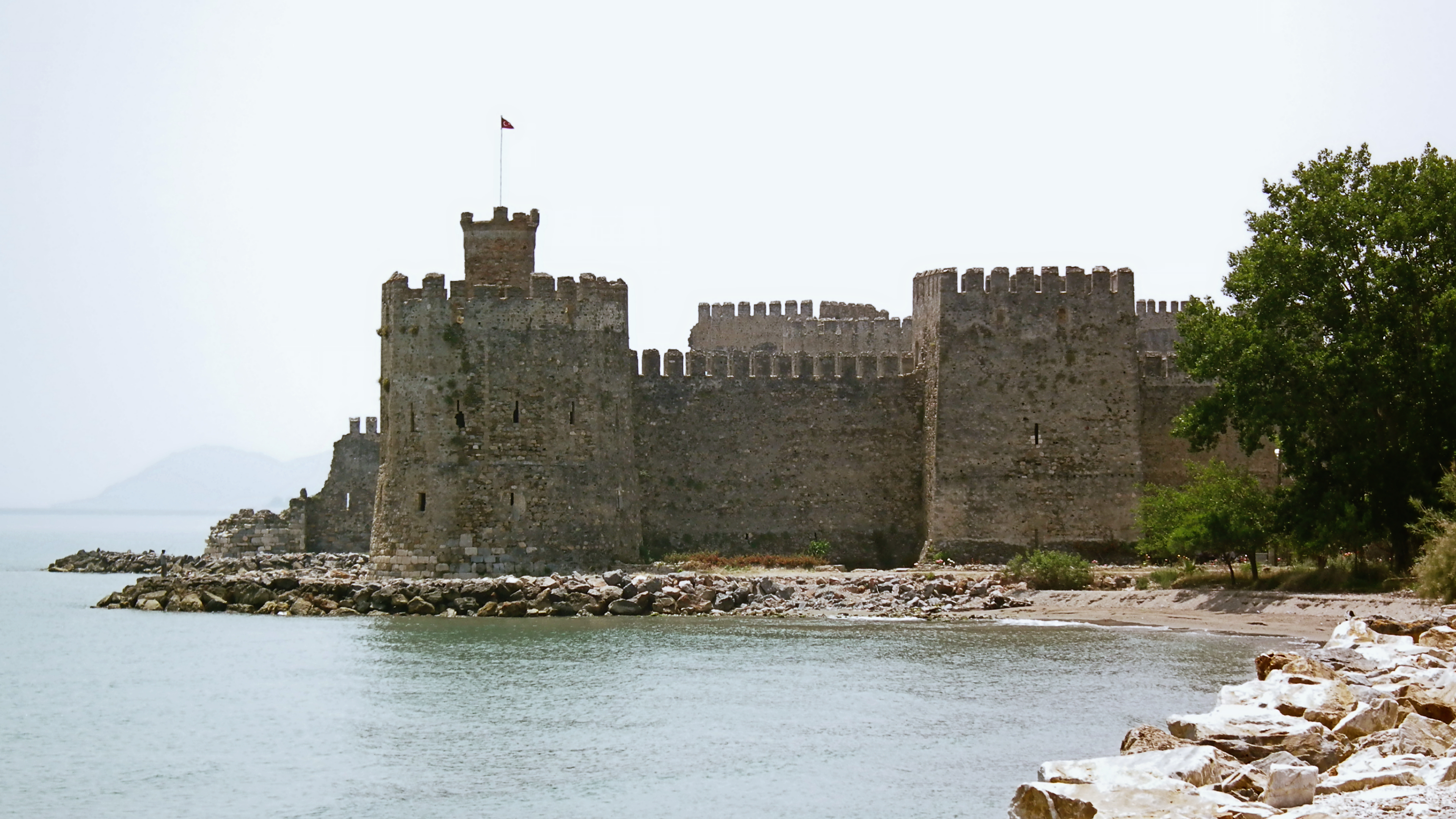
Mamure Castle was a key location in the filming of the comedy Serf 3.

Principal photography began in September 2025. Filming took place in Moscow, Russia and Turkey. The international shoot concluded in February 2026. The primary location in Turkey was the port city of Anamur. The historic Mamure Fortress, a Roman-era monument rarely used by filmmakers, was used as the set for the Sultan's palace. An exception was made, allowing the film crew to work on the site.

The naval scenes were filmed on the high seas on a working replica of the three-masted Russian frigate Shtandart, built using technologies from the Peter the Great era.

For the Turkish block, the designers created costumes inspired by the aesthetics of the 16th and 17th centuries, oriental ornamentation, and the atmosphere of bazaars. Many costume elements required constant hemming and refinishing, so a field sewing workshop was set up right on the set, near the fortress walls.

=== Post-production ===
Klim Shipenko emphasized that he relied on location filming and minimal use of computer graphics to achieve the effect of "live cinema".

== Release ==
Unlike the first two installments in the franchise, which were traditional "New Year's blockbusters," the release of the third installment was postponed to the summer season.

=== Marketing ===
The first teaser trailer for the film was released on February 16, 2026, and the final trailer was released on April 28, revealing plot details and the participation of new actors not previously involved in the franchise.

=== Theatrical ===
The solemn secular premiere of the film with the participation of the cast and star guests took place at the Moscow cinema "KARO 11 October" at the beginning of June 9, 2026, and was theatrically released in the Russian Federation on June 11 by the Central Partnership company.

== Reception ==
=== Box office ===
The opening weekend box office trend is as follows:

- First two days of release (June 11-12): the film earned 111 million rubles, confidently topping the domestic box office and outperforming other major releases of the week (including the biographical drama Michael (2026 film)).
- First weekend (forecast): According to preliminary data from film market analysts, the film's total box office gross over its debut weekend (June 11-14) will be approximately 250 million rubles.

As of June 14, 2026, the Russian box office gross for Serf 3 has exceeded 200 million rubles over its first three days of release.

== Sequel ==
In June 2026, immediately after the premiere of the third part, director Klim Shipenko allowed the creation of the feature film Serf 4. According to the director, the fundamental possibility of producing a sequel directly depends on the final box office receipts of the threequel and long-term audience interest. If the project goes into production, it is expected that Miloš Biković, Aglaya Tarasova and other actors from the main ensemble of the franchise will return to their roles.
