= December (unreleased film) =

- Directed by: Klim Shipenko
- Written by: Klim Shipenko; Aleksey Shipenko
- Produced by: Eduard Eloyan; Denis Zhalinsky; Aleksey Trotsyuk; Vitaly Shlyappo; Vadim Vereshchagin; Georgy Shabanov; Mikhail Tkachenko; Nana Iloyan; Dmitry An
- Starring: Alexander Petrov; Sergey Gilyov; Kristina Asmus; Andrey Merzlikin; Vladimir Vdovichenkov; Aleksandr Samoylenko; Kirill Nagiyev; Mariya Veleshnaya; Sofya Karpunina
- Cinematography: Andrey Ivanov; Boris Litovchenko
- Edited by: Tim Pavelko
- Production companies: Yellow, Black and White; All Media Company; Start; Kinoprime; Cinema Fund
- Distributed by: Central Partnership
- Country: Russia
- Language: Russian

December (Russian: Декабрь, romanized: Dekabr) is an unreleased Russian period detective thriller film written and directed by Klim Shipenko about the last days of the life of the poet Sergei Yesenin, performed by Alexander Petrov, as well as Sergey Gilyov, Kristina Asmus, Andrey Merzlikin, Vladimir Vdovichenkov, Aleksandr Samoylenko, and Kirill Nagiyev in their debut cinematic roles.

It was scheduled to be theatrically released in 2022 by Central Partnership.

== Plot ==
Sergei Yesenin, with the help of Isadora Duncan, plans an escape from the Soviet Union and finds himself on incredible adventures.

== Cast ==
- Alexander Petrov as Sergei Yesenin
- Sergey Gilyov
- Kristina Asmus as Yelizaveta Ustinova
- Andrey Merzlikin
- Vladimir Vdovichenkov
- Aleksandr Samoylenko
- Kirill Nagiyev
- Mariya Veleshnaya as Isadora Duncan
- Sofya Karpunina
- Ronald Pelin

== Production ==
Klim Shipenko wrote the screenplay together with his father, the famous playwright Aleksey Shipenko.

The development of the detective will be done by the Yellow, Black and White studio, which previously collaborated with the cinematographer during the creation of his previous film, Serf (2019).

=== Filming ===
Principal photography began in December 2020 in Moscow and Saint Petersburg. For the film, large-scale scenery of more than 7 thousand square meters has already been built.
