= The Challenge (2023 film) =

2023 motion picture by Klim Shipenko shot on the ISS

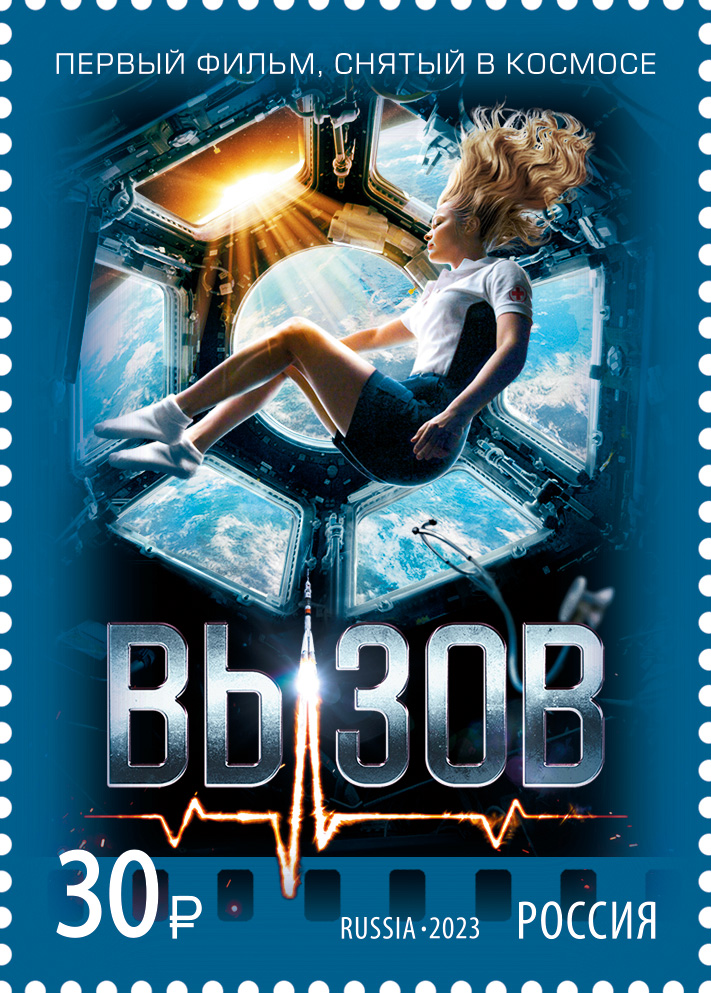
- A Russian stamp printed in 2023 in honor of the film
- Directed by: Klim Shipenko
- Screenplay by: Klim Shipenko; Bakur Bakuradze (ru); Ivan Zamorov; Nailya Malakhova
- Produced by: Konstantin Ernst (Note: He paid for the seats of the film crew); Dmitry Rogozin; Sergey Titinkov (ru); Eduard Iloyan (ru); Denis Zhalinsky (ru); Vitaly Shlyappo (ru); Alexey Trotsyuk (ru); Mikhail Tkachenko; Olga Danova; Natalia Smirnova; Svetlana Izvekova; Nonna Aristarkhova
- Starring: Yulia Peresild; Miloš Biković; Vladimir Mashkov; Alexey Grishin; Andrey Shchepochkin; Aleksandr Baluev; Igor Gordin; Yelena Valyushkina; Aleksandr Samoylenko; Alexey Barabash
- Cinematography: Boris Litovchenko; Klim Shipenko
- Edited by: Tim Pavelko
- Music by: Nikolay Rostov; Sergey Cheremisinov
- Production companies: Glavkosmos; Roscosmos State Corporation; Channel One; Yellow, Black and White; START Studio; Cinema Fund; Algous Studio; Tinkoff Bank; MegaFon
- Distributed by: Central Partnership
- Release dates: April 12, 2023 (State Kremlin Palace); April 20, 2023 (Russia)
- Running time: 165 minutes
- Country: Russia
- Language: Russian
- Budget: ₽905 million (gross)
- Box office: $23.4 million (total amount)

The Challenge
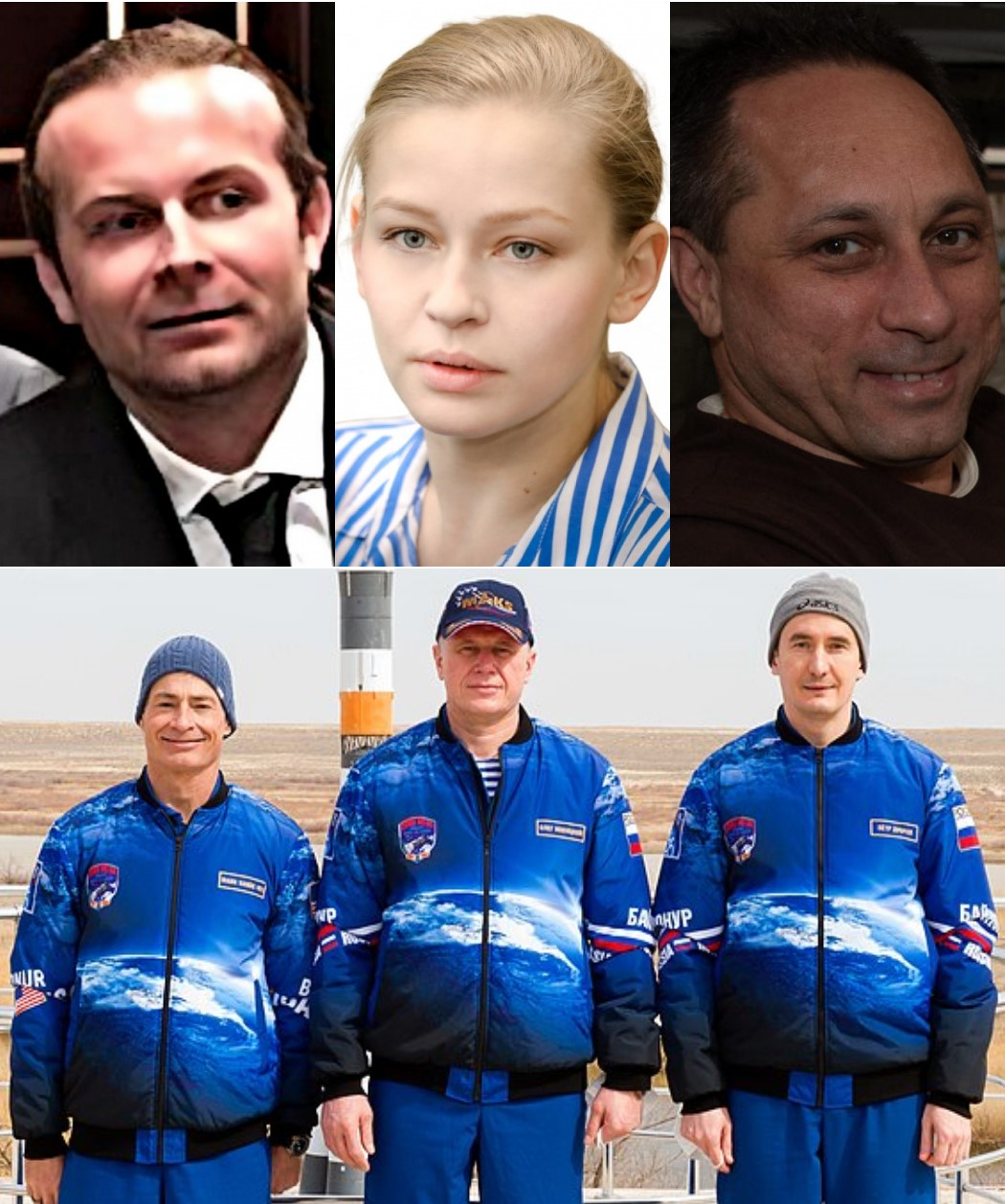
- Cast launched to ISS for the film
- Space career

A film shot on a space station
- Time in space: 11 days, 22 hours and 13 minutes (35–40 minutes of production)
- Missions: Soyuz MS-19/Soyuz MS-18 (Expedition 65) (Equipment launched on Progress MS-17 and returned on Soyuz MS-18)
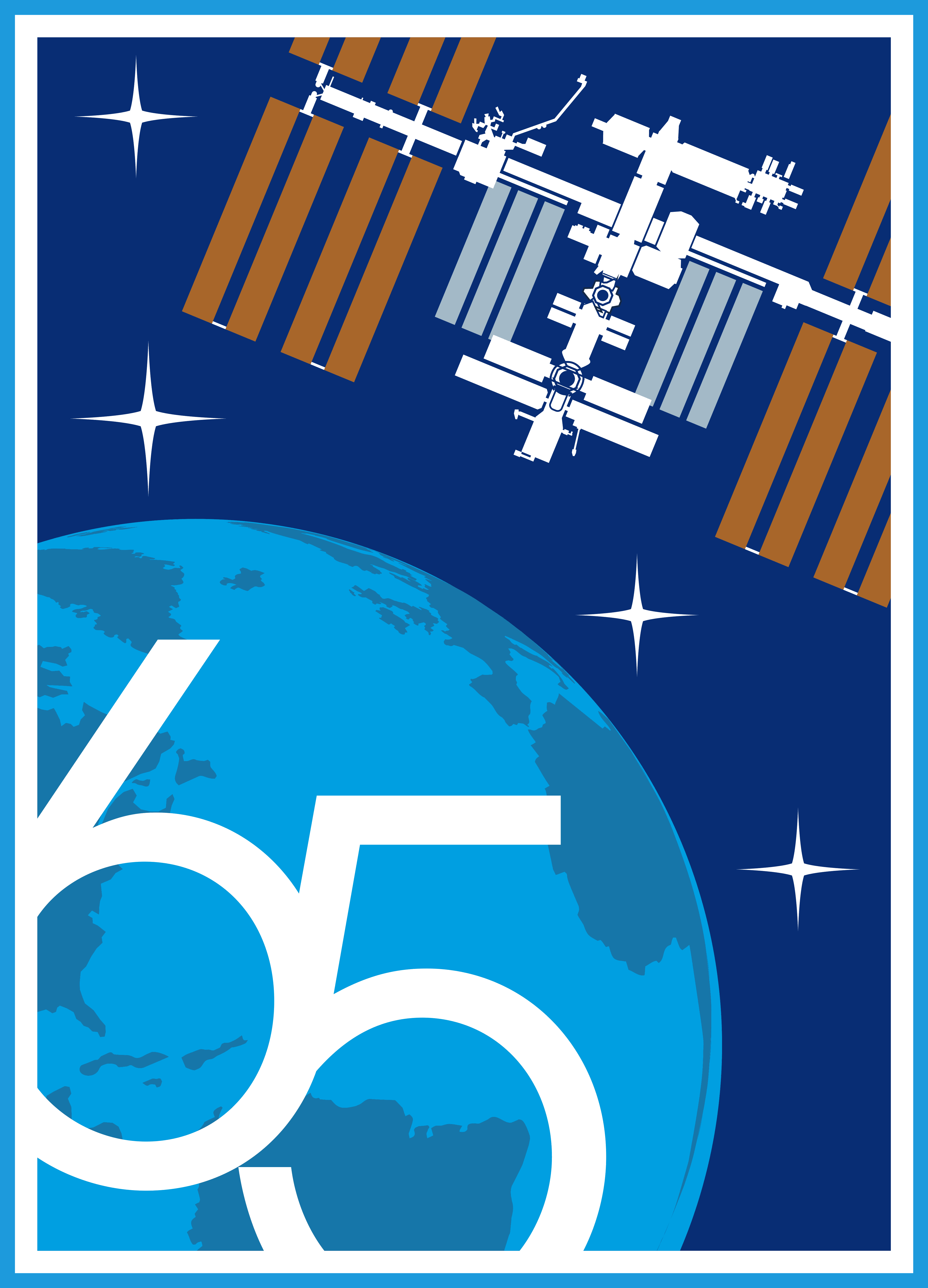
- Mission insignia

The Challenge (Russian: Вызов, romanized: Vyzov) is a 2023 Russian space drama film co-written and directed by Klim Shipenko. Filmed on the International Space Station (ISS), it is the first fictional, feature-length film featuring actors to be shot in space. (Note: The 1984 film Return from Orbit was also a professionally made fictional film in which some scenes were filmed in space (on the Soviet space station Salyut 7 and the spacecraft Soyuz T-9 by cosmonauts Vladimir Lyakhov and Aleksandr Aleksandrov), but in Return from Orbit, the scenes in space did not include professional actors but cosmonauts instead; non-fictional documentary films have also been filmed in space before, like For All Mankind (1989) or A Beautiful Planet (2016).) The film stars Yulia Peresild as a surgeon sent to space to help an injured cosmonaut. The cast also includes Miloš Biković and Vladimir Mashkov. The film crew was accompanied by cosmonauts Anton Shkaplerov, Oleg Novitsky, and Pyotr Dubrov, and NASA astronaut Mark T. Vande Hei.

The Challenge marks the first collaboration between the Russian space corporation Roscosmos and the public broadcaster Channel One, with an approximate budget of around 1.155 billion rubles. Filming on the ISS took place for nearly two weeks.

The Challenge premiered on Cosmonautics Day and was theatrically released in Serbia and Russia on 20 April 2023 by Central Partnership, on CosMAX, an analogue of IMAX.

The film generated more than 1 billion rubles at the box office by the thirteenth day of theatrical showings. It holds the record for the highest-grossing Russian film on its opening day, and it grossed over 2 billion rubles against a production budget of 905 million rubles.

== Plot ==
During a spacewalk, Cosmonaut Oleg Bogdanov falls under a stream of debris and sustains a serious lung injury, requiring urgent medical care. Doctors on Earth conclude that Bogdanov needs surgery as soon as possible. The surgery will have to be completed on the International Space Station; otherwise, Bogdanov will almost certainly die from shock during atmospheric re-entry.

Several young thoracic surgeons volunteer to travel to the ISS to conduct the surgery. The evaluators gradually eliminate candidates during accelerated training. After he is removed from consideration, Vladislav Nikolaev proposes his friend, Evgenia Belyaeva, as a candidate without her knowledge. Belyaeva is admitted to the training program at the Yuri Gagarin Cosmonaut Training Center in Star City.

For about two weeks, Belyaeva prepares for the surgery and trains in a simulator of the ISS. Her training also includes periods of oxygen starvation in a pressure chamber, 6-g exercises in a centrifuge, and 25-second periods of weightlessness in a custom-built Il-76 aircraft. Director Volin selects Belyaeva as the best candidate to perform the surgery on the ISS.

Simultaneously, Belyaeva faces various personal problems. Ten years earlier, her husband was killed in a car accident in which she and her daughter were passengers and the husband was the driver; he had driven through a red light to reach the hospital, where she was urgently needed. Belyaeva has not forgiven herself for her husband's death. Due to her demanding career, Belyaeva also has little time to devote to caring for her aging mother and her teenage daughter, Masha. Masha is facing prosecution for assault after getting into a fight at school.

Two Soyuz crew members will assist Belyaeva on her mission: two Roscosmos cosmonauts Anton Shkaplerov, who will accompany her to orbit, and Pyotr Kudryavtsev, who is already stationed on the ISS. Kudryavtsev has been caring for the injured Bogdanov.

Shkaplerov and Belyaeva launch into orbit in a Soyuz spacecraft, which docks with the ISS. Belyaeva begins operating on Boegdanov. After penetrating Bogdanov's chest cavity, Belyaeva encounters unexpected complications. Blood clots and scar tissue have formed a non-expandable "crust" over one of Bogdanov's lungs. Mission Control decides to give the order for an emergency descent, hoping that Bogdanov will survive the journey, despite the risky odds. However, Belyaeva protests, citing the Hippocratic Oath. At first she is overruled, but after much debate, Director Volin gives her permission to continue.

Belyaeva's attempts to complete the surgery by conventional means initially fail. Nikolaev, who has remained on Earth but is watching the broadcast operation, suggests an unexpected and risky solution based upon a shared experience with Belyaeva during training. Improvising both surgical tools and techniques, Belyaeva completes the operation after seven hours.

Tension mounts as Belyaeva and the crew must wait several days to gauge the success of the operation. Bogdanov eventually revives and heals quickly. Before returning to Earth, the astronauts entertain Belyaeva with some zero-gravity games and a clandestine spacewalk. During the spacewalk, she symbolically releases her guilt over her role in her husband's death.

Upon her and Bogdanov's safe return to Earth, Belyaeva renews her connection to her daughter, Masha. Belyaeva meets Nikolaev at the hospital and learns that he is the one who submitted her name for consideration. After confessing their mutual love, they kiss. In the final scene, Belyaeva's mother stares in disbelief as she watches a news report about her daughter's safe return home.

== Cast ==
- Yulia Peresild as Evgenia Vladimirovna 'Zhenya' Belyaeva, a thoracic surgeon who is launched on an emergency mission to save the life of an ailing cosmonaut
- Miloš Biković as Vladislav Nikolaevich Nikolaev, as Doctor Vlad, one of the surgeons selected to be a candidate for the flight
- Vladimir Mashkov as Constructor Konstantin Volin, a flight director at Mission Control
- Alexey Grishin as Gennady Simonov, a replacement flight director
- Andrey Shchepochkin as Valentin Vershinin, chief surgeon of the Medical Simulation Center at the Botkin Hospital, Belyaeva and Nikolaev's supervisor
- Aleksandr Baluev as a general manager at the Roscosmos Space Center
- Igor Gordin as Dmitry, the crew physician
- Yelena Valyushkina as Galina, Evgenia Belyaeva's mother
- Aleksandr Samoylenko as Prosecutor Semyonov
- Alexey Barabash

Cameos

- Anton Shkaplerov as a Roscosmos cosmonaut
- Oleg Novitsky as Oleg Bogdanov, the injured cosmonaut
- Pyotr Dubrov as Pyotr Kudryavtsev, a test cosmonaut on the ISS
- Anatoly Zabruskov as Anatoly Kochetkov, an instructor in a zero gravity aircraft

Other cast members

- Maxim Stoyanov as Roman Biker, a mission candidate
- Benik Arakelyan as Rafik, a mission candidate
- Arthur Beschastnyy as Vasily 'Vasya', a mission candidate
- Andrey Kuzichev as Valery 'Valera', a mission candidate
- Sergey Godin as Pavel, a mission candidate
- Simon Steinberg as Kirill, a mission candidate
- Mikhail Troynik as Sergey, Zhenya Belyaeva's husband
- Varvara Volodina as Masha, Zhenya Belyaeva's daughter
- Danila Fedyunin as Borya, Masha's boyfriend
- Sofya Skya as Tatiana 'Tanya', an anesthesiologist
- Marianna Korobeynikova as Ksenia Bogdanova, wife of cosmonaut Oleg Bogdanov

== Production ==
=== Background and pre-production ===
The screening process began on 15 March 2021, as a joint project between Russia's federal space corporation Roscosmos, the state-controlled television network Channel One and production company Yellow, Black and White. The streaming service START took part in partnership with Tinkoff Bank and MegaFon, a company supported by the Cinema Fund Russia. The filming equipment was launched on Progress MS-17 and returned on Soyuz MS-18.

According to Konstantin Ernst, Director General of Channel One, the filmmakers wanted to confirm Russia's power in the space sector and restore the prestige of the cosmonaut profession in the eyes of the younger generation (as an example, Yulia Peresild herself did not dream of spaceflight as a child). The unique experience of express training for non-professional flight may subsequently be useful for sending scientists or doctors into space on an urgent basis. The development of the project was covered within the framework of the "Evening Urgant" program, whose members moved to the cosmodrome a week before launch.

About three thousand applications were submitted for the main role, for which Peresild was ultimately chosen. The number of which was reduced to 20–30.

"We selected 20 candidates, and Yulia was not included in this list, because she was filming in another project. As a result, after all the tests of the medical board, all these actresses did not pass the selection. Not because they are ill, but because they are not suitable for flights." —Konstantin Ernst, at the end of the filming of the series Gloomy River

Aside from Peresild, Ernst offered the role to the Russian singer Polina Gagarina.

On 14 May, the Interagency Committee approved the composition of the ISS main and alternate crews for the period 2021–2023. Cosmonaut Anton Shkaplerov was chosen to be the ship's commander, while Klim Shipenko and Peresild flew as spaceflight participants. The backup crew was cosmonaut Oleg Artemyev, cameraman Alexei Dudin and actress Alyona Mordovina, Mordovina being the first woman to pass the cosmonaut screening since 2012. Due to the allocation of seats on flights to the International Space Station, the flight of the director and actress necessitated rearranging mission lengths of the professional astronauts and cosmonauts, including extending the mission length of the on-orbit crew, U.S. astronaut Mark Vande Hei and his Russian cosmonaut counterparts, from six months to 1 year.

The crew members began training at the Yuri Gagarin Cosmonaut Training Center on 24 May. To prepare for filming, Shipenko trained intensively, dropping 15 kilograms (33 lb) of weight. On 23 July, the prime crew participated in a four-hour simulation inside a Soyuz replica while wearing the Sokol space suit, and on 28 July, the back-up crew completed the same exercise. According to backup commander Artemyev, the performance of the two backup spaceflight participants was outstanding.

The dress rehearsals for the movie took place after the scheduled spaceflight training each day. On 30 July, the spacecraft had its pre-launch preparation started, and on 31 August, the medical committee announced that both the main and reserve crew were healthy for spaceflight.

On 12 September, First Channel aired a reality show called The Challenge: The First in Space, about the specifics of the selection and training of project participants.

=== In space ===
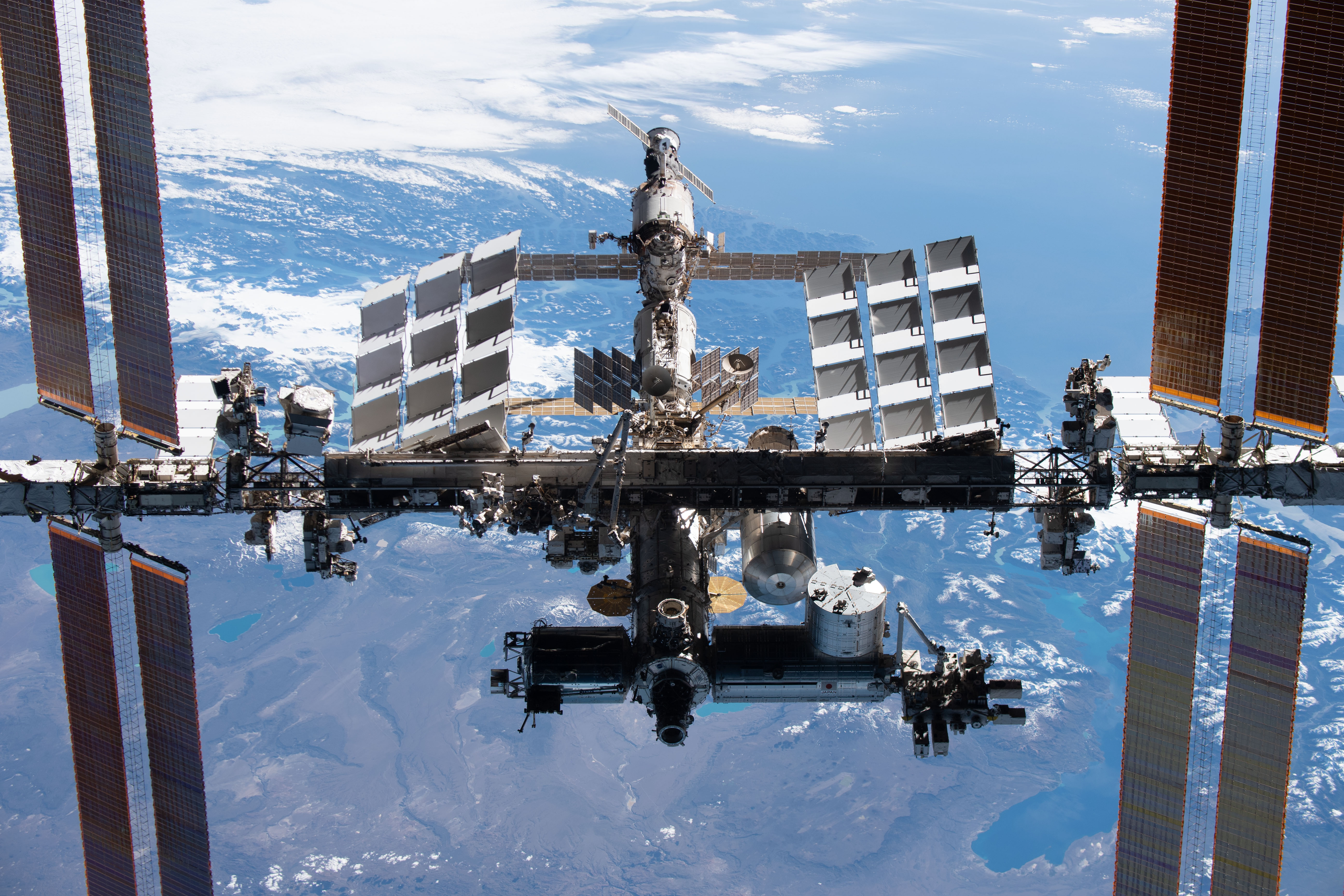
A portion of the production took place on the International Space Station.

"In space, there are a lot of nuances, the whole process is arranged differently. Therefore, many of the shots that we worked on the earth had to be rethought: to change the movements, the mise en scene."

— Klim Shipenko

Principal photography began on 5 October, when Shkaplerov, Peresild, and Shipenko flew to the ISS aboard the Soyuz-2.1a launch vehicle with the Soyuz MS-19 crewed transport spacecraft from the Baikonur Cosmodrome in Baikonur, Kazakhstan. While on the ISS, Klim Shipenko shot about 30 hours of material, and also worked as director, art director, makeup artist, and production designer. Oleg Novitsky and Pyotr Dubrov appear in the film, with Dubrov and Mark Vande Hei assisting in the production. Shkaplerov will also appear in some scenes.

Of all the footage filmed in space, about 30% was filmed in the Nauka module, another third was filmed in the Zvezda module, and the remaining 30% was shot on the rest of the ISS modules. The footage shot in space became approximately 35 minutes of the final runtime of the film.

They left the ISS on 17 October aboard Soyuz MS-18, with Commander Oleg Novitsky. After the successful landing of Soyuz MS-18, Dmitry Rogozin revealed that Ernst had paid Roscosmos for Shipenko and Peresild's seats.

=== Post-flight ===
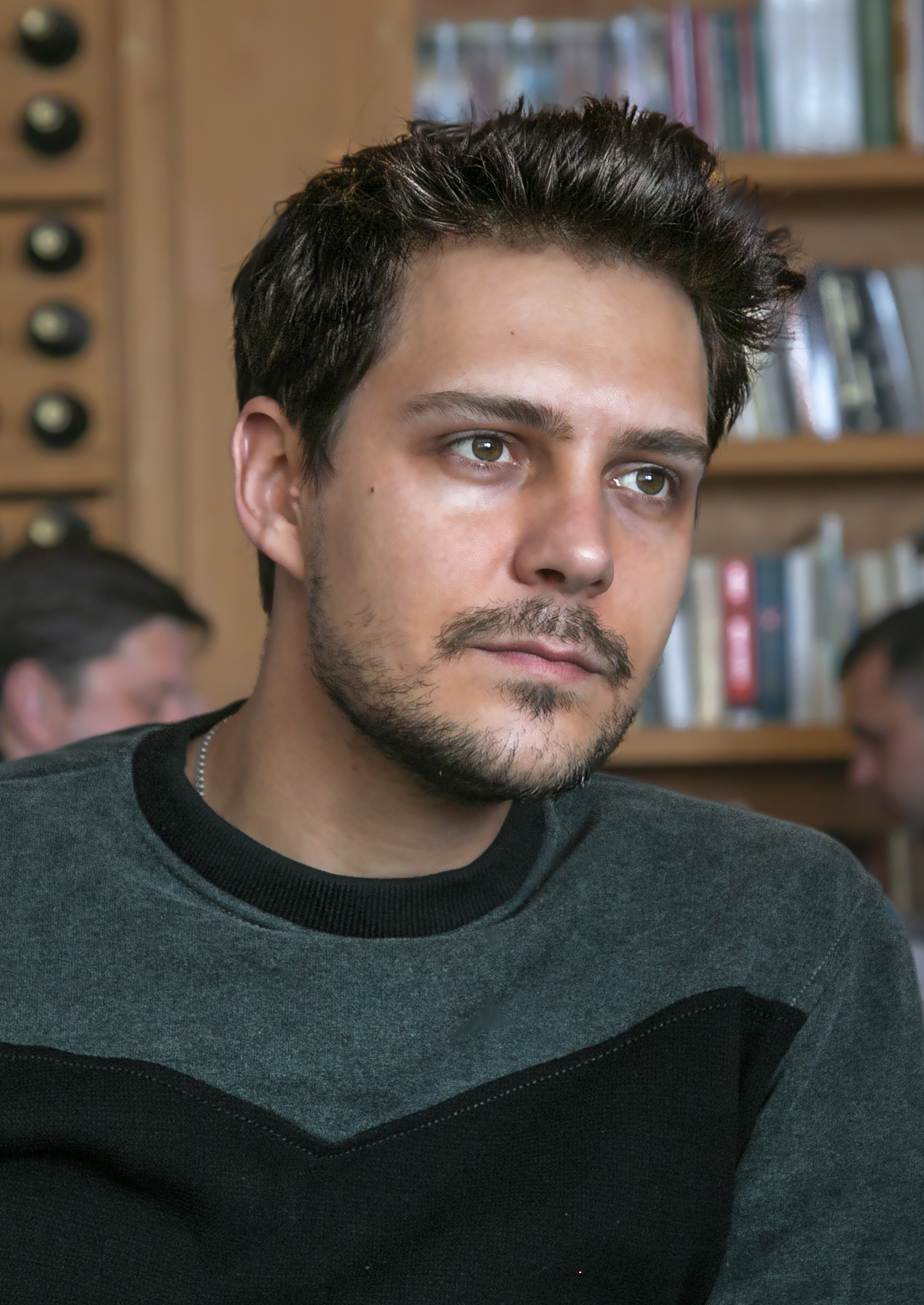
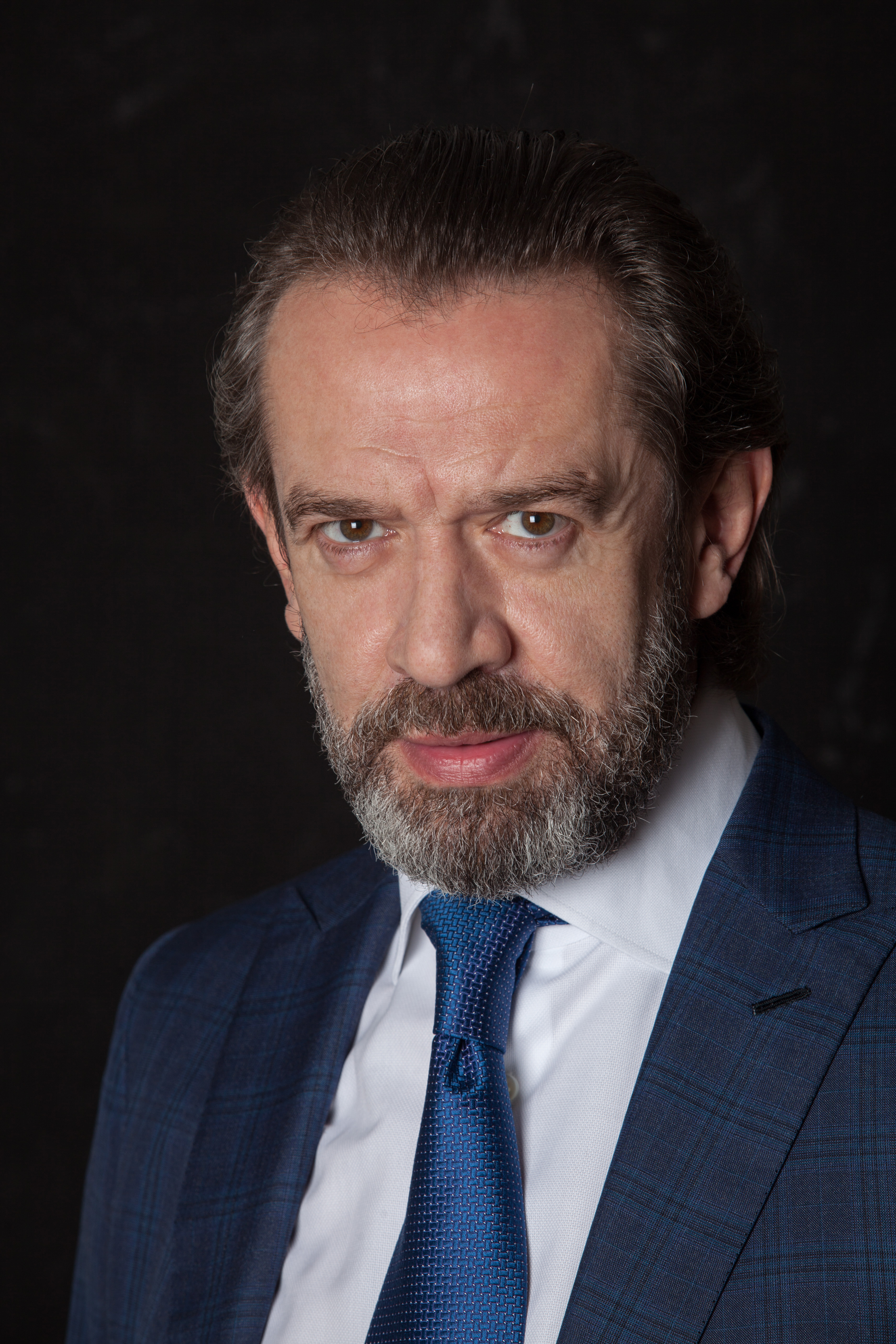
Miloš Biković (left) and Vladimir Mashkov (right), who play the lead male roles in Moscow in 2022

The ground-based filming started in Moscow and the region of Moscow Oblast in mid-June 2022 and ended in October, with the last footage filmed at the Baikonur Cosmodrome. Some of the locations the crew filmed were the Yuri Gagarin Cosmonaut Training Center and the Voronovo sanatorium. In addition, a pavilion was erected specifically for the film, imitating the RKA Mission Control Center of the Roscosmos State Corporation. There, Miloš Biković, the star of Klim Shipenko's 2019 film Serf, joined the cast.

== Reactions ==
According to Dmitry Rogozin, then head of Roscosmos, the film was an "experiment to see if Roscosmos can prepare two ordinary people to fly in about 3 or 4 months". However, filming aboard the International Space Station was widely criticized by Russian cosmonauts and space scientists, who argued that it disrupted the Russian space program and misused public funds.

Sergei Krikalev, director of crewed programs at Roscosmos and a veteran of six spaceflights, reportedly lost his position after speaking out against the project, but was reinstated ten days later following protests from cosmonauts both on active duty and retired.

== Release ==
=== Marketing ===
On New Year's Eve, Channel One released the first musical number, and the first teaser trailer was released on 1 January 2023. The second trailer was released on 7 March 2023.

On 6 April 2023, the premiere took place on Okhotny Ryad Street, under the descent module of the Soyuz MS-18 spacecraft that was installed near Manezhnaya Square, Moscow.

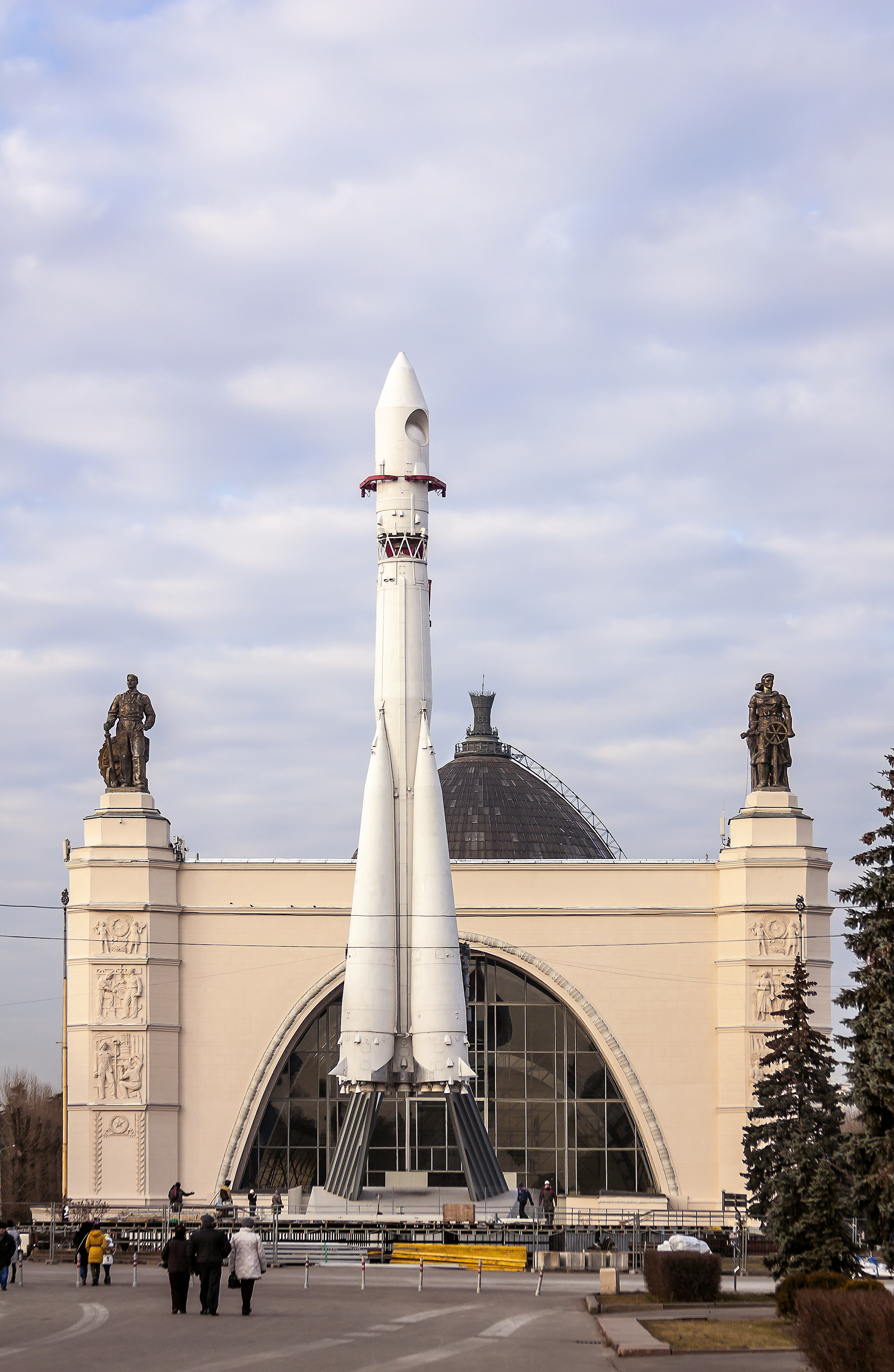
Vostok carrier rocket from the Cosmos Pavilion No. 32

On 10 April, the Cosmos Pavilion No. 32 at the Exhibition of Achievements of National Economy hosted the presentation and cancellation ceremony for a new postage stamp, part of the country's "Modern Russian Cinematography" series, depicting the movie's poster art. The 30-ruble stamp was issued the following Friday to coincide with the film's theatrical release and was accompanied by special postal cancellations at stations in Moscow, Star City and Korolyov in the Moscow Oblast, and elsewhere in Perm, Chelyabinsk and Baikonur.

To minimize competition with other films, foreign films such as The Super Mario Bros. Movie and Dungeons & Dragons: Honor Among Thieves were temporarily removed from the cinema schedule during the rental period.

The tagline is "Become a star, by flying to the stars!"

=== Theatrical ===
The Challenge was released by Central Partnership, which is part of the Gazprom-Media holding in the Russian Federation. As reported by Vedomosti, Central Partnership has developed a new cinema format that contains technical characteristics similar to IMAX, called CosMAX.

The film had a special screening on 12 April 2023 at a solemn event for politicians dedicated to Cosmonautics Day at the State Kremlin Palace, as well as its world premiere at the Karo 11 October cinema center on New Arbat Avenue in Moscow. The film had its Serbian premiere on 20 April at the Cineplexx Galerija in Belgrade, and it was scheduled to be released theatrically at the Baikonur Cosmodrome in Kazakhstan and the Russian Federation on 20 April 2023.

The Challenge premiered on 2 May in a promotional video showing the cast and crew's impressions of space. They were joined by cosmonauts Dmitry Petelin, Sergey Prokopyev and Andrey Fedyaev, and seven other American and Emirati astronauts, all of whom had seen the film onboard the ISS.

=== Home media ===
The Challenge was released on digital rental in Russia on 1 September 2023, on the Start platform.

== Reception ==
The film's advertising budget was 91 million rubles, according to Mediaplus Group Russia. The Challenge was promoted mainly on Channel One, and the state portal Gosuslugi also sent out letters advertising the film.

=== Box office ===
Having been released at the same time as the films John Wick: Chapter 4 and To Catch a Killer, in its first weekend, The Challenge took first place at the Russian box office and the CIS countries, earning a total box office revenue of 426 million rubles. In its second weekend, the film again became the leader: as of 3 May 2023, the film's box office receipts reached 1 billion rubles. On 7 August 2023, the film crossed the 2 billion rubles in 15 weeks, which is estimated to be the mark in Russia.

=== Critical response ===
In Russian media, reception was mixed, leaning towards positive. Film critics praised the visuals and Peresild's acting, but were divided about the melodramatic parts of the plot, supposed ideology, and how the movie deals with representation of women in space. Some critics took issue with the very idea of a costly space filming, while others praised it as an achievement. The Challenge was praised in reviews by Nezavisimaya Gazeta, KinoPoisk, and Lenta.ru, among others, while reviews in Kommersant and Film.ru were less enthusiastic, and Afisha was sharply critical.

=== Accolades ===
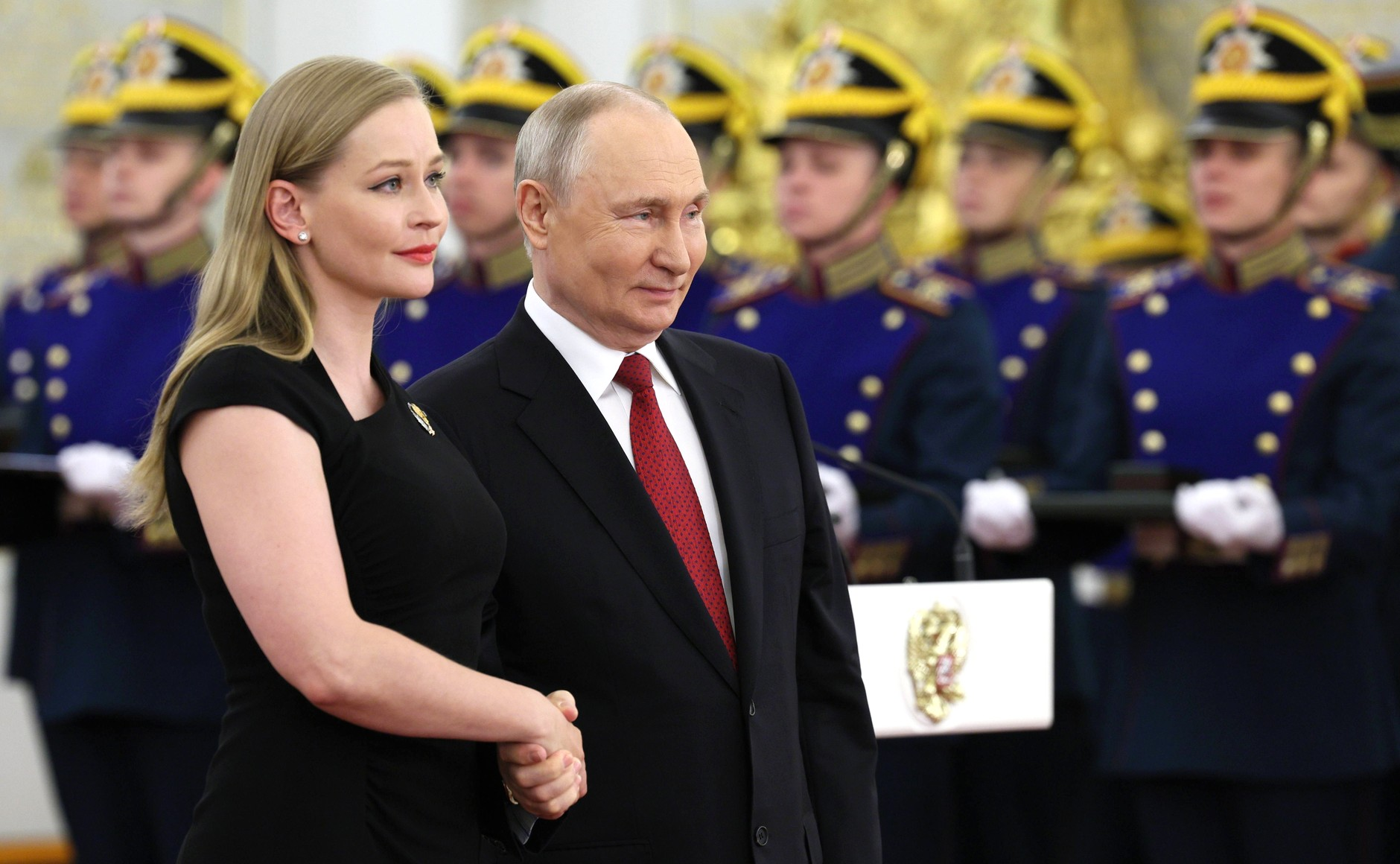
Peresild with Putin at award ceremonies in June 2023

During Russia Day festivities in the Grand Kremlin Palace’s St George Hall, President Vladimir Putin, on 12 June 2023, awarded Shipenko and Peresild a state prize in the field of literature and art for the film, though Shipenko could not attend due to work obligations.

In November 2023, the film was recognized as the best project in the nomination of the Event of the Year award by KinoReporter magazine.

In 2023, the film received a nomination at the Golden Trailer Awards in the category Best Foreign Trailer.

The film was nominated for the Golden Rooster Awards in the category of Best Foreign Language Film.

The film was nominated for the Nika Award in the category Best Film, and Yulia Peresild won the award for Best Actress.

The film received five nominations at the Golden Eagle Award: Best Visual Effects, Best Sound, Best Film Editing, Best Actress, and Best Feature Film.

The film received awards from the Russian APKIT Awards (the professional prize of the Association of Film and Television Producers) in the categories Best Feature Film and Special Prize.

== See also ==
- List of movies filmed in space
- List of films featuring space stations
