= Serf 2 =

Serf 2 Son of a Rich 2
- Theatrical release poster
- Directed by: Klim Shipenko
- Written by: Darya Gratsevich (ru); Anton Morozenko; Dmitry Permyakov
- Produced by: Eduard Iloyan (ru); Denis Zhalinsky (ru); Vitaly Shlyappo (ru); Alexey Trotsyuk (ru); Anton Zlatopolsky (ru); Vadim Vereshchagin; Taimuraz Badziev; David Tsallaev (ru); Vyacheslav Dusmukhametov (ru); Mikhail Tkachenko; Artur Badziev; Yevgeny Kazakov; Darya Gratsevich (ru); Anton Morozenko; Dmitry Permyakov
- Starring: Miloš Biković; Aglaya Tarasova; Ivan Okhlobystin; Aleksandr Samoylenko (ru); Maria Mironova; Natalya Rogozhkina (ru); Oleg Komarov; Olga Dibtseva; Kirill Nagiyev; Sergey Sotserdotsky; Sophia Zayka; Mikhail Babichev; Pavel Derevyanko
- Cinematography: Yuri Korobeinikov; Philip Yuzhanin
- Edited by: Tim Pavelko
- Music by: Ivan Burlyaev (ru); Dmitry Noskov
- Production companies: Yellow, Black and White; Mem Media (MEM Cinema Production); Central Partnership Productions; Russia-1; START Studio; Cinema Fund
- Distributed by: Central Partnership
- Release dates: December 21, 2023 (Karo 11 October); January 1, 2024 (Russia)
- Running time: 119 minutes
- Country: Russia
- Language: Russian
- Budget: ₽768 million
- Box office: ₽3.842 billion (US$49,373,406)

Serf 2, also known as Son of a Rich 2 (Russian: Холоп 2) is a 2023 Russian comedy film directed by Klim Shipenko and produced by Yellow, Black and White. It is a sequel to the 2019 film Serf and stars Miloš Biković, Ivan Okhlobystin, Aleksandr Samoylenko, and Maria Mironova, were joined by Aglaya Tarasova and Natalya Rogozhkina. Principal photography took place in the Pskov region, in the vicinity of Pushkin Mountains and in Saint Petersburg.

The plot of the film follows immediately after Serf. The reformed major Grisha decides to teach a lesson to the spoiled and arrogant daughter of an official, Katya. From the unbelted princess, she turns into Cinderella and wakes up in 1812.

The film premiered in Moscow on December 21, 2023, and was theatrically released in Russia on January 1, 2024, by Central Partnership. It received mixed reviews from journalists, with praise for the film's scale while criticism was aimed at its lack of originality. The film was commercially successful, grossing ₽3.8 billion at the box office, against its ₽768 million budget.

A sequel to the film, Serf 3, is planned for release in June 2026.

== Plot ==
While celebrating her birthday in Saint Petersburg, a drunken Katya throws people along the river Moyka into the water. She was arrested for hooliganism but steals a police boat in the process. She loses control and crashes the police boat into a cafe on the shore. Katya was sentenced to two years in prison but being the daughter of Saint Petersburg's official Tatyana Vasilievna Novikova, she was sent to the United Arab Emirates instead.

The drunken swim in St. Petersburg did not go unnoticed by Grisha, who was the same "major", but was re-educated thanks to the specially erected scenery of a Russian village from the 19th century in the Russian Empire. It was a project of psychologist Lev Arnoldovich. Imagine Grigory's surprise when he again accidentally encountered a tipsy Katya, this time on board a private plane when she was supposed to serve her sentence. Without asking his father's permission, the guy was eager to "help" the girl re-educate, to go through the same path of correction as he himself.

Grisha enlisted the support of old acquaintances of actors who had previously performed roles for the play for its corrective purposes, but none of them liked this idea, since everyone feared the wrath of an important official. The self-confident young man took all the risks and asked him to trust him. Thus began a new performance with scenery - this time for Katya. Having waited for the right moment, the conspirators tranquilize the girl on the road and kidnap her. She comes to her senses while in the barn, naturally not understanding what is happening at all.

Grisha's initiative begins to fall apart at the seams, since he is an unimportant screenwriter and does not enjoy authority among the group. It becomes clear that without the leadership of Lev Arnoldovich the plan will fail. While Grisha almost burns Katya alive for correctional purposes, the team contacts the former leader. And at that time he was dealing with the parents of the former "serf", who decided to divorce. Pavel, the guy's father is horrified by his son's prank and tries to quickly end the event. However, Lev, who misses the interesting work, supports the new project and again becomes a director.

First of all, the shocked Katya is introduced to her despotic stepmother, played by Pavel's wife, as well as her half-sister Aglaya and maid Lyuba. However, despite the humiliation she has experienced, the “major girl” is in no hurry to draw any conclusions for herself. In addition, Tatyana Vasilievna, accompanied by security, is already following her daughter's trail. The decorators have to urgently abandon their village, and, at Lev's suggestion, they move the action to a luxurious palace, which Pavel recently bought.

While Pavel is distracting the official's attention, the others are hastily preparing everything for the ball organized by the "prince" in honor of the guest. Grisha has to play the role of the prince. The girl gets into the atmosphere. She sews her own dress and learns French. The enraged Tatyana Vasilievna threatens the enthusiasts with huge troubles, and she has to be put in the basement, where the image from the ball is shown to her. The woman gradually begins to change her mind regarding Grisha's idea.

According to Lev's plan, for Katya's final re-education it is necessary to accomplish a feat. The group stages an attack by Napoleon's troops. In front of the girl, “the prince dies,” and she herself is taken to the emperor. The producers fear that Katya will defect to the French side, but instead she tries to shoot “Napoleon”.

The story behind the production is revealed. Katya is horrified, but now she understands how wrong she was. She hugs her mother warmly, says "thank you" and thanks Grisha. They become a couple.

== Cast ==
- Miloš Biković as Gregory 'Grisha', this is a gentleman actor, a.k.a. "Count Grigory Pavlovich Dostoevsky"
- Aglaya Tarasova as Ekaterina 'Katya' Novikova / "Cinderella" - now she is no longer a serf, she is also "young lady Ekaterina 'Katya' Dmitrievna Timofeeva"
- Ivan Okhlobystin as Lev Arnoldovich, a psychologist, Anastasia's ex-husband
- Aleksandr Samoylenko as Pavel, a large businessman, Grisha's father, and this is an actor, a.k.a. "Count Pavel Sergeevich Dostoevsky"
- Maria Mironova as Anastasia, former television producer, Pavel's second wife, and this is an actress, a.k.a. "Katya's mother"
- Natalya Rogozhkina as Tatyana Novikova, a major government official, Katya's mother
- Oleg Komarov as an actor, a.k.a. "master Dmitry Alexeevich Timofeev" and "Katya's stepfather"
- Olga Dibtseva as Polina is an actress, a.k.a. "young lady Aglaya Dmitrievna Timofeeva", the master's daughter and "Katya's half-sister"
- Kirill Nagiyev as Anton is an actor, a.k.a. "Count Grigory Pavlovich Dostoevsky’s lackey"
- Sergey Sotserdotsky as Artyom is an actor, a.k.a. "Proshka", a stableman and "Hussar", etc.
- Sophia Zayka as Svetlana is an actress, a.k.a. "Lyuba", a courtyard woman
- Mikhail Babichev as an actor, a.k.a. "Avdey Mikhalych"
- Pavel Derevyanko as an actor, a.k.a. "Napoleon Bonaparte"

Supporting cast

- Sergey Abroskin as the author of the script
- Pyotr Buslov as a director in the penal colony
- Dmitry Permyakov as a sniper
- Anton Morozenko as a Russian policeman
- Andrey Malakhov as himself (cameo appearance)
- Ernest Mackevičius as himself, host of the Vesti program (cameo appearance)
- Olga Kovylina as an actress, a.k.a. "Katya's Russian etiquette teacher"
- Olivier Siou as a cameo and actor, a.k.a. "Napoleon's translator"
- Miguel (credited as Sergei Shesteperov) as an actor, a.k.a. an eccentric dance teacher from Paris
- Elizaveta Lotova as a flight attendant
- Sergey Korenkov as a prosecutor
- Mikhail Lokshin as a master of ceremonies
- Tatyana Andreeva as a judge
- Anton Demidov as a journalist in court
- Alyona Mordovina as a woman guest at eco-hotel
- Sergey Bachiu as a man guest at eco-hotel
- Viki Odintcova as Alina
- Nikolai Pinsky as a construction worker

== Production ==
=== Casting ===
The cast, which the audience liked, was not only preserved, but also supplemented with bright shots. The role of the major Katya, who will have to change, finding herself in unusual conditions, will be played by Aglaya Tarasova.

More than 300 professional re-enactors were hired for the climactic scene at the end. The crowd involved over 200 actors in historical costumes corresponding to the period of the Patriotic War of 1812. The director sought to ensure maximum authenticity, even if the battle was a sham in the plot. Klim Shipenko admitted that he reviewed all the film adaptations of "War and Peace" and "Anna Karenina" in order to cope with this new task for him.

=== Filming ===
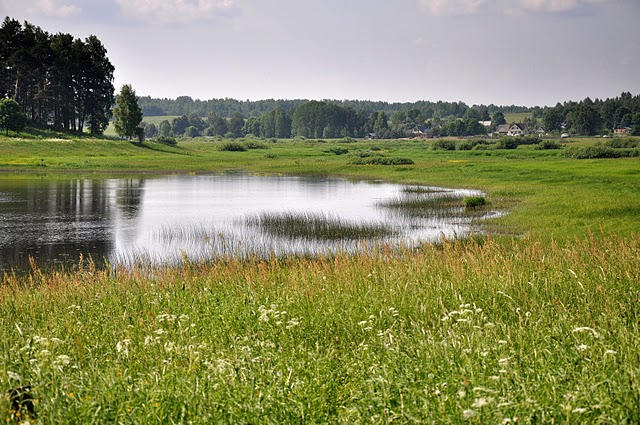
Pushkinskiye Gory scenery is translated as Pushkin Mountains.

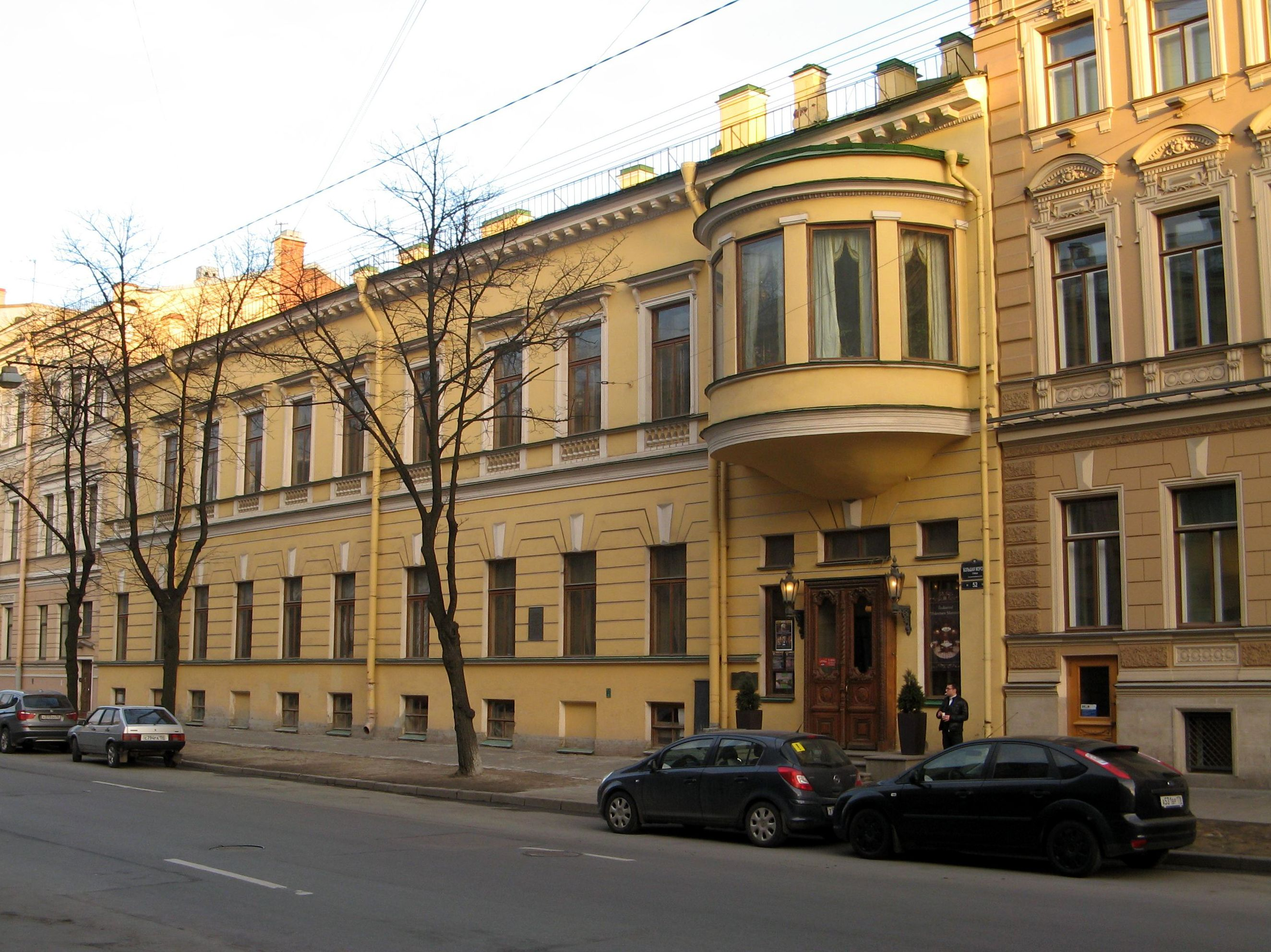
The historic Polovtsov Mansion (or Polovtzev Mansion) is now St. Petersburg's House of Architects.

Klim Shipenko, the sequel to the highest-grossing comedy in Russian history. Principal photography of the second part of the Serf produced by the studio Yellow, Black and White, the online cinema START Studio and MEM Cinema Production with the participation of the television channel "Russia-1", the film company "Central Partnership Productions" and with the support of the Cinema Foundation started in the urban-type settlement of Pushkinskiye Gory (transl. Pushkin Mountains), Pushkinogorsky District, Pskov Oblast and the nearby film village. This was reported by the press service of the distributor Central Partnership.

The filming took place in Saint Petersburg, which was ideal for simulating that time. Magnificent balls were filmed in the Marble Palace, a dance hall and a library in the House of Architects and the House of Scientists, and scenes on the water were filmed on the Neva and the Griboyedov Canal.

== Release ==
The premiere was originally scheduled for December 21, 2023, but was then postponed to January 1, 2024.

=== Marketing ===
The first teaser trailer and a teaser poster for the New Year's comedy Serf 2 with a release date have been published.

=== Theatrical ===
Serf 2 premiered at the Karo 11 October cinema center on New Arbat Avenue in Moscow on December 21, 2023. The film was theatrically released by Central Partnership in the Russian Federation on January 1, 2024.

== Reception ==
The film was commercially successful, grossing ₽3.8 billion at the box office, against its ₽768 million budget.

=== Critical response ===
Serf 2 could not fully meet the expectations of critics. Despite the success of the first part, the second part received mixed reviews from critics, who praised the acting and the scale of the film, but criticized the unoriginality and soullessness of the project. The plot, which is a complete copy of the previous film, also attracted some criticism. On the Criticism website, the film received 54% approval based on 6 reviews, which is significantly less than the first part.

At the same time, from a financial point of view, the film started at the box office much more confidently than the first part. The box office mark of 2 billion rubles was reached in 6 days of release, while the first part took 2 weeks.

"Meduza" was skeptical about the second film, noting the high-quality editing and prettier picture; a significant part of the review was devoted to the blandness of the script and the director's indecisiveness in political satire, which was much more in the original.

== Sequel ==
Some details about the new installment of the comedy franchise. Screenwriters: Savva Minaev, Klim Shipenko, and Maxim Kudymov.

The plot centers on timeless themes: love, parent-child relationships, and the continuity of generations. A married couple, played by Pavel Priluchny and Kristina Asmus, undergoes re-education. Their own children become the instigators of positive changes, taking their parents back to the time of Peter the Great. Miloš Biković will return to the lead role.

Produced by: Yellow, Black and White Studios, START Studio, Russia-1, with the participation of Mem Media and Central Partnership.
