= Miloš Biković =

Serbian actor and producer

- Милош Биковић
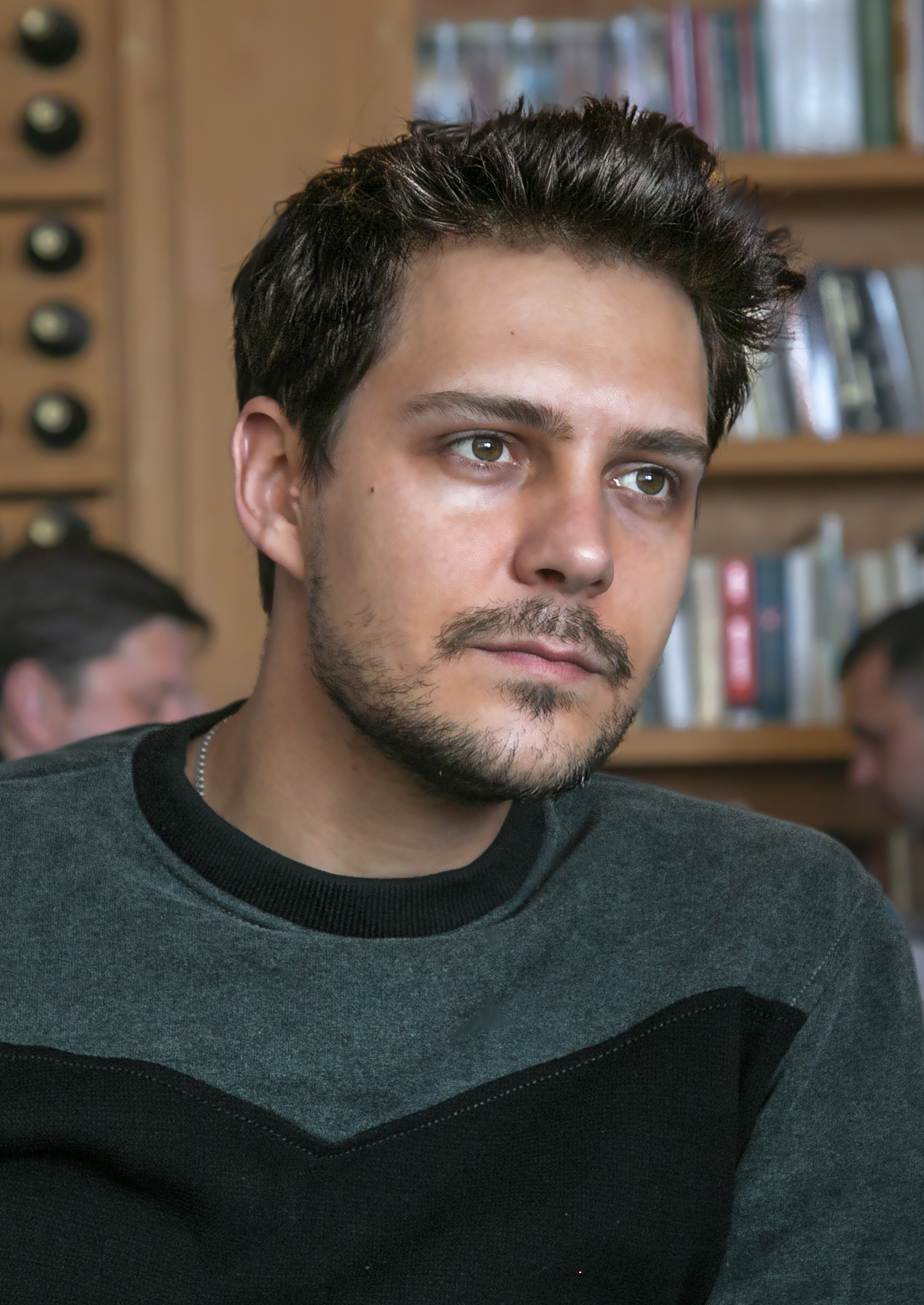
- Biković in 2019
- Born: January 13, 1988 (age 38); Belgrade, SR Serbia, SFR Yugoslavia
- Citizenship: Serbia; Russia
- Education: University of Arts in Belgrade
- Occupations: Actor; producer
- Years active: 2004–present
- Partners: Sasha Luss; Aglaya Tarasova (2017–2018); Barbara Tatalović (2019–2020); Ivana Malić (2021–present)
- Children: 1

Miloš Biković (Serbian Cyrillic: Милош Биковић; Russian: Милош Бикович; born January 13, 1988) is a Serbian and Russian actor and producer. His best known films are box office hits South Wind (2018), Serf (2019), Serf 2 and The Challenge (both 2023).

Biković initially gained recognition for his roles in Sunstroke (2014), Dukhless 2 (2015), and Beyond the Edge (2018). In 2020, he launched his own production company Archangel Digital Studios. He is the president of the Cinematography Group of the Serbian Chamber of Commerce and a member of the European Film Academy (EFA) since 2023.

== Early life and education ==
Miloš Biković was born on January 13, 1988, in Belgrade, Serbia (then SR Serbia, SFR Yugoslavia). After his parents' divorce, which occurred when Miloš was very young, his father moved to Germany and Biković was left to live with his mother in Serbia. He has an older brother named Mihailo, who became a Serbian Orthodox monk. At age 11, Miloš survived the NATO bombardment of Belgrade, hiding with his family members in a shelter.

Miloš is from partial Macedonian origin on his grandfather's side who was from Berovo, North Macedonia.

Miloš graduated from the XIV Gymnasium of Belgrade and speaks fluent Serbian, English and Russian. As of 2011, he was pursuing his PhD at the University of Arts in Belgrade.

== Acting career ==
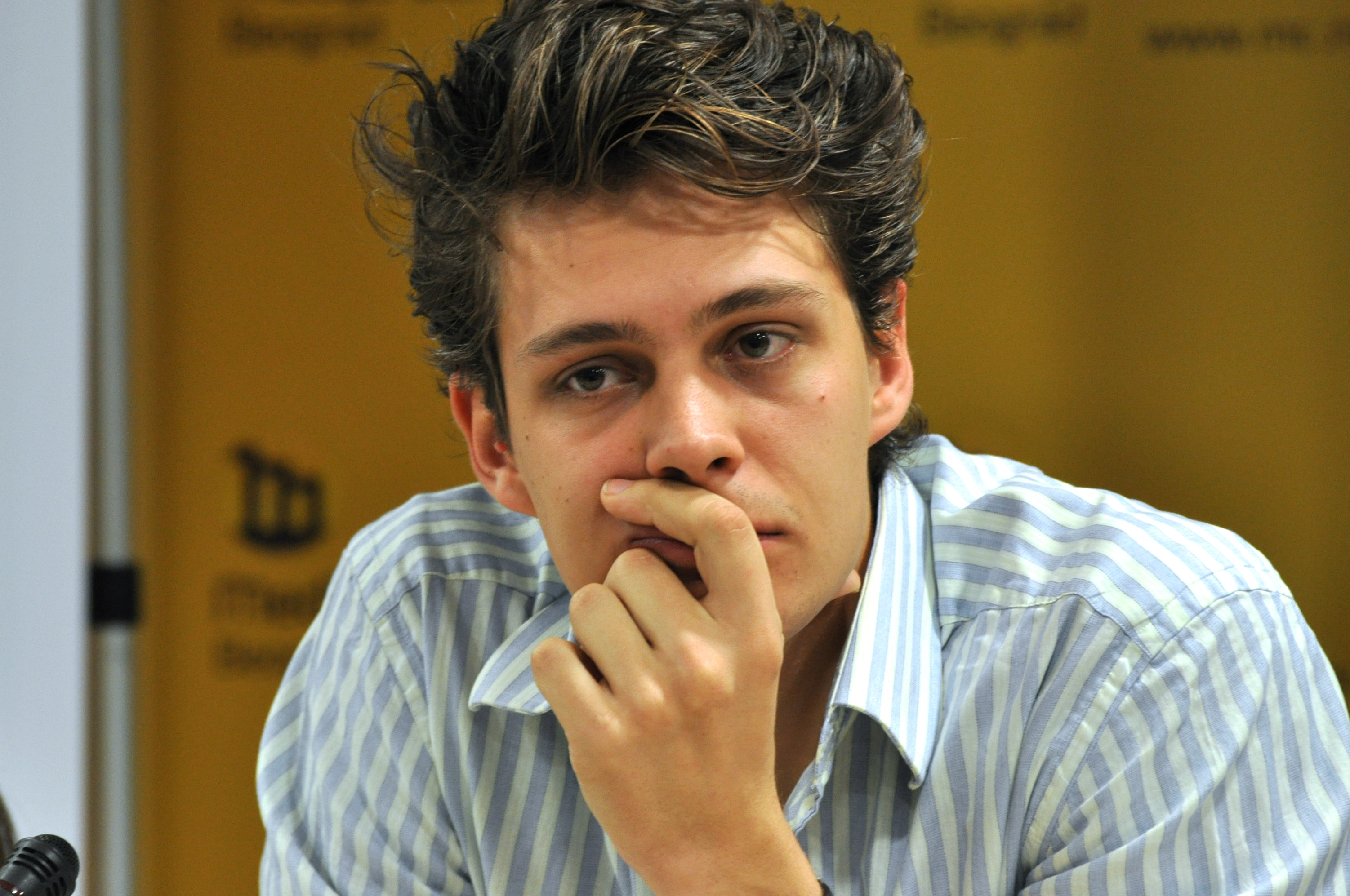
Biković in 2011

Biković made his acting debut on television, in the popular RTS series The Dollars Are Coming (Serbian Cyrillic: Стижу долари). He came to further prominence with the comedy series White Ship (Bela lađa), in which he acted from 2006 to 2011. In 2008, Biković had a supporting role in the B92 drama series The Storks Will Return (Vratiće se rode). He subsequently appeared in two short films, Assignment: Ten Minutes (Zadatak: 10 minuta) in 2009, and Plus in 2010.

In 2010, Biković was cast to portray Serbian footballer Aleksandar "Tirke" Tirnanić in Montevideo, God Bless You! (Montevideo, Bog te video!). Directed by Dragan Bjelogrlić, it is the true story of the Yugoslavia national football team qualifying for the 1930 FIFA World Cup. Biković and his castmates had to learn to play football for the film. Montevideo, God Bless You! premiered on 20 December 2010, and became the highest-grossing film in Serbia and the Balkan region. It was also selected as the Serbian entry for the Best Foreign Language Film at the 84th Academy Awards. The film brought Biković MTV Adria Movie Award and Niš Film Festival for Best Actor, as well as a FIPRESCI Serbia Award for Best Actor nomination. It also made him a household name in Serbia, and earned him the Hello! Magazine Award for the Personality of the Year in 2011. The television series adapted from Montevideo, God Bless You!, which features some scenes and characters that do not appear in the original film, premiered on the RTS on 13 February 2012.

The following year, Biković had an episode appearance in the television series Mixed Meat (Mešano meso). He also made his stage debut in the Atelje 212 production Goodbye SFRY (Zbogom SFRJ), inspired by Wolfgang Becker's film Good Bye, Lenin! In 2012, Biković portrayed Serbian scientist Mihailo Petrović Alas in Professor Kosta Vujic's Hat (Šešir profesora Koste Vujića), a film adaptation of the novel of the same name by Milovan Vitezović directed by Zdravko Šotra. The film was critically acclaimed and commercially successful.

In 2013, Biković starred the RTS series Ravna Gora that takes place in Yugoslavia during World War II and tells the story of the Chetnik resistance movement, the National Theatre production of The Lady of the Camellias, and the German independent short film Great. The following year, he starred in the sequel to Montevideo, God Bless You!, the box-office hit See You in Montevideo (Montevideo, vidimo se!) and its eponymous spin-off series, and the film and television adaptation of Mir-Jam's novel Single in a Marriage (Samac u braku), titled, respectively, When Love Is Late (Kad ljubav zakasni) and Single in a Marriage.

Biković appeared in Sunstroke (2014), which marked his Russian debut, a film directed by Nikita Mikhalkov, based on Ivan Bunin's works Sunstroke and Cursed Days. He also appeared in Dukhless 2 (2015). Biković also acted in the 2018 films Ice and Beyond the Edge.

During 2018, Biković also acted in the movies Ice and Beyond the Edge with Antonio Banderas, Mify and TV series Hotel Eleon, which represent sequel of the famous and successful TV comedy Kitchen. Role of Pavel in series Hotel Eleon brought him a status of star in Russia, Kazakhstan, Azerbaijan and rest of the former USSR countries. In Russia he received the Medal of Pushkin award.

In 2018, Biković appeared in the leading role of the movie The South Wind, directed by Miloš Avramović, which earned a record number of unique views. In 2020, he also appeared in a television series of the same name.

In 2019, Biković appeared in the leading role of the movie The Balkan Line, based on true stories. A Russian-Serbian action movie, directed by Andrei Vologin, is dedicated to the secret operation to take over Slatina airport in Kosovo and Metohija during the 1999 NATO bombing in FR Yugoslavia. At the end of 2019, Biković had a leading role in the movie Servant, which became the most viewed movie in the history of cinema of Russia. In only one day, the movie was seen by more than 750,000 people. The movie was directed by Klim Shipenko. The sequel, Serf 2, was one of the top earning Russian films of 2024.

In 2020, Biković starred in the Russian-Serbian romantic comedy Hotel Belgrade alongside Jakov Jevtović and Miodrag Radonjić.

In 2023, Biković played the male lead in the first feature film shot in space, The Challenge. It was one of the most successful films at the Russian box-office in 2023.

In January 2024, Biković was cast in the third season of HBO television series The White Lotus. The casting was criticized by the Ukrainian government, who accused him of being a supporter of the Russian invasion of Ukraine, while the Serbian foreign ministry called the Ukrainian accusations "unfounded". He was eventually dropped from the casting on February 2.

== Other work ==
Biković and his Montevideo, God Bless You! fellows played football for various humanitarian causes, such as the Battle for Babies on 27 September 2011. Along with Vlade Divac, Ana Divac, Nađa Higl and Marchelo, he took part in the Really Important campaign, led by the Vlade & Ana Divac Foundation. Biković also participated in Enter the Theatre! campaign; its task is to popularize theatre among the youth. In November 2012, Biković started Twitter Syndicate, a charity account on Twitter.

Biković and his Montevideo, God Bless You! fellow Tamara Dragičević appeared in the music video for Kiki Lesendrić's single "Slučajno", released in May 2011. In 2014, he starred in and directed the music video for Nevena Božović's song "Bal".

In February 2012, Biković and other Serbian celebrities presented the new model of BMW of the BMW 3 Series.

In 2016, he founded a production company Archangel studios and produced 4 projects South Wind, The Balkan Line, Embasy, and Hotel Belgrade.

== Personal and media life ==
Biković maintains that religion plays an important role in his life.

Biković has been a close friend of his Montevideo, God Bless You! fellow Petar Strugar. Biković cited Zoran Radmilović as his role model, and has Fyodor Dostoyevsky as his favourite writer.

== Filmography ==
Year	Title	Original title	Role	Notes
2004	The Dollars Are Coming	Stižu dolari	Nebojša Ljutić	TV series; 2004–05
2006	White Ship	Bela lađa	Filip Pantić	TV series; 2006–11
2008	The Storks Will Return	Vratiće se rode	Filip	TV series
2009	Assignment: 10 Minutes	Zadatak: 10 minuta	Milan	Short film
2010	Plus	Plus	Vuk	Short film
2010	Montevideo, God Bless You!	Montevideo, Bog te video!	Aleksandar Tirnanić	
2011	Mixed Meat	Mešano meso	Dosadnjaković	TV series; 1 episode
2012	Professor Kosta Vujic's Hat	Šešir profesora Koste Vujića	Mihailo Petrović Alas	
2012	Montevideo, God Bless You!	Montevideo, Bog te video!	Aleksandar Tirnanić	TV series
2013	On the Road to Montevideo	Na putu za Montevideo	Aleksandar Tirnanić	TV series
2013	Great	—N/a	Nikola Radošević	Short film
2012	Professor Kosta Vujic's Hat	Šešir profesora Koste Vujića	Mihailo Petrović Alas	TV series
2013	Ravna Gora	—N/a	2nd Lieutenant Garić	TV series
2014	When Love is Late	Kad ljubav zakasni	Radmilo Tomić	
2014	See You in Montevideo	Montevideo, vidimo se!	Aleksandar Tirnanić	
2014	Single in a Marriage	Samac u braku	Radmilo Tomić	TV series
2014	See You in Montevideo	Montevideo, vidimo se!	Aleksandar Tirnanić	TV series
2014	Sunstroke	Солнечный удар	Baron Nikolay Alexandrovich Gulbe-Levitsky	Russian debut
2015	Without Borders	Без границ	Gromov	
2015	We Will Be the World Champions	Bićemo prvaci sveta	Radomir Šaper	
2015	Soulless 2	Духless 2	Roman Belkin	
2018	Ice	Лёд	Vladimir Leonov, a pair skater	
2018	Beyond the Edge	За гранью реальности	Michael	
2018	South Wind	Južni vetar	Petar Maraš	
2019	Like Me a Million	Lajkuj me milion puta	Charlie	Short film
2019	The Balkan Line	Балканский рубеж	Vuk Petrović	
2019	Magomayev	Магомаев	Muslim Magomayev	TV series
2019	Serf	Холоп	Grisha / Serf	
2020–present	Balkan Shadows	Senke nad Balkanom	Josip Broz Tito	TV series
2020	Hotel Belgrade	Отель «Белград»	Pavle Arkadijevic	
2022	Desperate for Marriage	Хочу замуж	Sergei Navashin	
2022	The Telki	The Тёлки	Andrey Mirkin	TV series
2023	The Challenge	Вызов	Vladislav Nikolaev	
2024	Serf 2	Холоп 2	Grisha	
2024	The Great Tram Robbery	Budi bog sa nama	Bosko Tokin	
2024	Isolation	Izolacija	Jovan	
2024	Son's Will	Volja sinovljeva	Chief of the sour ones	
2025	Red Silk	Красный шёлк	Nikolai Garin	
2025	Alice in Wonderland	Алиса в Стране чудес	Alice's father / the Hatter	
2026	Serf 3	Холоп 3	Grisha	
2026	Rise of the Empire	Рождение империи	Alexander Danilovich Menshikov	

== Stage roles ==
Title	Original title	Year	Role	Production
Goodbye SFRY	Zbogom SFRJ	2011–12	Mladen Mitić	Theatre Atelje 212
—N/a	Moj sin samo malo sporije hoda	2013–14	Branko	Belgrade Drama Theatre
The Lady of the Camellias	Dama s kamelijama	2013–present	Armand Duvall	National Theatre in Belgrade
—N/a	Kad su cvetale tikve	2014–present	Ljuba Sretenović Vrapče	Belgrade Drama Theatre
Novel of Palilula	Palilulski roman	2015-	Sima	Belgrade Drama Theatre

== Awards and nominations ==
Award	Year	Category	Work	Result
FEDIS Television Festival Awards	2012	Best Actor	Montevideo, God Bless You!	Won
FIPRESCI Serbia Awards	2010	Best Actor	Montevideo, God Bless You!	Nominated
Hello Magazine Awards	2011	Personality of the Year	—N/a	Won
Hello Magazine Awards	2012	Personality of the Year	—N/a	Won
MTV Adria Movie Awards	2011	Best Actor	Montevideo, God Bless You!	Won
Niš Film Festival	2011	Best Actor	Montevideo, God Bless You!	Won
Niš Film Festival	2013	Best On-Screen Couple	On the Road to Montevideo	Won
Marul	2013	Award for "My son Walks A Little Slower"		
Gran pri "Naisa"	2018	Role of Petar Maras in "The South Wind"	The South Wind	
Medal od Pushkin	2018	President Vladimir Putin honored Bikovic		
Subtitle Spotlight European Film	2018	Role of Petar Maras in "The South Wind"	The South Wind	
Annual award	2019	Representing and promoting Serbia's culture		
