= Bird (2017 film) =

- Directed by: Ksenia Baskakova
- Written by: Yaroslava Pulinovich; Andrei Rumyantsev Ksenia Baskakova
- Produced by: Edouard Pichugin; Irina Baskakova
- Starring: Ivan Okhlobystin; Evdokia Malevskaya
- Cinematography: Dmitri Savinov
- Edited by: Aleksei Maklakov
- Production company: Lenfilm
- Release date: 18 May 2017
- Running time: 90 min.
- Country: Russia
- Language: Russian

Bird (Russian: Птица, romanized: Ptitsa) is a 2017 Russian musical drama film, directorial debut of Ksenia Baskakova.

The film's title is a pun; the lead characters surname is Ptitsyn, which is similar to the Russian word, "Ptitsa" (Птица), meaning "bird".

== Plot ==
All her life, teenage girl Katya (Evdokia Malevskaya) has to change hospitals because of having tuberculosis. Therefore, Katya has practically no friends, and the girl sees practically nothing except for the hospital walls. One day, a popular rock musician named Oleg (Ivan Okhlobystin) is admitted next room. The girl and the musician develop a close friendship which is to change both of their lives.

== Cast ==
- Ivan Okhlobystin - Oleg Ptitsyn
- Evdokia Malevskaya - Katya
- Anastasia Melnikova - mother of Katya
- Kirill Zakharov - Chief Physician
- Kirill Rubtsov - Mikhail
- Inna Gorbikova - Marina
- Garik Sukachov - angel
