= Love Does Not Love =

- Theatrical release poster
- Directed by: Klim Shipenko
- Written by: Klim Shipenko
- Produced by: Eduard Iloyan; Vitaliy Shlyappo; Denis Zhalinskiy; Aleksey Trotsyuk; Nikita Trynkin; Olga Kochetkova; Klim Shipenko
- Starring: Maksim Matveyev; Lyubov Aksyonova; Svetlana Khodchenkova; Yekaterina Vasilyeva; Sergey Gazarov; Aleksandr Ratnikov; Yuri Kolokolnikov
- Cinematography: Boris Litovchenko
- Edited by: Pavel Khanyutin
- Production companies: Patriot Productions; Yellow, Black and White-Group
- Distributed by: Central Partnership
- Release date: December 4, 2014
- Running time: 83 minutes
- Country: Russia
- Language: Russian
- Box office: $2.3 million

Love Does Not Love (Russian: Любит не любит, romanized: Lyubit ne lyubit) is a 2014 Russian romantic comedy film is a relationship cheating. The film is directed by Klim Shipenko, stars Maksim Matveyev, Lyubov Aksyonova, and Svetlana Khodchenkova.

== Plot ==
Aleksey, an ambitious young man, is preparing to propose to his sweet and loving girlfriend, Alyona, who also happens to be the daughter of his boss. Seeking her father’s blessing, Aleksey learns that Alyona dreams of a proposal atop the Eiffel Tower in Paris, even though he’s afraid of heights. Determined, he purchases a ring and books tickets for the romantic gesture. However, just before the trip, his boss assigns him to work in Saint Petersburg, delaying his Paris plans. While in the city, Aleksey encounters a bold and captivating blonde who pressures him to donate to musicians. When he refuses, she recites poetry, sparking his interest. This mysterious woman, Irina, turns out to be a prominent Moscow journalist who secretly writes poetry despite despising her work in fashion. Their encounter leaves Aleksey unexpectedly fascinated, creating doubts about his commitment to Alyona.

Despite his wavering feelings, Aleksey flies to Paris, where Alyona has already arrived and eagerly awaits his proposal. By chance, Irina boards the same flight to cover Fashion Week. When they unexpectedly get detained for smoking on the plane, Aleksey and Irina share an unconventional bond, and Alyona even spots them together at the airport but is not suspicious, genuinely admiring Irina’s work. In a grand gesture, Aleksey proposes to Alyona at the Eiffel Tower, and she accepts, though his thoughts linger on Irina. Back in Moscow, Aleksey contacts Irina, who is now in Saint Petersburg, leading to a reunion that reveals the depth of their connection. The two realize they share an undeniable bond but feel constrained by Aleksey’s commitment to Alyona. Complications ensue when Alyona and her father arrive unexpectedly, and her father even takes a liking to Irina, further tangling the situation.

Ultimately, Irina decides to step away, unwilling to hurt Alyona, and resolves to leave her unsatisfying job to pursue poetry in Paris. Meanwhile, Aleksey, torn by his feelings, remains silent when Alyona, sensing his change of heart, questions his love. Understanding the situation, she releases him from their engagement. Aleksey then flies to Paris and reunites with Irina, finally free to be with her. Alyona, meanwhile, finds her own happiness by filling Irina’s former role at the magazine, embarking on a fulfilling career that aligns with her dreams.

== Cast ==
- Maksim Matveyev as Aleksey, a successful entrepreneur
- Lyubov Aksyonova as Alyona, Aleksey's fiancee
- Svetlana Khodchenkova as Irina, journalist
- Yekaterina Vasilyeva as Aleksey's grandmother
- Sergey Gazarov as Mikhail, Alyona's father
- Maksim Vitorgan as the editor-in-chief, Irina's boss
- Aleksandr Ratnikov as Marat, Aleksey's friend
- Yuri Kolokolnikov as Dima, Aleksey's friend

== Release and criticism ==
The premiere took place on 4 December 2014 in Russia. The film earned $2.3 million at the box office.
