= Klim Shipenko =

Russian director and cosmonaut (born 1983)

- Клим Шипенко
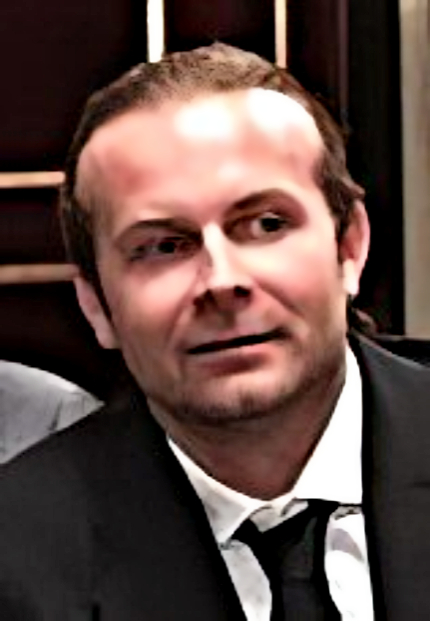
- Shipenko during a meeting of the President with the film crew in 2017
- Born: Klim Alekseevich Shipenko; 16 June 1983 (age 43); Moscow, Russian SFSR, Soviet Union
- Education: California State University
- Occupations: Film director; screenwriter; actor; producer
- Height: 1.90 m (6 ft 3 in)
- Awards: 16th Golden Eagle Awards (2018); 18th Golden Eagle Awards (2020)
- Space career

Spaceflight participant
- Time in space: 11 days, 16 hours, 13 minutes
- Missions: Soyuz MS-19 / Soyuz MS-18

Klim Alekseevich Shipenko (Russian: Клим Алексеевич Шипенко; born 16 June 1983) is a Russian film director, screenwriter, cinematographer, actor, producer, and cosmonaut.

== Early life ==
Shipenko was born in Moscow, Russian SFSR, Soviet Union. In 2002, he entered the California State University at Northridge (Film Production Department). He worked as an intern on the set of the film Something's Gotta Give by Nancy Meyers. He filmed the diploma film as a cameraman and studied at the Sal Dano Professional Actors Workshop.

In 2004, he returned to Moscow. For a short time, he worked on Channel One and was the director of the Plantain program about cars.

== Career ==
In 2006, Shipenko made his debut as a director with the short film White Night. In 2009, his first full-length work, Unforgiven, was released. The film was shown at the Kinotavr film festival. A year later, the director filmed the detective drama Who Am I?. His first movie about space, Salyut 7 (2017), is based on real events that took place in the 1980s on the Soviet space station of the same name.

In 2019, Shipenko directed the film Text based on the novel of the same name by Dmitry Glukhovsky. The film received wide attention due to an intimate scene featuring Ivan Yankovsky and Kristina Asmus. Glukhovsky said that, overall, he considered the adaptation to be very successful. Text received several awards, including winning in four categories at the Golden Eagle Awards.

=== Filming in outer space ===
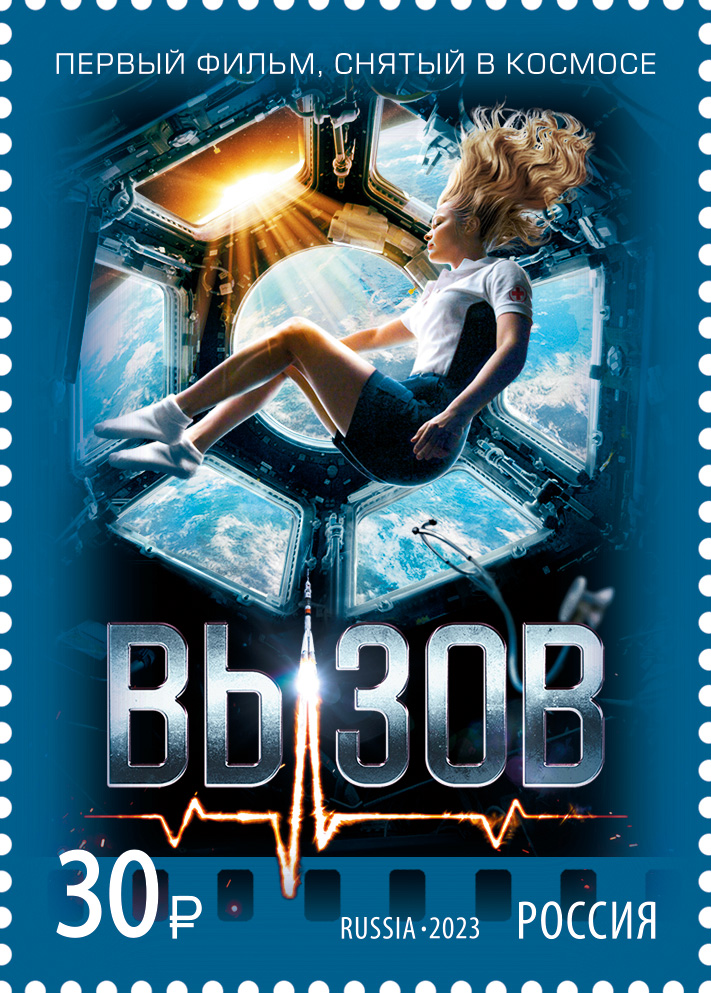
Russian stamp dedicated to the film The Challenge

In 2021, Shipenko shot portions of a science fiction film aboard the International Space Station. It is to be the second narrative feature-length fiction film shot (partially) in space (after Return from Orbit), and it is the first feature-length fiction film to be filmed in space by professional film-makers (Note: Claims about "first film in space" are dubius as other films have been filmed in space previously, like the feature-length narrative fiction film Return from Orbit (1984; some scenes filmed in space) and the narrative fiction short film Apogee of Fear (2012; completely filmed in space). In the film Return from Orbit the scenes filmed in space included important characters (not just "background"); the characters were portrayed by cosmonauts, not the "usual" professional actors portraying those characters, in the scenes that were filmed in actual space. As Return from Orbit was also filmed by movie professionals (except those scenes filmed in space, which were filmed by cosmonauts) and released into cinemas for wide audience, it has a good claim to the title "first movie in space"; the only relevant difference with The Challenge (2023) is that in the case of Return from Orbit, all professional film-makers stayed on the ground, whereas in the case of The Challenge, some professional film-makers flew to ISS to film some scenes for the movie. Also full feature length documentary films that have been released to movie theaters, like For All Mankind (1989) or A Beautiful Planet (2016; a film long enough to be a feature film according to many but not all definitions of feature film) have been filmed in space. The Challenge is however the first time a professional actor/ess has been filmed in space by a professional director, as other films before were filmed and acted in by astronauts/cosmonauts/space tourists (space tourists that were amateur both in film-making and as astronauts) or used footage from automated equipment. Apogee of Fear was written by a professional scriptwriter, and with some graphics assets done by a professional, but had no other filming professionals involved.). The project is tentatively called The Challenge (2023 film), and was shot between the launch of Soyuz MS-19 and return of Soyuz MS-18. The first narrative film filmed fully (the narrative film Return from Orbit had some scenes filmed in space) in outer space was a short film titled Apogee of Fear, shot in 2008. The Challenge was in a race with Tom Cruise and Doug Liman to shoot the first narrative feature film in space. On the ISS Shipenko was in charge of camera, lighting, sound recording and makeup. The acting was done by actress Yulia Peresild. The filming equipment was launched at Progress MS-17 and returned on Soyuz MS-18. Pyotr Dubrov and Mark Vande Hei helped with filming.

== Honors ==
- 2018 — The 16th Golden Eagle Award ceremony for the best feature film Salyut 7
- 2020 — The 18th Golden Eagle Award ceremony for the best feature film Text
- 2023 — State Prize of the Russian Federation in the field of literature and art in 2022 (June 9, 2023) for the creation of the feature film The Challenge

== Filmography ==
=== As director ===
- Night Express (2006)
- White Night (2006)
- Unforgivens (2009)
- 1000 Kilometers from My Life (2010)
- Who Am I? (2010)
- It's Simple (2012)
- Love Does Not Love (2014)
- The Nerd's Confession (2016)
- Salyut 7 (2017)
- Text (2019)
- Serf (2019)
- The Challenge (2023)
- Serf 2 (2023)
- Serf 3 (2026)
- December (TBA)

=== As screenwriter ===
- Night Express (2006)
- White Night (2006)
- Unforgivens (2009)
- 1000 Kilometers from My Life (2010)
- Who Am I? (2010)
- It's Simple (2012)
- Love Does Not Love (2014)
- Salyut 7 (2017)
- The Challenge (2023)
- Serf 3 (2026)
- December (TBA)

=== As actor ===
- Unforgiveness (2009)
- It's Simple (2012)
- Salyut 7 (2017)

=== As producer ===
- White Night (2006)
- Night Express (2006)
- It's Simple (2012)

=== As cinematographer ===
- The Challenge (2023)
