= Ivan Okhlobystin =

Russian actor and writer

- Иван Охлобыстин
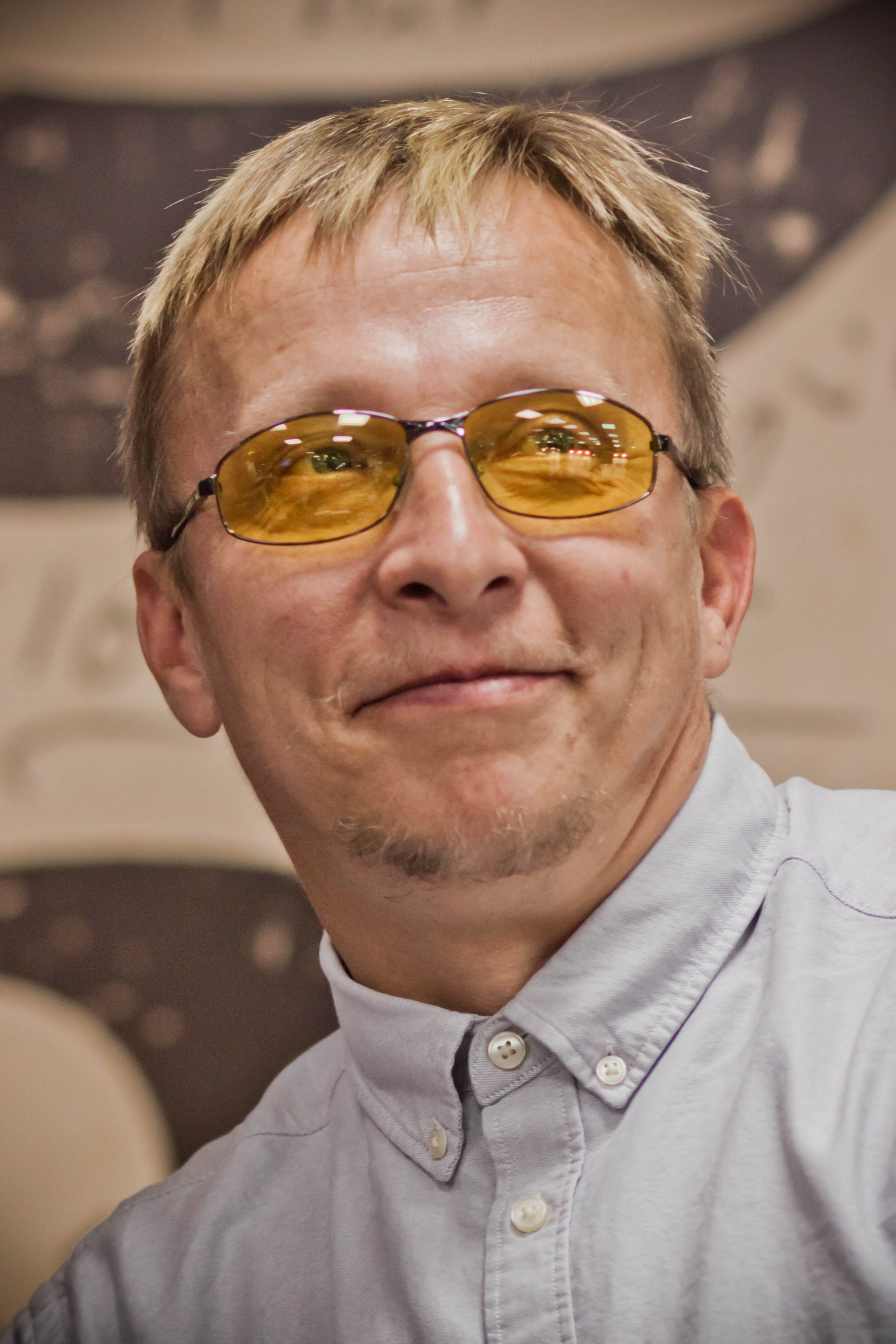
- Okhlobystin in 2017
- Born: Ivan Ivanovich Okhlobystin; 22 July 1966 (age 60); Polenovo, Tula Oblast, RSFSR, USSR
- Citizenship: Soviet Union (until 1991); Russia
- Occupations: Actor; director; screenwriter; playwright; journalist and writer; TV presenter
- Years active: 1983–present
- Spouse: Oksana Okhlobystina (m.1995)
- Children: 6
- Ivan Okhlobystin's voice Ohklobystin's interview on the Echo of Moscow program, 2 December 2012

Ivan Ivanovich Okhlobystin (Russian: Ива́н Ива́нович Охлобы́стин; born 22 July 1966) is a Russian actor, director, screenwriter, and former Orthodox priest. He was not defrocked by the Russian Orthodox Church, but was banned from priesthood for his roles in movies deemed "unworthy of the priestly dignity". He is the creative director of the company Baon.

== Early life ==
Okhlobystin was born on 22 July 1966 in the recreation center "Polenovo" (Zaoksky District, Tula Oblast, Russian SFSR, Soviet Union), where his father, Ivan Ivanovich Okhlobystin, was a military doctor, and a participant in World War II. He was then 62 years old, and worked as the head physician at Polenovo. His mother, Albina Ivanovna Stavitskaya, (Okhlobystina by her first marriage) (maiden name Belyaeva), was an engineer-economist. She was then a 19-year-old student. His mother remarried to Anatoly Stavitsky, and Ivan had a half-brother Stanislav Stavitsky. For some time the family lived in a village near Maloyaroslavets in the Kaluga Oblast, afterwards they all moved to Moscow.

After graduation, he entered the directing faculty at VGIK. Ivan studied on the same course with many future luminaries of Russian cinema: Tigran Keosayan, Bakhtiyar Khudoynazarov, Fyodor Bondarchuk, Aleksandr Bashirov, Rashid Nugmanov and others. On the parallel course (at the screenwriting faculty) Renata Litvinova, Roman Kachanov and others were studying at that time. Subsequently, Ivan continued the friendship and cooperation which began at the institute with many of them.

Without graduating, he was drafted into the army. After serving in the rocket forces in Rostov-on-Don, he reinstated himself at the institute. There he completely immersed himself in public work and was elected secretary of the Union of Cinematographers of the USSR. In 1992 he graduated from the directing department of VGIK (workshop of Igor Talankin).

== Career ==
=== 1990s – present day ===
Okhlobystin's career began with the picture "The Leg" by Nikita Tyagunov, which was released on the screens in 1991, he received the prize as the best actor at the festival "Molodost-1991" (because of superstitious reasons he was credited under the pseudonym of Ivan Chuzhoy). His feature directorial debut, Arbiter with a soundtrack by the bands Piknik and "Obermaneken", was awarded the Kinotavr award in the category "Films for the Elect".

At the same time, Okhlobystin took part in theatrical productions. On 16 February 1996, in the Moscow Art Theater premiered a theatre piece based on his play "The Villain, or Cry of the Dolphin" staged by Mikhail Efremov. In the same Moscow Art Theater, a second theatre piece of Okhlobystin was staged: "Maximilian the Stylite", in 1999 the director Roman Kachanov adapted the play about the newborn seer for film and released it under the title of "Maximilian". In the late 1990s, Ivan wrote for the magazine "Stolitsa" but soon left the publication, because as he said, it turned into a "brothel", then worked in the staff of the weekly "Vesti".

Work in the cinema continued in 2000 with the cult film Demobbed, the script for which Okhlobystin wrote in co-authorship with the film's director Kachanov; the plot of the film was partly based on Okhlobystin's own memories of service in the army.

=== Political and religious views ===
Okhlobystin became popular in the late 1990s but, following a religious conversion, withdrew to a monastery and became a Russian Orthodox priest. Patriarch Kirill removed Okhlobystin from the priesthood in February 2010, banning him wearing priestly vestments and the cross. In early 2010, Ivan resumed his entertainment career. Later that year he was named the creative director of Euroset, Russia's largest handset retailer.

On 5 September 2011 he announced that he would run for President of Russia in 2012 through the "Sky Coalition", but later gave up the idea, citing the opinion of the Russian Orthodox Church.

Appearing in RTVi's (Echo of Moscow's) Without Fools broadcast on 2 December 2012, Okhlobystin declared himself to be a "national-patriot" and claimed to "know" that "in the year when the head of State and the head of Church in Russia will both die", he will become the next President of the new Russian Empire. Saying "the Russian people will vote for me, and the Russian Church will anoint me," he stated that he would immediately put up a new Iron Wall around Russia and start a campaign of "cleansing" in order to "rebuild the Russian nation."

Okhlobystin is known for his homophobic views. In December 2013, he said that he wanted to "burn homosexuals alive," describing them as a "constant threat to his children," and that he could not watch this "Sodom and Gomorrah" any longer.

In July 2014, a "creative evening" with Okhlobystin in the Ukrainian city of Kharkiv was cancelled "due to anti-Ukrainian statements by Okhlobystin." In November 2014, Okhlobystin visited Donetsk and declared his support for Novorossiya. He said he was banned entry to Ukraine but considered Donetsk to be part of Novorossiya. He is also banned from entering Latvia and Estonia, and all films and TV series which feature him are banned in Ukraine. In June 2024, Okhlobystin was sanctioned by the European Union.

== Personal life ==
He has been married since 1995 to actress Oksana Okhlobystina (née Arbuzova) and has six children.

== Selected filmography ==
=== As actor ===
- Leg (1992) Guardsmith
- Arbitr (1992)
- Three Stories (1997)
- Mama Don't Cry (1998)
- 8 ½ $ (1999)
- Demobbed (2000)
- Down House (2001)
- Tsar (2009)
- Moscow, I Love You! (2010)
- Interns (2010–2016) series
- Office Romance. Our Time (2011)
- Generation P (2011) (Malyuta)
- Kiss through a Wall (2011) (wandering magician)
- Nightingale the Robber (2012) (Sevastyan Grigorievich "Nightingale" Solovyov)
- Bird (2017) (Oleg Ptitsyn)
- Wild League (2019) (Yasha)
- Serf (2019) (Lev)
- Non-Orphanage (2022) (Andrey Mast)
- Serf 2 (2024) (Lev)
- Prostokvashino (2026) (Pechkin the Postman)
- Serf 3 (2026) (Lev)

=== Voice roles ===
- Rango (2011) (Rattlesnake Jake, voice, Russian language dub)
- Ivan Tsarevich and the Gray Wolf (2011) (The King, voice)
- The Snow Queen (2012) (The troll Orm, voice)
- Ivan Tsarevich and the Gray Wolf 2 (2013) (The King, voice)
- The Snow Queen 2: The Snow King (2015) (The troll Orm, voice)
- Ivan Tsarevich and the Gray Wolf 3 (2016) (The King, voice)
- ABCs of SMO (2024) (Sergeant)

=== As director ===
- Moscow, I love you! (2010)

=== As screenwriter ===
- Demobbed (2000)
- Down House (2001)
- Paragraph 78 (2007)
- The House of the Sun (2010)
- Moscow, I Love You! (2010)
