= Serf (film) =

Serf Son of a Rich
- Theatrical release poster
- Directed by: Klim Shipenko
- Written by: Darya Gratsevich (ru); Anton Morozenko; Dmitry Permyakov
- Produced by: Eduard Iloyan (ru); Taimuraz Badziev; Vyacheslav Dusmukhametov (ru); Vitaly Shlyappo (ru); Denis Zhalinsky (ru); Alexey Trotsyuk (ru); Aleksandr Kushaev (ru); Vadim Vereshchagin; Rafael Minasbekyan; Ella Skovorodina; Zaurbek Bogov; Darya Gratsevich (ru); Anton Morozenko; Dmitry Permyakov
- Starring: Miloš Biković; Aleksandra Bortich; Aleksandr Samoylenko (ru); Ivan Okhlobystin; Mariya Mironova; Oleg Komarov; Olga Dibtseva; Kirill Nagiyev; Sergey Sotserdotsky; Sophia Zayka; Mikhail Babichev
- Cinematography: Yuri Nikogosov
- Edited by: Tim Pavelko
- Music by: Ivan Burlyaev (ru); Dmitry Noskov
- Production companies: Yellow, Black and White; MEM Cinema Production; Central Partnership Productions; NRJ Energy; Super TV Channel; Russia-1; KIT Film Studio; Ministry of Culture; Cinema Fund
- Distributed by: Central Partnership
- Release dates: 19 December 2019 (Moscow); 26 December 2019 (Russia)
- Running time: 109 minutes
- Country: Russia
- Language: Russian
- Budget: 160 million RUB ($2.6 million)
- Box office: 3.082 billion RUB ($62.2 million)

Serf (Russian: Холоп, romanized: Kholop), also known as Son of a Rich is a 2019 Russian comedy film directed by Klim Shipenko. The plot follows a wealthy businessman's son who is made to believe he has traveled back to the time of serfdom in Russia, in order to reform his uncouth behaviour. The film produced by Yellow, Black and White, the film stars Miloš Biković, with Aleksandra Bortich, Aleksandr Samoylenko, Ivan Okhlobystin, and Mariya Mironova. The film is the first installment in the Serf film series.

The film premiered at the KARO 11 October at Arbat Square in Moscow on 19 December 2019, and was theatrically released in Russia on 26 December 2019 by Central Partnership. Serf received generally positive reviews from journalists. It grossed 3.082 billion rubles at the box office.

The film's success led to a sequel, Serf 2, which was released on January 1, 2024, as well as several remakes.

== Plot ==
In Moscow, Grisha (Miloš Biković) is the son of wealthy businessman Pavel (Aleksandr Samoylenko). He is a spoiled youth who spends almost all his time in nightclubs, has casual sex with women, and does whatever he wants with no consequences. One day Grisha gets into an accident with the police, and his father realizes that Grisha will continue to be more and more reckless and dangerous in faith that his father will save him from any punishment for his actions. Pavel begins to look for a way to change his son for the better. TV producer Anastasia, Pavel's friend with benefits, invites him to contact Lev Arnoldovich, an eccentric psychologist whose unusual methods of rehabilitation may seem cruel and shocking, but almost always give a guaranteed result.

Grisha gets into an accident arranged by his father and loses consciousness. He comes to in a stable in an abandoned village, located on a landowner's estate in the Russian Empire in the summer of 1860, six months before the abolition of serfdom. At first, Grisha thinks that this is a trick, but the surrounding reality is too real, the surrounding people too convincing — and now he is a disenfranchised serf, a horse groom, unable to perform his duties because he is afraid of horses. Grisha tries to run away unsuccessfully and is dragged away to be hanged. He is saved only by the appearance of Aglaya, the daughter of landowner Dimitri, for the sake of whose name day her father pardons the fugitive. Trying to reason logically, Grisha at first vehemently denies the possibility of falling into the past, but then gradually comes to terms with his new life as a serf.

In reality, the whole village of the 19th century turns out to be a skillful movie-like production of Anastasia and Lev, carried out with Pavel's money. The goal of the project is to completely change Grisha's view of the world around him and himself, for which the team is watching his every move. The project is not a perfect recreation of 1860s Russia, but because Grisha is too ignorant of basic Russian history to notice the many anachronisms around him, the project is not threatened.

The scriptwriter plans for Grisha to begin an affair with Aglaya, developing into a serf eloping with a "lady" and a complete reassessment of his attitude, but Grisha does not seem to sympathize with the situation of a young woman forced to marry an older, rich landowner. Pavel, seeing no progress in Grisha's attitude, is enraged and plans to destroy the project. However, the project is saved unexpectedly: Grisha noticed village girl Liza wearing modern panties when dismounting from a horse and tries to lift up her dress to see her panties, a modern invention. Seeing the reaction of those around him, Grisha suddenly realizes that he's gone too far, and for the first time in his life returns to the person offended by him to ask for forgiveness. The amazed Pavel agrees to continue the project.

Grisha proceeds to make a genuine connection with Liza. The psychologist proposes to change the scenario and make Liza (who had only been working as a horse trainer for the project) the object of Grisha's love. Liza despises Grisha, but she nevertheless agrees to help him change. Along the way, Grisha gradually changes his views on life and himself, watching his own sins manifest themselves in the "son of the lord, Alexei", played by Liza's real-life boyfriend Anton.

Aglaya's actress, Polina, offended by the loss of her "leading role", convinces Anton that Liza plans to begin an affair with Grisha. They begin to have sex, but are accidentally spotted by Liza and Grisha, who didn't expect incest from "Aglaya" and her brother "Alexei". The furious Lev fires them for breaking character. In revenge, Polina reveals the project to the world and falsely claims Grisha is being tortured, sparking a police investigation.

Due to a pending police raid, Anastasia quickly plan to transit Grisha back to reality while Lev brainstorms to provide Grisha with emergency catharsis. As a result, they plan for an invasion by the Golden Horde. Grisha is not bothered by such inaccuracy, but when the time of the decisive action comes - not to allow the "Mongols" to kidnap Liza away for the amusement of the "Khan", he gives up and runs to his stable. However, after a few minutes, Grisha gathers his courage, saddles his horse and, having fought off Liza, rides with her out of the village. The arriving police are convinced that they are filming a historical wedding film. At the edge of the forest, Grisha and Liza unexpectedly stumble across a modern gas station. Grisha tries to understand what is happening, but he is sedated with a tranquilizer dart by the sniper on duty.

Upon waking up, he is told by Pavel that he fell into a coma for three months and there was no serf past and no village. While his character development remains, Grisha realizes this means that Liza was never real and becomes deeply depressed.

One day he meets Polina and Anton in a club, where, taking pity on him, they tell him the truth about the project and that Liza is in fact real. Grisha finds Liza at her riding school, and they start a relationship. Pavel and Anastasia get married at Lev's encouragement.

In the last scene of the film, another businessman's spoiled son is dragged into the fake village under the watchful eye of a disguised Grisha.

== Cast ==
- Miloš Biković as Gregory 'Grisha' / Serf
- Aleksandra Bortich as Elizabeth 'Liza', a veterinarian, and a countrywoman actress
- Aleksandr Samoylenko as Pavel, Grisha's father
- Ivan Okhlobystin as Lev, a psychologist, Anastasia's ex-husband
- Mariya Mironova as Anastasia, a television producer
- Oleg Komarov as an actor, a.k.a. "master Dmitry Timofeev", a gentleman
- Olga Dibtseva as Polina is an actress, a.k.a. "Aglaya Timofeeva", a young lady, and "master Dmitry Timofeev's daughter"
- Kirill Nagiyev as Anton is an actor, a.k.a. "Alexey", a young master
- Sergey Sotserdotsky as Artyom is an actor, a.k.a. "Proshka's stable boy"
- Sophia Zayka as Svetlana is an actress, a.k.a. "Lyuba"
- Mikhail Babichev as an actor, a.k.a. "Avdey Mikhalych", an executor with a whip

Supporting cast

- Sergey Abroskin as the author of the script
- Aleksandr Oblasov as Semyonov, inspector of the (traffic police) in Moscow
- Artur Vakha as a police major, Pavel's friend in Moscow
- Lusya Chebotina as a girl in a club
- Dmitry Permyakov as a sniper
- Azamat Musagaliev as an actor, a.k.a. "Azamat", Tatar Khan
- Igor Gasparyan as an actor, a.k.a. "little Tatar"
- Darya Gratsevich as the press secretary of the Ministry of Internal Affairs
- Andrey Malakhov as himself (cameo appearance)
- Anton Morozenko as a special forces commander
- Roma Acorn (credited as Roman Kerimov) as the next major / Serf

== Production ==
The film was produced by the film companies Yellow, Black and White and MEM Cinema Production, as well as the Super TV channel.

=== Filming ===
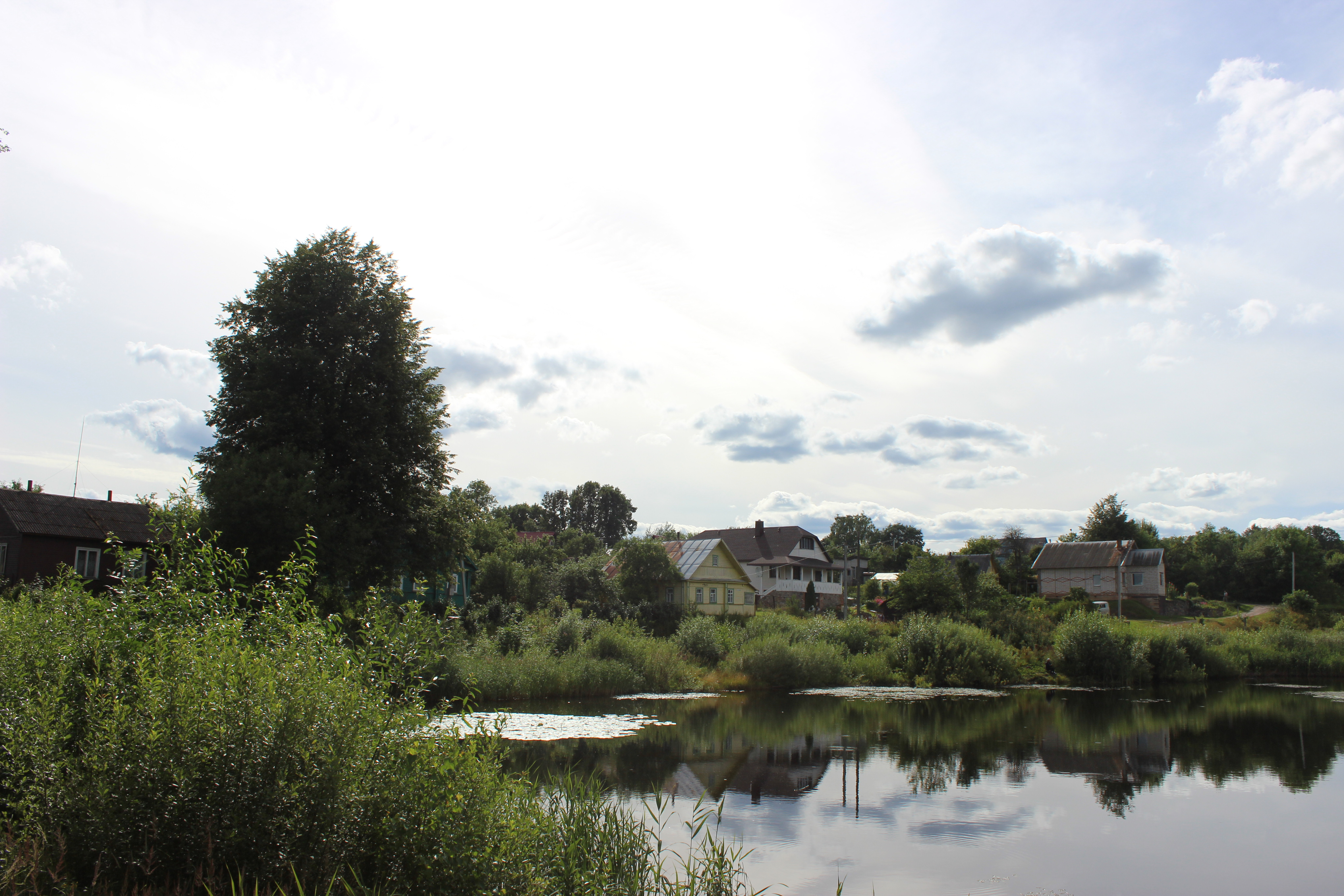
Pushkinskiye Gory translates as Pushkin’s Mountains.

Principal photography began in August 2018, in Moscow and the urban-type settlement of Pushkinskiye Gory, Pushkinogorsky District, Pskov Oblast, Russia.

== Release ==
Serf was released in the United States on 24 November 2019, and in the Russian Federation by Central Partnership on 26 December 2019.

The television premiere of the film took place on November 4, 2020, on the Russia-1 TV channel.

=== Marketing ===
The film was first shown at the 4th Russian Film Week in London. The premiere took place in the famous British cinema Odeon Luxe Leicester Square, in the main hall, which seats 800 spectators.

== Reception ==
=== Box office ===
The film was released in Russia on 26 December 2019, and in the first weekend of its screening put in more than 300 million rubles, and a total of 3.151 billion Russian rubles, which made it the most profitable film in Russian cinema. It was the most profitable Russian film of all time, with only Avatar grossing more (3.6 billion Russian rubles) in Russia's box office.

=== Critical response ===
According to critic A.V. Valley, Serf is a modern Russian hybrid of The Truman Show and the film Ivan Vasilyevich Changes His Profession. Reviewers of various online publications such as Meduza Anton Dolin, Tsargrad TV (Yegor Kholmogorov), Around TV (Anna Entyakova), Weburg.net. (Kirill Ilyukhin), and the magazine Ogoniok (Andrey Arkhangelsky), rated the film positively.

Film critic of the portal Film.ru Vladislav Shuravin rated 7 out of 10. The observer also notes similarity with other films, namely with the Text (2019 film). Shuravin notes that among the New Year's films of recent years, Serf is the most «middling option».

Denis Stupnikov, a movie reviewer at the InterMedia information portal, gave the film 7 out of 10 points. The critic notes the director's ability to «balance on the razor’s edge, but not cross the line», as well as the fact that «Klim Shipenko tries not to rely on empty buffoonery, so even simple-minded jokes have a very deep context».

Yulia Troitskaya, a columnist for the Kanobu.ru entertainment site, gave the film average ratings, indicating that similar stories had already been seen (Frontier (2018 film), Black Hunters (2008 film)). But, according to the critic, the plot is most similar to the mini-series Back to the USSR, only Serf «does not consist of four episodes, although the characters reveal the same pattern and come to the same finale». Also, Troitskaya did not appreciate the fact that the line of secondary heroes was not developed, therefore, «if they are deleted from history, nothing will change». In positive moments, Troitskaya recorded the soundtrack and the «good nature» of the picture.

Vera Alyonushkina, a critic of the movie section on the Russian version of Time Out, gave a negative assessment to the film. Noting some discrepancy between the age category and overkill with violent scenes, she rated the film two points out of five. According to Alyonushkina, the film could have been recorded in the category of forgettable comedies that were good for killing time, if not for one «but»: the reviewer was perturbed by the idea of violence as a correcting method for poor behavior like Grisha's. In particular, the final transformation of Grisha into gratitude towards his father and being the next person in the cycle of violence seemed too much like a reward for obedience: "do as I say although I abuse you and you'll be rewarded."

== Sequels and remakes ==
In August 2022, the filming of the film Serf 2 started. The entire main cast and creative team of the first film was involved in the production of the film. The film was released in January 2024.

Remakes of the film were planned to be released in seven countries. The Central Partnership company sold the rights to shoot adaptations of the film in full-length format to Sony Pictures (it will produce remakes in Mexico, India, South Korea, Japan and Spain), the Polish company Monolith Films and the French SND.

In 2023, the first remake was released - the film Son of a Rich: Mongolia (original title translated as The Rich Slave), directed by Munkhbat Dashzeveg.

A remake from France called King of My Castle was released in 2024.

Russian-Turkish remake Simarik, directed by Onur Ünlü and starring Kerem Bürsin and Melisa Döngel, premiered in 2024.

The fourth remake, from Kazakhstan, the film Malay, was released in 2025.
