= Kristina Asmus =

Russian theater and film actress

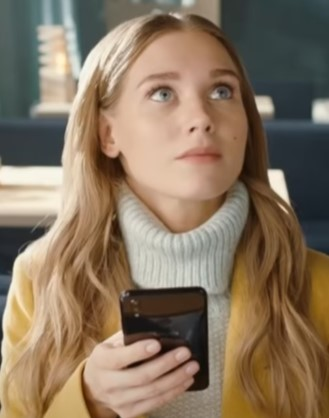
- Asmus in 2019
- Born: April 14, 1988 (age 38); Korolyov, Moscow Oblast, USSR
- Occupation: actress
- Years active: 2010–present
- Children: 1
- Website: https://t.me/kristinaasmusofficial

Kristina Igorevna Asmus (Russian: Кристи́на И́горевна А́смус; born 14 April 1988) is a Russian actress. She is known for her television role in the medical sitcom Interns. She was named the sexiest Russian woman of 2010 by Maxim magazine.

== Biography ==
Asmus came from an athletic background. She was active in gymnastics and rose to the level of Candidate for Master of Sports. Her younger sister, Karina Myasnikova, was a member of Russia's national gymnastics team.

She was still a schoolgirl when she played in the performance of E. Makhonin's "The Dawns Here Are Quiet ..." in theater "MEL", and after graduating from high school in the play N. Yermakova "Portrait of Mademoiselle Tarzhi" in Youth Theatre city of Korolyov.

In 2005, she entered the Moscow Art Theatre School in the course of Konstantin Raikin, but did not finish her studies. In 2008 she entered the Mikhail Shchepkin Higher Theatre School under the course of Boris Klyuyev. Her debut on screen was the role of Vari Chernous in the comedy series Interns. Model of the magazine MAXIM in 2010.

In 2011, Asmus became TV Actress of the Year according to Glamour magazine.

In 2013, she received Fashion People Awards as Fashion actress.

She appeared in the fifth season of ice show contest Ice Age.

In 2020 she started gaining weight for a movie called Rolls.

In September 2022, during the Russian Invasion of Ukraine, she was accused of criticizing the Russian warfare against the neighbor country, but was not convicted.

Currently she works in the Yermolova Theatre.

== Personal life ==
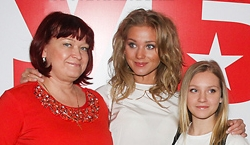
Kristina with her mother and her sister Karina

Since 2013, she was married to actor and comedian Garik Kharlamov. They have a daughter Anastasia (born 2014). They announced their divorce in 2020.

== Filmography ==
Year	Title	Role	Notes
2010-16	Interns	Varvara "Varya" Nikolayevna Chernous	TV series
2010	"Alibi" for two	Sasha Korobtsova	TV series
2010	Yolki	Lena	
2011	Ivan Tsarevich and the Gray Wolf	Squirrel (voice)	Cartoon
2012	Cinderella	Masha Krapivina "Cinderella"	
2012	The Dragon Syndrome	Aleksandra Maksimova	TV series (ru)
2012	The Double	Dasha	(ru)
2013	Sex Competition	Sveta	
2014	Easy on the Eyes	Elizaveta "Liza", florist	(ru)
2015	The Dawns Here Are Quiet	Galya Chetvertak	
2016	The Champions: Faster. Higher. Stronger	Svetlana Khorkina, gymnast	(ru)
2016	Psychos	Maya	
2019	Text	Nina Levkovskaya	
2020	The Whaler Boy	Girl from America	(ru)
2022	Desperate for Marriage	Lyubov "Lyuba" Yudina	
2022	Rolls	Tatiana "Tanya" Babanina	
2022	Aunt Martha	Olga Viktorovna	
2024	December	Yelizaveta Ustinova	
