= Yellow, Black and White =

Russian media production company

- Company type: Private limited company (2007—2010) closed joint stock company (2010—2015) (from 2015)
- Industry: TV media
- Founded: 9 April 2007
- Founder: Eduard Iloyan; Sangadzhi Tarbaev
- Key people: Eduard Iloyan
- Revenue: 2,3 billion rubles
- Net income: 3 billion rubles
- Parent: «Киоленна Холдингс ЛТД»
- Website: ybw-group.ru

Yellow, Black and White (YBW) Group is a Russian company, engaged in TV shows, series and movies production. The main company's partner from 2008 to 2017 (in 2021 partnership was restored) is "STS" TV channel. In the period from 2018 till 2020 YBW was cooperating with "Super" TV channel, but also it was creating the content for Channel One, Russia-1, NTV and others TV channels.

The most famous projects of the company are Gold Diggers, Daddy's Daughters, Kitchen, Eleon Hotel and The Ivanovs vs. The Ivanovs sitcoms, youth ones (show about different social groups of teenagers) 6 frames sketch-shows and Ural Dumplings (Russian: Уральские пельмени) comedy show. Among the most successful movies of the company there are The Kitchen in Paris, Kitchen. The Last Battle, Serf, Hotel Belgrade, The Last Warrior and The Last Warrior: Root of Evil.

Since 2017 the YBW studio is in the list of leading film companies whose projects are preferentially financed by the "Cinema Foundation". The total Box Office of YBW movies is more than 10 billion rubles.

== The history of the company ==
Former members of humoristic show KVN team of RUDN University Sangadji Tarbaev and Eduard Eloyan launched "YBW Show" on "KTK" Kazakh TV channel in 2007 made by Yellow, Black and White especially founded for that reason. In 2008 Russian "STS" TV channel took an interest in the format of the program (This is how the "Color of Nation" and "League of Nations" shows were created).

In 2009 Yellow, Black and White launched molodejj.tv website. Besides the TV Series, there are also exclusive materials, not shown on the TV, musical videos and much more presented. Since 2011 despite the fact that the most part of TV programs was "YBW" products, there was also "Red Square" company's TV show uploading at molodejj.tv ("Red Square" owned the half of one). The second half belonged to "YBW Group". In 2012 molodejj.tv was transferred under "Gazprom-Media" sales house sponsorship. In the end of November 2014 "Red Square" left "molodejj.tv".

In 2011 Vitaliy Shlyappo and Alexey Trotsyuk joined the producing company becoming general producers of the projects. Sangaji Tarbaev, the general producer, left the company in 2013.

In 2014, after the full-length movies success, "Films Forever" was created. The company was creating movies separately from the head-company.

In October 2017 Yellow, Black and White launched "Start" online-cinema platform. 26% of the "Start Media" LLC originally belonged to "Solaris Promo Production" Pte Ltd in Singapore (by that time it changed its owner). After a month this share passed to founded Cipriot TCT Production Ltd company. In December "Parnas-Media" LLC, 100% proppered by "Gazprom-Media Entertaining Television" LLC, became the only owner of TCT Production. By that, "Gazprom-Media Holding" was an indirect co-owner of "Star" online-cinema platform. At the end of 2020 the share of"Gazprom-Media" passed to "Films Forever" company, the rest 74% of the share is controlled by "Digital Media Holding" LLC, whose indirect owner is "MegaFon" cellular provider.

On January 1, 2018 "Super" TV channel was launched. It was part of "Gazprom-Media", which some of the former YBW employees had worked on (Check "Partnership"). YBW finished projects were supposed to be the main part of the channel's schedule (originally designed for "CTC Media" holding), but in November 2017 the holding had buybacked its own library and as a result there were foreign series and movies ("Baywatch" was the first), "TNT" series and sketch-shows reruns ("Sasha+Masha", "Babes and Chicks", "Women's League" etc.) broadcasting on the "Super" channel. The projects shown on "Super" channel were originally ordered from Yellow, Black and White by "STS" ("Fitness" series and "Funny time" sketchcom), but producing the new ones was performed directly by TCT Production. Since 2020, the general director of "Friday!" TV channel, Nikolay Kartozia, is reformatting the "Super" instead of the YBW team. On February 1, 2021, the channel changed its name to "Saturday!".

In 2020 YBW, "Soyuzmultfilm", "Russia-1" and "STS" announced filming a full-length movie about the "Cheburashka" (Russian folk character) with the minimal starting budget of 600 million rubles. The main character will be designed using computer graphics.

In September 2020 "Roscosmos" state corporation announced joint production with "Channel One" and Yellow, Black and White. For the first time history commercial companies are making a future film named "The Challenge" right on an International Space Station.

Since August 2021 YBW has restored its partnership with "STS" which began to broadcast "Grand" series, previously released at the "Start" videoservice and "Super" channel.

== Company Management ==
- Eduard Iloyan - General producer and board of directors chairman
- Denis Zhalensky, Vitaliy Shlyappo and Alexey Trotsyuk - General producers and board of directors members
- Mikhail Tkachenko - Production director
- Alexander Ilyin - Marketing director and General manager of the company
- Evgeniy Kazakov and Alexander Ostapyuk - Executive producers
- Vasiliy Kutsenko, Aslan Gugkaev, Alexey Tatarenko, Alexey Mihnovich, Julia Klimenko, Alexey Akimov, Konstantin Ivanov, Harry Gupalenko, Tatyana Goncharova, Ndzhe Airapetyan, Stanislav Gunko, Alexander Zavgorodniy - Creative producers

== General statistics ==
According to the "Spark-Interfax" data, Yellow, Black and White 2008 revenue consisted of 58,3 million rubles, net-loss - 17,2 million rubles. 2009 revenue consisted of 36 million rubles, net profit - 3,6 million rubles. By the end of 2012 revenue increased up to 1,8 billion rubles, in 2015 - up to 3 billion rubles.

Financial turnover of the company in 2013 was 2,3 billion rubles.
