= Cinema Fund Russia =

Russian media company

Russian Cinema Fund Analytics
- Type: State-run film distributor, production company
- Industry: Russian cinema
- Founded: 1994
- Headquarters: Moscow, Russia
- Key people: Leonid Vereshchagin, Nikita Mikhalkov, Timur Bekmambetov, Feodor Bondarchuk, Ruben Dishdishyan, Anton Malyshev
- Products: film
- Website: fond-kino.ru

Russian Cinema Fund Analytics, known as Cinema Fund (Фонд Кино; Officially Federal Fund for Economic and social support of the Russian Cinematography, Федеральный фонд социальной и экономической поддержки отечественной кинематографии), is the Russian Government's key funding body for the Russian screen production industry. Its functions are to support and promote the development of a highly creative, innovative and commercially sustainable industry, with a mandate to promote the creation and distribution of films in Russia as well as to preserve the country's film history.

It also had a production arm responsible for production and commissioning of films for the Russian Government. It was established by the Government of Russia in 1994 in order to promote the Cinema of Russia which celebrated 100th Birthday. The fund is considered one of the most important federal regulators in the film industry in the Russian Federation.

In December 2021, Prime Minister of Russia Mikhail Mishustin confirmed Fedor Sosnov, caretaker since December of 2020, as the executive director of the Cinema Foundation of Russia.

== Background ==
The Foundation is financially assisted film and television production and produced films generally intended for government purposes.

Across its various departments, The Fund supports the development, production, promotion and distribution of Russian screen content. In 2015, the cinema fund decided to distribute among Russian filmmakers $43 million (3 billion rubles). In light of the ruble's sharp devaluation over the last months of 2014, the dollar figure was almost one half of what it was a year ago, when the 2014 budget was announced. Given the fact that many production expenses, including cast and crew fees, are nominated in U.S. dollars, local filmmakers received considerably less cash in 2015.

== Pitch event ==
The foundation runs the Pitch Event every year to allow the Russian film studios ask for financing their projects.

== See also ==
- Roskino
- Mosfilm
- Lenfilm
