= Call My Manager =

Philippine comedy-drama television series

- Genre: Comedy drama
- Created by: Fanny Herrero
- Showrunner: Erik Matti
- Directed by: Erik Matti
- Starring: Edu Manzano; Judy Ann Santos; RK Bagatsing
- Opening theme: "Careful, Careful" by Dennis Garcia and Rene Garcia
- Country of origin: Philippines
- Original languages: English, Filipino
- No. of seasons: 1
- No. of episodes: 8

Production
- Executive producers: Ronald "Dondon" Monteverde; Erik Matti
- Running time: 63 minutes
- Production companies: HBO Entertainment; Reality MM Studios

Original release
- Network: HBO
- Release: 13 August – 1 October 2026

Related
- Behind Every Star; Call My Agent!; Call My Agent: Bollywood; Call My Agent - Italia; Menajerimi Ara; Ten Percent; The Talent Agency

Call My Manager is a Filipino comedy-drama series based on the France 2 series Call My Agent!. It premiered on HBO on August 13, 2026, but its first two episodes were screened in QCinema in November 2025.

The series depicts senior talent managers at the fictional agency SAM (Shine Artists Management) and their relationships with their managed talents, who are real, mainly Filipino celebrities playing themselves.

== Cast ==
=== Main ===
- Edu Manzano as Matthew Buenaventura
- Judy Ann Santos as Andrea Manuel
- RK Bagatsing as Gabriel "Gab" Soler
- Gina Alajar as Mother Aleta Alfonso
- Christiana Zaleta as Camille
- Raf Pineda as Chin Joaquin
- Kat Galang as Noemi
- Haley Dizon as Sophie

=== Supporting ===
- Nicco Manalo as Deo
- Loi Villarama as Daisy
- Madeleine Humphries as Rina Baltzar
- Ayen Munji-Laurel as Gina Buenaventura
- Anjo Pertierra as Hector Buenaventura
- Jose Javier Reyes as Paul Amir
- Edgar Mortiz as Samuel Mendiola, the founder of SAM
- Cristina Gonzales as Helena Mendiola
- Jomari Yllana as Congressman Frank Villacin
- Antoinette Taus as Cassie
- Chase Salazar as Lora
- Angelo Teves as Joey Borja
- Nour Hooshmand as Addy, mistakenly called by Andrea as Abi, latter's Road Manager
- Kathy Mulville as Kelly Norman
- Skyzx Labastilla and Ana Abad Santos as Mrs. Celis

=== The talents ===
The following appeared in more than one episode as themselves:

- Episode 1: Kiray Celis, Niño Muhlach, Janine Gutierrez
- Episode 2: Maricel Soriano, Snooky Serna, Brandon Vera, Jessica Vera, Kiray Celis (Alexa Miro appeared as new Kiray Celis)
- Episode 3: Laurice Guillen, Rob Gomez
- Episode 4: Zsa Zsa Padilla, Karylle
- Episode 5: Monsour del Rosario

=== Guests ===
Other personalities appeared in more than one episode.

- Celebrities: Rey Valera, Arci Muñoz, Dra. Alvee and Z Teo, Kimpoy Feliciano, Geca Morales, Lyle Sacris, Yuki Takahashi, Roderick Paulate, Pauline Lopez, Lao Rodriguez, Julius Babao and Tintin Bersola
- Directors and Producers: Roselle Monteverde, Malou Crisologo, Hermie Go, Vincent del Rosario, Mac Alejandre, Lav Diaz, Richard Somes
- Entertainment Press and Vloggers: Jojo Gabinete, Mario Dumaual, MJ Marfori, Marinel Navarro, Nathalie Tomada, Kate Adajar, Tessa Mauricio, Carmela Tunay
- Critiques and other press writers: Ogie Diaz, Mr. Fu, Rose Garcia, Ambet Nabus, Jun Nardo, Jim Libiran
- Other celebrity cameos: Dolly de Leon, Emman dela Cruz, JK Labajo, John Vic de Guzman, Ricci Rivero, Kent Gonzales, Precious Paula Nicole, One Click Straight, Harlene Budol, Elaijah Canlas, Christian Bables, Joel Torre, Robi Domingo, Lotlot de Leon

== Occurrences ==
- Originally, Angel Locsin was eyed on the role of Andrea.
- The series was shot from 2022 to 2023.
- Some episodes are directed by either Mario Cornejo or Jade Castro.
