= Behind Every Star =

2022 South Korean television series

- Promotional poster
- Also known as: Method Ent.
- Hangul: 연예인 매니저로 살아남기
- Hanja: 演藝人 매니저로 살아남記
- Lit.: Surviving as a Celebrity Manager
- RR: Yeonyein maenijeoro saranamgi
- MR: Yŏnyein maenijŏro saranamgi
- Genre: Romance; Comedy drama
- Based on: Call My Agent! by Fanny Herrero
- Developed by: Hong Ki-sung (tvN); Kim Young-Kyu (Studio Dragon)
- Written by: Park So-young; Lee Chan
- Directed by: Baek Seung-ryong
- Starring: Lee Seo-jin; Kwak Sun-young; Seo Hyun-woo; Joo Hyun-young
- Music by: Gaemi
- Country of origin: South Korea
- Original language: Korean
- No. of episodes: 12

Production
- Executive producers: Yoo Sang-won; Jang Shin-ae; Choi Chang-oh (CP)
- Producers: Park Ho-sik; Jang Jae-won
- Editor: Im Seon-kyung
- Camera setup: Single-camera
- Running time: 65 minutes
- Production companies: Studio Dragon; Baram Pictures

Original release
- Network: tvN
- Release: November 7 – December 13, 2022

Related
- Call My Agent!; Call My Agent: Bollywood; Menajerimi Ara; Ten Percent; Call My Manager

Behind Every Star (Korean: 연예인 매니저로 살아남기) is a 2022 South Korean television series directed by Baek Seung-ryong, and starring Lee Seo-jin, Kwak Sun-young, Seo Hyun-woo and Joo Hyun-young. Based on the French TV series Call My Agent!, it premiered on tvN on November 7, 2022, and aired every Monday and Tuesday at 22:30 (KST) for 12 episodes. It is available for streaming on Netflix in selected regions.

In December 2022, a second season was confirmed.

== Synopsis ==
It depicts the lives of celebrity managers of an entertainment management company called Method Entertainment, whose work is professional and life is an amateur.

== Cast ==
=== Main ===
- Lee Seo-jin as Matthew / Tae-oh

General director of Method Entertainment.

- Kwak Sun-young as Chun Jane / Jae-in

A manager with 14 years of experience. She started as a field manager and rose to the position of team leader.

- Seo Hyun-woo as Kim Jung-don

He is a team leader of Method Entertainment, a good manager having a good personality.

- Joo Hyun-young as So Hyun-joo

A new manager, who has admired the entertainment industry since childhood.

=== Supporting ===
==== People around Matthew ====
- Shin Hyun-seung as Go Eun-gyul

Tae Oh's son and a new actor from Method Entertainment.

- Jung Hye-young as Song Eun-ha

Matthew's wife, and the mother of Go Eun-gyul.

==== People around Chun Jae-in ====
- Noh Sang-hyun as Lee Sang-wook

The head of the investigation team of the Seoul Revenue Agency.

==== People around So Hyun-joo ====
- Kim Young-ah as So Jung-hee

So Hyun-joo's mother and the owner of a hair salon in Busan who has a strong and a sweet personality.

==== Method Entertainment ====
- Shim So-young as Shim Myeong-ae

Method Entertainment Honorary Director.

- Kim Gook-hee as Yoo Eun-soo

Method Entertainment general manager. She joined the accountant and moved to the management team but she began to develop a fear of driving.

- Kim Tae-oh as Choi Jin-hyuk

Method Entertainment Public Relations Manager.

- Hwang Se-on as Kang Hee-sun

Information desk employee who aspires to be an actor.

- Choi Yeon-gyu as Choi Won-jae

Field Manager and Agent 'Prince Prince' works as a powerful force of Method Entertainment.

- Lee Hwang-ui as Wang Se-ja

Method Enter president, who died from climbing.

==== Other ====
- Lee Ji Hye as Amy - Ceo of director Talundinor
- Kim Won-hae as Cho Ki-bong

CEO of Star Media.

- Moon Hee-kyung as Kang Kyung-ok

Wang Se-ja's wife.

=== Special appearances ===
- Cho Yeo-jeong as herself, an actress affiliated with Method Entertainment
- Kim Soo-mi as herself
- Lee Hee-joon as himself, an actor from Method Entertainment
- Claudia Kim as herself, an actress who returned after giving birth
- Seo Hyo-rim as herself
- Jin Seon-kyu as himself, an actor from Method Entertainment
- Lee Ji-hye as the agency representative, a representative of director Quentin Tarantino's agency.
- Young Tak as himself, a new star who has gained popularity
- Park Ho-san as himself
- Oh Na-ra as herself
- Kim Soo-ro as himself
- Kim Ho-young as himself
- Choi Su-rin as Joo Ha-min's mother
- Kim So-hyun as herself
- Son Jun-ho as himself
- Heo Sung-tae as Goo Hae-joon

A successful businessman who moved to the United States in his 20s and developed a dating app. He took over as the new representative of Method Entertainment.

- Kim Ji-hoon as himself
- Na Yeong-seok as himself
- Kim Joo-ryoung as herself
- Go Geon-han as Alex
- No Min-woo as Oh Hyun, a genius actor, and film director.
- Daniel Henney as himself
- Ryu Hyun-kyung as Ye Min-soo, Film director.
- Kim Ah-hyun as Ah-hyun, world class model
- Lee Soon-jae as himself
- Kim Ah-joong as herself

== Production ==
=== Development ===
In May 2021, Studio Dragon announced that they are remaking the French drama series Call My Agent! (Dix pour cent), as they have signed an official publishing right contract. Studio Dragon CP Yoo Sang-won said, "The character and story are really attractive, so I purchased the original, and now the script is going smoothly, and casting will start soon." He further stated, "A well-made drama with this will be released soon."

=== Casting ===
In October 2021, Lee Seo-Jin was offered the role of main character in the Korean version of Surviving as a Celebrity Manager. At the same time Kwak Sun-young was offered the role of female lead in the remake series.

=== Filming ===
The series, produced by Studio Dragon and Baram Pictures, is a hardcore workplace comedy drama, whose principal photography began on June 8, 2022.

On October 31, tvN announced that it had postponed the drama's press conference, which was originally scheduled for November 2. A new date will be announced at a later date due to the aftermath of the Seoul Halloween crowd crush.

== Original soundtrack ==
Behind Every Star

Soundtrack album by Various
- Released: 2022
- Genre: Soundtrack
- Languages: Korean; English
- Labels: NHN Bucks; Most Content

=== Part 1 ===
Released on November 8, 2022
No.	Title	Lyrics	Music	Artist	Length
1.	"Look Forward to Tomorrow" (내일을 기대해)	Midnight	Ant, Midnight	Billier Costi	3:53
2.	"Look Forward to Tomorrow" (inst.)				3:53

=== Part 2 ===
Released on November 15, 2022
No.	Title	Lyrics	Music	Artist	Length
1.	"Like a Childhood Dream" (어린 날의 꿈처럼)	Midnight	Ant, Midnight	XIA (Compliant)	3:46
2.	"Like a Childhood Dream" (inst.)				3:46

=== Part 3 ===
Released on November 22, 2022
No.	Title	Lyrics	Music	Artist	Length
1.	"Feel My Heart"	Junhwa Lee	Ant, Lee Jun-hwa	JUNNY	3:12
2.	"Feel My Heart" (inst.)				3:12

=== Part 4 ===
Released on November 28, 2022
No.	Title	Lyrics	Music	Artist	Length
1.	"Get Up"	Junhwa Lee	Ant, Lee Jun-hwa	Junhwa Lee	2:35
2.	"Get Up" (English version.)				2:35
3.	"Get Up" (inst.)				2:35

=== Part 5 ===
Released on November 29, 2022
No.	Title	Lyrics	Music	Artist	Length
1.	"On the Hill"	HOLLIN	Orori (MonoTree), Aejin Kwon (MonoTree)	Boramiyu	3:54
2.	"On the Hill" (inst.)				3:54

== Viewership ==
Behind Every Star : South Korea viewers per episode (thousands)

Season	Episode number												Average
Season	1	2	3	4	5	6	7	8	9	10	11	12	Average
1	773	744	634	571	699	571	522	722	627	633	498	742	645

Source: Audience measurement performed nationwide by Nielsen Korea.

Average TV viewership ratings
Ep.	Original broadcast date	Average audience share (Nielsen Korea)	
Ep.	Original broadcast date	Nationwide	Seoul
1	November 7, 2022	3.710% (1st)	4.406% (1st)
2	November 8, 2022	3.609% (2nd)	4.294% (2nd)
3	November 14, 2022	3.274% (2nd)	4.123% (2nd)
4	November 15, 2022	3.028% (2nd)	3.747% (1st)
5	November 21, 2022	3.096% (2nd)	3.778% (2nd)
6	November 22, 2022	2.921% (2nd)	3.476% (2nd)
7	November 28, 2022	2.549% (1st)	3.090% (1st)
8	November 29, 2022	3.540% (2nd)	3.740% (2nd)
9	December 5, 2022	2.924% (1st)	3.425% (1st)
10	December 6, 2022	2.996% (2nd)	3.719% (2nd)
11	December 12, 2022	2.416% (2nd)	3.134% (2nd)
12	December 13, 2022	3.608% (2nd)	4.144% (2nd)
Average		3.139%	3.756%
In the table above, the blue numbers represent the lowest ratings and the red numbers represent the highest ratings.; This series airs on a cable channel/pay TV which normally has a relatively smaller audience compared to free-to-air TV/public broadcasters (KBS, SBS, MBC and EBS).
