= Harry Trevaldwyn =

English actor, comedian and writer (born 1994)

- Born: Harry David Trevaldwyn; February 14, 1994 (age 32); Oxford, England
- Occupations: Actor, comedian, writer
- Years active: 2019–present

Harry David Trevaldwyn (born 14 February 1994) is an English actor, comedian and writer, best known for his roles in The Bubble and Ten Percent, the English remake of Call My Agent!.

== Career ==
=== 2019–2024: Career beginnings ===
Trevaldwyn began his career by posting comedic videos online, portraying an array of different characters. In March 2022, The Bubble was released to Netflix, in which Trevaldwyn stars as Gunther. In April 2022, Trevaldwyn starred as Ollie Rogers in Ten Percent, the English remake of the French Call My Agent!. The series premiered on Amazon Prime on 28 April 2022. That same month, Channel 4 announced that Trevaldwyn would write and star in Billi. The episode was released on 6 May 2022.

In February 2023, Trevaldwyn was a guest presenter at that year's Casting Director's Guild Casting Awards.

Trevaldwyn is due to feature in Sweet Sue, a film currently in post-production and starring Maggie O'Neill, Tony Pitts and Hannah Walters.

In May 2024, he starred as Stan in four episodes of the third series of BBC comedy The Outlaws. In 2024, Trevaldwyn played Jedi Mog Adana in The Acolyte.

=== 2025: Debut novel ===
In 2024, Trevaldwyn portrayed Tuffnut Thorston in the live-action remake of How to Train Your Dragon; the film was released in 2025. That same year, Trevaldwyn published his debut novel, aimed at young adults, titled The Romantic Tragedies of a Drama King. He later appeared as Charlie Butler in the film My Oxford Year.

== Personal life ==
Trevaldwyn is openly gay.

== Filmography ==
=== Film ===
Year	Title	Role	Notes
2019	The King	Dartmouth	
2022	The Bubble	Gunther	
2023	Sweet Sue	Anthony	
2024	Idiomatic	Johnny	Short film
2025	How to Train Your Dragon	Tuffnut Thorston	
2025	My Oxford Year	Charlie Butler	Netflix film
2025	Bury Your Gays	Matty	Short film
2026	Finding Emily	Himself	Credited as Influencer
2027	How to Train Your Dragon 2	Tuffnut Thorston	Filming
TBA	Or Something Like It	TBA	Post-production

=== Television ===
Year	Title	Role	Notes
2022	Ten Percent	Ollie Rogers	8 episodes
2022	Billi	Billi	Pilot episode; Channel 4
2022	Ellie and Natasia	Waiter	Series 1 episode 6
2022	I Hate You	Matthew	Series 1 episode 5: Jazz
2023	Smothered	Jordan	1 episode
2024	The Outlaws	Stan	Series 3; 4 episodes
2024	The Completely Made-Up Adventures of Dick Turpin	Steven	Series 1 episode 1
2024	The Acolyte	Mog Adana	2 episodes
2024	My Lady Jane	George	1 episode
2025	The Sisters Grimm	Mirror	Voice-only
