= Rebecca Humphries =

British actress and writer (born 1987)

- Born: 3 October 1986 (age 39)
- Education: LAMDA
- Occupations: Actress, writer
- Years active: 2011–present
- Television: Ten Percent; The Crown; Trigonometry

Rebecca Humphries (born 3 October 1986) is a British actress and writer.

== Career ==
Humphries attended London Academy of Music and Dramatic Art and has appeared on stage in productions of Temple at the Donmar Warehouse, Pomona at the National Theatre and Blackout Songs at the Hampstead Theatre. She is also the author of the memoir Why Did You Stay? published in 2022.

Humphries' comedy television roles have included Friday Night Dinner and Morgana Robinson's The Agency. She played Julie Fincham in the Amazon Prime Video series Ten Percent, a British remake of Call My Agent!, in April 2022.

In 2023, Humphries portrayed Carrie Johnson in the Channel 4 docu-drama Partygate. Previously, she had portrayed Carol Thatcher in the television drama series The Crown. Also in 2023, she started filming Ben Wheatley comedy-horror series Generation Z.

== Personal life ==
Humphries began a relationship with British comedian Seann Walsh in 2013, which lasted for five years. She has spoken in the House of Commons about gaslighting and the media on behalf of the organisers of the Women’s March London.

== Filmography ==
Year	Title	Role	Notes
2011	Come Fly with Me	Holly's mother	1 episode
2012	Cardinal Burns	Kate	1 episode
2013	The Intern	Rebecca	1 episode
2013	Aunties	Sharon	TV film
2013	Big Bad World	Beth	8 episodes
2015	Cockroaches	Jennifer	6 episodes
2015	Crackanory	Lisa	1 episode
2016	Morgana Robinson's The Agency	Rachel	6 episode
2018	Hold the Sunset	Police officer	
2020	Trigonometry	Caroline	8 episodes
2020	Friday Night Dinner	Lucy Two	1 episode
2020	The Crown	Carol Thatcher	2 episodes
2022	Ten Percent	Julie Fincham	8 episodes
2023	Partygate	Carrie Johnson	TV drama
2024–present	Piglets	Melanie	Main role
2024	Generation Z	Jane	1 episode
