= Sweet Sue =

Sweet Sue may refer to:

- Sweet Sue (comic strip), a British comic strip by Bill Ritchie
- Sweet Sue (play) – Play written by A. R. Gurney, a 1986 play by A. R. Gurney
- "Sweet Sue, Just You", a 1928 jazz song
- Sweet Sue (film) – British drama film
- Sweet Sue, a brand of canned meats owned by Bumble Bee Foods specializing in chicken
