= True True Lie =

2009 film directed by Eric Styles

- Directed by: Eric Styles
- Written by: Camille Solari; Gary Humphreys
- Produced by: Marshall Herskovitz; Richard Solomon; Edward Zwick
- Starring: Jaime King; Lydia Leonard; Jason Durr; Annabelle Wallis; Yasmin Paige; Camille Solari; Tiffany Hannam-Daniels; Diana Gherasim
- Cinematography: Ed Mash
- Edited by: Danny Tull
- Music by: Dashiell Rae
- Release date: August 4, 2009 (DVD)
- Country: United States
- Language: English

True True Lie is 2009 thriller film directed by Eric Styles. The film follows Dana, who, after 12 years in an asylum, is reunited with her family and longtime friends Nathalie and Paige. Dana slowly begins to realize that the events that led to her stay there may not have been imaginary. True True Lie stars Jaime King as Nathalie, Lydia Leonard as Dana and Annabelle Wallis as Paige.

== Cast ==
- Jaime King as Nathalie
- Lydia Leonard as Dana
- Jason Durr as Dr. Anthony
- Annabelle Wallis as Paige
- Yasmin Paige as Young Dana
- Camille Solari as Lucy
- Tiffany Hannam-Daniels as Young Nathalie
- Diana Gherasim as Young Paige
- Brock Everitt-Elwick as Nicky
- Adam Croasdell as Shaun Rednik
- Elvin Dandel as Martin Van Trier

== Reception ==
Qwipster said of the film, "If you find yourself attracted to sleazy late-night cable thrillers, True True Lie is probably better than most of those, although those with prurient interests will be disappointed that there are only brief flashes of nudity and only some very modest sexual teasing without actual consummation."
