= Call My Agent - Italia =

Italian comedy-drama television series

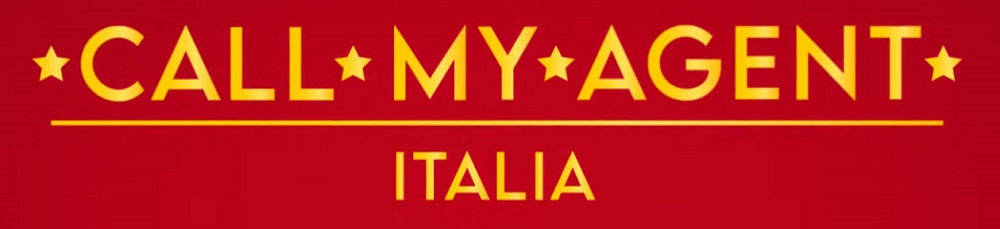
- Genre: Comedy
- Created by: Fanny Herrero
- Based on: Call My Agent!
- Starring: Michele Di Mauro; Sara Drago; Maurizio Lastrico; Marzia Ubaldi; Sara Lazzaro; Francesco Russo; Paola Buratto; Kaze
- Country of origin: Italy
- Original language: Italian
- No. of seasons: 3
- No. of episodes: 18

Production
- Production companies: Sky Studios; Palomar

Original release
- Network: Sky Atlantic
- Release: 20 January 2023 – present

Call My Agent - Italia is an Italian comedy television series that premiered on Sky Atlantic on 20 January 2023. The series depicts talent agents at the fictional agency CMA (Claudio Maiorana Agency) and their relationships with their clients, who are real Italian celebrities playing themselves. Produced by Sky Studios and Palomar, it is based on the French TV series Call My Agent!. The first season consists of six episodes, written by Lisa Nur Sultan and directed by Luca Ribuoli. The second season of six episodes premiered on 22 March 2024, and the third season of six episodes premiered on 14 November 2025.

== Overview ==
Talent agents Vittorio Baronciani, Lea Martelli, Gabriele Di Lillo and Elvira Bo, of the fictional agency CMA (Claudio Maiorana Agency) in Rome, manage the careers of their celebrity clients.

== Cast and characters ==
=== Main ===
- Michele Di Mauro as Vittorio Baronciani, a "cold and calculating" agent more concerned with himself than his clients or colleagues
- Sara Drago as Lea Martelli, a demanding career woman who burns through assistants
- Maurizio Lastrico as Gabriele Di Lillo, the "clumsiest and most kind-hearted" of the agents
- Marzia Ubaldi as Elvira Bo (seasons 1–2), an elderly agent from another era
- Sara Lazzaro as Monica Ferri, an assistant at CMA
- Francesco Russo as Pierpaolo Puglisi, another assistant at the agency
- Paola Buratto as Camilla Zanon, Lea's new assistant who is secretly Vittorio's illegitimate daughter
- Kaze as Sofia De Rosa, the agency's receptionist

=== Recurring ===
- Livia Rossi as Caterina De Paolis
- Rosanna Gentili as Guenda Neri
- Manuela Mandracchia as Lavinia Rondi
- Emanuela Fanelli as Luana Pericoli, an actress who is one of the agency's most outrageous clients
- Federico Fazioli as Claudio Maiorana
- Filippo De Carli as Davide Baronciani
- Pietro De Nova as Evaristo Loy (season 2)

=== Guest stars ===
Season 1

- Episode 1: Paola Cortellesi, Alberto Angela, Paolo Genovese
- Episode 2: Paolo Sorrentino, Ivana Spagna
- Episode 3: Pierfrancesco Favino, Anna Ferzetti
- Episode 4: Matilda De Angelis
- Episode 5: Stefano Accorsi
- Episode 6: Corrado Guzzanti

Season 2

- Episode 1: Valeria Golino, Valeria Bruni Tedeschi
- Episode 2: Gabriele Muccino
- Episode 3: Claudio Santamaria
- Episode 4: Serena Rossi, Davide Devenuto
- Episode 5: Elodie
- Episode 6: Sabrina Impacciatore

Season 3

- Episode 1: Luca Argentero
- Episode 2: Michelle Hunziker, Aurora Ramazzotti
- Episode 3: Stefania Sandrelli
- Episode 4: Marco Bocci, Vinicio Marchioni, Francesco Montanari, Edoardo Pesce, Alessandro Roja, Daniela Virgilio
- Episode 5: Miriam Leone
- Episode 6: Ficarra & Picone

== Episodes ==
Series	Episodes	Originally released	
Series	Episodes	First released	Last released
1	6	20 January 2023	3 February 2023
2	6	22 March 2024	9 April 2024
3	6	14 November 2025	28 November 2025

=== Season 1 (2023) ===
No. overall	No. in season	Title	Directed by	Written by	Original release date
1	1	"Paola"	Luca Ribuoli	Lisa Nur Sultan	20 January 2023
Actress Paola Cortellesi is giving an interview to Vanity Fair about her upcoming role as ancient Roman queen Tanaquil in a film opposite Brad Pitt, when her agent Gabriele learns that the production now wants a younger actress.
2	2	"Paolo"	Luca Ribuoli	Lisa Nur Sultan	20 January 2023
Director Paolo Sorrentino jokingly proposes a new series, The Lady Pope, starring Ivana Spagna in the title role and co-starring Denzel Washington and Madonna. Believing he is serious, the agents start putting the project together.
3	3	"Pierfrancesco e Anna"	Luca Ribuoli	Lisa Nur Sultan	27 January 2023
On the eve of the David di Donatello awards ceremony, Lea hunts down actor Pierfrancesco Favino to sign a contract to play Italian Prime Minister Mario Draghi.
4	4	"Matilda"	Luca Ribuoli	Lisa Nur Sultan, Federico Baccomo	27 January 2023
Actress Matilda De Angelis faces backlash from a social media post, and her agent, Vittorio, does damage control while fielding an offer of employment from Guenda Neri, a rival agency.
5	5	"Stefano"	Luca Ribuoli	Lisa Nur Sultan, Federico Baccomo	3 February 2023
Actor Stefano Accorsi refuses to turn down any roles, despite protests from his agent, Gabriele. Stefano is booked to play a police inspector during the day in Modena, and rock star Luciano Ligabue at night in Bologna, until both productions suddenly decide to film at the same time.
6	6	"Corrado"	Luca Ribuoli	Lisa Nur Sultan	3 February 2023
Luana Pericoli wants Corrado Guzzanti to star in her new TV series, but he is not interested.

=== Season 2 (2024) ===
No. overall	No. in season	Title	Directed by	Written by	Original release date
1	7	"Episode 1"	Luca Ribuoli	Lisa Nur Sultan	22 March 2024
A bad film screenplay creates a problem for actresses Valeria Golino and Valeria Bruni Tedeschi.
2	8	"Episode 2"	Luca Ribuoli	Lisa Nur Sultan, Federico Baccomo	22 March 2024
The agency lands director Gabriele Muccino.
3	9	"Episode 3"	Luca Ribuoli	Lisa Nur Sultan, Dario D'Amato	29 March 2024
Actor Claudio Santamaria will do anything to get a role he wants.
4	10	"Episode 4"	Luca Ribuoli	Lisa Nur Sultan	29 March 2024
A frenetic marathon of interview takes its toll on actress Serena Rossi and her actor husband Davide Devenuto.
5	11	"Episode 5"	Luca Ribuoli	Federico Baccomo, Lisa Nur Sultan	5 April 2024
Singer Elodie's voice proves to have magical powers.
6	12	"Episode 6"	Luca Ribuoli	Federico Baccomo, Dario D’Amato, Lisa Nur Sultan	5 April 2024
Lea worries about Sabrina Impacciatore's dream role.

=== Season 3 (2025) ===
No. overall	No. in season	Title	Directed by	Written by	Original release date
1	13	"Luca"	Simone Spada	Federico Baccomo	14 November 2025
Elvira had died, leaving her shares of CMA jointly to Vittorio, Lea and Gabriele. They compete for the CEO position by trying to land Luca Argentero as a client.
2	14	"Michelle e Aurora"	Simone Spada	Federico Baccomo, Camilla Buizza	14 November 2025
Michelle Hunziker and her daughter Aurora Ramazzotti are up for roles in a television series adaptation of Mamma Mia. As the new CEO, Vittorio considers a partnership with the new Italian branch of UBA, the biggest agency in Hollywood.
3	15	"Stefania"	Simone Spada	Federico Baccomo	21 November 2025
Stefania Sandrelli is eager to work with the young emerging director Antonia Ganor, unaware that the director has a grudge against her for a past slight.
4	16	"Romanzo criminale"	Simone Spada	Federico Baccomo, Tommaso Renzoni	21 November 2025
The original cast of the 2000s television series Romanza criminale are angered to be left out of a new reboot.
5	17	"Miriam"	Simone Spada	Federico Baccomo	28 November 2025
Lea is frustrated that Miriam Leone keeps rejecting maternal roles.
6	18	"Ficarra & Picone"	Simone Spada	Federico Baccomo	28 November 2025
Ficarra & Picone come in conflict over a role.

== Production ==
Call My Agent - Italia stars Michele Di Mauro, Sara Drago, Maurizio Lastrico, Marzia Ubaldi, Sara Lazzaro, Francesco Russo, Paola Buratto, the singer Kaze and Emanuela Fanelli. Ubaldi died on 21 October 2023, at the age of 85, after filming of season two had completed. The first episode of the second season was dedicated to her.

The series is produced by Sky Studios and Palomar, an Italian subsidiary of the French production company Mediawan, which originated the French version of the series.

=== Season 1 ===
Call My Agent - Italia debuted on Sky Atlantic on 20 January 2023. The first season consists of six episodes, written by Lisa Nur Sultan and directed by Luca Ribuoli. Guest stars include Paola Cortellesi, Paolo Sorrentino, Pierfrancesco Favino and his wife Anna Ferzetti, Matilda De Angelis, Stefano Accorsi and Corrado Guzzanti.

=== Season 2 ===
The second season premiered on 22 March 2024. The six episodes were written by Lisa Nur Sultan, Federico Baccomo and Dario D'Amato, and directed by Luca Ribuoli. Guest stars for season two include Valeria Golino, Valeria Bruni Tedeschi, Gabriele Muccino, Claudio Santamaria, Serena Rossi, Davide Devenuto, Elodie and Sabrina Impacciatore.

=== Season 3 ===
In March 2024, prior to the premiere of season two, Sky Italia EVP Nils Hartmann announced that a third season of the series was in pre-production. Season three premiered on 14 November 2025. The six episodes were written by Federico Baccomo, and directed by Simone Spada. Guest stars for season three include Luca Argentero, Michelle Hunziker, Aurora Ramazzotti, Stefania Sandrelli, Marco Bocci, Vinicio Marchioni, Francesco Montanari, Edoardo Pesce, Alessandro Roja, Daniela Virgilio, Miriam Leone and Ficarra & Picone.

== Reception ==
Mario Manco of Vanity Fair called the series "Enjoyable, funny, brilliant", and praised it as "the demonstration that the Italian way of taking ideas that come from abroad and making them their own is unique and inimitable, because few would have managed to transform Call My Agent! in a masterpiece of this magnitude".

=== Awards and nominations ===
Year	Award	Category	Nominee(s)	Result	Ref.
2023	Nastro d'Argento (Silver Ribbon) Award	Best TV Series - Comedy	Directed by Luca Ribuoli	Won	
2023	Nastro d'Argento (Silver Ribbon) Award	Best Supporting Actress	Emanuela Fanelli	Nominated	
2023	Nastro d'Argento (Silver Ribbon) Award	Special Nastro d'Argento - Cameo	Paolo Sorrentino	Won	
2023	Superciak d'oro (Golden Superciak) Award	Series of the Year		Won	
