= Partygate (film) =

British satirical political docudrama

- Genre: Comedy-drama; Docudrama
- Starring: Georgie Henley; Ophelia Lovibond; Jon Culshaw
- Original language: English

Production
- Production company: Halcyon Heart Films

Original release
- Network: Channel 4
- Release: 3 October 2023

Partygate is a British satirical political docudrama. It is a fictionalised dramatisation of the political scandal dubbed "Partygate" in British politics during the prime ministerial government of Boris Johnson. It mixes contemporary news footage with dramatisations of parties in Downing Street during the COVID-19 pandemic lockdown. It was broadcast on Channel 4 on 3 October 2023.

== Synopsis ==
Partygate is a political satire covering the story of 10 Downing Street gatherings during the COVID-19 pandemic lockdowns. It included fictionalised dramatisations of Downing Street parties interwoven with archive news footage and documentary interviews. Many of the dramatisations were based on Sue Gray's Partygate report and the Commons Privileges Committee investigation. Characters of special advisors were fictional, but based on real people.

== Cast ==
- Georgie Henley as Grace Greenwood
- Jon Culshaw as Boris Johnson
- Craig Parkinson as Lee Cain
- Ophelia Lovibond as Annabel D'acre
- Phil Daniels as Mickey Port
- Rebecca Humphries as Carrie Johnson
- Charlotte Ritchie as Helen MacNamara
- Tom Durant-Pritchard as Rory Baskerville
- Anthony Calf as Sir Mark Sedwill
- Alice Lowe as Shelley Williams-Walker
- Kimberley Nixon as Kate Joseph
- Alice Orr-Ewing as Alice Lyons
- Naomi Battrick as Cleo Watson
- Edwin Flay as Martin Reynolds
- Hugh Skinner as Josh Fitzmaurice
- Fanny Bacaya as Fanny
- Gisele Mbalaga as Giselle

== Production ==
Channel 4 announced the project as Partygate - The True Story on 18 April 2023. In September 2023, the title was shortened to Partygate. It was produced by Halcyons Heart Films.

It was announced in August 2023 that Craig Parkinson, Ophelia Lovibond, Charlotte Ritchie, Rebecca Humphries, Kimberley Nixon and Phil Daniels would all have roles, with Jon Culshaw voicing the prime minister.

Marketing for the show from 4Creative included rave-era style flyer distribution.

== Broadcast and reception ==
Channel 4 released an official trailer in September 2023. That month, a broadcast date of 3 October 2023 was announced.

The Financial Times gave the film three stars out of five, saying that it "boils the blood but it does little to captivate the mind." The Guardian gave the drama four stars, calling it "a giant, exploding grenade of a TV show" and heralding it as "a vital document of a moment of national shame."

=== Accolades ===
It won Best Single Drama at the Royal Television Society Programme Awards in March 2024. It was nominated for Best Single Drama or Mini-Series 1-3 EPS at the 2024 Broadcasting Press Guild Awards. It was nominated for the 2025 Broadcast Awards in the Best Single Drama and Best Original Programme categories.
