= Funny Cow =

- Directed by: Adrian Shergold
- Written by: Tony Pitts
- Produced by: Kevin Proctor; Mark Vennis; Peter Dunphy; Charlotte Arden
- Starring: Maxine Peake; Paddy Considine; Tony Pitts; Alun Armstrong; Stephen Graham; Lindsey Coulson; Kevin Eldon; Christine Bottomley; John Bishop; Vic Reeves
- Cinematography: Tony Slater Ling
- Edited by: Tania Reddin
- Music by: Richard Hawley
- Distributed by: eOne
- Release dates: 9 October 2017 (LFF); 20 April 2018 (United Kingdom)
- Running time: 103 minutes
- Country: United Kingdom
- Language: English

Funny Cow is a 2017 British comedy-drama film directed by Adrian Shergold and written by Tony Pitts. The film stars Maxine Peake, Paddy Considine, Tony Pitts, Stephen Graham, and Alun Armstrong. Original songs and score were composed by Richard Hawley, with additional songs by Ollie Trevers. Its plot follows a woman making a name for herself in the stand-up comedy scene of working men's clubs in northern England.

Funny Cow had its world premiere at the London Film Festival on 9 October 2017, and was released in the United Kingdom on 20 April 2018, by eOne.

== Plot ==
Funny Cow charts the rise to stardom of a female comedian through the 1970s and 1980s. It is set against the backdrop of working men's clubs and the stand-up comedy circuit of the north of England.

== Cast ==
- Maxine Peake as Funny Cow
- Stephen Graham as Mike / Funny Calf's Dad
- Paddy Considine as Angus
- Tony Pitts as Bob
- Alun Armstrong as Lenny
- Lindsey Coulson as Funny Cow Mum
- Kevin Eldon as Danny
- Christine Bottomley as Funny Calf Mum
- Hannah Walters as Jean
- John Bishop as Colin Pine
- Vic Reeves as Ventriloquist (Credited as Jim Moir)
- Corinne Bailey Rae as Coffee
- Richard Hawley as Cream / Rodney Chittingdon
- Kevin Rowland as Jeff
- Diane Morgan as Margaret
- Hebe Beardsall as Funny Cow (Aged 20's)
- Macy Shackleton as Funny Calf
- Dominic Brunt as Landlord
- Robert Curtis as Dial House Concert Secretary
- Bobby Knutt as Crookes Club Concert Secretary
- Graham Hughes as Jacques LeCock
- Duggie Brown as Old Man
- Tom Gibbons as Bob (Aged 20's)
- Jayne Bickerton as Mad Woman
- Alfie Graham as Liam
- Grace Graham as Debs

== Production ==
Funny Cow was shot entirely on location in January and February 2017 in Leeds, Bradford, Saltaire and Harrogate. The principal production company was POW Films. Post Production was at Lipsync Post in London and the film was co-produced by Gizmo Films Productions.

== Reception ==
Funny Cow received high praise on release with four star reviews from The Guardian, Empire, The Evening Standard, The Financial Times, The Independent, FilmSeekers, Screen Mayhem and with The Times and The Daily Star awarding a full five stars.

BFI magazine Sight and Sound listed Funny Cow as their Film Of The Week. Mark Kermode also made it his Film Of The Week for the April 2018 theatrical release and reviewed it again for the August 2018 DVD release Noting the division in critics' perception of the film and central character, Kermode emphasised that "its heart is absolutely in the right place but I think that is because it is not ashamed to depict the world it is actually representing".

The film garnered two BIFA nominations in 2018: Best Actress for Maxine Peake and Best Music for Richard Hawley.

On the review aggregator website Rotten Tomatoes, the film holds a rating of 79%, based on 42 reviews. The website's consensus reads, "Funny Cow rests almost entirely on Maxine Peake's performance -- which proves more than capable of shouldering the weight of this affecting period drama."
