= Fanny Sidney =

French actress, film director and screenwriter

- Born: Fanny Mauferon-Vernet; 5 April 1987 (age 39); Paris, France
- Education: Cours Florent
- Occupations: Actress; director; screenwriter
- Years active: 2005–present
- Notable work: Call My Agent!
- Children: 2
- Website: fannysidney.tumblr.com

Fanny Mauferon-Vernet (born 5 April 1987), known professionally as Fanny Sidney, is a French actress, director and screenwriter. She is known for her role as Camille Valentini in the TV series Call My Agent! (2015–2020).

== Early life ==
Born Fanny Mauferon-Vernet on 5 April 1987 in Paris, France, she changed her name to Fanny Sidney after spending three days in Sydney, Australia at the age of 16.

== Career ==
She attended the Conservatoire Municipal Hector Berlioz (2005-2006), then took part in the free class of Cours Florent (2006-2009), before joining the "Direction" section of La Fémis (2011-2015).

Between 2015 and 2020, she starred as Camille Valentini in the TV series Call My Agent!.

== Personal life ==
In 2019, Sidney announced that she was pregnant with her first child. In 2022, she said in an interview for Madame Figaro that she has two daughters. The identity of her children's father has not been revealed.

== Filmography ==
=== Cinema ===
- 2005 : Claudia disparue by Serge Roullet
- 2008 : La Neige au village by Martin Rit
- 2008 : L'Ennemi public n°1 : Sabrina Mesrine
- 2008 : Avoue que tu mens by Serge Roullet
- 2010 : Poème pour Louis, short film by Thomas Gendreau : Anna
- 2011 : Soulwash, short film by Douglas Attal : Flora
- 2012 : Populaire by Régis Roinsard : the fan of the regional championship
- 2012 : À l'ombre du palmier, short film by Bruno Veniard : Juliette
- 2013 : Pan, short film by Frédéric Bayer Azem
- 2014 : F.A.N., short film by Hugo Becker
- 2014 : Respire by Mélanie Laurent : Isa
- 2014 : Hippocrate by Thomas Lilti : Estelle
- 2014 : Tu veux ou tu veux pas by Tonie Marshall : Véronique
- 2015 : On verra bien si on se noie, short film by Hugo Becker : Valentine
- 2015 : Madame petite, short film by Fanny Sidney
- 2016 : Aucun regret, short film by Emmanuel Mouret : Célia
- 2019 : Allée des Jasmins, short film by Stéphane Ly-Cuong : Mademoiselle Sidzina
- 2019 : Selfie by Thomas Bidegain, Marc Fitoussi, Tristan Aurouet, Cyril Gelblat et Vianney Lebasque : Emma

=== Television ===
- 2005 : Diane, femme flic, episode Affaire sous X directed by Dominique Tabuteau : Anna Vignes
- 2005 : Confessions d'un menteur by Didier Grousset : Vanessa
- 2006 : Madame la Proviseure], episode Chacun sa chance and Le Secret de madame Jaubert directed by Philippe Bérenger : Clémentine Garcia
- 2006 : Passés troubles by Serge Meynard : Julie
- 2006 : Commissaire Moulin, episode La Dernière Affaire directed by Yves Rénier : Véronique Léonard
- 2007 : Sur le fil, episode Torts exclusifs directed by Frédéric Berthe : Anna Masset
- 2008 - 2015 : Hard series created by Cathy Verney : Violette Rousseau
- 2008 : RIS police scientifique, episode Chasse à l'homme directed by Alain Choquart : Mathilde
- 2008 : Guy Môquet, un amour fusillé by Philippe Bérenger : Jacky
- 2013 : Casting(s) (series, saison 2) created by Pierre Niney, Ali Marhyar and Igor Gotesman
- 2015 - 2020 : Call My Agent! : Camille Valentini
- 2017 : Calls, episode 1|16/11/2028 - Appels téléphoniques (Paris - New York) directed by Timothée Hochet : Laura

=== As director ===
- 2014 : Kick Off (short film)
- 2015 : Madame petite (short film)
- 2016 : Ugh (short film)
- 2017 : Loulou, episodes Séance photo and Le Club des femmes

=== As screenwriter ===
- 2015 : Madame petite (short film) of herself
- 2017 : Le Ticket (short film) by Ali Marhyar

== Theater ==
- 2007 : Si ce n'est toi by Edward Bond
- 2009 : On ne badine pas avec l'amour by Alfred de Musset
- 2009-2011 : Le Dindon de Georges Feydeau
