= Lydia Leonard =

British actress (born 1981)

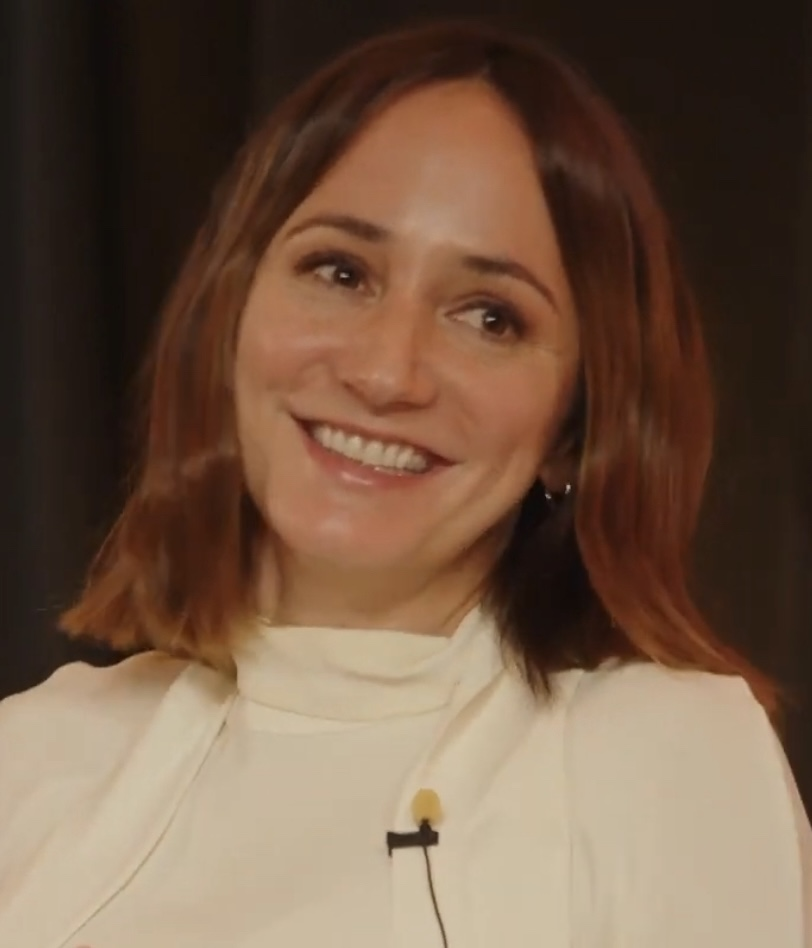
- Leonard at the British Library in 2023
- Born: 5 December 1981 (age 44); Paris, France
- Education: Bedales School
- Alma mater: Bristol Old Vic Theatre School
- Occupation: Actress
- Years active: 2004–present
- Known for: Bring Up the Bodies, Ten Percent, and The Crown

Lydia Leonard (born 5 December 1981) is a British actress. She starred in the stage adaptation of Hilary Mantel's Bring Up the Bodies, and as Jane Rochford in the 2024 TV adaptation of Mantel's third novel in the trilogy, Wolf Hall: The Mirror and the Light. She is also known for her television roles: the BBC Two sitcom Quacks (2017), the Amazon Prime series Ten Percent (2022), and The Crown (2022–2023) on Netflix.

== Early life and education ==
Lydia Leonard was born on 5 December 1981 in Paris, France.

She attended Bedales School in the village of Steep, Hampshire, before training at the Bristol Old Vic Theatre School in Bristol, England.

== Career ==
=== Stage ===
In 2005, Leonard appeared on stage as Polyxena in a Royal Shakespeare Company (RSC) production of Hecuba starring Vanessa Redgrave. The production played in London's West End and then at B.A.M. in New York. Also in 2005, she appeared as Caroline Cushing in the original Donmar Theatre and West End productions of Frost/Nixon.

In May 2009, she played Hazel Conway alongside Francesca Annis in the National Theatre's production of Time and the Conways.

In 2010, Leonard played the role of Jackie Onassis in Martin Sherman's play Onassis at the Novello Theatre in London.

Leonard played Anne Boleyn in the RSC production of Hilary Mantel's Wolf Hall and Bring Up the Bodies at London's Aldwych Theatre from May until October 2014. The RSC production transferred to Broadway as Wolf Hall: Parts One and Two at the Winter Garden Theatre, running from March until July 2015. Leonard reprised the role, which earned her a nomination for the 2015 Tony Award for Best Featured Actress in a Play.

In March 2023, she starred in Women, Beware the Devil at the Almeida Theatre, London. The production was rated 3/5 stars by The Guardian.

=== Screen ===
On television, Leonard had an ongoing role in 1950s-set detective series Jericho starring Robert Lindsay, and appeared in True True Lie (2006) and The Long Walk to Finchley (2008), along with a cameo in Rome (2006, "The Stolen Eagle"), and as a nurse in the BBC's Casualty 1909.

In 2008, she played the female lead in the BBC feature film remake of The 39 Steps. She starred as Cynthia in Joanna Hogg's 2010 feature film Archipelago.

In 2012, Leonard starred in two episodes of ITV drama series Whitechapel, as psychiatrist Morgan Lamb, for which she was nominated for Most Outstanding Actress at the Monte Carlo television awards. In 2013, she played a leading role in the action adventure film Legendary: Tomb of the Dragon. In the same year, she played Alex Lang in DreamWorks The Fifth Estate, starring Benedict Cumberbatch.

In 2015, Leonard played Virginia Woolf in Life in Squares, a BBC miniseries on the Bloomsbury Group.

Between 2019 and 2022, she appeared as Mariana Lawton in Gentleman Jack.

In 2022, Leonard starred as Rebecca Fox in Ten Percent, the English version of the French original TV series Call My Agent!. That same year, she began the role as Cherie Blair in the final two series of the Netflix drama The Crown.

In 2024, she was cast as Lady Rochford in the BBC television adaptation of Wolf Hall, replacing Jessica Raine, who had portrayed the character in the first season.

== Acting credits ==
=== Film ===
Year	Film	Role	Notes
2004	The Heat of the Story	(unknown)	Short film
2006	True True Lie	Dana	
2010	Archipelago	Cynthia	
2012	Playdate	Lydia	Short film
2013	Legendary	Katie	
2013	Birds Fly South	Layla	Short film
2013	The Fifth Estate	Alex Lang	
2014	True Love	Girlfriend	Short film
2014	Born of War	Olivia	
2016	The Prevailing Winds	The Hiker	Short film
2019	Last Christmas	Marta Andrich	
2021	All These Men That I've Done	(unnamed)	Short film
2023	Northern Comfort	Sarah	
2023	The Rabbi’s Son	Rachel	Short film
2026	Pretty Lethal	Thorna Davenport	

=== Television ===
Year	Film	Role	Notes
2004	Foyle's War	Marion Greenwood	Episode: "The French Drop"
2004	Midsomer Murders	Phoebe Frears	Episode: "Ghosts of Christmas Past"
2005	Rome	Julia	Episode: "The Stolen Eagle"
2005	Jericho	Angela	Miniseries; 4 episodes
2006	The Line of Beauty	Penny Kent	Miniseries; 3 episodes
2008	Ashes to Ashes	Sara Templeton	Episode: "The Missing Link"
2008	Casualty 1907	Laura Goodley	Miniseries; 4 episodes
2008	Margaret Thatcher: The Long Walk to Finchley	Joyce	Television film
2008	The 39 Steps	Victoria Sinclair	Television film
2009	Casualty 1909	Laura Goodley	Miniseries; 4 episodes
2011	Spooks	Martha Ford	Series 10; episode 2
2012	Law & Order UK	Lucy Kennard	Episode: "Fault Lines"
2012	Whitechapel	Morgan Lamb	Series 3; episodes 5 & 6
2013	Da Vinci's Demons	Reina Isabel I de Castilla	Episode: "The Tower"
2013	Ambassadors	Fergana	Miniseries; episode 3: "The Tazbek Spring"
2013	Lucan	Melissa	Miniseries; episode 2
2015	Life in Squares	Young Virginia Woolf	Miniseries; episodes 1 & 2
2015	River	Marianne King	Miniseries; episodes 5 & 6
2017	Apple Tree Yard	Bonnard	Miniseries; episodes 3 & 4
2017	Quacks	Caroline	6 episodes
2017, 2019	Absentia	Logan Brandt / Laurie Colson	Recurring role; 10 episodes
2019, 2022	Gentleman Jack	Mariana Lawton	Recurring role; 10 episodes
2020	Flesh and Blood	Natalie	Miniseries; 4 episodes
2021	Red Election	Beatrice Ogilvy	Main role; 10 episodes
2022	Ten Percent	Rebecca Fox	Main role; 8 episodes
2022–2023	The Crown	Cherie Blair	Guest role (season 5 and season 6)
2024	McDonald & Dodds	Lucy Holgate	Episode: "The Rule of Three"
2024	We Are Lady Parts	Clarice Melville	Series 2; 4 episodes
2024	Funny Woman	Lady Pandora	Series 2; 3 episodes
2024	Wolf Hall: The Mirror and the Light	Jane Rochford	Miniseries; 4 episodes
2024	A Very Royal Scandal	Esme Wren	Miniseries; 3 episodes
2025	Down Cemetery Road	Defence Secretary Talia Ross	5 episodes
2026	A Woman of Substance	Olivia Wainwright	Miniseries; 8 episodes
2026	The Party	Serena Fitzmaurice	5 episodes
TBA	The Portrait of a Lady †	Countess Gemini	Upcoming six-part series

=== Selected theatre credits ===
- The Meeting (Chichester Festival Theatre)
- Oslo (National Theatre/West End)
- Wolf Hall (Royal Shakespeare Company/Broadway, Tony Award for Best Featured Actress in a Play nomination)
- Onassis (West End)
- Time and the Conways (National Theatre)
- Elektra (Young Vic Theatre)
- Let There Be Love (Tricycle Theatre)
- Frost/Nixon (Donmar Warehouse/West End)
- Little Eyolf (Almeida Theatre)
- Hecuba (RSC)
- Women, Beware the Devil (Almeida Theatre)

=== Video games ===
Year	Film	Role (voice)	Notes
2011	Star Wars: The Old Republic	Additional voices	
2012	Bloodforge	Morrigan	
2013	Soul Sacrifice	Sympatha	
2013	Star Wars: The Old Republic: Rise of the Hutt Cartel	Katha Niar	
2013	Divinity: Dragon Commander	Princess Camilla / Prospera	
2014	Star Wars: The Old Republic: Shadow of Revan	Lana Beniko	
2015	Final Fantasy XIV: Heavensward	Lucia	1st expansion pack to Final Fantasy XIV: A Realm Reborn
2015	Everybody's Gone to the Rapture	Amanda Mason	
2015	Star Wars: The Old Republic: Knights of the Fallen Empire	Lana Beniko / Additional voices	
2015	Star Wars: Battlefront	(voice)	
2016	Homefront: The Revolution	(voice)	
2016	PlayStation VR Worlds	Female Civilian	
2016	Star Wars: The Old Republic: Knights of the Eternal Throne	Lana Beniko	
2017	Tom Clancy's Ghost Recon Wildlands	Midas Female / Nomad Female Replicated	
2017	Dragon Quest XI: Echoes of an Elusive Age	Queen Marina / Additional voices	English version
2017	Total War: Warhammer II	(voice)	
2018	Sea of Thieves	Madame Olivia	
2018	Ni no Kuni II: Revenant Kingdom	Nerea	English version
2019	GreedFall	Chief Derdre / Other characters	
2019	Star Wars: The Old Republic: Onslaught	Lana Beniko / Additional voices	
2021	Final Fantasy XIV: Endwalker	Lucia	4th expansion pack to Final Fantasy XIV: A Realm Reborn
2022	Star Wars: The Old Republic: Legacy of the Sith	Lana Beniko	

=== Selected audio credits ===
- The Colour of Murder, by Julian Symons, BBC Radio 4 2003, with Tom Smith, Lydia Leonard, Frances Jeater
- A Sting in the Tale – Myrtle, Mahonia and Rue, by Briony Glassco, BBC Radio 4, 1//1/2004
- Bunyan John – The Pilgrim's Progress, weekly from 4 January 2004, with Anton Rodgers, Neil Dudgeon, Alec McCowen, Anna Massey, Philip Voss, Lydia Leonard
- The Lair of the White Worm, by Stoker Bram, BBC World Service 4 December 2004, with Peter Marinker, Ben Crowe, Stephen Critchlow, Lydia Leonard, Richenda Carey
- The Seagull, by Anton Chekhov, BBC World Service 18 March 2006, with Ben Silverstone, Lydia Leonard, Nicholas Farrell
- Our Country's Good, by Thomas Keneally, adapted by Timberlake Wertenbaker, BBC World Service ~15 October 2005, with Nichloas Bolton, Lydia Leonard, Geoffrey Whitehead
- How to Lose Friends and Alienate People, by Toby Young; R4 afternoon play 3 November 2006; with Val Murray, Kerry Shale, Lydia Leonard, Elizabeth Bell, Kim Wall.
- Arms and the Man, by GB Shaw, BBC Radio 3 21 March 2010, with Rory Kinnear, Lydia Leonard, Hugh Ross, Frances Jeater

== Awards and nominations ==
Year	Award	Category	Nominated Work	Result
2015	Tony Award	Best Performance by a Featured Actress in a Play	Wolf Hall: Parts One and Two	Nominated
2015	Drama Desk Award	Outstanding Featured Actress in a Play	Wolf Hall: Parts One and Two	Nominated
2015	Outer Critics Circle Award	Outstanding Featured Actress in a Play	Wolf Hall: Parts One and Two	Nominated
