= Marina Rollman =

Swiss comedian

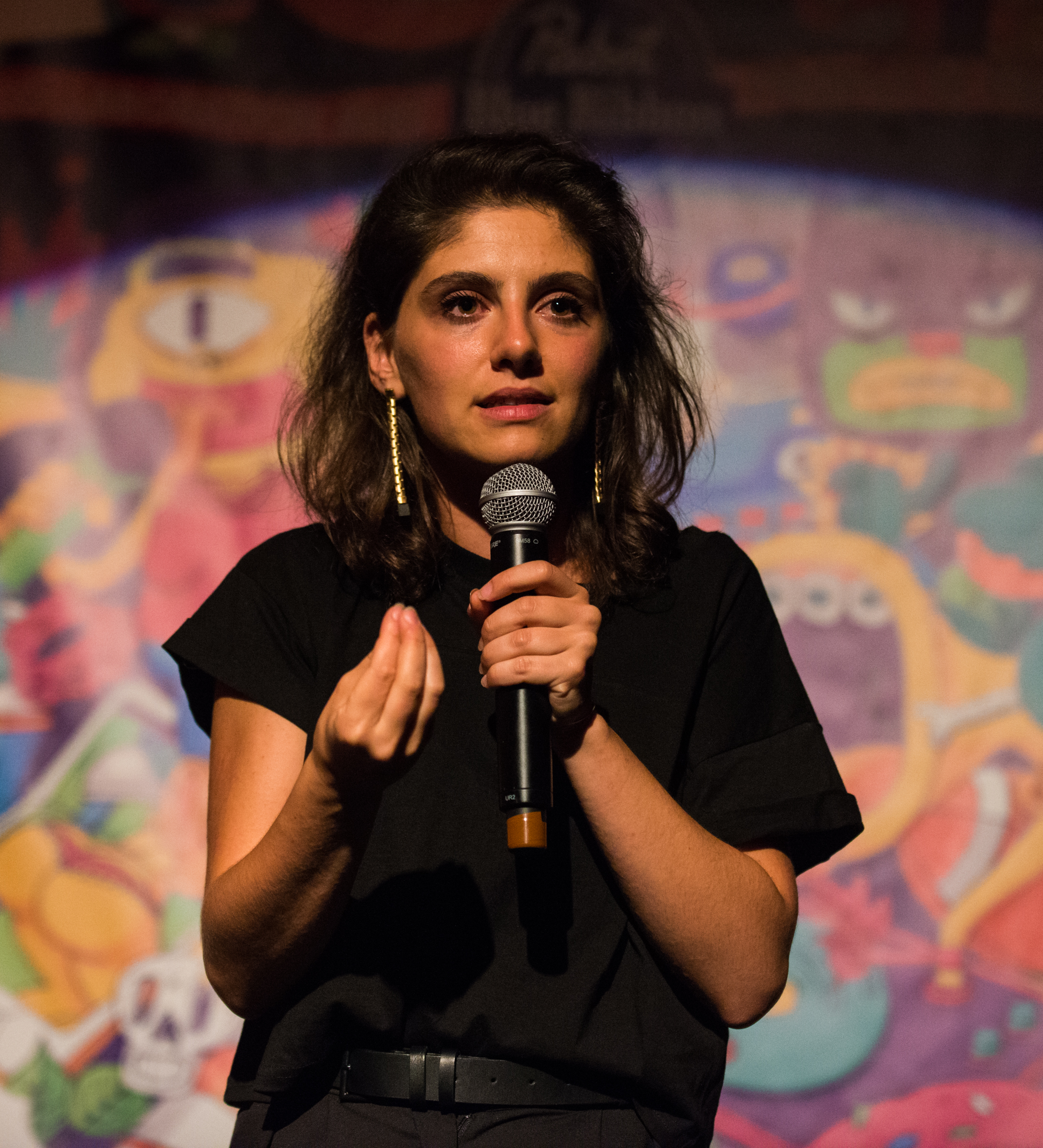
- Rollman on stage at the Zoofest festival in Montreal in July 2015
- Born: August 9, 1988 (age 38); Geneva, Switzerland

Comedy career
- Medium: Stand-up, radio
- Genres: Observational comedy, surreal humor, satire

Marina Rollman (born 9 August 1988 in Geneva) is a Swiss comedian.

== Biography ==
Rollman was born and raised in Geneva. She pursued her studies in Switzerland then Paris, in Architecture then in classic literature. She cites Jerry Seinfeld's show "I'm telling you for the last time" as a big inspiration to become a comedian. In 2009 she participated in a comedy contest in Paris, in front of professionals, but to no avail. Following her failed first attempt, she jumped between jobs, most notably in advertising in her father's company, working at a food truck, and as a babysitter for Natalie Portman’s child.

In 2013, she again tried her hand as a comedian, inspired by fellow Swiss comedian Thomas Wiesel. That year she performed in her first open stage in Switzerland, then started becoming a regular on radio and TV. In 2014 and 2015 she launched a web series and shows, and also participated in the "festival du rire de Montreux", the Jamel Comedy Club, opening acts for Gad Elmaleh.

Rollman emerged among a new generation of female comedians, choosing dark humour and soft irony, marking her place. She's known for her voice which oscillates between being "playful" and sounding "like a fishmonger's" according to critics.

Since 2016, she has participated regularly on the "Les Beaux Parleurs" show on the Swiss radio station, RTS La Première. From September 2017, she took on a regular bi-weekly chronicle with the "La Bande Originale" show on the French radio show, France Inter, presented by Nagui.

Since 2019 she has been performing at the Théâtre de l'Œuvre in Paris with her stand-up show "Spectacle drôle", which is widely praised by French and Swiss critics.

== Filmography ==
=== Television ===
- 2015 : Presque Normal : Marina
- 2017 : Funcorp : Chloé Quinta
- 2018 : Roi de la vanne : Pauline
- 2019 : Double vie : Ruth
- 2020 : Dix pour cent : herself
