= Tony Pitts =

English actor (born 1962)

- Born: 10 October 1962 (age 63); Sheffield, England
- Occupations: Actor, screenwriter
- Years active: 1981–present
- Partner: Katherine Kelly

Anthony Pitts (born 10 October 1962) is an English actor, most notable for playing Archie Brooks in the long-running British soap Emmerdale Farm between 1983 and 1993.

== Early life ==
Pitts was born in Sheffield, England. His family was working-class, his parents worked as a joiner and a midwife. Pitts originally intended to become a physician but ended up working as a car mechanic in his early career. He wrote a letter to the college to get out of college classes to become an actor. His family were livid at this. During his time at Stannington College, Sheffield Barry Hines paid a visit looking for extras for his upcoming drama Looks and Smiles. Pitts was cast and soon upgraded to a bigger role in the production. He decided to follow his ambition to become an actor in 1983.

== Emmerdale ==
In 1983, Pitts was selected for the role of Archie Brooks in the British soap opera Emmerdale. Pitts was chosen for the role by Kevin Laffan, who watched Pitts portray the title character in a theatrical adaptation of Nicholas Nickleby, and believed that Pitts' versatile acting ability and his strong Yorkshire accent, meant that he was well suited for the role. The role was Pitts' first role in a television series, and he first appeared on the show on 18 November 1983, and remained in the show for ten years, and his character was involved in storylines that included his prison sentence in 1989 for setting fire to Seth Armstrong's property, becoming a suspect of whether or not he was the father of Elsa Feldmann's child in 1990, and his relationship with lesbian Zoe Tate in 1993.

In 1993, Pitts' character Archie was killed in the Emmerdale plane crash. Pitts' last appearance on the show was on 30 December 1993.

== Other work ==
Apart from Emmerdale, Pitts had guest appearances in shows including Casualty as Aidan Phillips in 1996, EastEnders as Cliff in 1996, The Bill as Chris Riley in 1999, The Royal as Alec Glazer in 2004 and Unforgiven in 2009 as Adam Boothroyd. Tony was the original choice for Terry Duckworth in Coronation Street, but Nigel Pivaro ended up playing the role instead. Pitts starred in Lilyhammer as Danny Croc Hammer, the brother of Duncan Hammer.

Pitts has appeared in the police drama Heartbeat on two occasions, the first time in 1998 as Carl Southall and the second time in 2005 as Brian Gilbert. In 2002, he appeared as DI Healey in the miniseries In Deep alongside Nick Berry and Stephen Tompkinson.

He has also worked as a screenwriter, as well as an actor.

Pitts appeared in Scott & Bailey on ITV1/ITV1HD as Adrian Scott (the husband of Lesley Sharp's character, DC Janet Scott). He also had a small role in the 2012 film War Horse. In 2012 he appeared in the third episode of Dirk Gently as Robbie Glover. In 2012 he also appeared as the Chief Superintendent in the Sherlock episode "The Reichenbach Falls". In 2013 he appeared as Sergeant Moss in the BBC drama series Peaky Blinders. Pitts played Captain Patero in Rogue One: A Star Wars Story in 2016. He also appeared as Detective Chief Superintendent Lester Hargreaves in the 2014 second series of BBC's Line of Duty. His character returned for the season finale of series four in 2017. He also appeared in season five in 2019. From 2017 he appeared in two seasons of the series Jamestown as Edgar Massinger. Pitts also appeared in Wild Bill on ITV in 2019. Since 2020, Pitts has played the recurring role of Richard Alderson in All Creatures Great and Small.

== Filmography ==
=== Film ===
| Year | Title | Role | Notes |
|---|---|---|---|
| 1981 | Looks and Smiles | Alan Wright | |
| 2003 | Johnny Vegas: Who's Ready For Ice Cream | | Paramount |
| 2011 | Powder | Roger | |
| 2011 | War Horse | Sgt. Martin | |
| 2012 | When the Lights Went Out | Hilary Barnes | |
| 2014 | Hyena | Keith | |
| 2016 | Triple 9 | Major Crimes Detective | |
| 2016 | Away | Col | |
| 2016 | Rogue One | Captain Pterro | |
| 2017 | Funny Cow | Bob | |
| 2017 | Journeyman | Richie | |
| 2023 | Sweet Sue | Ron | |

=== Television ===
| Year | Title | Role | Notes |
|---|---|---|---|
| 1983–1993 | Emmerdale | Archie Brooks | Series regular |
| 1996 | Casualty | Aidan Phillips | |
| 1996 | EastEnders | Cliff | |
| 1998 | Heartbeat | Carl Southall | |
| 1999 | The Bill | Chris Riley | |
| 2001 | Red Riding | John Nolan | |
| 2002 | In Deep | DI Healey | |
| 2004 | The Royal | Alec Glazer | |
| 2005 | Heartbeat | Brian Gilbert | |
| 2009 | Unforgiven | Adam Boothroyd | |
| 2011–2013 | Scott & Bailey | Adrian Scott | Series 1-3 |
| 2012 | Dirk Gently | Robbie Glover | Episode 3 |
| 2012 | Sherlock | Chief Superintendent | Episode: "The Reichenbach Falls" |
| 2013-2017 | Peaky Blinders | Sergeant Moss | |
| 2014–2015 | My Mad Fat Diary | Chloe's Dad | Series 2, 3 |
| 2014–2019 | Line of Duty | DCS Lester Hargreaves | Series 2, 4, 5 |
| 2017–2018 | Jamestown | Edgar Massinger | |
| 2019 | Wild Bill | Keith Metcalfe | |
| 2020 | Roadkill | Mick 'the Mouth' Murray | |
| 2020- | All Creatures Great and Small | Richard Alderson | Recurring role |
| 2021 | The North Water | Geoffrey Turner | |
| 2025 | In Flight | Anton Marquis | |

=== Writing/Directing Credits ===
| Year | Title | Company and Format | Role | Cast | Nominations/Wins |
|---|---|---|---|---|---|
| 2002 | Night Class | Radio 4 Comedy Series 6x30 mins episodes | Creator & Co-writer | Johnny Vegas, Rebecca Front, Nicola Stephenson, Tony Pitts, Tony Burgess, Lyndsey Marshal, Gwyneth Powell, Christian Knowles | |
| 2003 | Johnny Vegas: Who’s Ready For Ice Cream? | Paramount Video | Writer | Johnny Vegas, Tony Pitts, Tony Burgess, Adrian Manfred Director - Stewart Lee | |
| 2005 | 18 Stone of Idiot | Channel 4 6hrs Entertainment | Writer & Performer | Guest Include: Elvis Costello, Ray Winstone, Kathy Burke, Rhys Ifans, David Soul, Huey Morgan | NOMINATED- Golden Rose of Montreal |
| 2009 | The Gemma Factor | BBC 6x30min episode sitcom | Writer/Actor | Gwyneth Powell, Angus Barnett, Philip McGinley, Ross Adams, Claire King, Tony Pitts | |
| 2012 | Shedtown - Series 1 | Radio 4 Comedy Series 6x35 mins | Writer/Director | Tony Pitts, Kevin Eldon, Johnny Vegas, Suranne Jones, Shaun Dooley, Ronni Ancona, Emma Fryer, Adrian Manfredi, Caron May Carly, Jessica Knappett, James Quinn, Warren Brown | |
| 2012 | On It | Radio 4 Afternoon play | Writer/Director | Tony Pitts, Adam Gillen, Maxine Peake, Joanne Mitchell, Gwyneth Powell | WON - BBC Best Audio Drama (Single Play) 2013 WON - Sony Gold at the Sony Awards 2012 (Best Radio Drama) |
| 2013 | Shedtown - Series 2 | Radio 4 Comedy Series 6x35 mins | Writer/Director | Tony Pitts, Stephen Mangan, Ronni Ancona, Johnny Vegas, Emma Fryer, Adrian Manfredi, Rosina Carbone, Shaun Dooley, James Quinn, Warren Brown, Eleanor Samson, Maxine Peake | |
| 2013 | Shedtown - Series 3 | Radio 4 Comedy Series 6x35 mins | Writer/Director | Stephen Mangan, Tony Pitts, Warren Brown, James Quinn, Shaun Keaveny, Rosina Carbone, Debra Stephenson, Seymour Mace, Emma Fryer, Neil Maskell, Juliet Oldfield, Maxine Peake | |
| 2014 | Pact | Radio 4 Afternoon Play | Writer/Director | Richard Hawley, Tony Pitts, Maxine Peake, Gwyneth Powell, Dominic Brunt, Polly Maberly | WON - Bronze BBC Audio Drama Awards 2014 |
| 2015 | Monster | Radio 4 Afternoon Play | Writer/Director | Neil Maskell, Sean Dooley, Richard Hawley | Nominated - BBC Audio Awards 2016, Best Audio Drama, Single Play |
| 2018 | Funny Cow | Feature Film | Writer/Producer/Actor | Maxine Peake, Stephen Graham, Paddy Considine, Tony Pitts | Nominated - BIFA Best Actress and Best Music 2018 |
| 2019 | A Badge | Radio 4 Afternoon Play | Writer/Director | Katherine Kelly (actress), Corinne Bailey Rae, Warren Brown, Kate Hardie, Isaac Whitmore, Tony Pitts, Caleb Potter Williams | Nominated - BBC Audio Awards 2020, Best Actress (Katherine Kelly) |
| 2022 | Curl Up And D.I | Podcast 6 episodes Scripted Comedy | Writer/Director | Vic Reeves, Morgana Robinson, Mark Benton, Katherine Kelly (actress), Burn Gorman, Nancy Sorrell, Jennifer Saayeng | |
| 2022 | Let Her Go | Short Film | Writer/Director | Katherine Kelly (actress), Lisa Allen, Gracie Kelly | |
| 2021-Current | Three Little Words | Podcast, Biographical | Creator & Co-Presenter | With John Bishop and many special guests including Ian McKellen, Robbie Williams | |
| 2024 | Classic (In development) | Feature Film | Creator Writer/Director/Producer | Sally Philips, David Morrissey, Leigh Francis, Robbie Williams, Mark Benton, Morgana Robinson, Burn Gorman | |
