= Sweet Sue (film) =

British drama film

- Theatrical release poster
- Directed by: Leo Leigh
- Screenplay by: Leo Leigh
- Produced by: Scott O’Donnell; Andy Brunskill; Tim Nash
- Starring: Maggie O'Neill; Tony Pitts; Harry Trevaldwyn
- Production companies: Somesuch; SUMS Film & Media; BBC Film
- Distributed by: Curzon Film
- Release dates: 26 June 2023 (Munich Film Festival); 22 December 2023 (United Kingdom)
- Running time: 99 minutes
- Country: United Kingdom
- Language: English

Sweet Sue is a 2023 British comedy drama film directed by Leo Leigh in his feature length debut. It is starring Maggie O'Neill, Tony Pitts and Harry Trevaldwyn.

It premiered at the 2023 Munich Film Festival.

== Premise ==
A middle-aged woman starts a new relationship with an enigmatic biker, with an aspiring influencer son.

== Cast ==
- Maggie O'Neill as Sue
- Tony Pitts as Ron
- Harry Trevaldwyn as Anthony
- Anna Calder-Marshall as Ethel
- Nick Holder as Gordon
- Paul Hilton as Pete
- Hannah Walters
- Jeff Rawle
- Johann Myers
- Amaka Okafor
- Anthony Adjekum
- Anna Francolini

== Production ==
The film is the feature-length debut of director Leo Leigh. Leigh wrote the characters, structure, and story of the film and created the script in collaboration with the actors in live rehearsal. It is produced by Somesuch, SUMS Film & Media production for BBC Film. It is produced by Scott O’Donnell, Andy Brunskill and Tim Nash.

The cast is led by Maggie O'Neill, Tony Pitts and Harry Trevaldwyn and also includes Nick Holder, Anna Calder-Marshall, Paul Hilton, Hannah Walters, Jeff Rawle, Johann Myers, Amaka Okafor, Anthony Adjekum and Anna Francolini. Principal photography took place in December 2021.

== Release ==
Sweet Sue premiered at the 2023 Munich Film Festival. The film was released in the United Kingdom on 22 December 2023.

== Reception ==
On the review aggregator website Rotten Tomatoes, Sweet Sue holds an approval rating of 88% based on 8 reviews.
