= Call My Agent! =

French comedy-drama television series

- French: Dix pour cent
- Genre: Comedy drama
- Created by: Fanny Herrero
- Starring: Camille Cottin; Thibault de Montalembert; Grégory Montel; Liliane Rovère; Fanny Sidney; Laure Calamy; Nicolas Maury; Stéfi Celma; Assaad Bouab
- Country of origin: France
- Original language: French
- No. of seasons: 4
- No. of episodes: 24

Production
- Running time: 47–67 minutes
- Production companies: France Télévisions; Mon Voisin Productions; Mother Production; Ce qui me meut

Original release
- Network: France 2
- Release: 14 October 2015 – 4 November 2020

Related
- Behind Every Star; Call My Agent: Bollywood; Call My Agent - Italia; Menajerimi Ara; Ten Percent; The Talent Agency; Call My Manager

Call My Agent! (French: Dix pour cent, lit. 'Ten Percent') is a French comedy-drama television series that premiered on France 2 on 14 October 2015. The series depicts talent agents at the fictional agency ASK (Agence Samuel Kerr) and their relationships with their actor clients, who are real, mainly French, celebrities playing themselves. It won Best Comedy Series at the 49th International Emmy Awards.

Following the success of Dix pour cent in France, Netflix bought it in 2015 and renamed it Call My Agent! It was initially planned that the television series would end after its fourth season in 2020, but in April 2021, it was announced that the show would return with a 90-minute TV film followed by a fifth season. Call My Agent! has been broadcast by ICI ARTV in Canada, TG4 in Ireland, RTS Un in Switzerland and is available worldwide on Netflix, except in India, Spain, Poland and Portugal.

A sequel film, Call My Agent! The Movie, was released on Netflix on 10 September 2026.

== Overview ==
The series follows four agents who jointly take control of a fictional talent agency (ASK, French: Agence Samuel Kerr) after the death of its founder and head. The agents attempt to manage film production crises arising from their stars' egos, financial and legal difficulties, and other complications, while also maintaining rivalries with one another for power and prestige. Most episodes focus on a single actor, their agent, and the production of a film in which they are starring. The series also depicts the agents' private lives, and how they are affected and often harmed by their busy and stressful professional lives.

== Cast and characters ==
=== Main ===
- Camille Cottin as Andréa Martel, partner and agent
- Thibault de Montalembert as Mathias Barneville, partner and agent
- Grégory Montel as Gabriel Sarda, partner and agent
- Liliane Rovère as Arlette Azémar, partner and agent
- Fanny Sidney as Camille Valentini, Andréa's assistant
- Laure Calamy as Noémie Leclerc, Mathias's assistant
- Nicolas Maury as Hervé André-Jezak, Gabriel's assistant
- Stéfi Celma as Sofia Leprince, receptionist and aspiring actor
- Assaad Bouab as Hicham Janowski (seasons 2–4)

=== Recurring ===
- Ophélia Kolb as Colette Brancillon
- Isabelle Candelier as Annick Valentini
- Philippine Leroy-Beaulieu as Catherine Barneville (seasons 1–3)
- François Civil as Hippolyte Rivière (seasons 1–2)
- Jean-Yves Chatelais as François Bréhier (seasons 1–2)
- Gabrielle Forest as Hélène Kerr (seasons 1–2)
- Antoine Croset as Antoine (since season 3)
- Anne Marivin as Élise Formain, StarMédia's artistic agent (season 4)
- Stéphane Freiss as Igor de Serisy, producer (season 4)
- Sarah Suco as Justine, Igor's assistant (season 4)

=== Supporting ===
- Dominique Besnehard as Paul Granier
- Arben Bajraktaraj as Gabor Rajevski
- Robert Plagnol as Clément
- Anthony Sonigo as Augustin
- Olivia Côte as Armelle Borzek
- Igor Mendjisky as Stephane Freiss
- Marie Berto as Marie-Sophie Garnier
- Lee Delong as Miranda Jones
- Maud Amour as Mathurine
- Kader Boukhanef as Samir Chouke
- Amelie Etasse as Magali
- Nina Gary as Emma Simonet
- Julie Nicolet as Nathalie
- Alain Rimoux as Samuel Kerr
- Elise Lhomeau as Clémentine
- Éric Naggar as Duplay
- Vladimir Perrin as Jonathan Joubert
- Serge Noël as Michel Marteau
- Agnès Château as Michèle Marteau
- Marc Brunet as Mayor Caillot
- Khereddine Ennasri as Saïd
- Sarah-Megan Allouch-Mainier as Karine
- Lucille O'Flanagan-Le Cam as Linda Gérard

=== The actors ===
They appear as themselves, in most cases for a single episode.

Season 1 (2015)
Episode 1: Cécile de France
Episode 2: Line Renaud & Françoise Fabian
Episode 3: Nathalie Baye, Laura Smet, Gilles Lellouche & Zinedine Soualem
Episode 4: Audrey Fleurot
Episode 5: Julie Gayet, JoeyStarr & Zinedine Soualem
Episode 6: François Berléand

Season 2 (2017)
Episode 1: Michel Drucker, Virginie Efira, Ramzy Bedia
Episode 2: Fabrice Luchini & Christophe Lambert
Episode 3: Julien Doré, Norman Thavaud & Aymeline Valade
Episode 4: Isabelle Adjani & Julien Doré
Episode 5: Guy Marchand & Julien Doré
Episode 6: Juliette Binoche

Season 3 (2018)
Episode 1: Jean Dujardin
Episode 2: Monica Bellucci & Julien Doré
Episode 3: Gérard Lanvin, Julien Doré & Guy Marchand
Episode 4: Isabelle Huppert & Cédric Kahn
Episode 5: Béatrice Dalle
Episode 6: Jean Dujardin, Monica Bellucci, Gérard Lanvin, Audrey Fleurot, Claude Lelouch, JoeyStarr, Françoise Fabian & Line Renaud

Season 4 (2020)
Episode 1: Charlotte Gainsbourg, Mimie Mathy & Julie Gayet
Episode 2: Franck Dubosc & Nathalie Baye
Episode 3: José Garcia
Episode 4: Sandrine Kiberlain, Muriel Robin & Mimie Mathy
Episode 5: Sigourney Weaver
Episode 6: Jean Reno

== Episodes ==
Series	Episodes	Originally released	
Series	Episodes	First released	Last released
1	6	14 October 2015	28 October 2015
2	6	19 April 2017	10 May 2017
3	6	14 November 2018	28 November 2018
4	6	21 October 2020	4 November 2020

=== Season 1 (2015) ===
No. overall	No. in series	Title	Original release date	Guest(s)	France viewers (millions)
1	1	"Cécile"	14 October 2015	Cécile de France	5.2
At the talent agency Agence Samuel Kerr (ASK), agent Gabriel Sarda is reluctant to break the news to actress Cécile de France that she has been rejected for a role in a forthcoming Quentin Tarantino film because she is too old. Camille Valentini, who has recently arrived in Paris, visits the office to meet agent Mathias Barneville. He appears to know her in some way, but persuades her to leave. On her way out, she lands a job as Andréa Martel's assistant, to Mathias's dismay. Later, in the lift, Camille unwittingly reveals the truth to Cécile. Feeling betrayed by her agent, Cécile leaves the agency, but Mathias manages to get her back and confirms the role in the Tarantino film subject to her undergoing cosmetic surgery. However, Gabriel persuades her to do otherwise and rekindles his agency relationship with her. Camille is fired for her revelation to Cécile, but is rehired by Andréa for obtaining confidential pay information on another agent's client. The team receives news of the accidental death of Samuel Kerr, head of the agency, after swallowing a wasp while on vacation in Brazil.
2	2	"Line and Françoise"	14 October 2015	Line Renaud & Françoise Fabian	4.4
Upset by Samuel's death, Françoise Fabian decides to drop out of a film three weeks before the start of filming and ends her relationship with the agency. Andréa tries to convince her to return, while at the same time, Gabriel offers the role to Line Renaud, Fabian's longtime rival, who accepts. Andréa and Gabriel fall out over what she sees as his betrayal. Camille meets Hippolyte, an aspiring actor, and begins to develop feelings for him. Hélène Kerr, who inherited her husband's majority stake in the company, tells the four agents that she will sell her shares; they make her an offer but are unable to afford all the shares. At Samuel's wake, Renaud and Fabian eulogise Samuel, they reconcile, and both agree to appear in the film. Andréa and Gabriel reconcile. Camille discovers to her horror that Hippolyte is Mathias's son and therefore her half-brother; she breaks things off with him.
3	3	"Nathalie and Laura"	21 October 2015	Nathalie Baye, Laura Smet, Gilles Lellouche, Zinedine Soualem & Dominique Besnehard	4.3
Clients Nathalie Baye and Laura Smet, mother and daughter, face a dilemma when they are asked to appear in a Swedish director's next film, a claustrophobic two-hander set on a remote island and at sea. Both like the idea, but believe that the rigours of spending several months of filming together 24 hours a day will jeopardise their relationship. They both take steps to be rejected for their parts and succeed in losing them. Meanwhile, the agency is subject to a tax audit, conducted by Colette Brancillon, whom Andréa earlier rejected on a dating website. Mathias arranges for Camille to receive an invitation to the César Awards and an internship offer with a film producer, but she turns it down in favour of training as an agent. Gabriel attends Sofia's play and agrees to become her agent. Mathias is invited to join a rival agency, StarMédia, with his clients, but knows that it will destroy ASK if he accepts.
4	4	"Audrey"	21 October 2015	Audrey Fleurot	4.1
Audrey Fleurot has recently had two children and has not worked for a while. She is desperate for cash because the tax authorities demand two years of unpaid taxes. At first, she accepts the role of an environmental activist stripper, but the challenges of the role (including filming in Canada for a month and learning to pole dance) lead her to decline it. Mathias finds her something less onerous. In an attempt to blunt the tax audit, Andréa attempts to seduce Colette, with little initial success. Gabriel struggles to find Sofia work but eventually does so in a typecast role. Sofia is delighted. Hélène Kerr has found a buyer for the agency, a German rival. Mathias accepts StarMédia's offer but before he can sign the others find out and are furious with him. When the news reaches the German buyer it pulls out and Camille persuades her colleagues that Mathias's move was a clever ploy to defeat the acquirer.
5	5	"Julie and Joey"	28 October 2015	Julie Gayet, Joeystarr & Zinedine Soualem	4.2
Andréa has succeeded in seducing Colette, in whom she appears to be sincerely interested. She conceals the affair from Gabriel. Julie Gayet and JoeyStarr are supposed to play lovers in a period movie, but in real life seem to hate each other; their bickering disrupts shooting. Their agents, Andréa and Gabriel, try to save the film from disaster and visit the set. An accident during filming results in Julie and Joey more than reconciling. Sofia has a small role in the film but because of the delays due to the stars' fighting, her main scene is cut; she puts a good face on it. Mathias's father-in-law offers him a loan to buy Samuel Kerr's shares in ASK. It's Camille's birthday, which Mathias, her father, has forgotten to her disappointment. Mathias learns a big client will be killed off on a soap opera and Camille sets up an online petition to protest. Mathias is impressed and belatedly remembers her birthday. He and Camille are celebrating with champagne in his office when his wife and Hippolyte surprise them. To allay his wife's suspicions and stop Hippolyte from hitting on Camille, Mathias says he has a confession to make.
6	6	"François"	28 October 2015	François Berléand	4.2
Mathias's wife, Catherine, discovers that his affair with Camille's mother coincided with her own pregnancy. She throws him out of their apartment and the loan from her father to fund the acquisition of the agency is in doubt. François Berléand is to play Dom Juan in an avant-garde theatre production set in a swimming pool, but cannot swim and so doesn't want to get in the pool leading to a dispute with the director. At Andréa's suggestion, the director invites François to his birthday party. Gabriel gets Sofia an audition for a Luc Besson movie for which she must be able to dance hip-hop; she cannot. At the party François confesses his fear to the director and they reconcile. Andréa is due to meet Colette but is delayed at the party where she drinks too much and makes out with a strange girl. Colette surprises them and dumps Andréa even though she begs for forgiveness. Sofia fails the audition and falls out with Gabriel over his unconscious bias; later they reconcile at Gabriel's apartment but Andréa turns up distraught and Sofia leaves. Colette tells the ASK team that they are going to be fined and prosecuted for tax and expense fraud, including claims for a personal hotel room and socks. Under such a sanction the agency is worthless. Andréa makes a last abortive attempt to get Colette back. Gabriel and Sofia make out, and then find everyone drinking Samuel's whiskey.

=== Season 2 (2017) ===
No. overall	No. in series	Title	Original release date	Guest(s)	France viewers (millions)
7	1	"Virginie and Ramzy"	19 April 2017	Virginie Efira, Ramzy Bedia & Michel Drucker	3.4
Mathias's clients Virginie Efira and Ramzy Bédia are promoting their new film and make much of their equal pay. Paparazzi photograph Virginie in the arms of an "old friend". Ramzy throws her out and stops promoting the film. Virginie stays with Mathias and is photographed being comforted by him. Andréa meets Hicham Janowski, a former classmate, when they are being honoured in their hometown. She tries to interest Hicham in investing in ASK as he has sold his internet dating site for €200m. She takes him to a shoot but he is insulted there. As he leaves in a hurry, Andréa is hit by a falling light, breaking one of her front teeth. Catherine has seen the photos of him with Virginie and decides to proceed with a divorce as she can no longer trust him. The boss of StarMédia reveals to Virginie that she and Ramzy have not received the same fee for their film as he has a secret second contract. This second contract obligates Ramzy to appear on Michel Drucker's talk show to promote the film and he is unexpectedly joined by Virginie, who tells him she knows about the secret contract. He says that he signed it for them both and shifts any blame onto Mathias; they reconcile. They meet Mathias for lunch and sack him, saying that they are moving to StarMédia. Andréa (tooth repaired) and Mathias arrive at work and find Hicham there.
8	2	"Fabrice Luchini"	19 April 2017	Fabrice Luchini & Christophe Lambert	3.1
In payback for the loss of Virginie and Ramzy, Hicham pressures the agents to poach StarMédia's biggest client, Fabrice Luchini. Andréa takes on the challenge and contrives a number of meetings, including one with an actress impersonating the James Bond casting agent, as it has always been Fabrice's dream to be cast as a Bond villain. Sofia goes to an audition where she is accused of sleeping with Gabriel to further her career; she throws a stool at the director. Hicham advises Gabriel to give Sofia to another agent and says he wants to recruit a junior agent to handle emerging stars. Fabrice is convinced of Andréa's sincerity after she opens up about her failed affair with Colette, but StarMédia's boss reveals the James Bond scam to him, leaving him confused. Noémie has convinced herself that Camille is the daughter of actor Christophe Lambert, leading to confusion when he visits the agency. Hicham sacks Andréa for failing to win Fabrice as a client but immediately reinstates her when he overhears Fabrice phone to say that he is joining ASK. Noémie and Mathias begin a relationship.
9	3	"Norman"	26 April 2017	Norman Thavaud, Julien Doré & Aymeline Valade	3.6
Norman Thavaud can't drive so Gabriel does all he can to help Norman pass his test so that he can appear in a Jacques Audiard film. Meanwhile he arranges for Sofia to meet Julien Doré in the hope that he will use her in a singing role. Mathias advises her to stick to one thing, acting. Hicham wants an epic party for his visiting son Elvis's 10th birthday and tasks Camille with planning it. Andréa meets with model Aymeline Valade, to whom she is obviously attracted, as is Hicham; she warns him off hitting on clients. Norman passes his test thanks to taking Beta blockers for his anxiety. Camille's mother, Annick, is visiting and they go to the Grand Colbert for lunch; Mathias joins them but then so does Catherine; confusion ensues. Norman, Julien and Aymeline all attend the birthday party. Norman is a great success with the kids and, fueled by Beta blockers and champagne, takes off with Elvis and two friends in Hicham's Mustang. Aymeline makes out with Hicham and Andréa but leaves as they concentrate on each other. Julien and Sofia sing together. Norman is arrested for DUI and Gabriel ends up jailed as well. Norman rejects the film role but Gabriel convinces him to go ahead.
10	4	"Isabelle"	26 April 2017	Isabelle Adjani & Julien Doré	3.2
Isabelle Adjani is keen to work with a successful young German director but Andréa's efforts to arrange a meeting come to naught, not least because the director has taken umbrage at a perceived slight by Isabelle. Four years before, Mathias rejected an award-winning script by the director on Isabelle's behalf and without her knowledge; he is now keen to prevent the meeting so that the truth is not discovered. He recruits Camille to help. Sofia has hit it off with Julien and goes for a voice test with Gabriel even though she is now Mathias's client. Gabriel is jealous of the attention that Julien is devoting to her. Eventually Sofia is hired to provide all the music and appear in Julien's new film; Gabriel is jealous. Camille goes to great lengths to make sure that Isabelle and the director do not meet but cannot prevent it. The truth comes out and Camille takes responsibility for rejecting the script even though she didn't work at the agency four years earlier. Isabelle and the director storm out and seem to be lost as clients. The agents are concerned by Camille's behaviour and consider sacking her; Mathias prevents this by admitting that she was acting on his behalf and acknowledges her as his daughter.
11	5	"Guy"	10 May 2017	Guy Marchand & Julien Doré	3.4
Guy Marchand becomes forgetful while shooting a film; Gabriel takes him to see a specialist, who finds that he has had a minor stroke. There is uncertainty over whether Guy is fit to continue in the role and the insurer visits the set to examine him. Andrea discovers that she is pregnant after her tryst with Hicham. She seeks out Collette to tell her. Hicham announces that Camille is to be the new junior agent even though she didn't apply for the job. None of her colleagues (including Mathias) supports the decision. Hervé is particularly disappointed as he hoped for the role himself; he calls her a "Judas". Also visiting the set of Guy's film is the financier, who is also looking at financing Julien's film; Gabriel tries to sabotage that film because of his jealousy. Arlette, an old flame of Guy's, visits the set of the film and helps him convince the insurer to continue cover. The financing for Julien's film doesn't come through so Sofia's big chance seems gone; Gabriel dissembles. Mathias returns home and becomes emotional. Camille is very unhappy and decides to leave the agency and go home to Cannes.
12	6	"Juliette"	10 May 2017	Juliette Binoche	3.3
Andréa's client Juliette Binoche is set to be the mistress of ceremonies for the Cannes Film Festival, but has issues with her overly fussy opening night designer dress and a persistent producer who keeps trying to seduce her despite her lack of interest. Andréa works hard to make Juliette happy but is surprised when the festival organizer suggests that Juliette exchange favours with the producer for her career. Noémie scores a ticket to Cannes and is intent on surprising Mathias, but before she can leave, Catherine tells her that she plans to reconcile with Mathias at Cannes, causing Noémie to cancel her plans and stay in Paris. Hicham discovers that Andréa is pregnant. Right before the opening ceremony, Juliette is stalked by the producer and manages to dissuade him by coming on to him forcefully. Just before she is due to walk onstage, Juliette destroys her gown. Disaster is averted when she jettisons her carefully prepared speech to give an impassioned salute to women in film. Encouraged by Catherine, Mathias reconciles with Camille and invites her to a Cannes afterparty. There, Sofia discovers Gabriel sabotaged the funding for her film and leaves him. Andréa receives an offer to head the European branch of a New York talent agency and asks Camille to come with her.

=== Season 3 (2018) ===
No. overall	No. in series	Title	Original release date	Guest(s)	France viewers (millions)
13	1	"Jean"	14 November 2018	Jean Dujardin	4.3
Andréa is determined to bring in more money than Mathias before the financial reports for ASK are due but hits a road block when Jean Dujardin fails to sign the contract for his next film. When she goes to find out why, she discovers he is still deep in character from his last film as a WWI soldier forced to survive on his own in the woods. Andréa is seven months pregnant and in a committed relationship with Colette, but their relationship is complicated by baby gifts from Hicham. Sofia, now a full-time actress, visits the office to show the poster for the film she made with Julien Doré. Gabriel plunges further into depression and stops visiting clients. Camille tries to balance her role as both Andréa's assistant and a junior agent but struggles to attract new clients. At a meeting announcing the final earnings of the team, Hicham congratulates everyone except Gabriel, whose numbers have drastically fallen since breaking up with Sofia. Hicham announces he will be directly supervising his work from now on.
14	2	"Monica"	14 November 2018	Monica Bellucci & Julien Doré	3.8
Hicham forces Gabriel to deal with his out-of-control to-do list, starting by signing Monica Bellucci to a deal with Cartier. During their meeting, Bellucci opens up about her love life and admits she is tired of dating businessmen and actors. She enlists Gabriel's help to meet a regular man, but things go awry when she keeps striking out and ends up flirting with Gabriel instead. The two later end up bonding over their broken hearts. After a conversation with Mathias about whether he regrets missing large parts of Camille's life, Hicham decides he wants to revisit his decision to stay out of Andréa's life and let her raise their child with Colette. When Mathias catches Noémie talking to Hervé about her love affair with a married man, he calls her into his office to discipline her, but she quits out of shame, pretending to have been head-hunted for a different job. While brokenheartedly wandering around Paris, she is accidentally struck by Catherine's car. Catherine persuades Noémie to reconsider her decision to quit.
15	3	"Gérard"	21 November 2018	Gérard Lanvin, Julien Doré & Guy Marchand	3.3
Andréa and Gabriel prepare to leave the agency to form their own. Gérard Lanvin asks Mathias to arrange an audition for a small role in his latest film for a friendly barista. Mathias pawns the work off on Camille, who accidentally sends the barista to audition for the role of the co-lead. To everyone's surprise, the barista, Sami, has an amazing audition, leading Camille to represent him, but complications arise when Gérard begins to loathe Sami. Julien Doré's film is a huge flop despite Gabriel's attempts to boost ticket sales for Sofia. Sofia reveals to Julien that Gabriel tanked the initial funding for the film, but to her disgust, Julien is grateful that the lower budget allowed him more artistic freedom.
16	4	"Isabelle"	21 November 2018	Isabelle Huppert & Cédric Kahn	3
Mathias gets a tip that someone is planning to leave the agency and suspects Andréa, who is on maternity leave. He sets about trying to convince her and Gabriel to stay by being as kind as possible. Gabriel has to deal with his workaholic client Isabelle Huppert, who is in violation of her contract as she secretly films two projects simultaneously. When both suddenly require her presence on the same night, it is up to Gabriel to cover up her mistake, but Isabelle keeps saying yes to more and more work. Mathias resumes his affair with Noémie and seeks her help in trying to remove Hicham from the agency.
17	5	"Béatrice"	28 November 2018	Béatrice Dalle	3
Andréa is supposed to be on maternity leave but receives a call from Béatrice Dalle, who is angry with the director of her latest film for surprising her with a nude scene she finds gratuitous. When Andréa cannot get Béatrice out of the nude scene, Béatrice begins sabotaging other scenes. A heart-to-heart with the director finally allows them to resolve the scene in a way that satisfies them both. The agency is being sued for violation of contract after Huppert's voice gives out and she is discovered to have been working on two films. Behind the scenes, Mathias manipulates Hicham into aggravating the American company that is suing them while pretending to give him sage advice. Hervé tries to send his handsome actor student boyfriend on auditions, but his terrible acting and bad temper destroy his chances. After holding his biological daughter Flora and witnessing the bond between Andréa, Colette and her, Hicham renounces his parental rights so Colette can adopt his child. As a result, Andréa and Gabriel decide to abandon their plan to form their own agency, but Andréa accidentally calls Hicham and leaves him a message about it instead. Angry and disappointed, Hicham considers selling his shares of ASK to Mathias, but Gabriel realizes that the leak about Huppert's breach of contract came from ASK.
18	6	"ASK"	28 November 2018	Monica Bellucci, Jean Dujardin, Françoise Fabian, Audrey Fleurot, Gérard Lanvin, Claude Lelouch, Line Renaud, JoeyStarr & Dominique Besnehard	2.9
Gabriel, Andréa, Hicham and Arlette quickly realize it was Mathias who betrayed them to the Americans. Hicham nevertheless decides to sell his shares to Mathias and let him figure out how to deal with the Americans. Arlette quickly realizes Mathias must secretly have a way out of paying them. As ASK prepares for its 30th anniversary party, Andréa, Arlette and Gabriel brainstorm how to be rid of the American lawsuit so that Mathias's leverage is gone. They decide to pretend that Huppert was not on another set but that a different actress with the same name was on set shooting a scene at the same time. Andréa finds another Isabelle Huppert, a nurse, and convinces her to film a scene she wrote, enlisting Sofia to act opposite her. At the ASK party, Catherine admits to Mathias she is having an affair and the two separate. Andréa and Gabriel present their explanation to the Americans, who are initially skeptical but eventually fall for it. Hicham decides not to sell his shares and fires Mathias. Noémie steals his client files and decides to leave with him. Sofia plans to leave Paris as she has not been able to find work in six months. She is offered her old job working as a receptionist but is shocked when, while working, she learns she has been nominated for the César Award for Most Promising Actress.

=== Season 4 (2020) ===
No. overall	No. in series	Title	Original release date	Guest(s)	France viewers (millions)
19	1	"Charlotte"	21 October 2020	Charlotte Gainsbourg, Mimie Mathy, Xavier Beauvois & Julie Gayet	4.2
An overworked Andréa cannot find the time to read scripts and tells Charlotte Gainsbourg her childhood friend's script is amazing and she should star in his film, before discovering it is a dud. Charlotte realizes how terrible the film is in rehearsals and pressures Andréa to get her out of it, leading Andréa to lie to Charlotte's friend that she has broken her leg. When he insists on proceeding with the film anyway, Charlotte finally tells him the truth, but while chasing after him to apologize, she falls and actually does break her leg. Gabriel and the rest of the agency are desperate to retain Mathias's clients but do not know his next move as he is staying silent on the subject even after leaving.
20	2	"Franck"	21 October 2020	Franck Dubosc, Nathalie Baye & Tony Parker	3.5
Gabriel is tasked with keeping Franck Dubosc on as a client. He visits him on the set of his latest film, a gritty realist drama starring a hot new César-winning actor. Franck is miserable and planning to quit the film, but after Gabriel yells at him that he is stuck in a rut, he decides to take advantage of the opportunity to expand his horizons and eventually goes too method while acting and punches his co-star for real during a take. Andréa ditches dinner with Colette to try to keep Danny Boon on as a client. Mathias begins work as a producer and promotes Noémie. She urges him to make their relationship public, but it backfires when a previously friendly assistant starts to ignore her after realizing Noémie and Mathias are sleeping together.
21	3	"José"	28 October 2020	José Garcia & Valérie Donzelli	4
Andréa struggles to take care of Flora on her own after Colette abandons her. She is called in to manage José Garcia, who keeps ruining takes because the cinematographer is a woman he had a passionate affair with 20 years earlier. Former StarMédia agent Élise Forman and her clients come to work at ASK. Everyone is happy with the change except Gabriel, who suspects she is spying on ASK for StarMédia. Noémie is sad about having no social life, so Mathias arranges a dinner party for them and a co-worker. Noémie is thrilled until she realizes the guest brought his mistress and not his wife to dinner.
22	4	"Sandrine"	28 October 2020	Sandrine Kiberlain, Muriel Robin, Valérie Donzelli, Mimie Mathy & Marina Rollman	3.4
Sandrine Kiberlain is bored after her final performance in a critically acclaimed play. Gabriel urges her to sign on to a glamorous period piece, but on a whim she decides to try stand-up comedy. To dissuade her, Gabriel enlists Muriel Robin to convince her that a comedian's life is hard, but it backfires when he annoys Muriel so much she wants to help Sandrine just to piss him off. Camille is on the verge of making her first big deal, convincing the writer of a best-selling book to sign over the rights to her work to an unproven director Camille represents. She celebrates over drinks with Noémie, who later inadvertently reveals the key to the writer's heart to Matthias, who uses the information to poach the writer. Both Camille and Noémie are furious about the betrayal.
23	5	"Sigourney"	4 November 2020	Sigourney Weaver, Guillaume Gallienne, Bernard Verley & Rayane Bensetti	3.8
Sigourney Weaver arrives in Paris having signed on to a film without reading the script. She is furious when she realizes that Gaspard Ulliel, who she assumed would play her lover, only has a small cameo and the actor playing her love interest is Bernard Verley, who is much older. She enlists Andréa's help in getting director Guillaume Gallienne to change his mind and cast Ulliel as her love interest. Gabriel enlists Hervé's help in spying on Élise Formain. Camille believes her betrayal caused Mathias's heart attack and avoids going to the hospital to visit him. Meanwhile, Noémie tells Mathias he might have betrayed too many people, leading him to reflect on his choices in life.
24	6	"Jean"	4 November 2020	Jean Reno, Lolita Chammah	3.4
As ASK is on the verge of bankruptcy, Mathias pitches his film on the Storming of the Bastille with Xavier Beauvois to Jean Reno. The only problem is that Reno is shooting a film where he stars as Santa Claus and the experience is so miserable he has decided to quit acting. With their future at ASK in doubt, everyone starts making alternative plans. Camille considers starting her own agency for young talent, Hervé decides he wants to commit to acting, Gabriel makes a startling decision to join StarMédia, and Andréa, with no cards left to play, starts being honest in both her professional and personal lives.

== Production ==
=== Director ===
Cédric Klapisch, Lola Doillon and Antoine Garceau directed two episodes of the first season.

Laurent Tirard directed two episodes, Antoine Garceau and Jeanne Herry directed one episode of the second season.

=== Writers ===
Dominique Besnehard, Fanny Herrero, Julien Messemackers, Michel Vereecken, Sabrina B. Karine, Anais Carpita, Quoc Dang Tran, Nicolas Mercier, Camille Chamoux, Camille de Castelnau, Cécile Ducrocq, Benjamin Dupas and Eliane Montane wrote the first season.

=== Producers ===
Dominique Besnehard, Cédric Klapisch, Michel Feller, Aurelien Larger and Harold Valentin produced the series.

=== Filming ===
The first season was filmed from November 2014 to February 2015. The second season was shot from September to December 2016.

== Awards and nominations ==
Award	Year	Category	Nominee(s)	Result	Ref.
Critics' Choice Television Awards	2021	Best Foreign Language Series		Nominated	
Globes de Cristal Awards	2018	Best Television Film or Television Series	Fanny Herrero; Mother Production	Won	
Globes de Cristal Awards	2019	Best Actor - Television Film or Television Series	Grégory Montel	Won	
Globes de Cristal Awards	2019	Best Actress - Television Film or Television Series	Camille Cottin	Won	
Globes de Cristal Awards	2019	Best Television Film or Television Series	Fanny Herrero	Won	
Globes de Cristal Awards	2019	Best Actor - Television Film or Television Series	Thibault de Montalembert	Nominated	
International Emmy Awards	2016	Best Comedy Series		Nominated	
International Emmy Awards	2021	Best Comedy Series	Dominique Besnehard Michel Feller Harold Valentin Aurelien Larger	Won	
ACS Awards	2016	Best Actress	Camille Cottin	Won	
ACS Awards	2016	Best Series		Won	
ACS Awards	2016	Best Writing	Fanny Herrero	Won	
ACS Awards	2016	Best Actor	Thibault de Montalembert	Nominated	
ACS Awards	2016	Best Actor	Grégory Montel	Nominated	
ACS Awards	2016	Best Direction	Cédric Klapisch	Nominated	
ACS Awards	2016	Best Production	Mon Voisin Productions; Mother Production	Nominated	
ACS Awards	2017	Best Actress	Camille Cottin	Won	
ACS Awards	2017	Best Actor	Nicolas Maury	Nominated	
ACS Awards	2017	Best Series	France 2	Nominated	
ACS Awards	2017	Best Writing	Fanny Herrero	Nominated	
ACS Awards	2017	Best Actor	Grégory Montel	Nominated	
ACS Awards	2017	Best Actress	Laure Calamy	Nominated	
ACS Awards	2021	Best Series	Dominique Besnehard; Michel Feller; Harold Valentin; Aurélien Larger; Mother Production; Mon Voisin Productions	Nominated	

== Adaptations ==
- A Turkish version was released in 2020 under the name Menajerimi Ara. Gay themes were removed in that version.
- A British version was shot in 2021 and premiered on Amazon Prime in select regions in April 2022 under the title Ten Percent. In the United States, it is on AMC Networks's BBC America, Sundance Now, and AMC+.
- Studio Dragon and Baram Pictures produced a South Korean adaptation called Behind Every Star that aired its first season on tvN in November 2022. Cast in the lead roles are Lee Seo-jin, Kwak Sun-young, Seo Hyun-woo and Joo Hyun-young.
- On 26 August 2021, an Indian adaptation was announced by Netflix, titled Call My Agent: Bollywood.
- An Italian adaptation produced by Sky debuted on 20 January 2023, titled Call My Agent - Italia.
- Further adaptations include one set in the Middle East by MBC, a Malaysian one by Astro and a Polish one by TVN.
- In March 2023, Mediawan announced that the television series will be adapted in Spanish for Latin America and the United States, with Eva Longoria as producer, who will also direct the first two episodes.
- On 12 June 2023 Prima announced that it was producing with TV JOJ the Czech and Slovak version called Vytoč mého agenta (Vytoč môjho agenta). It debuted on 10 January 2024.
- An Indonesian adaptation produced by Disney+ Hotstar, titled Hubungi Agen Gue!, premiered on 29 July 2023.
- A German remake, titled Call My Agent Berlin, was released on Disney+ and on Hulu on 12 September 2025.
- A Chinese remake is in development.
- A Filipino adaptation called Call My Manager was released HBO Max on August 27, 2026.

=== Counterparts ===
	French	Turkish	Indian (Hindi)	British	Polish	Korean	Indonesian	Czech/Slovak	German
	Dix pour cent	Menajerimi Ara	Call My Agent: Bollywood	Ten Percent	Mój agent	Behind Every Star	Hubungi Agen Gue!	Vytoč mého agenta/Vytoč môjho agenta	Call My Agent Berlin
Agency	ASK (Agence Samuel Kerr)	EGO	ART	Nightingale Hart	AAK (Agencja aktorska Krantz)	Method Entertainment	ASA+ (Agensi Surya Adhiwangsa+)	SA (Stein Agency)	Stern
Location	Paris	Istanbul	Mumbai	London	Warsaw	Seoul	Jakarta	Prague	Berlin
Female Agent	Andréa Martel (Camille Cottin)	Feris Dikmen (Canan Ergüder)	Amal Ahmed (Aahana Kumra)	Rebecca Fox (Lydia Leonard)	Aga Lewińska (Aleksandra Pisula)	Chun Jae-in/ Jane (Kwak Sun-young)	Amel (Hannah Al Rashid)	Andrea Martenová (Martha Issová)	Sascha (Karin Hanczewski)
Male Senior Agent	Mathias Barneville (Thibault de Montalembert)	Kıraç Özdal (Barış Falay)	Monty (Rajat Kapoor)	Jonathan Nightingale (Jack Davenport)	Marek Kreczmar (Marek Gierszał)	Ma Tae-oh/ Matthew (Lee Seo-jin)	Ricky Nugraha (Donny Damara)	Marian Klimek (Tomáš Maštalír)	Gabor Reichenberg (Lucas Gregorowicz)
Male Agent	Gabriel Sarda (Grégory Montel)	Çınar Bilgin (Fatih Artman)	Mehershad (Ayush Mehra)	Dan Bala (Prasanna Puwanarajah)	Gabriel Piech (Maciej Maciejewski)	Kim Jung-don (Seo Hyun-woo)	Yudhis Maningka (Yoga Pratama)	Jiří Beneš (Kryštof Hádek)	Kostantin (Michael Klammer)
Female Senior Agent	Arlette Azémar (Liliane Rovère)	Peride Şener (Ayşenil Şamlıoğlu)	Treasa (Soni Razdan)	Stella Hart (Maggie Steed)	Mira Kornacka (Ewa Szykulska)	Shim So-young (Shim Myeong-ae)	Lydia Kandou (Lydia Kandou)	Yveta Lorencová (Zuzana Kronerová)	Helen Miller (Gabrielle Scharnitzky)
New assistant	Camille Valentini (Fanny Sidney)	Dicle Ertem (Ahsen Eroğlu)	Nia (Radhika Seth)	Misha Virani (Hiftu Quasem)	Dorota Rajkowska (Paulina Walendziak)	So Hyun-joo (Joo Hyun-young)	Kamila Sekarsari (Sheryl Sheinafia)	Kamila Luknárová (Viktória Jurištová)	Sophie (Dana Herfurth)

== See also ==
- W1A, a similar 2014 British series that satirises the management of the BBC with celebrity cameos
