= Ten Percent (TV series) =

2022 British TV comedy series

- Original release poster
- Genre: Comedy
- Based on: Call My Agent! by Fanny Herrero
- Developed by: John Morton
- Written by: John Morton; Ella Road; Keith Akushie; Cat Clarke; Bryce Hart; Abigail Wilson
- Directed by: John Morton; Sam Leifer; Jessica Swale
- Creative director: Candida Otton
- Starring: Jack Davenport; Lydia Leonard; Maggie Steed; Prasanna Puwanarajah; Hiftu Quasem; Fola Evans-Akingbola; Rebecca Humphries; Harry Trevaldwyn; Eléonore Arnaud; Edward Bluemel; Jack Holden; Natasha Little; Tim McInnerny; Chelsey Crisp
- Music by: Rael Jones
- Country of origin: United Kingdom
- Original language: English
- No. of seasons: 1
- No. of episodes: 8

Production
- Producer: Sarah Curtis
- Cinematography: Simon Tindall
- Editor: Robin Hill
- Production companies: Bron Studios; Headline Pictures; Amazon Studios

Original release
- Network: Amazon Prime Video
- Release: 28 April 2022

Ten Percent is a British comedy television series based on the French series Call My Agent! (titled Dix pour cent in French, which translates as 'ten per cent'); both are set in talent agencies that see turbulence when their founder unexpectedly dies. The London talent agency, Nightingale Hart, has agents Jonathan Nightingale (Jack Davenport), Rebecca Fox (Lydia Leonard), Stella Hart (Maggie Steed), and Dan Bala (Prasanna Puwanarajah), interact with celebrity clients, featuring many real actors portraying versions of themselves. It was originally released in select markets on Amazon Prime Video on 28 April 2022, also being shown in the United States on BBC America.

It was cancelled after one series.

== Premise ==
Misha has decided to follow her absent father, Jonathan, and grandfather, Richard, in their talent agent career, arriving at London agency Nightingale Hart just in time to be spontaneously hired as an assistant when one is fired. Shortly after Misha joins, Richard dies, and Jonathan and another agent, Stella, discover the agency is struggling financially. Jonathan also struggles to keep his family from realising who Misha really is. Meanwhile, agent Rebecca is launching a production branch of the agency and falling for Margaux, the author of the book she's set to adapt, and agent Dan tries to launch the career of their receptionist-turned-actress, Zoe – also while falling for her. Stella sorts through a different personal dilemma and supports old friend and self-sabotaging actor Simon. Misha starts to help Jonathan's son Luke become a screenwriter. They all try to handle their temperamental celebrity clients while holding off the imposition of the American company who bought the agency.

== Cast and characters ==
- Jack Davenport as Jonathan Nightingale (based on Mathias)

- Jonathan is the son of agency founder Richard, a friendly but authoritative agent. When his wife, Charlotte, was pregnant with their son, Luke, he had an affair at the Edinburgh Festival; from this affair he is also the father of Misha.

- Lydia Leonard as Rebecca Fox (based on Andréa)

- Rebecca is a passionate agent who is emotionally withdrawn in her personal life. She wants the agency to open a production division and acquires the rights to an autobiographical book written by French journalist Margaux, who she then develops a romantic interest in.

- Maggie Steed as Stella Hart (based on Arlette)

- Stella is a warm but stern agent who has been around since the start and maintains the founding ideals.

- Prasanna Puwanarajah as Dan Bala (based on Gabriel)

- Dan is a bumbling agent who takes on receptionist Zoe as a client after seeing her play, as well as dating her, but gets overly jealous.

- Hiftu Quasem as Misha Virani (based on Camille)

- Misha is a young Scottish woman who decides to follow her absent father and grandfather's career as a talent agent, being spontaneously hired to their agency. She helps Rebecca and Luke with their career aspirations.

- Fola Evans-Akingbola as Zoe Spencer (based on Sofia)

- Zoe is an aspiring actress and the receptionist of Nightingale Hart, who dates Dan.

- Rebecca Humphries as Julia Fincham (based on Noémie)

- Julia is Jonathan's attentive assistant who has had a long crush on him, she is initially cold towards Misha.

- Harry Trevaldwyn as Ollie Rogers (based on Hervé)

- Ollie is Dan's capable and fanatical assistant, who develops a quick friendship with Misha and a crush on the new American assistant, Kevin.

- Eléonore Arnaud as Margaux Martorana (based on Colette)

- Margaux is a French journalist and war correspondent who sells the film rights to her book to Rebecca, also getting into a tumultuous relationship with her.

- Edward Bluemel as Luke Nightingale (based on Hippolyte)

- Luke is an aspiring screenwriter who gives his scripts to Misha to vet for the agency, nervous to approach his father.

- Jack Holden as Kevin

- Kevin is the new American assistant, who cannot stop smiling and appeasing his bosses; he gets dumped by his boyfriend after moving to London.

- Natasha Little as Charlotte Nightingale (based on Catherine)

- Charlotte is Jonathan's wife and Luke's mother, and a dance teacher. She is friendly, and is kind to Misha before and after discovering her husband's affair.

- Tim McInnerny as Simon Gould

- Simon is an old friend of Richard and Stella who has been an unsuccessful actor from the agency's start; though talented, he suffers from self-doubt and alcoholism.

- Chelsey Crisp as Kirsten Furst

- Kirsten is an American executive who comes in to oversee the agency, causing cultural conflicts. She has an unhealthy relationship with her American boss, and is a recovering alcoholic.

Jim Broadbent played Richard Nightingale, the agency's founder (based on Samuel), who in the series is also the father of Jonathan. Smurf the dog portrays Stella's loyal dog, named Mathias (based on Arlette's dog, Jean Gabin). The characters Simon Gould, played by McInnerny, Kirsten Furst, played by Crisp, and Kevin, played by Holden, are original creations for the British series.

== Production ==
John Morton adapted the French series Call My Agent! (Dix pour cent) for British television, after the success of his original British workplace satires Twenty Twelve and W1A, the latter of which centred on the running of the BBC and had celebrity cameos. Morton felt there were two directions the adaptation could have gone, portraying the agent-client relationships either cynically or affectionately; he decided he wanted to take the latter route, which also aligned best with the tone of the original series.

== Episodes ==
No. overall	No. in series	Title	Original release date	Guest(s)
1	1	"Episode 1"	28 April 2022	Kelly Macdonald
2	2	"Episode 2"	28 April 2022	Helena Bonham Carter and Olivia Williams
3	3	"Episode 3"	28 April 2022	Dominic West
4	4	"Episode 4"	28 April 2022	Emma Corrin and Himesh Patel
5	5	"Episode 5"	28 April 2022	Phoebe Dynevor
6	6	"Episode 6"	28 April 2022	David Oyelowo and Jessica Oyelowo
7	7	"Episode 7"	28 April 2022	Clémence Poésy
8	8	"Episode 8"	28 April 2022	David Harewood

== Release ==
The series was released in select regions on Amazon Prime Video on 28 April 2022, on SundanceNow and AMC+ in the United States on 29 April 2022, and began airing with weekly episodes on BBC America from 1 May 2022.

== Reception ==
The series was received mildly, with critics saying that, based on the first two episodes, it is generally pleasant but is almost a direct copy of the original French series.

Rachel Cooke of the New Statesman thought the celebrity cameos were unimpressive, using "cut-price" actors compared to the original, which lessened the impact of the setting, but said she would personally continue watching. Camilla Long for The Times was instead pleased with the cameos, but found its release on subscription streaming platform Amazon off-putting and the series lacking in entertainment value.

Variety's Scott Bryan, and Rebecca Nicholson of The Guardian found it enjoyable but too faithful to the original French series to be necessary: Bryan did think the dialogue was particularly good, and Nicholson said that "it also shares some of the original's jaunty spirit and bounce", though felt it was not as funny as it should have been. She suggested that viewers who have not seen the original would enjoy it more, as the direct similarities made it more of a re-watch. Conversely, Sophie Gilbert for The Atlantic found it charming and, though much alike the original, to have a distinctly British sensibility that gave it enough difference to enjoy as a product of its own, adding that its most resonant elements are those Morton created for the series, like Simon and the Americans, with no basis in the French show. NME's Andrew Trendell agreed, saying it kept the tone of Call My Agent! and added "a little more heart and piercing British humour".

Roslyn Sulcas of The New York Times noted that the first episode followed the French series beat-for-beat but, after the set-up, "the show's plotlines gradually begin to differ, and to cater more closely to the specific preoccupations of the British cultural industry".
