= Joo Hyun-young =

South Korean actress (born 1996)

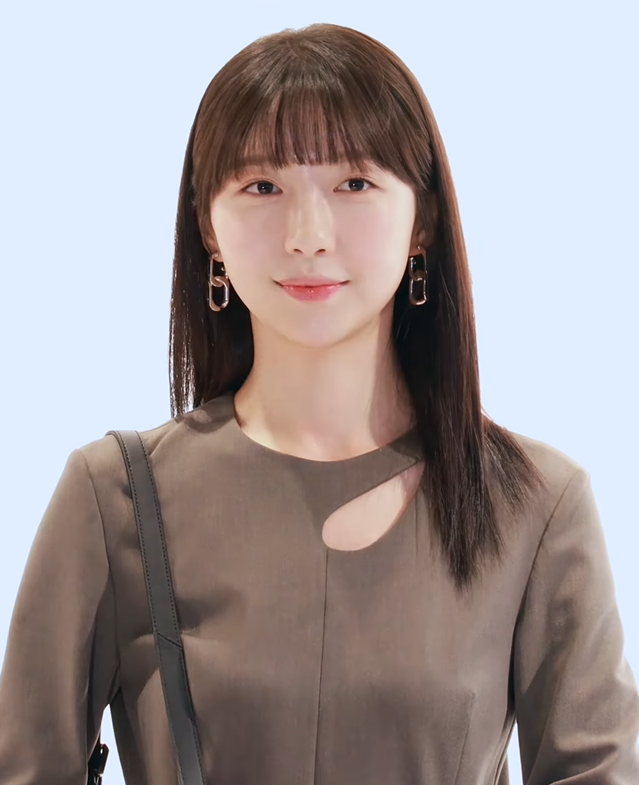
- Joo in September 2023
- Born: Kim Hyun-young; January 14, 1996 (age 30); Paju, South Korea
- Education: Kookmin University
- Occupations: Actress; television personality
- Years active: 2019–present
- Agent: AIMC

Korean name
- Hangul: 김현영
- RR: Gim Hyeonyeong
- MR: Kim Hyŏnyŏng

Stage name
- Hangul: 주현영
- RR: Ju Hyeonyeong
- MR: Chu Hyŏnyŏng
- Website: Official website

Kim Hyun-young (Korean: 김현영; born January 14, 1996) better known by her stage name Joo Hyun-young (Korean: 주현영), is a South Korean actress. She gained recognition for her appearances in comedy-variety show SNL Korea in 2021 and television series Extraordinary Attorney Woo in 2022.

== Philanthropy ==
On February 12, 2023, Joo donated 30 million won to help in the 2023 Turkey–Syria earthquake through Hope Bridge National Disaster Relief Association.

== Filmography ==
=== Film ===
Year	Title	Role	Notes	Ref.
2022	Aka 5jo		Short film	
2025	Ghost Train	Da-kyung		
2025	Pretty Crazy	Jeong Ah-ra		

=== Television series ===
Key
†	Denotes television productions that have not yet been released

Year	Title	Role	Notes	Ref.
2022	Extraordinary Attorney Woo	Dong Geu-ra-mi		
2022	Behind Every Star	So Hyun-joo		
2023	Dr. Romantic 3	interviewee	Cameo (episode 2)	
2023	The Kidnapping Day	computer repairwoman	Cameo (episode 10)	
2023–2024	The Story of Park's Marriage Contract	Sa-wol		
2024	Wedding Impossible	Hong Na-ri	Cameo (episode 1)	
2025	Ms. Incognito	Baek Hye-ji		
2026–2027	Nine to Six †	Shin Ji-won		

=== Web series ===
Year	Title	Role	Notes	Ref.
2019–2021	Best Mistake	Ahn Yu-na	Season 1–3	
2022	Returning Student: Grade A, but Love is F	Hyun-young		

=== Television show ===
Year	Title	Role	Ref.
2023	Earth Magic Bull World Travel	Guide	

=== Web show ===
Year	Title	Role	Notes	Ref.
2021–2023	SNL Korea Reboot	Cast member	Season 1–4	

== Accolades ==
=== Awards and nominations ===
Name of the award ceremony, year presented, category, nominee of the award, and the result of the nomination
Award ceremony	Year	Category	Nominee / Work	Result	Ref.
Baeksang Arts Awards	2022	Best Female Variety Performer	SNL Korea Reboot	Won	
Baeksang Arts Awards	2023	Best Female Variety Performer	SNL Korea Reboot	Nominated	
Baeksang Arts Awards	2023	Best New Actress – Television	Extraordinary Attorney Woo	Nominated	
Blue Dragon Series Awards	2022	Best New Female Entertainer	SNL Korea Reboot	Won	
Blue Dragon Series Awards	2023	Best Female Entertainer	SNL Korea Reboot	Won	
Blue Dragon Series Awards	2024	Best Female Entertainer	Crime Scene Returns	Nominated	
Brand of the Year Awards	2022	Hot Icon	Joo Hyun-young	Won	
MBC Drama Awards	2023	Best New Actress	The Story of Park's Marriage Contract	Won (Note: Tied with Park Jung-yeon)	

=== State honors ===
Name of country, year given, and name of honor
Country	Ceremony	Year	Honor or Award	Ref.
South Korea	Korean Popular Culture and Arts Awards (Note: Honors are given at the Korean Popular Culture and Arts Awards, arranged by the Korea Creative Content Agency and hosted by the Ministry of Culture, Sports and Tourism. They are awarded to those who have contributed to the arts and South Korea's pop culture.)	2023	Minister of Culture, Sports and Tourism Commendation	
South Korea	Newsis K-Expo Cultural Awards (Note: Established in 2019 and co-sponsored by Korea's Ministry of Culture, Sports and Tourism, Ministry of Foreign Affairs, Korea Creative Content Agency, Seoul Metropolitan Council and the Seoul Tourism Organization, it awards cultural icons, businesses, and individuals who have contributed greatly to Hallyu, the Korean wave.)	2023	Seoul Council Chairman's Award	

=== Listicles ===
Name of publisher, year listed, name of listicle, and placement
Publisher	Year	Listicle	Placement	Ref.
Cine21	2021	New Actress to watch out for in 2022	6th (Note: Tied with Go Min-si, Park Eun-bin, Keum Sae-rok, Moon Ga-young, Park Gyu-young, Lee Soo-kyung, Roh Yoon-seo, Gong Seung-yeon, Lee Se-young, IU, Keum Sae-rok, Park Ji-hu, Han So-hee, Jung Ji-so, Bang Min-ah, Jeon Jong-seo, Roh Jeong-eui)	
