= The Talent Agency =

Indonesian comedy-drama streaming television series

- Indonesian: Hubungi Agen Gue!
- Genre: Comedy-drama
- Created by: Mira Lesmana; Riri Riza
- Based on: Call My Agent! by Fanny Herrero
- Written by: Prima Rusdi; Tumpal Tampubolon; Titien Wattimena
- Directed by: Teddy Soeriaatmadja
- Starring: Lydia Kandou; Donny Damara; Hannah Al Rashid; Yoga Pratama
- Composers: Andre Harihandoyo; Rahadian Winursito
- Country of origin: Indonesia
- Original language: Indonesian
- No. of seasons: 1
- No. of episodes: 6

Production
- Executive producers: Mira Lesmana; Riri Riza; Winnie Lau; Michael Hogan; John Penotti; Charlie Corwin
- Cinematography: Vera Lestafa
- Editors: Aline Jusria; Kelvin Nugroho; Robby Barus
- Running time: 38–46 minutes
- Production companies: Miles Films; SK Global Entertainment

Original release
- Network: Disney+ Hotstar
- Release: 29 July – 2 September 2023

The Talent Agency (Indonesian: Hubungi Agen Gue!; lit. Call My Agent!) is an Indonesian comedy-drama television series, based on the French television series Call My Agent!. It premiered on Disney+ Hotstar on 29 July 2023. The series stars Lydia Kandou, Donny Damara, Hannah Al Rashid, and Yoga Pratama.

== Overview ==
The series follows the lives of four talent agents who jointly manage a fictional talent agency (ASA+, Indonesian: Agensi Surya Adhiwangsa), following the death of its head. As the agents navigate through various crises while managing their clients, they also engage in internal power struggles and rivalries. The series also follows the personal lives of the agents, revealing how the demands of their high-pressure jobs often impact and disrupt their own well-being.

== Cast and characters ==
=== Main ===
- Lydia Kandou as the fictionalized version of herself, a senior talent agent who is a former actor
- Donny Damara as Ricky, partner and agent
- Hannah Al Rashid as Amel, partner and agent
- Yoga Pratama as Yudhis, partner and agent
- Sheryl Sheinafia as Kamila, Amel's assistant
- Chicco Kurniawan as Puput, Yudhis's assistant
- Agni Pratistha as Nia, Ricky's assistant
- Dea Panendra as Salma, receptionist and aspiring actor

=== Recurring ===
- Willem Bevers as Surya Adhiwangsa, the head and founder of ASA+
- Happy Salma as Ghea, Surya's wife
- Izabel Jahja as Citra, client and Nadh's mother
- Marissa Anita as Cindy, Ricky's wife
- Zulfa Maharani as Nadh, Citra's daughter and Amel's client
- Samo Rafael as Bima, Amel's client and son of Ricky and Cindy
- Joseph Kara as Jonathan Tirta "JT", Surya's rival who tries to purchase ASA+'s stock

=== Guest ===
- Dian Sastrowardoyo as herself ("Bio")
- Lukman Sardi as himself ("Bio")
- Raihaanun as herself ("Bio")
- Rayya Makarim as herself ("Bio")

=== The actors ===
They appear as themselves, in most cases for a single episode.

Episode 1: Luna Maya
Episode 2: Pandji Pragiwaksono and Soleh Solihun
Episode 3: Bio One
Episode 4: Adhisty Zara and Kevin Ardilova
Episode 5: Tara Basro
Episode 6: Adipati Dolken

== Episodes ==
Series	Episodes	Originally released	
Series	Episodes	First released	Last released
1	6	29 July 2023	2 September 2023

No.	Title	Directed by	Written by	Original release date
1	"Luna"	Teddy Soeriaatmadja	Prima Rusdi	29 July 2023
At the talent agency ASA+, Yudhis plays the role of Luna Maya's talent agent. He is reluctant to inform Luna that she has been dropped from starring in a film directed by Quentin Tarantino due to being considered too old for the role. Kamila visits the office to meet with Ricky, and she is persuaded by Ricky to return to Semarang. While picking up her portfolio, she is recruited as Amel's assistant. Kamila accidentally leaks the real news to Luna. Feeling betrayed by her own agent, Luna threatens to leave ASA+ and join the rival talent agency, GEMA. However, Ricky manages to persuade Luna to stay and regain her role, on the condition of undergoing plastic surgery. Yet, Yudhis apologizes, and Luna bails out on the procedure. Due to her mistake, Kamila is fired but is given a second chance by Amel after stealing a script from Ricky. Later, ASA+ receives sad news when the owner, Surya Adhiwangsa, has a heart attack at the office before leaving for a vacation in the Maldives.
2	"Pandji and Soleh"	Teddy Soeriaatmadja	Tumpal Tampubolon	5 August 2023
Due to disputes stemming from their differing choices in the 2019 Indonesian presidential election, two clients of ASA+, Pandji Pragiwaksono and Soleh Solihun, are reluctant to appear in a single project, namely a public service advertisement initiated by the late Surya. Their respective agents, Ricky and Amel, persuade their clients to collaborate on the project. Ghea, Surya's wife, plans to sell ASA+ shares to their rival, Jonathan Tirta (JT). The agents brainstorm to prevent this from happening. Kamila meets Amel's young actor client, Bima, and they both show mutual interest. During an internal event commemorating the late Surya, Lydia gives a speech about the importance of Pandji and Soleh's presence in line with Surya's vision for ASA+. Both clients are eventually moved and agree to continue the project. However, a change in creative direction cancels Pandji and Soleh's involvement. During the same event, Kamila discovers that Bima is Ricky's son, leading her to limit their relationship.
3	"Bio"	Teddy Soeriaatmadja	Titien Wattimena	12 August 2023
Bio One, who serves as a brand ambassador for a hypermasculine energy drink, faces backlash from clients when a viral video of him wearing women's clothing circulates on the internet. His agent, Yudhis, agrees to create a clarification video to salvage the contract. However, Bio is unwilling to comply. Ghea, along with JT's representative, visit the ASA+ office, but the employees sabotage the meeting to create a negative impression. As a result, Ghea reduces the deadline for partner agents to match JT's offer. Kamila is invited by Ricky to attend the premiere of the film 27 Steps of May. She is offered the role as Raihaanun's assistant, but she declines. Ricky and Yudhis are invited to join GEMA with a higher salary and greater benefits. Salma secures a role and bypasses Yudhis' clients. Yudhis is impressed by Salma's acting in a theater performance and offers to become her agent. Bio uploads a clarification video explaining his intention to break gender boundaries, leading to the termination of the advertising contract.
4	"Zara and Kevin"	Teddy Soeriaatmadja	Titien Wattimena	19 August 2023
Two young actors, Adhisty Zara and Kevin Ardilova, clash while working together in a film. The dispute originates from a mistake by Kevin that results in their breakup. Their agents, Yudhis and Amel, step in to handle the disagreement. Salma auditions successfully for a minor role in the same production, but her scenes get cut, and she fails to involve. Amel presents a career plan for Nadh and plans to involve Nadh's mother, Citra, to invest in ASA+. Kevin apologizes to Zara, and shooting proceeds smoothly. Ricky receives a contract offer from GEMA, but Cindy opposes it. The plan gets revealed by Nia when she sees the transfer contract documents. JT abandons his intention to buy ASA+ shares upon learning Ricky is moving to GEMA and taking all his clients along. Ricky admits to canceling the contract with GEMA, but Lydia overhears on a phone call that Ricky is still interested in GEMA's offer.
5	"Tara"	Teddy Soeriaatmadja	Titien Wattimena	26 August 2023
After receiving hurtful comments about her physical appearance online, actor Tara Basro is experiencing a panic attack and is unable to continue filming. Her agent, Ricky, steps in to address the issue, with the assistance of breathing exercises guided by Ayu. Cindy and Ricky are planning to purchase ASA+ shares. However, Amel disagrees, objecting to Ricky's complete ownership. Amel secures a loan from Citra under the condition that Nadh becomes a star. Ghea informs that she has a potential new buyer, necessitating a swift decision. Salma withdraws from a film audition due to a script containing sexist undertones. Ayu suddenly falls ill, and Tara's still unstable condition prevents her from continuing to film an important scene, forcing a postponement. A day later, Tara experiences another panic attack and briefly leaves the location. Kamila steps in to assist Tara with breathing exercises. With Kamila's help, Tara manages to resume filming. Ricky celebrates Kamila's birthday in his office, and the unexpected presence of Cindy and Bima surprises them.
6	"Dodot"	Teddy Soeriaatmadja	Titien Wattimena	2 September 2023
After completing his exclusive contract, actor Adipati Dolken (Dodot) is presented with new projects, including a film directed by Mouly Surya. Meanwhile, Cindy discovers Kamila's true identity, and during their conversation, Kamila reveals that Ricky had previously been married to her mother. Upon learning this truth, Cindy becomes angry with Ricky and orders him to leave the house, refusing to provide the funds for the purchase of ASA+ shares. Dodot is subsequently arrested by the police on charges of drug possession, and as his agent, Yudhis seeks ways to prevent the news from spreading widely in the media. Yudhis receives an offer from the Akar Randu production house, which is willing to help suppress the news, but in exchange, Dodot has to sign an exclusive contract with them. Amel visits Citra and Nadh's home to discuss the loan issue, but when Citra has not returned yet, Nadh makes an inappropriate advance towards Amel. Startled, Amel accidentally pushes Nadh, causing Nadh to become angry and demand that Amel leave. Dodot refuses to sign a contract with Akar Randu and feels responsible for the situation. Ghea's new offer is withdrawn after hearing about Dodot's case. Meanwhile, Citra and Nadh announce that they will file a lawsuit against Amel and ASA+.

== Production ==
In January 2022, Variety exclusively announced upcoming television series adaptations of the French show Call My Agent!, including an Indonesian adaptation set to be produced by Disney+ Hotstar. In November 2022, the project was announced during the Disney Content Showcase in Singapore. On 6 December 2022, production house Miles Films, in collaboration with SK Global Entertainment, announced the production of the adaptation titled The Talent Agency along with a poster featuring the four main cast members: Lydia Kandou, Donny Damara, Yoga Pratama, and Hannah Al Rashid. Showrunner Mira Lesmana revealed that the adaptation plans were initiated by SK Global Entertainment in 2020. The premiere date was announced on 7 July 2023, preceded by the delivery of flower arrangements to the actors and crew members involved in the production.

The principal photography for the first season had started in September 2022.

== Accolades ==
The series was nominated for Series of the Year at the 2023 Jakarta Film Week.
