= Call My Agent: Bollywood =

Indian drama series

- Genre: Comedy drama
- Based on: Call My Agent!
- Written by: Hussain Dalal; Abbas Dalal
- Screenplay by: Hussain Dalal; Abbas Dalal
- Directed by: Shaad Ali
- Starring: Rajat Kapoor; Aahana Kumra; Ayush Mehra; Soni Razdan; Suchitra Pillai; Priyasha Bhardwaj
- Composers: Pranaay; Roy
- Country of origin: India
- Original language: Hindi
- No. of seasons: 1
- No. of episodes: 6

Production
- Executive producers: Sohail Abbas; Praver Awal; Mrinalini Jain; Prasoon Garg; Pooja Batura Pathak
- Producers: Sameer Nair; Rishi Negi; Deepak Segal
- Cinematography: Sunita Radia
- Editor: Farooq Hundekar
- Production companies: Applause Entertainment; Banijay Asia

Original release
- Network: Netflix
- Release: 29 October 2021

Call My Agent: Bollywood is an Indian comedy drama television series based on the France 2 series Call My Agent!. The Netflix show is directed by Shaad Ali, written by Hussain Dalal and Abbas Dalal.

== Cast ==
=== Main ===
- Aahana Kumra as Amal
- Ayush Mehra as Mehershad
- Rajat Kapoor as Monty
- Soni Razdan as Treasa
- Radhika Seth as Nia

=== Recurring ===
- Tinnu Anand as Soumyajit Dasgupta
- Priyasha Bhardwaj as Sonia
- Rohan Joshi as Jignesh
- Merenla Imsong as Nancy
- Anuschka Sawhney as Jasleen
- Suchitra Pillai as Suchitra
- Raghav Lekhi as Sid
- Aban Deohans as Stuti
- Ujjwal Gauraha as Assistant Director

=== Special appearances ===
- Dia Mirza as herself
- Ali Fazal as himself
- Richa Chadda as herself
- Lara Dutta as herself
- Sarika as herself
- Akshara Haasan as herself
- Lillete Dubey as herself
- Ila Arun as herself
- Farah Khan as herself
- Tigmanshu Dhulia as himself
- Jackie Shroff as himself
- Nandita Das as herself
- Sameer Saxena as himself
- Hussain Dalal as himself

== Episodes ==
=== Season 1 (2021) ===
Story	Episode	Title	Original release date	Guest(s)
1	1	"Episode 1"	29 October 2021	Dia Mirza
2	2	"Episode 2"	29 October 2021	Lillete Dubey, Tigmanshu Dhulia and Ila Arun
3	3	"Episode 3"	29 October 2021	Sarika, Akshara Haasan and Farah Khan
4	4	"Episode 4"	29 October 2021	Lara Dutta
5	5	"Episode 5"	29 October 2021	Richa Chadha, Ali Fazal
6	6	"Episode 6"	29 October 2021	Nandita Das, Jackie Shroff

== Reception ==
According to a review of Scroll.in by Nandini Ramnath entitled "...Just say 'non'", calling it "...the vapid and barely funny Hindi remake" and referring to "... the ART talent company in Mumbai." Ramnath pointed out that the "...company is located in the southern end of the city, far away from the northern suburbs where much of Hindi cinema is created. It's the first sign of just how delinked the remake is from reality". A review by Cinema Express by Shilajit Mitra entitled "...An amateurish series that puts fun on hold", secondly entitled "Four talent agents bug their clients — and us — in this Netflix series". Opening with "Netflix India has been banging away at a genre it thinks is ultra lucrative: the film industry comedy. It's a tough sell" and concluding "These agents need critics... someone to tell them they aren't any good". As noted by Pinkvilla review by Radhika Seth; "Waited for this moment for so many years", her performance lauded by fans. According to a Dmtalkies review by Anoushka Sinha; "While the star-studded episodes manage to pique the audience's interest in the show, it fails to make them deeply connect with the agents who are core to the storyline. Except for a few cliché comments on how "ruthless this industry gets" or the minimal attention given to the lives of struggling actors, the series misses out on most things that the audience would like to know about Bollywood."
