= Fanny Herrero =

French actress and screenwriter

Fanny Herrero (born 5 December 1974) is a French television screenwriter from Toulon, France. In the English-speaking world she is best known as the creator of the Netflix-distributed series Call My Agent.

== Early life ==
Herrero is the daughter of rugby player and coach Daniel Herrero and grew up in the Toulon region of southern France.

After completing the French khâgne program, she attended the Paris Institute of Political Studies, graduating in 1998 with a degree in communication and human resources. She also attended the London School of Economics and was a member of the French junior volleyball team.

== Professional career ==
Herrero was a theater actor from 2000 to 2006 before turning to screenwriting. Her first screenplay, the TV film Fort comme un homme, was broadcast on Arte. In 2007 she co-founded SAS, a collective of screenwriters who worked on series such as A French Village, Kaboul Kitchen, and Fais pas ci, fais pas ça.

In 2014, she took over a previously abandoned Canal+ project created by Dominique Besnehard and Nicolas Mercier and developed it into Call My Agent (French: Dix pour cent), which aired on France 2. The series was picked up by Netflix in 2015 and gained an international audience. Herrero acted as showrunner for the first three seasons, winning the Crystal Globe Award for best television series in 2018 and 2019.

In 2022 she went on to write the miniseries Standing Up (French: Drôle) for Netflix. She also served as president of the jury at the 2022 Canneseries.
