= List of Soviet films of 1963 =

A list of films produced in the Soviet Union in 1963 (see 1963 in film).

== 1963 ==
Title	Russian title	Director	Cast	Genre	Notes
1963
3+2	Три плюс два	Genrikh Oganisyan	Natalya Kustinskaya, Natalya Fateyeva, Andrei Mironov, Evgeny Zharikov	Comedy	
All remains to people	Всё остаётся людям	Georgy Natanson	Nikolai Cherkasov, Sophia Pilyavskaya, Andrei Popov, Elina Bystritskaya, Igor Ozerov	Drama	
Blood Ties	Родная кровь	Mikhail Yershov	Yevgeny Matveev	Drama	
The Blue Notebook	Синяя тетрадь	Lev Kulidzhanov	Mikhail Kuznetsov	Drama	
Come Tomorrow, Please...	Приходите завтра...	Yevgeny Tashkov	Yekaterina Savinova, Anatoli Papanov	Comedy, drama	
The First Trolleybus	Первый троллейбус	Isidor Annensky	Irina Gubanova	Romance	
Introduction to Life	Вступление	Igor Talankin	Boris Tokarev	Drama	Winner of the Special Jury Prize at the 24th Venice International Film Festival
I stroll through Moscow	Я шагаю по Москве	Georgi Daneliya	Aleksei Loktev, Nikita Mikhalkov, Galina Polskikh, Evgeniy Steblov	Comedy	
It Happened at the Police Station	Это случилось в милиции	Villen Azarov	Vsevolod Sanaev	Drama	
Cain XVIII	Каин XVIII	Nadezhda Kosheverova and Mikhail Shapiro	Erast Garin, Lidiya Sukharevskaya, Mikhail Zharov	Fantasy, comedy	
An Optimistic Tragedy	Оптимистическая трагедия	Samson Samsonov	Margarita Volodina, Boris Andreyev, Vyacheslav Tikhonov	Drama	
Meet Baluyev!	Знакомьтесь, Балуев	Victor Komissarjevski	Ivan Pereverzev, Nina Urgant	Drama	Entered into the 3rd Moscow International Film Festival
Road to the Stage	Путь на арену	Henrik Malyan, Levon Isahakyan	Leonid Yengibarov, Izabella Danzas, Hayk Danzas, Varduhi Varderesyan, Karp Khachvankyan	Comedy	
The Serf Actress	Крепостная актриса	Roman Tikhomirov	Tamara Syomina	Musical	
Silence	Тишина	Vladimir Basov	Vitali Konyayev, Georgy Martyniuk, Larisa Luzhina	Drama	Prize winner of the All-Union Film Festival
The Slowest Train	Самый медленный поезд	Vladimir Krasnopolsky and Valeriy Uskov	Pavel Kadochnikov	Drama	
Summer Is Over	Пропало лето	Nikita Orlov, Rolan Bykov	Vladimir Yevstafyev	Comedy	
Queen of the Gas Station	Королева бензоколонки	Oleksiy Mishurin, Nikolai Litus	Nadezhda Rumyantseva, Andrei Sova, Alexei Kozhevnikov, Yuri Belov	Comedy	
They Conquer the Skies	Им покоряется небо	Tatyana Lioznova	Nikolay Rybnikov	Drama	
Whistle Stop	Полустанок	Boris Barnet	Vasiliy Merkurev	Comedy	
