= Moscow Rock Laboratory =

Rock music club in Moscow, Russia

The Moscow Rock Laboratory (Russian: Московская рок-лаборатория, romanized: Moskovskaya rok-laboratoriya; 1986–1992) was an officially sanctioned rock club in Moscow that promoted and controlled the activities of Soviet rock musicians who did not belong to state concert organizations.

== History ==
The Moscow Rock Laboratory was established on October 23, 1985. The laboratory's headquarters were in the Unified Scientific and Methodological Center of the Main Department of Culture of the Executive Committee of the Moscow City Council (Russian: Единый научно-методический центр Главного управления культуры исполкома Моссовета). The club was founded by order of Viktor Grishin, then the First Secretary of the Moscow party committee of the CPSU. The Rock Laboratory was set up with the help and support of the local Komsomol.

The Moscow Rock Laboratory's first director was Bulat Musurmankulov. Olga Opryatnaya was the laboratory's second director. Artemy Troitsky was elected to the governing board of the Rock Club. The artistic council, which was responsible for accepting new groups into the laboratory, also included Pyotr Mamonov, Aleksandr Lipnitsky, and Vasily Shumov.

The Moscow Rock Laboratory closed in 1992. The services the rock laboratory provided to musicians had become less essential and more difficult to maintain due to the political and economic changes of the late 1980s and early 1990s.

In 2015, a concert to celebrate the 30th anniversary of the founding of the Moscow Rock Laboratory was held at Yotaspace in Moscow.

== Activities ==
The Moscow Rock Laboratory provided non-professional rock musicians a place to rehearse, give concerts, and record albums, under the supervision of the authorities. The laboratory provided sound and light equipment and amplifiers, organized shows, and handled publicity for its members. Since Moscow Rock Laboratory bands were officially considered "amateurs", they were not paid for their concerts.

Aleksandr Ageev's recording studio, Kolokol (Russian: Колокол), operated from the Moscow Rock Laboratory until the laboratory's closure in 1992.

The first Rock Lab Festival took place in January 1986 in the hall of a House Of Culture. Performers at the festival included Bravo (Russian: «Браво»), Centre (Russian: «Центр»), Zvuki Mu (Russian: «Звуки Му»), Nikolai Kopernik (Russian: «Николай Коперник»), and Nochnoy Prospekt (Russian: «Ночной проспект», lit. 'Night Avenue'). The laboratory regularly held festival called the Festival of Hopes (Russian: Фестиваль надежд).

Groups from other cities performed in Moscow at the invitation of the rock laboratory.

The Cheryomukha-92 (Russian: «Черёмуха-92») festival was the last event organized by the Moscow Rock Laboratory before its closure.

== Members ==
The laboratory held regular auditions for new groups. The artistic council would listen to 10–12 groups and select four or five to become members.

As of 1987, about 100 bands were members of the Moscow Rock Laboratory. The members of the rock laboratory included Brigada S (Russian: «Бригада С»), Krematoriy (Russian: «Крематорий»), Bravo (Russian: «Браво»), Centre (Russian: «Центр»), Alyans (Russian: «Альянс»), Nochnoy Prospekt (Russian: «Ночной проспект»), Vyezhlivy Otkaz (Russian: «Вежливый отказ», lit. 'Polite Refusal'), Chorny Obelisk (Russian: «Чёрный обелиск», lit. 'Black Obelisk'), Korroziya Metalla (Russian: «Коррозия металла», lit. 'Metal Corrosion'), and Chudo-Yudo (Russian: «Чудо-юдо»).

== See also ==
- Leningrad Rock Club
