= Artemy Troitsky =

Russian journalist, music critic and academic (born 1955)

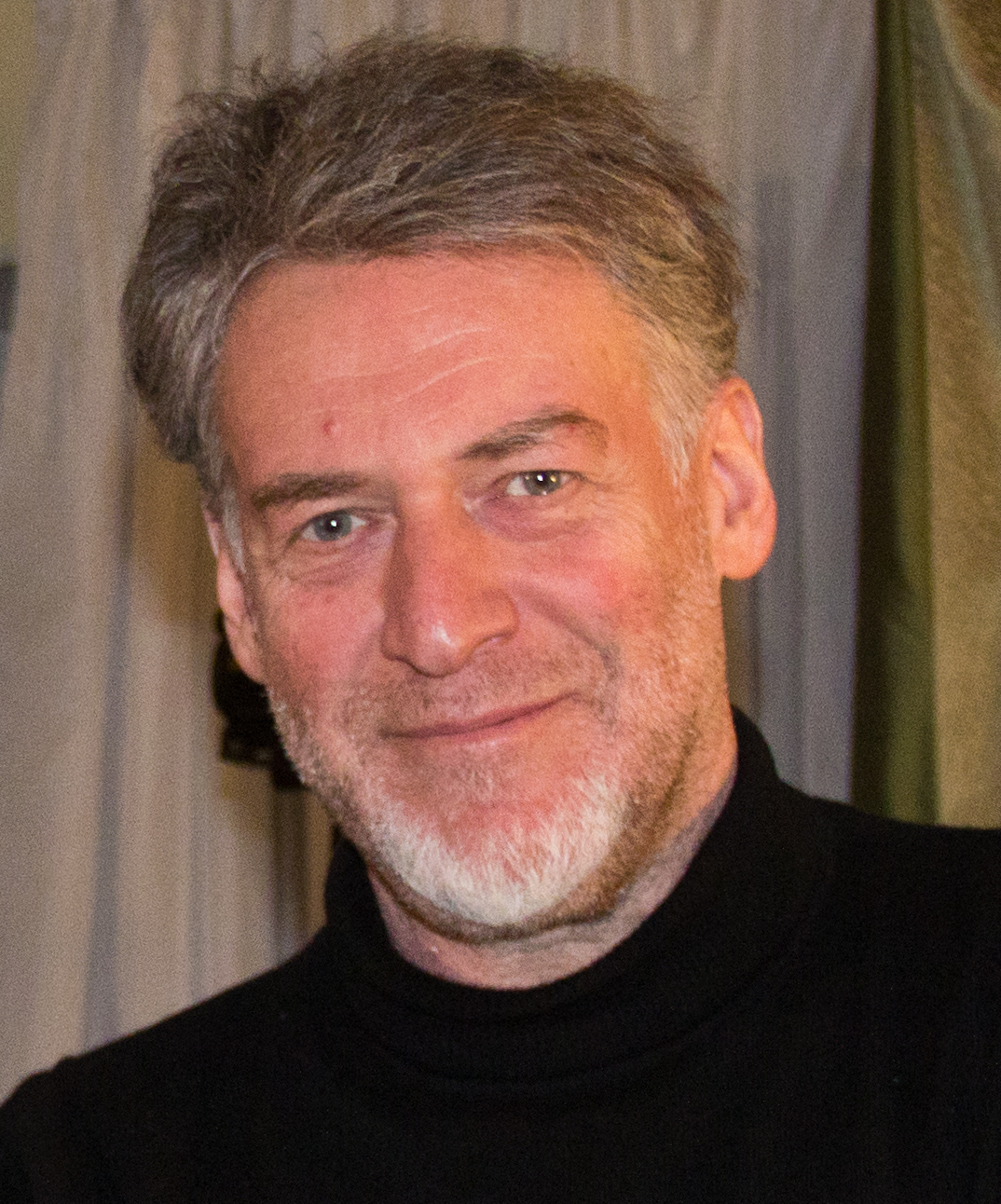
- 2013
- Born: Artemy Kivovich Maidanik; June 16, 1955 (age 71); Yaroslavl, Russian SFSR, USSR
- Education: Moscow State University of Economics, Statistics, and Informatics (1977)
- Occupations: Music critic; journalist; radio host; concert promoter; TV host; academic
- Years active: 1967–present
- Spouse: Vera Marchenkova
- Children: Alexandra (1998), Ivan (2002), Lidiya (2010)
- Relatives: Kiva Maidanik (father)
- Awards: Medal "Defender of a Free Russia"
- Artemy Troitsky's voice Troitsky on the Echo of Moscow program, 29 March 2007

Artemy Kivovich Troitsky (né Maidanik; Russian: Артемий Кивович Троицкий né Майданик, born 16 June 1955 in Yaroslavl) is a Russian journalist, music critic, concert promoter, radio host, and academic who has lectured on music journalism at Moscow State University. In 1988, he was described in The New York Times as "the leading Soviet rock critic."

In 1986, Troitsky was one of the organizers of the "Account No. 904" rock concert, modeled on Live Aid, to raise funds for the victims of the Chernobyl disaster, the first such concert in the Soviet Union.

Currently, Troitsky is living in Tallinn, Estonia and works as a lecturer in Tallinn and Helsinki.

== Biography ==
Artemy Troitsky was born on June 16, 1955, in Yaroslavl, into the family of political scientist and Latin American historian Kiva Lvovich Maidanik (Russian: Кива Львович Майданик). His mother was Rufina Nikolaevna Troitskaya. He spent his childhood in Prague, where his parents worked as employees of the journal Problems of World and Socialism (Russian: «Проблемы мира и социализма»).

From 1972 to 1974, he led discos in the main building of Moscow State University, in the cafe B-4. In 1977, he graduated from the Moscow Institute of Economics and Statistics with a degree in mathematics and economics. From 1978 to 1983, he worked as a junior research fellow at the Institute of Art History. He was fired before he had time to defend his Ph.D. From 1982 to 1983 he was the guitarist of Zvuki Mu. He was one of the founders of the label General Records.

Since 2001, he has been lecturing on the subjects “The History of the Entertainment Industry” and “The Music Press” at the faculty “Production and Management in Music Show Business” of the State University of Management.

From 2001 to 2014, he conducted a master class in music journalism at the journalism department of Moscow State University. In interviews, Troitsky noted that he was “squeezed out” of his job at Moscow State University after 13 years of teaching, and that his lectures were monitored and censored.

In 2003-2004, he was the chairman of the jury of the Sayan Ring International Festival of Ethnic Music in Shushenskoye (since 2012 the festival has been called WORLD of Siberia).

In 2011, the journalist was subjected to a surge of prosecutions for his public statements. There were seven lawsuits in total. The plaintiffs in the criminal proceedings were former policeman Nikolay Khovansky and musician Vаdim Samoylov. A benefit concert was organized in support of Troitsky and held at the Moscow club Hleb in June 2011. The performers at the concert included Yuri Shevchuk, Oleg Nesterov, Nick Rock'n'Roll, Vasya Oblomov, Vladimir Ratskevich, Vasily Shumov and Center, Pakhom and Vivisektor, ElgreE, RE-pac, OtZvuki Mu, Barto, Shtabelya, Posledny Shans, Nebesnaya Kantselyariya, and Doch Monroe i Kennedy. In September, the album For Troitsky was also released with 23 tracks from 23 musicians and bands. In December 2011, the criminal article under which Troitsky was sued was decriminalized, and the relevant lawsuits were discontinued. "The regime in Moscow has understood that music plays a revolutionary role," Troitsky says in an interview with journalist Tigran Petrosyan

Since mid-September 2014 he has lived in Tallinn, Estonia, where he is engaged in teaching activities. He also teaches in Finland and London and lectures in many other places, such as in the United States for various institutions of higher education.

In 2018, the two-hour documentary film The Critic (Russian: Критик), directed by Andrey Ayrapetov, premiered at the Beat Film Festival in Moscow. The film focuses on Troitsky's early years and his activity in the rock community in the 1980s.

In February 2022, he opposed Russia's invasion of Ukraine. On January 14, 2023, according to the decision of the Ministry of Justice, he was recognized as a foreign agent.

== Books ==
Back in the USSR: The True Story of Rock in Russia. London and Boston: Faber & Faber, 1988.

Reviewed by Richard Stites in Slavic Review 48:2 (1989): 308; by Alex Raksin in the Los Angeles Times, Nov. 27, 1988.

Tusovka: Who's Who in the New Soviet Rock Culture. London: Omnibus, 1990.

Translated into Italian by Vincenzo Perna as Tusovka. Rock e stili nella nuova cultura sovietica. Turin: 1990.

Subkultura: Stories of Youth and Resistance in Russia, 1815-2017. New Social: 2017.

== Selected filmography ==
- Down House (2001)
- Paul McCartney in Red Square (2003)
- Gloss (2007)
