= Time for Rest from Saturday to Monday =

- Polish poster
- Directed by: Igor Talankin
- Written by: Igor Talankin
- Produced by: Yefim Golynsky
- Starring: Alla Demidova; Vladislav Strzhelchik; Aleksey Batalov
- Cinematography: Georgy Rerberg; Pavel Lebeshev
- Music by: Vasily Shumov; Aleksey Loktev
- Production company: Mosfilm
- Release date: 26 November 1984
- Running time: 90 minutes
- Country: Soviet Union
- Language: Russian

Time for Rest from Saturday to Monday (Russian: Время отдыха с субботы до понедельника, romanized: Vremya otdykha s subboty do ponedelnika) is a 1984 romantic drama directed by Igor Talankin and based on the story of Yuri Nagibin Patience with the music group Center, whose members also stars in the film.

== Plot ==
A married couple with two grown children goes on a cruise ship Dmitry Furmanov Leningrad—Valaam—Leningrad. During a tour of the island of Valaam.

During a tour of the island of Valaam wife quarrel and Anna goes to a former monastery, where persons with disabilities live. In one of them, a legless boatman, to his own surprise, Anna recognizes Pavel from her youth, whom she thought she loved all her life, waiting for a meeting with him, as they suddenly broke up during the Great Patriotic War. But it is not happy meeting and Anna returns to her husband on the boat.

== Cast ==
- Alla Demidova as Anna
- Vladislav Strzhelchik as Aleksey
- Aleksey Batalov as Pavel
- Darya Mikhailova as Tanya
- Mikhail Neganov as Pasha
- Nina Urgant as ship passengers
- Yegor Vysotsky as Bearded
- Igor Kashintsev as quizmaster-joker

== See also ==
- Private Life (1982 film)
