= The House of the Sun (film) =

2010 film by Garik Sukachov

- Russian: Дом Cолнца
- Directed by: Garik Sukachov
- Release date: 2010
- Country: Russia

The House of the Sun (Russian: Дом Cолнца, romanized: Dom Solntsa) is a 2010 Russian movie about hippies in the Soviet Union. The director is a rock musician Garik Sukachov.

== Plot ==
The USSR in the early 1970s. Sasha, Daughter of CPSU dignitary, after a successful high school graduation passes her exams at a medical institute and accidentally meets a girl called Gerda along with her hippie friends. She soon falls in love with the leader of their community nicknamed Sun. Her new friends are a blacksmith nicknamed Maloy, a Chilean revolutionary Juan, a long-haired man nicknamed Skeleton, and a talented artist called Korean.

Sasha's father, as a reward for entering the institute, gives Sasha a ticket to a holiday in Bulgaria, but Sasha stops the bus on its way to the airport. Her and the company of new friends take a train to Crimea. Sasha learns to drink wine from the bottle and suffers from the alienation of Sun, who's constantly absent. In Crimea, hippies stop in a rented house, go to improvised discos and dance to rock music, which is broadcast on the pirate radio by a mysterious "Trouble Woman" (as it turns out, the daughter of the chief in the local militsiya). The hippies, as well as the Korean, are being watched by a KGB officer, who was sent from Moscow; as a result, the Korean gets arrested at the bus station when he buys the ticket to return to Moscow.

After a brawl with demobilized border guards hippies get to the militsiya. To rescue them, Sun first goes to his father, a Soviet Admiral. Here it turns out that Sun is terminally ill and needs urgent treatment in Moscow. Then he turns to the "Trouble Woman", who gives him the money to bribe her mother — militsiya officer. After the release of the hippies, on the beach by the bonfires the party begins. Meanwhile, Sun burns his cabin ("house of the sun"), which he showed only to Sasha.

== Cast ==
- Svetlana Ivanova as Sasha
- Stanislav Ryadinsky as Sun
- Darya Moroz as Gerda
- Ivan Stebunov as Pavel Kochetkov
- Oleksiy Gorbunov as Boris Pavlovich Kapelsky
- Mikhail Yefremov as Professor Victor Nemchinov
- Mikhail Gorevoy as KGB officer
- Ivan Okhlobystin as lecturer
- Chulpan Khamatova as Galina
- Garik Sukachov as Vladimir Vysotsky
- Evdokiya Germanova as head of the tourist group
- Nina Ruslanova as grandmother Olya
- Alexander F. Sklyar as cameo
