= Boris Tokarev =

Boris Tokarev may refer to:

- Boris Tokarev (athlete) (1927–2002), Russian athlete
- Boris Tokarev (actor) (born 1947), Russian actor
