= Baluev =

Baluev or Baluyev (Russian: Балуев, from баловать meaning to pumper) is a Russian masculine surname, its feminine counterpart is Balueva or Baluyeva. It may refer to

- Aleksandr Baluev (born 1958), Russian actor
- Pyotr Baluyev (1857–1923), general in the Imperial Russian Army

== See also ==
- Meet Baluyev!, a 1963 Soviet drama film
