= The Voice Senior (Russian TV series) season 3 =

The Voice Senior
- Season 3
- Presented by: Dmitry Nagiev
- Coaches: Lev Leshchenko; Tamara Gverdtsiteli; Elena Vaenga; Garik Sukachov
- Winner: Dina Yudina
- Winning coach: Tamara Gverdtsiteli
- Runner-up: Petr Tarenkov

Release
- Original network: Channel One
- Original release: September 4 – October 2, 2020

Season chronology
- ← Previous; Season 2

The third season of the Russian reality talent show The Voice Senior (The Voice. 60+) premiered on September 4, 2020 on Channel One. Lev Leshchenko returned as coach, while Tamara Gverdtsiteli, Elena Vaenga, and Garik Sukachov replaced Pelageya, Valeriya, and Mikhail Boyarsky, respectively. Dmitry Nagiev returned as the show's presenter.

Dina Yudina was announced the winner on October 2, 2020, marking Tamara Gverdtsiteli's first win as a coach and the second female coach to win in the show's history, behind Pelageya. With Dina's win, Tamara Gverdtsiteli became the first new coach to win. Also, Dina became only the 2nd winner in the show’s history to have been just a one-chair turn in the blind auditions.

As in season 1, the audience again chose the Best Coach. It was Lev Leshchenko with 31%. Last time in season 1, he took the last, 4th place.

== Coaches and presenter ==
The Voice Senior season 3 coaches and presenter

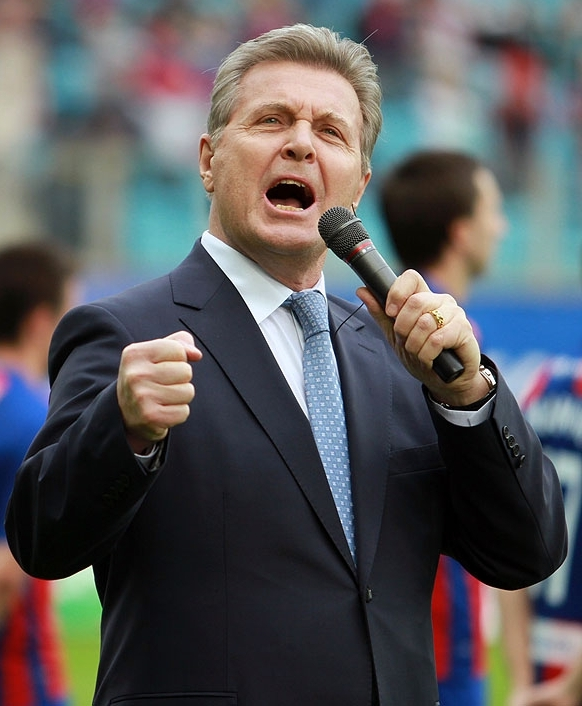
Lev Leshchenko

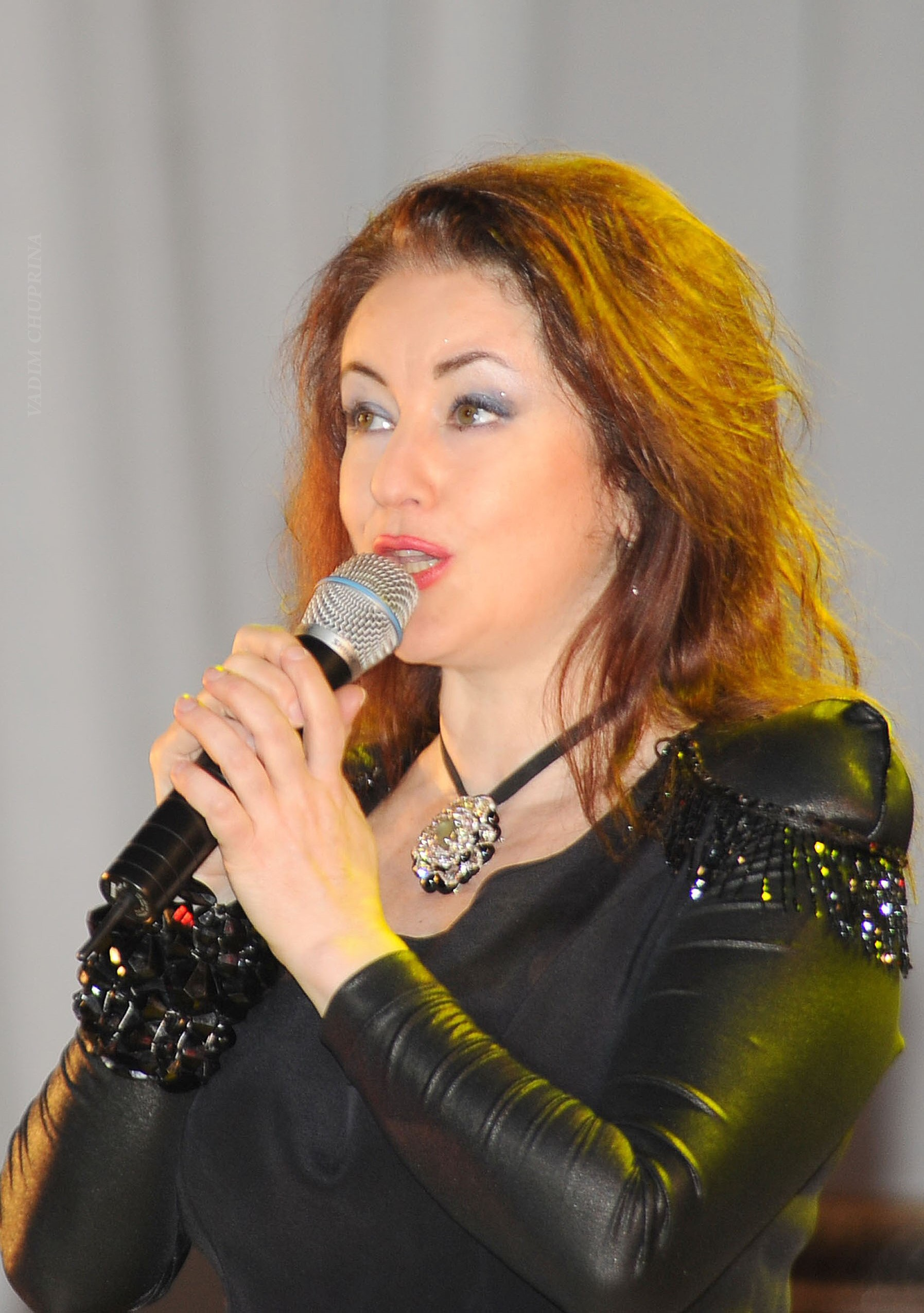
Tamara Gverdtsiteli

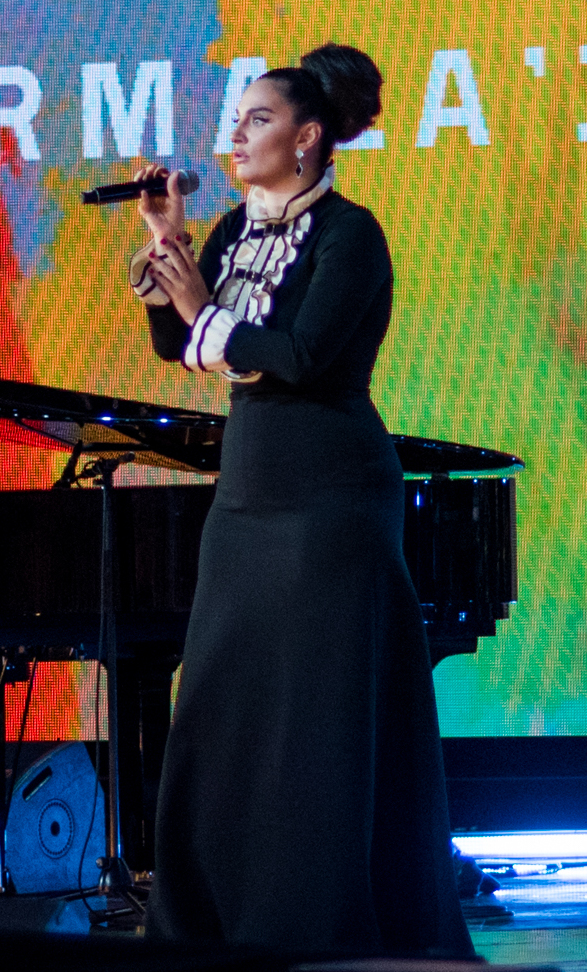
Elena Vaenga

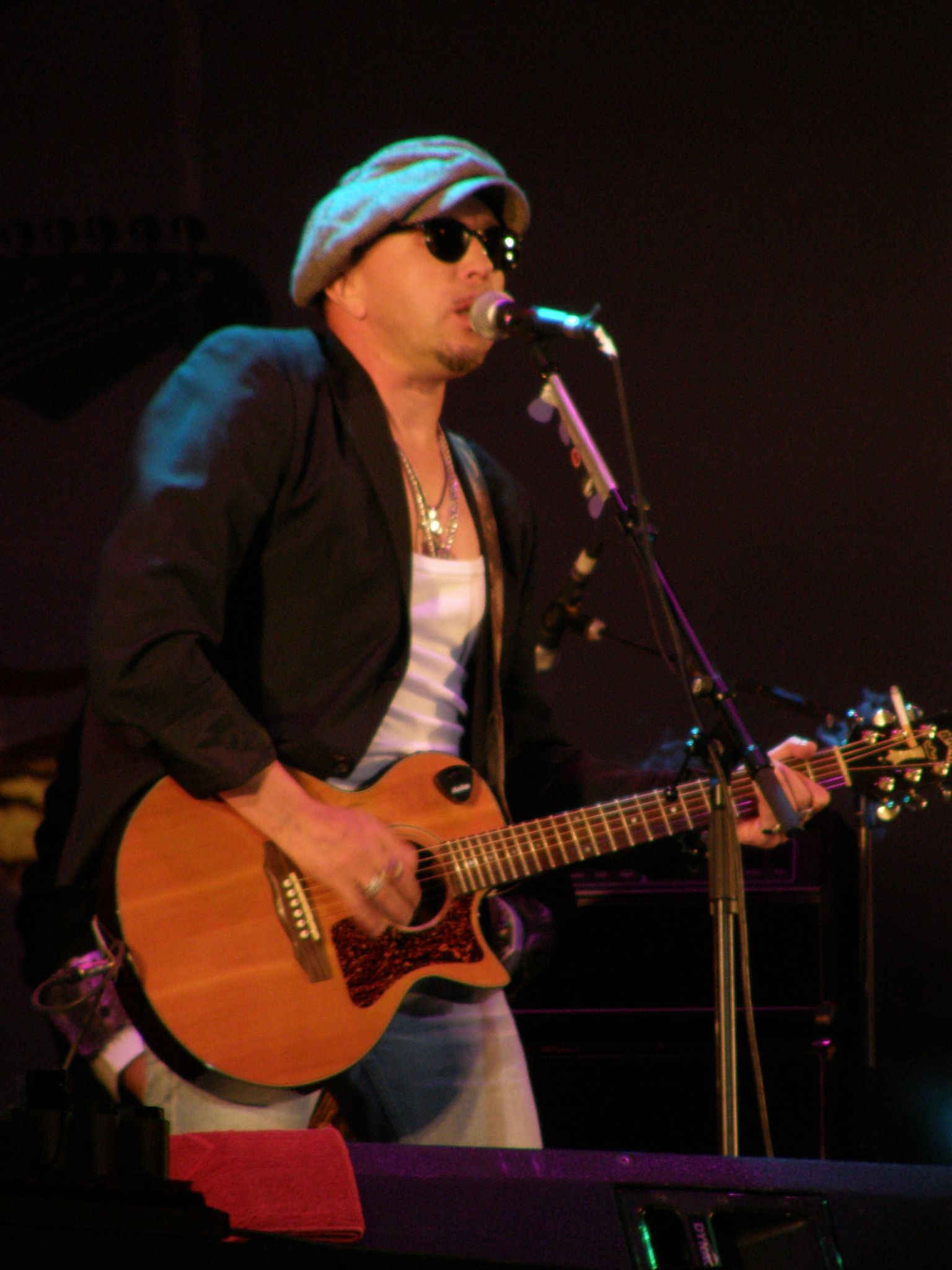
Garik Sukachov

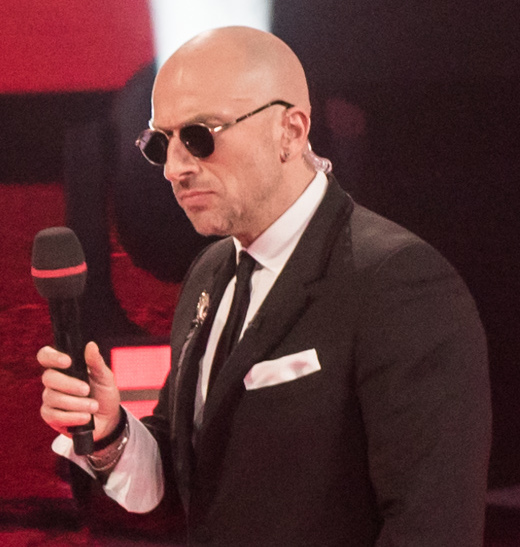
Dmitry Nagiev

Lev Leshchenko returned as coaches for his 3rd season in a row. Pelageya, Valeriya, and Boyarsky didn't return for season three and were replaced by Tamara Gverdtsiteli, Elena Vaenga, and Garik Sukachov, thus making it the second season (and the third season in the whole Russian version of The Voice franchise) to have two female coaches.

Dmitry Nagiev returned as a presenter.

== Teams ==
Colour key

- Winner
- Runner-up
- Third place
- Eliminated in the Final
- Eliminated in the Knockout rounds

Coaches	Top 20 artists				
Lev Leshchenko					
Lev Leshchenko	Petr Tarenkov	Valery Kucherenko	Nikolay Sakharov	Alla Ponomaryova	Valentin Buzovkin
Tamara Gverdtsiteli					
Tamara Gverdtsiteli	Dina Yudina	Vsevolod Ushakov	Andrey Papazyan	Alexander Chumak	Valery Agabekov
Elena Vaenga					
Elena Vaenga	Irina Anikina	Vyacheslav Olkhovsky	Igor Yatskov	Lyubov Ostretsova	Svetlana Goncharova
Garik Sukachov					
Garik Sukachov	Tatyana Shupenya	Galina Grozina	Irina Fedotova	Sergey Shikalov	Stefano Voice

== Blind auditions ==
Colour key

✔	Coach pressed "I WANT YOU" button
✔	Coach pressed "I WANT YOU" button, despite the lack of places in his/her team
	Artist defaulted to a coach's team
	Artist picked a coach's team
	Artist eliminated with no coach pressing their button

The coaches performed "Я милого узнаю по походке" at the start of the show.

Episode	Order	Artist	Age	Hometown	Song	Coach's and artist's choices			
Episode	Order	Artist	Age	Hometown	Song	Leshchenko	Gverdtsiteli	Vaenga	Sukachov
Episode 1 (Note: Lev Leshchenko is The Best Coach of episode 1.) (September 4, 2020)	1	Galina Grozina	73	Svobodny, Amur Oblast	«А за окном черёмуха»	✔	✔	✔	✔
Episode 1 (September 4, 2020)	2	Valentin Buzovkin	71	Yasnogorsk, Tula Oblast	«Caruso»	✔	—	—	—
Episode 1 (September 4, 2020)	3	Svetlana Trifonova	60	Nizhny Novgorod	«Не расстанусь с комсомолом»	—	—	—	—
Episode 1 (September 4, 2020)	4	Valery Agabekov	69	Krasnodar	«L-O-V-E»	✔	✔	—	—
Episode 1 (September 4, 2020)	5	Inna Badanina	74	Pavlovskiy Posad, Moscow Oblast	«Неаполитанская песенка»	—	—	—	—
Episode 1 (September 4, 2020)	6	Irina Anikina	61	Nizhny Novgorod Oblast	«Белая лебедь - подруга весны»	✔	—	✔	—
Episode 1 (September 4, 2020)	7	Vyacheslav Olkhovsky	64	Grozny	«Speak Softly Love»	✔	✔	✔	✔
Episode 1 (September 4, 2020)	8	Lyudmila Mozolyova	62	Monino, Moscow Oblast	«Листья жёлтые»	—	—	—	—
Episode 1 (September 4, 2020)	9	Andrey Papazyan	60	Gyumri, Armenia	«My Way»	—	✔	—	—
Episode 1 (September 4, 2020)	10	Alla Maksimova	69	Saint Petersburg	«Дружба»	—	—	—	—
Episode 2 (Note: Lev Leshchenko is The Best Coach of episode 2.) (September 11, 2020)	1	Sergey Shikalov	61	Ufa	«Blue Suede Shoes»	—	✔	—	✔
Episode 2 (September 11, 2020)	2	Dina Yudina	91	Saint-Petersburg	«Калитка»	—	✔	—	—
Episode 2 (September 11, 2020)	3	Petr Tarenkov	60	Saint Petersburg	«Non ti scordar di me»	✔	✔	✔	✔
Episode 2 (September 11, 2020)	4	Nadezhda Stasyulevich	61	Kostanay, Kazakhstan	«Пой, гитара»	—	—	—	—
Episode 2 (September 11, 2020)	5	Igor Yatskov	60	Reni, Ukraine	«Bensonhurst Blues»	—	—	✔	—
Episode 2 (September 11, 2020)	6	Anna Shirochenko	67	Ashgabat, Turkmenistan	«Нашей юности оркестр»	—	—	—	—
Episode 2 (September 11, 2020)	7	Valentina Savosina	69	Khmelinets, Lipetsk Oblast	«На побывку едет»	—	—	—	—
Episode 2 (September 11, 2020)	8	Irina Fedotova	62	Cherepovets, Vologda Oblast	«Lullaby of Birdland»	—	✔	✔	✔
Episode 2 (September 11, 2020)	9	Nikolay Sakharov	61	Moscow	«Живёт моя отрада»	✔	—	—	—
Episode 2 (September 11, 2020)	10	Lyubov Soshnikova	80	Saint Petersburg	«Песня Анюты»	—	—	—	—
Episode 2 (September 11, 2020)	11	Alexander Chumak	63	Grozny	«Полёт на дельтаплане»	—	✔	—	—
Episode 3 (Note: Elena Vaenga is The Best Coach of episode 3.) (September 18, 2020)	1	Lyubov Ostretsova	74	Starye Bakury, Kirov Oblast	«Гляжу в озёра синие»	—	—	✔	—
Episode 3 (September 18, 2020)	2	Stefano Voice	67	Bulgaria	«Tu vuò fa l’americano»	—	—	—	✔
Episode 3 (September 18, 2020)	3	Alla Ponomaryova	74	Saratov	«Челита»	✔	—	—	✔
Episode 3 (September 18, 2020)	4	Vsevolod Ushakov	82	Moscow	«Ария Мистера Икс»	—	✔	—	✔
Episode 3 (September 18, 2020)	5	Afina Delionidi	60	Kentau, Kazakhstan / Greece	«Dov'è l'amore»	—	Team full	—	—
Episode 3 (September 18, 2020)	6	Evgeny Baranov	82	Moscow	«Три года ты мне снилась»	—	Team full	—	—
Episode 3 (September 18, 2020)	7	Tatyana Shupenya	60	Kirovsk, Leningrad Oblast	«Misty»	—	Team full	—	✔
Episode 3 (September 18, 2020)	8	Valery Kucherenko	63	Kazakhstan	«Чёрные глаза»	✔	Team full	—	Team full
Episode 3 (September 18, 2020)	9	Tamara Subbotina	82	Arkhangelsk	«Ленинградские мосты»	Team full	Team full	—	Team full
Episode 3 (September 18, 2020)	10	Vladimir Kozyrev	66	Rybinsk, Yaroslavl Oblast	«La vie en rose»	Team full	Team full	—	Team full
Episode 3 (September 18, 2020)	11	Svetlana Goncharova	60	Volgodonsk, Rostov Oblast	«Зачем вы, девочки, красивых любите?»	✔	✔	✔	✔

== The Knockouts ==
Artist was saved by the Public's votes
Artist was eliminated

Episode	Coach	Order	Artist	Song	Result
Episode 4 (September 25, 2020) (Note: Elena Vaenga is The Best Coach of episode 4.)	Tamara Gverdtsiteli	1	Valery Agabekov	«Volare»	Eliminated
Episode 4 (September 25, 2020)	Tamara Gverdtsiteli	2	Andrey Papazyan	«Верни мне музыку»	Eliminated
Episode 4 (September 25, 2020)	Tamara Gverdtsiteli	3	Alexander Chumak	«Снег»	Eliminated
Episode 4 (September 25, 2020)	Tamara Gverdtsiteli	4	Vsevolod Ushakov	«Улица, улица»	Advanced
Episode 4 (September 25, 2020)	Tamara Gverdtsiteli	5	Dina Yudina	«Осенние листья»	Advanced
Episode 4 (September 25, 2020)	Garik Sukachov	6	Galina Grozina	«Я тебя подожду»	Advanced
Episode 4 (September 25, 2020)	Garik Sukachov	7	Sergey Shikalov	«The Road to Hell»	Eliminated
Episode 4 (September 25, 2020)	Garik Sukachov	8	Irina Fedotova	«Друзья, купите папиросы»	Eliminated
Episode 4 (September 25, 2020)	Garik Sukachov	9	Tatyana Shupenya	«Back to Black»	Advanced
Episode 4 (September 25, 2020)	Garik Sukachov	10	Stefano Voice	«Чёртово колесо»	Eliminated
Episode 4 (September 25, 2020)	Elena Vaenga	11	Svetlana Goncharova	«По диким степям Забайкалья»	Eliminated
Episode 4 (September 25, 2020)	Elena Vaenga	12	Igor Yatskov	«Right Here Waiting»	Eliminated
Episode 4 (September 25, 2020)	Elena Vaenga	13	Irina Anikina	«Очередь за счастьем»	Advanced
Episode 4 (September 25, 2020)	Elena Vaenga	14	Vyacheslav Olkhovsky	«'O surdato 'nnammurato»	Advanced
Episode 4 (September 25, 2020)	Elena Vaenga	15	Lyubov Ostretsova	«Течёт река Волга»	Eliminated
Episode 4 (September 25, 2020)	Lev Leshchenko	16	Valentin Buzovkin	«Torna a Surriento»	Eliminated
Episode 4 (September 25, 2020)	Lev Leshchenko	17	Valery Kucherenko	«Пісня про рушник»	Advanced
Episode 4 (September 25, 2020)	Lev Leshchenko	18	Nikolay Sakharov	«Поручик Голицын»	Eliminated
Episode 4 (September 25, 2020)	Lev Leshchenko	19	Alla Ponomaryova	«Куда бежишь, тропинка милая?»	Eliminated
Episode 4 (September 25, 2020)	Lev Leshchenko	20	Petr Tarenkov	«’O sole mio»	Advanced

== Live Final ==
Colour key

Artist was saved by the Public's votes
Artist was eliminated

Episode	Coach	Order	Artist	Song	Public's vote	Result
Episode 5 (October, 2)
Episode 5 (October, 2)	Final					
Episode 5 (October, 2)	Lev Leshchenko	1	Valery Kucherenko	«Mamma»	38.3%	Eliminated
Episode 5 (October, 2)	Lev Leshchenko	2	Petr Tarenkov	«Вдоль по улице метелица метёт»	61.7%	Advanced
Episode 5 (October, 2)	Tamara Gverdtsiteli	3	Dina Yudina	«Если б не было войны»	78.2%	Advanced
Episode 5 (October, 2)	Tamara Gverdtsiteli	4	Vsevolod Ushakov	«Песня о далёкой Родине»	21.8%	Eliminated
Episode 5 (October, 2)	Elena Vaenga	5	Irina Anikina	«Колыбельная сыну»	56.6%	Advanced
Episode 5 (October, 2)	Elena Vaenga	6	Vyacheslav Olkhovsky	«Дивлюсь я на небо»	43.4%	Eliminated
Episode 5 (October, 2)	Garik Sukachov	7	Galina Grozina	«Наши мамы»	43.6%	Eliminated
Episode 5 (October, 2)	Garik Sukachov	8	Tatyana Shupenya	«Ты, ты, только ты»	56.4%	Advanced
Episode 5 (October, 2)	Super Final					
Episode 5 (October, 2)	Lev Leshchenko	1	Petr Tarenkov	"Granada"	40.4%	Runner-up
Episode 5 (October, 2)	Tamara Gverdtsiteli	2	Dina Yudina	«На тот большак»	59.6%	Winner
Episode 5 (October, 2)	Elena Vaenga	3	Irina Anikina	«Старинные часы»	Third place	
Episode 5 (October, 2)	Garik Sukachov	4	Tatyana Shupenya	«Город детства»	Third place	

== Best Coach ==
Colour key

- Best Coach
- Second place
- Third place
- Episode's Best Coach

Coach	Public's vote _{(per episode)}					Result
Coach	#1	#2	#3	#4	Av.	Result
Lev Leshchenko	34%	35%	28%	26%	31%	Best Coach
Elena Vaenga	22%	17%	30%	29%	25%	Second place
Garik Sukachov	22%	30%	22%	21%	22%	Third place
Tamara Gverdtsiteli	22%	18%	20%	24%	22%	Third place

== Reception ==
=== Rating ===
Episode		Original airdate	Production	Time slot (UTC+3)	Audience		Source
Episode		Original airdate	Production	Time slot (UTC+3)	Rating	Share	Source
1	"The Blind Auditions Premiere"	September 4, 2020	301	Friday 9:30 p.m.	4.9	18.9	
2	"The Blind Auditions, Part 2"	September 11, 2020	302	Friday 9:30 p.m.	4.8	18.5	
3	"The Blind Auditions, Part 3"	September 18, 2020	303	Friday 9:30 p.m.	4.9	18.8	
4	"The Knockouts"	September 27, 2020	304	Friday 9:30 p.m.	4.0	17.1	
5	"The Final"	October 2, 2020	305	Friday 9:30 p.m.	4.2	16.6	
