= Maidanik =

Maidanik, Maidannik and Maidanchik (Майданик, Майданник, Майданчик) are Jewish surnames originated in the Russian Empire. Maidannik or Maidannik is also a Ukrainian surname. They were derived from the Ukrainian word maidannink, which means "worker in tar". In the Russian language, maidannik also means "con man operating in a marketplace" (from the word "maidan"). A similar sounding Croatian surname is Maidandzic (Majdandžić), possibly unrelated.

Maidanik or Maydanik may refer to:

- Kiva Maidanik, a Soviet Russian historian and political scientist
- Yuri Maidanik, inventor of the loop heat pipe and a 1999 recipient of the State Prize of the Russian Federation in science and technology

Maidannik or Maydannik may refer to:

- Igor Maidannik, executive vice president for legal support of the TNK-BP Russian oil company
