= Urgant =

Urgant is a Russian surname, derived from the Estonian surname Urgand. Notable people with the surname include:

- Ivan Urgant (born 1978), Russian television host, presenter, actor, musician, and producer
- Nina Urgant (1929–2021), Russian actress, grandmother of Ivan

== See also ==
- Evening Urgant, Russian talk show hosted by Ivan Urgant
