= Igor Kashintsev =

Soviet and Russian actor (1932–2015)

- Born: 17 June 1932; Moscow, Soviet Union
- Died: 11 December 2015 (aged 83); Moscow, Russia
- Occupation: Actor
- Years active: 1963–2015

Igor Konstantinovich Kashintsev (Russian: Игорь Константинович Кашинцев; 17 June 1932 – 11 December 2015) was a Soviet and Russian film and theater actor. He was a People's Artist of Russia (2003) and was awarded the Order of Friendship (2008).

He was also known for his readings of the works of Chekhov, Averchenko and Zoshchenko in the Moscow State Philharmonic. He died in 2015, aged 83.

== Selected filmography ==
- July Rain (1966)
- Wings (1966)
- The Golden Calf (1968)
- Investigation Held by ZnaToKi (1971)
- This Merry Planet (1973)
- The Flight of Mr. McKinley (1975)
- Pirates of the 20th Century (1979)
- Yeralash (1982)
- We Weren't Married in Church (1982)
- Time for Rest from Saturday to Monday (1984)
- Dead Souls (1984)
- Battle of Moscow (1985)
- Frenzied Bus (1990)
- Trifles of Life (1992)
- Kiss Not for the Рress (2008)
