= Dmitry Kuznetsov discography =

- Studio albums: 4
- EPs: 4
- Remix albums: 2
- Singles: 17+
- Music videos: 30+
- Films: 16
- Collaborative singles: 21
- Tours: 3

The discography of Russian rapper Dmitry Kuznetsov, otherwise known as Husky, includes both independent albums, music videos, and short films to collaborative singles, EPs, and remixes of previously released music. Almost all of Kuznetsov's music is in Russian, although his music can be accessed via Western music streaming platforms like Spotify, Apple Music, and YouTube. Having begun releasing music formally in 2011, his first studio album, 'A Dog's Life,' was released in 2013 marking his official beginnings as an independent rapper. Kuznetsov is considered among the top contemporary 'New School' rappers in Russia, while according to others among the top 10 best rappers in Russia.

As of December 14, 2024, Kuznetsov's single, 'Chanson 2,' topped Bandlink's Top 100 new releases at #59, while his 2020 track, 'Never-Ever,' reached the Russian Spotify Top 10 for seven days, although other tracks like 'NPC,' 'Ditties,' and 'Revenge,' while being on Russian Spotify's Top 200, have not reached the Daily Top 10. In April, 2019, he was considered one of the ten "most promising" musicians under 30 from Russian by Forbes Russia. In 2019, Husky's track 'Kill Me' was included in the Top 50 Songs of 2019 by The.Flow. In 2021, Husky was personally nominated for Forbes Russia 30 Under 30 but ultimately was not chosen. During the 2020 Jager Music Awards, Husky was awarded the Artist of The Year Award, and has participated as a jury member for the annual National Bestseller Prize competition.

In addition to music, Husky's oeuvre includes films as both an actor and director, totaling 15 as of 2025.

== Albums ==
Title (Russian)	Title (English)	Type	Release date	Producer(s)
Partizan	Partizan	Studio	2025	DJ Hvolst
Cбчь Жзнь	Dog's Life	Studio	2013	Эфди Вадим (FD Vadim), Хаски (Husky), JF (Producer), Off Beat (Rap), Wabis Band Productions
Любимые песни (воображаемых) людей	Favorite Songs of (Imaginary) People	Studio	2017	bollywoodFM, DDC∆† (RUS), Gangan, Хаски (Husky), QT
Хошхоног	Khoshkhonog	Studio	2020	Бхима (Bhima), bollywoodFM, Gangan, Хаски (Husky), Loubenski, Shinigami Tenshi, SP4K, White Punk, ЗАЛПОМ (ZALPOM), zavet
Русский альбом	Russian Album	Mini	2024	Бхима (Bhima), dj hvost, White Punk, Яма нора (Yama nora)
10 лет собачьей жизни	10 Years of a Dog's Life	Compilation	2024	Self-release
Триптих о Человечине	Triptych on Human Flesh	Mini	2018	QT
Автопортреты	Self-Portraits	Mini	2015	Эфди Вадим (FD Vadim), QT
Искажение	Distortion	Remix	2018	A.Fruit, BOGUE, Fisky, Nphonix, Pixelord, Raumskaya, SP4K, Summer of Haze
Это все ху	It's All Sh	Remix	2020	Dirty Move Beats
У	U	Collaborative	2019	bollywoodFM, DRK9SS, Gangan
Под Впечатлением	Under the Impression	Collaborative	2010	

== Singles ==
Title (Russian)	Title (English)	Release date	Details
Возвращение легенды	Return of the Legend	2011	First round track for Hip-Hop.ru's 'Battle 9' Competition
На улицах будущего	On The Streets of the Future	2011	Second round track for Hip-Hop.ru's 'Battle 9' Competition
Закономерные случайности	Regular Accidents	2011	Third round track for Hip-Hop.ru's 'Battle 9' Competition
Небо ненавидит нас	The Sky Hates Us	2017	
Крот ’17	Mole 17	2017	
Смотрящий	Watchers	2017	
Поэма о Родине	Poem of the Motherland	August 30, 2018	
Седьмое октября	Seventh of October	October 8, 2019	
NPC		May 6, 2021	
Эскимо	Eksimo	2022	This was released under Husky's alternative name, 'DJ Hvost,' as his debut as a beat maker.
Горячая Линия	Hotline	2022	This was released under Husky's alternative name, 'DJ Hvost,' as his debut as a beat maker.
Ноктюрн	Nocturne	2022	
О Любви	About Love	April 21, 2023	Released under the name DJ Hvost
Сказки	Fairy Tales	2024	
Громко	Loudly	2024	Released under the name DJ Hvost
Шансон 2	Chanson 2	2024	The first track of the 'Chanson EP'
Молодой Русский (Яма Нора remix)	Young Russian	2024	
Сколько стоят деньги?	What is Money Worth	2024	DJ Hvost
Заложник	Hostage	2025	DJ Hvost
kanye west diss	kanye west diss	2025	DJ Hvost
Я объявляю вам войну	I declare war on you	2025	DJ Hvost
Танцы на снегу	Dances in the snow	2025	
Ветром Снегом Зноем	Wind Snow Heat	2025	

== Collaborative singles ==
Title (Russian)	Title (English)	Main Artist	Featured artist(s)	Release date
Где твои мечты?	Where are your dreams?	Namzhil	Husky	2013
Десятка	Ten	РИЧ	Husky, Zakhar Prilepin	2014
Пора валить	Time to Leave	РИЧ	Husky, Zakhar Prilepin	2014
Метан	Methane	РИЧ	Husky	2015
На океан	At the Ocean	РИЧ	Husky, Zakhar Prilepin, Alexander F. Sklyar	2015
Месть	Revenge	Elephunk	РИЧ, Husky	2015
У дома	At home	РИЧ	Husky	2016
Луна	Moon	Озёра	Husky	2017
Наше лето	Our Summer	25/17	Husky, Sagrada	2017
Пузыри	Bubbles	Бакей	Kakora, Husky	2018
В тебе	In you	Типси Тип	Husky	2018
	98 flow	Big Baby Tape	Husky	2018
ВОКРУГ ТАК МНОГО ВСЕГО	There's So Much Around	КАЗУСКОМА	Husky	2018
Cингл	Single	Jeembo	Husky	2019
Топь	Swamp	Jeembo	Husky	2019
Паучъе молоко	Spider Milk	White Punk	Husky	2019
Один мальчик	One Boy	Elephunk	Husky	2019
Блабла	Blablabla	Pixelord	Husky	2019
	Lifestyle	NEIKED	Husky	2019
Экипаж	Crew	OFFMi	Husky, Bollywood FM	2020
Иглы и огни	Needles and Lights	Zavet	Husky	2020
Монумент	Monument	Zavet	Husky	2020
Весело и грустно	Happy and Sad	IC3PEAK	Husky	2020
Оазис	Oasis	Everthe8	Husky	2020
Поколения	Generations	25/17	Hashtag, Husky	2020
Сон эсера	Dream of Revolution	РИЧ	Husky	2021
Колдунья	Witch	БАТЕРС	Husky	2021
Смола	Resin	Bhima	Husky	2021
ПЛАЦКАРТ	Reserved Seat	Soda luv	Husky	2021
Я хочу быть красивым	I want to be beautiful	MB Paket	Husky	2022
Мамбо	Mamba	Little Buddhist	Husky, METAGHETTO	2023
Рекламная пауза	Commercial Break	Affinage Band	Husky, Yury Muzychenko, Alexander Sklyar	2023
Громко	Loudly	Husky	Kishlak	2024
Русалка	Mermaid	Rudolf Strausov	Husky	2024
Паучъе Молоко (Locked Club Remix)		White Punk	Husky	2025
House Party		DJ Stonik1917	Husky	2025
Два инцела	Two Incels		Zangezhi	2026

== Select Music Videos ==
Husky began posting music videos on his YouTube channel beginning in 2011, with regular output of music videos connected to releases.

Title (Russian)	Title (English)	Release details	Visual Director(s)	YouTube Views (Note: Figures from 2011 to 2024 are from December, 2024. Figures from 2025 to 2026 are from January, 2026.)
Седьмое октября	Seventh of October	2011		1.6 million
Космолет	Spaceship	2013		1.3 million
Черным-черно	Blackest Black	2016	Vlad Zizdok	7.2 million
Пуля-дура	Bullet Fool	2016	Apache Video	12 million
Панелька		2017	Vladislav Zizdok	11 million
Ай	Ay	2017	Igor Klepnev	5.5 million
Пироман 17	Pyromaniac 17	2017	Roman Varnin	5.4 million
Крот 17	Mole 17	2017	Dima Maseykin, Bakehouse	4.8 million
Иуда	Judas	2018	Lado Quatania	10 million
Поэма о Родине	Poem about the Homeland	2018	Igor Klepnev	8.6 million
Детка-Голливуд	Baby Hollywood	2019	Artem Zamashnoy and Olya Pankova	1.7 million
Седьмое октября	Seventh of October	2019	ATAKA51	6.9 million
Убей меня	Kill Me	2019	Lado Quatania	4.5 million
Никогда-нибудь	Nothing-Nothing	2020	Evgeniy Bakirov	1.6 million
Бесконечный магазин	Endless Store	2020	Dima Maseykin	2.9 million
Реванш	Revenge	2021	Lado Quatania	1.9 million
Невидимка	Invisible	2021	Evgeny Bakirov	1.6 million
Песня для К	Song for K	2022	Rosher, Uzen, A111ur	964,000
Некро	Necro	2022	АТАКА51, Fetish film	501,000
О любви	About Love	2023	Igor Klepnev	1.4 million
Сказки	Fairy Tales	2024	Konstantin Yeronin, Vladimir Repin	1.6 million
Молодой русский	Young Russian	2024	Dima Kraemglaz	1.1 million
Сколько стоят деньги	How Much is Money Worth?	2024	Roman Mikhailov	471,000
Шансон 2	Chanson 2	2024	Vitaly Akimov	154,415

== Films ==
Year	Title (Russian)	Title (English)	Role(s)	Producer(s)
2017	Психотроника	Psychotronics	Director, choreographer, actor, composer	Olga Mitina, Ilya Dzhincharadze, Murad Osmann, Ilya Stewart
2018	Хрусталь	Crystal	Actor	Birgit Goernbock, Olga Goister, Debbie Vandermeulen, Valery Dmitrochenko
2018	Подвал	Basement	Actor	Igor Voloshin, Zhanna Kalinina, Alexandra Voronkova
2019	BEEF: Русский хип-хоп	BEEF: Russian Hip-Hop	Actor	Roma Zhigan, Andrey Alekseev, Andrey Zubov, Alexey Petrukhin, Alena Mareeva, Yuri Dushin
2019	Люцифер	Lucifer	Director, choreographer, actor, composer	ATAKA51
2020	Внутренний огонь	Inner Fire	Actor	Evgeny Tarlo, Yuri Chernyaev, Alexander Delvig
2020	Высотка	High-Rise Building	Actor	Seraphim Orekhanov
2021	Сказка о глухом и волшебной музыке	A Tale of a Deaf Man and Magical Music	Actor	Philip Yuryev
2021	Казнь	Execution	Actor	Ilya Stewart, Murad Osmann, Pavel Burya, Ilya Dzhincharadze, Elizaveta Chalenko, Natalia Frolova, Ivan Syscov, Nikita Kvatania
2021	Ниримдор	Nirimdor	Actor	Characteristics, Zavet
2021	Петровы в гриппе	Petrovs in flu	Actor	Kirill Serebrennikov
2022	Объекты в зеркале	Objects in the Mirror	Actor	Alina Nasibullina
2024	Надо снимать фильмы о любви	We Need To Make Films About Love	Actor	Roman Mikhailov
2024	Жар-птица	Firebird	Actor	Roman Mikhailov
2025	Искупление	Atonement	Actor	Konstantin Eronin
2026	Лермонтов	Lermonotov	Actor	Pavel Lungin

== Further links ==
- Discogs: Husky
- Genius discography: Husky
