= Vadim Kozhevnikov =

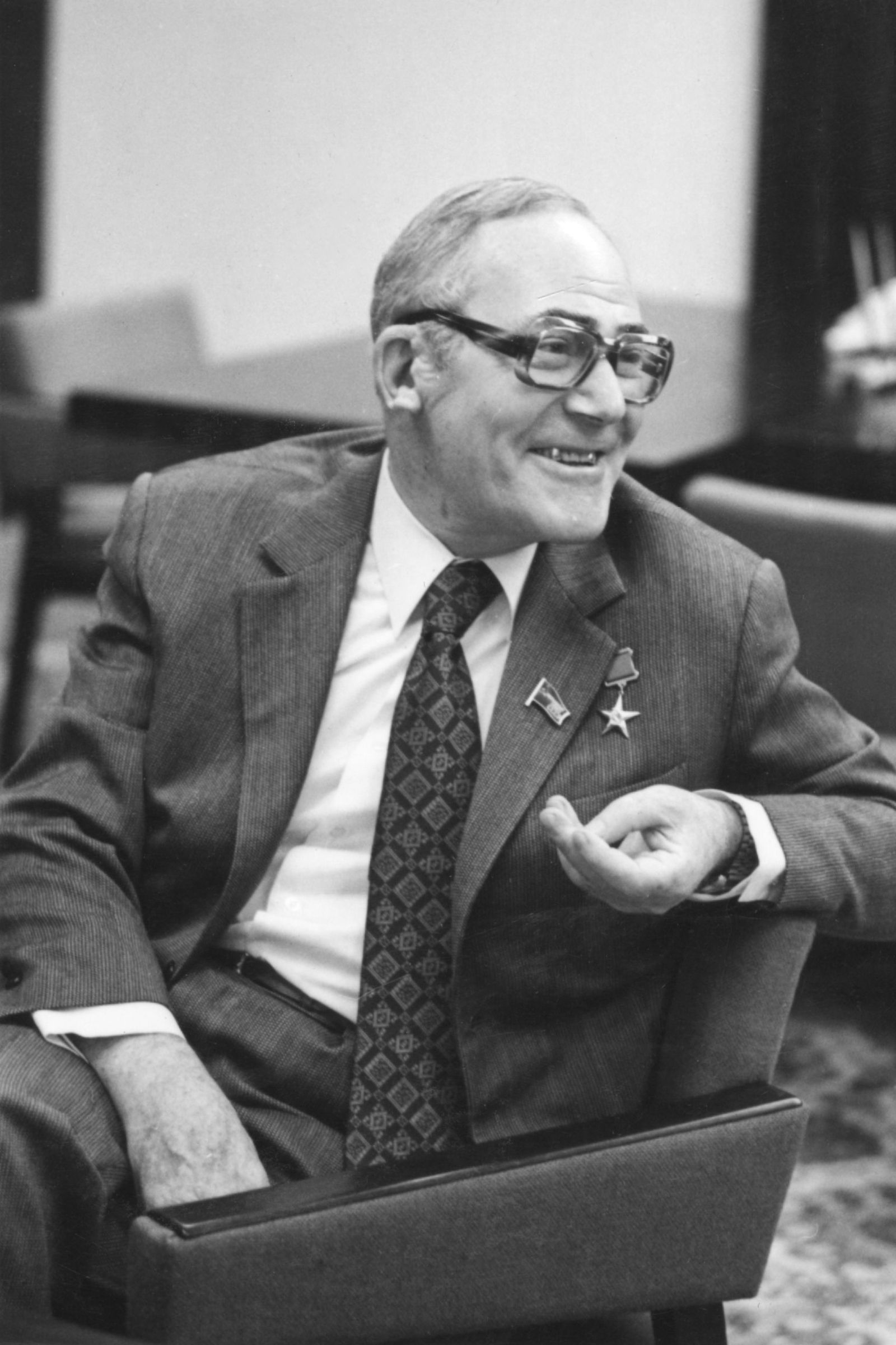
- Born: Vadim Mikhailovich Kozhevnikov; 22 April [O.S. 9 April] 1909; Togur, Tomsk Governorate, Russian Empire
- Died: 20 October 1984 (aged 75); Moscow, Soviet Union
- Education: Moscow State University
- Occupations: Writer, journalist
- Writing career
- Notable awards: USSR State Prize, Order of Lenin, Order of the October Revolution, Order of the Patriotic War, Order of the Red Banner of Labour, Order of the Red Star, Medal "For the Defence of Moscow", Medal "For the Defence of Sevastopol", Medal "For the Victory over Germany in the Great Patriotic War 1941–1945", Medal "For the Defence of Stalingrad", Medal "For the Capture of Berlin", Jubilee Medal "In Commemoration of the 100th Anniversary of the Birth of Vladimir Ilyich Lenin"

Vadim Mikhailovich Kozhevnikov (Russian: Вадим Михайлович Кожевников; 22 April [O.S. 9 April] 1909, Togur – 20 October 1984, Moscow) was a Soviet writer and journalist. His daughter Nadezhda Kozhevnikova is also a writer.

== Biography ==
Vadim Kozevnikov was born to a Russian family in the Siberian town of Togur, Tomsk Governorate, where his revolutionary-minded father, a physician, had been sent as an internal exile by the authorities of the Russian Empire.

Kozhevnikov studied literature and ethnology at Moscow State University, graduating in 1933. Kozhevnikov worked as a war correspondent for Pravda from 1941 to 1945, joining the Communist Party of the Soviet Union halfway into the German-Soviet War in 1943. He was elected secretary of the Union of Soviet Writers in 1949.

Kozhevnikov was officially recognized as a Hero of Socialist Labour for his contributions to Soviet literature and was elected to one term as a politician to the Supreme Soviet of the Soviet Union. He was awarded the USSR State Prize following the publication of two of his novels in 1971.

A full-scale overview of Kozhevnikov's work, written by Soviet literary critic Iosif Grinberg, was published in Moscow in 1972.

On August 31, 1973, V. M. Kozhevnikov signed a letter by a group of Soviet writers addressed to the editorial board of Pravda concerning A. I. Solzhenitsyn and A. D. Sakharov. The letter stated: “Solzhenitsyn openly violates Soviet laws and behaves in an unconstitutional manner. He supports war propaganda and speaks out against détente. It is necessary to calmly resolve the issue of expelling him from the USSR.”

He died in Moscow aged 75, and was buried in the Peredelkino Cemetery.

== Awards ==
- Hero of Socialist Labour (1974)
- 2 Orders of Lenin (1967, 1974)
- 2 Orders of the Red Banner of Labour (1959, 1979)
- Order of the October Revolution (1971)
- 2 Orders of the Patriotic War, 1st class (1945)
- Order of the Red Star (1942)
- USSR State Prize (1971)

== English translations ==
- The Captain, from Such a Simple Thing and Other Stories, Foreign Languages Publishing House, 1959. from Archive.org
- Shield and Sword: The amazing Career of a Soviet Agent in the Nazi Secret Service, MacGibbon and Kee, 1970.
- Shield and Sword, Mayflower Books, 1973.
- The Strong in Spirit, Progress Publishers, 1973.
- Ivan Fomich, from Anthology of Soviet Short Stories, Vol 2, Progress Publishers, 1976.
- Special Subunit: Two Novellas, Imported Publications, 1984.

== Bibliography ==
- Tales of the War (Рассказы о войне, 1942)
- The Boy from the Outskirts (Мальчик с окраины, screenplay, 1947)
- Ahead to the Dawn (Заре навстречу), 1956—1957
- Meet Baluyev! (Знакомьтесь, Балуев!), 1960 (film adaptation, 1963)
- Flying Day (День летящий), 1962
- The Shield and the Sword (Щит и меч), 1965 (film adaptation, 1968)
- At Noon on the Sunny Side (В полдень на солнечной стороне), 1973
- Roots and Herbs (Корни и крона), 1981—1982
