= Alexander F. Sklyar =

Russian musician (born 1958)

Alexander Felixovich Sklyar Александр Феликсович Скляр
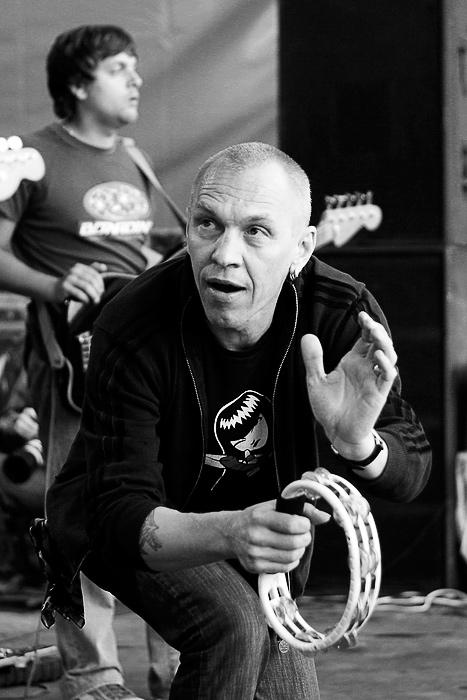
- Alexander Sklyar on stage of Nashestviye-2008

Background information
- Born: March 7, 1958 (age 68); Moscow, Russian SFSR, Soviet Union (present-day Russia)
- Genres: Alternative rock, russian chanson, Bard Rock, indie rock, jazz-rock
- Instrument: Guitar
- Years active: 1979–present
- Formerly of: va-bank
- Website: www.afsklyar.ru (in Russian)

Alexander Felixovich Sklyar (Note: Russian: Александр Феликсович Скляр, romanized: Aleksandr Feliksovich Sklyar) (born March 7, 1958) is a Russian rock musician, radio presenter, actor and author. Sklyar, who in the 1980s and early 1990s fronted the popular punk metal band Va-bank, later moved into the traditional Russian singer-songwriter territory covering the vast stylistic spectrum (Alexander Vertinsky, Vladimir Vysotsky, Leonid Utyosov, Mark Bernes).

== Biography ==
Sklyar was born in Moscow, to Felix Sidorovich, a physicist, and his journalist wife Irina Viktorovna, a one time Rabotnitsa magazine second editor. In 1985 Sklyar graduated from the prestigious Moscow State Institute of International Relations and joined the Soviet embassy in North Korea as a minor official. Upon return later this year he became a member of the band Tsentr, fronted by Vasily Shumov (whom he played with in 1979 as a guitarist in 777, the band's first incarnation) and took part in the recording the Priznaki zhizni (Signs of Life) LP.

In 1991 Sklyar debuted as a children's writer with the book Petrovich and Potapum in the Magic Labyrinth, co-authored by Roman Kanushkin. The same year he started his own rock radio series Utchites plavat (Learn to Swim) on Radio Maximum (it later re-surfaced on Station-2000). In 1995 he formed the duo Botsman i brodyaga (The Boatswain and the Tramp) with Garik Sukachov of the Brigada S fame. 1998 saw Sklyar going solo with the album Po napravleniyu k tango (Moving Closer to Tango), starting to experiment with different retro styles of popular Russian music. In 2001–2009 Sklyar appeared in seven Russian feature films and tried himself as a TV film and music programs' presenter on TV3 and TV Kultura.

== Political activity ==
In January 2015 in the Internet appeared a video with a song recorded to support Russian separatists in the war on East Ukraine. Alexander F. Sklyar, as well as Ivan Okhlobystin and Garik Sukachov took part in it.

In April and May 2022, Sklyar participated in a series of concerts organized in order to support the 2022 Russian invasion of Ukraine.

In January 2023 Ukraine imposed sanctions on him for promoting Russia during the invasion.

== Discography ==
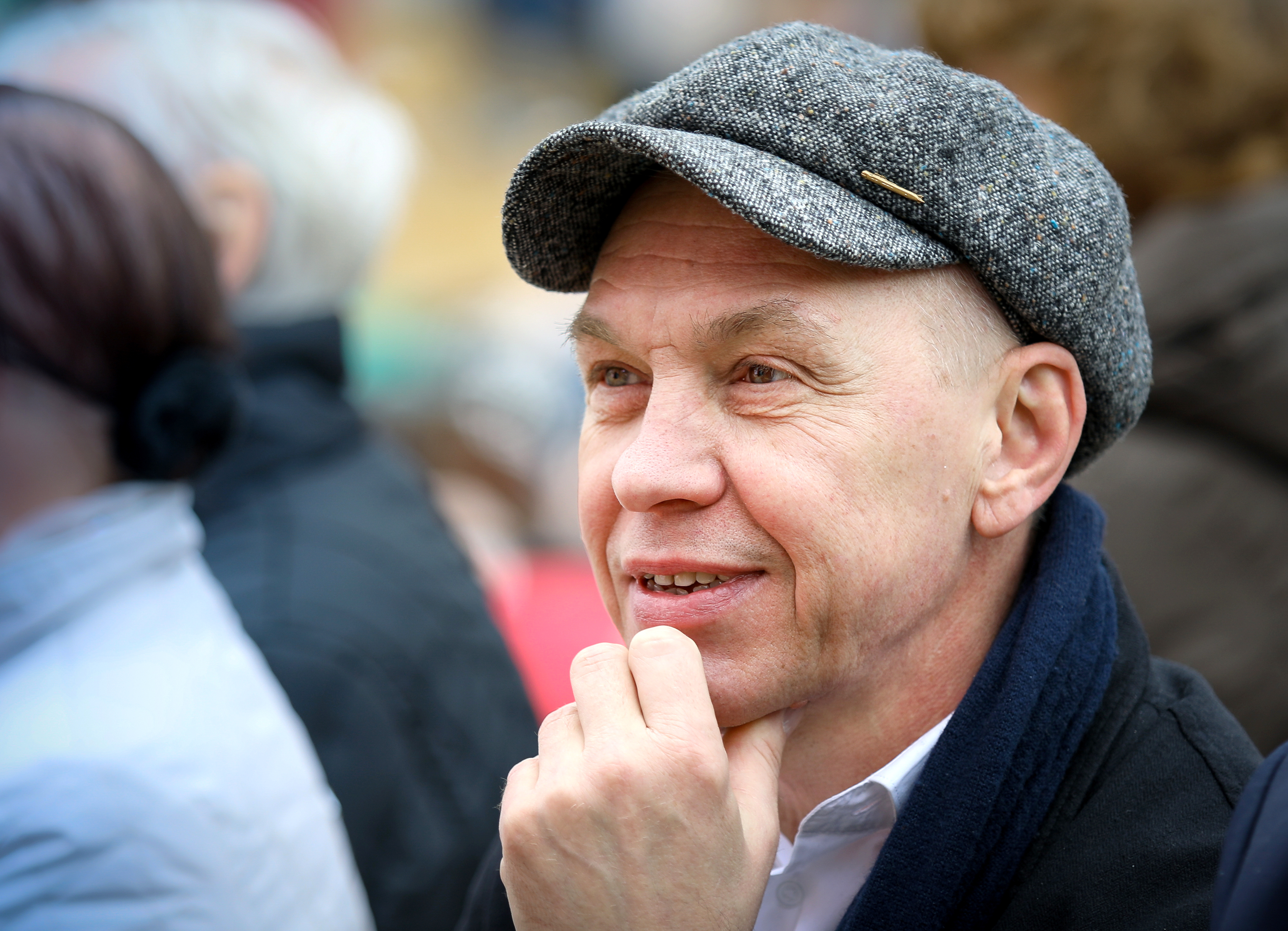
Aleksander Sklyar at the "Red Square" Book Festival (2017)

=== With Va-Bank ===
- VA-BANK (Ва-Банкъ, 1988)
- Life on Wheels (Жизнь на колесах, 1989)
- Drink for Me (Выпей за меня, 1991)
- At the Kitchen (На кухне, 1993)
- That's How It Should Be! (Так nado!!, 1994)
- Live, What's Alive (Живи - Живое, 1995)
- Homewards! (Домой!!, 1997)
- The Lower Tunrda (Нижняя тундра, 1998, based upon Viktor Pelevin's novel)

=== Solo ===
- Getting Closer to Tango (По направлению к танго, 1998)
- Witches and Bitches (Ведьмы и стервы, 2002)
- DendyDiana (ДендиДиана, 2004)
- The X City (Город Х, 2007)
- Songs of Seamen (Песни моряков, 2008)
- Songs of Seamen 2 (2010)
- Vasya the Conscience (Вася-Совесть, 2011)
- The Russian Sun (Русское солнце, 2012, the songs by Alexander Vertinsky)
- The Word and the Deed (Слово и дело, 2013)

=== Collaborations ===
- The Botswain and the Tramp (Боцман и Бродяга, 1995, with Garik Sukachyov)
- The Gypsy Rock and Roll (Цыганский рок-н-ролл, 1997, with Zhemchuznye Brothers)
- Brazilian Cruiser. The Stranger Songs by A.N.Vertinsky (Бразильский крейсер. Странные песни Александра Вертинского, 2000, with Irina Bogushevskaya)
