= We Weren't Married in Church =

- Russian: Нас венчали не в церкви
- Directed by: Boris Tokarev
- Written by: Natan Eidelman; Sergei Sinegub; Aleksandr Svobodin
- Produced by: Boris Krishtul
- Starring: Aleksandr Galibin; Natalya Vavilova; Pyotr Velyaminov; Lyudmila Gladunko; Aleksei Zharkov
- Cinematography: Nikolay Nemolyaev
- Edited by: Valentina Kulagina
- Music by: Isaac Schwartz
- Production company: Mosfilm
- Release date: 1982
- Running time: 81 min.
- Country: Soviet Union
- Language: Russian

We Weren't Married in Church (Russian: Нас венчали не в церкви, romanized: Nas venchali ne v tserkvi) is a 1982 Soviet historical romance film directed by Boris Tokarev.

== Plot ==
The film tells about the daughter of a clergyman who fictitiously marries a revolutionary. Over time, a real love arises between them, but suddenly he is sent to hard labor.

== Cast ==
- Aleksandr Galibin as Sergey Silych Sinegub
- Natalya Vavilova as Larisa Chemodanova, priest's daughter
- Pyotr Velyaminov as Father Vasily
- Lyudmila Gladunko as Anna
- Aleksei Zharkov as Ivan Fedorovich
- Galina Polskikh as Vasily's wife
- Rita Gladunko as guest
- Boris Bachurin as Pyotr
- Dmitri Popov as Petechka
- Igor Kashintsev as Father Mikhail
- Georgy Burkov as a man on a cart
