= Little Alexander =

- Russian: Александр Маленький
- Directed by: Vladimir Fokin
- Written by: Ingeburg Kretschmar; Vladimir Ezhov; Vladimir Fokin
- Starring: Boris Tokarev; Yuriy Nazarov; Mikhail Kokshenov; Olaf Schneider; Ute Lubosch
- Cinematography: Sergey Filippov
- Edited by: Tamara Belyayeva
- Music by: Eduard Artemyev
- Release date: 1981
- Running time: 98 minute
- Countries: Soviet Union; East Germany
- Language: Russian

Little Alexander (Russian: Александр Маленький) is a 1981 Soviet World War II film directed by Vladimir Fokin.

== Plot ==
The film takes place in May 1945. Soviet soldiers save children in Blankenheim from the Werewolf attack, organize an orphanage in which begins the story of a boy who was abandoned by refugees. Russians called him Little Alexander.

== Cast ==
- Boris Tokarev
- Yuriy Nazarov
- Mikhail Kokshenov as Soldat Kurykin (as Michail Kokschenow)
- Olaf Schneider
- Ute Lubosch
- Gerry Wolff as Hübner
- Walfriede Schmitt as Friedel
- Nikolai Skorobogatov as Russanow
- Olaf Boddeutsch as Peter
- Jana Lenz as Irmgard
