= Nadezhda Kozhevnikova =

Russian writer and journalist

Nadezhda Vadimovna Kozhevnikova (Russian: Надежда Вадимовна Кожевникова; born April 7, 1949, in Moscow) is a Russian writer and journalist, and the daughter of Soviet writer Vadim Kozhevnikov.

== Biography ==
In her youth, Kozhevnikova devoted herself to music. She studied in the musical school attached to the Moscow Conservatory. Her interest in literature, however, led her away from music. She studied at the Maxim Gorky Literature Institute.

She began her literary career as a journalist. She travelled throughout the Soviet Union on assignment, writing articles concerning the problems of the day. Her first stories were published while she was still a student. She uses a conventional realistic style. Her works deal with the lives of the urban intelligentsia. Nadezhda published 19 books and hundreds of press articles. "Helena the magnificent" was considered one of the Soviet bestsellers and has been republished many times since its first publication in 1982.

== English translations ==
- Attorney Alexandra Tikhonovna, from Always a Woman: Stories by Soviet Women Writers, Raduga Publishers, Moscow, 1987.
