= Barto (band) =

Electropunk and electroclash band

- Origin: Saint Petersburg, Russia
- Genres: Electropunk, electroclash
- Years active: 2006-present
- Members: Maria Lubicheva; Evgenii Kuprianov
- Website: https://bartomusic.ru/

Barto is an electropunk and electroclash band from Saint Petersburg, Russia, formed in 2006. The band's music is characterized by strong and ironic statements with a social message.

== History ==
In 2007, Barto won the electronic music award at the Museon contest. A member of the jury, Russian musical reviewer Artemy Troitsky, published their debut LP on his label.

The musical press responded favorably to the album; Rolling Stone declared it best debut album. The leading Russian musical web portal, Zvuki.ru, described it as, "Fanciable anarchism of the text, mixed with the magnificent electroclash. As a result we have a very remarkable debut, straight from the shoulder lyrics, languishing bitchy vocal, jumping dancing rhythm and the exact mood. Barto is the real discovery of this year."

In the summer of 2008, Barto received the Steppenwolf (Russian Journalists' Choice Awards) Debut of the Year award and the MTV RMA for the best web project.

In the spring of 2009, the band released their second LP, Sex, Violence and the Good Mood and accompanied some tracks with video. Sex, Violence and the Good Mood was nominated for Album of the Year, Song of the Year, and Best Lyrics awards at the 2009 Steppenwolf show. Cosmopolitan magazine called it album of the year.

In 2010, the label SOYUZ released their third LP, Intellect, Conscience and Honour, including the cut version of the scandalous song Are you ready? Many famous musicians appeared in the album, such as the guitarist of Mumiy Troll Yury Tsaler, the punk poet Lekha Nikonov (Last Tanks in Paris), and the duo Prokhor and Puzo. Nikolay Kopeikin, the famous underground artist from St-Petersburg, painted three pictures especially for Barto, which were used in the decoration of their LP. "Intellect, Conscience and Honour" was nominated for album of the year at 2011 Steppenwolf Awards.

In 2011, the group shot a documentary series about themselves called Russian Star Trek or The Starway Nowhere, which depicted an uncut view into their off-stage life. Star Trek received warm praise from reviewers and was supported by such musical portals as Zvuki.ru, Fuzz and OpenSpace. Telechannels NTV, TNT, REN TV, MTV, Muz-TV, A-One, and Capital TV all showed pieces about Barto.

In 2012, the band released an album of their favorite covers called Hello, Totalitarianism! In May they went on the first major European tour, visiting seventeen cities and seven countries in three weeks: Belarus, Ukraine, Moldova, Estonia, Latvia, Poland and Germany. During the autumn and winter Barto worked on a new LP called Belle Epoque, released on SOYUZ in April 2013. The album was preceded by several singles and videos. The most well-known video was titled Kisya Heresy, a joint project with KACH, performing a cover of the famous Pussy Riot prayer. In April they released their 5th album Belle Epoque and went on tour in five countries, including 26 cities.

Since their inception, the group has given more than 300 concerts throughout Russia, from Kaliningrad to Khabarovsk, and also performed in India, Thailand, Vietnam & Mexico.

== Discography ==
=== Albums ===
- Barto (Russian: Барто) (2007)
- Seks, Nasilie i Khoroshee Nastroenie (Russian: Секс, Насилие И Хорошее Настроение, lit. 'Sex, Violence & a Good Mood') (2009)
- Remiksy (Russian: Ремиксы, lit. 'Remixes') (2010)
- Um, Sovest' i Chest' (Russian: Ум, Совесть и Честь, lit. 'Intellect, Conscience and Honor') (2010)
- Privet! Totalitarizm (Russian: Привет! Тоталитаризм, lit. 'Hello! Totalitarianism') (2012)
- Prekrasnaya Epokha (Russian: Прекрасная Эпоха, lit. 'Belle Epoque') (2013)
- Svetloe zavtra (Russian: Светлое завтра, lit. 'A bright tomorrow') (2017)

=== Videos ===
- Скоро всё ёбнется {feat. Naka}
- Цифровые нарКОТИКИ (10.08.2009)
- Берлин (09.09.09)
- Скоро всё ёбнется {feat. ПРОХОР, ПУЗО, ПАХОМ} (09.09.09)
- Танцпол (21.12.09)
- One love (25.01.10)
- Нужны (23.11.10)
- На яды {Мумий Тролль cover} (14.03.11)
- КГБ (11.04.11)
- Готов (26.12.11)
- 90-ые (01.01.12)
- Твоя любовь (18.05.12)
- Кiсья Ересь (Pussy Riot cover) (feat. Трэш-шапито КАЧ) (08.08.12)
- Письмо Клауса Номи (Полный Пиздец) (17.01.13)
- Сама (22.01.13)
