= Introduction to Life =

- Directed by: Igor Talankin
- Written by: Vera Panova
- Produced by: Lydia Kanareikina
- Starring: Boris Tokarev; Nina Urgant; Yuri Volkov; Nikolai Burlyayev; Natalia Bogunova
- Narrated by: Olga Bergholz
- Cinematography: Valeriy Vladimirov; Vladimir Minaev
- Music by: Alfred Schnittke
- Production company: Mosfilm
- Release date: 1963
- Running time: 101 minutes
- Country: Soviet Union
- Language: Russian

Introduction to Life (Russian: Вступление, romanized: Vstuplijenije) is a 1963 Soviet drama film about World War II seen through the eyes of a young boy from Leningrad. It won a Special Jury Prize at the 24th Venice International Film Festival.

== Plot ==
The Great Patriotic War is nearing the end. In a train two youths, Volodya (Boris Tokarev) and Valya (Natalia Bogunova) returning from evacuation to Leningrad cross paths for a few minutes. The plot carries them to their first random encounter that takes place in the summer of 1941 at a crowded refugee station. The period of growing adolescents, their introduction to adult life occurs in the arduous years of war. During the bombing of the evacuation train near the Mga station, dies Valya's mother (Lyubov Sokolova) and her younger sister Lyusya (Lida Volkova). After long wanderings in orphanages, she and her survived sister Alyonka are found by their aunt and taken to her house.

The fate of Volodya Jakubowski develops in a difficult way; mother (Nina Urgant) is divorced from his father (Yuri Volkov), who has long had another wife and son Oleg (Nikolai Burlyayev), a half-brother of Volodya. In evacuation the mother is trying to arrange her personal life, and gets close to the army captain (Stanislav Chekan). Not wanting to burden her, the teenager takes a job at a defensive aircraft factory and moves to a hostel. There he finds a good friend Romka (Valery Nosik). Learning that the woman is pregnant, the captain breaks up with Volodya's mother. The unfavorable reputation of a "loose" woman, a baby girl born without a father, make her unable to rent decent accommodation. The teen has a difficult time coping with his mother's unhappy personal life, and goes to Leningrad to his father, so that he would issue a due summons to the city from which the blockade was only recently lifted. Jakubowski Sr. initially refuses to help (facts about the mother's infidelity are discovered) but matured Volodya is insistent and gets what he wants. The father objects to communication between Volodya and Oleg; however, the teenagers are introduced and become friends.

== Cast ==
- Boris Tokarev as Volodya Yakubovsky
- Nina Urgant as mother of Volodya
- Yuri Volkov as Volodya's father
- Nikolai Burlyayev as Oleg
- Natalia Bohunova as Valya
- Lida Volkova as Lyusa
- Lyubov Sokolova as mother of Valya and Lyusa
- Lyubov Malinovskaya as Dusya
- Valery Nosik as Romka
- Viktor Avdyushko as Bobrov
- Vija Artmane as Latvian neighbor
