= Garik Sukachov =

Russian singer-songwriter (born 1959)

Garik Sukachov Гарик Сукачёв
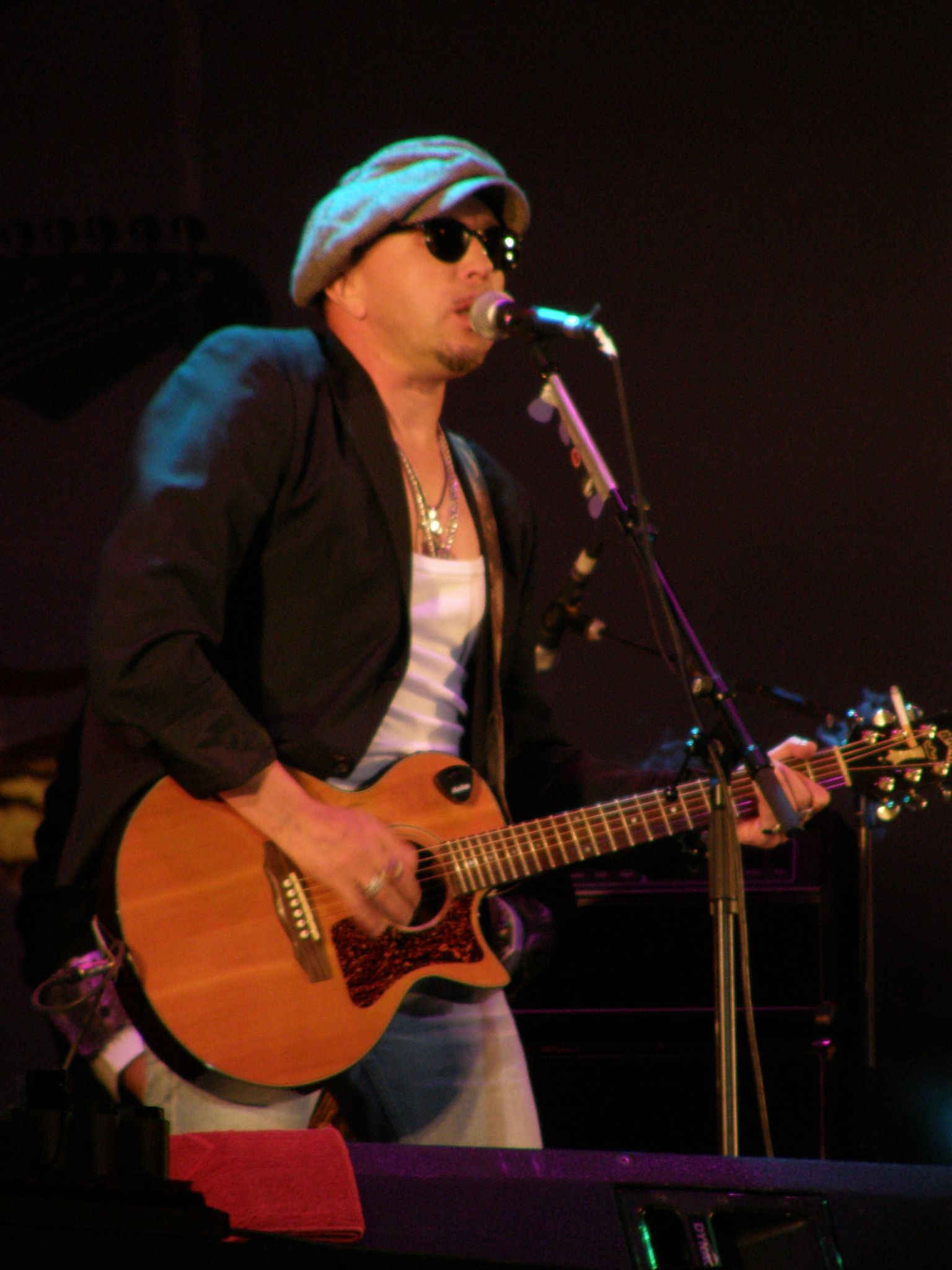
- Garik Sukachov in Donetsk (2010)

Background information
- Born: Igor Ivanovich Sukachov; 1 December 1959; Myakinino (Moscow Oblast), Russian SFSR, Soviet Union
- Genres: Folk rock, bard rock, Russian chanson, Gypsy punk
- Instrument: Guitar
- Years active: 1977—present
- Website: www.neprikasaemye.ru (in Russian)

Igor Ivanovich "Garik" Sukachov (Russian: И́горь Ива́нович (Га́рик) Сукачё́в; 1 December 1959) is a Russian musician, singer-songwriter, poet, actor, film director and TV presenter.

== Career ==
Igor Ivanovich Sukachov was born in the Moscow suburb village of Myakinino, shortly after his family moved to Tushino (now Moscow). His father fought in World War II, having fought throughout the war from Moscow to Berlin. His mother was a Nazi concentration camp survivor.

Having graduated the railway technical college, Sukachyov became a transport engineer and even took part in designing the Tushino railway station. In 1977 he formed the band Zakat Solntsa Vruchnuyu ("Sunset manually"), which, after the release of one album on tape, broke up in 1983. Also in 1983, with Evgeny Khavtan, Sukachyov created another band, Postscriptum, which released one album (Don't Give Up!, 1982) and after his departure in 1984 joined forces with singer Zhanna Aguzarova to become the group Bravo. Abrupt change of mind brought him to study theater at the Lipetsk Culture and Education College, which he graduated in 1987 with a theater director diploma.

In 1986 he formed Brigada S, the self-described 'proletarian jazz orchestra', with guitarist Sergey Galanin, whom he knew from his Lipetsk days. They released six studio albums, featured in Savva Kulish's film The Tragedy in Rock, toured the United States and, after two line-up changes involving Galanin's quitting and returning, disbanded in 1993. In 1989 Sukachyov co-organized the Rock Against Terror event alongside Alexander F. Sklyar, which featured a speech in the defense of the rights of sexual minorities, one of the first in the Soviet Union.

In 1994 Sukachyov formed Neprikasayemye, a more urban folk-oriented outfit, which released nine studio albums in 1994–2010. The band held massive tours across Russia and did several concerts with Emir Kusturica. Sukachov's solo career started in 1991; he released ten studio solo albums including My Vysotsky (2014). The melody of Sukachov's song "Napoi menia vodoi" ("Quench my thirst") was used in Robert Miles's 1995 song Children.

In 1988 Sukachov started his career in cinema, appearing in twenty films and directing three more himself, mostly in the 1990s. In 1999 Sukachyov published his first book, The King of the Boulevard (Korol prospekta), followed by Where the Rain Ends (Gde konchayetsa dozhd, 2001).

== Views ==
Sukachov publicly stated in December 2014 that he supports Russian separatists in the war in Donbas. In January 2015, he released an internet music video recorded to support the separatists. Ivan Okhlobystin, a Russian actor, and Alexander F. Sklyar, a Russian musician, also participated in the video. In 2022, he supported the Russian invasion of Ukraine.

== Discography ==
=== Brigada S ===
- 1988 — Добро пожаловать в запретную зону (Dobro pojalovat' v zapretnuyu zonu) - Welcome to the no-go zone
- 1989 - Ностальгическое танго (Nostal'gicheskoe tango) - Nostalgic tango
- 1991 — Аллергии — нет! (Allergii - net!) - Allergies - no!
- 1992 — Всё это рок-н-ролл (Vsyo eto rok-n-roll) - It's only rock and roll
- 1993 — Реки (Reki) - Rivers
- 1994 — Я обожаю jazz. Зэ бэст 1986-1989 (Ya odojayu jazz. The best 1986-1989) - I adore jazz. The best 1986-1989

=== Neprikasaemie ===
- 1994 — Брёл, брёл, брёл (Bryol, bryol, bryol) - Walked, walked, walked
- 1995 — Между водой и огнём (Mejdu vodoy i ognyom) - Between water and fire
- 1999 — Города, где после дождя дымится асфальт (Goroda, gde posle dojdya dymitsa asfalt) - The cities where asphalt is smoking after raining
- 1999 — Барышня и дракон (Barishnia i drakon) - Lady and the Dragon
- 2002 — Ночной полёт (Nochnoi polyot) - Night flight
- 2005 — Третья чаша (Tretya chasha) - The third cup
- 2006 — Оборотень с гитарой (Oboroten' s gitaroi) - The Werewolf with a guitar
- 2010 — 5:0 в мою пользу (Pyat'-nol' v moyu pol'zu) - I'm 5:0

=== Solo Projects ===
- 1991 — Акция Нонсенс (Aktsiya Nonsens) - Action Nonsense
- 1995 — Боцман и бродяга. Я милого узнаю по походке (Botsman i brodyaga. Ya milogo uznayu po pohodke) - Boatswain and a tramp. I recognize the sweet in his walk (with Alexandr F. Sklyar)
- 1996 — Песни с окраины (Pesni s okrainy) - Songs from the outskirts
- 1998 — Кризис среднего возраста (Krizis srednego vozrasta) - Midlife crisis
- 1999 — Барышня и дракон (Barishnia i drakon) - Lady and the Dragon
- 2001 — Фронтовой альбом (Frontovoy al'bom) - Frontline album
- 2003 — Poetica (Poetica) - Poetica
- 2003 — 44 (Sorok chetyre) - 44
- 2005 — Перезвоны (Perezvony) - Chimes

== TV ==
- "Besedka" (The Arbor), on Channel One (Russia), 1992.

== Cinema ==
=== As director and screenwriter ===
- 1997 - Кризис среднего возраста (Krizis srednego vozrasta) - Midlife crisis
- 2001 - Праздник (Prazdnik) - The Holiday
- 2010 - Дом Солнца (Dom Sontsa) - The House of the Sun

=== As actor ===
Sukachov has acted in over films. The following is a selection of the most famous:

- 1988 - The tragedy in the style of rock (Трагедия в стиле рок - Tragediya v stile rok)
- 1991 - Lost in Siberia (Потерянный в Сибири - Poteryannyy v Sibiri)
- 2004 - Arie (Арье - Arie)
- 2005 - Dead Man's Bluff (Жмурки - Zhmurki)
- 2010 - The House of the Sun (Дом Cолнца - Dom Solntsa)
- 2017 Bird (Птица - Ptitsa)

Sukachov also writes scores for animated movies and foreign films.
