= The Blue Notebook =

1963 Soviet film

- Russian: Синяя тетрадь
- Directed by: Lev Kulidzhanov
- Written by: Lev Kulidzhanov
- Starring: Pavel Kadochnikov; Nonna Terentyeva; Zinaida Kirienko; Anatoli Barchuk; Marina Burova
- Cinematography: Igor Shatrov
- Music by: Mikhail Ziv
- Release date: 1963
- Running time: 95 minutes
- Country: Soviet Union
- Language: Russian

The Blue Notebook (Russian: Синяя тетрадь) is a 1963 Soviet drama film directed by Lev Kulidzhanov.

The film takes place in the summer of 1917. Vladimir Lenin leaves Petrograd and, together with Grigory Zinoviev, hides in a hut in Razliv. There he begins work on his famous The Blue Notebook, realizing that revolution is necessary for Russia.

== Plot ==
In the summer of 1917, Vladimir Lenin and Grigory Zinoviev go into hiding from the authorities of the Russian Provisional Government in a hut near the Sestroretsky Razliv lake. Disguised as mowers under the protection of the Bolshevik Yemelyanov family, they continue their discussions on the future of the revolution, debating the correctness of their chosen political strategy and the prospects for Russia's development. The film portrays Zinoviev not as a secondary figure, as often depicted, but as a respected Bolshevik leader with his own perspective and truth, admired by Lenin. Their secluded refuge becomes a meeting place for visits from Central Committee members such as Yakov Sverdlov, Felix Dzerzhinsky, and Sergo Ordzhonikidze, adding to the intense political discourse.

A significant element of the narrative is Lenin's "Blue Notebook," delivered to him by comrades. This notebook contains his seminal work, The State and Revolution, in which Lenin develops the theoretical foundations of his vision for the state—a vision he would soon attempt to implement. The film emphasizes the intellectual and ideological work that took place during Lenin's time in hiding, highlighting the gravity of his ideas and their eventual impact on the revolutionary movement.

The story concludes with Lenin's departure from Razliv as he escapes to Finland. There, he finds shelter in the house of a police officer sympathetic to the revolution, marking the next phase in his efforts to lead the Bolshevik cause to victory.

== Cast ==
- Mikhail Kuznetsov as V.I. Lenin
- Mark Nikelberg as Zinovyev
- Nikolay Lebedev as Nikolay Aleksandrovich Emelyanov
- Aleksandr Paleev as Sverdlov
- Vasiliy Livanov as Dzherzhinsky
- Boris Tokarev as Kondratiy
- Vitaly Churkin as Kolya Yemelyanov
- Boris Tokarev as Kondratiy Yemelyanov
- Anatoliy Antosevich as Aleksandr Yemelyanov
- Vitaliy Matveev as Aleksey
