= Averchenko =

Averchenko is a gender-neutral Slavic surname. Notable people with the surname include:

- Arkady Averchenko (1881–1925), Russian playwright and satirist
- Evgeniy Averchenko (born 1982), Kazakh footballer
- Jordan Averchenko (born 1993), British guitarist, multi instrumentalist.
