= Brigada S =

Soviet-Russian rock band

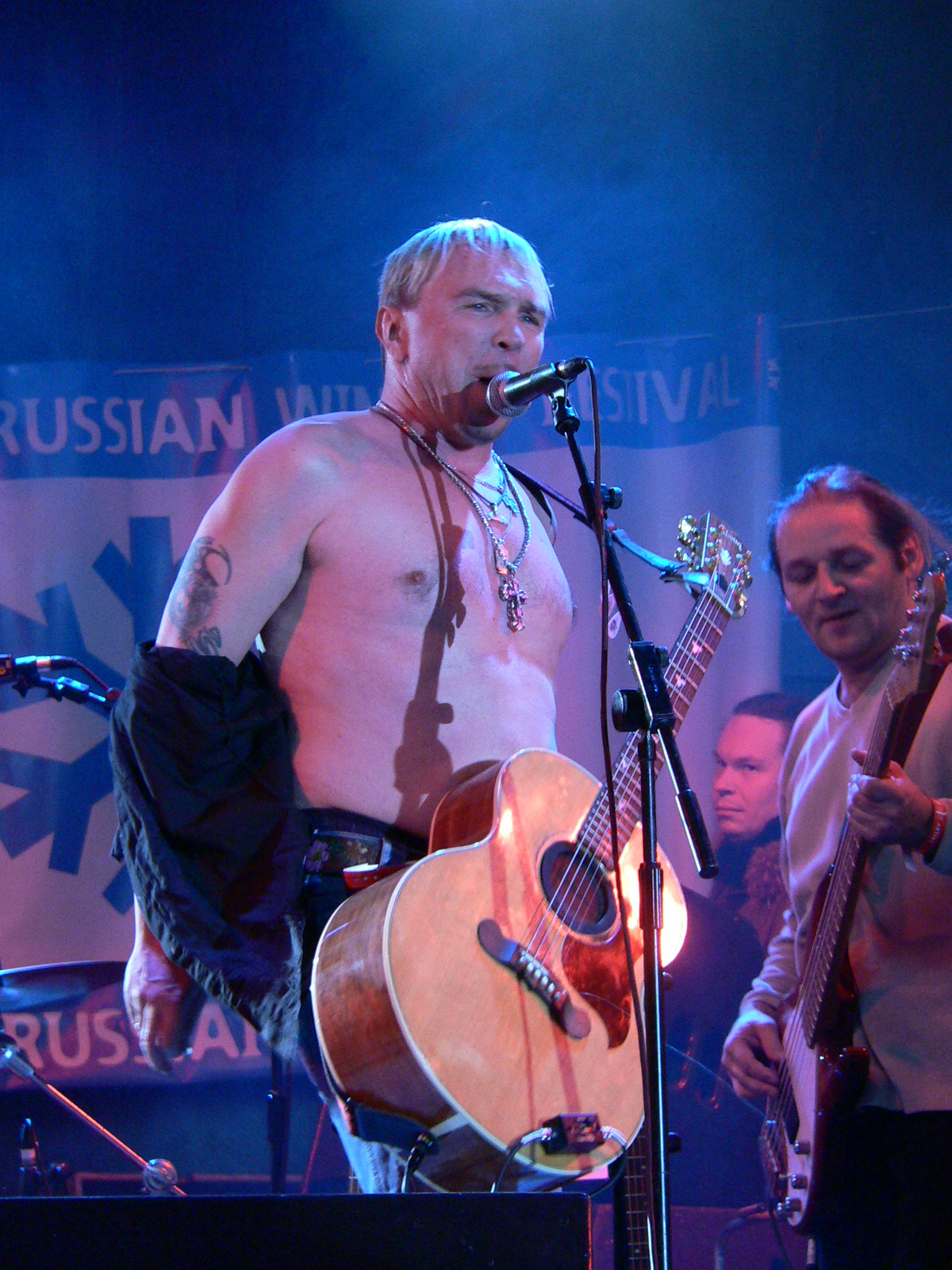
- Sukachov. Russian Winter Festival. London, 2007

Background information
- Origin: (Russia) Moscow
- Genres: Alternative rock, funk rock, jazz rock, Swing punk
- Years active: 1984–1993
- Labels: Fili Records
- Past members: Garik Sukachov, Sergey Galanin, Alexander Goryachev, Kirill Trusov, Lev Andreyev, Karen Sarkisov, Igor Yartsev, Leonid Chelyapov, Igor Markov, Yevgeny Korotkov, Maxim Likhachyov

Brigada S (Брига́да С) was a Soviet/Russian rock band fronted by Garik Sukachov which played dynamic mix of rough rock and roll, reggae and rhythm and blues marked by the effective use of the brass section. Formed in 1984 the self-described "proletarian jazz orchestra" released five albums (first two on tape), toured the United States (1988) and appeared in Savva Kulish's film The Tragedy in Rock (1988). In 1989 the participated in the Moscow Music Peace Festival which brought hard rock and metal acts from the United States and Europe to perform alongside Russian bands. They broke up in 1993. After the band's demise, Garik Sukachov went on to front Neprikasayemye (The Untouchables), while guitarist Sergey Galanin formed SerGa.

== The original line-up ==
- Garik Sukachov - vocals, acoustic guitar
- Sergey Galanin - bass guitar, backing vocals
- Alexander Goryachev - guitar
- Lev Andreyev - keyboards
- Karen Sarkisov - percussion
- Igor Yartsev - drums
- Leonid Chelyapov - saxophone
- Igor Markov - trumpet
- Yevgeny Korotkov - trumpet
- Maxim Likhachyov - trombone

== Discography ==
- Добро пожаловать в запретную зону (Welcome to the Forbidden Zone, 1988, tape)
- Ностальгическое танго (The Nostalgic Tango, 1989)
- Аллергии — нет! (Say No! to Allergy, 1991)
- Всё это рок-н-ролл (All This Is Rock and Roll, 1991)
- Реки (Rivers, 1993)
