= Nina Urgant =

Soviet and Russian actress (1929–2021)

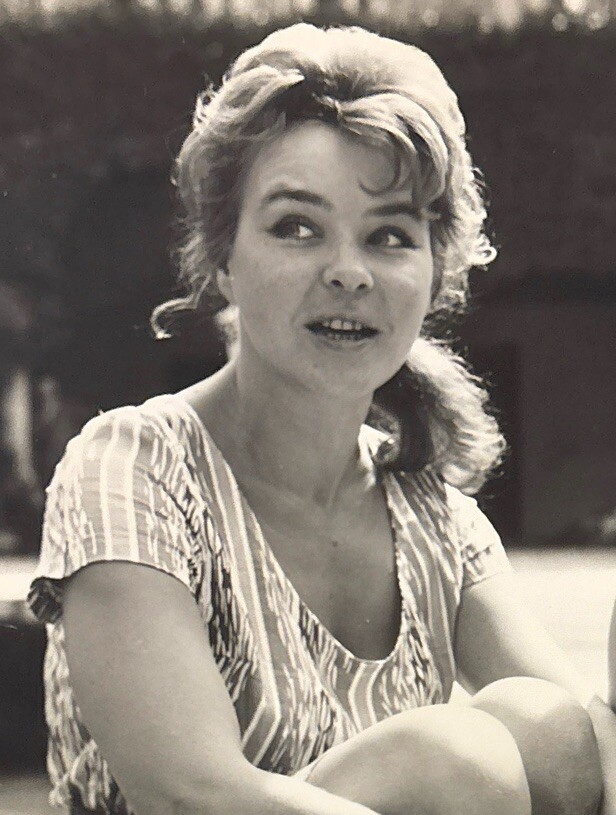
- Urgant in 1962
- Born: Nina Nikolayevna Urgant; 4 September 1929; Luga, Leningrad Oblast, RSFSR, Soviet Union
- Died: 3 December 2021 (aged 92); Saint Petersburg, Russia
- Occupation: Actress
- Years active: 1953–2008

Nina Nikolayevna Urgant (Russian: Ни́на Никола́евна У́ргант; 4 September 1929 – 3 December 2021) was a Soviet and Russian film and stage actress. She was granted the honor of People's Artist of the RSFSR in 1974.

== Family ==
- Father — Nikolai Andreyevich Urgant, Estonian, People's Commissariat of Internal Affairs officer.
- Mother — Maria Petrovna Urgant, Ukrainian.

The family had four children: two brothers and two sisters.

- Her first husband — actor Lev Milinder
  - Son — actor Andrey Urgant
    - Grandson — TV presenter Ivan Urgant
      - Great-granddaughter Nina
      - Great granddaughter Valeria
    - Granddaughter, Maria, lives in the Netherlands,
      - Great grandson Emir, lives in the Netherlands,
- Second husband — actor Gennady Voropayev.
- Third husband — choreographer Kirill Laskari.

== Selected filmography ==
- 1954 — Tamer of Tigers as Olechka Mikhailova
- 1955 — Twelfth Night as maidservant
- 1957 — Street Full of Surprises as resting in Peterhof park
- 1958 — There Were Soldiers ... as Widow
- 1959 — The Overcoat as lady of easy virtue
- 1960 — Be Careful, Grandma! as Alexandra
- 1962 — Introduction to Life as Volodya's mother
- 1963 — Meet Baluyev! as Dusya Baluyeva
- 1964 — Mother and Stepmother as Katherina
- 1965 — Sultry July as Barbara
- 1966 — I Come from Childhood as Lucy
- 1967 — Retribution as Sima Suvorova
- 1967 — War under the Roofs as Anna Mikhailovna
- 1970 — Belorussian Station as Raisa, former nurse
- 1975 — Bonus as Dina
- 1975 — For the Rest of His Life as Aunt Laundry
- 1976 — Family Celebration Day as Daria Stepanovna
- 1976 — Long, Long Business as Maria Ivanovna Stroganova, mother of Kirill
- 1976 — Days of the Surgeon Mishkin as Marina Vasilievna, head physician
- 1976 — Own Opinion as Olympiada
- 1977 — Open Book as Tanya's Mother
- 1978 — The Handsome Man as Apollinaria
- 1980 — Family Circle as Medvedeva
- 1981 — Girl and Grand as Marina's mother
- 1982 — Solar Wind as Lyubov Vasilievna
- 1984 — Time for Rest from Saturday to Monday as ship passengers
- 1985 — Sunday Dad as Nina Sergeevna
- 1988 — Weekdays and Holidays of Serafima Glukina as Maria Grigoryevna
- 2005 — Streets of Broken Lights 6 as Elena Petrovna
- 2006 — Russian Money as Anfisa Tikhonova
- 2008 — Asian as Oshkinchiha
