= Meet Baluyev! =

1963 film

- Directed by: Victor Komissarjevski
- Written by: Vadim Kozhevnikov
- Produced by: I. Goldin
- Starring: Ivan Pereverzev
- Cinematography: Veniamin Levitin; Dmitry Meskhiev
- Edited by: Zinaida Sheineman
- Music by: Vladlen Chistyakov
- Production company: Lenfilm
- Release date: 7 July 1963
- Running time: 101 minutes
- Country: Soviet Union
- Language: Russian

Meet Baluyev! (Russian: Знакомьтесь, Балуев!, translit. Znakomtes, Baluyev!) is a 1963 Soviet drama film directed by Victor Komissarjevski and based on a 1960 novel by Vadim Kozhevnikov. It was entered into the 3rd Moscow International Film Festival.

== Plot ==
Set in the 1960s, the film follows Pavel Gavrilovich Baluyev, the head of a construction site for a major gas pipeline. Baluyev decides to deviate from the approved project and lay the pipeline directly through a swamp, prioritizing efficiency over protocol. In addition to his primary responsibilities as a manager and leader, Baluyev actively engages in mentoring and educating his subordinates.

== Cast ==
- Ivan Pereverzev as Pavel Gavrilovich Baluyev
- Nina Urgant as Dusya Baluyeva
- Stanislav Sokolov as Vitya Zaitsev
- Zinaida Kiriyenko as Kapa Podgornaya
- Anatoli Romashin as Boris Shpakovsky
- Sergei Plotnikov as Bubnov
- Pantelejmon Krymov as machinist Petukhov
- Pavel Morozenko as Vasya Marchenko
- Pavel Pankov as Fyodor Fokin
- Sergei Blinnikov as Alexey Firsov
- Igor Kosukhin as Seva Krokhalev
- Nikolai Kuzmin as Betbulatov
- Nelly Korneva as Izolda Bezuglova
- Aleksei Smirnov as restaurant visitor
