= Boris Tokarev (actor) =

Russian actor, film director and screenplay writer

- Born: Boris Vasilyevich Tokarev; August 20, 1947 (age 79); Kiselyovo, Kaluga Oblast, RSFSR, USSR
- Occupations: actor, film director
- Years active: from 1959
- Spouse: Lyudmila Gladunko

Boris Vasilyevich Tokarev (Russian: Борис Васильевич Токарев) is a Soviet and Russian actor, film director and screenplay writer. He is a Meritorious Artist of RSFSR.

== Biography ==
Boris Tokarev was born in the village of Kiselyovo, Kaluga Oblast, USSR. Some years later the family moved to Moscow where Boris entered school.

When Boris was 12 years old when he made his debut in cinema. He played Victor in Georgy Pobedonostsev's film "The Rescued Generation". When he was 13 he was invited to Pushkin's Theatre, accepting a role in a play.

As a schoolboy, Boris acted in some films. While he was a student of Gerasimov Institute of Cinematography, he took part in some more films such as: "The Way to a Sea", "The Sixth Summer", "Faithfulness".

After graduation Boris Tokarev joined the Theatre of the Soviet Army. However, he worked there just a year as he mostly liked cinema.

== Private life ==
Working under the film " Where Are You Now, Maxim?" Boris Tokarev got acquainted with actress Lyudmila Gladunko and she became his wife in 1969. Boris and Lyudmila have son Stepan.

== Filmography ==
=== Actor ===
1. 1959 — The Rescued Generation as Victor
2. 1963 — The Blue Notebook as Kondratiy
3. 1963 — Introduction to Life as Volodya
4. 1964 — Where Are You Now, Maxim? as Maxim
5. 1964 — Chamber as Misha Novikov
6. 1965 — Faithfulness as lieutenant
7. 1965 — The Way to a Sea as Tolya
8. 1967 — The Sixth Summer as Kostya Lapin
9. 1969 — Prince Igor as Prince Vladimir
10. 1970 — Sea Character as Andrei Korotkikh
11. 1971 — If You Are A Man... as Pashka Snegiryov
12. 1971 — Stolen Train as Rubashkin
13. 1972 — The Dawns Here Are Quiet… as Osyanin, Rita's husband
14. 1976 — The Two Captains as Sania Grigoriev
15. 1973 — High Rank as Pavel Shapovalov
16. 1973 — Hot Snow as Lieutenant Nikolai Kuznetsov
17. 1975 — From Dawn Till Sunset as Motya Zakharov
18. 1975 — We Didn't Pass it as Yuri Aleksandrovich Ryabinin
19. 1979 — Gwiazdy Poranne - Mikhail Lavrov, tank commander
20. 1981 — Little Alexander as Captain Igor Tsvetov
21. 1985 — Coasts in the Fog as Voronov
22. 1985 — Attention! To All Posts... as Sergey
23. 1990 — Goal in the Spassky Gate as Alexander Shelepin
24. 1991 — Recruiter as policeman Rodin
25. 1996 — President and his woman as Gleb
26. 1999 — Dossier of Detective Dubrovsky as MP Voitov
27. 2000 — Maroseyka, 12 as Listvyanik
28. 2001 — Don't Leave Me, Love as Oleg Zubarev
29. 2003 — My Prechistenka as Prince Repin
30. 2005 — Major Pugachev's Last Fight as Major General Artemyev
31. 2007 — The Apocalypse Code as FSB officer
32. 2007 — Emergency Call. Extra Witness as Artyom Nikolaevich Mamaev
33. 2018 — Dinosaur as retired investigator

=== Director ===
1. 1982 — We Weren't Married in Church
2. 1985 — Vosstaniya Square
3. 1987 — The Night Crew
4. 1992 — The Hermit
5. 2001 — Don't Leave Me, Love
6. 2003 — My Prechistenka
7. 2009 — The Distance
8. 2012 — Soothsayer Omar Khayyam. Chronicle of a Legend

=== Writer ===
1. 1985 — Vosstaniya Square
