= Kiva Maidanik =

Kiva Maidanik (in Russian Кива Львович Майданик, or Kiva Livovich Maidanik, January 13, 1929, Moscow – December 24, 2006) was a Soviet historian and political scientist, a researcher at the Institute of World Economy and International Relations of the Russian Academy of Sciences. He worked in Latin American studies, with interest in Cuba, Brazil, Nicaragua, Mexico, and Venezuela. In 1980–87 he was expelled from the Communist Party of the USSR for "unauthorised contacts with foreigners."

== Bibliography ==
=== Books by Kiva Maidanik ===
- Испанский пролетариат в национально-революционной войне 1936–1937 гг. М.: Издательство Академии Наук СССР, 1960.
- Эрнесто Че Гевара: его жизни, его Америка. М.: Ad Marginem, 2004. ISBN 5-93321-081-1

=== Books about Kiva Maidanik ===
- Isa Conde N. Kiva Maidanik: Humanidad sin límites y herejía revolucionaria. Santo Domingo (Republica Dominicana): Editora Tropical, 2007.
