= Vasily Shumov =

Russian-American musician (born 1960)

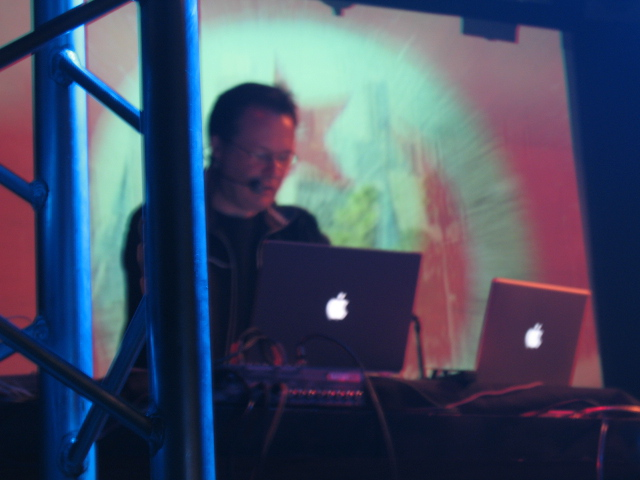
- Vasily Shumov live with Center in Moscow, Russia on 17 November 2006

Background information
- Born: Vasily Gerardovich Shumov; 23 March 1960 (age 66); Moscow, Russia, Russian Federation
- Genres: New wave, electronic music, avantgarde, sprechgesang
- Occupations: Musician, artist, songwriter, record producer, director
- Instrument: Vocals
- Member of: Center

Vasily Gerardovich Shumov (Russian: Василий Герардович Шумов; born 23 March 1960) is a Russian-American artist, musician, multimedia and experimental artist, short film director and record producer. He is probably best known for his music band Center, which was formed in Soviet Union (late 1970s - late 1980s) and has been based in Los Angeles since 1990. Shumov created music in genres such as new wave, electronic music, and avantgarde. His art of singing is often sprechgesang, especially on later albums.

== Personal life ==
Vasily Shumov is the son of Maria Evlakhova and Gerard Shumov. With his first wife he had a son Anton. With his second wife, Judith he had two children, Angelica and Nikolai.

== Career ==
Vasily Shumov's career as a musician, producer and songwriter took start in late 1970s, in the USSR. He organised the rock'n'roll band to play underground music at the local dancing venue of the Moscow suburbs of Korolyov. In early 80s the band, called Center, became extremely popular among youth audience across the former Soviet empire, together with other groups of the "rock and roll revival" scene. Until 1990, Vasily Shumov was occupied both with his career as a frontman of Center and solo (albums, soundtracks, TV and radio, direction and music production for the fellow musicians, like Zvuki Mu). In 1990 Shumov moved to Los Angeles (California, United States), where he lived with his family. He was frequenting Russia, although "the Moscow Times" newspaper featured his "comeback concert" as the only one for the recent eight years (2006) In LA Vasily shot movies and created numerous multimedia art projects, he experimented with innovative ways of music releasing and label production by means of the internet technologies, he also lectured on multimedia art, design and computer.

During the first years of the century, Shumov is coordinating the "c-e-n-t-e-r" project, resulted with a series of episodes, where experimental music and videos of many different performers have been combined. The so-called centroborators were contributing for this project through the http and ftp protocols. A movie "Kelton's Dark Corner" (starring Paul Marco, directed by Vasily Shumov) was released in January 2006. But Paul Marco, who is probably best known for the Ed Wood's 1950s films, died during the production, so the planned "Dark Corner" series were never finished

In 2012, Shumov has an idea to create the "Russian White Album", a collection of tracks donated by their copywriters for free. The project was a brainchild of Shumov (rus) The protest anti-Putin set of tracks was described by Shumov himself as a columnist for rbth.com news website (eng)

== Discography ==
=== Solo albums ===
- 1986 My District (Мой район)
- 1990 Время три (Time Three)
- 1992 Шумовидение. Песни Живых и Мертвых (Noisevision. Songs of living and dead)
- 1992 Тектоника(к) (Tectonics)
- 1994 Голливудский Василек (Vasilyok of Hollywood)
- 1997 Короли поэзии в трансе (Kings of Poetry in Trance)
- 1998 Концерт в программе «Живая коллекция» (c группой «НТО Рецепт») (Concert in «Live Collection» broadcast)
- 2000 Музыка к 4 фильмам (music for 4 films)
- 2000 Играй сам себя (Play Itself)
- 2001 Анагра (Аналоговое Гражданство) (Anagra. Analogous Citizenship)
