= Center (band) =

Soviet and Russian rock band

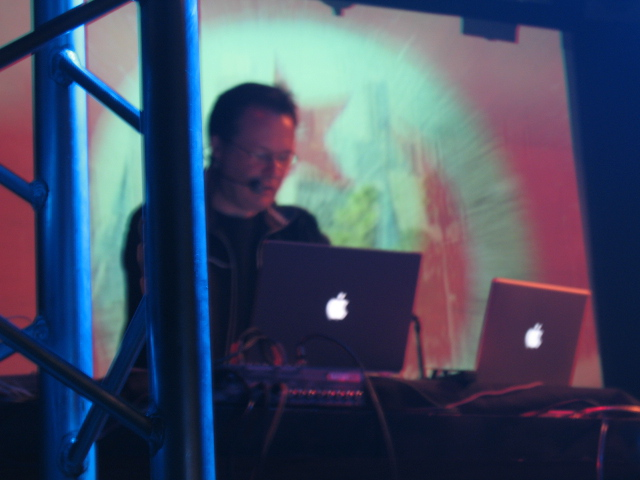
- Vasily Shumov live with Center in Moscow, November 17, 2006

Background information
- Origin: Moscow, Soviet Union, Russia
- Genres: New wave, electronic music, indie rock, post-punk, garage rock, psychedelic rock, alternative rock
- Years active: 1980–1989; 1995–2013
- Members: Vasily Shumov, Valery Vinogradov, Evgeny Ilnitsky, Alexey Vinogradov, Edvard Bekket
- Past members: Vladimir Kuzmin, Alexandr F. Sklyar, Alexey Loktev, Karen Sarkisov, Fast Freddie, Andrey Shnitke; Alexandr Vasilyev and many others

Center (or Tsentr, Russian: Центр) is a Russian-speaking band, which can be described as eclectic and experimental. The styles of their music are very different, starting with new wave and Russian rock in the early years, crossing over to electronica.

Center was founded by Vasily Shumov in Moscow, Russia in the late 1970s. The first band name was "777". In the early 1980s Center became popular in the Soviet music underground. The band released over 25 albums, created music for films and TV, appeared on TV shows, and performed in Europe and America. Center is documented in numerous publications and books.

In the 1990s, the band leader Shumov moved from Moscow, Russia to Los Angeles, United States where he continued his music and art work.

An album "Plastikozamenitel'" ("Plastic substitute") from 2000 is the first release of Center that features the new concept of so-called Centroborators. Centroborators are the artists from various locations, who contribute to the albums of Center, transferring their digital recordings to Vasily Shumov's studio using internet. Several albums after "Plastikozamenitel" were created using the Centroborators concept.
