= 48th César Awards =

Awards ceremony

- Official poster featuring Marion Cotillard in Annette (2021)
- Date: 24 February 2023
- Site: Olympia, Paris
- Hosted by: Emmanuelle Devos, Léa Drucker, Eye Haïdara, Leïla Bekhti, Jérôme Commandeur, Ahmed Sylla, Jamel Debbouze, Alex Lutz and Raphaël Personnaz

Highlights
- Best Film: The Night of the 12th
- Best Actor: Benoît Magimel; Pacifiction
- Best Actress: Virginie Efira; Paris Memories
- Most awards: The Night of the 12th (6)
- Most nominations: The Innocent (11)

Television coverage
- Network: Canal+

The 48th César Awards ceremony, presented by the Académie des Arts et Techniques du Cinéma, took place on 24 February 2023 at the Olympia in Paris, to honour the best French films of 2022. Actor Tahar Rahim presided over the ceremony, which was hosted by actors Emmanuelle Devos, Léa Drucker, Eye Haïdara, Leïla Bekhti, Jérôme Commandeur, Ahmed Sylla, Jamel Debbouze, Alex Lutz and Raphaël Personnaz. American director David Fincher received the Honorary César.

The nominations were announced on 25 January 2023, with the drama film The Innocent leading with eleven nominations, followed by The Night of the 12th with ten and Pacifiction and Rise, both with nine. The Night of the 12th went on to win six awards, more than any other film in the ceremony, including Best Film.

Marion Cotillard was featured in the official poster for the ceremony in a still from the 2021 film Annette. The Césars also released an animated poster with a scene of Cotillard singing in Annette.

== Winners and nominees ==
The nominees were announced on 25 January 2023.

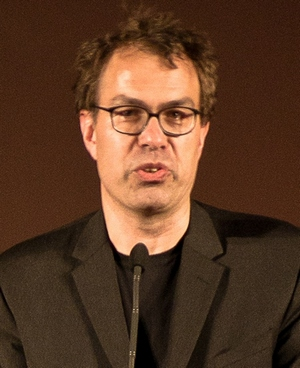
Dominik Moll, Best Director winner.

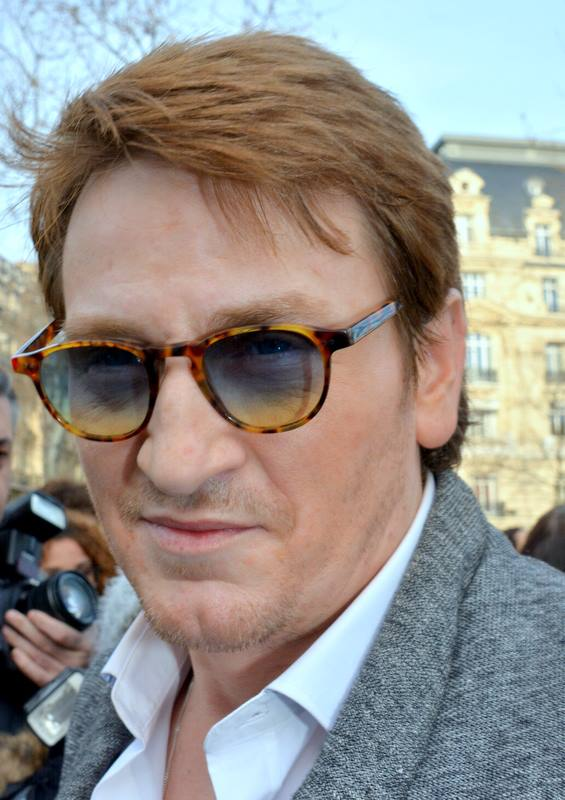
Benoît Magimel, Best Actor winner.

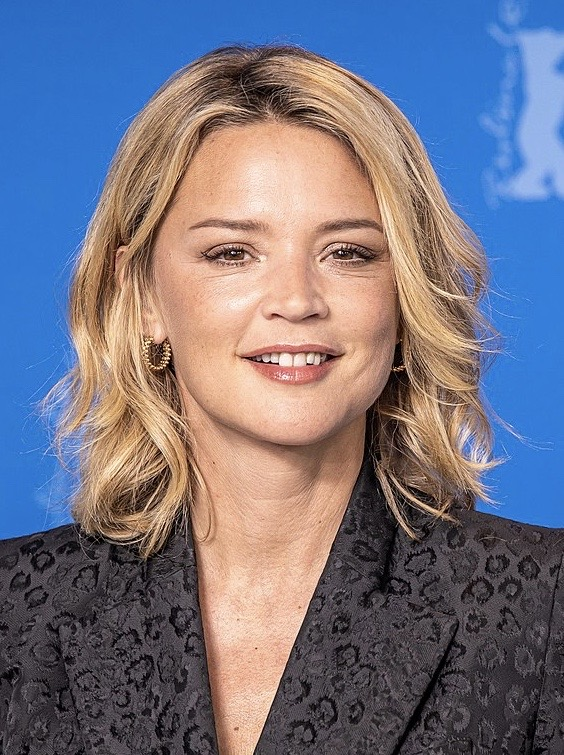
Virginie Efira, Best Actress winner.

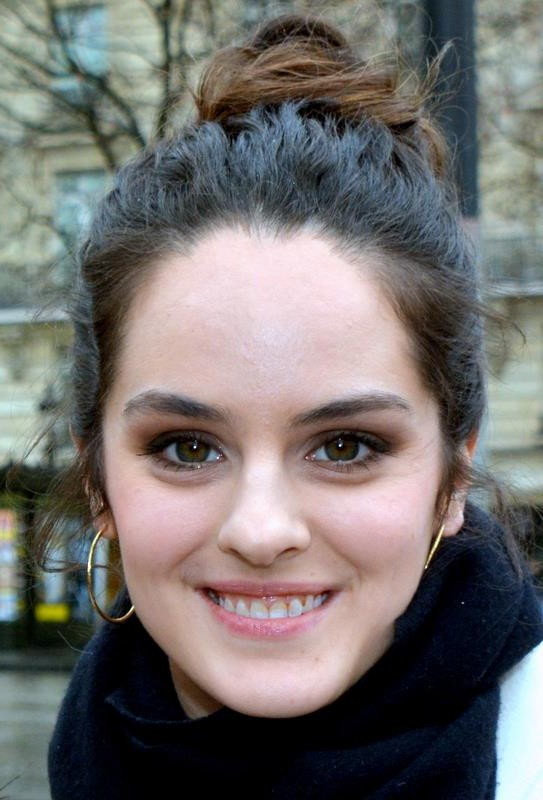
Noémie Merlant, Best Supporting Actress winner.

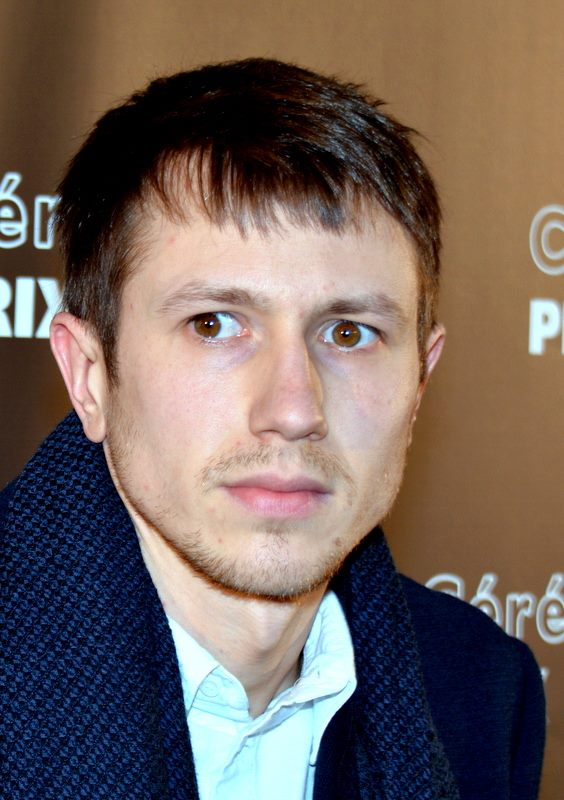
Bastien Bouillon, Most Promising Actor winner.

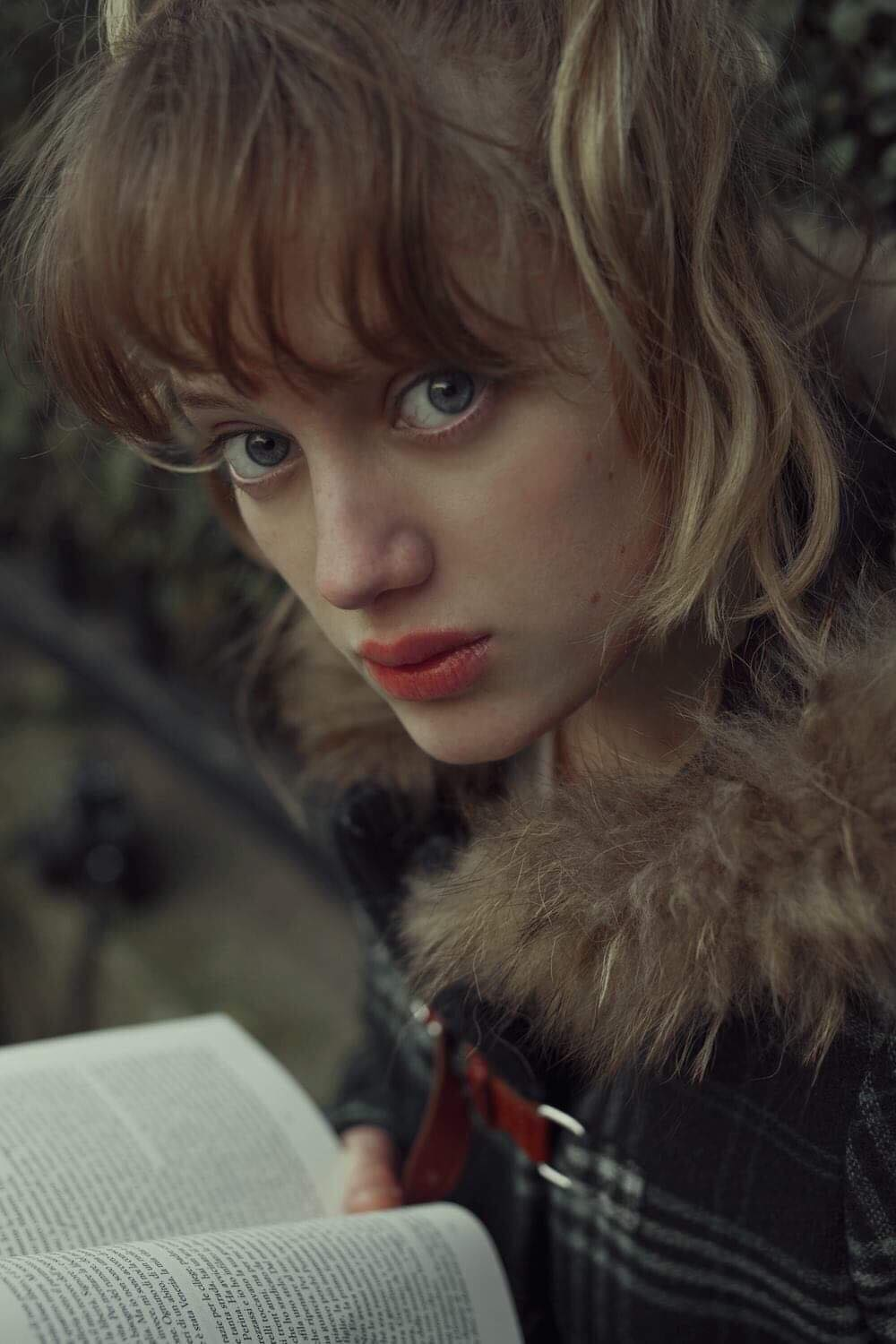
Nadia Tereszkiewicz, Most Promising Actress winner.

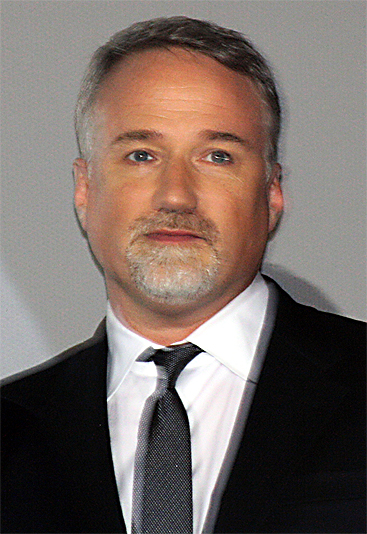
David Fincher, Honorary César recipient.

Best Film: The Night of the 12th – Produced by Caroline Benjo, Barbara Letellier, Carole Scotta, Simon Arnal; Directed by Dominik Moll; Forever Young – Produced by Alexandra Henochsberg, Patrick Sobelman; Directed by Valeria Bruni Tedeschi; Rise – Produced by Bruno Levy; Directed by Cédric Klapisch; The Innocent – Produced by Anne-Dominique Toussaint; Directed by Louis Garrel; Pacifiction – Produced by Pierre-Olivier Bardet; Directed by Albert Serra	Best Director: Dominik Moll – The Night of the 12th; Cedric Klapisch – Rise; Louis Garrel – The Innocent; Cédric Jimenez – November; Albert Serra – Pacifiction
Best Actor: Benoît Magimel – Pacifiction as De Roller; Jean Dujardin – November as Fred; Louis Garrel – The Innocent as Abel; Vincent Macaigne – Diary of a Fleeting Affair as Simon; Denis Ménochet – Peter von Kant as Peter Von Kant	Best Actress: Virginie Efira – Paris Memories as Mia; Fanny Ardant – The Young Lovers as Shauna Loszinsky; Juliette Binoche – Between Two Worlds as Marianne Winckler; Laure Calamy – Full Time as Julie Roy; Adèle Exarchopoulos – Zero Fucks Given as Cassandre
Best Supporting Actor: Bouli Lanners – The Night of the 12th as Marceau; François Civil – Rise as Yann; Micha Lescot – Forever Young as Pierre Romans; Pio Marmaï – Rise as Loïc; Roschdy Zem – The Innocent as Michel	Best Supporting Actress: Noémie Merlant – The Innocent as Clemence; Judith Chemla – The Sixth Child as Meriem; Anaïs Demoustier – November as Ines; Anouk Grinberg – The Innocent as Sylvie; Lyna Khoudri – November as Samia
Most Promising Actor: Bastien Bouillon – The Night of the 12th as Yohan Vivès; Stéfan Crepon – Peter von Kant as Karl; Dimitri Doré – Bruno Reidal as Bruno Reidal; Paul Kircher – Winter Boy as Lucas Ronis; Aliocha Reinert – Softie as Johnny	Most Promising Actress: Nadia Tereszkiewicz – Forever Young as Stella; Marion Barbeau – Rise as Élise; Guslagie Malanda – Saint Omer as Laurence Coly; Rebecca Marder – A Radiant Girl as Irène; Mallory Wanecque – The Worst Ones as Lily
Best Original Screenplay: The Innocent – Louis Garrel, Tanguy Viel, Naïla Guiguet; Full Time – Eric Gravel; Forever Young – Valeria Bruni Tedeschi, Noémie Lvovsky, Agnes de Sacy; Rise – Cedric Klapisch, Santiago Amigorena; Saint Omer – Alice Diop, Amrita David, Marie NDiaye	Best Adaptation: The Night of the 12th – Gilles Marchand, Dominik Moll; based on the non-fiction book 18.3 – Une année à la PJ by Pauline Guéna; Final Cut – Michel Hazanavicius; based on the film One Cut of the Dead written by Shin'ichirō Ueda; Enquête sur un scandale d'État – Thierry de Peretti, Jeanne Aptekman; based on the book L'Infiltré by Hubert Avoine and Emmanuel Fansten
Best First Film: Saint Omer – Produced by Toufik Ayadi, Christophe Barral; Directed by Alice Diop; Bruno Reidal – Produced by Thierry Lounas, Roy Arida, Pierre-Emmanuel Urcun; Directed by Vincent Le Port; Falcon Lake – Produced by David Gauquié, Julien Deris, Jean-Luc Ormieres, Jalil Lespert; Directed by Charlotte Le Bon; The Worst Ones – Produced by Marine Alaric, Frédéric Jouve; Directed by Lise Akoka, Romane Gueret; The Sixth Child – Produced by Frédéric Brillion, Gilles Legrand; Directed by Léopold Legrand	Best Cinematography: Pacifiction – Artur Tort; Forever Young – Julien Poupard; Rise – Alexis Kavyrchine; The Night of the 12th – Patrick Ghiringhelli; Saint Omer – Claire Mathon
Best Editing: Full Time – Mathilde van de Moortel; Rise – Anne-Sophie Bion; The Innocent – Pierre Deschamps; November – Laure Gardette; The Night of the 12th – Laurent Rouan	Best Sound: The Night of the 12th – François Maurel, Olivier Mortier, Luc Thomas; Rise – Cyril Moisson, Nicolas Moreau, Cyril Holtz; The Innocent – Laurent Benaim, Alexis Meynet, Olivier Guillaume; November – Cedric Deloche, Alexis Place, Gwennole Le Borgne, Marc Doisne; Pacifiction – Jordi Ribas, Benjamin Laurent, Bruno Tarriere
Best Original Music: Full Time – Irène Drésel; Final Cut – Alexandre Desplat; The Innocent – Grégoire Hetzel; The Night of the 12th – Olivier Marguerit; Pacifiction – Marc Verdaguer, Joe Robinson; The Passengers of the Night – Anton Sanko	Best Costume Design: Simone Veil, A Woman of the Century – Gigi Lepage; Forever Young – Caroline de Vivaise; The Colours of Fire – Pierre-Jean Larroque; Waiting for Bojangles – Emmanuelle Youchnovski; The Innocent – Corinne Bruand; Pacifiction – Praxedes de Vilallonga
Best Production Design: Simone Veil, A Woman of the Century – Christian Marti; Forever Young – Emmanuelle Duplay; The Colours of Fire – Sebastian Birchler; The Night of the 12th – Michel Barthelemy; Pacifiction – Sebastian Vogler	Best Documentary Film: Retour à Reims (Fragments) – Produced by Marie-Ange Luciani; Directed by Jean-Gabriel Périot; Allons Enfants – Produced by Stéphanie Schorter, Thierry Demaizière, Alban Teurlai, Romain Icard; Directed by Thierry Demaizière, Alban Teurlai; Les Années Super 8 – Produced by David Thion, Philippe Martin; Directed by Annie Ernaux, David Ernaux-Briot; Heart of Oak – Produced by Barthélémy Fougea, Michel Seydoux; Directed by Laurent Charbonnier, Michel Seydoux; Jane by Charlotte – Produced by Matthieu Ageron, Maxime Delauney, Romain Rousseau, Charlotte Gainsbourg; Directed by Charlotte Gainsbourg
Best Animated Feature Film: My Sunny Maad – Produced by Ron Dyens; Directed by Michaela Pavlátová; Ernest & Celestine: A Trip to Gibberitia – Produced by Damien Brunner, Didier Brunner; Directed by Jean-Christophe Roger, Julien Chheng; Little Nicholas: Happy As Can Be – Produced by Aton Soumache; Directed by Amandine Fredon, Benjamin Massoubre	Best Animated Short Film: La Vie Sexuelle de Mamie – Olivier Catherin, Edwina Liard, Nidia Santiago; Directed by Urška Djukić, Émilie Pigeard; Caline – Produced by Margot Reumont; Directed by Benoît Ayraud; Noir-Soleil – Produced by Nicolas de Rosanbo, Céline Vanlint; Directed by Marie Larrivé
Best Fiction Short Film: Bye Bye – Produced by Bastien Daret, Arthur Goisset, Robin Robles; Directed by Amélie Bonnin; King David – Produced by Emmanuel Chaumet; Directed by Lila Pinell; The Right Words – Produced by Lucas To the; Directed by Adrian Moyse Dullin; Women of Virtue – Produced by Anne Berjon, Caroline Adrian; Directed by Stéphanie Halfon	Best Documentary Short Film: Maria Schneider, 1983 – Produced by Helen Olive, Martin Bertier; Directed by Elisabeth Subrin; Churchill, Polar Bear Town – Produced by Clarisse Tupin; Directed by Annabelle Amoros; Ecoutez le Battement de Nos Images – Produced and directed by Audrey Jean-Baptiste, Maxime Jean-Baptiste
Best Foreign Film: The Beasts (Spain, France) – Directed by Rodrigo Sorogoyen; Close (Belgium, Netherlands, France) – Directed by Lukas Dhont; Boy from Heaven (Sweden, France, Finland) – Directed by Tarik Saleh; EO (Poland, Italy) – Directed by Jerzy Skolimowski; Triangle of Sadness (Sweden) – Directed by Ruben Östlund	Best Visual Effects: Notre-Dame on Fire – Laurens Ehrmann; The Five Devils – Guillaume Marien; Smoking Causes Coughing – Sebastien Rame; November – Mikael Tang Uy; Pacifiction – Marco del Bianco
Honorary César: David Fincher

=== Films with multiple nominations ===
The following films received multiple nominations:

Nominations	Films
11	The Innocent
10	The Night of the 12th
9	Pacifiction
9	Rise
7	Forever Young
7	November
4	Full Time
4	Saint Omer
2	Peter von Kant
2	The Sixth Child
2	The Worst Ones
2	Bruno Reidal
2	Final Cut
2	The Colours of Fire
2	Simone Veil, A Woman of the Century

=== Films with multiple wins ===
The following films received multiple wins:

Wins	Films
6	The Night of the 12th
2	Full Time
2	The Innocent
2	Pacifiction
2	Simone Veil, A Woman of the Century

== See also ==
- 95th Academy Awards
- 76th British Academy Film Awards
- 68th David di Donatello
- 35th European Film Awards
- 80th Golden Globe Awards
- 37th Goya Awards
- 28th Lumière Awards
- 12th Magritte Awards
