= List of French films of 2022 =

A list of French-produced and co-produced films scheduled for release in 2022. When applicable, the domestic theatrical release date is favoured.

== Films ==
Title	Director	Cast	Notes	Release date	Ref
Alam	Firas Khoury				
Arthur, malédiction	Barthélémy Grossmann	Vadim Agid, Lola Andreoni, Mathieu Berger		29 June	
Ashkal	Youssef Chebbi				
Athena	Romain Gavras			23 September	
The Beasts (As bestas)	Rodrigo Sorogoyen	Denis Ménochet, Marina Foïs, Luis Zahera, Diego Anido, Marie Colomb	Spain-France coproduction	20 July	
Blind Willow, Sleeping Woman (Saules aveugles, femme endormie)	Pierre Földes			16 June	
The Blue Caftan (Le Bleu du Caftan)	Maryam Touzani				
Boy from Heaven (La Conspiration du Caire)	Tarik Saleh		Sweden-France-Finland coproduction	26 October	
Brother and Sister (Frère et Sœur)	Arnaud Desplechin	Marion Cotillard, Melvil Poupaud, Golshifteh Farahani		20 May	
Casa Susanna	Sébastien Lifshitz				
Coma	Bertrand Bonello	Louise Labèque, Julia Faure, Gaspard Ulliel, Laetitia Casta, Vincent Lacoste, Louis Garrel, Anaïs Demoustier		16 November	
Corsage	Marie Kreutzer		Austria-Germany-Luxembourg-France coproduction	14 December	
The Dam (Le Barrage)	Ali Cherri				
De Humani Corporis Fabrica	Lucien Castaing-Taylor, Véréna Paravel		France-Switzerland coproduction		
Driving Madeleine (Une belle course)	Christian Carion		France-Belgium coproduction	21 September	
Falcon Lake	Charlotte Le Bon	Joseph Engel, Sara Montpetit, Karine Gonthier-Hyndman, Monia Chokri	Canada-France coproduction		
Final Cut (Coupez!)	Michel Hazanavicius			17 May	
The Five Devils (Les Cinq Diables)	Léa Mysius			31 August	
Forever Young (Les Amandiers)	Valeria Bruni Tedeschi			16 November	
The Gravity (La Gravité)	Cédric Ido			21 December	
Hawa	Maïmouna Doucouré	Sania Halifa, Oumou Sangaré, Yseult, Kamrul Hossain		9 December	
Heart of Oak	Laurent Charbonnier, Michel Seydoux			23 February	
Holy Spider	Ali Abbasi			13 July	
The Hummingbird (Il Colibri)	Francesca Archibugi		Italian-French coproduction		
L'immensità	Emanuele Crialese	Luana Giuliani, Penélope Cruz, Vincenzo Amato, Patrizio Francioni, Maria Chiara Goretti, Penelope Nieto Conti, Alvia Reale, India Santella	Italy-France coproduction		
The Innocent (L'Innocent)	Louis Garrel			12 October	
The Pack (La jauría)	Andrés Ramírez Pulido				
Little Nicholas: Happy As Can Be (Le Petit Nicolas : Qu'est-ce qu'on attend pour être heureux ?)	Amandine Fredon, Benjamin Massoubre	Alain Chabat, Laurent Lafitte		20 May	
Maigret	Patrice Leconte	Gérard Depardieu	Belgium-France coproduction	23 February	
Mother and Son (Le petit frère)	Léonor Serraille				
My Imaginary Country (Mi país imaginario)	Patricio Guzmán		Chile-France coproduction		
Nobody's Hero (Viens je t'emmène)	Alain Guiraudie			2 March	
Notes For a Film (Notes pour un film)	Ignacio Agüero	Gustave Verniory, Alexis Maspreuve, Ignacio Agüero	Chile-France coproduction		
November (Novembre)	Cédric Jimenez	Jean Dujardin, Anaïs Demoustier, Sandrine Kiberlain, Jérémie Renier, Lyna Khoudri		5 October	
On the Edge (Entre la vie et la mort)	Giordano Gederlini	Antonio de la Torre, Marine Vacth, Olivier Gourmet	Belgium-France-Spain coproduction	29 June	
One Fine Morning (Un beau matin)	Mia Hansen-Løve			5 October	
The Origin of Evil (L'Origine du mal)	Sébastien Marnier	Laure Calamy, Jacques Weber, Dominique Blanc, Suzanne Clément		5 October	
Other People's Children (Les Enfants des autres)	Rebecca Zlotowski	Virginie Efira, Roschdy Zem, Chiara Mastroianni, Callie Ferreira-Goncalves		21 September	
Pacifiction (Tourment sur les îles)	Albert Serra	Benoît Magimel, Pahoa Mahagafanau, Marc Susini, Matahi Pambrun, Alexandre Melo, Sergi López, Montse Triola, Michael Vautor, Cécile Guilbert, Lluis Serrat, Mike Landscape, Cyrus Arai, Mareva Wong, Baptiste Pinteaux	France-Spain-Germany-Portugal coproduction	9 November	
Paris Memories (Revoir Paris)	Alice Winocour			7 September	
Piggy (Cerdita)	Carlota Pereda	Laura Galán, Richard Holmes, Carmen Machi, Irene Ferreiro, Camille Aguilar, Claudia Salas, Pilar Castro	Spain-France coproduction	2 November	
La Provisoria	Melina Fernández da Silva & Nicolás Meta	Andrés Ciavaglia, Ana Pauls, Juan Chapur, Sol Bordigoni, Nicolás Juárez, Albertina Vázquez	Argentina-Chile-Mexico-Brazil-Colombia-France coproduction		
Return to Seoul (Retour à Seoul)	Davy Chou				
Rewind & Play	Alain Gomis				
Rodeo (Rodéo)	Lola Quivoron			7 September	
Saint Omer	Alice Diop			23 November	
Stars at Noon	Claire Denis				
Three Times Nothing (Trois fois rien)	Nadège Loiseau	Antoine Bertrand, Philippe Rebbot, Côme Levin	Canada-France coproduction	16 March	
Unicorn Wars	Alberto Vázquez		Spain-France coproduction	28 December	
Valiant Hearts (Cœurs vaillants)	Mona Achache	Camille Cottin	France-Belgium coproduction	11 May	
Will-o'-the-Wisp (Fogo-Fátuo)	João Pedro Rodrigues	Mauro Costa, André Cabral	French-Portuguese coproduction	14 September	
Winter Boy (Le Lycéen)	Christophe Honoré	Paul Kircher, Juliette Binoche, Vincent Lacoste		30 November	
The Worst Ones (Les Pires)	Lise Akoka, Romane Gueret	Mallory Wanecque, Timéo Mahaut, Johan Heldenbergh		7 December	
