= 28th Lumière Awards =

2023 French film awards ceremony

- Date: 16 January 2023
- Site: Forum des Images, Paris
- Hosted by: Olivia Salazar-Winspear; Eve Jackson

Highlights
- Best Film: The Night of the 12th
- Best International Co-Production: The Beasts
- Best Direction: Albert Serra; Pacifiction
- Best Actor: Benoît Magimel; Pacifiction
- Best Actress: Virginie Efira; Other People's Children
- Most nominations: The Night of the 12th (6)

The 28th Lumière Awards ceremony, presented by the Académie des Lumières, took place on 16 January 2023 to honour the best in French-speaking cinema of 2022. The nominations were announced on 15 December 2022. The Night of the 12th led the nominations with six.

== Winners and nominees ==
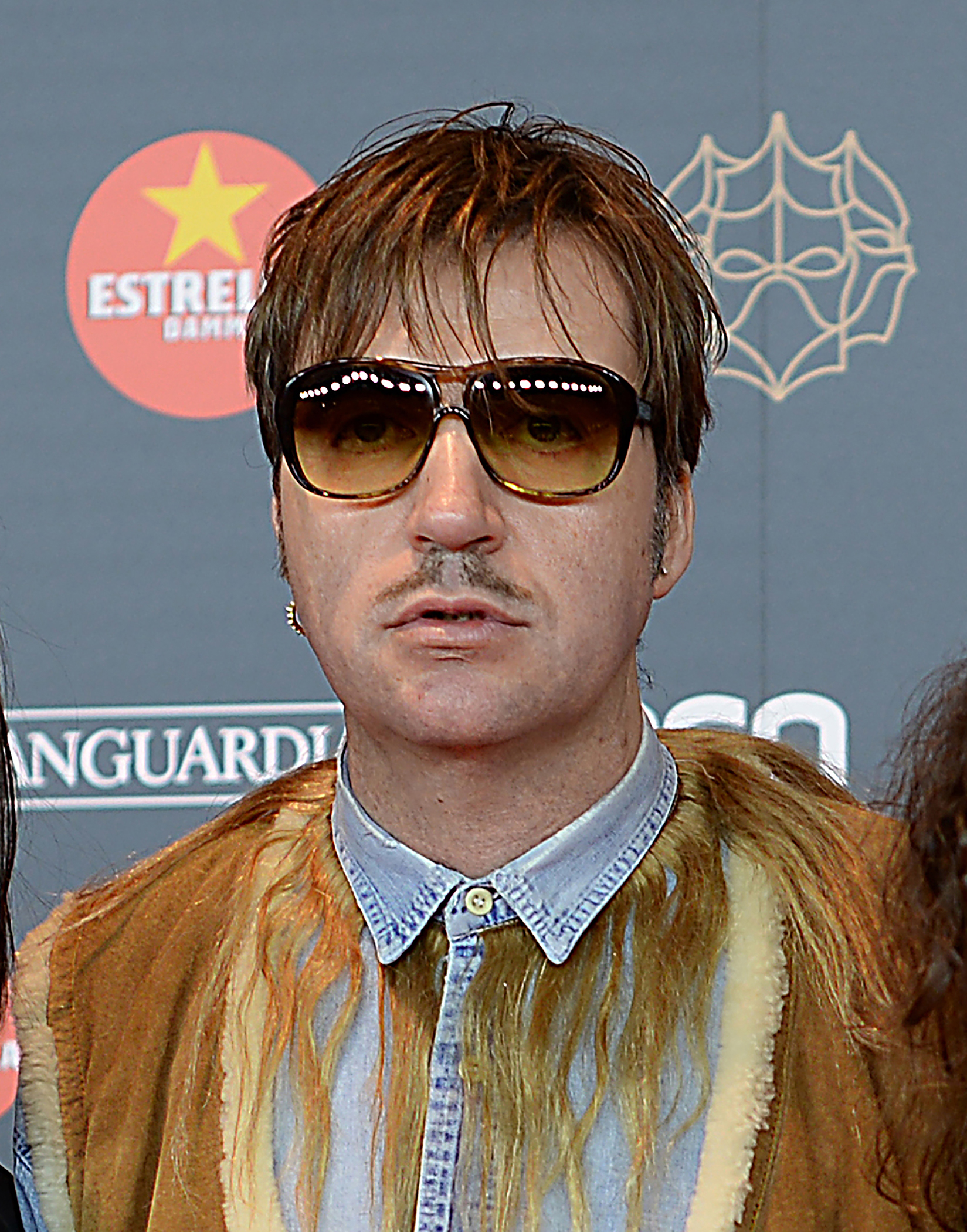
Albert Serra, Best Director winner

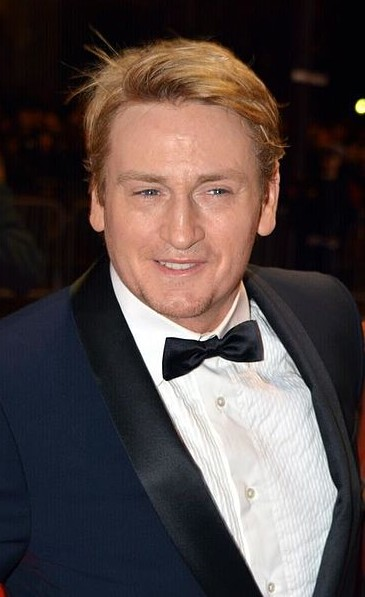
Benoît Magimel, Best Actor winner

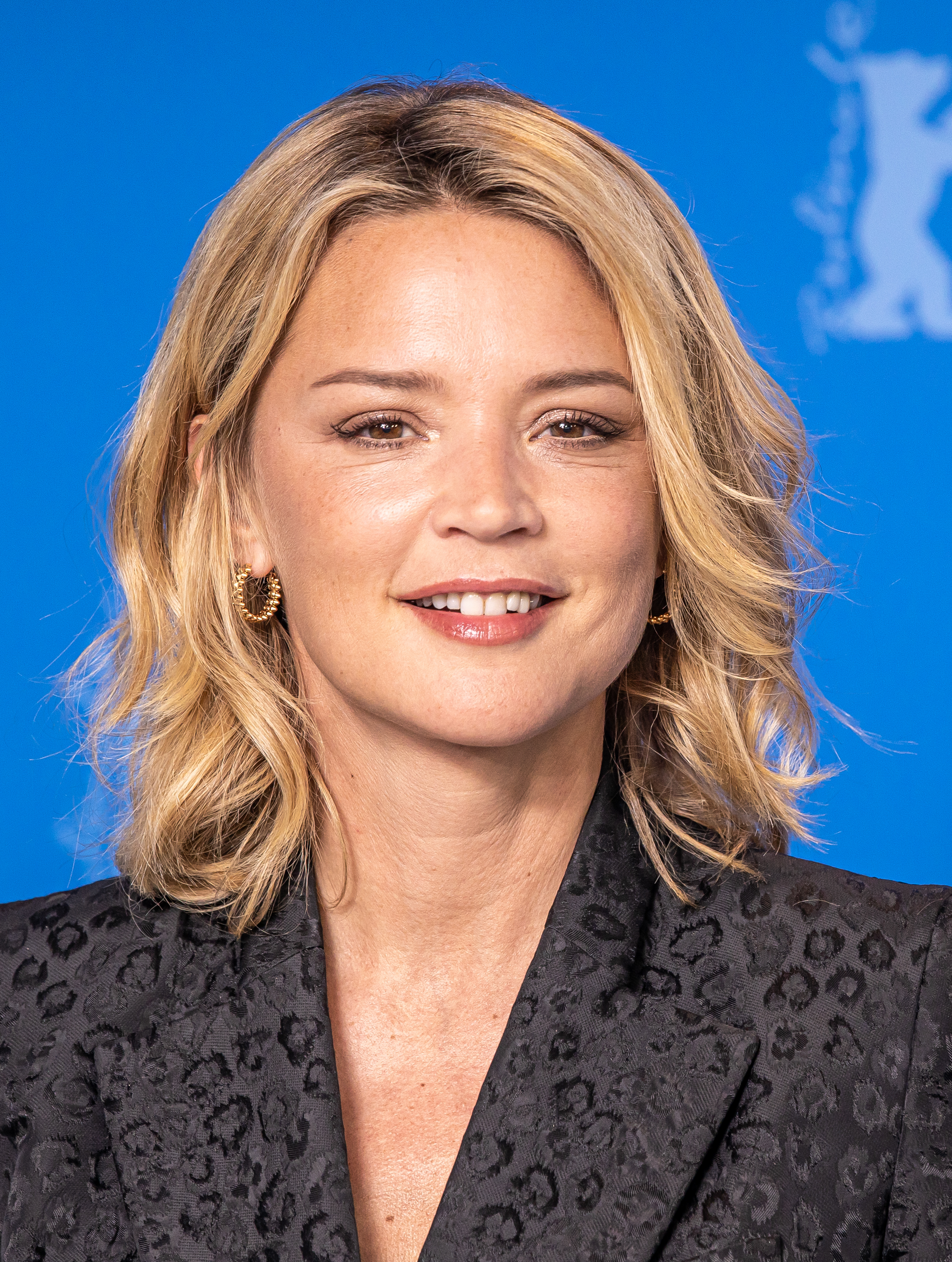
Virginie Efira, Best Actress winner

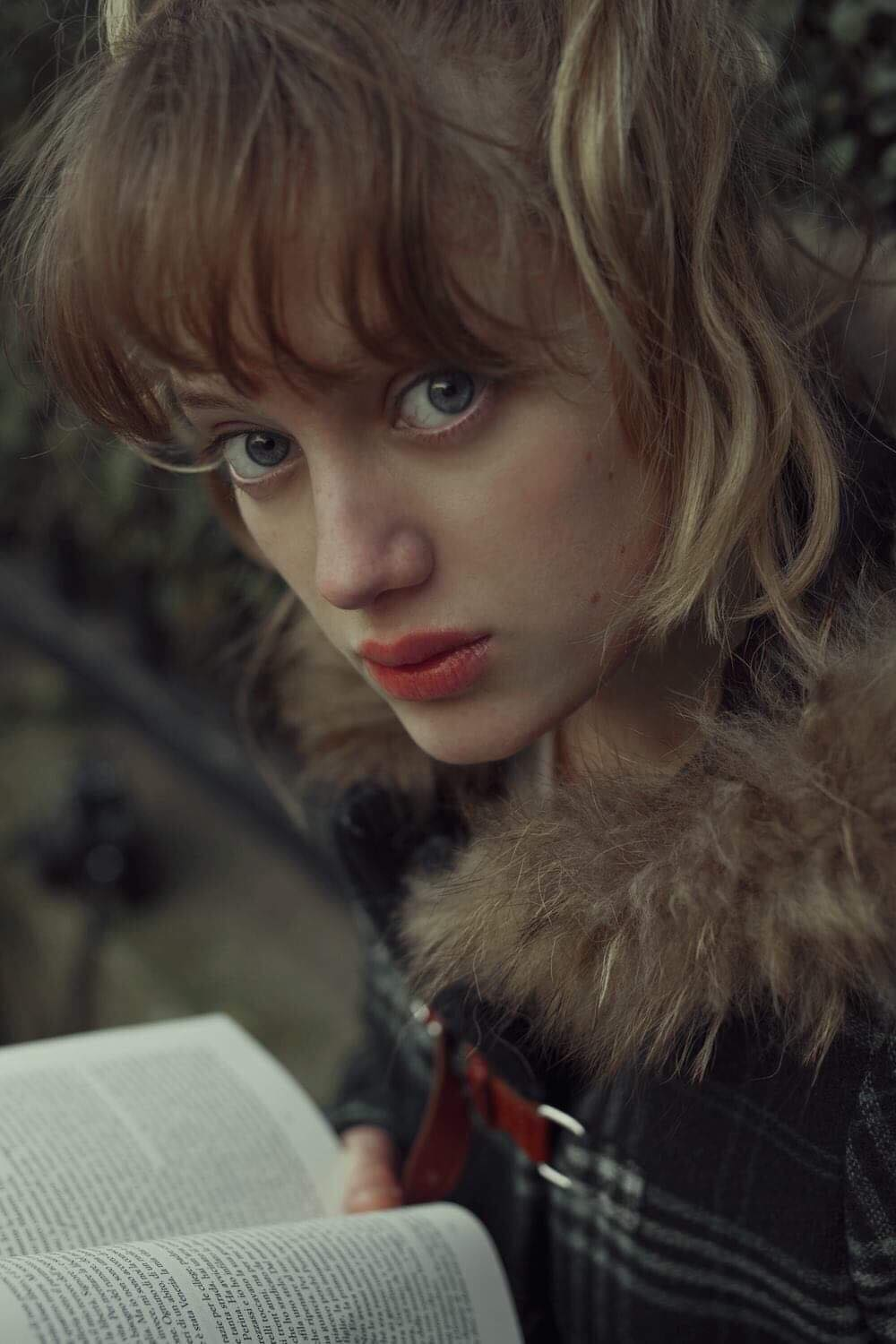
Nadia Tereszkiewicz, Best Female Revelation winner

The nominations were announced on 15 December 2022. Winners will be listed first, highlighted in boldface, and indicated with a double dagger (‡).

**Best Film**: **The Night of the 12th – Directed by Dominik Moll**‡; Other People's Children – Directed by Rebecca Zlotowski; Pacifiction – Directed by Albert Serra; Paris Memories – Directed by Alice Winocour; Saint Omer – Directed by Alice Diop	**Best Director**: **Albert Serra – Pacifiction**‡; Rebecca Zlotowski – Other People's Children; Dominik Moll – The Night of the 12th; Valeria Bruni-Tedeschi – Forever Young; Gaspar Noé – Vortex
**Best Actor**: **Benoît Magimel – Pacifiction as De Roller**‡; Bastien Bouillon – The Night of the 12th as Yohan Vivès; Louis Garrel – The Innocent as Abel; Vincent Macaigne – Diary of a Fleeting Affair as Simon; Denis Ménochet – The Beasts as Antoine	**Best Actress**: **Virginie Efira – Other People's Children as Rachel**‡; Françoise Lebrun – Vortex as Elle; Noémie Merlant – The Innocent as Clémence; Juliette Binoche – Between Two Worlds as Marianne Winckler; Laure Calamy – Full Time as Julie Roy
**Best Male Revelation**: **Dimitri Doré – Bruno Reidal as Bruno Reidal**‡; Adam Bessa – Harka as Ali; Stefan Crepon – Peter von Kant as Karl; Paul Kircher – Winter Boy as Lucas; Aliocha Reinert – Softie as Johnny	**Best Female Revelation**: **Nadia Tereszkiewicz – Forever Young as Stella**‡; Guslagie Malanda – Saint Omer as Laurence Coly; Hélène Lambert – Between Two Worlds as Christèle Thomassin; Marion Barbeau – Rise as Élise; Rebecca Marder – A Radiant Girl as Irène
**Best First Film**: **The Sixth Child – Léopold Legrand**‡; Bruno Reidal – Vincent Le Port; Harka – Lotfy Nathan; The Worst Ones – Lise Akoka and Romane Gueret; Everybody Loves Jeanne – Céline Devaux	**Best Screenplay**: **The Night of the 12th – Dominik Moll and Gilles Marchand**‡; Other People's Children – Rebecca Zlotowski; Saint Omer – Alice Diop, Marie NDiaye and Amrita David; The Innocent – Louis Garrel and Tanguy Viel; Winter Boy – Christophe Honoré
**Best Cinematography**: **Pacifiction – Artur Tort**‡; The Night of the 12th – Patrick Ghiringhelli; Saint Omer – Claire Mathon; Vortex – Benoît Debie; The Passengers of the Night – Sébastien Buchmann	**Best Music**: **Flickering Ghosts of Loves Gone By – Benjamin Biolay**‡; The Night of the 12th – Olivier Marguerit; The Innocent – Grégoire Hetzel; Full Time – Irène Drésel; Pacifiction – Marc Verdaguer
**Best Documentary**: **We – Alice Diop**‡; The Super Eight Years – Annie Ernaux, David Ernaux-Briot; La Combattante – Camille Ponsin; H6 – Ye Ye; Returning to Reims (Fragments) – Jean-Gabriel Périot	**Best Animated Film**: **Little Nicholas: Happy As Can Be – Amandine Fredon and Benjamin Massoubre**‡; Ernest and Celestine: A Trip to Gibberitia – Julien Chheng and Jean-Christophe Roger; The Black Pharoah, The Savage and The Princess – Michel Ocelot; My Father's Secrets – Véra Belmont; My Neighbours of My Neighbours Are My Neighbours – Anne-Laure Daffis, Léo Marchand
**Best International Co-Production**: **The Beasts (Spain, France) – Rodrigo Sorogoyen**‡; Boy from Heaven (Sweden, France) – Tarik Saleh; Flee (Denmark, France) – Jonas Poher Rasmussen; R.M.N. (Romania, France) – Cristian Mungiu; Zero Fucks Given (Belgium, France) – Emmanuel Marre, Julie Lecoustre

=== Films with multiple nominations and awards ===
Films with multiple nominations
Nominations	Film
6	The Night of the 12th
5	Pacifiction
4	The Innocent
4	Other People's Children
4	Saint Omer
3	Vortex
2	The Beasts
2	Full Time
2	Winter Boy
2	Harka
2	Bruno Reidal
2	Between Two Worlds
2	Forever Young
