= Rebecca Marder =

French actress (born 1995)

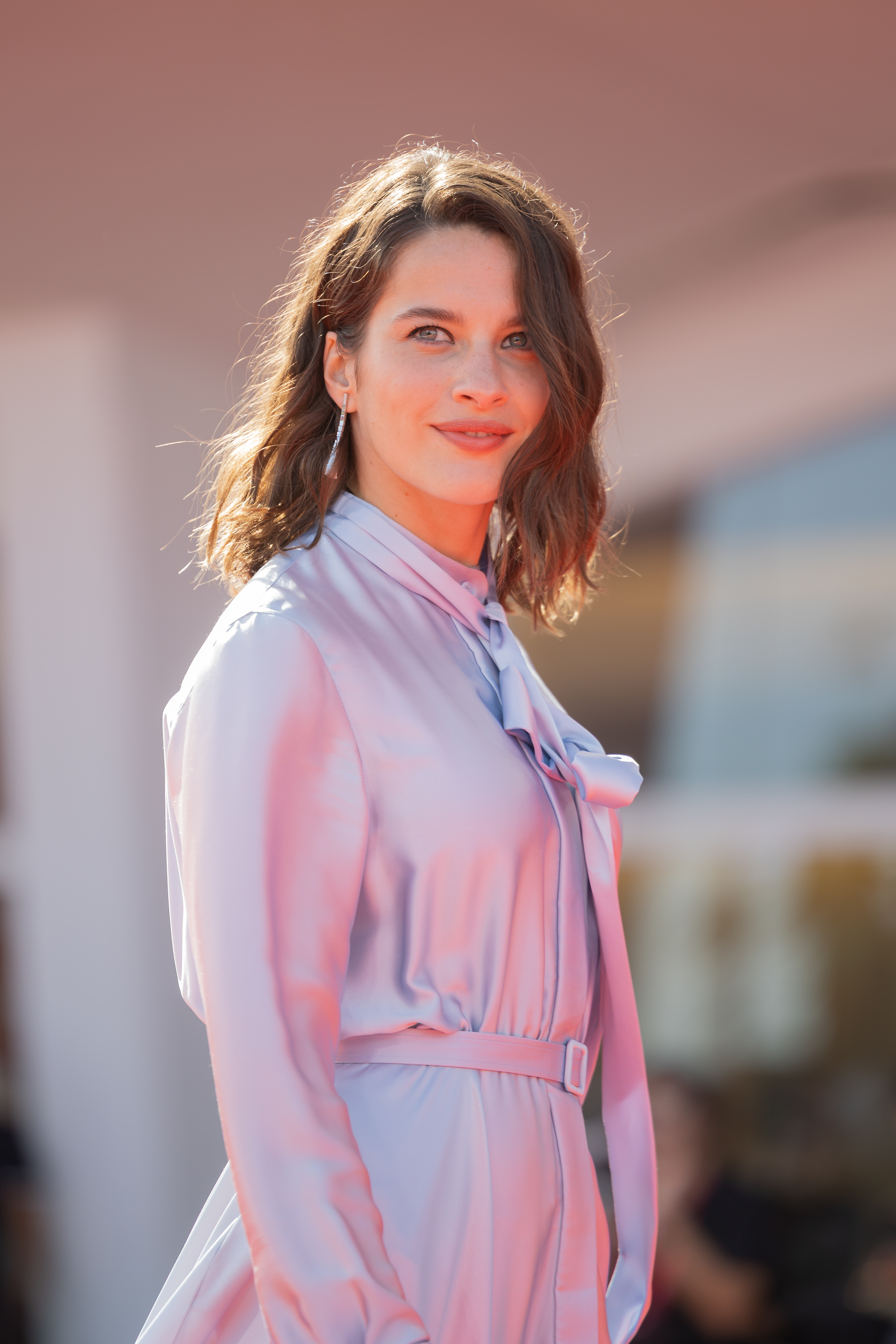
- Marder in 2025
- Born: 10 April 1995 (age 31); Paris, France
- Citizenship: France; United States
- Occupation: Actress
- Years active: 2000–present
- Organization: Comédie-Française (2015–2022)

Rebecca Marder (born 10 April 1995) is a French film and stage actress.

== Early life and education ==
Rebecca Marder was born on 10 April 1995 in Paris, France. Marder is the daughter of American musician Marc Marder and French journalist and theatre critic Mathilde de La Bardonnie, who worked for Le Monde and later Libération. Her father is Jewish and her mother Catholic. Marder grew up in France and is a dual citizen of France and the United States.

Between 2008 and 2011, Marder was trained at the Conservatoire à rayonnement communal du 13^{e} arrondissement de Paris. She later studied literature and cinema but interrupted her studies in September 2014 to join the drama school of the National Theatre of Strasbourg, where she studied for ten months.

== Career ==
Marder began her acting career at the age of five. She appeared as Charlotte in the Rodolphe Marconi film Ceci est mon corps (2001). In 2007, she starred in Demandez la permission aux enfants alongside Pascal Légitimus and Sandrine Bonnaire. In 2010, she starred in The Round Up together with Jean Reno and Mélanie Laurent. In 2012, she received the Prix du jeune espoir féminin at the Festival de la fiction TV de La Rochelle for her performance in Alain Tasma's television film Emma.

Marder was discovered by Éric Ruf, general administrator of the Comédie-Française, and chosen after a collective audition. She signed her contract on 19 June 2015, becoming a salaried actress (pensionnaire) of the Comédie-Française troupe. At 20 years old, she became one the youngest pensionnaires in its history, and the youngest of the troupe's then 59 actors. She debuted in the role of Lucietta in Carlo Goldoni's Les Rustres. She regularly appeared on stage there in classical roles, including as Claudine in Molière's George Dandin ou le Mari confondu and La Jalousie du Barbouillé, Atalide in Jean Racine's Bajazet and Hermione in Euripides' Electra and Orestes. In 2022, Marder announced her resignation from the Comédie-Française.

In 2020, Marder was a narrator of the Cambodian documentary film Irradiated, which competed for the Golden Bear in the main competition section at the 70th Berlin International Film Festival. Marder's father composed the film's score. In 2021, Marder appeared in the lead role of Sandrine Kiberlain's feature directorial debut A Radiant Girl, in which she plays a Jewish girl who aspires to become an actress in Paris during the German occupation in 1942. The film premiered in the Critics' Week section of the 2021 Cannes Film Festival, where it competed for the Caméra d'Or. For her performance, Marder received nominations for the César Award for Most Promising Actress and Lumière Award for Best Female Revelation.

In 2022, Marder portrayed a young Simone Veil in Olivier Dahan's biographical drama Simone Veil, A Woman of the Century. That same year, she starred in Sylvain Desclous's Grand Expectations, for which she received a second César nomination for Most Promising Actress. In 2023, Marder appeared opposite Nadia Tereszkiewicz in François Ozon's crime comedy The Crime Is Mine. Set in the 1930s, Marder portrays a lawyer who works to acquit her young actress roommate on grounds of self-defense after she is accused of murdering a wealthy producer.

In 2025, Marder starred as Marie Cardona in Ozon's The Stranger, an adaptation of the novel by Albert Camus.

== Performances ==
=== Film ===
Year	Title	Role	Director	Notes
2000	Pimprenelle		Yamina Benguigui	Short film
2001	Ceci est mon corps	Charlotte	Rodolphe Marconi	
2007	Demandez la permission aux enfants	Lola	Éric Civanyan	
2010	The Round Up	Rachel Weismann	Roselyne Bosch	
2014	Garçonne	Lisa	Nicolas Sarkissian	Short film
2018	A Man in a Hurry	Julia	Hervé Mimran	
2019	Escape from Raqqa	Fille timide	Emmanuel Hamon	
2019	Someone, Somewhere	Capucine Brunet	Cédric Klapisch	
2020	Mama Weed	Gabrielle Portefeux	Jean-Paul Salomé	
2020	Irradiated	—N/a	Rithy Panh	Narrator; documentary
2020	Spring Blossom	Marie	Suzanne Lindon	
2021	A Radiant Girl	Irène	Sandrine Kiberlain	
2021	Deception	L'étudiante	Arnaud Desplechin	
2022	Simone Veil, A Woman of the Century	Young Simone Veil	Olivier Dahan	
2022	Not My Type	Marcia	Michel Leclerc	
2022	Grand Expectations	Madeleine	Sylvain Desclous	
2022	The Great Magic	Amélie	Noémie Lvovsky	
2023	The Crime Is Mine	Pauline Mauléon	François Ozon	
2025	The Stranger	Marie Cardona	François Ozon	
TBA	The Third Hand †	TBA	Michel Hazanavicius	Post-production

=== Television ===
Year	Title	Role	Director	Notes
2009	Clara, une passion française	Marie-Claude, de 13 à 20 ans	Sébastien Grall	Television film
2011	E-Love	Nina	Anne Villacèque	Television film
2012	Emma	Emma	Alain Tasma	Television film
2015	Deux	Evelyne	Anne Villacèque	Television film
2018	Fiertés	Noémie	Philippe Faucon	Miniseries; episode: "2013"
2026	Les Lionnes	Rosalie	Olivier Rosemberg	8 episodes

=== Stage ===
Stage credits of Rebecca Marder
Year	Production	Role	Author	Director	Theatre	Notes	Ref(s)
2015–2016	Les Rustres	Lucietta	Carlo Goldoni	Jean-Louis Benoît	Théâtre du Vieux-Colombier		
2016	George Dandin ou le Mari confondu / La Jalousie du Barbouillé	Claudine / Cathau	Molière	Hervé Pierre	Théâtre du Vieux-Colombier		
2017–2018	La Règle du jeu	Invitée	Jean Renoir	Christiane Jatahy	Salle Richelieu		
2017	Bajazet	Atalide	Jean Racine	Éric Ruf	Théâtre du Vieux-Colombier		
2017–2019	L'Hôtel du libre échange	Violette	Georges Feydeau	Isabelle Nanty	Salle Richelieu		
2017–2018	Après la pluie	Secrétaire brune	Sergi Belbel	Lilo Baur	Théâtre du Vieux-Colombier		
2018	J'étais dans ma maison et j'attendais que la pluie vienne	La Plus Jeune	Jean-Luc Lagarce	Chloé Dabert	Théâtre du Vieux-Colombier		
2018	L'Éveil du printemps	Thea	Frank Wedekind	Clément Hervieu-Léger	Salle Richelieu		
2019	Fanny et Alexandre	Fanny	Ingmar Bergman	Julie Deliquet	Salle Richelieu		
2019–2020	Electre / Oreste	Hermione	Euripides	Ivo van Hove	Salle Richelieu		
2019	Les Serge (Gainsbourg point barre)	Serge Gainsbourg	Stéphane Varupenne and Sébastien Pouderoux	Stéphane Varupenne and Sébastien Pouderoux	Studio-Théâtre de la Comédie-Française	Vocals, keyboard	
2020	Le Côté de Guermantes	Rachel	Marcel Proust	Christophe Honoré	Théâtre Marigny		
2021–2022	Fanny et Alexandre	Fanny	Ingmar Bergman	Julie Deliquet	Salle Richelieu		
2021–2022	La Cerisaie	Ania	Anton Chekhov	Clément Hervieu-Léger	Salle Richelieu		
2022	George Dandin ou le Mari confondu	Angélique	Molière	Hervé Pierre	Théâtre du Vieux-Colombier		

== Accolades ==
Award	Date of ceremony	Category	Title	Result	Ref.
César Awards	24 February 2023	Most Promising Actress	A Radiant Girl	Nominated	
César Awards	23 February 2024	Most Promising Actress	Grand Expectations	Nominated	
Lumière Awards	16 January 2023	Best Female Revelation	A Radiant Girl	Nominated	
