= Grand Expectations =

2022 film by Sylvain Desclous

- Theatrical release poster
- French: De grandes espérances
- Directed by: Sylvain Desclous
- Written by: Sylvain Desclous; Pierre Erwan Guillaume
- Produced by: Florence Borelly
- Starring: Rebecca Marder; Benjamin Lavernhe; Emmanuelle Bercot
- Cinematography: Julien Hirsch
- Edited by: Isabelle Poudevigne
- Music by: Florencia Di Concilio
- Production companies: Sésame Films; Auvergne-Rhône-Alpes Cinéma
- Distributed by: The Jokers
- Release dates: 27 August 2022 (Angoulême); 22 March 2023 (France)
- Running time: 105 minutes
- Country: France
- Language: French
- Box office: $1.6 million

Grand Expectations (French: De grandes espérances) is a 2022 French psychological political thriller film directed by Sylvain Desclous. It stars Rebecca Marder and Benjamin Lavernhe in the lead roles. It premiered on 27 August 2022 at the Angoulême Francophone Film Festival. It was released in France on 22 March 2023.

== Plot ==
Madeleine is an aspiring politician preparing for her ENA oral exam. While on vacation in Corsica, she and her boyfriend Antoine are attacked on a deserted road. After Madeleine accidentally kills their attacker, the couple flee but their secret imperils their political ambitions.

== Cast ==
- Rebecca Marder as Madeleine Pastor
- Benjamin Lavernhe as Antoine Mandeville
- Emmanuelle Bercot as Gabrielle Dervaz
- Marc Barbé as Yvan Pastor, Madeleine's father
- Pascal Elso as Bertrand Mandeville, Antoine's father
- Thomas Thévenoud as Thomas Peltier, the Minister of Labour
- Cédric Appietto as Lucciani, the attacker in Corsica
- Jean-Emmanuel Pagni as Lieutenant Hassani
- Pascal Rénéric as le directeur général de Rochambeau
- Aurélie Marpeaux as l'ouvrière
- Holy Fatma as the lawyer
- Marie-Pierre Nouveau as the judge

== Production ==
Filming took place over 20 days in the Auvergne-Rhône-Alpes region, mostly in and around the city of Lyon, including in its La Guillotière neighborhood, within the town hall of the 6th arrondissement, in the La Croix-Rousse neighborhood, in Villeurbanne, in Chaponnay (Rhône), in a factory in Chassieu, at the prison in Corbas, and in Oullins. Filming also took place in Montmerle-sur-Saône, in the Ain department.

== Release ==
Grand Expectations was selected to be screened at the 15th Angoulême Francophone Film Festival, where it had its world premiere on 27 August 2022.

The Jokers distributed the film in France on 22 March 2023.

== Reception ==
=== Box office ===
In France, the film opened alongside John Wick: Chapter 4, Sur les chemins noirs, The Blue Caftan, The Eternal Daughter, Love According to Dalva and Chile '76. It sold 14,911 admissions on its first day, 6,034 of which were preview screenings, from a total of 625 screens. It went on to sell 67,747 admissions in its opening weekend, finishing 10th at the box office, behind La Chambre des merveilles. At the end of its theatrical run, the film sold a total of 202,165 admissions.

=== Critical response ===
Grand Expectations received an average rating of 3.6 out of 5 stars on the French website AlloCiné, based on 25 reviews.

=== Accolades ===
Award	Date of ceremony	Category	Recipient(s)	Result	Ref.
César Awards	23 February 2024	Best Female Revelation	Rebecca Marder	Nominated	
Jean Carmet Festival	18 October 2022	Best Supporting Actor	Marc Barbé	Won	
