= The Innocent (2022 film) =

Film by Louis Garrel

- Theatrical release poster
- French: L'Innocent
- Directed by: Louis Garrel
- Written by: Tanguy Viel; Louis Garrel; Naïla Guiguet (Note: Collaboration)
- Produced by: Anne-Dominique Toussaint
- Starring: Roschdy Zem; Anouk Grinberg; Noémie Merlant; Louis Garrel
- Cinematography: Julien Poupard
- Edited by: Pierre Deschamps
- Music by: Grégoire Hetzel
- Production companies: Les Films des Tournelles; Arte France Cinéma; Auvergne-Rhône-Alpes Cinema
- Distributed by: Ad Vitam Distribution
- Release dates: 24 May 2022 (Cannes); 12 October 2022 (France)
- Running time: 100 minutes
- Country: France
- Language: French
- Box office: $5.2 million

The Innocent (French: L'Innocent) is a 2022 French crime comedy film directed by Louis Garrel, from a screenplay by Garrel, Tanguy Viel and Naïla Guiguet. It stars Roschdy Zem, Anouk Grinberg, Noémie Merlant and Garrel.

The film had its world premiere out of competition at the 75th Cannes Film Festival on 24 May 2022. It was released in France on 12 October 2022 by Ad Vitam Distribution. The film received a leading eleven nominations at the 48th César Awards, winning in the categories Best Original Screenplay and Best Supporting Actress for Merlant.

== Plot ==
Sylvie, a prison theater teacher, meets and marries Michel, one of the prison inmates whom she teaches. Their union is not well-received by Sylvie's adult son, Abel, as Sylvie has been involved with prison inmates previously, which ended poorly on each occasion. Abel himself has a troubled past, harboring guilt over being the driver in a car accident where his wife, Maud, was killed.

Upon Michel's release from prison, he and Sylvie plan to open a flower shop, using premises which Michel claims were provided to him by a friend as a business favor. Suspicious about Michel's motives given his criminal past, Abel recruits Clémence, his best friend and co-worker at the aquarium at which he works, to assist him in spying on Michel, but their initial attempts prove to be fruitless.

Frustrated with Abel's amateurish and easily-discovered attempts at spying on him, Michel explains to Abel that in order to pay back the favor of receiving the premises, he and an associate, Jean-Paul, are to steal a shipment of caviar from a freight truck while its driver eats at a restaurant. Michel offers Abel the opportunity to participate in the planned heist and receive a share of the profits, as incentive for not turning Michel in to the police. Abel accepts, and recruits Clémence in turn.

Michel explains that the truck driver has a set pattern when it comes to the restaurant he goes to and the time it takes for him to finish his meal. In order to guarantee that the truck driver will spend long enough in the restaurant for Michel and Jean-Paul to steal the caviar, Abel and Clémence are commissioned with staging a domestic scene in front of the driver which is sufficiently compelling enough for the driver to want to see it to its conclusion.

On the night of the heist, the contrived domestic dispute between Abel and Clémence evolves into a genuine conversation where the two of them admit mutual romantic feelings for one another. Their conversation successfully distracts the driver and enables Michel and Jean-Paul to steal the caviar. However, when two masked men arrive at the scene, it is revealed that Jean-Paul intends to double-cross Michel and take the caviar for himself.

Abel and Clémence rescue Michel (along with the caviar) and escape from Jean-Paul and his accomplices; during their escape, Michel is shot in the leg. Forced into going to the hospital, Michel is confronted by Sylvie, who berates him for his lies and for having involved Abel in his scheme, before departing without any further word.

Meanwhile, Abel goes to deliver the caviar to Michel's client, but is arrested by police at the delivery point. He refuses to give up any of his accomplices, and is subsequently sent to prison. While in prison, he marries Clémence, with Sylvie present. He also receives a letter from the still-free Michel, who notes that Sylvie still refuses to speak to him, but that he retains hope that she will change her mind.

== Cast ==
- Roschdy Zem as Michel, an ex-con living in Lyon.
- Anouk Grinberg as Sylvie, a prison theater teacher.
- Noémie Merlant as Clémence, who works at an aquarium.
- Louis Garrel as Abel, Sylvie's son, a tour guide at the aquarium and friend of Clémence.
- Jean-Claude Pautot as Jean-Paul, an associate of Michel.
- Yanisse Kebbab as The Caviar Truck Driver

== Production ==
In December 2021, it was announced Roschdy Zem, Anouk Grinberg, Noémie Merlant and Louis Garrel had joined the cast of the film, with Garrel set to direct from a screenplay by himself, Tanguy Viel and Naïla Guiguet.

Principal photography began in November 2021.

== Release ==
The Innocent had its world premiere out of competition at the 75th Cannes Film Festival on 24 May 2022. It had a limited release in France on 12 October 2022 by Ad Vitam Distribution and in the United States on 17 March 2023 by Janus Films. It was released on VOD on 2023.

== Reception ==
=== Box office ===
The Innocent grossed $34,822 in North America, and $5.1 million in other territories for a total worldwide of $5.2 million. The film sold 700,690 tickets in France and a total of 727,455 tickets in Europe.

=== Critical response ===
On the review aggregator website Rotten Tomatoes, the film holds an approval rating of 100% based on 21 reviews, with an average rating of 7.5/10. Metacritic, which uses a weighted average, assigned the film a score of 69 out of 100, based on 8 critics, indicating "generally favorable" reviews.

=== Awards and nominations ===
Awards and nominations for The Innocent
Award or film festival	Date of ceremony	Category	Recipient(s)	Result	Ref.
Lumière Awards	16 January 2023	Best Actor	Louis Garrel	Nominated	
Lumière Awards	16 January 2023	Best Actress	Noémie Merlant	Nominated	
Lumière Awards	16 January 2023	Best Screenplay	Louis Garrel and Tanguy Viel	Nominated	
Lumière Awards	16 January 2023	Best Music	Grégoire Hetzel	Nominated	
César Awards	24 February 2023	Best Film		Nominated	
César Awards	24 February 2023	Best Director	Louis Garrel	Nominated	
César Awards	24 February 2023	Best Actor	Louis Garrel	Nominated	
César Awards	24 February 2023	Best Supporting Actor	Roschdy Zem	Nominated	
César Awards	24 February 2023	Best Supporting Actress	Anouk Grinberg	Nominated	
César Awards	24 February 2023	Best Supporting Actress	Noémie Merlant	Won	
César Awards	24 February 2023	Best Original Screenplay	Louis Garrel, Tanguy Viel, Naïla Guiguet	Won	
César Awards	24 February 2023	Best Editing	Pierre Deschamps	Nominated	
César Awards	24 February 2023	Best Sound	Laurent Benaim, Alexis Meynet, Olivier Guillaume	Nominated	
César Awards	24 February 2023	Best Original Music	Grégoire Hetzel	Nominated	
César Awards	24 February 2023	Best Costume Design	Corinne Bruand	Nominated	
Cabourg Film Festival	17 June 2023	Best Actor	Louis Garrel	Won	
Cabourg Film Festival	17 June 2023	Best Actress	Noémie Merlant	Won	
