= A Radiant Girl =

2021 French drama film

- Theatrical release poster
- French: Une jeune fille qui va bien
- Directed by: Sandrine Kiberlain
- Screenplay by: Sandrine Kiberlain
- Produced by: Olivier Delbosc; Pauline Duhault
- Starring: Rebecca Marder; André Marcon; Anthony Bajon; India Hair; Françoise Widhoff
- Cinematography: Guillaume Schiffman
- Edited by: François Gédigier
- Music by: Patrick Desreumaux; Marc Marder
- Production companies: Curiosa Films; E.D.I Films; France 3 Cinéma
- Distributed by: Ad Vitam Distribution
- Release dates: 8 July 2021 (Cannes); 26 January 2022 (France)
- Running time: 98 minutes
- Country: France
- Language: French
- Budget: €3.7 million
- Box office: $1.2 million

A Radiant Girl (French: Une jeune fille qui va bien, lit. 'A young girl who is doing well') is a 2021 French drama film written and directed by Sandrine Kiberlain in her feature directorial debut. The film stars Rebecca Marder as a young Jewish girl aspiring to become an actress during the occupation of France. The film premiered in the Critics' Week section of the 2021 Cannes Film Festival, where it competed for the Caméra d'Or.

== Premise ==
In 1942, 19-year-old Irène is a young Jewish girl living in Paris. She has a passion for theatre and dreams of becoming an actress. Irène rehearses Marivaux's L'Épreuve to prepare for an entrance exam to the conservatory.

== Cast ==
- Rebecca Marder as Irène
- André Marcon as André, Irène's father
- Anthony Bajon as Igor, Irène's brother
- India Hair as Viviane, Irène's friend
- Françoise Widhoff as Marceline, Irène's grandmother
- Florence Viala as Josiane, a neighbor
- Ben Attal as Jo
- Cyril Metzger as Jacques
- Jean Chevalier as Gilbert

== Production ==
In May 2017, Sandrine Kiberlain revealed in an interview with Elle magazine that she would be preparing her first feature film and that it was to be a long-term project, which would require a lot of time and work. In an interview with Gala magazine, Kiberlain called the film "extremely personal" and explained, "I had the story in me for ten years, and it took me a long year to write it, alone."

Filming began on 17 July 2020 in the 8th arrondissement of Paris, for a period of 5 weeks. Filming concluded in August 2020 in Vexin, which included shots at Nesles-la-Vallée on the Sausseron river, as well as a road between Hédouville and Ronquerolles in the Val-d'Oise department.

== Release ==
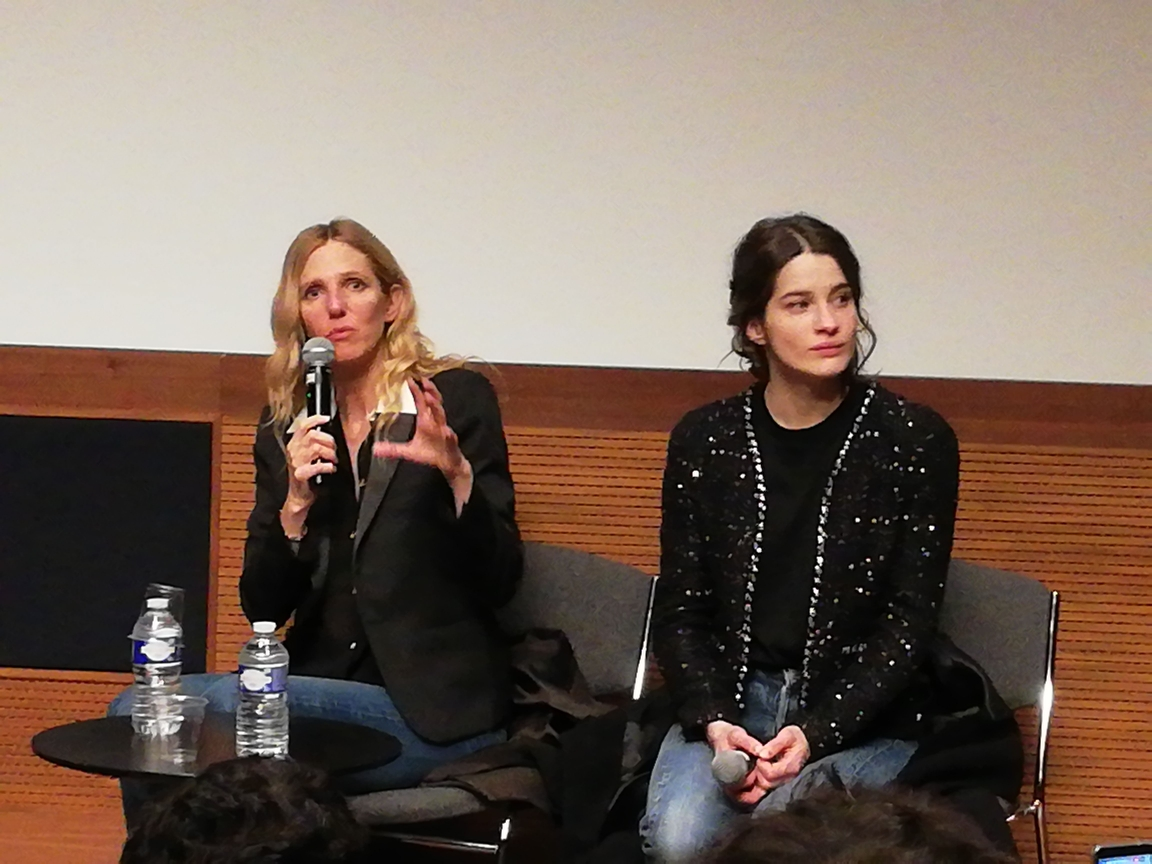
Sandrine Kiberlain and Rebecca Marder at a screening of A Radiant Girl, 19 January 2022

The film was selected as a special screening in the Critics' Week section at the 2021 Cannes Film Festival, where it had its world premiere on 8 July 2021. It had its theatrical release in France through Ad Vitam Distribution on 26 January 2022.

== Reception ==
=== Critical response ===
On Rotten Tomatoes, the film holds an approval rating of 82% based on 22 reviews, with an average rating of 7/10. On Metacritic, the film has a weighted average score of 62 out of 100, based on 7 critic reviews, indicating "generally favorable" reviews. A Radiant Girl received an average rating of 3.6 out of 5 stars on the French website AlloCiné, based on 28 reviews.

Jonathan Romney of Screen Daily praised the "highly appealing effusiveness" of Marder's performance but criticized Kiberlain's stylistic choices and the film's "heavy-handed" conclusion: "A Radiant Girl is highly theatrical [...] in its emphasis on the nature of stage performance – which often gets the film bogged down in backstage discussion of a sort that can too easily feel alienating to film audiences. This only adds to the awkwardness of a film that - especially in its treatment of one of the gravest topics in modern French history - ultimately feels as callow as its heroine."

=== Accolades ===
Award	Date of ceremony	Category	Recipient(s)	Result	Ref.
Cannes Film Festival	17 July 2021	Caméra d'Or	Sandrine Kiberlain	Nominated	
César Awards	24 February 2023	Most Promising Actress	Rebecca Marder	Nominated	
Lumière Awards	16 January 2023	Best Female Revelation	Rebecca Marder	Nominated	
