= The Night of the 12th =

2022 film by Dominik Moll

- Theatrical release poster
- French: La Nuit du 12
- Directed by: Dominik Moll
- Screenplay by: Gilles Marchand; Dominik Moll
- Based on: 18.3 – Une année à la PJ by Pauline Guéna
- Produced by: Caroline Benjo; Barbara Letellier; Carole Scotta; Simon Arnal
- Starring: Bastien Bouillon; Bouli Lanners; Anouk Grinberg; Théo Cholbi; Johann Dionnet; Thibault Evrard; Julien Frison; Paul Jeanson; Mouna Soualem; Pauline Serieys
- Cinematography: Patrick Ghiringhelli
- Edited by: Laurent Rouan
- Music by: Olivier Marguerit
- Production companies: Haut et Court; Versus Production; Auvergne-Rhône-Alpes Cinéma; RTBF; VOO; BeTV; Proximus
- Distributed by: Haut et Court (France); O'Brother Distribution (Belgium)
- Release dates: 20 May 2022 (Cannes); 13 July 2022 (France); 31 August 2022 (Belgium)
- Running time: 114 minutes
- Countries: France; Belgium
- Language: French
- Box office: $3.8 million

The Night of the 12th (French: La Nuit du 12) is a 2022 mystery thriller film directed by Dominik Moll from a screenplay he co-wrote with Gilles Marchand, based on the 2020 non-fiction book 18.3 – Une année à la PJ by Pauline Guéna. It stars Bastien Bouillon, Bouli Lanners, Anouk Grinberg, Théo Cholbi, Johann Dionnet, Thibault Evrard, Julien Frison, Paul Jeanson, Mouna Soualem and Pauline Serieys. The film follows the investigation into the murder of a young woman in a small town in the French Alps, led by a recently promoted police captain.

The Night of the 12th premiered at the Cannes Film Festival on 20 May 2022. The film was released theatrically in France on 13 July 2022 by Haut et Court and in Belgium on 31 August 2022 by O'Brother Distribution. It received ten nominations at the 48th César Awards, winning six, including Best Film, Best Adapted Screenplay, Best Director for Moll, Best Supporting Actor for Lanners, and Most Promising Actor for Bouillon.

== Plot ==
On the night of 12 October 2016, a police unit in Grenoble throws a retirement party for their captain while celebrating the promotion of his younger replacement, Yohan Vivès. Later that night, in Saint-Jean-de-Maurienne, 21-year-old Clara Royer says goodbye to her friends and leaves the house of her best friend Stéphanie "Nanie" Béguin. As she walks home in the dark, Clara is accosted by a masked assailant who calls her by her name before dousing her with lighter fluid and setting her on fire.

In the morning, Yohan and senior detective Marceau, who are assigned to the case, discover Clara's charred body in a nearby park and notify her parents. When asked by Yohan about Clara's ex-boyfriends, Nanie mentions Wesley Fontana, a former co-worker at a bowling alley in La Toussuire. The next day, Yohan and a colleague, Loïc, question Wesley, who admits that he was sexually involved with Clara but claims that she kept pursuing him even though he had a girlfriend, who later confirms his alibi.

Marceau and Loïc question a contact found on Clara's phone, Jules Leroy, who reveals that he had a casual sexual relationship with her and giggles while they are discussing the way she was killed. Yohan questions Nanie again to divulge the names of Clara's other ex-partners. One of them, Gabi Lacazette, is brought in for questioning and reveals that he wrote a rap song about setting Clara on fire after learning that she was unfaithful to him, though he insists that he is not a violent person.

At the police station, Yohan receives a disposable lighter delivered anonymously inside an envelope. One evening, Yohan and Marceau visit the crime scene, where they meet Denis Douet, an older man who tells them that he found the lighter nearby, while claiming to be one of Clara's exes. The next day, Yohan questions Nanie yet again since she omitted Denis from the list of Clara's partners. Nanie denies that Clara had sex with Denis and becomes upset with Yohan's persistent questions about Clara's relationships with men, tearfully declaring that she was killed because she was a girl.

Clara's father finds a bloodied T-shirt at her makeshift memorial and hands it over to the detectives. The T-shirt belongs to Vincent Caron, who was convicted of domestic violence against his previous partner. During questioning, he admits that he also had an affair with Clara, while his live-in girlfriend Nathalie defends him and provides an alibi for him. After listening to tapped phone conversations in which Vincent is verbally abusive towards Nathalie, Marceau goes to his apartment and physically attacks him until Yohan arrives and intervenes. Marceau is subsequently transferred.

Nearly three years later, an investigating judge asks Yohan to reopen Clara's case. Yohan expresses his frustration with the case, saying that although the killer has not been identified, he feels that all the men he questioned were capable of committing the crime. As the third anniversary of Clara's murder approaches, the judge suggests that Yohan hide a camera in a fake gravestone at her grave, hoping that the culprit will expose himself.

Yohan and a new young recruit, Nadia, stake out Clara's grave at night. The next day, they find that the footage shows an unidentified young man taking off his shirt and singing next to Clara's grave at night. Nadia identifies the man as Mats, who created an online memorial for Clara. He is taken into custody, claiming to have met Clara at the Chambéry hospital. The detectives soon learn that Mats was admitted to the Chambéry psychiatric hospital at the time of the crime and that he became fixated on Clara after reading about her murder.

Disheartened, Yohan asks Nadia if she believes in ghosts, to which she replies that "the dead stay with us forever, and the important things we do are for them". Yohan later writes Marceau an email saying that although Clara's murder remains unsolved, he has high hopes for Nadia.

== Cast ==
- Bastien Bouillon as Yohan Vivès
- Bouli Lanners as Marceau
- Théo Cholbi as Willy
- Johann Dionnet as Fred
- Thibault Evrard as Loïc
- Julien Frison as Boris
- Paul Jeanson as Jérôme
- Mouna Soualem as Nadia
- Pauline Serieys as Nanie
- Lula Cotton-Frapier as Clara Royer
- Charline Paul as Clara's mother
- Matthieu Rozé as Clara's father
- Baptiste Perais as Wesley Fontana
- Jules Porier as Jules Leroy
- Nathanaël Beausivoir as Gabi Lacazette
- Benjamin Blanchy as Denis Douet
- Pierre Lottin as Vincent Caron
- Camille Rutherford as Nathalie Bardot
- David Murgia as Mats
- Anouk Grinberg as the investigating judge

== Release ==
The Night of the 12th premiered in the Cannes Premiere section of the Cannes Film Festival on 20 May 2022. It also screened in the World Cinema section of 27th Busan International Film Festival. The film was released theatrically in France on 13 July 2022 by Haut et Court and in Belgium on 31 August 2022 by O'Brother Distribution. In the United States, it was released in select theaters on 19 May 2023 by Film Movement.

== Reception ==
=== Critical response ===
On the review aggregator website Rotten Tomatoes website, the film holds an approval rating of 94% based on 67 reviews, with an average rating of 7.8/10. The website's critics consensus reads, "A grim, well-crafted thriller, The Night of the 12th takes a finely layered look at the toxic ripple effect of violence."

Jordan Mintzer of The Hollywood Reporter wrote, "Alongside the two leads, the supporting cast of cops and potential culprits is a mix of unfamiliar yet highly credible faces, grounding the action in a gritty and disquieting reality."

Lissa Nesselson of Screen Daily wrote a positive review of the film, writing, "A deft and satisfying police procedural in command of its unusual tone, The Night of the 12th [...] is perfectly cast and constructed with quietly thrilling rigour."

=== Accolades ===
Awards and nominations for The Night of the 12th
Award	Date of ceremony	Category	Recipient(s)	Result	Ref.
Lumière Awards	16 January 2023	Best Film	The Night of the 12th	Won	
Lumière Awards	16 January 2023	Best Director	Dominik Moll	Nominated	
Lumière Awards	16 January 2023	Best Screenplay	Dominik Moll, Gilles Marchand	Won	
Lumière Awards	16 January 2023	Best Cinematography	Patrick Ghiringhelli	Nominated	
Lumière Awards	16 January 2023	Best Actor	Bastien Bouillon	Nominated	
Lumière Awards	16 January 2023	Best Music	Olivier Marguerit	Nominated	
Jacques Deray Prize	4 February 2023		The Night of the 12th	Won	
César Awards	24 February 2023	Best Film	The Night of the 12th	Won	
César Awards	24 February 2023	Best Director	Dominik Moll	Won	
César Awards	24 February 2023	Best Supporting Actor	Bouli Lanners	Won	
César Awards	24 February 2023	Most Promising Actor	Bastien Bouillon	Won	
César Awards	24 February 2023	Best Adaptation	Gilles Marchand, Dominik Moll	Won	
César Awards	24 February 2023	Best Original Music	Olivier Marguerit	Nominated	
César Awards	24 February 2023	Best Sound	François Maurel, Olivier Mortier, Luc Thomas	Won	
César Awards	24 February 2023	Best Cinematography	Patrick Ghiringhelli	Nominated	
César Awards	24 February 2023	Best Editing	Laurent Rouan	Nominated	
César Awards	24 February 2023	Best Production Design	Michel Barthelemy	Nominated	
Magritte Awards	4 March 2023	Best Foreign Film in Coproduction	The Night of the 12th	Won	
Magritte Awards	4 March 2023	Best Actor	Bouli Lanners	Won	
Magritte Awards	4 March 2023	Best Sound	François Maurel, Olivier Mortier, Luc Thomas	Nominated	
