= Full Time (film) =

2021 drama film

- Theatrical release poster
- French: À plein temps
- Directed by: Éric Gravel
- Screenplay by: Éric Gravel
- Produced by: Raphaëlle Delauche; Nicolas Sanfaute
- Starring: Laure Calamy
- Cinematography: Victor Seguin
- Edited by: Mathilde Van de Moortel
- Music by: Irène Drésel
- Production companies: Novoprod Cinéma; France 2 Cinéma; Haut et Court
- Distributed by: Haut et Court
- Release dates: 2 September 2021 (Venice); 16 March 2022 (France)
- Running time: 88 minutes
- Country: France
- Language: French
- Budget: €2.7 million
- Box office: $1.9 million

Full Time (French: À plein temps) is a 2021 French drama film written and directed by Éric Gravel. The film stars Laure Calamy as a single mother who works a demanding job as head maid at a high-end hotel in Paris. The film had its world premiere at the 78th Venice International Film Festival on 2 September 2021.

== Plot ==
Single mother Julie works an exhausting job as head maid at a luxury Parisian hotel. Her frenetic daily routine includes tending to her children Nolan and Chloé, commuting from her remote suburb into Paris, and searching for a better job that leverages her university education.

Her schedule is disrupted by an ongoing transport strike in Paris. She begins frequently arriving late for work and is only able to pick up her children from their nanny, Madame Lusigny, well after dark. With limited transport services, Julie has to hitchhike or pay for expensive taxis. On the move for almost every moment of the day, Julie is constantly on the verge of a breakdown, while awaiting alimony payments from her ex-husband.

She attends two successive job interviews with a marketing firm during working hours, which she accomplishes by asking her co-workers to cover for her. Her absence from work is noted and almost results in her dismissal, though she receives a final warning instead. The next week, escalating riots and traffic jams causes her to be late again and she is barred from entering the hotel. A promised call regarding the outcome from the interview fails to materialise.

The financial and physical struggles of being a single mother finally overwhelm her. Julie gives up on her ambitions and amends her résumé to omit her master's degree, seeking a job at the local supermarket. She belatedly consents to bring her children to the Jardin d'Acclimatation amusement park, fulfilling a longstanding request. While they ride an attraction, she receives a call from the marketing firm offering her the position, which she accepts with tears of joy.

== Cast ==
- Laure Calamy as Julie Roy
- Anne Suarez as Sylvie
- Geneviève Mnich as Madame Lusigny
- Nolan Arizmendi as Nolan
- Sasha Lemaitre Cremaschi as Chloé
- Cyril Gueï as Vincent
- Lucie Gallo as Jeanne Delacroix
- Agathe Dronne as Sophie
- Mathilde Weil as Lydia
- Dana Fiaque as Amina
- Olivier Faliez as Paul, le voiturier
- Marème N'Diaye as Inès
- Irina Muluile as Irina
- Aymeline Alix as Claire
- Carima Amarouche as Mireille

== Production ==
=== Development ===
Laure Calamy and other actresses went through maid service training to prepare for their roles. Calamy underwent a one-day course at Le Bristol Paris hotel to understand the gestures and postures specific to the profession. Through her friend Tiziri Kandi, Calamy was given the opportunity to communicate with exploited chambermaids before filming. Kandi, who is a union leader for the Hôtels de Prestige et Économiques (HPE) division of the General Confederation of Labour (CGT), represented the striking chambermaids of the Ibis Batignolles hotel in Paris. Calamy questioned the striking maids about their physical health concerns, the hellish pace of their work and aspects of their personal lives.

=== Filming ===
The film was shot in Paris and in the Yonne department, including the communes Collemiers, Sens and Pont-sur-Yonne. Julie's house in the film is located in Collemiers, a commune familiar to the director Éric Gravel, who lives in the Sens area, and whose many residents – like Julie – commute to Paris by train every day for work. The station that appears in the film is that of Gare de Pont-sur-Yonne.

== Release ==
Full Time was selected to be screened in the Orizzonti section at the 78th Venice International Film Festival. It had its world premiere at Venice on 2 September 2021. It was theatrically released in France by Haut et Court on 16 March 2022. Music Box Films has given the film a limited theatrical release in the United States beginning in February 2023.

== Reception ==
=== Box office ===
Full Time grossed $1.5 million in France, $36,305 in the United States and Canada, and $362,661 in other territories for a worldwide total of $1.9 million.

In France, the film opened alongside Notre-Dame on Fire, Alors on danse and Three Times Nothing. The film sold 15,157 admissions on its first day, 4,356 of which were preview screenings. It went on to sell 70,803 admissions in its opening weekend, finishing 8th at the box office. At the end of its theatrical run, the film sold a total of 211,394 admissions.

=== Critical response ===
On Rotten Tomatoes, the film holds an approval rating of 98% based on 61 reviews, with an average rating of 8.1/10. The website's consensus reads, "Led by Laure Calamy's gripping performance, Full Time serves as a sobering reminder that just staying financially afloat can sometimes feel like a white-knuckle thriller." According to Metacritic, which assigned a weighted average score of 83 out of 100 based on 15 critics, the film received "universal acclaim". On AlloCiné, the film received an average rating of 4.0 out of 5 stars, based on 29 reviews from French critics.

Reviewing the film following its Venice premiere, Wendy Ide of Screen Daily wrote, "It's a propulsively intense piece of filmmaking - at times a bit like watching a highwire chainsaw juggling act about to go horribly and catastrophically wrong." The Sydney Morning Herald's Paul Byrnes gave the film 4 out of 5 stars, commending Laure Calamy's performance and praising her "extraordinary ability to project warmth, as well as strength. Her character here is down but never out, no matter how hard life pushes her."

William Repass of Slant Magazine gave Full Time 2.5 out of 4 stars, criticising that the film "doesn't have much to say about organized labor, or labor in general, other than that work can be really stressful."

=== Accolades ===
Award	Date of ceremony	Category	Recipient(s)	Result	Ref.
César Awards	24 February 2023	Best Original Music	Irène Drésel	Won	
César Awards	24 February 2023	Best Editing	Mathilde Van de Moortel	Won	
César Awards	24 February 2023	Best Actress	Laure Calamy	Nominated	
César Awards	24 February 2023	Best Original Screenplay	Éric Gravel	Nominated	
Lumière Awards	16 January 2023	Best Actress	Laure Calamy	Nominated	
Lumière Awards	16 January 2023	Best Music	Irène Drésel	Nominated	
Venice Film Festival	11 September 2021	Orizzonti Award for Best Director	Éric Gravel	Won	
Venice Film Festival	11 September 2021	Orizzonti Award for Best Actress	Laure Calamy	Won	
Venice Film Festival	11 September 2021	Orizzonti Award for Best Film	Full Time	Nominated	
