= White Paradise (2022 film) =

2022 film by Guillaume Renusson

- Film poster
- French: Les Survivants
- Directed by: Guillaume Renusson
- Written by: Guillaume Renusson; Clément Peny
- Produced by: Pierre-Louis Garnon; Frédéric Jouve
- Starring: Denis Ménochet; Zar Amir Ebrahimi; Victoire Du Bois
- Cinematography: Pierre Maillis-Laval
- Edited by: Joseph Comar
- Music by: Robin Coudert
- Production companies: Les Films Velvet; WTFilms; Baxter Films
- Distributed by: Ad Vitam
- Release dates: 24 August 2022 (FFA); 4 January 2023 (France)
- Running time: 94 minutes
- Country: France
- Languages: French; Italian
- Budget: €2–2.17 million
- Box office: $415,679

White Paradise (French: Les Survivants) is a 2022 French drama thriller film directed and co-written by Guillaume Renusson in his feature film directorial debut, starring Denis Ménochet, Zar Amir Ebrahimi and Victoire Du Bois. The film made its world premiere in official competition at the Angoulême Francophone Film Festival on 24 August 2022. Ad Vitam released the film theatrically in France on 4 January 2023.

== Plot ==
Samuel is a widower who lives isolated in his chalet in the heart of the Italian Alps. One night, Chehreh, a young Afghan woman takes refuge in his home, trapped by the snow. She wants to cross the mountain to reach France. Samuel does not want trouble but faced with his distress, he decides to help her. Beyond the hostility of nature, they will also have to face the hostility of the locals who are determined to stop Chehreh from crossing the border.

== Cast ==
- Denis Ménochet as Samuel
- Zar Amir Ebrahimi as Chehreh
- Victoire Du Bois as Justine
- Oscar Copp as Victor
- Luca Terracciano as Stefano
- Guillaume Pottier as Cédric
- Roxane Barazzuol as Léa
- Julie Moulier as Driver
- Loïc Corbery as The second cop
- Julie-Anne Roth as The nurse
- Bastien Ughetto as Grégoire

== Production ==
=== Filming ===
Filming took place in the Hautes-Alpes and in the Alpes-de-Haute-Provence in France. Principal photography started in March 2020, but it had to be interrupted on 16 March 2020 due to the COVID-19 pandemic. Filming resumed on 11 January 2021 and wrapped on 12 February 2021.

== Release ==
The film made its world premiere in official competition at the Angoulême Francophone Film Festival on 24 August 2022. It had a limited theatrical release in France by Ad Vitam on 4 January 2023.

== Reception ==
=== Critical response ===
AlloCiné, a French cinema website, gave the film an average rating of 3.5/5, based on a survey of 21 French reviews.

=== Box office ===
In France, White Paradise was released to 120 theaters, where it debuted at number fifteenth at the box office, selling 38,064 tickets. The film sold a total of 81,678 tickets after 8 weeks in French theaters.

=== Accolades ===
Year	Award / Festival	Category	Recipient(s)	Result	Ref(s)
2019	Festival Premiers Plans d'Angers	Audience Award for Best Screenplay for a Feature Film	Guillaume Renusson and Clément Peny	Won	
2019	Festival Premiers Plans d'Angers	Fondation VISIO Award – Screenplay Readings	Guillaume Renusson and Clément Peny	Won	
2022	Angoulême Francophone Film Festival	Best Film	Guillaume Renusson	Nominated	
2023	Rome Independent Film Festival	Best International Feature Film	Guillaume Renusson	Won	
