= Diary of a Fleeting Affair =

2022 film by Emmanuel Mouret

- Theatrical release poster
- French: Chronique d'une liaison passagère
- Directed by: Emmanuel Mouret
- Written by: Pierre Giraud; Emmanuel Mouret
- Produced by: Frédéric Niedermayer
- Starring: Sandrine Kiberlain; Vincent Macaigne
- Cinematography: Laurent Desmet
- Edited by: Martial Salomon
- Production companies: Moby Dick Films; Arte France Cinéma
- Distributed by: Pyramide Distribution
- Release dates: 21 May 2022 (Cannes); 14 September 2022 (France)
- Running time: 100 minutes
- Country: France
- Language: French

Diary of a Fleeting Affair (French: Chronique d'une liaison passagère) is a 2022 French romantic comedy-drama film directed by Emmanuel Mouret.

It premiered on 21 May 2022 at the 75th Cannes Film Festival, where it competed for the Queer Palm. It was released in France on 14 September 2022.

== Cast ==
- Sandrine Kiberlain as Charlotte
- Vincent Macaigne as Simon
- Georgia Scalliet as Louise
- Maxence Tual as Manu
- Stéphane Mercoyrol as Carlos

== Release ==
The film was selected to be screened in the Cannes Premiere section of the 75th Cannes Film Festival, where it had its world premiere on 21 May 2022. The film was theatrically released in France on 14 September 2022 by Pyramide Distribution.

== Reception ==
=== Critical response ===
On the review aggregator website Rotten Tomatoes, the film holds an approval rating of 92% based on 13 reviews, with an average rating of 7.7/10. Diary of a Fleeting Affair received an average rating of 4.0 out of 5 stars on the French website AlloCiné, based on 35 reviews.

=== Accolades ===
Award	Date of ceremony	Category	Recipient(s)	Result	Ref.
Cannes Film Festival	28 May 2022	Queer Palm	Emmanuel Mouret	Nominated	
César Awards	24 February 2023	Best Actor	Vincent Macaigne	Nominated	
Lumière Awards	16 January 2023	Best Actor	Vincent Macaigne	Nominated	
