= Pacifiction =

2022 drama film

- Theatrical release poster
- French: Pacifiction – Tourment sur les îles
- Directed by: Albert Serra
- Written by: Albert Serra
- Produced by: Pierre-Olivier Bardet; Albert Serra; Montse Triola; Dirk Decker; Andrea Schütte; Joaquim Sapinho; Marta Alves; Laurent Jacquemin
- Starring: Benoît Magimel
- Cinematography: Artur Tort
- Edited by: Albert Serra; Artur Tort; Ariadna Ribas
- Music by: Marc Verdaguer; Joe Robinson
- Production companies: Idéale Audience Group (France); Andergraun Films (Spain); Tamtam Film (Germany); Rosa Filmes (Portugal)
- Distributed by: Les Films du Losange (France); Elastica (Spain)
- Release dates: 26 May 2022 (Cannes); 2 September 2022 (Spain); 9 November 2022 (France)
- Running time: 165 minutes
- Countries: France; Spain; Portugal; Germany
- Languages: French; English; Tahitian; Portuguese
- Box office: $298,934

Pacifiction (French: Pacifiction – Tourment sur les îles) is a 2022 political drama film written and directed by Albert Serra, and starring Benoît Magimel. The film premiered at the 2022 Cannes Film Festival, where it competed for the Palme d'Or. The film title is a portmanteau of the words Pacific and fiction.

== Plot ==
"On the French Polynesian island of Tahiti, the High Commissioner of the Republic and French government official De Roller is a calculating man with flawless manners. His somewhat broad perception of his role brings him to navigate the high-end 'establishment' as well as shady venues where he mingles with the locals. A persistent rumour also has been going around: The sighting of a submarine with a ghostly presence could herald the return of French nuclear testing."

== Cast ==
- Benoît Magimel as High Commissioner De Roller
- Pahoa Mahagafanau as Shannah
- Marc Susini as l'amiral
- Matahi Pambrun as Matahi
- Alexandre Mello as le Portugais
- Sergi López as Morton
- Montse Triola as Francesca
- Michael Vautor as le capitaine
- Cécile Guilbert as Romane Attia
- Lluís Serrat as Lois
- Mike Landscape as M. Mike
- Cyrus Arai as Cyrus
- Mareva Wong as la secrétaire
- Baptiste Pinteaux as Olivier

== Release ==
The film screened at the 75th Cannes Film Festival on 26 May 2022. Distributed by Elastica, it was released theatrically in Spain on 2 September 2022. It was released by Les Films du Losange in France on 9 November 2022.

== Reception ==
On Rotten Tomatoes, the film holds an approval rating of 87% based on 70 reviews, with an average rating of 7.7/10. The website's consensus reads, "Narratively sparse and visually vast, Pacifiction is a tsunami of a political thriller that philosophically rewards those willing to weather it." According to Metacritic, which assigned a weighted average score of 75 out of 100 based on 18 critics, the film received "generally favorable reviews".

Reviewing the film following its Cannes premiere, Peter Bradshaw of The Guardian wrote that he was "captivated by the film and its stealthy evocation of pure evil." Christian Blauvelt of IndieWire wrote, "Pacifiction is not a vicarious experience of luxury; it is an experience of life. Set to its own tidal rhythm, it is one of the most beautiful and rigorously introspective movies of this or any year." The Hollywood Reporter's Leslie Felperin called it "Punishingly slow, though not uninteresting." Guy Lodge of Variety wrote, "Provided they stick with the film's luxuriantly gradual pacing... there are rewards here even for more bemused viewers caught in its tide." Nando Salvá of Cinemanía rated the film 4½ out of 5 stars, underscoring the film to be "Romantic. Seductive. Hypnotic. Overwhelming" as a verdict.

=== Top ten lists ===
The film appeared on some critics' top-ten lists of the best films of 2022:

- 1st — Cahiers du Cinéma (staff consensus)
- 1st — ScreenDaily (Jonathan Romney)
- 5th — Artforum (James Quandt)

It also appeared on a number of critics' top-ten lists of the best European films of 2022:

- 1st — Cineuropa (David González)
- 1st — Cineuropa (David Katz)
- 1st — Cineuropa (Alfonso Rivera)
- 2nd — Cineuropa (Martin Kudlac)
- 2nd — Cineuropa (Fabien Lemercier)
- 3rd — Cineuropa (Júlia Olmo)
- 3rd — Cineuropa (Cristóbal Soage)
- 9th — Cineuropa (Vladan Petkovic)

== Accolades ==
Year	Award	Category	Nominee(s)	Result	Ref.
2022	Louis Delluc Prize	Best Film of the Year		Won	
2023	28th Lumière Awards	Best Film		Nominated	
2023	28th Lumière Awards	Best Director	Albert Serra	Won	
2023	28th Lumière Awards	Best Actor	Benoît Magimel	Won	
2023	28th Lumière Awards	Best Cinematography	Artur Tort	Won	
2023	28th Lumière Awards	Best Music	Marc Verdaguer	Nominated	
2023	15th Gaudí Awards	Best Non-Catalan Language Film		Won	
2023	15th Gaudí Awards	Best Director	Albert Serra	Nominated	
2023	15th Gaudí Awards	Best Actor	Benoît Magimel	Nominated	
2023	15th Gaudí Awards	Best Original Screenplay	Albert Serra	Nominated	
2023	15th Gaudí Awards	Best Cinematography	Artur Tort	Won	
2023	15th Gaudí Awards	Best Editing	Albert Serra, Artur Tort, Ariadna Ribas	Nominated	
2023	15th Gaudí Awards	Best Production Supervision	Clàudia Robert	Nominated	
2023	15th Gaudí Awards	Best Art Direction	Sebastian Vogler	Won	
2023	15th Gaudí Awards	Best Costume Design	Práxedes de Villalonga	Nominated	
2023	15th Gaudí Awards	Best Makeup and Hairstyles	Aurélie Vigouroux, Maryline Montibert	Nominated	
2023	15th Gaudí Awards	Best Original Score	Marc Verdaguer, Joe Robinson	Nominated	
2023	10th Feroz Awards	Arrebato Award (Fiction)		Nominated	
2023	48th César Awards	Best Film		Nominated	
2023	48th César Awards	Best Director	Albert Serra	Nominated	
2023	48th César Awards	Best Actor	Benoît Magimel	Won	
2023	48th César Awards	Best Cinematography	Artur Tort	Won	
2023	48th César Awards	Best Original Music	Marc Verdaguer, Joe Robinson	Nominated	
2023	48th César Awards	Best Costume Design	Praxedes de Vilallonga	Nominated	
2023	48th César Awards	Best Production Design	Sebastian Vogler	Nominated	
2023	48th César Awards	Best Sound	Jordi Ribas, Benjamin Laurent, Bruno Tarriere	Nominated	
2023	48th César Awards	Best Visual Effects	Marco del Bianco	Nominated	

== See also ==
- List of French films of 2022
- List of Spanish films of 2022
