= Between Two Worlds (2021 film) =

2021 drama film

- Theatrical release poster
- French: Ouistreham
- Directed by: Emmanuel Carrère
- Screenplay by: Emmanuel Carrère; Hélène Devynck
- Based on: The Night Cleaner by Florence Aubenas
- Produced by: Olivier Delbosc; David Gauquié; Julien Deris
- Starring: Juliette Binoche
- Cinematography: Patrick Blossier
- Edited by: Albertine Lastera
- Music by: Mathieu Lamboley
- Production companies: Curiosa Films; Cinéfrance Studios; France 3 Cinéma; Studio Exception
- Distributed by: Memento Distribution
- Release dates: 7 July 2021 (Cannes); 12 January 2022 (France)
- Running time: 106 minutes
- Country: France
- Language: French
- Box office: $3.9 million

Between Two Worlds (French: Ouistreham) is a 2021 French drama film directed by Emmanuel Carrère, loosely based on Florence Aubenas's 2010 autobiographical book The Night Cleaner. Starring Juliette Binoche, it had its world premiere as the opening film of the Directors' Fortnight section at the 2021 Cannes Film Festival on 7 July 2021.

== Premise ==
Parisian journalist Marianne Winckler goes undercover in the world of temporary and precarious work, applying to work a series of menial jobs including a position as a cleaning lady aboard a ferry service between Ouistreham and Portsmouth.

== Cast ==
- Juliette Binoche as Marianne Winckler
- Hélène Lambert as Christèle Thomassin
- Léa Carne as Marilou
- Évelyne Porée as Nadège Porteur
- Patricia Prieur as Michèle
- Émily Madeleine as Justine Leroy
- Didier Pupin as Cédric
- Louise Pociecka as Louise
- Steve Papagiannis as Steve
- Jérémy Lechevallier as Eric
- Aude Ruyter as Lucie
- Nathalie Lecornu as Nathalie
- Florence Hélouin as Martine
- Jean-Paul Hirsch as le libraire
- Louis-Do de Lencquesaing as Louis-Do
- Charline Bourgeois-Tacquet as Charline

== Release ==
Between Two Worlds was selected to be screened as the opening film in the Directors' Fortnight section at the 2021 Cannes Film Festival. It had its world premiere at Cannes on 7 July 2021. It was theatrically released by Memento Distribution in France on 12 January 2022.

The film was released in the United States by Cohen Media Group on 11 August 2023.

== Reception ==
=== Box office ===
Between Two Worlds grossed $3.1 million in France for a worldwide total of $3.9 million.

=== Critical response ===
On Rotten Tomatoes, the film holds an approval rating of 79% based on 58 reviews, with an average rating of 6.7/10. The site's critics consensus reads: "Led by a typically brilliant performance from Juliette Binoche, Between Two Worlds takes a pointed yet possibly patronizing look at the human face of economic inequality." According to Metacritic, which assigned a weighted average score of 60 out of 100 based on 15 critics, the film received "mixed or average" reviews. Between Two Worlds received an average rating of 3.5 out of 5 stars on the French website AlloCiné, based on 37 reviews.

Anna Smith of Deadline Hollywood wrote, "Between Two Worlds hits all the beats of an arthouse crowd pleaser for audiences who, like Marianne, can go back to their comfortable homes with a renewed appreciation for the people who clean up after them." Ben Kenigsberg of RogerEbert.com called it an "adequate muckraking drama that avoids the hectoring tone of certain recent Ken Loach films." Wendy Ide of Screen Daily wrote, "Certainly, this picture ticks plenty of social realist boxes. But there's a satisfying added depth born out of the persuasively fleshed out performances and the focus on female friendship." Also writing in The Observer, Ide specifically praised the "incendiary, scene-dominating turn from newcomer Hélène Lambert" for giving the film "its jagged, furious energy". Variety's Peter Debruge criticized the film's portrayal of cleaning women and wrote, "It's not clear whether watching Binoche scrub a few toilets is meant to dignify/humanize those stuck doing such chores, or to underscore the lengths to which she'll go as an actor. Filmmakers have been embedding themselves in "invisible" communities for years now — Nomadland director Chloé Zhao has been a pioneer of this approach — and Between Two Worlds feels behind the curve." In a 3-star review, Edward Porter of The Sunday Times lamented that "the script's balance is off: the journalist's ethical dilemmas become too big a part of the drama. The best scenes are those in which she gets to know some of her colleagues and hears their stories."

=== Accolades ===
Award	Date of ceremony	Category	Recipient(s)	Result	Ref.
César Awards	24 February 2023	Best Actress	Juliette Binoche	Nominated	
Lumière Awards	16 January 2023	Best Actress	Juliette Binoche	Nominated	
Lumière Awards	16 January 2023	Best Female Revelation	Hélène Lambert	Nominated	
