= Cécile Guilbert =

French writer and literary critic

Cécile Guilbert (born 1963) is a French writer and literary critic. She studied at Sciences-Po Paris. She has written a number of books on writers who are esprits libres or "free spirits": Saint Simon, Guy Debord, Laurence Sterne and Andy Warhol. She won the Prix Médicis de l'essai for Warhol spirit.She has also written novels such as Le Musée National (2000) and Réanimation (2012). She has written for France Culture, Canal Plus, Monde des Livres and Magazine Littéraire.

As of 2021, Guilbert sits on the jury of the Prix Renaudot.

In 2022, she made her acting debut in Albert Serra's drama film Pacifiction.

== Works ==
- Saint-Simon ou l’encre de la subversion. Gallimard. 1994. ISBN 9782070739325.
- Pour Guy Debord. Gallimard. 1996. ISBN 9782070744428.
- Le musée national. Gallimard. 2000. ISBN 9782070750757.
- L’écrivain le plus libre. Gallimard. 2004. ISBN 9782070770908.
- Warhol spirit. Grasset. 2008. ISBN 9782246733119. (Prix Médicis de l'essai)
- Sans entraves et sans temps morts. Gallimard. 2009. ISBN 9782070122622.
- Réanimation. Grasset. 2012. ISBN 9782070122622.
- La Boîte à lettres. Robert Laffont. 2014. ISBN 9782221146262.
- Sans entraves et sans temps morts II. Grasset. 2015. ISBN 9782246853015.
- Les Républicains. Grasset. 2017. ISBN 9782246852995.
- Écrits stupéfiants. Bouquins. 2019. ISBN 9782221123164.
- Roue libre. Flammarion. 2020. ISBN 9782080207456.
- Feux sacrés. Grasset. 2025. ISBN 9782246814832.
