= Bruno Reidal =

2023 crime drama film

- Theatrical release poster
- Directed by: Vincent Le Port
- Written by: Vincent Le Port
- Produced by: Roy Arida; Thierry Lounas; Pierre-Emmanuel Urcun
- Starring: Dimitri Doré; Jean-Luc Vincent; Roman Villedieu
- Cinematography: Michaël Capron
- Edited by: Jean-Baptiste Alazard
- Production companies: Capricci; Stank; Arte France Cinéma
- Distributed by: Capricci
- Release dates: 12 July 2021 (Cannes); 23 March 2022 (France)
- Running time: 101 minutes
- Country: France
- Language: French
- Budget: €1.5 million
- Box office: $52,584

Bruno Reidal, subtitled Confession d'un meurtrier (English: Confession of a Murderer), is a 2021 French crime drama film written and directed by Vincent Le Port in his feature debut. Based on a real murder case that occurred in rural France in 1905, the film stars Dimitri Doré in the title role. The film premiered in the Critics' Week section of the 2021 Cannes Film Festival, where it competed for the Caméra d'Or and Queer Palm. It was theatrically released in France on 23 March 2022.

== Synopsis ==
On an otherwise ordinary day in 1905, 17-year-old seminarian Bruno Reidal murders a 13-year-old boy in the woods near his village in the Cantal area. He then turns himself in. To understand why he committed the murder, a group of doctors led by Professor Lacassagne investigate the case. They question Bruno and ask him to write an account of his life from childhood through to the day of the crime.

During his childhood, Bruno was physically and sexually abused by his parents and had a distant relationship with his siblings. At some point, dark murderous fantasies had arisen in him. The seminary seemed to be the only way for Bruno to escape from his family and his violent thoughts and feelings. But he couldn't resist the desire to harm or kill his male classmates, and agonized silently in his guilt. He projected his thoughts primarily onto the handsome seminarian Blondel, but chooses François as his victim that day.

== Cast ==
- Dimitri Doré as Bruno Reidal
  - Roman Villedieu as Bruno Reidal, age 10
  - Alex Fanguin as Bruno Reidal, age 6
- Jean-Luc Vincent as Alexandre Lacassagne
- Tino Vigier as Blondel
- Nelly Bruel as the mother
- Ivan Chiodetti as the father
- Dominique Legrand as Doctor Papillon
- Antoine Brunel as Doctor Rousset
- René Loyon as le supérieur
- Rémy Leboucq as the shepherd
- Tristan Chiodetti as François

== Production ==
Bruno Reidal was produced by Thierry Lounas for Capricci and by Roy Arida and Pierre-Emmanuel Urcun for Stank. It was co-produced by Arte France Cinéma. Pre-purchased by Arte and Ciné+, the film received the support of the Nouvelle-Aquitaine and Occitania regions, and the Gan Foundation. The film was also supported by the Centre national du cinéma et de l'image animée (CNC), in the form of an advance on receipts.

=== Development ===
"Discovering this text triggered something in me. I found witnessing such tangible, manifest and yet elusive suffering very unnerving. Behind the monster the newspapers described at the time, there was a young man who had fought his whole life against himself, against his impulses and desires, against the "evil" within him. Suddenly, Bruno no longer fascinated me, but rather moved me."

— Vincent Le Port

In November 2018, Vincent Le Port revealed that it took him 5 years to write the screenplay for his debut feature film, which would be titled Bruno Reidal. It is based on the true story of a 17-year-old peasant who, in 1905, murdered and beheaded a 13-year-old child in the forest bordering the village of Raulhac (Cantal). Le Port first discovered the story in 2011 in Stéphane Bourgoin's book Serial Killers. Le Port explained: "The news story and the person of Bruno immediately fascinated me, as well as the time period and unusual geographical location, the atrocity of the murder which contrasted with the image that everyone had of Bruno (that of a good student, pious, shy, weak), and also a rather inexplicable paradox, namely that the assassin apparently had no remorse, but that he had nevertheless given himself up to the authorities.

In developing the film's screenplay, Vincent Le Port performed archival research, diving into the papers of Alexandre Lacassagne, a forensic physician who founded a school of modern criminology in Lyon. The real name of Bruno Reidal, which is a pseudonym coined by Lacassagne, was Jean-Marie Bladier. Lacassagne interviewed Bladier and took his testimony. Le Port focused heavily on the memoirs Bladier wrote in jail, which totaled around 100 pages. Approximately seven or eight pages were used in the film, which was further reduced during the production process. Le Port edited the pages to cut out repetition, and was forced to remove some elements that would have been too expensive to stage.

=== Casting ===
Le Port and casting director Bahijja El Amrani spent months 8 months searching for the three actors needed to portray Bruno at different ages. They held a casting session for non-professional actors, as they preferred to "find them in local, rural surroundings." However, the session resulted in the casting of only the youngest of the boys, Alex Fanguin, who plays Bruno at the age of six. Fanguin was chosen because he "brought the harshness of this end of the 19th century" and had a "singular and enigmatic gaze." Le Port described Roman Villedieu, who plays Bruno at age 10, as the most "contemporary" of the three.

Le Port became acquainted with Dimitri Doré, who plays Bruno at age 17, through the actor Jean-Luc Vincent, who portrays the doctor Lacassagne. Vincent had seen Doré perform in a play, and advised Le Port to consider him for the role. Le Port was impressed with Doré for being "exactly the same height and weight as the real Bruno Reidal, his high-pitched voice was exactly what I had in mind, the fact that he had never acted in the cinema appealed to me."

=== Filming ===
Filming took place between 10 July and 21 August 2019, between the communes of Campouriez, Thérondels (Aveyron) and Jabrun (Cantal), as well as Autun (Saône-et-Loire), Magnac-Laval, Montrol-Sénard and the forest of Saint-Léger-la-Montagne (Haute-Vienne). Filming took place again in Aveyron, between 11 and 20 December 2019, including in Rodez and at the Saint-Sauveur monastery in Villefranche-de-Rouergue.

=== Music ===
The film's soundtrack features works by composer Olivier Messiaen, including "Louange à l'Éternité de Jésus". According to La Libre, Messiaen's compositions "reinforce the feeling of mystery and unease as we enter the mind of the character".

== Release ==
The film was selected as a special screening in the Critics' Week section at the 74th Cannes Film Festival, where it had its world premiere on 12 July 2021. It had its theatrical release in France through Capricci on 23 March 2022. International sales are handled by Indie Sales. It was released by the independent Canadian distributor Maison 4:3.

== Reception ==
=== Critical response ===
On AlloCiné, the film received an average rating of 4.1 out of 5 stars, based on 27 reviews from French critics.

Reviewing the film following its Cannes premiere, Luc Chessel of Libération called it a "pretty incredible film: first, with a diabolical frankness, which strikes as mastery and commands our admiration, but also, as it progresses, reveals itself much more devious than it seems." Voici described it as a "gripping, awkward and masterful debut feature." Sophie Avon of Sud Ouest wrote that the film has a "sharp beauty that mixes the savagery of the act and the splendor of nature, the atrocity of murder and the fragility of childhood." The film's staging was praised by Stéphanie Belpêche of Le Journal du Dimanche, Thomas Bauras of Première and by Emily Barnett of Marie Claire, the latter of whom wrote, "The pictorial and ultra-precise staging dazzles with its virtuosity." Marie José Sirach of L'Humanité wrote, "There is something fascinating in Vincent Le Port's filming. The beauty of this filmed primitive nature evokes the works of master painters. The compositions of groups, within the school, the family farm, the reconstructions of the black-and-white postcards of yesteryear [...] come as close as possible to the condition of the peasants of that time."

The film was panned by The Playlist's Kevin Jagernauth, who criticized the character development of Bruno: "There is a certain horror about an otherwise banal adolescent who is capable of such harm, but Le Port's film is never insightful enough to draw that out, or rich enough to penetrate beyond its surface layer. It leaves us with a criminal portrait that, for all of its carefully selected hyperfocus, completely fails to see the big picture." Olivier Delcroix of Le Figaro wrote, "Cold, fetishistic, tortured, this stiff psychiatric study is boring to the highest degree."

=== Accolades ===
Award	Date of ceremony	Category	Recipient(s)	Result	Ref.
Angers European First Film Festival	30 January 2022	Jean Carmet Award	Dimitri Doré	Won	
Angers European First Film Festival	30 January 2022	Grand Prix du Jury	Bruno Reidal	Nominated	
Cannes Film Festival	17 July 2021	Caméra d'Or	Bruno Reidal	Nominated	
Cannes Film Festival	17 July 2021	Queer Palm	Bruno Reidal	Nominated	
César Awards	24 February 2023	Best First Film	Bruno Reidal	Nominated	
César Awards	24 February 2023	Most Promising Actor	Dimitri Doré	Nominated	
Lumière Awards	16 January 2023	Best Male Revelation	Dimitri Doré	Won	
Lumière Awards	16 January 2023	Best First Film	Bruno Reidal	Nominated	
Syndicat Français de la Critique de Cinéma	6 February 2023	Best First French Film	Bruno Reidal	Won	

== See also ==
- I Am Pierre Riviere
