= Dominik Moll =

German-French filmmaker (born 1962)

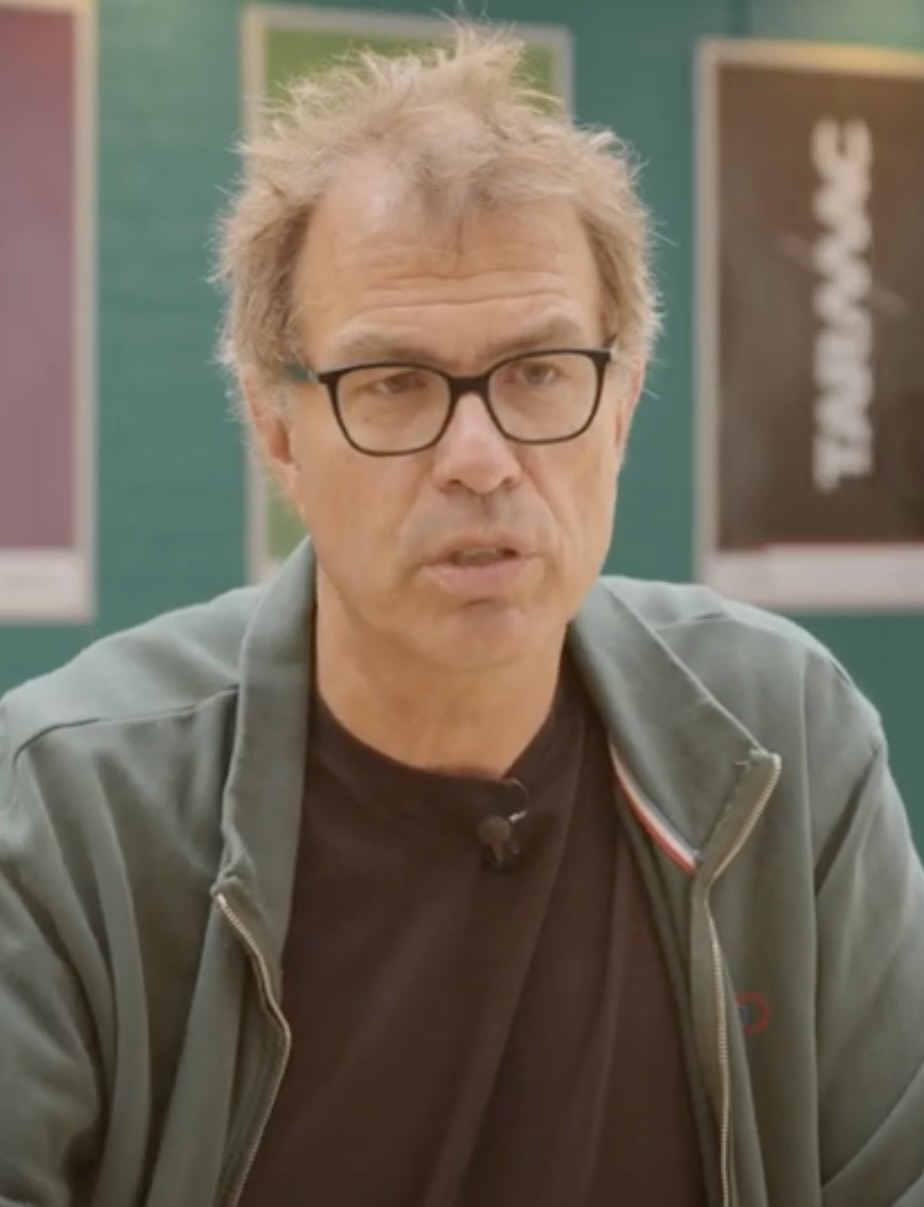
- Dominik Moll in 2024
- Born: 7 May 1962 (age 63); Bühl, Baden-Württemberg, West Germany
- Occupation(s): Film director, screenwriter
- Years active: 1987–present

Dominik Moll (born 7 May 1962) is a German-French film director and screenwriter. He was born in Bühl, West Germany.

In 2001, he won the César Award for Best Director for Harry, He's Here to Help. Harry, He's Here to Help, Lemming and Case 137 were selected to compete for the Palme d'Or at the Cannes Film Festival. In 2023, Moll won the César Award for Best Director for his film The Night of the 12th, which also won Best Film at the 48th César Awards.

== Life and career ==
Moll was born to a German father and a French mother. After spending his childhood in Germany, Moll studied film at the City College of New York and the French National Film School (IDHEC). He then worked as assistant editor, editor and assistant director, among others with Marcel Ophuls and Laurent Cantet. His debut feature film, Intimité, was released in 1994. In 2000, his second feature film, Harry, He's Here to Help, was screened in official competition at the Cannes Film Festival. His third film, Lemming, was chosen to open the Cannes Film Festival in 2005.

At the 48th César Awards in 2023, Moll's film The Night of the 12th won the César Award for Best Film, and earned him the César Award for Best Director as well, the second in his career.

== Filmography ==
=== As filmmaker ===
Year	Title	Notes
1987	Le Gynécologue et sa secrétaire	Short film; also cinematographer
1994	Intimité	
2000	Harry, He's Here to Help	César Award for Best Director; Nominated—BAFTA Award for Best Film Not in the English Language; Nominated—Cannes Film Festival - Palme d'Or; Nominated—César Award for Best Film; Nominated—European Film Award for Best Film
2005	Lemming	Nominated—Cannes Film Festival - Palme d'Or
2011	The Monk	
2016	News from Planet Mars	
2019	Only the Animals	
2022	The Night of the 12th	César Award for Best Film; César Award for Best Director
2025	Case 137	

=== Other credits ===
Year	Title	Credited as		Notes
Year	Title	Screenwriter	Other	Notes
1991	November Days		Yes	Documentary film; assistant editor
1994	Veillées d'armes: histoire du journalisme en temps de guerre		Yes	Documentary film; assistant director
1994	Joyeux Noël		Yes	Short film; editor
1996	Le Cri de Tarzan		Yes	Editor
1997	Les Sanguinaires		Yes	Assistant director
1999	Human Resources		Yes	Assistant director
1999	C'est plus fort que moi		Yes	Short film; assistant director
2009	The Queen of Hearts		Yes	Actor
2010	Black Heaven	Yes		
2013	The Tunnel		Yes	TV series Globes de Cristal Award for Best Television Film or Television Series
2016	Dans la forêt	Yes		
