= Irradiated (film) =

2020 film

- Directed by: Rithy Panh
- Release date: 28 February 2020 (Berlinale)
- Country: Cambodia
- Language: French

Irradiated (French: Irradiés) is a 2020 Cambodian documentary film directed by Rithy Panh. It was selected to compete for the Golden Bear in the main competition section at the 70th Berlin International Film Festival.

The description on Rotten Tomatoes states the film "reflects on the nature of evil through acts of human cruelty across the 20th century".
