= November (2022 film) =

2022 French film

- Official release poster
- French: Novembre
- Directed by: Cédric Jimenez
- Screenplay by: Olivier Demangel
- Produced by: Mathias Rubin; Hugo Sélignac
- Starring: Jean Dujardin; Anaïs Demoustier; Sandrine Kiberlain; Jérémie Renier
- Music by: Guillaume Roussel
- Production companies: StudioCanal; Chi-Fou-Mi Productions; Récifilms; Umedia; France 2 Cinema
- Distributed by: StudioCanal
- Release date: 2022
- Country: France
- Language: French
- Budget: €15 million
- Box office: €17.6 million

November (French: Novembre) is a 2022 French film written and directed by Cédric Jimenez, released on 5 October 2022.

== Synopsis ==
The film shows the investigations and the interventions of the police (in particular of the anti-terrorist sub-directorate) during the five days which followed the attacks of 13 November.

== Cast ==
- Jean Dujardin as Fred
- Anaïs Demoustier as Ines
- Sandrine Kiberlain as Héloïse
- Jérémie Renier as Marco
- Lyna Khoudri as Samia
- Sofian Khammes as Foued
- Stéphane Bak as Djibril
- Victoire Du Bois as Julia
- Raphaël Quenard as Rudy

== Production ==
Filming began on 17 May 2021 and lasted 12 weeks, between Greece, Belgium and Île-de-France. The team notably shoots in Cergy in Val-d'Oise.

== Reception ==
=== Critical response ===
In France, the AlloCiné site offered an average of 3.5 / 5, after listing 35 press reviews.

The film aroused the interest of press critics at the time of its release, as well as generally positive conclusions.

Among the most positive reviews, France Info Culture gave a description of the director's work and method: "The director's method is to base his film on solid documentation and extract a captivating dramaturgy. His characters are well identified, embodied by invested actors, his spectacular staging supported by a dynamic editing." For the review of 20 minutes, “Novembre succeeds in being an action film that lets human beings incarnate in the midst of a terrible drama. That's what makes it strong."

Some of the critics particularly praised the work and style of Cédric Jimenez. The critic of Le Figaro says of the director that he is the "most American of our directors" and that he finds "perhaps [his model] in the Kathryn Bigelow of Zero Dark Thirty". Although more critical, Paris Match places itself in the same logic, speaking of a “solid and strong film, in the continuity of investigative works like Flight 93 or Zero Dark Thirty”.

In the more mixed reviews, the site Ecran Large, the movie was "tense and finely observant during its first half" but "falls apart as it fails to develop a relevant point of view, or to treat all his characters appropriately”. For Liberation, "the film by Cédric Jimenez on the hunt for the coordinator of the 2015 attacks sometimes prefers efficiency to complexity but has managed to find the right tone”.

For Première, “Novembre is actually conceived from his point of view as a director only as a pure action film, operating on the sequence of events (seen only from the police side) as raw as possible. (...) And the result turns out to be extremely effective, like a Zero Dark Thirty stripped of its tragic dimension”.

More negative, Le Monde says “(...) the film does not reveal anything of its characters and does not take more the measure of the event of which it auscultates the police after-the-fact. This is its position, quite respectable, but at the same time its limit." For Les Fiches du Cinéma, “Jimenez approaches 13-November going through the tape to avoid being obscene. But, on this subject, making such images to say nothing is not so much more dignified".

=== Box office ===
On its first day of operation, November made a very good entry with 100,953 tickets sold (including 42,194 previews), for 661 copies. This score allowed the film to reach at the top of the new releases of the week, immediately ahead of Dragon Ball Super: Super Hero and its 67,902 admissions. At the end of one week of release, the film was at the head of the box office with 592,681 entries, ahead of the American thriller Smile (243,762).

In the second week of release, the film achieved 429,138 additional admissions, enabling it to cross the symbolic bar of one million admissions (1,021,819). Despite this score, the film lost its first place in favor of the novelty Simone Veil, A Woman of the Century (486,242). In week 3, the feature retained its second position with 373,241 additional admissions, behind Black Adam (713,308). The following week, the film remained in second position, still behind Black Adam, with a number of tickets sold almost unchanged but somewhat improved: 387,124 admissions. On the other hand, in the fifth week, November fell to fifth place in the French box office with 225,451 additional admissions, behind Paws of Fury: The Legend of Hank (241,102) and ahead of Le Nouveau Jouet (199,366). The film still crossed the symbolic bar of 2 million tickets sold.
