= Denis Ménochet =

French actor (born 1976)

- Ménochet in 2026
- Born: 18 September 1976 (age 50); Enghien-les-Bains, Val-d'Oise, France
- Occupation: Actor
- Years active: 2003–present

Denis Ménochet (French pronunciation: [dəni menɔʃɛ]; born 18 September 1976) is a French actor. Ménochet is best known to international audiences for his role as Perrier LaPadite, a French dairy farmer interrogated by the Nazis for harboring Jews in the 2009 Quentin Tarantino film Inglourious Basterds. In 2023, he won the Goya Award for Best Actor for The Beasts. His performances in Custody, By the Grace of God and Peter von Kant, each saw him receive nominations for the César Award for Best Actor.

== Career ==
Elizabeth Weitzman, a film critic for the New York Daily News, praised Ménochet's work opposite Christoph Waltz in the opening scene of Inglourious Basterds. Weitzman wrote in August 2009, "The terrific opening, for example, does feature a hailstorm of bullets. What you'll remember best, though, is the haunted silence of actor Denis Ménochet, playing a French farmer accused of harboring Jews."

In 2018, Ménochet appeared as Daniel in the film Mary Magdalene, written by Helen Edmundson.

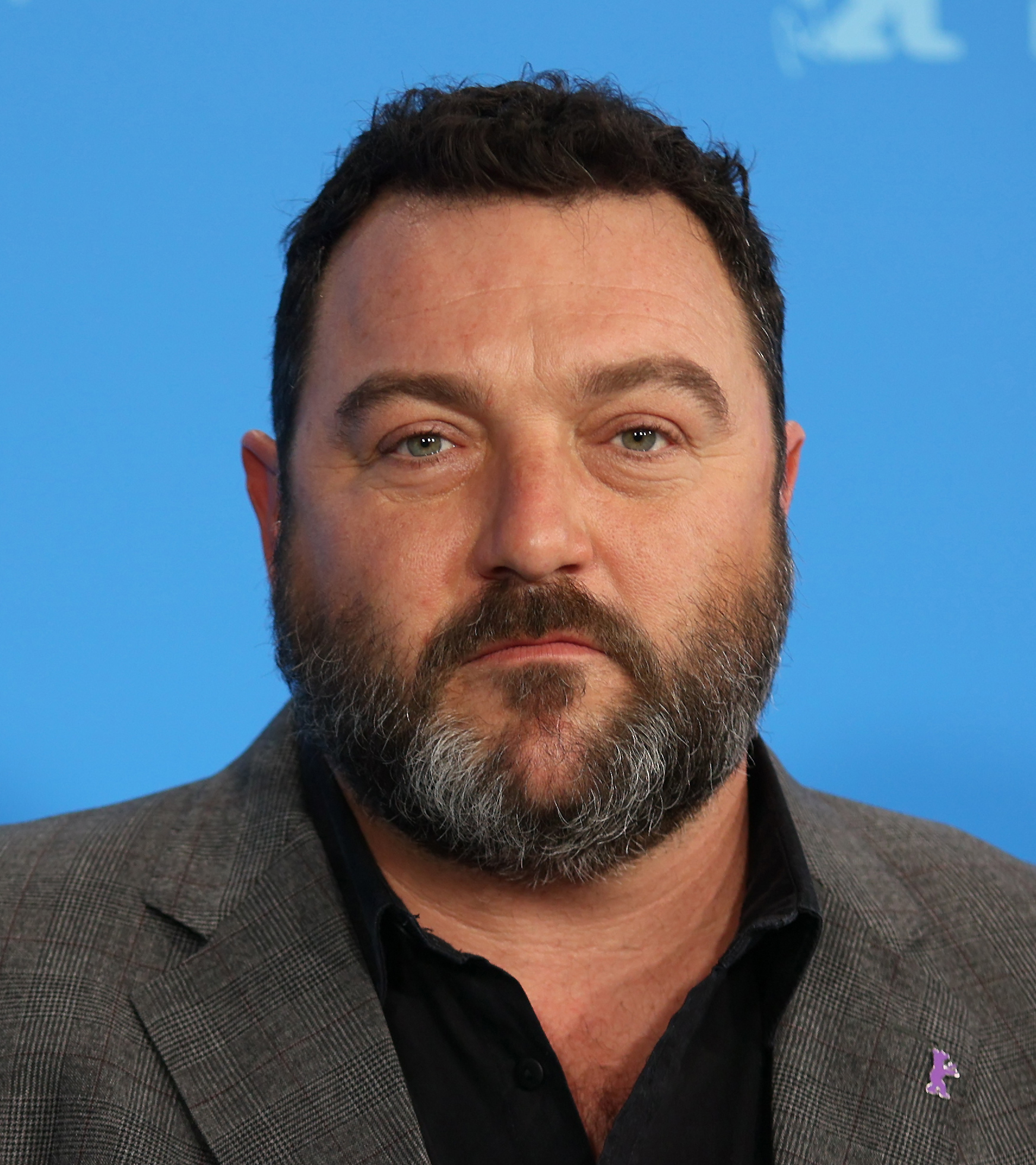
Ménochet in 2022

In 2022, Ménochet co-starred opposite Zar Amir Ebrahimi in the thriller White Paradise, directed by Guillaume Renusson.

In May 2023, Ménochet served as a member of the Feature-Film Jury at the Festival de Cannes, presided over by Ruben Östlund. He stated that performances in films such as Custody (Jusqu’à la garde), By the Grace of God (Grâce à Dieu), White Paradise (Les Survivants), and The Beasts (As Bestas) made him realize the emotional impact his acting could have on audiences.

In 2024, he starred in Chien blanc, directed by Anaïs Barbeau-Lavalette, an adaptation of Romain Gary’s novel White Dog. The film, also featuring Kacey Rohl, deals with racial tensions in Los Angeles in 1968.

== Filmography ==
Year	Title	Role	Director	Notes
2003	Adventure Inc.	Nikos	Dennis Berry	TV series (1 Episode)
2003	Caméra Café	Patrick	Francis Duquet	TV series (2 Episodes)
2004	Mot compte double	Denis	Cécile Vernant	
2004	Automne	The bodyguard	Ra'up McGee	
2004	Split	The man	Matthieu Vollaire	Short
2005	The Moustache	The server	Emmanuel Carrère	
2005	Foon	Harry	Several	
2005	Appel d'air	Vincent	Lucie Duchêne	Short
2005	Les vagues	The coach	Frédéric Carpentier	TV movie
2006	L'État de Grace	Taxi driver	Pascal Chaumeil	TV Mini-Series
2007	Hannibal Rising	Chief of Police	Peter Webber	
2007	La Vie en rose	Journalist in Orly	Olivier Dahan	
2007	Trivial	Jean-Luc	Sophie Marceau	
2007	Mélodie de la dernière pluie		Xavier De Choudens	
2007	Ma place au soleil		Eric de Montalier	
2007	La 17ème marche	Talkie man	Karim Adda	Short
2007	Light My Fire	The man	Matthieu Vollaire	Short
2007	J'ai plein de projets		Karim Adda	Short
2007	Rendez-moi justice	Gilbert Jourdan	Denys Granier-Deferre	TV movie
2007	Poison d'avril	Sound engineer	William Karel	TV movie
2008	La très très grande entreprise	Gilles	Pierre Jolivet	
2008	À sa place	Jean-Michel	Marc Guilbert	Short
2008	Coco Chanel		Christian Duguay	TV movie
2008	Julie Lescaut	Patrick	Eric Summer	TV series (1 Episode)
2008	Duval et Moretti	Alex	Jean-Pierre Prévost	TV series (1 Episode)
2009	Inglourious Basterds	Perrier LaPadite	Quentin Tarantino	
2009	Je te mangerais	Yves's friend	Sophie Laloy	
2009	L'école du pouvoir	The intern	Raoul Peck	TV movie
2009	Brigade Navarro	Captain Le Mat	Philippe Davin	TV series (1 Episode)
2010	Robin Hood	Adhemar	Ridley Scott	
2010	The Round Up	Corot	Rose Bosch	
2010	Pieds nus sur les limaces	Pierre	Fabienne Berthaud	
2010	Joseph et la fille	Franck	Xavier De Choudens	
2010	Agatha Christie's Poirot	Pierre Michel	Philip Martin	TV series (1 Episode)
2011	The Adopted	Alex	Mélanie Laurent	
2011	Forces spéciales	Lucas	Stéphane Rybojad	
2011	Le Skylab	Uncle Roger	Julie Delpy	
2012	In the House	Rapha Artole	François Ozon	
2012	Je me suis fait tout petit	Yvan Le Doze	Cécilia Rouaud	
2012	Ablations	Pastor Cartalas	Arnold de Parscau	Short
2013	Grand Central	Toni	Rebecca Zlotowski	
2013	Eyjafjallajökull	Ezéchiel	Alexandre Coffre	
2013	Le temps de l'aventure	Antoine	Jérôme Bonnell	
2013	Nos héros sont morts ce soir	Victor	David Perrault	
2013	Just Before Losing Everything	Antoine	Xavier Legrand	Short
2013	Faim de vie		Jessica-Salomé Grunwald	Short
2014	Ablations	Pastor Cartalas	Arnold de Parscau	
2014	T'étais où quand Michael; Jackson est mort ?	The man	Jean-Baptiste Pouilloux	Short
2015	The Program	Johan Bruyneel	Stephen Frears	
2015	Norfolk	The man	Martin Radich	
2015	Spotless	Martin Bastière	Several	TV series (10 Episodes)
2016	The Dancer	Ruben - le père de Loïe	Stéphanie Di Giusto	
2016	Assassin's Creed	McGowen	Justin Kurzel	
2017	Custody	Antoine Besson	Xavier Legrand	
2018	Entebbe	Jacques Le Moine	José Padilha	
2018	Mary Magdalene	Daniel	Garth Davis	
2018	The Emperor of Paris	Dubillard	Jean-François Richet	
2019	By the Grace of God	François	François Ozon	
2019	Only the Animals	Michel		
2021	The Mauritanian	Emmanuel	Kevin Macdonald	
2021	The French Dispatch	Prison Guard	Wes Anderson	
2022	Peter von Kant	Peter von Kant	François Ozon	
2022	The Beasts	Antoine	Rodrigo Sorogoyen	
2022	White Dog (Chien blanc)	Romain Gary	Anaïs Barbeau-Lavalette	
2022	White Paradise	Samuel	Guillaume Renusson	
2023	Beau Is Afraid	Jeeves	Ari Aster	
2024	Monsieur Spade	Chief of Police Patrice Michaud	Scott Frank	6 episodes
2024	Rumours	French President Sylvain Broulez	Guy Maddin	

== Accolades ==
Year	Award	Category	Work	Result	Ref.
2010	Screen Actors Guild Awards	Outstanding Performance by a Cast in a Motion Picture	Inglourious Basterds	Won	
2012	Lumière Awards	Most Promising Actor	The Adopted	Won	
2015	ACS Awards	Best Actor	Spotless	Nominated	
2019	César Awards	Best Actor	Custody	Nominated	
2019	Lumière Awards	Best Actor	Custody	Nominated	
2020	César Awards	Best Actor	By the Grace of God	Nominated	
2020	Globes de Cristal Award	Best Actor	By the Grace of God	Nominated	
2022	28th Forqué Awards	Best Actor in a Film	The Beasts	Won	
2022	Tokyo Film Festival	Best Actor	The Beasts	Won	
2023	10th Feroz Awards	Best Actor in a Film	The Beasts	Nominated	
2023	37th Goya Awards	Best Actor	The Beasts	Won	
2023	28th Lumière Awards	Best Actor	The Beasts	Nominated	
2023	CEC Awards	Best Actor	The Beasts	Won	
2023	31st Actors and Actresses Union Awards	Best Actor	The Beasts	Won	
2023	César Awards	Best Actor	Peter von Kant	Nominated	
