= Simone Veil, A Woman of the Century =

- Theatrical release poster
- French: Simone, le voyage du siècle
- Directed by: Olivier Dahan
- Written by: Olivier Dahan
- Produced by: Vivien Aslanian; Romain Le Grand; Marco Pacchioni
- Starring: Elsa Zylberstein; Rebecca Marder; Élodie Bouchez; Judith Chemla; Olivier Gourmet; Mathieu Spinosi
- Cinematography: Manuel Dacosse
- Edited by: Richard Marizy
- Music by: Olvon Yacob
- Production companies: Marvelous Productions; France 2 Cinéma; France 3 Cinéma
- Distributed by: Warner Bros. Pictures
- Release date: 12 October 2022
- Running time: 140 minutes
- Country: France
- Language: French
- Budget: $18 million
- Box office: $19.2 million

Simone Veil, A Woman of the Century (French: Simone, le voyage du siècle) is a French biographical drama film written and directed by Olivier Dahan. The film stars Elsa Zylberstein, Rebecca Marder, Olivier Gourmet and Elodie Bouchez.

== Cast ==
The cast include:

- Elsa Zylberstein as Simone Veil
  - Rebecca Marder as Young Simone Veil (née Jacob)
- Élodie Bouchez as Yvonne Jacob
- Judith Chemla as Milou Jacob
- Olivier Gourmet as Antoine Veil
  - Mathieu Spinosi as Young Antoine Veil
- Pascal Elso as Eugène Claudius-Petit
- Urbain Cancelier as Secretary General Parquet

== Production ==
The film began principal photography on 9 September 2019 and concluded on 4 December 2019, after 13 weeks of filming. It takes place in Paris and La Ciotat and also in Budapest, Hungary.

== Release ==
The film was theatrically released in France by Warner Bros. Pictures on 12 October 2022. The film was released in the United States by Samuel Goldwyn Films.
