= Peter von Kant =

- Release poster in homage to Andy Warhol's poster for Querelle
- Directed by: François Ozon
- Screenplay by: François Ozon
- Based on: The Bitter Tears of Petra von Kant by Rainer Werner Fassbinder
- Produced by: François Ozon
- Starring: Denis Ménochet; Isabelle Adjani; Khalil Gharbia; Hanna Schygulla; Stéfan Crépon; Aminthe Audiard
- Cinematography: Manuel Dacosse
- Edited by: Laure Gardette
- Music by: Clément Ducol
- Production companies: Foz; France 2 Cinéma; Playtime; Scope Pictures
- Distributed by: Diaphana
- Release dates: 10 February 2022 (Berlin); 6 July 2022 (France)
- Running time: 85 minutes
- Country: France
- Languages: French; German
- Budget: €3.1 million

Peter von Kant is a 2022 French comedy drama film written and directed by François Ozon. It is a loose adaptation of Rainer Werner Fassbinder's play The Bitter Tears of Petra von Kant, which he adapted into a film in 1972, but here with the sex of the principal characters changed from female to male. It is Ozon's second cinematic adaptation of a Fassbinder play after Water Drops on Burning Rocks (2000).

The film premiered in competition at the Berlin International Film Festival as its opening film on 10 February 2022.

== Plot ==
In the 1970s in Cologne, Peter von Kant is a filmmaker in his 40s who is experiencing growing success. Having gone through a difficult love affair, he now lives with his assistant Karl, who is totally devoted to him despite being mistreated.

Through Sidonie, a famous actress whose career he had once launched, he meets the young and handsome North African actor Amir. Quickly falling in love with him, Peter takes him under his wing and fast-tracks their relationship, quickly casting him in his new film's lead role. Amir drives Peter wild with jealousy, leading to a series of shouting matches and cruel power plays. Ultimately, the couple hits their breaking point, and Amir returns to his wife, resulting in a dramatic and emotional finale in which Peter rails at his daughter, mother, and best friend and collapses. After his mother soothes him to sleep, the now successful Amir telephones Peter and asks to see him, but Peter finds the strength to turn him down. He approaches his long-suffering assistant Karl and attempts to deepen their relationship, but when the seemingly emotionally overwhelmed Karl draws near him, he spits in Peter's face before walking out on him for good. Alone, Peter watches film he shot of Amir in the early days of their relationship while weeping.

== Cast ==
- Denis Ménochet as Peter von Kant
- Isabelle Adjani as Sidonie
- Khalil Gharbia as Amir
- Hanna Schygulla as Rosemarie
- Stéfan Crépon as Karl
- Aminthe Audiard as Gabrielle

== Production ==
Filming began in March 2021.

== Release ==
In March 2022, Strand Releasing acquired the US rights to the film.

== Reception ==
On the review aggregator website Rotten Tomatoes, the film holds an approval rating of 76%, based on 55 reviews, with an average rating of 6.8/10. The website's consensus reads, "Peter von Kant finds François Ozon making a nervy attempt to build on a Fassbinder classic -- and succeeding more often than he fails." On Metacritic, the film has a weighted average score of 63 out of 100, based on 19 critics, indicating "generally favorable reviews".

Filmmaker John Waters named it his favorite film of 2022, saying "Fassbinder’s classic lesbian melodrama is appropriated and remade as a gay Frenchman’s love letter to the original version."
