= Forever Young (2022 film) =

2022 film

- Theatrical release poster
- Directed by: Valeria Bruni Tedeschi
- Written by: Noémie Lvovsky; Caroline Deruas-Garrel; Valeria Bruni Tedeschi
- Produced by: Alexandra Henochsberg
- Starring: Nadia Tereszkiewicz; Louis Garrel; Micha Lescot
- Cinematography: Julien Poupard
- Edited by: Anne Weil
- Production companies: Ad Vitam Production; Agat Films; Arte France Cinéma; Bibi Film
- Distributed by: Ad Vitam Distribution
- Release dates: 22 May 2022 (Cannes); 16 November 2022 (France)
- Running time: 125 minutes
- Countries: France; Italy
- Language: French
- Box office: $1.9 million

Forever Young (French: Les Amandiers) is a 2022 French-Italian comedy-drama film directed by Valeria Bruni Tedeschi. It was nominated for the Palme d'Or at the 2022 Cannes Film Festival. It is a semi-autobiographical account of Tedeschi's experiences as a young actress in the 1980s.

== Plot ==
Set in the late 1980s, the film follows a group of young actors who enter into Les Amandiers, the prestigious acting school founded by Patrice Chéreau and Pierre Romans. Over the course of a few months, these young people form new friendships, discover the realities of love and come of age, all set to the backdrop of a changing culture.

== Cast ==
- Nadia Tereszkiewicz as Stella
- Sofiane Bennacer as Étienne
- Louis Garrel as Patrice Chéreau
- Micha Lescot as Pierre Romans
- Clara Bretheau as Adèle
- Vassili Schneider as Victor
- Eva Danino as Claire
- Oscar Lesage as Stéphane
- Sarah Henochsberg as Laurence
- Liv Henneguier as Juliette
- Baptiste Carrion-Weiss as Baptiste
- Alexia Chardard as Camille
- Léna Garrel as Anaïs
- Noham Edje as Franck
- Suzanne Lindon as The Waitress
- Franck Demules as The Guardian
- Isabelle Renauld as Chéreau's Assistant
- Sandra Nkaké as Susan
- Bernard Nissille as Gaspard
- Lolita Chammah as Costume Designer (non-speaking)

== Release ==
The film was screened as the closing film at the Rome Film Festival 2023.

== Controversy ==
In November 2022, the newspaper Le Parisien reported that Sofiane Bennacer, the male star of the film, had been indicted in October for sexual and physical abuse against multiple women. In response, the Académie des Arts et Techniques du Cinéma chose to remove Bennacer from their annual Revelations List, and multiple cinemas cancelled their screenings of the film. The women also denounced the director Valeria Bruni Tedeschi, alleging that she had created an atmosphere of omertà on the set of the film. Bruni Tedeschi admitted to being aware of the rumors surrounding Bennacer, but decided to give him the part anyway.

Bennacer denied the allegations of abuse, posting a message on his Instagram account: "Does the presumption of innocence still exist? Or are we in a state of lawlessness, a state where a simple baseless accusation can destroy someone's life?" Bruni Tedeschi, who at the time was Bennacer's partner, denounced the allegations as a "media lynching." Carla Bruni, the younger sister of Bruni Tedeschi, also denounced the allegations on the grounds of "presumption of innocence."
