= Tanguy Viel =

French writer

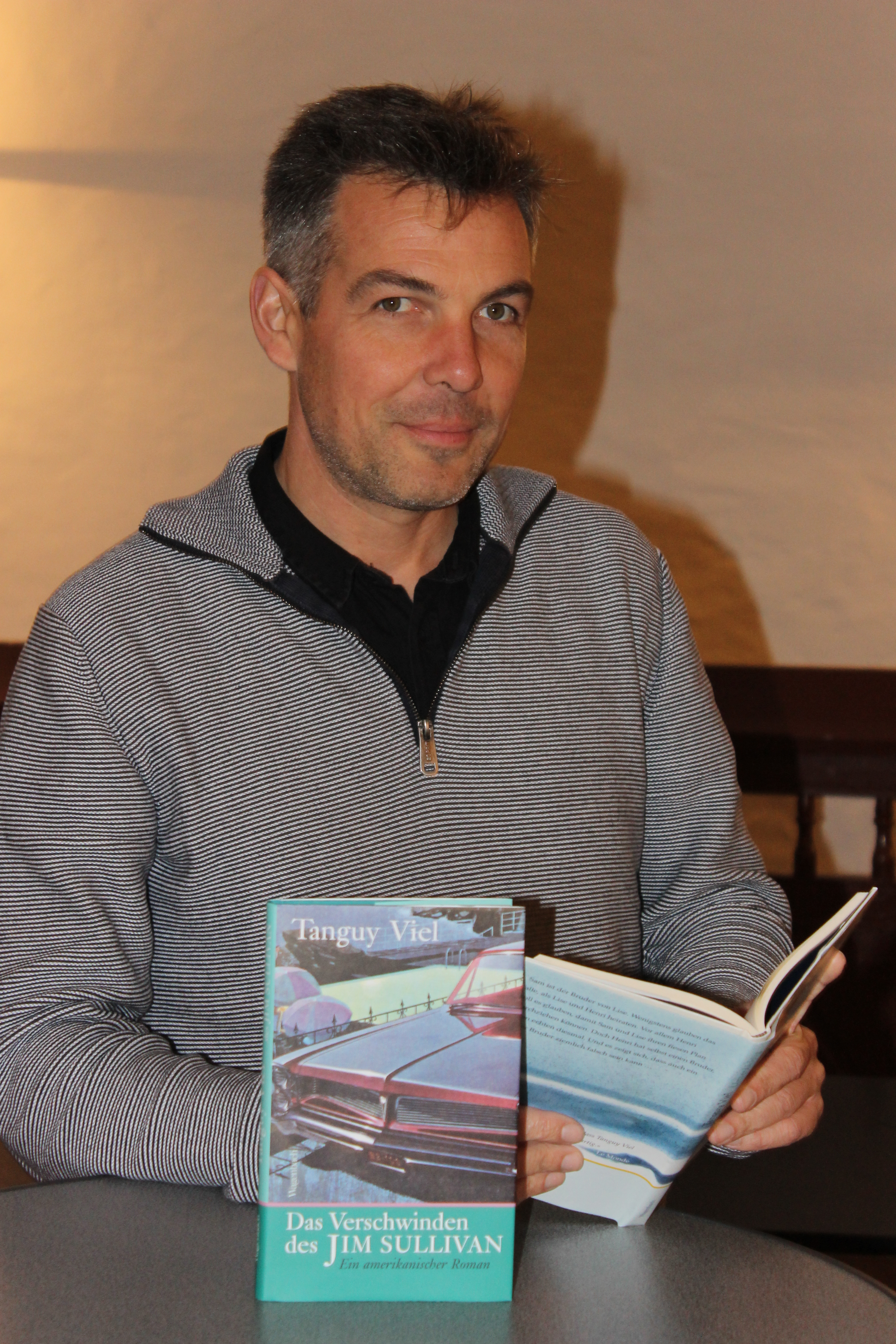
Tanguy Viel at a reading in Osnabrück, Germany, in November 2015.

Tanguy Viel (born 7 July 1973, Brest, France) is a French writer.

A writer-in-residence at the Villa Medici in 2003–2004, Viel was awarded the Prix Fénéon and the Prix littéraire de la vocation for his novel L'absolue perfection du crime.

He also won the Grand prix RTL-Lire for Article 353 du Code pénal in 2017. Other Press in New York published the translation by William Rodarmor in March 2019.

La fille qu'on appelle was one of nine novels in the second selection for the 2021 Prix Goncourt.

== Books ==
- 1998 : Le Black Note, Éditions de Minuit ISBN 2-7073-1631-8
- 1999 : Cinéma, Éditions de Minuit ISBN 2-7073-1670-9
- 2000 : Tout s'explique: réflexions à partir d'« Explications » de Pierre Guyotat, Inventaire/Invention ISBN 2-914412-04-5
- 2001 : L'Absolue perfection du crime, Éditions de Minuit ISBN 2-7073-1765-9
- 2002 : Maladie, Inventaire/Invention ISBN 2-914412-19-3
- 2006 : Insoupçonnable, Éditions de Minuit ISBN 2-7073-1941-4
- 2009 : Paris-Brest, Éditions de Minuit ISBN 9782707320636
- 2009 : Cet homme-là, Éditions Desclée de Brouwer ISBN 978-2-220-06128-3
- 2010 : Hitchcock par exemple, illustrations by Florent Chavouet, Editions Naïve ISBN 978-2-35021-212-8
- 2010 : Un jour dans la vie, Librairie Passages ISBN 978-2-84109-027-3
- 2013 : La Disparition de Jim Sullivan, Éditions de Minuit ISBN 978-2-7073-2294-4
- 2017 : Article 353 du Code pénal, Éditions de Minuit ISBN 978-2-7073-4307-9; translated into English in 2019 by William Rodarmor as Article 353, Other Press ISBN 978-1-59051-933-2
- 2021 : La fille qu'on appelle, Éditions de Minuit ISBN 978-2-7073-4732-9
