= Ducournau =

Ducournau is a French surname. Notable people with the surname include:

- Gilbert Ducournau (born 1992), Venezuelan–French cyclist
- Julia Ducournau (born 1983), French film director and screenwriter
