= Finnegan Oldfield =

French-British actor (born 1991)

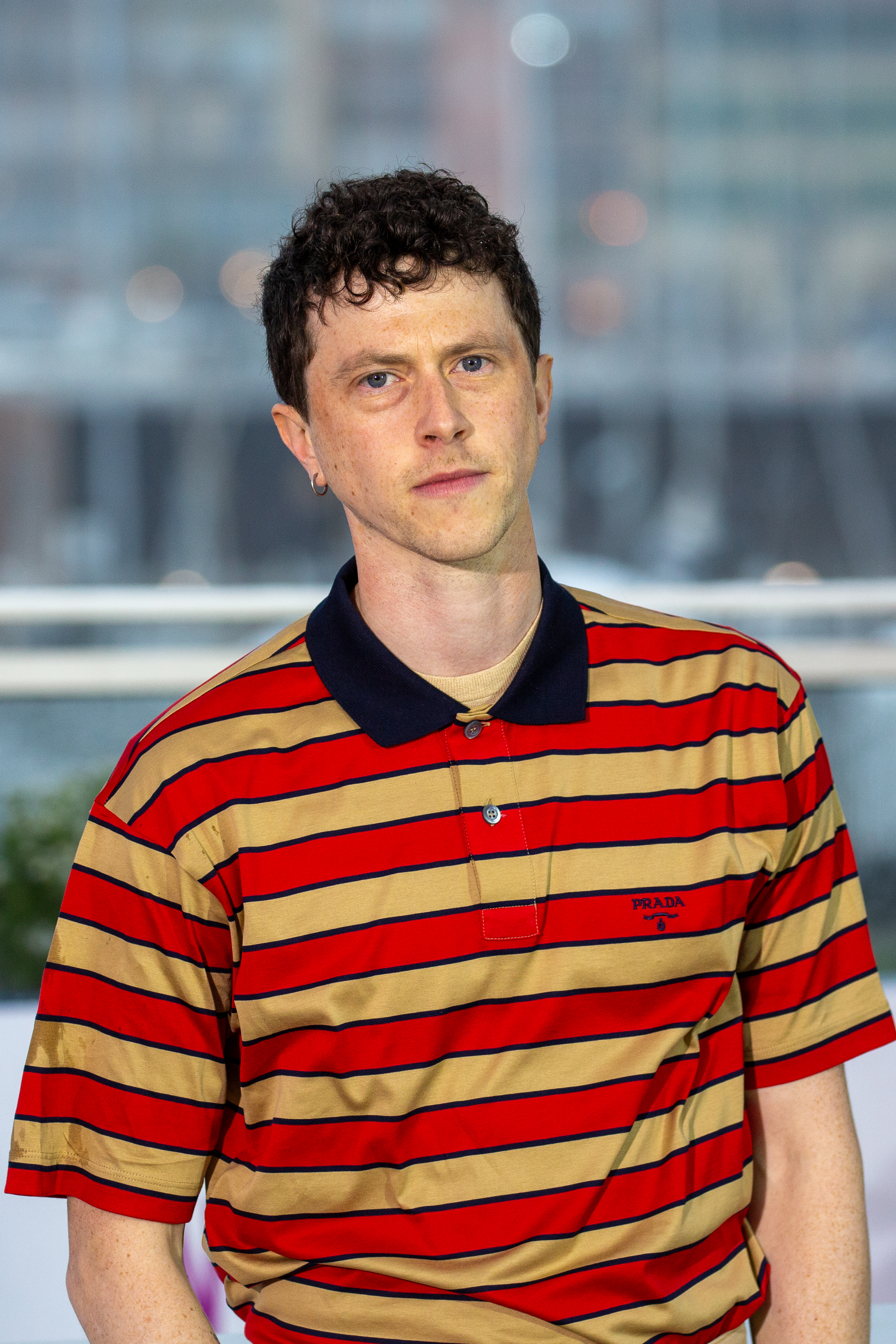
- Oldfield at the 2025 Cannes Film Festival
- Born: 10 January 1991 (age 35); Paris, France
- Occupation: Actor
- Years active: 2003–present

Finnegan Oldfield (born 10 January 1991) is a French-British actor, who has appeared in more than thirty films since 2003.

== Background ==
Finnegan Oldfield was born in 1991 in Paris, France. His mother is French and father English.

== Career ==
In 2005, age 14, Oldfield landed the lead role in the TV film L'Île Atlantique. He dropped out of school at the age of 15.

Oldfield received a César nomination in 2016 for Les Cowboys and in 2018 for Reinventing Marvin.

== Filmography ==
Year	Title	Role	Director	Notes
2003	L'île atlantique	Jean-Baptiste Seignelet	Gérard Mordillat	TV movie
2005	P.J.	Lionel	Gérard Vergez	TV series (1 episode)
2007	La commune	François Lazare	Philippe Triboit	TV series (3 episodes)
2008	Behind the Walls	The beggar	Christian Faure	
2010	Spiral	Dylan	Jean-Marc Brondolo	TV series (5 episodes)
2011	Nobody Else But You	Richi	Gérald Hustache-Mathieu	
2011	Mineurs 27	Stanislas Casarelli	Tristan Aurouet	
2011	Johnny	Johnny	Bruno Ballouard	Short
2012	Calm at Sea	Gilbert Brustlein	Volker Schlöndorff	
2012	It's Not a Cowboy Movie (Ce n'est pas un film de cow-boys)	Vincent	Benjamin Parent	Short; Clermont-Ferrand International Short Film Festival - Best Actor
2013	The Marchers	Radio Host	Nabil Ben Yadir	
2013	Trucs de gosse	Matthieu	Émilie Noblet	Short
2013	Le quepa sur la vilni !	Tarzan	Yann Le Quellec	Short
2013	Désolée pour hier soir	Jeremy	Hortense Gélinet	Short
2014	Geronimo	Nikis Scorpion	Tony Gatlif	
2014	Weekends in Normandy	Erwan	Anne Villacèque	
2014	Lili Rose	The pump attendant	Bruno Ballouard	
2014	À toute épreuve	Lebars	Antoine Blossier	
2014	Mademoiselle	Young man	Guillaume Gouix	Short
2014	Panda	The boy	Anthony Lapia	Short
2014	La traversée	Lucas	Thibaut Wohlfahrt	Short
2014	Ce monde ancien	Vincent	Idir Serghine	Short
2014	La grenouille et Dieu	The boy	Alice Furtado	Short
2014	Ceux qui dansent sur la tête	Frenzy	Magaly Richard-Serrano	TV movie
2014	Braquo	Young robber	Frédéric Jardin	TV series (1 episode)
2015	Les Cowboys	Georges Balland	Thomas Bidegain	Nominated - César Award for Most Promising Actor
2015	The Wakhan Front	Patrick Mercier	Clément Cogitore	
2016	Bang Gang (A Modern Love Story)	Alex	Eva Husson	Nominated - Lumière Award for Best Male Revelation
2016	Nocturama	David	Bertrand Bonello	
2016	Heal the Living	Maxime	Katell Quillévéré	
2016	A Woman's Life	Paul de Lamare	Stéphane Brizé	
2016	Demain si j'y suis	Chantal	Émilie Noblet	TV series (1 episode)
2017	Reinventing Marvin	Marvin Bijoux	Anne Fontaine	Nominated - César Award for Most Promising Actor; Nominated - Lumière Award for Best Male Revelation
2017	Promise at Dawn	Capitaine Langer	Éric Barbier	
2018	Le poulain	Arnaud Jaurès	Mathieu Sapin	
2018	Cross	Mokrane	Idir Serghine	Short
2019	Exfiltrés	Gabriel	Emmanuel Hamon	
2020	Selfie		Thomas Bidegain	Post-Production
2020	Free Like Air	Vincent	Abdolreza Kahani	Pre-Production
2020	Gagarine	Dali	Fanny Liatard and Jérémy Trouilh	
2021	Gone for Good (Disparu à jamais)	Guillaume Lucchesi	Juan Carlos Medina	TV series (5 episodes)
2022	Corsage	Louis Le Prince	Marie Kreutzer	
2023	Infested	Jordy	Sébastien Vaniček	
2025	Alpha †		Julia Ducournau	Post-production
TBA	Melpomene †		Charlotte Dauphin	Post-production
TBA	Couture †		Alice Winocour	Post-production
