= Ella Rumpf =

Swiss actress (born 1995)

- Rumpf in 2026
- Born: 4 February 1995 (age 31); Paris, France
- Education: Public Swiss School. Rudolf Steiner School. Giles Foreman Centre for Acting.
- Occupation: Actress
- Years active: 2011–present

Ella Rumpf (born 4 February 1995) is a Swiss actress, best known for her role as Alexia in the 2016 horror drama film Raw, which won the Sutherland Trophy at the 2016 BFI London Film Festival. Her other notable roles include, critical acclaimed Tiger in Tiger Girl (2017) and Hanna in The Divine Order (2017), the Swiss entry for the Best Foreign Language Film at the 90th Academy Awards.

== Life and career ==
Ella Rumpf was born in Paris and grew up in Zurich, Switzerland. Her father is a family counselor and her mother a teacher and lecturer. Rumpf went to the Steiner school and had her first taste of acting by winning the lead role in Romeo and Juliet at 14. She appeared in her debut film at age 16 called Summer Outside in 2011 directed by Friederike Jehn.

Rumpf won the role of Ali in the multi-award-winning feature film War (Chrieg), by Simon Jaquemet in 2014 and was nominated for Best Supporting Actress at the Swiss Film Awards. She shaved her head for the role. She attended the Giles Foreman Center for Acting in London from 2013–2015 after completing her studies at the Zurich University of Applied Sciences in 2013.

Ella Rumpf starred alongside Garance Marillier in Raw (2016). In 2017, she played the lead role in Tiger Girl and a supporting role in The Divine Order (Die göttliche Ordnung). In 2022, Rumpf appeared in the HBO television series Tokyo Vice, directed by Michael Mann and written by J.T. Rogers.

In 2023, Rumpf played the main role as Marguerite in the film Marguerite's Theorem directed by Anna Novion. It premiered at the 76th Cannes Film Festival. In this role, she stars as a talented graduate student at a French École Normale Supérieure as she attempts to prove the Goldbach's conjecture together with her fellow student Lucas (Julien Frison, a graduate from the Académie Comédie-Française) under the guidance of their professor Laurent Werner (Jean-Pierre Darroussin). In 2024, she received the Lumière Award for Best Female Revelation for her performance.

She speaks Swiss German and French at a native level, and is fluent in German and English.

== Filmography ==
=== Film ===
Year	Title	Role	Notes
2011	Summer Outside	Mia	
2014	War	Ali	
2016	Raw	Alexia	
2017	Tiger Girl	Tiger	
2017	The Divine Order	Hanna	
2018	Asphaltgorillas	Marie	
2019	The Space Between the Lines	Adrienne	
2019	Sympathy for the Devil	Boba	French title: Sympathie pour le diable
2020	Lindenberg! Mach dein Ding	Susanne	
2021	Soul of a Beast	Corey	
2023	Northern Comfort	Coco	
2023	Marguerite's Theorem	Marguerite Hoffmann	
2025	Love Letters	Céline	
2025	Novak	Louise	
2025	Couture	Angèle	

=== Television ===
Year	Title	Role	Notes
2016	Tatort	Ava Fleury	
2017	Für dich dreh ich die Zeit zurück	Helena	Television film
2020	Freud	Fleur Salomé	Main role
2021	Succession	Contessa	Guest role, 2 episodes
2022	Tokyo Vice	Polina	Main role, 8 episodes
2025	The Sandman	Eurydice	Episode: "The Song of Orpheus"

== Awards and nominations ==
Year	Award	Category	Nominated work	Result
2015	Swiss Film Award	Best Supporting Actress	War	Nominated
2020	Shooting Stars Award			Won
2024	César Awards	Best Female Revelation	Marguerite's Theorem	Won
2024	Swiss Film Awards	Quartz Award for Best Actress	Marguerite's Theorem	Won
