= The Dancer (2016 film) =

2016 film by Stéphanie Di Giusto

- Theatrical release poster
- French: La Danseuse
- Directed by: Stéphanie Di Giusto
- Screenplay by: Stéphanie Di Giusto; Sarah Thiebaud; Thomas Bidegain (Note: Collaboration)
- Based on: Loïe Fuller: Danseuse de la Belle Époque by Giovanni Lista
- Produced by: Alain Attal; Emma Javaux; Marie Jardillier
- Starring: Soko; Gaspard Ulliel; Mélanie Thierry; Lily-Rose Depp; François Damiens; Louis-Do de Lencquesaing; Amanda Plummer; Tamzin Merchant; Will Houston; Denis Ménochet
- Cinematography: Benoît Debie
- Edited by: Géraldine Mangenot
- Music by: Max Richter
- Production companies: Les Productions du Trésor; Wild Bunch; Orange Studio; Les Films du Fleuve; Sirena Film; VOO; BeTV; RTBF
- Distributed by: Wild Bunch (France); Lumière (Belgium); Film Distribution Artcam (Czech Republic)
- Release dates: 13 May 2016 (Cannes); 28 September 2016 (France and Belgium); 19 January 2017 (Czech Republic)
- Running time: 108 minutes
- Countries: France; Belgium; Czech Republic
- Languages: French; English
- Budget: $8 million
- Box office: $2 million

The Dancer (French: La Danseuse) is a 2016 biographical historical drama film about dancer Loie Fuller, directed by Stéphanie Di Giusto from a screenplay she co-wrote with Sarah Thiebaud and Thomas Bidegain, based on the novel Loïe Fuller: Danseuse de la Belle Époque by Giovanni Lista. The film stars Soko, Gaspard Ulliel, Mélanie Thierry, Lily-Rose Depp, François Damiens, Louis-Do de Lencquesaing, and Denis Ménochet. The film is a co-production between France, Belgium and Czech Republic.

The film made its world premiere in the Un Certain Regard section of the 2016 Cannes Film Festival. It was released theatrically on 28 September 2016 in France by Wild Bunch and in Belgium by Lumière, and on 19 January 2017 in the Czech Republic by Film Distribution Artcam.

== Plot ==
After the death of her gold prospector father, 25-year-old Marie-Louise leaves her life in the American West to join her mother in New York and pursue her heart's dream - becoming an actress. There was nothing in her background to prepare Louise Fuller to become the toast of the Folies Bergère in Paris and stages across the world.

Then she created the 'Serpentine Dance’ in 1887.

One night on stage, becoming tangled in her long dress, she avoids falling by spinning her costume fabric into a graceful, magical gesture: thus the "Serpentine Dance" is born.

The audience - shocked, then overwhelmed - calls out for more.

Marie-Louise has become Loïe Fuller. She embarks on a new, hectic life, leaving New York, where imitators try to steal her radical innovations, for Paris.

At the Folies Bergère, she dazzles the capital, and illustrious admirers fall at her feet. Toulouse Lautrec, the Lumière Brothers, Rodin, are among the many artists Loïe works with and inspires as her acclaim and renown grows. Becoming the 'Electric Fairy' becomes an icon, the blazing symbol for a generation of artists.

But fame isn't everything.

An encounter with the young, spellbinding Isadora Duncan disrupts her turbulent love affair with Loïe and her complex relationship with her devoted assistant Gabrielle, and risk the very essence of Loïe's art.

== Cast ==
- Soko as Loie Fuller
- Gaspard Ulliel as Louis
- Mélanie Thierry as Gabrielle
- Lily-Rose Depp as Isadora Duncan
- François Damiens as Marchand
- Louis-Do de Lencquesaing as Armand
- Amanda Plummer as Lili
- Denis Ménochet as Ruben
- Tamzin Merchant as Kate
- Will Houston as Rud
- Shimehiro Nishikawa as Sada Yacco
- Nadia Tereszkiewicz as a dancer

== Production ==
In April 2015, it was reported that Wild Bunch had sold the international rights to Stéphanie Di Giusto's feature film directorial debut, The Dancer, about the legendary dancer Loie Fuller and her peer Isadora Duncan, starring Soko as Loie Fuller and Elle Fanning as Isadora Duncan. In September 2015, it was announced that Fanning had been replaced by Lily-Rose Depp, and that the cast also included Gaspard Ulliel, Melanie Thierry, Francois Damiens, and Louis-Do de Lencquesaing. Nadia Tereszkiewicz had her first screen role as an extra in The Dancer.

Di Giusto, Thomas Bidegain and Sarah Thiebaud wrote the script, with Alain Attal producing the film through Les Productions du Trésor, along with Wild Bunch, Belgium's Les Films du Fleuve, and Czech Republic's Sirena Film. The score was composed by Max Richter.

Jody Sperling served as creative consultant for the film, choreographer for Loie's dances and was also Soko's personal dance coach. Soko trained 7 hours a day for two months and did not use a body double in the film. The dance scenes were performed by herself.

Speaking of Loie Fuller's relationship with Louis d'Orsay portrayed in the film, Di Giusto said; "I ended up taking a few liberties with the truth, such as inventing the character of Louis d'Orsay, played by Gaspard Ulliel. I needed a masculine presence in the film, which is otherwise filled with women. Loïe Fuller was gay and it was important for me not to make that the subject of the film. Louis d'Orsay is a moving character: he is the film's sacrificed man."

=== Filming ===
Principal photography on the film began on 28 September 2015, and wrapped up on 10 December 2015. Filming took place in France and the Czech Republic.

Di Giusto wanted to have two shots of Soko crossing the Atlantic on a boat, but it was not possible due to the film's low budget, so in February 2016 she embarked on a ferry with Soko and the producers Marie Jardillier and Emma Javaux and shot the scenes without any permit, just with a camera and Soko.

== Reception ==
On Rotten Tomatoes, the film has an approval rating of 59% based on reviews from 29 critics. On Metacritic it has a score of 44% based on reviews from 7 critics, indicating "mixed or average reviews".

AlloCiné, a French cinema website, gave the film an average rating of 3.4/5, based on a survey of 30 French reviews.

Following the film's screening at the Cannes Film Festival, Jay Weissberg of Variety said the film was "unnecessary" and a "formulaic biopic".

Zhuo-Ning Su of The Film Stage wrote; "The cast is solid all-around. In the lead role, Soko has both the willful masculinity and a feminine vulnerability down. Playing Louis, Ulliel is his usual charismatic self, exuding an effortless, pansexual allure that enriches a rather underwritten character infinitely. And though she only appears later in the film, Depp positively dazzles as Isadora. With her elfin litheness and an almost contemptuous self-assuredness, she owns the screen during every appearance. Ultimately, The Dancer doesn't venture from patterns of traditional biopics far enough to be called inspired, but it delivers a spirited, fully committed portrayal that allows you to observe a quintessential artist from the outside in."

Katie Walsh of Los Angeles Times wrote that The Dancer is "a bold and assured film, wildly creative and sensual, that it feels far more sophisticated than a debut, and signals Di Giusto as one to watch."

== Accolades ==
Year	Award / Film Festival	Category	Recipients	Result	Ref
2016	Cannes Film Festival	Un Certain Regard	Stéphanie Di Giusto	Nominated	
2017	César Awards	Best Actress	Soko	Nominated	
2017	César Awards	Best Supporting Actress	Mélanie Thierry	Nominated	
2017	César Awards	Most Promising Actress	Lily-Rose Depp	Nominated	
2017	César Awards	Best First Feature Film	Stéphanie Di Giusto, Alain Attal	Nominated	
2017	César Awards	Best Costume Design	Anaïs Romand	Won	
2017	César Awards	Best Production Design	Carlos Conti	Nominated	
2017	Lumière Awards	Best Actress	Soko	Nominated	
2017	Lumière Awards	Best Female Revelation	Lily-Rose Depp	Nominated	
2017	Lumière Awards	Best First Film	Stéphanie Di Giusto	Nominated	
2017	Lumière Awards	Best Cinematography	Benoît Debie	Nominated	
