= Garance Marillier =

French actress (born 1998)

- Born: 11 February 1998 (age 28); Paris, France
- Occupation: Actress
- Years active: 2011–present

Garance Marillier (born 11 February 1998) is a French actress. She is known for her lead role in Raw released in 2016.

== Early life ==
Prior to becoming an actress she learned the trombone and classical percussion at the Conservatoire of the 11th arrondissement, Paris. In 2009 she started theater at the Dyonis company, then joined the Cours Florent in 2010 and the Ecole du Jeu in 2012.

== Career ==
Marillier began her acting career in 2011 by playing Justine in the short movie Junior by Julia Ducournau. The film was selected for viewing at the Critics Week at the Cannes festival. The next year Garance appeared in the short movie It’s Not a Cowboy Film in 2012 which was again selected to be screened at Cannes. She continued to star in short movies every year until she landed the lead role of Justine in Raw in 2016 starring alongside Ella Rumpf, her second collaboration with director Julia Ducournau.

== Filmography ==
Film and television roles for Garance Marillier
Year	Title	Role	Notes
2011	Junior	Justine	Short
2012	Mange	Anna	Television film
2012	It's Not a Cowboy Movie (Ce n'est pas un film de cow-boys)	Nadia	Short
2013	Tout est permis	Mélissa	Television film
2016	Raw	Justine	Film; Nominated—César Award for Most Promising Actress
2018	Ad Vitam	Christa Novak	Television series
2018	Fangs Out	N/A	Video clip for the French band Agar Agar
2019	Pompei	Billie	Film
2021	Madame Claude	Sidonie	Film
2021	Titane	Justine	Film
2021	Gone for Good	Sonia / Inès Kasmi	TV series, based on a novel by Harlan Coben
2021	Warning	Magda	Film
2023	Marinette	Marinette Pichon	
2024	Favours	Sonja	Short film
2025	Couture	Christine	
2025	Elsewhere at Night (Ailleurs la nuit)	Noée	
