= Jody Sperling =

American dancer and choreographer

Jody Sperling (born 1970) is an American dancer, choreographer, and writer based in New York City.

== Biography ==
A dancer-choreographer from New York, Jody Sperling is the founder and artistic director of Time Lapse Dance. She has created more than 50 works and has performed and taught in the US, Bahrain, Canada, France, India, Ireland, Italy, Netherlands, Nigeria, Russia, Scotland and north of the Arctic Circle, in addition to an upcoming tour to Egypt for the 2025 Hakawy Festival.

In 2014, Sperling participated in a polar science mission to the Arctic as the first-ever choreographer-in-residence aboard the US Coast Guard Cutter Healy. During the expedition, she danced on the polar ice cap and made the Creative Climate Award-winning dance film Ice Floe. Time Lapse Dance's production Bringing the Arctic Home transports Sperling's experience in the icescape to the stage. Following her Arctic experience, her artistic focus has been on engaging with climate creatively. Currently, Sperling is developing a dance practice called ecokinetics that cultivates the relationship between the moving body and environmental systems while providing strategies for climate-engaged artmaking. She is currently Eco-Artist-in-Residence at The New York Society for Ethical Culture.

She is considered the world’s leading exponent of the style of early modern dancer and performance technologist Loïe Fuller (1862-1928). Sperling has expanded Fuller’s genre into the 21st century, deploying it in the context of contemporary and environmental performance forms. Sperling earned a World Choreography Award nomination for her work as the choreographer, creative consultant, and dance coach on the French feature film La Danseuse (The Dancer) (Dir. Stephanie Di Giusto, 2016 Cannes Film Festival). She is also featured and created a new work for the Fuller documentary Obsessed with Light (Dirs. Sabine Krayenbuehl and Zeva Oelbaum, premiere 2023 Rome Film Fest, US theatrical release December 2024 Quad Cinema NYC).

Sperling and has been in residence at dozens of colleges and universities including The Ailey School/Fordham, Barnard College, Brenau University, Bloomfield College, DeSales College, Hobart & William Smith, Hofstra University, Hunter College, Montclair State University, Rutgers University, Skidmore College, Southern Methodist University, Vassar College, Wesleyan University, UC Irvine, UCLA Art-Sci Center, UMass Amherst, University of Nebraska, and University of Wyoming, among others. Sperling has received commissions from the Vermont Performance Lab with Marlboro College, The University of Wyoming through the NEA American Masterpieces Program, and the Streb Lab for Action Mechanics. Her works have been featured in the repertory of The Netherlands’ Introdans ensemble and performed by Ice Theatre of New York.

For the November 2024 Paul Taylor Dance Company Lincoln Center Season, Sperling was commissioned to set her solo, Clair de Lune, and expand upon material originally created for the French feature film La Danseuse (The Dancer) with the Loïe character performing atop a box containing lights within. The work, Vive La Loïe, for the Taylor company mines Fuller’s synaesthetic concept of “color harmony” in which multi-hued lights are composed like musical notes into luminous “melodies” and “chords.” Sperling collaborated closely with Bessie Award-winning lighting designer David Ferri so that each dance moment unfolds as a synthesis of motion, emotion, fabric, and light. The music, Max Richter’s revisiting of Vivaldi, brings a contemporary electricity to a classic.

Sperling holds an MA in Performance Studies (Tisch School of the Arts, New York University), an MFA in Dance (Montclair State University) and a BA in Dance and Italian (Wesleyan University). As a dancer, Sperling has performed in the works of other choreographers including Sarah Michelson and Yvonne Rainer. Sperling, also a dance writer and scholar, has served on the Board of Directors of the Society of Dance History Scholars (SDHS) and has presented at the Society's conferences. Her dance writings have appeared online and in print in Dance Magazine, The Village Voice, The SDHS Conference Proceedings, The International Encyclopedia of Dance, and she has contributed chapters to the books Birds of Paradise: Costume as Cinematic Spectacle (British Film Institute, 2014) and Milestones in Dance in the USA (Routledge, 2022).
