= Alpha (2025 film) =

Body horror drama film by Julia Ducournau

- French theatrical release poster
- Directed by: Julia Ducournau
- Written by: Julia Ducournau
- Produced by: Jean des Forêts; Amelie Jacqu; Éric Altmayer; Nicolas Altmayer
- Starring: Tahar Rahim; Golshifteh Farahani; Mélissa Boros
- Cinematography: Ruben Impens
- Edited by: Jean-Christophe Bouzy
- Music by: Jim Williams
- Production companies: Mandarin & Compagnie; Kallouche Cinéma; Frakas Productions; France 3 Cinéma; RTBF; Proximus; BeTV; Orange; Petit Film
- Distributed by: Diaphana Distribution (France); O'Brother Distribution (Belgium)
- Release dates: 19 May 2025 (Cannes); 20 August 2025 (France); 3 September 2025 (Belgium)
- Running time: 128 minutes
- Countries: France; Belgium
- Languages: French; Berber
- Box office: $1 million

Alpha is a 2025 body horror drama film written and directed by Julia Ducournau. Starring Tahar Rahim, Golshifteh Farahani, Mélissa Boros, Emma Mackey, Finnegan Oldfield and Louai El Amrousy, it follows a teen girl who, after returning from school with a tattoo, is feared to have contracted a new lethal bloodborne disease.

The film had its world premiere at the main competition of the 2025 Cannes Film Festival on 19 May, where it was nominated for the Palme d'Or. It received mixed reviews from critics, who praised the acting, especially Rahim's performance, but criticized the screenplay. It was theatrically released in France by Diaphana Distribution on 20 August 2025, and in Belgium by O'Brother Distribution on 3 September.

== Plot ==
Alpha, a rebellious 13-year-old, lives with her single Berber mother, a doctor who helps patients afflicted with a blood-borne disease that slowly turns the infected into marble. In the present, Alpha receives a stick and poke tattoo with her friend, Adrien. Alpha's tattoo becomes infected, and her mother becomes concerned that she may have contracted the disease. Alpha's uncle, Amin, moves into their home to become sober from heroin, and the two connect. However, he soon relapses and overdoses, but is resuscitated by Alpha's mother. Alpha's grandmother believes that the "Red Wind" is causing his condition.

At school, Alpha becomes the target of bullying and begins a relationship with Adrien. Two weeks after the tattoo, Alpha's mother takes her to the hospital for blood testing, where she sees her English teacher, whose partner is infected by the disease. Students begin spreading rumors that Alpha has the disease, and Adrien accuses Alpha of spreading the disease to him. Alpha, her mother, and Amin attend a family gathering, where Amin once again overdoses and is resuscitated. As the bullying continues, the school's principal demands a negative test result from Alpha due to mounting pressure from parents.

Alpha's test returns negative, but her mother continues to fixate on the possibility of her being infected. She cuts her finger and exchanges blood with Alpha to ensure that they will share the same fate. Alpha's mother and Amin argue, and a flashback reveals that while taking a sample from Amin, red dust began pouring uncontrollably from the wound. Alpha is forbidden from leaving her room and is locked indoors with Amin, who is experiencing withdrawals. Later that night, Amin helps Alpha sneak out of the house and takes her to a nightclub filled with people suffering from the disease.

Alpha visits Adrien's house, and she discovers that Adrien has the same tattoo. Upset that he accused her of giving him the disease and learning that he tested negative, she leaves. She catches a bus and finds Amin, who asks her to stop her mother from resuscitating him again if he overdoses. They travel to the beach, and Amin leaves her to buy heroin. Alpha finds Amin overdosing and runs to find her mother. A flashback reveals that Amin has already died from the disease years ago, and that his existence in the present is a phantom of Alpha's trauma.

In the present, Alpha's mother awakes in the motel, and they agree not to let him return home with them. A red dust storm envelopes the streets as they drive. The three exit the car, and as Alpha's mother walks Amin to the door, he disintegrates into the red dust.

== Cast ==
- Tahar Rahim as Amin, Alpha's uncle
- Golshifteh Farahani as Alpha's mother, a doctor
- Mélissa Boros as Alpha
  - Ambrine Trigo Ouaked as Alpha, 5 years old
- Emma Mackey as the nurse
- Finnegan Oldfield as the English teacher
- Louai El Amrousy as Adrien
- Marc Riso as Benny
- Jean-Charles Clichet as the sports teacher
- François Rollin as the headmaster
- Driver as the hospital's security officer

== Production ==
The film has been described by distributors FilmNation Entertainment and Charades as writer/director Julia Ducournau's "most personal, profound work". The fictitious disease featured in the film has been analyzed by most critics as an allegory for HIV/AIDS, with the plot reflecting the beginning of the HIV/AIDS epidemic in the 1980s and its aftermath in the 90s.

=== Filming ===
Principal photography took place in Le Havre in September and October 2024. From 23–24 October onward, a public swimming pool in Pont-Audemer was used as a filming location, chosen for its 1980s appearance. 35 days were spent filming in Normandy, followed by continued filming in Paris into November. Rahim lost 20 kilograms for his role.

== Release ==
In May 2024, Neon acquired North American distribution rights to Alpha at the Marché du Film, having distributed Ducournau's previous film Titane (2021). The film competed for the Palme d'Or at the 2025 Cannes Film Festival, where it had its world premiere on 19 May. It was also showcased at the 53rd Norwegian International Film Festival in Main Programme section on 16 August. The film opened the 58th Sitges Film Festival on 9 October. It competed for a Bronze Horse Best Film award at the 2025 Stockholm International Film Festival on 13 November.

It was theatrically released in France by Diaphana Distribution on 20 August 2025, and in Belgium by O'Brother Distribution on 3 September. It was released in the United States and Canada by Neon on 27 March 2026. It will be distributed by Mubi in Latin America and India, and Curzon Film in the United Kingdom and Ireland.

== Reception ==
On the review aggregator website Rotten Tomatoes, 58% of 106 critics' reviews are positive, with an average rating of 6.0/10. The website's consensus reads: "Strong performances and a visually striking finale notwithstanding, Alpha ultimately frustrates with its unwieldy structure and imbalanced blend of fantastical and realistic elements." Metacritic, which uses a weighted average, assigned the film a score of 56 out of 100, based on 25 critics, indicating "mixed or average" reviews.

David Ehrlich of Indiewire called the film "dismal" and Ducournau's "first unambiguous misfire," and Peter Bradshaw of The Guardian wrote in a one-star review that "the madly, bafflingly overwrought and humourless storytelling can’t overcome the fact that everything [in the film] is frankly unpersuasive and tedious." However, in a more positive review, Radhika Seth of Vogue stated that the film "feels destined to become a cult classic," and praised the performances of Boros, Farahani, and Rahim.

=== Accolades ===
Award	Date of ceremony	Category	Recipient(s)	Result	Ref.
Cannes Film Festival	24 May 2025	Palme d'Or	Julia Ducournau	Nominated	
Cannes Film Festival	24 May 2025	Queer Palm	Julia Ducournau	Nominated	
