= Nadia Tereszkiewicz =

French actress (born 1996)

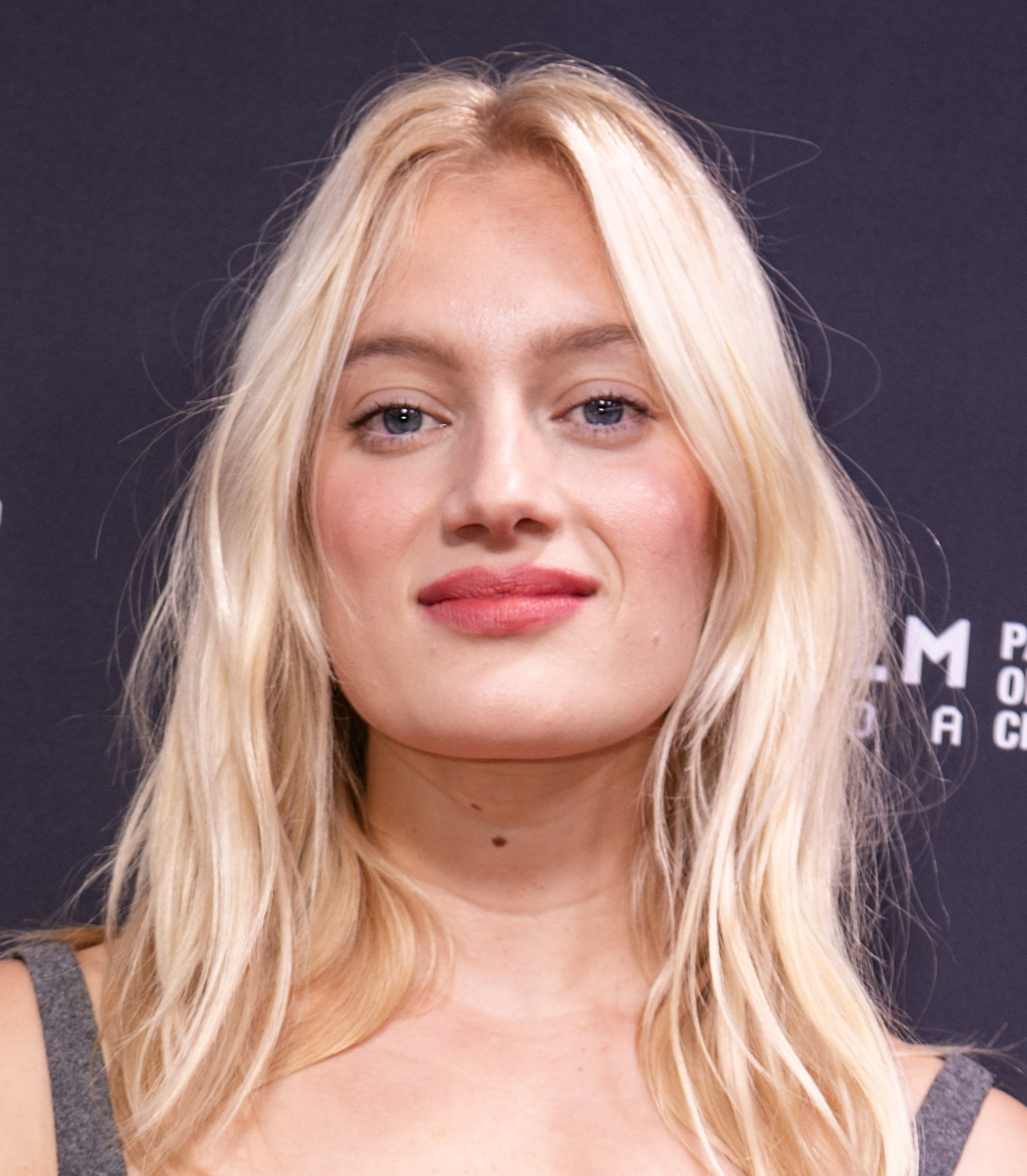
- Tereszkiewicz in 2025
- Born: 24 May 1996 (age 30); Versailles, France
- Years active: 2015–present

Nadia Tereszkiewicz (French: [nadja tɛʁɛskevitʃ]; born 24 May 1996) is a French actress.

== Early life ==
Tereszkiewicz was born in Versailles, France, to a Finnish mother and a Polish father, who named her after a character from the 1994 Nikita Mikhalkov film Burnt by the Sun. Tereszkiewicz dreamed of becoming a dancer as a child and studied dance at summer courses in Mikkeli and Savonlinna while visiting Finland. She practised dance from age 4 to 18, attending the École supérieure de danse de Cannes Rosella Hightower and then Canada's National Ballet School. She then took hypokhâgne-khâgne with an option in theatre at the Lycée Molière in Paris, and a classe libre at the Cours Florent, in Paris. Her mother tongues are French and Finnish, and she also speaks English and Italian.

== Career ==
Tereszkiewicz danced in films and videos while studying. She made her feature film debut in The Dancer (2016), which inspired her to pursue an acting career.

In 2019, Tereszkiewicz appeared in Dominik Moll's Only the Animals, which earned her a Best Actress award at the Tokyo International Film Festival and inclusion in the list of revelations by the 2020 Césars. In 2020, she appeared in the French-Israeli miniseries Possessions in a leading role alongside Reda Kateb. In 2022, she starred in Forever Young, which premiered in competition at the Cannes Film Festival, directed by Valeria Bruni Tedeschi, who shared scenes with Tereszkiewicz in Only the Animals. In 2023, she was awarded the César Award for Most Promising Actress for her performance in Forever Young.

She received a Canadian Screen Award nomination for Best Supporting Performance in a Film at the 11th Canadian Screen Awards in 2023, for her performance as Amy in the film Babysitter.

In 2025, Tereszkiewicz was appointed to the jury of the Progressive Cinema Competition at the 20th Rome Film Festival.

== Filmography ==
Year	Title	Role	Director
2016	The Dancer	Dancer	Stéphanie Di Giusto
2018	Father and Sons	Nightclub girl	Félix Moati
2018	Wild	Nora	Dennis Berry
2019	Persona Non Grata	Anaïs Laffont	Roschdy Zem
2019	Only the Animals	Marion	Dominik Moll
2020	A Night in the Fields	Océane	Guillaume Grélardon
2020	A Museum Sleeps	Chloé	Camille de Chenay
2022	Babysitter	Amy	Monia Chokri
2022	Tom	Joss	Fabienne Berthaud
2022	Forever Young	Stella	Valeria Bruni Tedeschi
2022	The Last Queen	Astrid	Damien Ounouri, Adila Bendimerad
2023	The Crime Is Mine	Madeleine Verdier	François Ozon
2023	Rosalie	Rosalie Deluc	Stéphanie Di Giusto
2023	Red Island	Colette Lopez	Robin Campillo
2025	Heads or Tails?	Rosa	Alessio Rigo de Righi, Matteo Zoppis
2025	Two Pianos	Claude	Arnaud Desplechin
