= Agathe Dronne =

French actress

- Born: Agathe Camille Jane Dronne; 1970 (age 55–56)
- Years active: 1993—present

Agathe Dronne is a French actress and film director.

== Career ==
Her credits include roles in more than 20 films and 10 TV projects, as well as multiple theatre performances.

She presented her short La Vallée des larmes at 2013 Conti Film Festival where the film won the Audience Award.

== Selected filmography ==
=== Actress ===
- 2007 — The Vanishing Point, dir. Laurent de Bartillat;
- 2013 — My Soul Healed by You, dir. Francois Dupeyron;
- 2015 — Les Cowboys, dir. Thomas Bidegain;
- 2017 — Endangered Species, dir. Gilles Bourdos.
- 2018 — Marche ou crève;
- 2021 — Full Time, dir. Eric Gravel.

=== Director ===
- 2012 — La Vallée des larmes short.

== Sources ==
- "Annarita Zambrano" (PDF). Visioni Italiane (in Italian). Fondazione Cineteca di Bologna. 2013. Archived (PDF) from the original on 2024-05-08.
