= Toronto International Film Festival People's Choice Award: Midnight Madness =

Annual Canadian film award

The Toronto International Film Festival People's Choice Award for Midnight Madness is an annual film award, presented by the Toronto International Film Festival to the film rated as the year's most popular film in the festival's "Midnight Madness" stream of underground and cult films. The award was first introduced in 2009.

After the award is announced, the festival offers a repeat screening of the winner at the TIFF Lightbox on the final day of the festival.

== Process ==
The voting process is the same as for the feature film People's Choice: at each film screening, attendees are invited to vote for the film online, with voters' e-mail addresses cross-referenced against the ticket registrations to ensure that the vote cannot be manipulated by people who have not seen the film.

== Winners and runners-up ==
Year	Film	Director(s)	Ref
2009	The Loved Ones	Sean Byrne	
2009	Daybreakers	Michael Spierig and Peter Spierig	
2010	Stake Land	Jim Mickle	
2010	Fubar 2	Michael Dowse	
2011	The Raid	Gareth Evans	
2011	You're Next	Adam Wingard	
2011	God Bless America	Bobcat Goldthwait	
2012	Seven Psychopaths	Martin McDonagh	
2012	The Bay	Barry Levinson	
2012	John Dies at the End	Don Coscarelli	
2013	Why Don't You Play in Hell?	Sion Sono	
2013	Oculus	Mike Flanagan	
2013	Witching and Bitching	Álex de la Iglesia	
2014	What We Do in the Shadows	Taika Waititi and Jemaine Clement	
2014	Tusk	Kevin Smith	
2014	Big Game	Jalmari Helander	
2015	Hardcore Henry	Ilya Naishuller	
2015	The Final Girls	Todd Strauss-Schulson	
2015	Green Room	Jeremy Saulnier	
2016	Free Fire	Ben Wheatley	
2016	The Autopsy of Jane Doe	André Øvredal	
2016	Raw	Julia Ducournau	
2017	Bodied	Joseph Kahn	
2017	The Disaster Artist	James Franco	
2017	Brawl in Cell Block 99	S. Craig Zahler	
2018	The Man Who Feels No Pain	Vasan Bala	
2018	Halloween	David Gordon Green	
2018	Assassination Nation	Sam Levinson	
2019	The Platform	Galder Gaztelu-Urrutia	
2019	The Vast of Night	Andrew Patterson	
2019	Blood Quantum	Jeff Barnaby	
2020	Shadow in the Cloud	Roseanne Liang	
2020	No runners-up named due to the reduced lineup in light of the COVID-19 pandemic in Toronto.		
2021	Titane	Julia Ducournau	
2021	You Are Not My Mother	Kate Dolan	
2021	Dashcam	Rob Savage	
2022	Weird: The Al Yankovic Story	Eric Appel	
2022	Pearl	Ti West	
2022	The Blackening	Tim Story	
2023	Dicks: The Musical	Larry Charles	
2023	KILL	Nikhil Nagesh Bhat	
2023	Hell of a Summer	Finn Wolfhard, Billy Bryk	
2024	The Substance	Coralie Fargeat	
2024	Dead Talents Society	John Hsu	
2024	Friendship	Andrew DeYoung	
2025	Nirvanna the Band the Show the Movie	Matt Johnson	
2025	Obsession	Curry Barker	
2025	The Furious	Kenji Tanigaki	
2026	Ladies and Gentlemen, Brian Mulroney	Matthew Rankin	
2026	The Spiral	Paolo Strippoli	
2026	Arrested Memory	Sabu	

== See also ==
- Midnight film
- Underground film
- Cult film
