= Selfie (2019 film) =

2019 French comedy film

- Film poster
- Directed by: Tristan Aurouet; Thomas Bidegain; Marc Fitoussi; Cyril Gelblat; Vianney Lebasque
- Written by: Giulio Callegari; Noé Debré; Hélène Lombard; Julien Sibony; Bertrand Soulier
- Starring: Manu Payet; Blanche Gardin; Elsa Zylberstein; Max Boublil
- Edited by: Stephan Couturier; Claire Fieschi
- Music by: Laurent Perez Del Mar
- Production companies: Mandoline; Chez Georges Productions
- Distributed by: Apollo Films
- Release dates: 18 September 2019 (FIFIGROT); 15 January 2020
- Country: France
- Language: French
- Box office: $1.1 million

Selfie is a 2019 comedy film starring an ensemble cast of actors. The film premiered at the 2019 Festival International du Film Grolandais de Toulouse (FIFIGROT).

== Cast ==
- Blanche Gardin as Stéphanie Perez
- Maxence Tual as Fred Perez
- Elsa Zylberstein as Bettina
- Max Boublil as Toon
- Finnegan Oldfield as Florian Delamare
- Fanny Sidney as Emma
- Manu Payet as Romain
- Julia Piaton as Amandine
- Sébastien Chassagne as Fabrice
- Mariama Gueye as Inès
- Thomas de Pourquery as Christophe
- Sam Karmann as Dr. Gérard Sanerot
- Anne Benoît as Chantal
- Alma Jodorowsky as Jeanne
- Michaël Abiteboul as Daniel Nivet
