= Reinventing Marvin =

2017 film

- Theatrical release poster
- French: Marvin ou la belle éducation
- Directed by: Anne Fontaine
- Written by: Anne Fontaine; Pierre Trividic
- Produced by: Philippe Carcassonne; Jean-Louis Livi; Pierre-Alexandre Schwab
- Starring: Finnegan Oldfield
- Cinematography: Yves Angelo
- Edited by: Annette Dutertre
- Production company: P.A.S. Productions
- Distributed by: Mars Distribution
- Release dates: 3 September 2017 (Venice); 22 November 2017 (France)
- Running time: 115 minutes
- Country: France
- Language: French
- Budget: $8.2 million
- Box office: $812.000

Reinventing Marvin (French: Marvin ou la belle éducation) is a 2017 French drama film directed by Anne Fontaine. It screened in the Horizons section of the 74th Venice International Film Festival on 2 September 2017, and won the Queer Lion.

The film stars Finnegan Oldfield as Marvin, a gay actor in Paris who is struggling to write and perform a one-man theatrical show about his childhood. Isabelle Huppert appears playing herself.

== Cast ==
- Finnegan Oldfield as Marvin Bijoux
- Jules Porier as Young Marvin
- Grégory Gadebois as Dany Bijoux
- Vincent Macaigne as Abel Pinto
- Catherine Salée as Odile Bijoux
- Catherine Mouchet as Madeleine Clément
- Charles Berling as Roland
- Isabelle Huppert as Herself
- India Hair as Vanessa

== See also ==
- Isabelle Huppert on screen and stage
