= Love Letters (2025 film) =

2025 drama film by Alice Douard

- French: Des preuves d'amour
- Directed by: Alice Douard
- Written by: Alice Douard
- Produced by: Marine Arrighi de Casanova; Marie Boitard; Alice Douard
- Starring: Ella Rumpf; Monia Chokri
- Cinematography: Jacques Girault
- Edited by: Pierre Deschamps
- Production companies: Apsara Films; Les Films de June; France 2 Cinéma
- Release dates: 17 May 2025 (Cannes); 19 November 2025 (France)
- Running time: 96 minutes
- Country: France
- Language: French
- Box office: $672,173

Love Letters (French: Des preuves d'amour) is a 2025 French drama film written and directed by Alice Douard in her directorial debut. It stars Ella Rumpf and Monia Chokri as a couple expecting their first daughter.

It had its world premiere at the Critics' Week section of the 2025 Cannes Film Festival on 17 May, where it was also nominated for Caméra d'Or and Queer Palm.

== Premise ==
Set in 2014, Céline reconnects with her estranged mother and old friends as she seeks legal recognition of her parental rights while preparing with her wife, Nadia, for the arrival of their first child.

== Cast ==
- Ella Rumpf as Céline
- Monia Chokri as Nadia
- Noémie Lvovsky as Marguerite Orgen, Céline's estranged mother

== Production ==
In April 2023, the project was received production grant from the CNC. Principal photography took place over six weeks in May and June 2024 in Paris and Bordeaux.

In an interview with Critics' Week, Douard said Love Letters drew on her personal experience of adopting her daughter, whom her wife gave birth to in 2018.

== Release ==
Love Letters had its world premiere at the Critics' Week section of the 2025 Cannes Film Festival on 17 May, where it was nominated for Caméra d'Or and Queer Palm. It was theatrically released in France on 19 November 2025. It garnered 88,601 admissions during its theatrical run.

== Reception ==
=== Critical reception ===
On the review aggregator website Rotten Tomatoes, 100% of 11 critics' reviews are positive. Writing for Variety, Catherine Bray described the film as an "undeniably modest drama". She further praised it as "beautifully realized and broadly relatable".

=== Accolades ===
Film festival or award	Date of ceremony	Category	Recipient(s)	Result	Ref.
Cannes Film Festival	24 June 2025	Caméra d'Or	Alice Douard	Nominated	
Cannes Film Festival	24 June 2025	Queer Palm	Alice Douard	Nominated	
Filmfest Hamburg	4 October 2025	Hamburg Audience Award	Alice Douard	Won	
Zurich Film Festival	4 October 2025	Golden Eye for Best Feature Film	Alice Douard	Special Mention	
Gijón International Film Festival	22 November 2025	Europa Film Festivals – Young Europe Award	Alice Douard	Won	
