= Titane =

2021 film by Julia Ducournau

- Theatrical release poster
- Directed by: Julia Ducournau
- Written by: Julia Ducournau
- Produced by: Jean-Christophe Reymond
- Starring: Vincent Lindon; Agathe Rousselle; Garance Marillier; Laïs Salameh
- Cinematography: Ruben Impens
- Edited by: Jean-Christophe Bouzy
- Music by: Jim Williams
- Production companies: Kazak Productions; Frakas Productions; Arte France Cinéma; VOO; BeTV
- Distributed by: Diaphana Distribution (France); O'Brother Distribution (Belgium)
- Release dates: 13 July 2021 (Cannes); 14 July 2021 (France); 28 July 2021 (Belgium)
- Running time: 108 minutes
- Countries: France; Belgium
- Language: French
- Box office: $6.5 million

Titane (French: [titan], lit. 'Titanium') is a 2021 body horror psychological drama film written and directed by Julia Ducournau. The French-Belgian co-production stars Agathe Rousselle in her feature film debut as Alexia, a woman who, after being injured in a car crash as a child, has a titanium plate fitted into her head. In adulthood, Alexia becomes a murderous car model with an erotic fascination with automobiles, leading to a bizarre sexual encounter that sets off an increasingly outlandish series of events. Vincent Lindon, Garance Marillier and Laïs Salameh also star.

The film had its world premiere at the Cannes Film Festival on 13 July 2021, where Ducournau became the second female director to win the Palme d'Or, the festival's top award, as well as the first female filmmaker to win solo. It received critical acclaim and was selected as the French entry for the Best International Feature Film at the 94th Academy Awards, but did not make the shortlist. At the 47th César Awards, it was nominated for four awards, including Best Director for Ducournau and Most Promising Actress for Rousselle. At the 75th British Academy Film Awards, Ducournau received a nomination for Best Director. At the 11th Magritte Awards, Titane received five nominations and won two awards, including Best Foreign Film.

== Plot ==
A little girl named Alexia annoys her father during a drive. As she removes her seatbelt, her father turns around to scold her, causing a car crash. Alexia suffers a skull injury and has a titanium plate fitted into her head. When she gets out of the hospital, she shuns her parents and embraces their car passionately.

Years later, Alexia, now an adult with a large scar on the side of her head, works as a showgirl at a motor show. One night, after a show, a male fan follows Alexia in the showroom's parking lot, declares his love to her, and forcibly kisses her; she then brutally kills him using her large metal hair stick. As she returns to the showroom to shower, Alexia finds that the tuned Cadillac she modeled with earlier has turned on by itself. She enters it naked, has sex with the Cadillac, and climaxes.

It is revealed that Alexia is a serial killer who has murdered three other men and a woman in the past few months. She still lives with her parents, who seem unaware of her connection with the crimes and with whom she has a distant relationship.

Alexia attends a house party, where she starts to have sex with her coworker Justine. However, motor oil begins secreting from her vagina. She takes a pregnancy test, which returns a positive result, and tries to perform an abortion on the spot, using her hair stick, but fails. She comes out of the bathroom and murders Justine and two other men, but one woman manages to escape. Alexia returns home and tries to burn a bloodied blanket, which sets the house on fire. She locks her parents in their bedroom and leaves.

Now wanted for murder, Alexia alters her appearance to pretend to be Adrien Legrand, a young boy who had disappeared ten years before, at age seven, by cutting her hair, taping down her breasts and pregnant belly, and breaking her own nose. She then goes to the police claiming that she is Adrien, where his father, Vincent Legrand, a fire captain, accepts Alexia as his missing son and refuses to conduct a DNA test.

Vincent takes Alexia to the station where he lives and works, and introduces her to his men. The firefighters are puzzled by the mute, androgynous, and apparently traumatized "Adrien", but they refrain from questioning the captain's behavior. Alexia becomes an apprentice at the station, under Vincent's supervision. As Vincent gives more responsibility to his "son" over the other experienced firefighters, one firefighter confronts Vincent about "Adrien's" identity. However, Vincent immediately shuts him down and tells him to never speak of his son again.

Vincent tries to preserve his strength by injecting steroids into his aging body, but he finds that he seems to be building an immunity to them. Alexia is increasingly disturbed by his possessiveness and considers escaping from the fire station. However, after Vincent experiences an arrhythmia after injecting a large dose of steroids, Alexia decides to stay with him.

Vincent's long-estranged ex-wife comes to see her "son", and ends up discovering a now-heavily pregnant Alexia without her body taped down. She nevertheless keeps the secret to herself, not wishing to interfere with her ex-husband's delusion, and begs Alexia to take care of him. Vincent eventually acknowledges his delusion, telling Alexia that "whoever you are, you are my son." When he inadvertently uncovers her breasts, he is shocked but continues caring for her.

At a party at the fire station, the firefighters urge "Adrien" to dance to the music. Alexia performs her showgirl choreography, confusing everyone. Vincent, disappointed, walks out of the crowd. After the party, Alexia has sex with a fire engine.

Alexia's body gradually breaks down, as the skin of her stomach tears to reveal new metal plates. When her pregnancy comes to term, Alexia reveals her real name to Vincent, briefly attempting to seduce him and before begging him for help as she goes into active labor. Vincent helps Alexia give birth, the titanium side of her skull splitting open on her final push, killing her. The newborn's body appears with patches of titanium on its body. Vincent says repeatedly to the baby, "I'm here."

== Cast ==
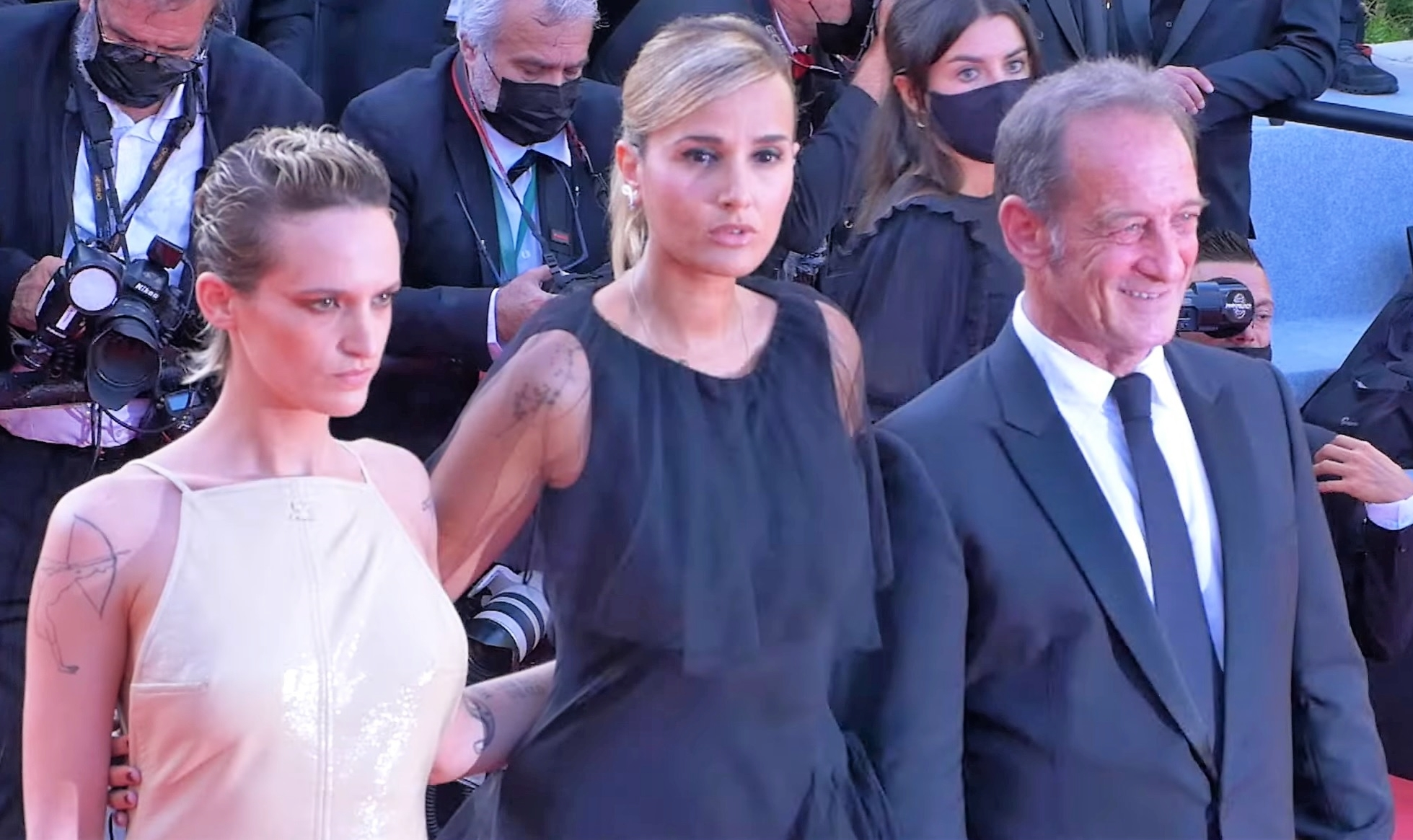
Left to right: actress Agathe Rousselle, director Julia Ducournau, actor Vincent Lindon at the 2021 Cannes Film Festival closing ceremony

- Agathe Rousselle as Alexia/Adrien
- Vincent Lindon as Vincent Legrand
- Garance Marillier as Justine
- Laïs Salameh as Rayane
- Myriem Akheddiou as Adrien's mother
- Bertrand Bonello as Alexia's father
- Dominique Frot as Old woman
- Adèle Guigue as young Alexia
- Céline Carrère as Alexia's mother
- Thibault Cathalifaud as Alexia's fan

== Production ==
In September 2019, it was announced that Vincent Lindon and Agathe Rousselle had joined the cast of the film, with Julia Ducournau directing the film from a screenplay she wrote. Neon distributed the film in the United States.

Production was initially set to begin in April 2020, but was delayed due to the COVID-19 pandemic. Principal photography eventually began in September 2020.

== Release ==
Titane had its world premiere at the Cannes Film Festival on 13 July 2021, where it received the Palme d'Or, the festival's top award. The film also screened at New York, London and Toronto.

Altitude Film Distribution and Film4 jointly acquired distribution rights for the film in the UK and Ireland in June 2021, prior to the film's Cannes premiere. It was released in France by Diaphana Distribution on 14 July 2021, in Belgium by O'Brother Distribution on 28 July 2021, and in the United States by Neon on 1 October 2021.

== Reception ==
=== Critical response ===
On review aggregator website Rotten Tomatoes, the film holds an approval rating of 90% based on 256 reviews, with an average rating of 7.8/10. The site's critics consensus reads: "Thrillingly provocative and original, Titane reaffirms writer-director Julia Ducournau's delightfully disturbing vision." On Metacritic, the film holds a rating of 75 out of 100, based on 46 critics, indicating "generally favorable reviews".

Nicholas Barber from BBC gave the film four out of five stars and called it "the most shocking film of 2021." In his review for Variety, Peter Debruge called the film, "a cross between David Cronenberg's Crash and the uterine horrors of Takashi Miike's Gozu," and praised Ducournau for her handling of the film's themes. In The Observer, Mark Kermode also compared the film to Crash whilst praising its cinematography and emotional depth, and listed it as one of the best films of 2021. Clarisse Loughrey in The Independent praised Rousselle and Lindon's performances and Ducournau's direction. In NME, Lou Thomas gave the film five out of five stars and called it a "masterpiece". In a more negative review, Peter Bradshaw, writing for The Guardian, gave the film two out of five stars and compared it unfavorably to Ducournau's previous film, stating; "...everything is so laboured and crudely directed, without the style and sympathy of Raw." Jude Dry in IndieWire was also critical of the film, calling it a "deeply misogynist movie with a healthy side of transphobia".

The film ranks on Rotten Tomatoes' Best Horror Movies of 2021. In June 2025, IndieWire ranked the film at number 79 on its list of "The 100 Best Movies of the 2020s (So Far)." In July 2025, it was one of the films voted for the "Readers' Choice" edition of The New York Times' list of "The 100 Best Movies of the 21st Century," finishing at number 228.

=== Accolades ===
Titane had its world premiere at the Cannes Film Festival on 13 July 2021. During the beginning of the closing ceremony, jury president Spike Lee was told in French to reveal the "first prize", but misinterpreted the phrase to mean "first place". As a result, he prematurely revealed that the film had won the Palme d'Or. Ducournau is the second female director to win the award after Jane Campion in 1993 for The Piano, the first to win the award solo (Campion had won jointly alongside Chen Kaige, who won for Farewell My Concubine), and the fourth woman overall to win after Adèle Exarchopoulos and Léa Seydoux won in 2013 for their performances in Blue Is the Warmest Colour.

At the 2021 Toronto International Film Festival, the film won the People's Choice Award for Midnight Madness. On 12 October 2021, it was selected as the French entry for the Best International Feature Film at the 94th Academy Awards, but did not make the shortlist. At the 47th César Awards, it was nominated for four awards, including Best Director for Ducournau and Most Promising Actress for Rousselle. At the 75th British Academy Film Awards, Ducournau received a nomination for Best Director. At the 11th Magritte Awards, Titane received five nominations and won two awards, including Best Foreign Film.

Award	Date of ceremony	Category	Recipient(s)	Result	Ref.
Cannes Film Festival	17 July 2021	Palme d'Or	Julia Ducournau	Won	
Cannes Film Festival	17 July 2021	Queer Palm	Julia Ducournau	Nominated	
Toronto International Film Festival	18 September 2021	People's Choice Award for Midnight Madness	Julia Ducournau	Won	
Gotham Independent Film Awards	29 November 2021	Best International Feature	Titane	Nominated	
National Board of Review	3 December 2021	Top Five Foreign Language Films	Titane	Won	
Washington D.C. Area Film Critics Association Awards	6 December 2021	Best Foreign Language Film	Titane	Nominated	
Detroit Film Critics Society	6 December 2021	Best Breakthrough Performance	Agathe Rousselle	Nominated	
European Film Awards	11 December 2021	Best Film	Titane	Nominated	
European Film Awards	11 December 2021	Best Director	Julia Ducournau	Nominated	
European Film Awards	11 December 2021	Best Actress	Agathe Rousselle	Nominated	
European Film Awards	11 December 2021	Best Actor	Vincent Lindon	Nominated	
European Film Awards	11 December 2021	Best Makeup and Hairstyling	Flore Masson, Olivier Afonso and Antoine Mancini	Won	
Chicago Film Critics Association Awards	15 December 2021	Best Actress	Agathe Rouselle	Nominated	
Chicago Film Critics Association Awards	15 December 2021	Best Foreign Language Film	Titane	Nominated	
Chicago Film Critics Association Awards	15 December 2021	Best Use of Visual Effects	Titane	Nominated	
Los Angeles Film Critics Association Awards	18 December 2021	Best Supporting Actor	Vincent Lindon	Won	
St. Louis Gateway Film Critics Association Awards	19 December 2021	Best Horror Film	Titane	Nominated	
St. Louis Gateway Film Critics Association Awards	19 December 2021	Best Foreign Language Film	Titane	Nominated	
Florida Film Critics Circle Awards	22 December 2021	Best Supporting Actor	Vincent Lindon	Runner-up	
Florida Film Critics Circle Awards	22 December 2021	Best Foreign Language Film	Titane	Runner-up	
Alliance of Women Film Journalists Awards	January 2022	Best Non-English-Language Film	Titane	Nominated	
Alliance of Women Film Journalists Awards	January 2022	Best Woman Director	Julia Ducournau	Nominated	
Alliance of Women Film Journalists Awards	January 2022	Most Daring Performance Award	Agatha Rouselle	Won	
National Society of Film Critics	8 January 2022	Best Supporting Actor	Vincent Lindon	Runner-up	
Austin Film Critics Association	11 January 2022	Best Actress	Agathe Rousselle	Won	
Austin Film Critics Association	11 January 2022	The Robert R. "Bobby" McCurdy Memorial Breakthrough Artist Award	Agathe Rousselle	Nominated	
Austin Film Critics Association	11 January 2022	Best Supporting Actor	Vincent Lindon	Nominated	
Austin Film Critics Association	11 January 2022	Best International Film	Titane	Nominated	
Seattle Film Critics Society	17 January 2022	Best Picture	Titane	Nominated	
Seattle Film Critics Society	17 January 2022	Best Director	Julia Ducournau	Nominated	
Seattle Film Critics Society	17 January 2022	Best Actress in a Leading Role	Agathe Rousselle	Nominated	
Seattle Film Critics Society	17 January 2022	Best Actor in a Supporting Role	Vincent Lindon	Nominated	
Seattle Film Critics Society	17 January 2022	Best Film Editing	Jean-Christophe Bouzy	Nominated	
Seattle Film Critics Society	17 January 2022	Best Film Not in the English Language	Titane	Nominated	
Online Film Critics Society Awards	24 January 2022	Best Picture	Titane	Nominated	
Online Film Critics Society Awards	24 January 2022	Best Actress	Agathe Rousselle	Nominated	
Online Film Critics Society Awards	24 January 2022	Best Film Not in the English Language	Titane	Nominated	
London Film Critics Circle Awards	6 February 2022	Film of the Year	Titane	Nominated	
London Film Critics Circle Awards	6 February 2022	Foreign Language Film of the Year	Titane	Nominated	
Magritte Awards	12 February 2022	Best Foreign Film	Titane	Won	
Magritte Awards	12 February 2022	Best Supporting Actress	Myriem Akheddiou	Nominated	
Magritte Awards	12 February 2022	Best Cinematography	Ruben Impens	Won	
Magritte Awards	12 February 2022	Best Production Design	Laurie Colson and Lise Péault	Nominated	
Magritte Awards	12 February 2022	Best Sound	Séverin Favriau, Fabrice Osinski, Stéphane Thiébaut	Nominated	
César Awards	25 February 2022	Best Director	Julia Ducournau	Nominated	
César Awards	25 February 2022	Most Promising Actress	Agathe Rousselle	Nominated	
César Awards	25 February 2022	Best Cinematography	Ruben Impens	Nominated	
César Awards	25 February 2022	Best Visual Effects	Martial Vallanchon	Nominated	
Gaudí Awards	6 March 2022	Best European Film	Titane	Nominated	
British Academy Film Awards	13 March 2022	Best Director	Julia Ducournau	Nominated	
Golden Reel Awards	13 March 2022	Outstanding Achievement in Sound Editing – Foreign Language Feature Film	Séverin Favriau, Céline Bernard	Nominated	
Critics' Choice Super Awards	17 March 2022	Best Horror Movie	Titane	Nominated	
Critics' Choice Super Awards	17 March 2022	Best Actor in a Horror Movie	Vincent Lindon	Nominated	
Critics' Choice Super Awards	17 March 2022	Best Actress in a Horror Movie	Agathe Rousselle	Won	
American Society of Cinematographers Awards	20 March 2022	Spotlight Award	Ruben Impens	Nominated	
Satellite Awards	2 April 2022	Best Foreign Language Film	Titane	Nominated	

== See also ==
- List of submissions to the 94th Academy Awards for Best International Feature Film
- List of French submissions for the Academy Award for Best International Feature Film
