= Endangered Species (2017 film) =

2017 film

- Directed by: Gilles Bourdos
- Screenplay by: Michel Spinosa; Gilles Bourdos
- Starring: Alice Isaaz; Vincent Rottiers
- Cinematography: Ping Bin Lee
- Edited by: Yannick Kergoat
- Music by: Alexandre Desplat
- Release date: 2017
- Language: French

Endangered Species (French: Espèces menacées) is a 2017 drama film co-written and directed by Gilles Bourdos.

A co-production between France and Belgium, the film is based on some short stories from Richard Bausch. It was entered into the Horizons competition at the 74th edition of the Venice Film Festival.

== Cast ==
- Alice Isaaz as Josephine Kaufman
- Vincent Rottiers as Tomasz
- Grégory Gadebois as Joseph Kaufman
- Suzanne Clément as Edith Kaufman
- Eric Almosino as Vincent Lamblin
- Alice de Lencquesaing as Melanie Lamblin
- Carlo Brandt as Yann Petersen
- Agathe Dronne as Marie Lamblin
- Damien Chapelle as Anthony Gardet
- Brigitte Catillon as Nicole Gardet
- Pauline Étienne as Anna
