= Rosalie (2023 film) =

2023 historical drama film

- Directed by: Stéphanie Di Giusto
- Screenplay by: Stéphanie Di Giusto; Sandrine Le Coustumer
- Based on: A treatment by: Sandrine Le Coustumer; Alexandra Echkenazi
- Produced by: Alain Attal
- Starring: Nadia Tereszkiewicz; Benoît Magimel
- Cinematography: Christos Voudouris
- Edited by: Nassim Gordji-Tehrani
- Music by: Hania Rani
- Production companies: Trésor Films; France 3 Cinéma; Laurent Dassault Rond Point; Artémis Productions; Gaumont
- Distributed by: Gaumont
- Release dates: 18 May 2023 (Cannes); 10 April 2024 (France); 17 April 2024 (Belgium)
- Running time: 115 minutes
- Countries: France; Belgium
- Language: French
- Box office: $811,377

Rosalie is a 2023 historical drama film directed by Stéphanie Di Giusto from a screenplay by Di Giusto and Sandrine Le Coustumer, based on a treatment by Le Coustumer and Alexandra Echkenazi. The film stars Nadia Tereszkiewicz and Benoît Magimel. It is loosely inspired by the life of Clémentine Delait, a famous French bearded lady from the beginning of the 20th century.

It had its world premiere in the Un Certain Regard section at the 76th Cannes Film Festival on 18 May 2023, where it competed for the Queer Palm. It was theatrically released in France on 10 April 2024.

== Synopsis ==
In 1870s Brittany, Rosalie is a young woman who hides a secret: she is a bearded lady. She shaves her face to avoid her fear of being rejected. Abel, owner of a café and in debt, marries Rosalie for her dowry without knowing his bride's secret.

== Cast ==
- Nadia Tereszkiewicz as Rosalie Deluc
- Benoît Magimel as Abel Deluc
- Benjamin Biolay as Barcelin
- Guillaume Gouix as Pierre
- Gustave Kervern as Paul
- Anna Biolay as Jeanne
- Juliette Armanet as Clothilde
- Lucas Englander as Camilius
- Serge Bozon as Photographer
- Eugène Marcuse as Jean

== Production ==
=== Development ===
Rosalie was produced by Alain Attal through his production company Trésor Films. In May and June 2022, the production announced searches for extras for the shooting of Stéphanie Di Giusto's next film, tentatively titled La Rosalie, starring with Nadia Tereszkiewicz and Benoît Magimel, scheduled to take place in Brittany between October and November. The film is co-produced by France 3 Cinéma, Laurent Dassault Rond Point, Artémis Productions (Belgium), and Gaumont.

That same month, Trésor Films announced the theatrical and sales rights were acquired by Gaumont.

=== Filming ===
Filming began on 6 October 2022 in the Brittany region of France. It took place in the Forges des Salles, a former steel producing village in central Brittany that straddles the border between Côtes-d'Armor and Morbihan. The village was discovered by the director after it was featured in the programme Des racines et des ailes. Filming also took place in the commune of Duault (Côtes-d'Armor), where the Manor of Rosviliou was staged as an orphanage. Filming also took place in the commune of Concarneau (Finistère) at the Château de Kériolet, which was used for its guard room. The banquet scene was shot there, where around fifty local extras were brought in. Filming concluded at the start of December.

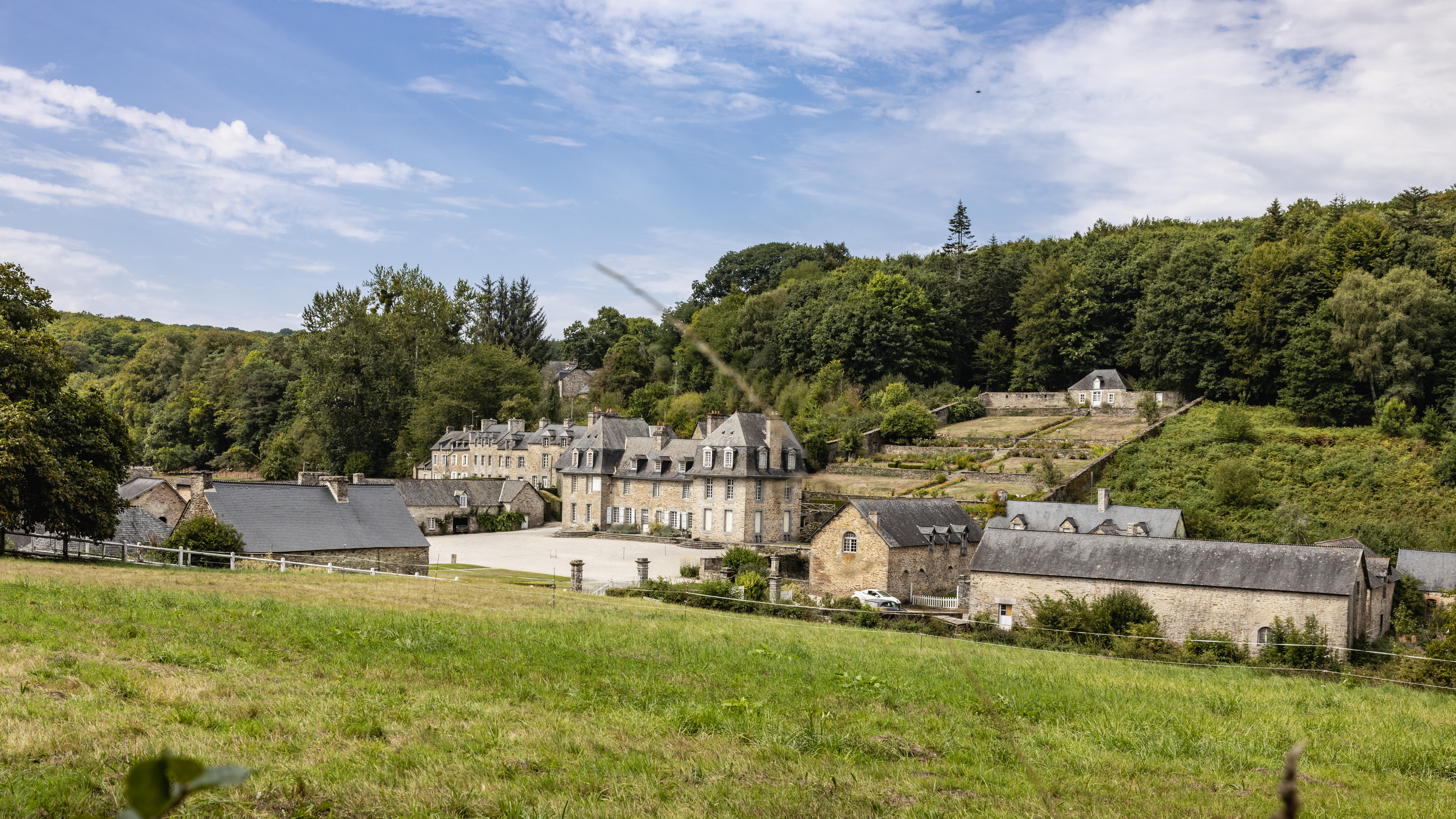
Forges des Salles

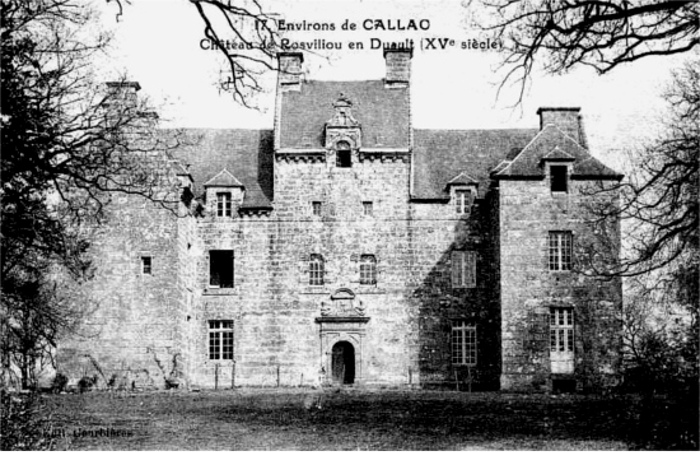
Manor of Rosviliou

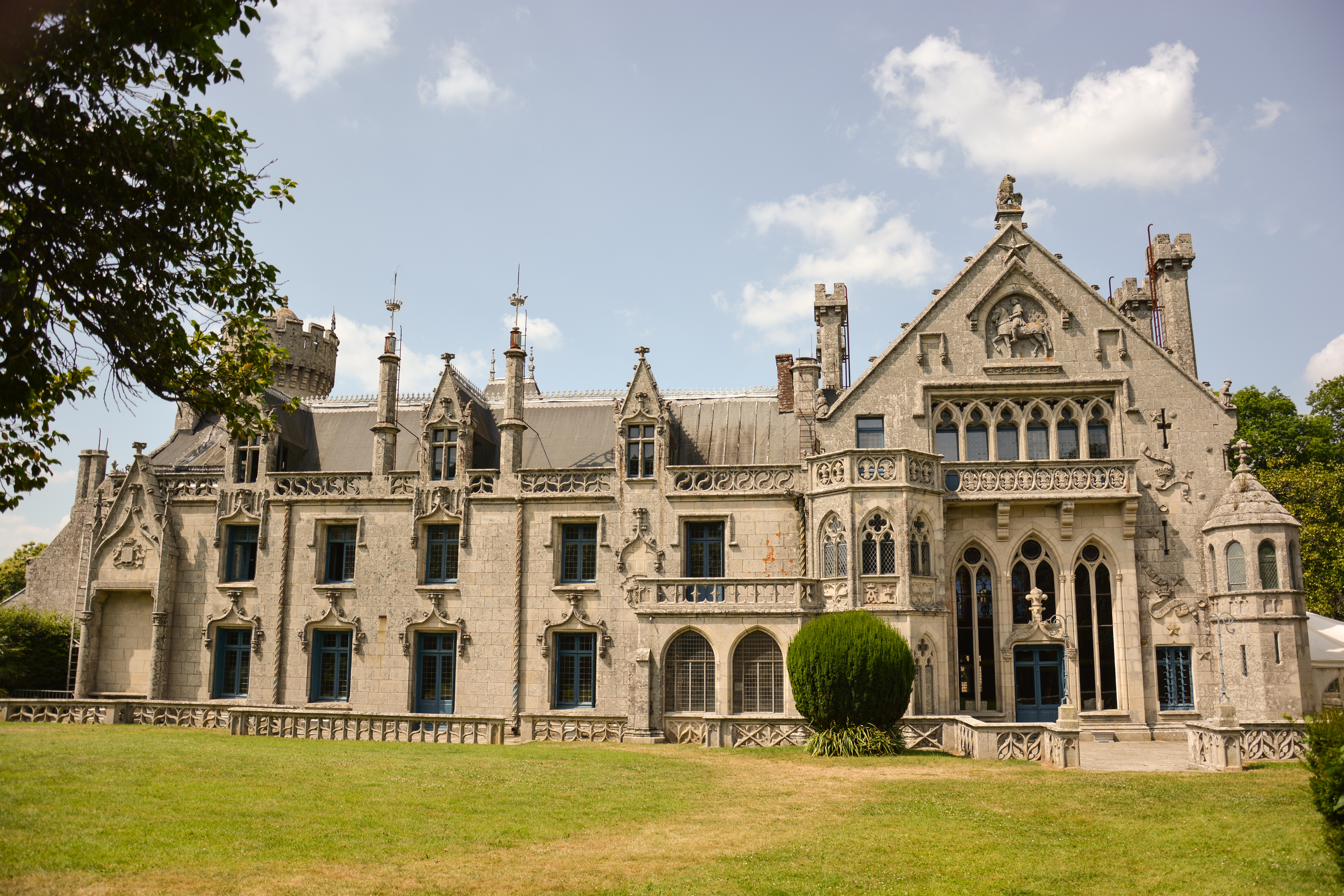
Château de Kériolet

== Release ==
The film was selected to be screened in the Un Certain Regard section of the 76th Cannes Film Festival, where it had its world premiere on 18 May 2023. It was screened at the Théâtre Claude Debussy. At Cannes, it was selected to compete for the Queer Palm award. Juror Isabel Sandoval defined that "queer" "is to resist conformity and exempt oneself from the mainstream". Franck Finance-Madureira, a journalist and creator of the Queer Palm, defined it as "anything that breaks the norm, anything that breaks gender codes and anything that challenges patriarchy".

The film was originally set to be released theatrically in France by Gaumont on 24 January 2024, but the release date was pushed back to 10 April 2024. Athena Films distributed the film in Belgium on 17 April 2024.

== Reception ==
=== Critical response ===
Rosalie received an average rating of 3.2 out of 5 stars on the French website AlloCiné, based on 30 reviews. On the review aggregator website Rotten Tomatoes, 71% of 14 critics' reviews are positive, with an average rating of 5.5/10.

=== Accolades ===
Award	Date of ceremony	Category	Recipient(s)	Result	Ref.
Cannes Film Festival	26 May 2023	Queer Palm	Stéphanie Di Giusto	Nominated	
Cannes Film Festival	26 May 2023	Un Certain Regard	Stéphanie Di Giusto	Nominated	
