= Tiger Girl (film) =

2017 film

- Film poster
- Directed by: Jakob Lass
- Written by: Jakob Lass
- Starring: Ella Rumpf
- Release dates: 10 February 2017 (Berlin); 6 April 2017 (Germany)
- Running time: 90 minutes
- Country: Germany
- Language: German

Tiger Girl is a 2017 German drama film directed by Jakob Lass. It was screened in the Panorama section at the 67th Berlin International Film Festival.

== Cast ==
- Ella Rumpf as Tiger
- Maria-Victoria Dragus as Vanilla
- Enno Trebs as Theo
- Orce Feldschau as Herr Feldschau
- Franz Rogowski as Malte
