= Les Cowboys =

2015 film

- Theatrical release poster
- Directed by: Thomas Bidegain
- Written by: Noé Debré; Thomas Bidegain
- Produced by: Alain Attal
- Starring: François Damiens; Finnegan Oldfield; Agathe Dronne; Ellora Torchia; John C. Reilly
- Cinematography: Arnaud Potier
- Edited by: Géraldine Mangenot
- Music by: Raphaël Haroche
- Production companies: Les Productions du Trésor; Les Films du Fleuve; Lunanime
- Distributed by: Pathé (France)
- Release dates: 18 May 2015 (Cannes); 25 November 2015 (France)
- Running time: 104 minutes
- Countries: France; Belgium
- Languages: French; English
- Budget: €8 million
- Box office: $1.3 million

Les Cowboys (lit. '"The Cowboys"') is a 2015 French-Belgian drama film directed by Thomas Bidegain. It was screened in the Directors' Fortnight section at the 2015 Cannes Film Festival.

== Cast ==
- François Damiens as Alain Balland
- Finnegan Oldfield as Georges Balland (Kid)
- Agathe Dronne as Nicole Balland
- Ellora Torchia as Shazhana
- John C. Reilly as The American
- Antoine Chappey as Charles
- Iliana Zabeth as Kelly Balland
- Mounir Margoum as Ahmed
- Antonia Campbell-Hughes as Emma
- Laure Calamy as Isabelle
- Sam Louwyck as The forger
- Dani Sanchez-Lopez as The European

== Accolades ==
| Award / Film Festival | Category | Recipients and nominees | Result |
|---|---|---|---|
| César Awards | Best Actor | François Damiens | Nominated |
| César Awards | Most Promising Actor | Finnegan Oldfield | Nominated |
| César Awards | Best First Feature Film | | Nominated |
| César Awards | Best Original Music | Raphaël Haroche | Nominated |
| Lumière Awards | Best Cinematography | Arnaud Potier | Nominated |
| Magritte Awards | Best Actor | François Damiens | Nominated |
| Magritte Awards | Best Foreign Film in Coproduction | | Nominated |
