= Vanessa Bruno =

French clothing designer

Vanessa Bruno is a French, Paris-based clothing designer. Before launching her first clothing brand in 1996, Vanessa worked as a model, singer and actress. She had collaborated with designer/filmmaker Stephanie Di Giusto in designing clothes for short films, including the short film "A Visual Poetry", starring Kate Bosworth in a video entitled "LØV", which was modelled around the "S-LØV-enian" lake Bled and local Lipizzaner breeds of horses, as part of Vanessa’s Fall 2011 Nordic-themed campaign.

Vanessa began her fashion label at the age of 24 in Paris, France. The fashion label included layers of knit leotards and thick leggings, and simple pastel clothing. Bruno organized her collection into different themes including ballet outfits for her Autumn/Winter 2010 collection.
