= Jakob Lass =

German film director (born 1981)

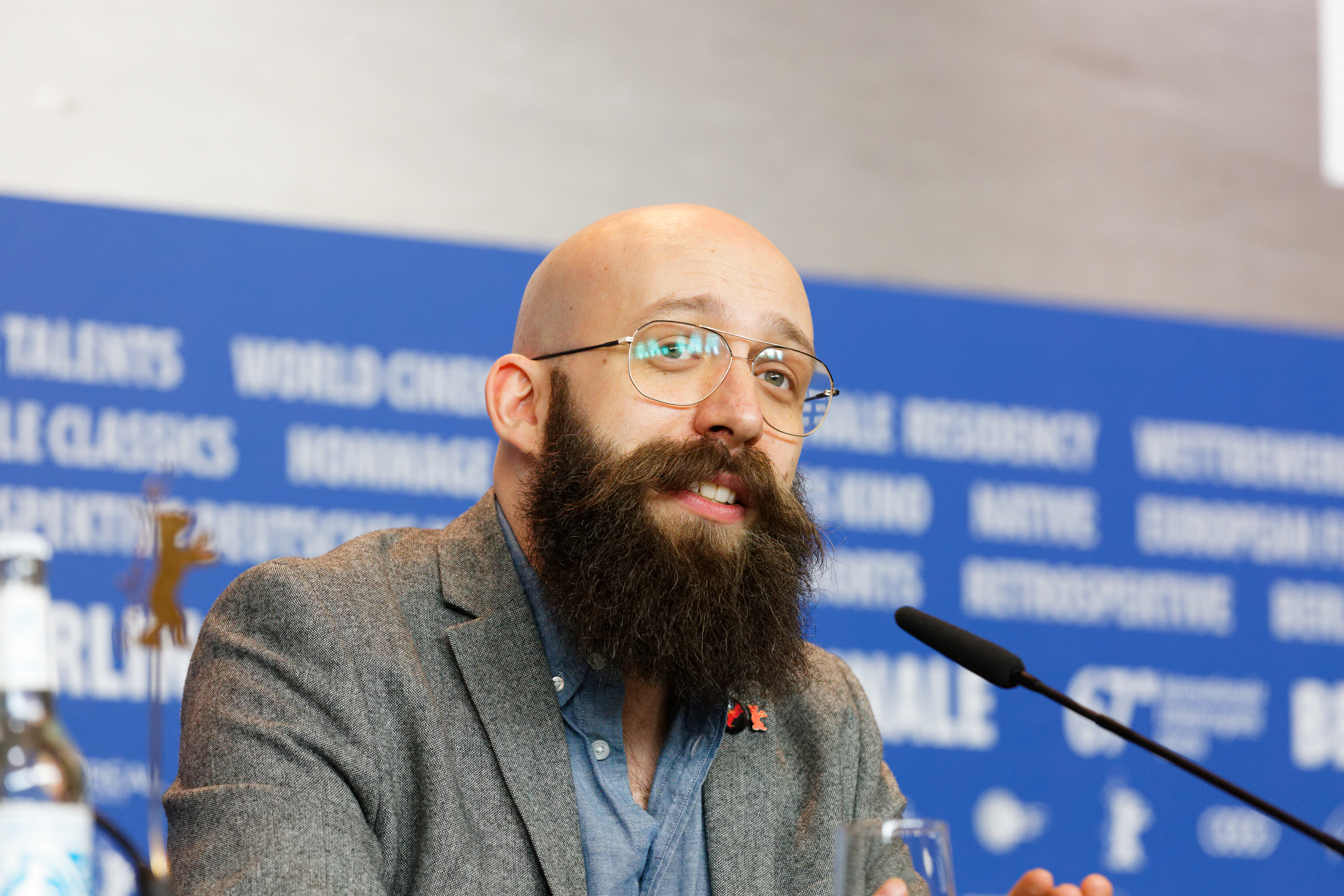
Lass at the Berlinale 2017

Jakob Lass (born 1981) is a German film director, screenwriter, producer, and actor known for his award-winning 2013 comedy drama film Love Steaks, which won New German Cinema Award, Max Ophüls Prize and was nominated for the German Film Award. He is the great-grandson of novelist Leroy Scott. Jakob Lass's debut film was the 2007 short film Bademeister Paul. His most well-received films include the drama films Frontalwatte (2011) and Tiger Girl (2017). His novel adaptation Right Here Right Now has been released in 2018.
