= It's Not a Cowboy Movie =

2012 French comedy film

- French: Ce n'est pas un film de cow-boys
- Directed by: Benjamin Parent
- Written by: Joris Morio; Benjamin Parent
- Produced by: David Frenkel; Arno Moria
- Starring: Malivaï Yakou; Finnegan Oldfield; Leïla Choukri; Garance Marillier; Damien Gomes
- Cinematography: Nicolas Loir
- Edited by: Beatrice Herminie
- Production company: Synecdoche
- Release date: 25 February 2012
- Running time: 11 minutes
- Country: France
- Language: French

It's Not a Cowboy Movie (French: Ce n'est pas un film de cow-boys) is a French short comedy film, directed by Benjamin Parent and released in 2012. The film centres on a group of students who are discussing the film Brokeback Mountain after seeing it on television the night before.

The cast includes Malivaï Yakou as Moussa, Finnegan Oldfield as Vincent, Leïla Choukri as Jessica, Garance Marillier as Nadia, and Damien Gomes as an unnamed boy.

== Distribution ==
It was included in Boys on Film 9: Youth in Trouble, the ninth volume in the Boys on Film series of LGBT-related short film anthology DVDs.

== Awards ==
The film was screened at the 2012 Cannes Film Festival, where it was the winner of the Queer Palm for LGBT-related short films. In 2013, it was a César Award nominee for Best Short Film at the 38th César Awards.

At the 2013 Clermont-Ferrand International Short Film Festival, Oldfield won the award for Best Performance.

== Controversy ==
In 2014, the film became the subject of controversy when anti-gay activists associated with the La Manif pour tous protests attacked it for depicting LGBTQ themes in a youth context. The protests led Parent to give the film free distribution for one week on Vimeo so that people could see for themselves that it featured no age-inappropriate content.
