= Suddenly (2023 film) =

- French: Soudain seuls
- Directed by: Thomas Bidegain
- Screenplay by: Thomas Bidegain; Valentine Monteil; Delphine Gleize
- Based on: Suddenly; 2015 novel by Isabelle Autissier
- Produced by: Alain Attal; Sandrine Paquot
- Starring: Mélanie Thierry; Gilles Lellouche
- Cinematography: Nicolas Loir
- Edited by: Laurence Briaud
- Music by: Raphaël Haroche
- Production companies: Artémis Productions; Trésor Films; Les Films du Camélia [fr]
- Distributed by: Jour2Fête [fr]; Pyramide Films [fr]
- Release date: 2023
- Running time: 85 minutes
- Countries: France; Belgium; Iceland
- Language: French

Suddenly (French: Soudain seuls) is a 2023 French survival thriller film by Thomas Bidegain about a couple with a strained relationship struggling to survive on a deserted island.

== Plot ==
Laura and Ben are out sailing in their own sailboat. Their next populated port of call would have been Port Eden, but they decide to take a long detour to visit a deserted island near the "end of the world" - Antarctica. They check the weather before arriving: it's predicted to be ok for the near future. They anchor the boat and arrive with a small inflatable dinghy. They enjoy the beauty of the place, and climb a rugged hill for a better view. Then they notice that a storm in the distance seems to be coming towards them. They head back to the shore and attempt to launch the dinghy to get back to their boat, but the waves are too high and they are unable to stay in control; so they decide to find shelter and wait out the storm.

When the storm is over, they can no longer see their boat. Laura wonders if it sank, but Ben says boats don't simply sink. So they assume it must have drifted away, somewhere near the island, although Ben is dubious that the anchor could have failed to hold it in place. They climb the nearest hill again; but they do not see it. So they begin to wonder about their options. Since they have seen a sign declaring that this island is a wildlife preserve, they wonder if there should be a research station somewhere on it. Ben sets out to climb higher to see if the boat becomes visible, or there could be a route to another side of the island, but decides the mountains are too steep: at least crampons would be necessary.

They discover the ruins of an old cabin and some sort of commercial operation nearby, which they believe may have been a base for whaling. So they patch it up as well as they can, as temporary shelter. They survive on shellfish and by hunting penguins for a while. One evening they can see a boat in the distance. Laura says they should build a fire to attract attention, but Ben takes off with the dinghy in an attempt to catch up with the boat. It is farther away than it seems, and after a while, the fuel for the small engine runs out.

When Ben finally gets back, he has an open wound on one ankle, which he says got torn open on sharp rocks. Laura attempts to cauterize the wound. Nevertheless, Ben's condition worsens over the next few days. Laura spends some time trying to make crampons from scrap metal that is lying around the area. After a few days of preparation, she begins hiking over the now wintry landscape. Eventually, she finds a research station, apparently built from shipping containers. No one is there, but it is stocked with some food, an HF radio transceiver, and a working generator. She tries the radio briefly, but is unable to hear any signals. She is apparently unaware of typical radio operating procedures, and tries simply transmitting "hello is anyone there" and such messages, apparently on a frequency in the 15 meter amateur band. She is able to cook some food in the kitchen, take a bath, and get some rest. Then she finds a plastic boat with a small engine, stored in another container. She hauls it down to the shore with some difficulty, and sets off to fetch Ben.

She finds Ben in worse condition than he was before, and needs to drag him into the boat. After they get back to the research station, she needs to drag him inside. But in this warm comfortable space, he begins to recover. They conclude that they have everything that they need, and there is no hurry to leave. During the movie, there is a lot of drama, and their relationship passes through various phases. Their trust and reliance on each other is tried, questioned, and then rebuilt.

== Cast ==
- Mélanie Thierry as Laura
- Gilles Lellouche as Ben

== Production ==
In early 2019, Vanessa Kirby and Jake Gyllenhaal were cast as the leads of the project, which was to be Bidegain's English language debut. However, due to friction between Bidegain and Gyllenhaal, the film was scrapped and retooled as a French production.
