= The Divine Order =

2016 film

- Film poster
- Directed by: Petra Volpe
- Written by: Petra Volpe
- Starring: Marie Leuenberger
- Cinematography: Judith Kaufmann
- Release date: 9 March 2017
- Running time: 96 minutes
- Country: Switzerland
- Language: Swiss German

The Divine Order (German: Die göttliche Ordnung) is a 2017 Swiss comedy-drama film written and directed by Petra Volpe. It was selected as the Swiss entry for the Best Foreign Language Film at the 90th Academy Awards, but it was not nominated. The film centres on Nora Ruckstuhl, a housewife and mother in a small village. She publicly advocated for women's suffrage in Switzerland to be voted on in a 1971 referendum.

== Plot ==
In the early 1970s as black power, women's liberation and the sexual revolution are overtaking America, Nora Ruckstuhl is a housewife living in a small Swiss farming village where she lives with her husband, Hans, their two sons, and her father-in-law. When Nora suggests that she might like to go back to work as she is bored of housework her husband suggests that they have another child.

Nora's niece Hanna is despondent after her mother forbids her from seeing her much older boyfriend. She convinces Nora to let her see him one last time, but when they arrive in town Hanna runs off with her boyfriend. While wandering around downtown Nora meets some women demonstrating for women's suffrage. Reluctantly admitting that she is for the women's right to vote she is given flyers and reading material including Betty Friedan's The Feminine Mystique.

Nora continues to press the issue of wanting to work, but her husband shoots it down more forcefully. She also learns that Hanna has been detained in Zurich and her father has allowed her to be committed to a juvenile detention facility. Emboldened by these two events, Nora publicly declares that she is for women's suffrage at a meeting at her women's club. Her statement draws the attention of Vroni, an older woman who claims she was always for women's suffrage. Vroni insists that the two of them hold an event to show their support for women's suffrage. As her husband is away serving in the military for two weeks Nora reluctantly agrees.

While reminiscing about the pub she owned before her husband lost all their money, Vroni encounters Graziella, an Italian woman planning to turn the pub into a pizzeria. Graziella is supportive of their cause and joins in with them. They are also joined by Nora's sister-in-law Theresa, who is upset when Hanna is kicked out of juvenile detention and placed into a women's prison. When Hanna tells her she is ashamed of her, Theresa decides to join Nora hoping that if she gets the right to vote she will also be able to free her daughter.

Theresa, Nora and Vroni go to the city where they end up participating in a protest for women's rights and a clinic about embracing the yoni where Nora realizes she has never had an orgasm. Emboldened by the lessons she has learned Nora returns to her village where she gives a speech promoting women's right to vote. It is a failure as only Nora and Vroni publicly admit to supporting the cause while other men, including Nora's husband Hans, returned from military service, are too ashamed to publicly support the women, despite doing so in private.

Nora feels defeated after the lack of public support, but Graziella suggests that the women of the village go on strike. While the men are left to fend for themselves and their children the women camp out in Graziella's restaurant. Hans is angry that Nora has left him, but begins to fend for himself, cooking and cleaning after his two children and his father. He is visited by a group of men who ask him to tell Nora to stop, but he refuses, telling them they must sort things out with their wives themselves. Instead several of the men barge into the restaurant and drag their wives home by force. As they leave Vroni gets angry and yells at them causing her to have a heart attack and die.

After Vroni's death the rest of the women abandon Graziella's restaurant and return home except for Teresa who decides to divorce her husband and go live with a cousin of hers. Things between Nora and Hans are tense, but nevertheless Nora goes to Vroni's funeral with her family. When the priest says that Vroni was a modest woman who was satisfied with life, Nora publicly corrects him and she and Hans make up.

The referendum to give women the right to vote is held. The women win the right to vote with a small majority voting in favour of the women, even in Nora's village. Teresa manages to free Hanna who forgives her mother but nevertheless goes to live with her boyfriend. Nora's children learn to look after themselves better and Nora and Hans experience their own sexual revolution in the bedroom with Hans finally learning how to please Nora sexually.

== Cast ==
- Marie Leuenberger as Nora Ruckstuhl
- Maximilian Simonischek as Hans Ruckstuhl
- Rachel Braunschweig as Theresa
- Sibylle Brunner as Vroni
- Marta Zoffoli as Graziella
- Bettina Stucky as Magda

== Reception ==
=== Critical response ===
On review aggregator Rotten Tomatoes, the film holds an approval rating of 85% based on 59 reviews, with a weighted average rating of 6.6/10. The website's critical consensus reads, "The likable cast carries The Divine Order, a crowd-pleasing film that delivers a rousing – if surface level – account of the Swiss women's suffrage movement." On Metacritic, the film has a weighted average score of 67 out of 100, based on 16 critics, indicating "generally favorable reviews".

The original Swiss German dialogue was re-recorded in Standard German for German audiences, a decision that was criticized by one German reviewer.

=== Accolades ===
The Divine Order won the Best Global Cinema award at the San Diego International Film Festival in 2017.

== See also ==
- List of submissions to the 90th Academy Awards for Best Foreign Language Film
- List of Swiss submissions for the Academy Award for Best Foreign Language Film
- Women's suffrage in Switzerland
