= Giovanni Lista =

Italian art historian and art critic (1943–2026)

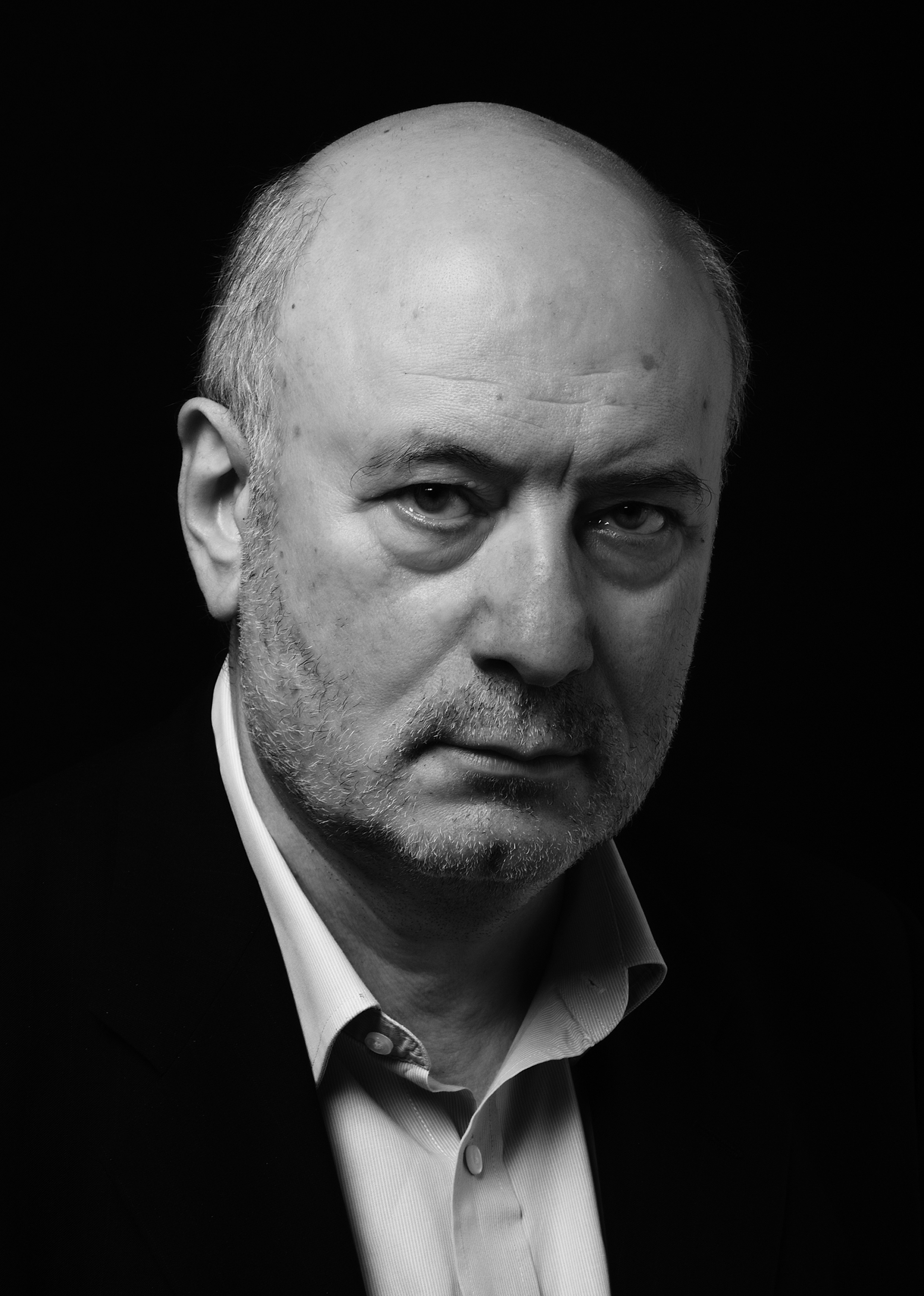
- Giovanni Lista (2009), Photo Paolo Aldi.
- Born: 13 February 1943; Castiglione del Lago, Perugia, Italy
- Died: 3 October 2026 (aged 83); Paris, France
- Occupations: Art historian; art critic
- Known for: Specialist in Futurism
- Awards: Georges Jamati Prize, Chevalier of the Order of Arts and Letters, Chevalier of the Order of Merit of the Italian Republic

Giovanni Lista (13 February 1943 – 3 October 2026) was an Italian art historian and art critic. He was a specialist in the artistic cultural scene of the 1920s, particularly in Futurism.

== Background ==
Lista studied at universities in both Italy and in France until he permanently settled in Paris in February 1970.

While teaching at the university, he became a researcher at the CNRS (National Centre for Scientific Research) in 1974. After being associated with the research laboratories directed by Denis Bablet and Louis Marin, he was appointed Director of Research in 1992.

He founded the review Ligeia, dossiers sur l'art (Ligeia, Art Dossiers) in 1988. Its name is taken from the myth of the Greek siren cited by Plato.

As a member of AICA (International Association of Art Critics) and SGDL (Society of Men of Letters of France), he was awarded the Georges Jamati Prize for the best essay on the theatre, arts and social science published in France in 1989; both the Filmcritica Prize for the best essay on cinema and photography published in Italy and the Giubbe Rosse Prize for the best literary biography essay published in Italy in 2002; and the Venetian Academy Silver Medal in 2010for the lectio magistralis (keynote speech) delivered at the Accademia di Belle Arti in Venice. In April 2011, the French Minister of Culture Frédéric Mitterrand awarded him the title of Chevalier of the Order of Arts and Letters. In June 2011, Italian President Giorgio Napolitano awarded him the title of Chevalier of the Order of Merit of the Italian Republic.

Lista died in Paris on 3 October 2026, at the age of 83.

== Contributions to art criticism ==
Between 1973 and 1988, Lista translated the writings of Filippo Tommaso Marinetti, Luigi Russolo, Umberto Boccioni as well as the syntheses of plays, theoretical texts and manifestos of the Futurists by publishing several collections and anthologies which introduced and divulged the Italian avant-garde in France. At the same time he developed an original approach to the work of Fernand Léger, Robert Delaunay, Marcel Duchamp, Jacques Villon, Francis Picabia, Raymond Duchamp-Villon and Jean Metzinger, dubbed "French Cubo-Futurism".

In 1976 he published the first biography of Marinetti, while beginning to analyse the Futurism founder's political ideas. After studying the political evolution of the Futurist movement, he explored and came to terms with the distinction, formulated by the Florentine Futurists, between "Futurism" and "Marinettism". He contributed in driving the Futurist scholars' attitude towards modernity by focusing on the sense of social and psychological trauma as a result of the industrial transformation. He criticised the different unitarian approaches of Futurist political ideas and in 1980 published the essay "Art and Politics: Left-Wing Futurism in Italy" (in Italian), thus completing his historiographic reconstruction of Futuristic ideology. Lista later explored Futurism's ties with anarchism, particularly tracing Marinetti's ties with the movement.

In 1978 he inventoried the postal innovations of the Futurists, and established a new historiographic object: "Futuristic Postal Art", proclaiming the invention of mail art by the avant-gardists of the 1920s. That same year, he began researching Futurist photography and the problematic relationship that the Futurists had with the new technological media to which he devoted several publications and a series of exhibits (Paris, Modena, Cologne, Tokyo, New York City, London and Florence 1981–2009), particularly defining the specificity of Futurist aesthetic elaboration in the fields of photo-performance, photo-collage and photomontage, the sandwiching of several negatives. He also found that Marinetti and associated Futurists held a diminished regard for photography's potential to display the entirety of human life.

In 1982 he organised the Futurism: Abstraction and Modernity exhibit in Paris, which explored Futurist contributions to an abstract art centered on the tangible experience of reality.

In 1982, and then in 1984, he published a two-volume general catalogue of the works of Giacomo Balla, a Futuristic artist of whom he later organised a major retrospective (Milan, 2008).

In 1983, in the book De Chirico and the Avant-Garde, Lista assembled unpublished epistolary documentation on the relationship between Italian and French artists. He also studied Giorgio de Chirico's role in the evolution of avant-garde artistic culture during World War I. Furthermore, he dedicated other essays to de Chirico, while also publishing a critical edition of the painter's writings on Metaphysical art.

In 1983 at the Italian Cultural Institute, Hôtel Galliffet, in Paris, he organised The Futuristic Book exhibition, which revealed the extent of Futurist innovations in the areas of books-as-objects, books-as-typography, books-as-theatre, books-as-machines, graphic compositions, words-in-freedom plates, picture poetry.

In 1985 he published Futurism, a synthesis in which he rejects the "Second Futurism" formula used in Italy to define the period following Boccioni's death. He proposes a historiographic classification by decade of the different studies on the Futuristic movement: beginning with Plastic Dynamism for the first decade, then continuing with "Mechanical Art" for the 1920s and the "Aeroaesthetics" of the 1930s. Next, he expanded on the poetics of Mechanical Art by publishing an essay on Vinicio Paladini, its originator.

In 1989, he explored the osmosis between the plastic arts and the theatre in all the phases of Futurist practises relating to the theatre with the essay "The Futuristic Scene".

In 1994 he devoted a biographical essay to Loie Fuller in which he analysed multimedia dance as an anticipation of the Futurist aesthetics of this movement. He also directed the film montage Loie Fuller and Her Imitators, which revealed Fuller's breadth and originality. That same year he also published an essay on sculptor Medardo Rosso, and assembled his theoretical writings on Impressionist sculpture.

In 1997, in the book The Modern Stage: World Encyclopaedia of the Performing Arts in the Second Half of the Twentieth Century (1945–1995), he investigates the different visual forms of scenic creation within the contemporary culture of imagery going beyond the dramatic text. In addition to traditional categories, such as opera, ballet, dance, circus and puppet shows, he lists the newer expressions of multimedia entertainment, dance theatre and artist's theatre.

In 2001 he tackled the study of Futurist cinema and advanced its discovery by organising three major retrospectives (Rovereto, Barcelona, Paris, 2001–2009). That same year, he published the book Futurism: Creation and Avant-garde, in which he considers Futurism to be the highest manifestation of an identity Kunstwollen, which has fertilised and nourished modern Italian art since the country's national unity was achieved.

In 2003, he published the book The Black Sperm (in Italian), which raises major questions on the deep connection between Eros and writing.

In 2005 he published the essay "Libertine and Libertarian", showing, beyond the protean character of Dadaism, the philosophical libertine outlook as an ideological source of Dada.

In 2009 he organised the retrospective exhibit celebrating the one-hundredth anniversary of the creation of the Futuristic movement in Milan. He took up his previous historiographic systematisation of Futurism, stressing its activist model, research in progress and the poetics of an ephemeralisation of art.

In 2011 he published the book "The Stella d’Italia" (star of Italy), an exhaustive essay on the origins and the history of the mythology of Stella Veneris, the symbol of the Italian land's identity since the time of Ancient Rome. It features an extensive iconographic setting (works of art, monuments, illustrations, posters, decorative objects etc.) about the traditional allegorical representation of Italy: a draped woman with a mural crown surmounted by a star upon her head.

Between 2002 and 2013, he published two essays, one on Enrico Prampolini, the artist who played a major role in the futuristic aero-painting, and the other on the "Vitruvian Man" by Leonardo da Vinci and the reinterpretation of it by avant-garde artists including the Futurists, the cubo-Futurists, the expressionists, and also the neoclassical artists of the "return to order" in thé Thirties and contemporary artists such Pistoletto, Nam June Pake, Dieter Appelt, Ontani and Arnold Skip.

Lista also scrutinised Antoine Bourdelle's Proto-Cubism, Auguste Herbin's abstract art and Alberto Magnelli; the theatrical innovations of Luigi Pirandello, Pierre Albert-Birot, Emile Malespine; and the dialectical repercussions and reversals of the formal ideas of Futurism as they appear in the authors, artists and neo avant-garde movements of the 20th century: Lucio Fontana, Alberto Burri, Frank Gehry, Eugène Ionesco, Arte Povera, Poesia Visiva, process art, performance and Image-Theatre.

== Major works ==
- Marinetti et le futurisme, Éd. L'Âge d'homme, Lausanne, 1977.
- L'Art postal futuriste, Jean-Michel Place Éditeur, Paris, 1979. ISBN 978-2-85893-025-8
- Le Livre futuriste, Éd. Panini, Modène-Paris, 1984. ISBN 88-7686-035-5
- I futuristi e al fotografia: creazione fotografica e immagine quotidiana, Edizioni Panini, Modena, 1985.
- Futurism, Art Data, London, 2006. ISBN 0-948835-05-2
- La Scène futuriste, Éd. du C.N.R.S., Paris, 1989. ISBN 2-222-04191-0
- De Chirico et l'avant-garde, Éd. L'Âge d'homme, Lausanne, 1990. ISBN 2-8251-2413-3
- Medardo Rosso, destin d'un sculpteur (1858–1928), Éd. L'Échoppe, Paris, 1994. ISBN 978-2-84068-043-7
- Marinetti, l'anarchiste du Futurisme (biography), Éd. Séguier, Paris, 1995.
- La Scène moderne - Encyclopédie mondiale des arts du spectacle dans la seconde moitié du XXe siècle, Actes Sud, Arles-Paris, 1997. ISBN 2-908393-41-7
- Futurism, Finest-Terrail, Paris-London, 2001. ISBN 2-87939-234-9
- Le Futurisme : création et avant-garde, Éd. L'Amateur, Paris, 2001. ISBN 978-2-85917-322-7
- Futurism and Photography, Merrel Publishers, London, 2001. ISBN 1-85894-125-3
- Dada libertin & libertaire, Éd. L'Insolite, Paris, 2005. ISBN 978-2-916054-01-8
- Arte Povera, Éd. Cinq Continents, Paris, 2006. ISBN 88-7439-215-X
- Loïe Fuller, danseuse de la Belle Epoque, Éd. Hermann, Paris, 2007. ISBN 2-7056-6625-7
- Le Futurisme : Une avant-garde radicale, Gallimard, coll. "Découvertes Gallimard" (nº 533), Paris, 2008, ISBN 9782070355556
- Journal des Futurismes, Éd. Hazan, Paris, 2008. ISBN 978-2-7541-0208-7
- Le Cinéma futuriste, Éd. du Centre Pompidou-Les Cahiers de Paris Expérimental, Paris, 2008. ISBN 978-2-912539-37-3
- Cinéma et photographie futuriste, Skira-Flammarion, Paris, 2008. ISBN 978-2-08-121828-4
- Giorgio de Chirico, suivi de L'Art métaphysique, Éd. Hazan, Paris, 2009. ISBN 978-2-7541-0287-2
- Luigi Russolo e la musica futurista, Mudima, Milano, 2009. ISBN 978-88-96817-00-1
- Il Cinema futurista, Le Mani-Microart's Edizioni, Genova, 2010. ISSN 1824-1417
- La Stella d’Italia, Mudima, Milano, 2010. ISBN 978-88-96817-06-3
- Da Leonardo a Boccioni : l’Uomo vitruviano e l’arte moderna, Mudima, Milano, 2012 ISBN 978-88-86072-62-5
- Lo Sperma nero, ovvero ‘sono dunque scrivo’, Nerosubianco, Cuneo, 2013 ISBN 9788898007332
- Enrico Prampolini, futurista europeo, Carocci, Roma, 2013 ISBN 978-88-430-6948-4
- Le Futurisme, textes et manifestes, 1909–1944, Éditions Champ Vallon, Ceyzérieux, 2015 ISBN 979-10-267-0010-4
- Fotografia futurista, Edizioni Carla Sozzani, Milan, 2015 ISBN 978 88 79 42 856-9
- Qu'est-ce que le futurisme ? / Dictionnaire des futuristes, Gallimard, Paris, 2015 ISBN 9782070450800
- Pinocchio nell’arte, Mudima, Milan, 2017 ISBN 9788899925147
- La Sculpture moderne, du primitivisme aux avant-gardes, Editions Ligeia, Paris, 2018 ISBN 978-2-9542822-3-7
- Giorgio De Chirico et l’invention du mannequin abstrait, Éditions L’Échoppe, Paris, 2020 ISBN 978-2-84068-313-1

== Interviews ==
- (in French) L'époque n'est plus au théâtre mais à la scène interview, in Libération, May 21, 1997, Paris.
- (in Italian) Era tutto di destra ? No, c'era anche la Futursinistra interview, in Il Giornale dell'Arte, April 2009, Torino.
- (in Italian) Alle origini dello stellone interview, in Il Giornale dell’Arte, February 2011, Torino.

== References and notes ==
- (in French) This article is a translation of the Wikipedia in French entitled "Giovanni Lista".
- Archives de la Critique d'Art, Université de Rennes, Châteaugiron, France.
- (in French) Archives Art Critic.

== See also ==
- Anton Giulio Bragaglia
- Art of Italy
- Futurist Architecture
- Stella d'Italia (Star of Italy)
