= Gilbert Ducournau =

Venezuelan-French cyclist

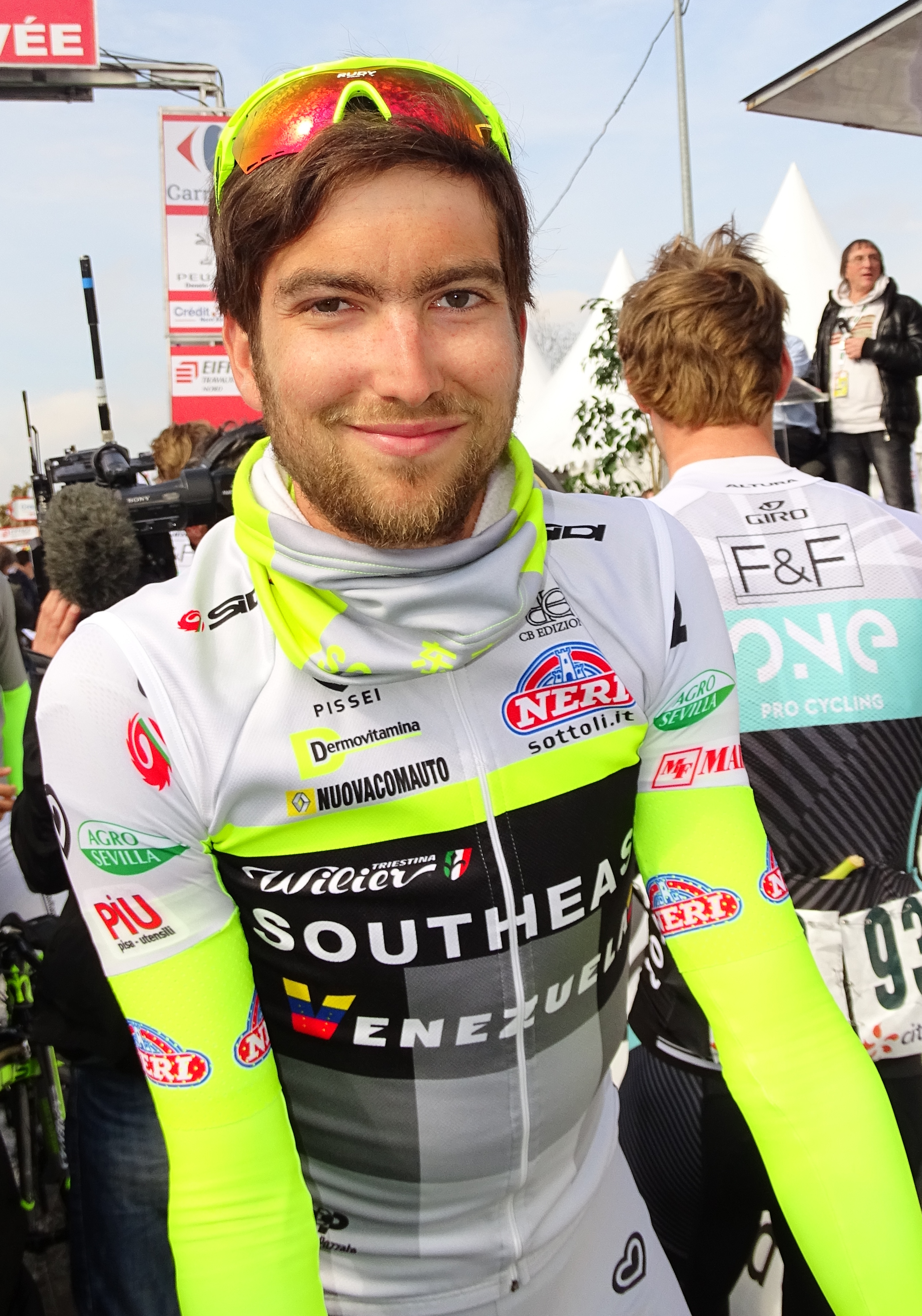

Personal information
- Born: September 25, 1992 (age 34) Caracas, Venezuela

Cycling career
- Sport: Cycling
- Current team: Vini Zabù
- Discipline: Road
- Role: Rider

Professional team
- 2016–: Southeast–Venezuela

Gilbert Eugène Ducournau (born 25 September 1992 in Caracas) is a Venezuelan–French cyclist riding for Vini Zabù.
