= Thomas Bidegain =

French screenwriter, producer and film director

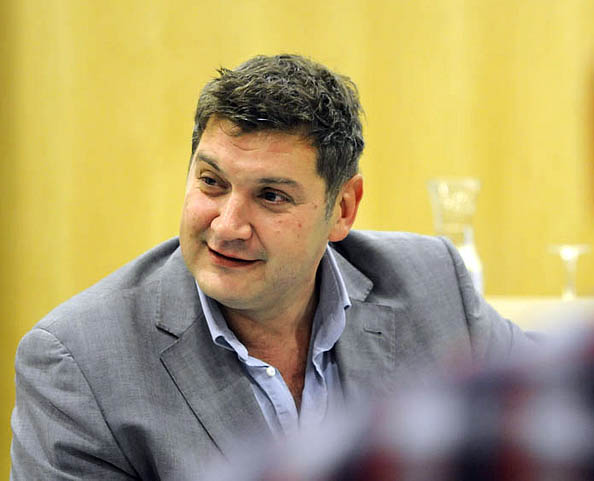
- Bidegain in 2011
- Occupations: Screenwriter, Producer, Film director
- Years active: 2001–present

Thomas Bidegain is a French screenwriter, producer and film director. He is noted for his collaborations with the director Jacques Audiard. He received the César Award for Best Original Screenplay in 2010 for A Prophet and Best Adaptation in 2013 for Rust and Bone and in 2024 for Emilia Pérez; all three wins were shared with Audiard. Bidegain's directorial debut The Cowboys premiered in the Directors' Fortnight section at the 2015 Cannes Film Festival.

His Machine TV series, co-created with Fred Grivois, took the main prize at 2024 Series Mania French Competition.

== Filmography ==
=== Director ===
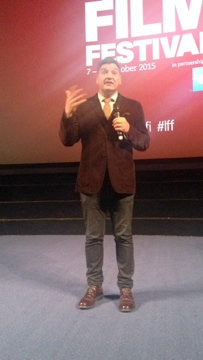
At 2015 London Film Festival presenting 'The Cowboys'

- The Cowboys (Les Cowboys) (2015)
- Selfie (segment "Vlog") (2020)
- Soudain seuls (2023)

=== Screenwriter ===
- À boire (2004), directed by Marion Vernoux
- A Prophet (Un prophète) (2009), directed by Jacques Audiard
- Rust and Bone (De rouille et d'os) (2012), directed by Jacques Audiard
- Our Children (À perdre la raison) (2012), directed by Joachim Lafosse
- Saint Laurent (2014), directed by Bertrand Bonello
- La Famille Bélier (2014), directed by Eric Lartigau
- Through the Air (La Résistance de l'air) (2015), directed by Fred Grivois
- The Wakhan Front (Ni le ciel ni la terre) (2015), directed by Clément Cogitore
- Dheepan (2015), directed by Jacques Audiard
- The White Knights (Les Chevaliers blancs) (2015), collaboration, directed by Joachim Lafosse
- The Dancer (La Danseuse) (2016), directed by Stéphanie Di Giusto
- The Racer and the Jailbird (Le Fidèle) (2017), directed by Michaël R. Roskam
- The Sisters Brothers (Les Frères Sisters) (2018), directed by Jacques Audiard
- Lady Winsley (Lady Winsley'i Kim Öldürdü) (2019), directed by Hiner Saleem
- The Bears' Famous Invasion of Sicily (La Fameuse Invasion des ours en Sicile) (2019), directed by Lorenzo Mattotti
- #Iamhere (#jesuislà) (2019), directed by Éric Lartigau
- Stillwater (2021), directed by Tom McCarthy
- The Salamander (La Salamandre) (2021), directed by Alexandre Carvalho
- Notre-Dame on Fire (Notre-Dame brûle) (2022), directed by Jean-Jacques Annaud
- A Place to Fight For (2023), directed by Romain Cogitore
- Santo Subito! (TBA), directed by Bertrand Bonello
