= Raw (film) =

2016 film by Julia Ducournau

- Theatrical release poster
- French: Grave
- Directed by: Julia Ducournau
- Written by: Julia Ducournau
- Produced by: Jean de Forêts
- Starring: Garance Marillier; Ella Rumpf; Laurent Lucas
- Cinematography: Ruben Impens
- Edited by: Jean-Christophe Bouzy
- Music by: Jim Williams
- Production companies: Petit Film; Rouge International; Frakas Productions; Ezekiel Film Production; Wild Bunch
- Distributed by: Wild Bunch (France); O'Brother Distribution (Belgium)
- Release dates: 14 May 2016 (Cannes); 15 March 2017 (Belgium and France)
- Running time: 99 minutes
- Countries: France; Belgium
- Language: French
- Budget: €3.48 million; ($3.8 million)
- Box office: $3.1 million

Raw (French: Grave, lit. 'Serious') is a 2016 coming-of-age body horror drama film written and directed by Julia Ducournau, and starring Garance Marillier, Ella Rumpf, and Rabah Nait Oufella. The plot follows a young vegetarian's first year at veterinary school, where she tastes meat for the first time and develops a craving for human flesh.

The film premiered at the 2016 Cannes Film Festival on 14 May 2016 and was theatrically released in the United States on 10 March 2017 by Focus World, and in France on 15 March 2017 by Wild Bunch. The film received critical acclaim, with praise for Ducournau's direction and screenplay, though was met with some controversy for its graphic content.

== Plot ==
Lifelong vegetarian Justine begins her first semester at veterinary school, the same one her older sister Alexia is attending and where their parents met. On her first night, she meets her roommate Adrien, who claims he's gay, and they are forced to partake in a week-long hazing ritual, welcoming the new students. They are brought to a party, where Alexia shows Justine old class photos of students bathed in blood, including one with their parents. The next morning, the new class is splattered with blood and is forced to eat raw rabbit kidneys. Justine refuses because of her vegetarianism, but Alexia forces her to eat one. Justine leaves with Adrien and later discovers an itchy rash all over her body. She consults a doctor, who diagnoses her with food poisoning and gives her cream for the rash.

The next day, Justine begins having cravings for meat, which makes her feel ashamed. After a failed attempt to steal a burger from the cafeteria, she and Adrien take a late-night trip to a gas station so no one will see her eating meat. Unsatisfied, she eats raw chicken in the morning, and later throws up a long bundle of her own hair she had been chewing on. That night, Alexia attempts to give her a bikini wax, but when Alexia tries to cut the wax off with sharp scissors, Justine kicks her away and Alexia accidentally cuts off her own finger. Alexia faints, and Justine picks up the finger, tastes the blood, and starts eating it. Alexia wakes up to find Justine doing this but later tells their parents that her dog, Quicky, ate it.

The next morning, Alexia takes Justine to a deserted road, where Alexia jumps in front of a car, causing the two people in it to crash into a tree. Alexia starts eating one of the passengers so that her sister will "learn"; Justine is dismayed. Despite this, Justine's craving for human meat grows and she starts lusting after Adrien. That night, she arrives at a party, where paint is thrown at her as part of another hazing ritual and she is forced to make out with a boy. While kissing, Justine bites the middle of his bottom lip off, leaving the other party guests shocked and disgusted. Justine returns to her dorm and takes a shower, where she picks a chunk of his lip out of her teeth and eats it. Justine confides in Adrien and they end up having sex, during which Justine tries to bite Adrien but instead bites her own arm until it bleeds profusely, seeming to orgasm while doing so.

At another party, Justine becomes extremely intoxicated and Alexia takes her to the morgue. The next day, everyone in school stares at Justine, some avoiding her. Adrien shows her a video where Justine is crawling on all fours, attempting to take a bite out of the arm of a corpse as Alexia eggs her on, to boos and cheers from a crowd of watching party guests. Justine confronts Alexia and fights her, eventually biting each other until they are pulled apart by other students. Justine helps Alexia up, and they walk each other back to their dorms. The next morning, Justine wakes up in bed with Adrien and notices she is covered in blood. She pulls off the blankets, finding Adrien dead with most of his right leg eaten and a stab wound in his back. Justine then sees a bloody Alexia slumped on the floor. Justine is initially furious that Alexia killed Adrien but then cleans Alexia and herself up in the shower.

Alexia is imprisoned for the murder of Adrien, and Justine is sent back home. There, Justine's father tells her that what happened is neither hers nor Alexia's fault. He explains that when he first met their mother, he could not understand why she did not want to be with him. Her father says he finally realized when they kissed the first time, indicating a scar on his lip. He then opens his shirt, revealing scars and missing chunks of his chest, and assures Justine that she will find a solution.

== Cast ==
- Garance Marillier as Justine
- Ella Rumpf as Alexia
- Rabah Naït Oufella as Adrien
- Laurent Lucas as father
- Joana Preiss as mother
- Bouli Lanners as the driver
- Marion Vernoux as the nurse
- Jean-Louis Sbille as the professor

== Themes ==
=== Coming-of-age ===
Raw follows Justine's coming-of-age throughout the film. The audience experiences Justine's journey into vet school and her assimilation (or lack thereof) into this new society. Ducournau throughout the film creates references to other classic coming-of-age cinema that came before her film, for example a reference to Carrie being assaulted with pig blood. The film uses cannibalism as an extended metaphor for the horror and uncertainty that can come with entering academia.

=== Sisterhood ===
Raw focuses on the central familial relationship between the two sisters, Alexia and Justine. The duality of the two sisters is established early on in the film as an idealized good girl and the rebellious older sister. The film follows primarily Justine's journey into a world where Alexia is already well-adapted. Alexia begins to have a predatory relationship, manipulating Justine into becoming a traditionally more feminine version of herself. The sister's relationship is strained later on in the movie, as the jealousy over each other's relationship with Adrien sets in. Though this strain leads to tragedy with the death of Adrien, the sisterhood remains intact.

== Production ==
Julia Ducournau answers several questions on the production of Raw in her 2017 interview with Nicolas Rapold in Film Comment. One such question she answered was in regards to her deciding on the actresses who play Justine and Alexia, Garance Marillier being a long time muse of Ducournau's, and Ella Rumpf being discovered from her previous role in the 2014 Swiss-German film, Chrieg.

The film was shot on location at the University of Liège, Belgium, a decision on Ducournau's part due to the "American" style campus that does not really exist in France, according to the director.

It took two months of pre-production prep work in Liège, followed by two months of shooting to make Raw.

Garance Marillier was replaced by a body double in the waxing scene.

== Release ==
Raw was screened in the Critics' Week section at the 2016 Cannes Film Festival where it won the FIPRESCI Prize.

During a screening at the 2016 Toronto International Film Festival, some viewers received emergency medical services after allegedly fainting from the film's graphic scenes. Ducournau said she was "shocked" to hear this during a Q&A after the screening. The film won several awards in European film festivals, including the top prizes at the Sitges Film Festival, Festival international du film fantastique de Gérardmer, and the Paris International Fantastic Film Festival. It also won Best Feature Film at the 2016 Monster Fest in Melbourne, Australia.

The film had a limited theatrical release in the United States by Focus World starting on 10 March 2017.

== Reception ==
Review aggregator website Rotten Tomatoes reports a 93% approval score based on 201 reviews and an average rating of 7.9/10. The site's consensus states: "Raw's lurid violence and sexuality live up to its title, but they're anchored with an immersive atmosphere and deep symbolism that linger long after the provocative visuals fade." On Metacritic, it has an 81 out of 100 rating based on 33 reviews, indicating "universal acclaim".

Catherine Bray of Variety wrote, "Suspiria meets Ginger Snaps in a muscular yet elegant campus cannibal horror from bright new talent Julia Ducournau." Katie Rife of The A.V. Club gave the film an A− grade, stating, "The strongest of the female-led films I've screened so far at the festival is Raw, Julia Ducournau's beautifully realized, symbolically rich, and disturbingly erotic meditation on primal hungers of all kinds."

David Fear of Rolling Stone praised the film highly, giving it a rare perfect score of 4 out of 4 stars; going so far as calling it "a contender for best horror movie of the decade".

For The Canadian Press, David Friend wrote from the Toronto International Film Festival that the film "had audiences squirming in their seats and a few queasy patrons rushing for the exits," but he noted it was "far more than a gory horror film. Director Julia Ducournau brings a sense of humanity to the story."

Nick Pinkerton of Sight & Sound gave a rather lukewarm review of the movie, labeling it "another unwieldy metaphor bundled in showy cinematography", citing the movie's "curatorial preciousness" as well as an overall insistence on contrived set pieces.

In December 2017, film critic Mark Kermode named Raw the best film of 2017.

Justin Chang of The Los Angeles Times wrote that "the fluidity and unpredictability of the human appetite is one of the movie's most playful and persistent themes."

== Awards ==
- 2016: FIPRESCI prize in the "parallel sections" category, conferred by a jury of the International Federation of Film Critics for a film at either the Directors' Fortnight or Critics' Week running parallel to the Cannes Film Festival.
- 2016: Toronto International Film Festival, third place in the audience voting for the Grolsch People's Choice Midnight Madness Award.
- 2016: Sutherland Award, for most original and imaginative first feature at the London Film Festival.
- 2016: Méliès d'Or for Best European Fantastic Film
- 2016: The film won two awards at the Strasbourg European Fantastic Film Festival :
  - Golden Octopus of the best international fantastic movie
  - Public Choice Award of the best international fantastic movie
- 2016: Flanders International Film Festival Ghent : Explore Award
- 2017: Prix Louis-Delluc for best first film
- It received four nominations at the 8th Magritte Awards, winning Best Foreign Film in Coproduction and Best Production Design.
- 2018: Australian Film Critics Association nominated for Best International Film (Foreign Language).

== See also ==
- Cannibalism in popular culture
- New French Extremity
