= Stéphanie Di Giusto =

French film director, photographer and art director

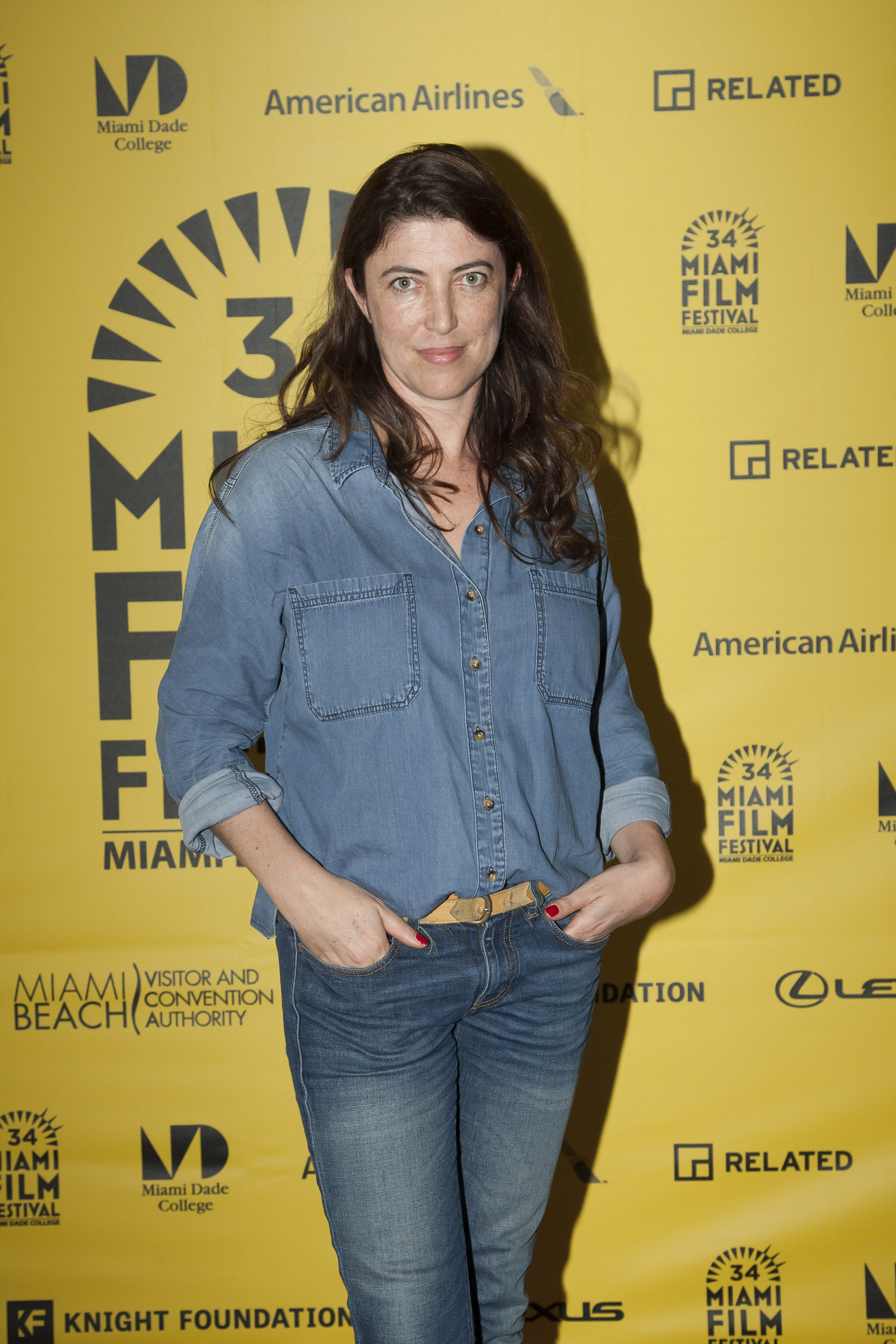
- di Glusto at the 2017 Miami International Film Festival presentation of the film The Dancer
- Occupations: Film director, art director, photographer, designer, screenwriter
- Years active: 2004–present

Stéphanie Di Giusto (also known by her former pseudonym "Paf le chien") is a French film director, photographer and art director.

== Life and career ==
After her studies at the École nationale supérieure des arts décoratifs and ESAG Penninghen in Paris, Di Giusto began her career in advertising work for Orange and designing credits for the television network France 5. She subsequently directed music videos for Elsa Lunghini, Camille, NYPC, Rose, Brigitte Fontaine and Sliimy, among others. She has also collaborated with Vanessa Bruno, creating video installations and shorts for the designer's collections.

In 2016, her feature directorial debut, The Dancer, was selected to be screened at the Cannes Film Festival as part of the Un Certain Regard section.

== Filmography ==
| Year | Title | Credited as | | Notes |
| Year | Title | Director | Screenwriter | Notes |
|---|---|---|---|---|
| 2016 | The Dancer | Yes | Yes | Nominated—Cannes Film Festival - Caméra d'Or; Nominated—Cannes Film Festival - Prix Un Certain Regard; Nominated—César Award for Best First Feature Film; Nominated—Lumière Award for Best First Film |
| 2023 | Rosalie | Yes | Yes | |
