= Julia Ducournau =

French filmmaker (born 1983)

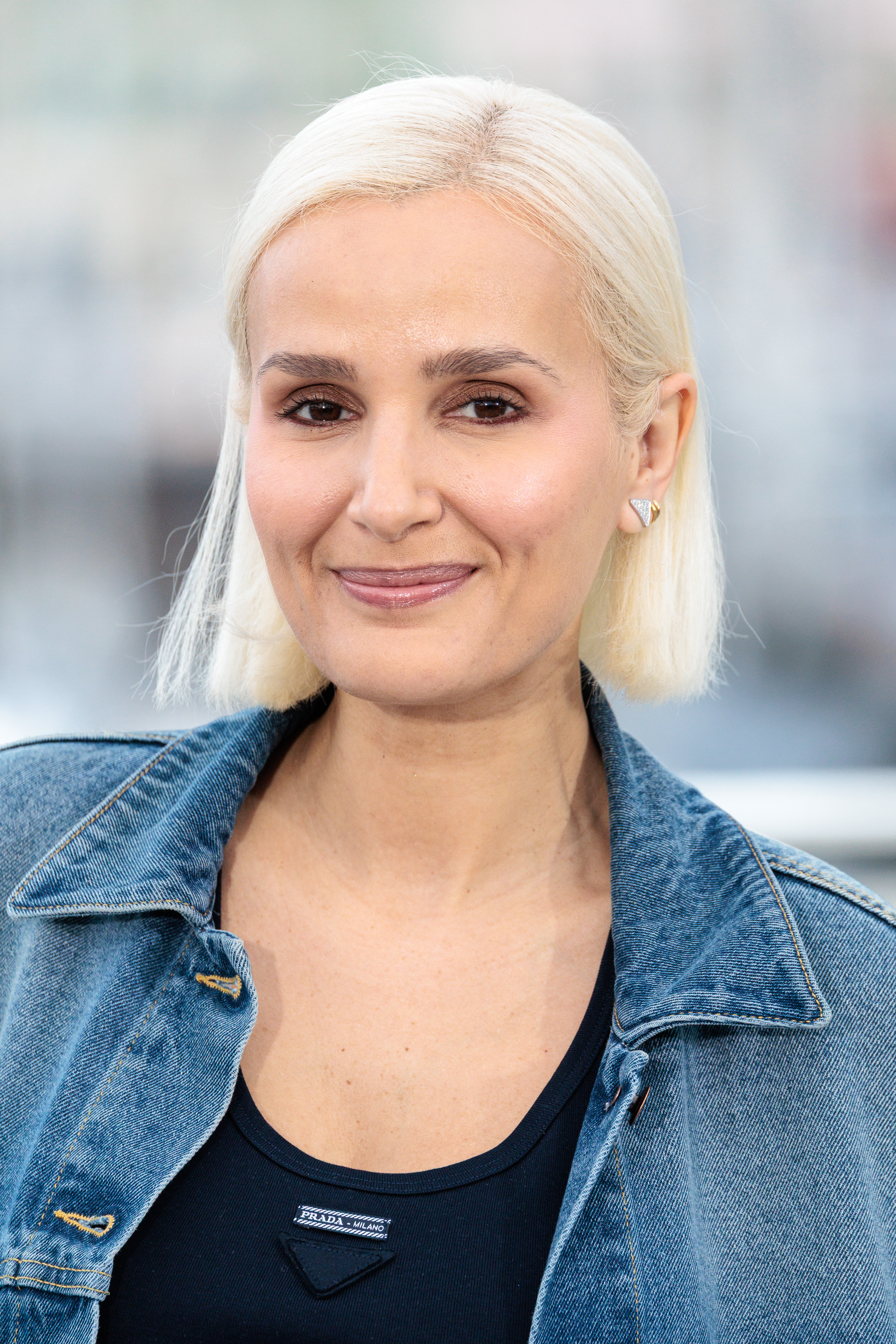
- Ducournau at the 2025 Cannes Film Festival
- Born: 18 November 1983 (age 42); Paris, France
- Education: La Fémis
- Occupations: Film director, screenwriter
- Years active: 2011–present

Julia Ducournau (French: [ʒylja dykuʁno]; born 18 November 1983) is a French film director and screenwriter. She is best known for the body horror films Raw (2016) and Titane (2021), the latter of which earned her the Palme d'Or at the 2021 Cannes Film Festival, making her the second female director to win the award as well as the first to win the award solo. Her work has received various accolades, including a second Palme d'Or nomination for her third feature, Alpha (2025).

== Early life and career ==
Julia Ducournau was born in Paris to a gynaecologist mother and dermatologist father. She is of Amazigh descent.

She attended La Fémis and studied screenwriting. Her first film, Junior, is a short film about a girl who "after contracting a stomach bug" began to "shed her skin" like a snake. In 2011, Junior won the Petit Rail d'Or at the 2011 Cannes Film Festival. In 2012, Ducournau released a television film titled Mange. The film follows a recovering bulimic who is seeking "revenge on her college tormentor." Her first feature film is 2016's Raw. The project had been developed through the TorinoFilmLab Framework programme in 2013. Raw was screened in the Critics' Week section at the 2016 Cannes Film Festival. In October 2016, Raw won the Sutherland Award for Best First Feature at the London Film Festival. Per David Fear of Rolling Stone, Raw was a contender for the "best horror movie of the decade."

In 2021, Ducournau's sophomore feature Titane was bought by Neon. For Titane, Ducournau was awarded the coveted Palme d'Or at the 2021 Cannes Film Festival where it had its world premiere. The award was accidentally presented to Ducournau at the beginning of the awards ceremony by jury president Spike Lee, although it was intended to be the final award of the evening. Ducournau is the second female filmmaker to win after Jane Campion in 1993 for The Piano, the first to win not jointly with another director (Campion had won jointly alongside Chen Kaige, for Farewell My Concubine). Additionally, Ducournau also received a nomination for Best Director at the 75th British Academy Film Awards. Titane received widespread critical praise, as reactions out of Cannes declared the film as "singular, shocking, repulsive, and incendiary" as well as receiving comparisons to work by David Cronenberg, in the way that the"body horror genre was utilized. In 2025, Ducournau's third feature film, Alpha, a film that "imagines a fictions epidemic closely inspired by the AIDS crisis," premiered at the 2025 Cannes Film Festival to polarized reviews. In an interview with Vanity Fair, Ducournau stated that "the film is so much about the difficulty of letting go." She also cited the world around her as a prime source of inspiration for Alpha. The film draws on a fictional epidemic inspired by the AIDS crisis and explores themes of stigma, illness, and marginalization.

In 2022, it was announced that Ducournau would direct two episodes of the TV series The New Look.

When discussing her motivations as a director, Ducournau stated that her aim "is to talk to as many people as possible with my work, I want to start a dialogue through my movie and to me that's the point of making movies." In addition to this, when talking with Crack Magazine, Ducournau stated that the best work happens when you transcend any sense of judgment to a point where you just try to understand your character. Her artistic process is also quite notably singular and thought provoking, as she told 52 Insights that "to be creative you have to stay angry." Rolling Stone described Ducournau's work as having the ability to craft the "vocabulary of horror filmmaking either finesse or bludgeon with a frightening degree of facility.".

Ducournau feels that when writing she should be pushing herself and what she herself is comfortable with. When writing her third feature, she ended up scrapping it saying to Vanity Fair that "I realized that I was saying something I'd already said in my two previous films, I got bored with it—and annoyed with myself for allowing myself to stay in that comfort zone."

== Theme and style ==
Xavier Aldana Reyes categorizes Ducournau's films as "Gothic Horror Heroinism." This is illustrated by "graphic body horror" shown in all of her films. According to Ducournau, her "flesh fascination stems from her childhood" since both her parents are doctors. Per Ducournau, the way in which her parents spoke about the human body growing up informed her artistic expression within her films. For instance, she outlines in an interview with The Guardian that "doctors have this very upfront yet distant way of talking about bodies and death." Alex Godfrey, Guardian journalist, illustrates this "flesh fascination" can be seen through her "unflinching" use of the camera in Raw, with "unforgiving" closeups and "atrocities un-glorified." Ducournau has likened her interest in depicting human bodies to the need for shedding layers "in order to try to be free, and basically to be ourselves- or even moreso, to become ourselves."

Ducournau's work has become known for being brutal and disturbing. In a screening of Raw at the 2016 Toronto International Film Festival, two audience members reportedly fainted and were taken to the hospital. Though her film generated a surprising response from these viewers, Ducournau remains assured in her representations of humanity through her filmmaking. The Independent's Jack Shepherd writes: "the director would rightly much rather the discussion around Raw centre on the question of what it means to be human". In their interview, Ducournau herself stated: "You have to accept some parts of us that are hard to watch, hard to acknowledge because it's in us, because it's scary." Ducournau considers the title character of David Lynch's The Elephant Man as "the essence of humanity," which she takes inspiration from in her filmography. In an interview with Vulture's Rachel Handler, Ducournau discusses her thematic interest in relating monstrosity to coming-of-age, suggesting that "the element of monstrosity in teenage years is incredibly enduring and real." She takes inspiration from artists whose work centers around monstrosity: filmmakers like David Lynch and David Cronenberg, and authors like Mary Shelley and Edgar Allan Poe. In an interview with Nicolas Rapold, she stated that she "likes to watch and make genre films that blossom from reality, from a place you don't expect". Ducournau also employs a hands-on approach to filmmaking. She exhibits technical expertise in camera techniques and control, as well as screenplay writing and storyboarding. For Raw, she wrote the screenplay and storyboarded the film's key shots. Ducournau has also discussed the importance of sound design in her films. In an interview with Letterboxd, she states that both Raw and Titane were "crafted for the theater," highlighting the use of "sub [woofers]," a quality of the cinematic experience that she describes as something you can feel through the floor and your chest.

Ducournau is also very passionate about separating her gender from her craft and from her recognition in the film industry. In a conversation with IndieWire's Eric Kohn, she states, "When people say I'm a woman director—I mean, that's always a bit annoying, because I'm a person." On her historic Palme d'Or win at Cannes, Ducournau told ABC News' Jake Coyle: "Maybe we [are] entering an era where things would be more equal in acknowledging of the work of people beyond their gender."

Ducournau has also stated that her films are often grounded in a queer lens or perspective. Discussing the matter with Dazed, she stated that she believes "my movies are queer in the first sense of the word; in the sense that defying the norm will always be fucking necessary to move things forward." In the same interview, while discussing her 2025 AIDS-allegory film, Alpha, she told Nick Chen that she is pleased with today's generation and how they are "more open-minded in terms of identity and sexuality than [her] generation." She also stated that she finds that most of the audiences that resonate with her work consist of young people. Many critics have recognized Ducournau's films have utilized body horror to visually represent themes of identity, transformation, gender fluidity, and how they all can tie together.

In regard to the reception to her work, Ducournau has stated that all of her films, even her first short, have been polarizing to some degree. When discussing the topic with Dazed, she again told Nick Chen that "it's not news. It's really something I don't care about. I don't mind [bad reviews] to a point that you have no idea."

== Filmography ==
=== Film ===
Short film

Year	Title	Director	Writer
2011	Junior	Yes	Yes

Feature film

Year	Title	Director	Writer	Notes
2012	Mange	Yes	Yes	Television film, co-directed with Virgile Bramly
2015	The Wakhan Front	No	Script consultant	
2016	Raw	Yes	Yes	
2016	A Taste of Ink	No	Script consultant	
2017	Corporate	No	Script consultant	
2021	Titane	Yes	Yes	
2025	Alpha	Yes	Yes	

=== Television ===
Year	Title	Episodes
2021	Servant	"Doll"
2021	Servant	"Spaceman"
2024	The New Look	"Give Your Heart and Soul to Me"
2024	The New Look	"If You Believed in Me"

=== Music videos ===
Year	Title	Artist
2026	"C'est à qui le tour"	Mylène Farmer

== Awards and nominations ==
Year	Title	Awards/Nominations
2011	Junior	Cannes Film Festival – Petit Rail d'Or
2016	Raw	Austin Fantastic Fest – Best Director (Next Wave Features); Cannes Film Festival – Critics' Week FIPRESCI Prize; Film Fest Gent – Explore Award; London Film Festival – Sutherland Trophy; Sitges Film Festival – Citizen Kane Award for Best Directorial Revelation; Sitges Film Festival – Carnet Jove Jury Award for Best Feature Length Film; Sitges Film Festival – Méliès d'Argent for Best Feature Length European Film; Prix Louis Delluc 2017
2021	Titane	Cannes Film Festival – Palme d'Or; Toronto International Film Festival – People's Choice Award: Midnight Madness; 75th British Academy Film Awards – Best Director (nominated); 94th Academy Awards – Best International Feature (France's submission, not shortlisted)
2025	Alpha	Biografilm Festival - Audience Award Cannes Film Festival - Palme d'Or; Cannes Film Festival - Queer Palm; Miskolc International Film Festival - Emeric Pressburger Prize; Neufchâtel International Fantastic Film Festival - Narcisse Award; Stockholm Film Festival - Bronze Horse
