= Her Way =

Her Way may refer to:

- Her Way (book), biography about Hillary Clinton
- Her Way, 1911 Rex Motion Picture Company film
- Her Way, 1913 Selig Polyscope Company film
- Her Way (film), 2021 French film
- "Her Way", song from PartyNextDoor Two by PartyNextDoor
