= Vanessa Hessler =

Italian model and actress (born 1988)

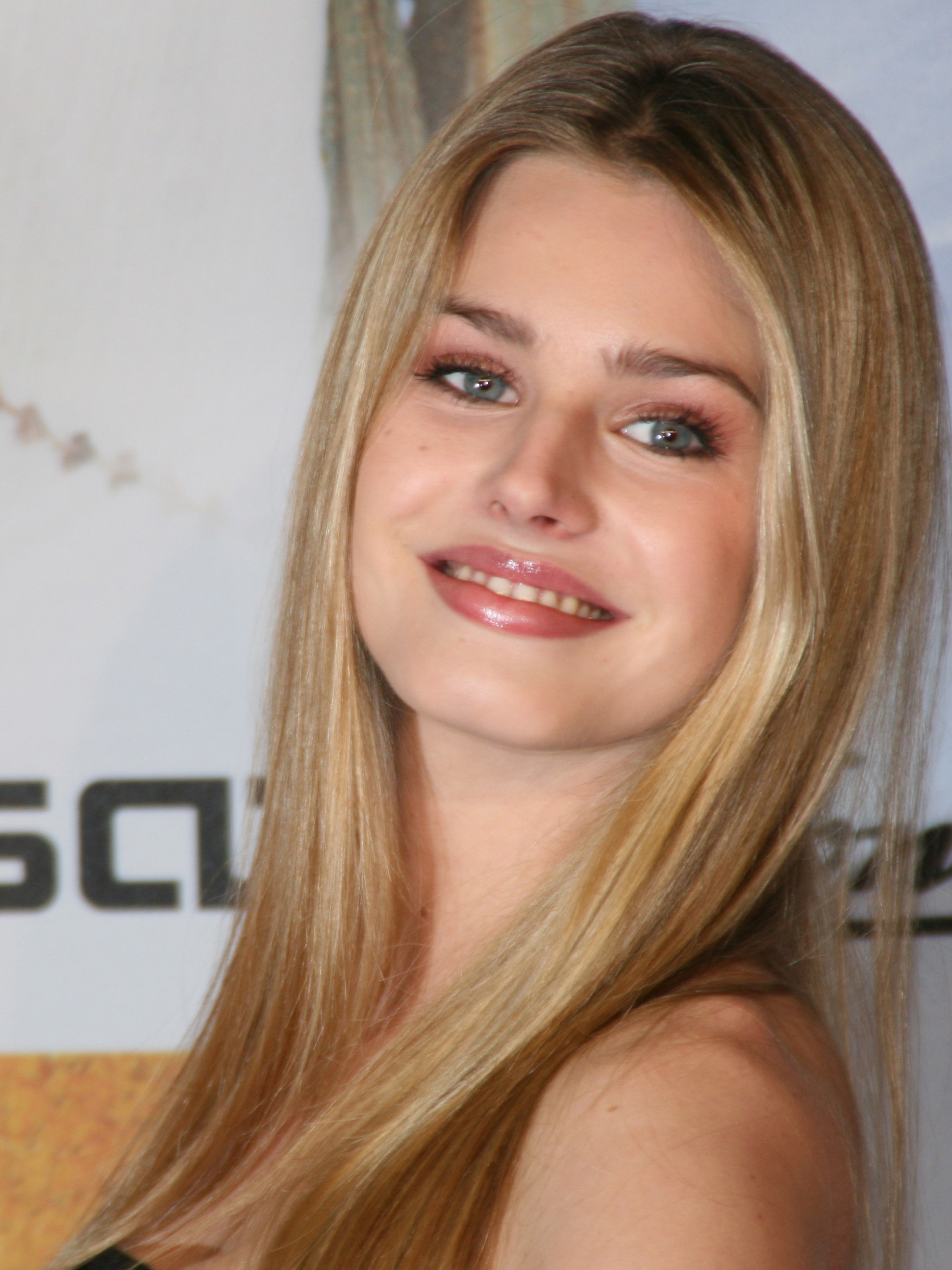
- Hessler in 2008
- Born: January 21, 1988 (age 38); Rome, Italy
- Occupations: Model, actress
- Years active: 2005–present
- Spouse: Gianni Nunnari
- Partner(s): Mutassim Gaddafi (2007–2011); Gianni Nunnari
- Children: 1
- Modeling information
- Height: 180 cm (5 ft 11 in)
- Hair color: Blonde
- Eye color: Blue
- Agency: Elite
- Website: vanessahessler.it

Vanessa Hessler (born January 21, 1988) is an Italian and American model and actress. A model since she was 15, Hessler has appeared in numerous publications throughout Italy, Germany, and France.

== Early life ==
Daughter of an Italian mother and a German-American father, Hessler lived in Rome until she was 8, then moved to Washington, D.C., her father's birthplace. She lived in Rockville, Maryland, in her early teenage years. In 2002 she returned to Italy. She speaks Italian, English, and French.

== Career ==
=== Modeling ===
Hessler worked for Donna sotto le stelle and Notte Mediterranea, both on TV. In 2004, she was chosen for Korff's advertising campaign and for Alta Roma Alta Moda, the Rome fashion week.

She lives in Rome and Washington, D.C., and appeared in commercials for Baby Star, Nara Camicie, and Gilli.

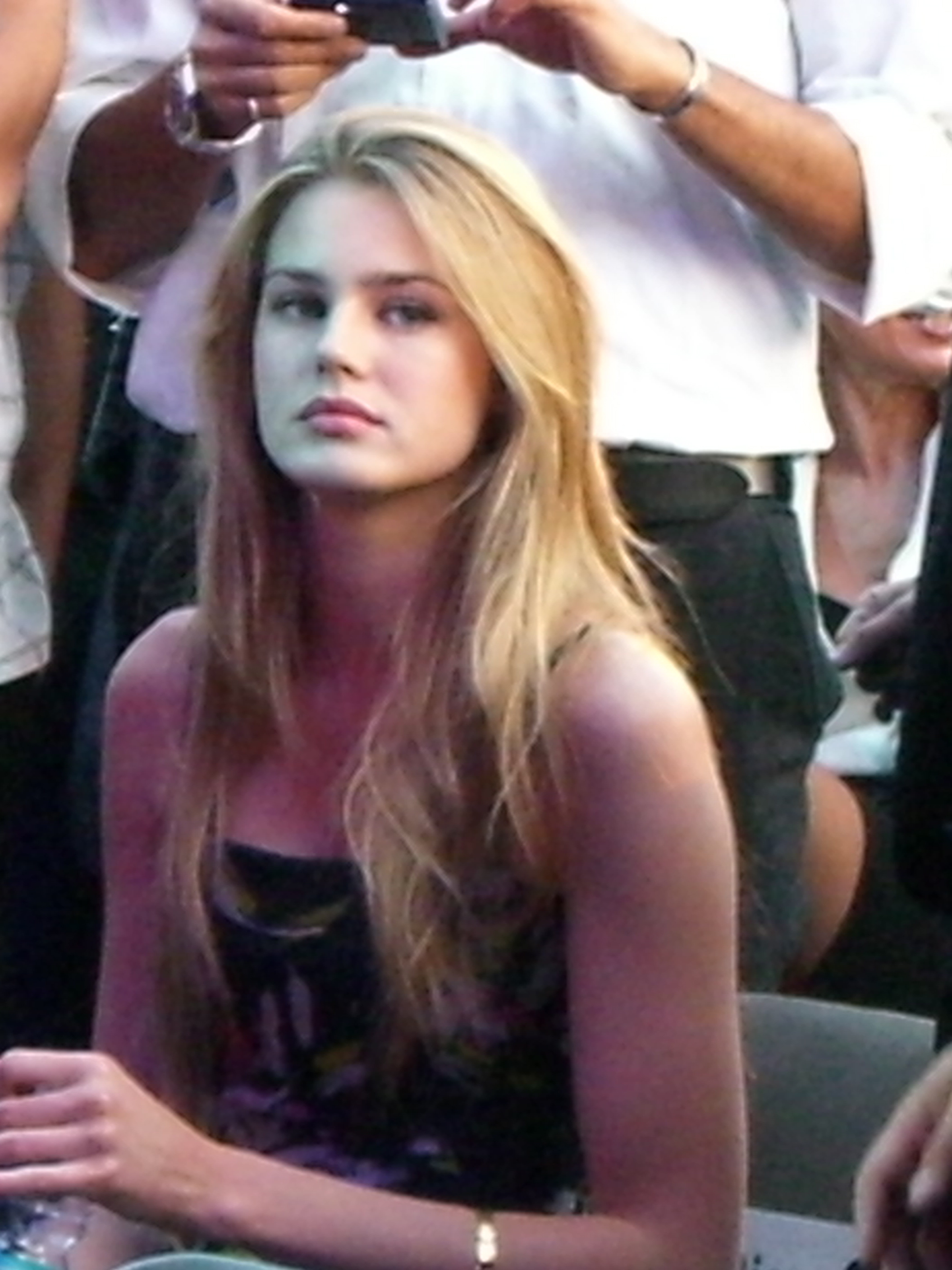
Hessler in 2008

Hessler planned to work in television, and in early 2006 she wanted to replace Alessia Marcuzzi to host Le Iene, but lost to Cristina Chiabotto.

Hessler has appeared in advertising for GUESS, Calvin Klein, Giorgio Armani, L'Oréal, and Ferrero SpA. In February 2010, she walked for the Fall 2010 Prada show in Milan.

In March 2006, she made her debut as a TV show host at the Festival di Sanremo with Claudia Cedro, Francesca Lancini, and Marta Cecchetto.

==== Controversy ====
Hessler was the face of the DSL brand "Alice" (a service of Telefónica Europe) in both Germany and France until late October 2011. Telefónica Europe decided to terminate her contract due to her personal connections to, and public support for, the deposed Gaddafi family (she having been in a relationship with Mutassim Gaddafi, fourth son of Muammar Gaddafi) – stating that she had "failed to distance herself from her comments on the conflict in Libya."

=== Acting ===
Hessler appeared in the 2005 film Christmas in Miami (Italian: Natale a Miami), along with Christian De Sica, and consequently her popularity soared. She plays Greek princess, Irina, in the 2008 Asterix at the Olympic Games (French: Astérix aux Jeux Olympiques), a film that also stars Clovis Cornillac, Alain Delon, and Gérard Depardieu. She also plays the leading female role in For A Night of Love (Italian: Per una notte d'amore), which was filmed in Italy and released in 2008 as a two-part TV special, likewise in Cenerentola (2011) and One Thousand and One Nights: Aladdin and Sherazade (2012) (Italian: Le mille e una notte: Aladino e Sherazade).

== Personal life ==
Hessler said that she had a "very beautiful love story" over a four-year period with Mutassim Gaddafi, one of the sons of Muammar Gaddafi, who was killed with his father following a U.N.-sanctioned airstrike and rebel ambush on Gaddafi's convoy in Libya, also in 2011. Hessler also stated the West had made a mistake in backing the rebels who ended Muammar Gaddafi's 42-year reign. "We, France and the United Kingdom, financed the rebels but people don't know what they are doing," Hessler told Italian magazine Diva e Donna, adding that she was disgusted by what happened in Libya and that "the Gaddafi family is not how they are being depicted, they are normal people".

Hessler is Catholic but considers herself a non-practicing believer. She had a daughter, born on November 25, 2015, with her partner, producer Gianni Nunnari, who is twenty-nine years her senior.

== Filmography ==
| Year | Title | Role | Director | Notes | Ref. |
|---|---|---|---|---|---|
| 2005 | Natale a Miami | Stella | Neri Parenti | | |
| 2008 | Asterix at the Olympic Games | Princess Irina | Frédéric Forestier and Thomas Langmann | | |
| 2011 | Cenerentola: The Heart of a Dreamer | Aurora | Christian Duguay | mini-series | |
| 2011 | Cenerentola: The Lights of the City | Aurora | Christian Duguay | mini-series | |
| 2011 | The Last Fashion Show | Brigitta Olsen | Carlo Vanzina | | |
| 2014 | What's Your Sign? | Nina Rocchi | Neri Parenti | | |
| 2014 | Reality+ | Stella+ | Coralie Fargeat | short | |
