= Laure Calamy =

French film and theatrical actress (born 1974)

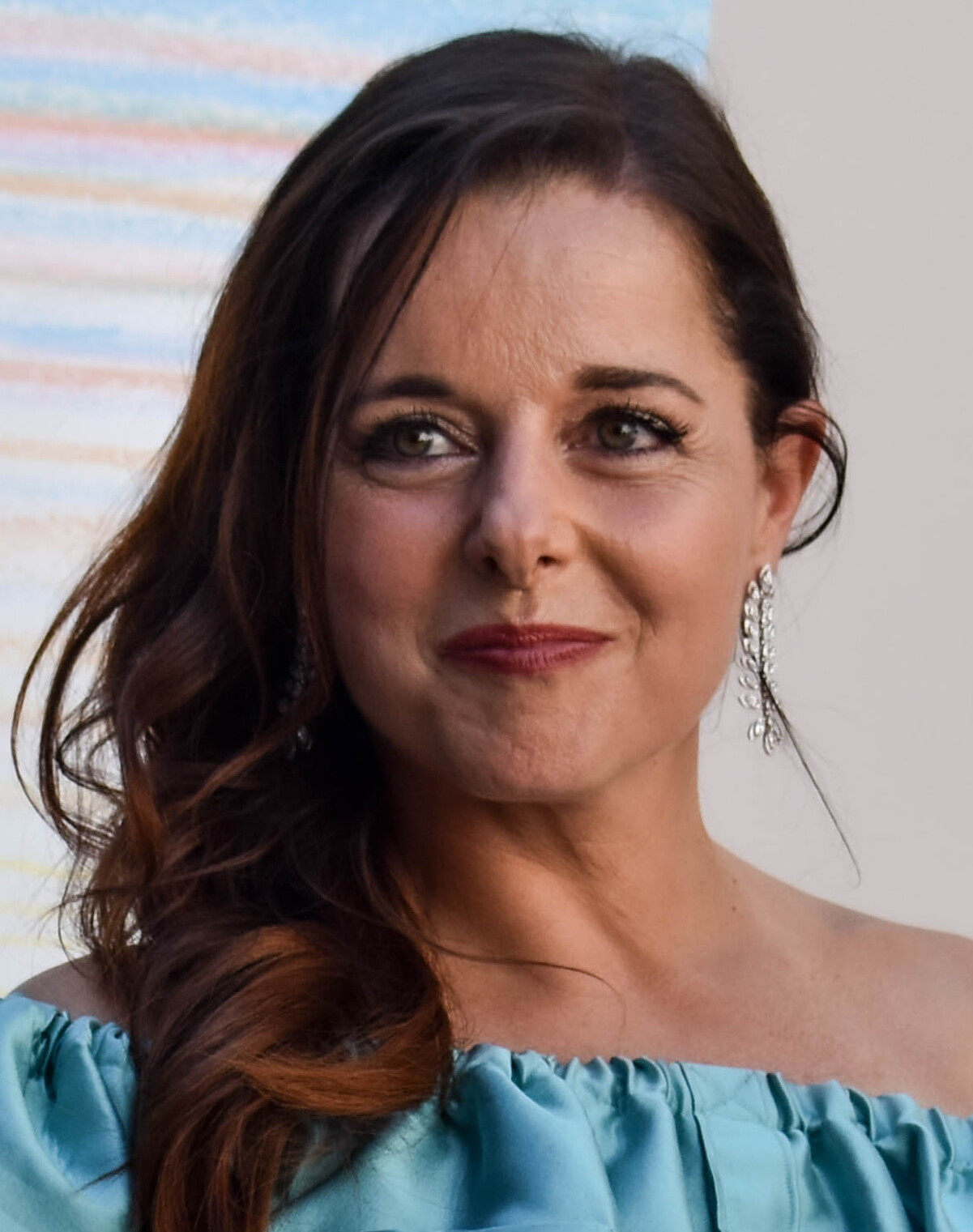
- Calamy in 2024
- Born: 5 September 1974 (age 52); Paris, France
- Occupation: Actress
- Years active: 2001–present
- Notable work: Un monde sans femmes Mademoiselle de Joncquières; Seules les bêtes My Donkey, My Lover & I Call My Agent! (Dix pour cent)

Laure Calamy (born on September, 5th, 1974) is a César Award-winning French film, TV and theatre actress best known for her roles in Call My Agent! and My Donkey, My Lover & I.

== Early life ==
Born in 1975, Calamy is the daughter of a psychologist and a doctor. She first tried her hand at theatre during her youth.

In 2000, after completing the baccalaureate, Calamy moved to Paris to study at the Conservatoire de Paris, from which she graduated in 2001. At the Conservatoire, she met Olivier Py, who directed her in Au monde comme pas y être, Orlando ou l'impatience and Les Parisiens.

== Career ==
Critics lauded Calamy's performances in the short films Ce qu'il restera de nous, directed by Vincent Macaigne, and Un monde sans femmes, directed by Guillaume Brac, for which she received the Jeanine Bazin prize at the Festival Entrevues de Belfort.

Her performance in Cécile Ducrocq's short film Back Alley (La contre-allée), which was first screened during International Critics' Week at the Cannes Film Festival, earned her a Special Jury Prize for Acting at the Sundance Film Festival.

Calamy initially appeared in feature films in supporting roles. She became known to a wider audience for her portrayal of Noémie in the television series Call My Agent! (Dix pour cent).

In 2018, she was nominated for the César Award for Best Supporting Actress for her role in Léa Mysius's Ava. The same year, she received the Molière Award for Best Actress in a Private Theatre Show for her performance in Marivaux's The Game of Love and Chance (Le jeu de l'amour et du hasard), directed by Catherine Hiegel at the Théâtre de la Porte-Saint-Martin.

In 2020, Calamy starred as Antoinette in Caroline Vignal's My Donkey, My Lover & I (Antoinette dans les Cevennes), an unexpected box-office success in France, and received positive reviews from critics. She won the César Award for Best Actress for her role in the film.

In 2021, Calamy won the Orizzonti Award for Best Actress at the 78th Venice International Film Festival for her starring role in Éric Gravel's Full Time.

In October 2025, Calamy joined the cast of Nicole Garcia's upcoming film Milo.

== Personal life ==
On 19 December 2018 more than 70 celebrities, including Calamy, responded to a call to action by the organisation Urgence Homophobie to combat anti-LGBT bullying. She appears in the music video for the song "De l'amour".

She is a member of the 50/50 Collective, which aims to promote equality between women and men in the cinema and audiovisual sector.

== Filmography ==
Key
†	Denotes films that have not yet been released

Year	Title	Role	Director	Notes
2005	Le personnage	The prostitute	Frédérick Vin	Short
2007	Chat bleu, chat noir	The nice	Jean-Louis Lorenzi	TV series (1 episode)
2008	C'est votre histoire	The mother	Alain Guiraudie	TV series (1 episode)
2009	Park Benches	Opportune	Bruno Podalydès	
2011	Un monde sans femmes	Patricia	Guillaume Brac	Short
2011	Boulevard du Palais	The doctor	Jean-Marc Vervoort	TV series (1 episode)
2012	A Perfect Plan	Valérie	Pascal Chaumeil	
2012	La fleur de l'âge	Sarah Chevalier	Nick Quinn	
2012	Ce qu'il restera de nous	Laure	Vincent Macaigne	Short
2013	9 Month Stretch	Daisy	Albert Dupontel	
2013	Passe	The prostitute	Julien Gaspar-Oliveri	Short
2013	L'albatros	The girlfriend	Emmanuel Bonnat	Short
2013	Toutes les belles choses	Jessica	Cécile Bicler	Short
2014	Zouzou	Lucie	Blandine Lenoir	
2014	French Women	Cathy Bento	Audrey Dana	
2014	Fidelio: Alice's Odyssey	Nadine Legall	Lucie Borleteau	
2014	Weekends in Normandy	Flo	Anne Villacèque	
2014	Petit lait	Suzanne	François Choquet	Short
2014	La contre-allée	Suzanne	Cécile Ducrocq	Short; Sundance Film Festival - Short Film Special Jury Prize - Acting
2015	En équilibre	Séverine	Denis Dercourt	
2015	Les Cowboys	Isabelle	Thomas Bidegain	
2015	All About Them	The aggressive	Jérôme Bonnell	
2015	This Summer Feeling	Anouk	Mikhaël Hers	
2015	Vous m'éblouissez	The woman	Marie Madinier	Short
2015	L'Amérique de la femme	Lucie	Blandine Lenoir	Short
2015–2020	Call My Agent!	Noémie Leclerc	Marc Fitoussi, Cédric Klapisch, ...	TV series (24 episodes); Nominated - ACS Award for Best Actress (2017)
2016	Primaire	Christina Drouet	Hélène Angel	
2016	Staying Vertical	Doctor Mirande	Alain Guiraudie	
2016	In Bed with Victoria	Christelle	Justine Triet	
2016	Clitopraxis	Peggy	Emmanuel Laborie	Short
2017	Ava	Maud	Léa Mysius	Nominated - César Award for Best Supporting Actress
2017	I Got Life!	Pôle Emploi employee	Blandine Lenoir	
2017	Embrasse-moi !	Fantine	Océan Michel & Cyprien Vial	
2017	Pour le réconfort	Laure	Vincent Macaigne	
2017	Bonheur Académie	Lily Desmaret	Alain Della Negra & Kaori Kinoshita	
2017	Canine panique	Madame Borota	Baptiste Drapeau	Short
2017	Holly Weed	Céline Alban	Laurent de Vismes	TV series (8 episodes)
2018	Lady J	Lucienne	Emmanuel Mouret	
2018	Our Struggles	Claire	Guillaume Senez	
2018	Claire Darling	Martine Leroy	Julie Bertuccelli	
2018	Roulez jeunesse	Nelly	Julien Guetta	
2019	Sibyl	Édith	Justine Triet	
2019	Le dindon	Clothilde Pontagnac	Jalil Lespert	
2019	Only the Animals	Alice Farange	Dominik Moll	Nominated - César Award for Best Supporting Actress
2019	Une belle équipe	Catherine Guerin	Mohamed Hamidi	
2019	Temps de chien	Judith	Edouard Deluc	TV movie
2019	Calls	Élodie	Timothée Hochet	TV series (1 episode)
2020	My Best Part	Sylvie	Nicolas Maury	
2020	My Donkey, My Lover & I	Antoinette Lapouge	Caroline Vignal	César Award for Best Actress
2020	La Flamme	Victoire	Jonathan Cohen & Jeremie Galan	TV series (5 episodes)
2021	Louloute	Isabelle	Hubert Viel	
2021	Her Way	Marie		
2021	Full Time	Julie	Éric Gravel	Won - 2021 Venice Film Festival Orizzonti Best Actress; Nominated – César Award for Best Actress
2022	Angry Annie	Annie	Blandine Lenoir	
2022	The Origin of Evil	Stéphane	Sébastien Marnier	
2023	Iris and the Men	Iris	Caroline Vignal	
2024	The Confidante	Christelle "Chris" Blandin,	Just Philippot	TV series (4 episodes)
2024	My Everything	Mona	Anne-Sophie Bailly	
2025	Classe moyenne	Nadine Azizi		
C'est quoi l'amour?	Marguerite Hélias			
TBA	Milo †	TBA	Nicole Garcia	

== Theatre ==
Year	Title	Author	Director	Notes
2001	Au monde comme n'y étant pas	Olivier Py	Olivier Py	
2002	Le Complexe de Thénardier	José Pliva	Jean-Michel Ribes	
2004	The Liar	Pierre Corneille	Jean-Louis Benoît	
2004	The Screens	Jean Genet	Jean-Baptiste Sastre	
2004	Kroum, l'ectoplasme	Hanoch Levin	Clément Poirée	
2005	The Italian Straw Hat	Eugène Marin Labiche	Olivier Balazuc	
2007	Bonjour - Où sont les mamans ?	Claude Ponti	Léna Bréban	
2008	The Suicide	Nikolai Erdman	Volodia Serre	
2008	In the Jungle of Cities	Bertolt Brecht	Clément Poirée	
2008	La Disparition de Richard Taylor	Arnaud Cathrine	Pauline Bureau	
2011	Au moins j'aurai laissé un beau cadavre	Vincent Macaigne	Vincent Macaigne	
2011	Modèles	Pauline Bureau & Laure Calamy	Pauline Bureau	
2013	Belgrade	Angélica Liddell	Julien Fisera	
2014	Man Equals Man	Bertolt Brecht	Clément Poirée	
2014-15	Orlando ou l'impatience	Olivier Py	Olivier Py	
2015-16	Les Inséparables	Colas Gutman	Léna Bréban	
2017	Les Parisiens	Olivier Py	Olivier Py	
2018	The Game of Love and Chance	Pierre de Marivaux	Catherine Hiegel	Molière Award for Best Actress
2018	Le Fusil de chasse	Yasushi Inoue	Laure Calamy	
