= The Substance =

2024 film by Coralie Fargeat

- American theatrical release poster
- Directed by: Coralie Fargeat
- Written by: Coralie Fargeat
- Produced by: Coralie Fargeat; Tim Bevan; Eric Fellner
- Starring: Demi Moore; Margaret Qualley; Dennis Quaid
- Cinematography: Benjamin Kračun
- Edited by: Coralie Fargeat; Jérôme Eltabet; Valentin Feron
- Music by: Raffertie
- Production companies: Working Title Films; Blacksmith; A Good Story
- Distributed by: Mubi (United States and United Kingdom); Metropolitan Filmexport (France)
- Release dates: May 19, 2024 (Cannes); September 20, 2024 (United States and United Kingdom); November 6, 2024 (France)
- Running time: 141 minutes
- Countries: France; United Kingdom; United States
- Language: English
- Budget: $18 million
- Box office: $77–82 million

The Substance is a 2024 body horror film written and directed by Coralie Fargeat. It follows a fading celebrity (Demi Moore) who is fired by her producer (Dennis Quaid) due to her age and uses a black market drug that creates a younger woman (Margaret Qualley) with unexpected side effects.

Fargeat wrote the screenplay to explore societal pressures surrounding women's bodies and aging. Principal photography took place in France from August to October 2022. The film is noted for its use of satire and grotesque, hyperrealistic imagery, accomplished through prosthetic makeup and other practical effects, including bodysuits, puppetry, dummies, and approximately 21,000 liters (5,500 U.S. gallons) of theatrical blood. Originally set for distribution by Universal Pictures, the rights were later acquired by Mubi after a dispute between Fargeat and Universal over final cut privilege.

The Substance premiered at the 77th Cannes Film Festival on May 19, 2024, where it won Best Screenplay and was nominated for the Palme d'Or. The film was theatrically released in the United Kingdom and the United States on September 20, 2024, and in France on November 6, 2024. It received widespread acclaim, with particular praise for Fargeat's writing and directing, the special effects, and Moore's performance. At the box office, the film grossed $77–82 million on a budget of $18 million, becoming Mubi's highest-grossing film. Moore's performance earned her a Golden Globe Award, Critics' Choice Award, and Screen Actors Guild Award, as well as nominations for an Academy Award and BAFTA Award. The film also received nominations for Best Picture and Best Director at the Academy Awards, Critics' Choice and Golden Globes.

== Plot ==
On her 50th birthday, faded Hollywood film star Elisabeth Sparkle is dismissed from her long-running aerobics TV show by its producer, Harvey, due to her being too middle-aged. Elisabeth crashes her car while distracted by a billboard of herself being taken down. At the hospital, a young male nurse gives her a flash drive advertising "The Substance", a black market drug that promises a "younger, more beautiful, more perfect" version of oneself.

Elisabeth orders The Substance and injects the single-use serum. She convulses as a younger woman named Sue emerges from a bloody slit in her back. The two bodies must switch consciousness once every week, with the inactive body remaining unconscious and fed intravenously. Daily injections of stabilizer fluid, extracted from the original body, are required to prevent Sue from deteriorating. Sue becomes an overnight sensation after auditioning as Elisabeth's replacement, and Harvey offers her the chance to host the New Year's Eve show. While Sue lives a confident and hedonistic life, Elisabeth becomes a self-hating recluse. Near the end of one weekly cycle, Sue brings a man home for casual sex; she delays the switch by extracting additional stabilizer fluid, causing Elisabeth's right index finger to rapidly age. Elisabeth contacts the supplier, who warns that delaying the switching schedule will lead to irreversible, rapid aging of the original body then reminds her she and Sue are the same person and must respect the balance or there will be consequences if disregarded.

Elisabeth and Sue gradually become separate personalities and begin to hate each other, slowly forgetting they are one person. Elisabeth resents Sue's frequent disregard of the switching schedule, causing further aging, while Sue is appalled by Elisabeth's descent into unhealthy binge-eating. Following a particularly destructive episode, Sue stockpiles stabilizer fluid and refuses to switch back. Three months later, on the day before the New Year's Eve show, Sue runs out of stabilizer fluid and contacts the supplier, who informs her she must switch back to replenish the fluid. When they switch, Elisabeth finds herself transformed into a deformed, hag-like hunchback due to delaying the switch for too long. To stop Sue aging her further, Elisabeth orders a serum designed to terminate her. However, Elisabeth, still craving Sue's celebrity status, stops before fully injecting the serum and resuscitates Sue, leaving both of them conscious. Realizing Elisabeth's initial intent, Sue beats Elisabeth to death before leaving to host the show.

Without Elisabeth, and due to most of the Termination Serum already being injected, Sue's body rapidly deteriorates. She attempts to create a new version of herself using the leftover substance, despite the single-use warning. This results in the creation of a grotesque mutated body, "Monstro Elisasue", with both Elisabeth's and Sue's faces. Wearing a mask cut from a poster of Elisabeth, Monstro Elisasue attempts to host the show, but the audience erupts into chaos and terror when they witness the monstrosity. An audience member decapitates her, only for an even more mutated head to grow back, and one of her arms to break and drench the audience and studio in blood.

Fleeing the studio, Monstro Elisasue collapses and explodes into viscera. Elisabeth's original face detaches from the gore, crawling onto her neglected star on the Hollywood Walk of Fame. She smiles as she hallucinates being admired before melting into a puddle of blood, which is cleaned up by a sidewalk scrubber the next day.

== Cast ==
- Demi Moore as Elisabeth Sparkle
- Margaret Qualley as Sue
- Dennis Quaid as Harvey
- Edward Hamilton-Clark as Fred
- Gore Abrams as Oliver
- Oscar Lesage as Troy
- Christian Erickson as man at diner
- Robin Greer as nurse
- Tom Morton as doctor
- Hugo Diego Garcia as Diego
- Yann Bean as The Substance voice

== Production ==
The Substance was an international co-production between France, the United Kingdom and the United States. Coralie Fargeat was director and producer alongside Working Title Films co-producers Eric Fellner and Tim Bevan, and Blacksmith, a Paris-based production company created by Fargeat that same year. Filming began on May 9, 2022, and wrapped in October 2022, spanning 108 shooting days. (Note: CNC states 108 days of shooting, which is confirmed by executive producer Alexandra Loewy in a separate interview. Screen Daily states 109 and the LA Times states 87 days of principal photography with 30 days for the lab shoot.) The film's budget was $17.5-18 million. (Note: $18 million is stated by the executive producer in an interview and reported by Variety; prior sources report $17.5 million.) The project took five years from concept to release.

=== Conception and screenplay ===
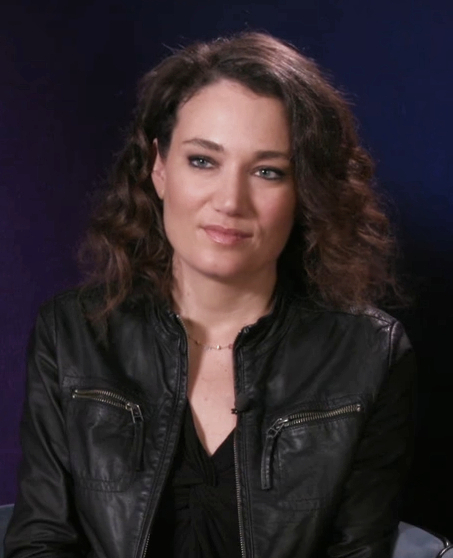
Coralie Fargeat wrote the screenplay based on feminist themes.

After the critical success of Revenge (2017) in the United States, Fargeat was in contention to direct studio films including the Marvel Cinematic Universe (MCU) film Black Widow (2021). However, the prospect of a studio film did not appeal to her, as she would not receive final cut privilege. Fargeat spent several months in Los Angeles following the release of Revenge, and began writing the first scenes of The Substance, as a spec script, at a coffee shop in Silver Lake; she became a producer to maintain creative control. Eric Fellner, who co-produced the film, traveled to Paris several times for lunch with Fargeat after seeing Revenge in 2017 to persuade her to choose Working Title for her next project. The screenplay was developed over two years, loosely inspired by her short Reality+ (2014). The script was written in both English and French, with descriptions in French, but with English-speaking audiences in mind.

Fargeat aimed to continue the feminist themes developed in Revenge, exploring the pressures and expectations placed on women. During the period when she began writing the film, she was in her 40s and was confronting negative thoughts about her relevance and appearance. "I really started to think and [have] these voices in my head like, 'Now your life is over. No one is going to care about you.'" She described the process of making the film as a way to confront and release this internalized violence, (Note: Fargeat uses the term violence in many interviews. In French, "violence" can be used figuratively in both physical and emotional senses, and includes internal struggles, moral harm, verbal abuse, harassment, and emotional distress.) using the body horror genre as a "weapon of expression".

Fargeat crafted the 146-page script with a scant 29 pages dedicated to dialogue. (Note: Kračun states between 20 and 29 pages of dialogue in separate interviews.) She has described her writing style as like writing a novel. (Note: In French: "Quand j'ai écrit le film, j'ai été vraiment très spécifique [...] C'est presque comme des romans [...]") She wrote in extensive detail; every sensory experience the audience would feel in the final film including sounds (with onomatopoeia like "splosh" and "aaagh") and sometimes even specified close-ups were written in the script.

People often ask if my characters are caricatures, and my first instinct is to say 'yes.' Then I think, 'no, no, they're not caricatures.' Unfortunately, they are behaviors that have existed and continue to exist. Here, they're just brought to the forefront and presented openly. In real life, it's not always as obvious—although sometimes it is.

— Coralie Fargeat

In lieu of character backstories, Fargeat used colors, actions, and attire to symbolize character traits — Elisabeth Sparkle's yellow jacket represented a "superhero-like" quality before her transformation, and Sue's pink leotard represented her femininity. The character Sue, described as blonde in a 2020 draft of the script, was given her namesake to subconsciously evoke Lolita and Marilyn Monroe, "baby-doll"-like iconography, and enduring beauty standards. Fargeat chose the name Elisabeth for its "iconic resonance" with stars of Old Hollywood, and Sparkle because of its literal meaning to "shine and be under the light".

Fargeat conceived the pivotal birth scene, in which Sue emerges from Elisabeth's back, while in the shower. It was the first that she wrote, and in her view, "the most important scene of the film". She recalls, "I didn't even know who my character would be. It's the first one that really came to my mind, and it holds the core DNA of the movie as a true visceral experience with no words, making you feel what the characters are going to feel". Fargeat later decided that the main character should be an actress to explore societal perceptions of bodies. She chose to have Elisabeth Sparkle host an aerobics class, inspired by Jane Fonda's transition from a successful actress to her second career starring in exercise tapes.

Fargeat listened to a variety of music to influence the screenplay. She cited Mica Levi's score for Under the Skin (2013), and other experimental music and composers that had "this kind of heartbeat or pulsation ... related to the heartbeat of the new human being or the way you can feel with your body". Fargeat also listened to hypersexualized music to influence the in-universe Pump It Up show.

=== Casting ===
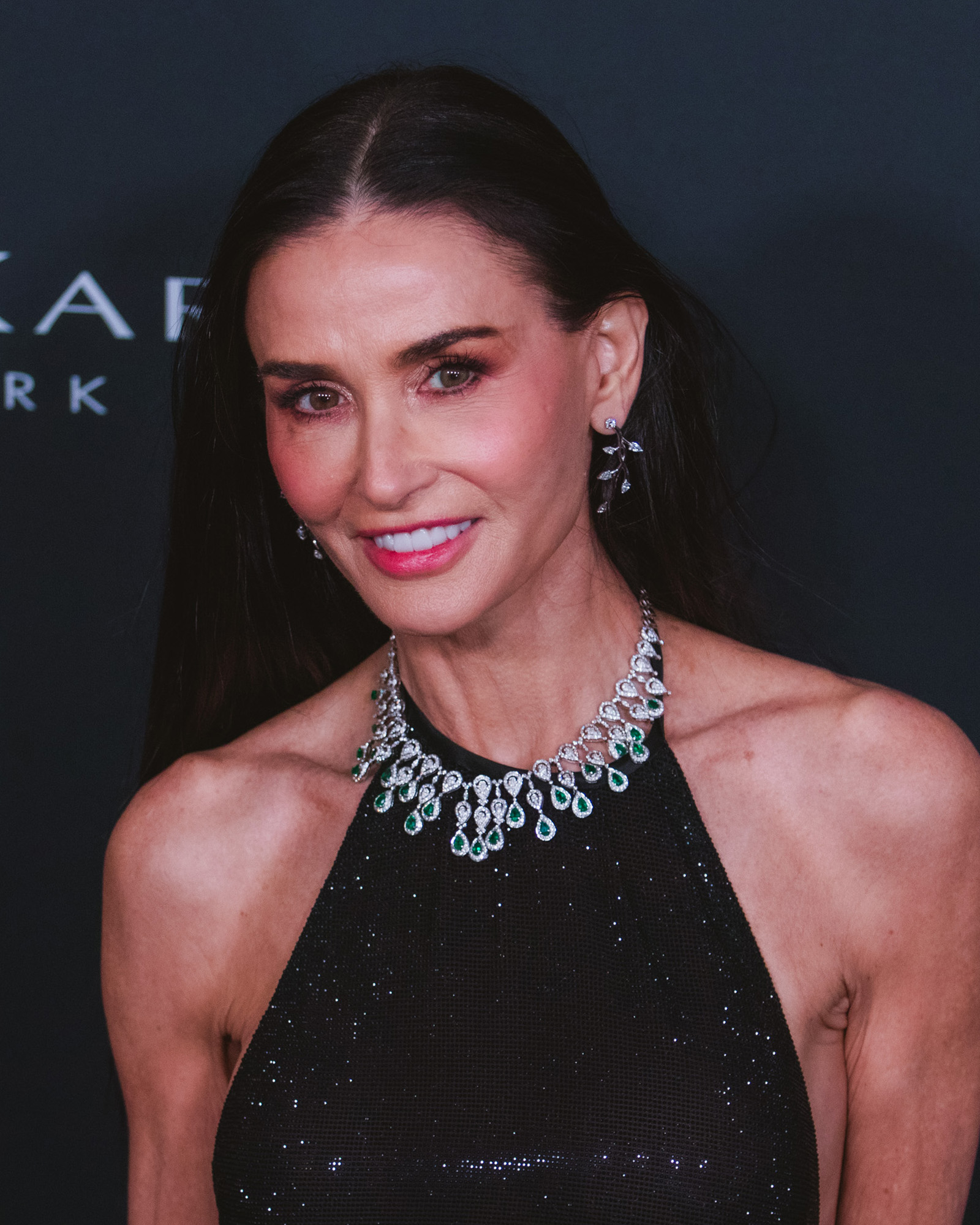
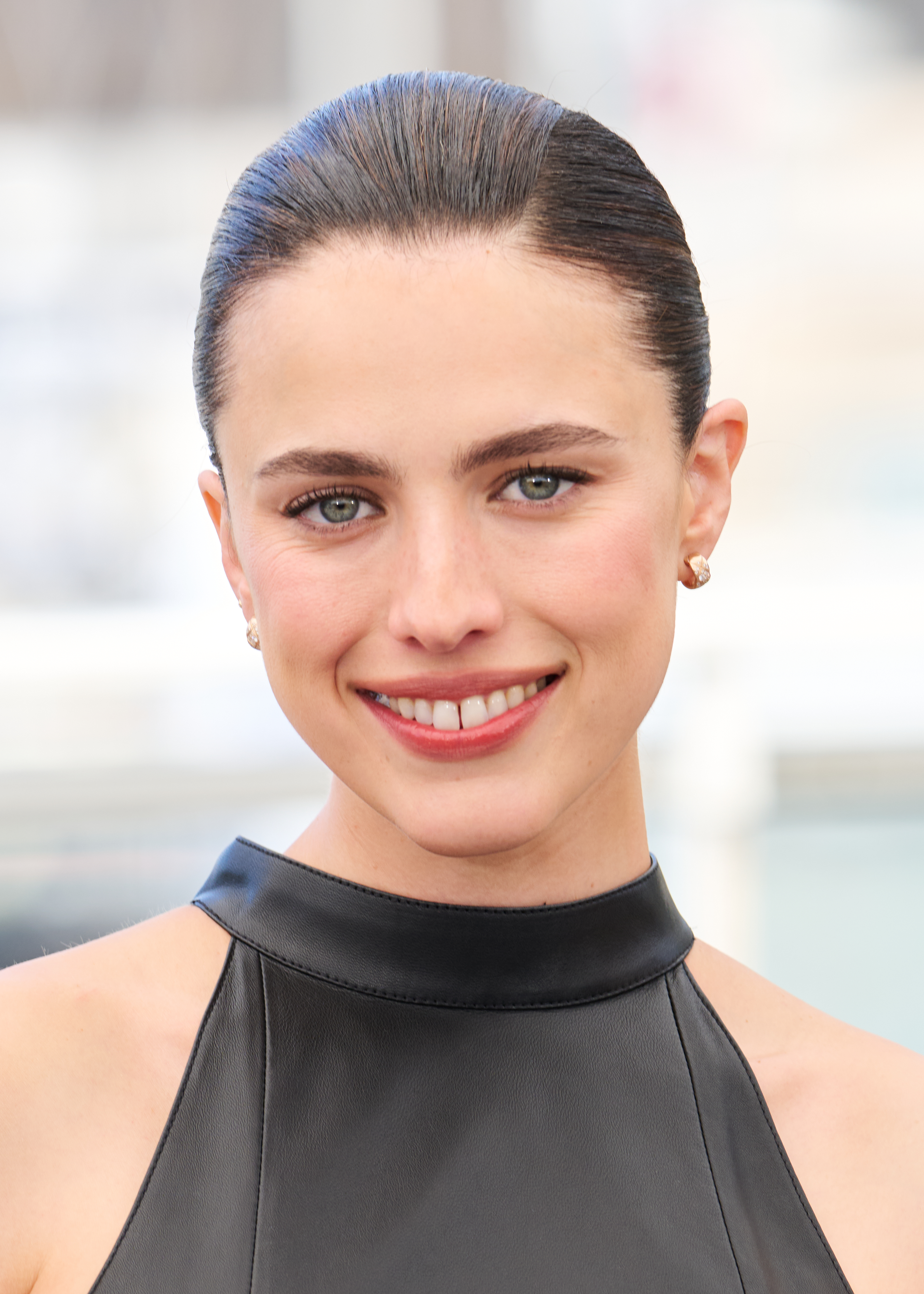
Demi Moore (left) and Margaret Qualley (right) shared leading roles; both were nominated for multiple awards.
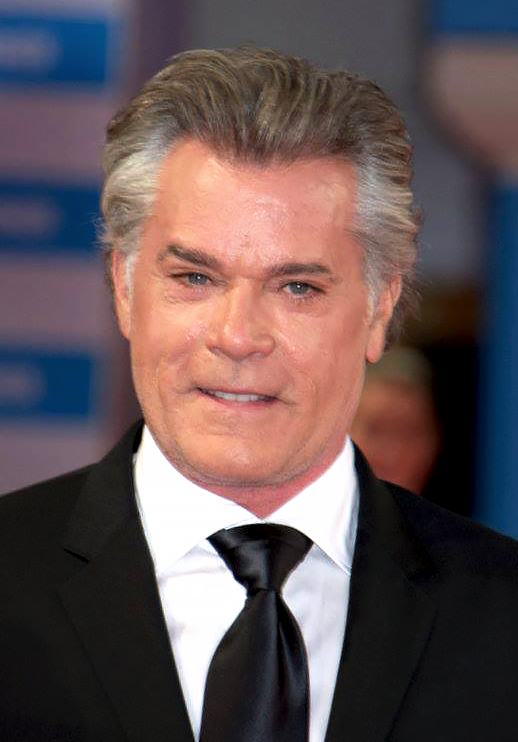
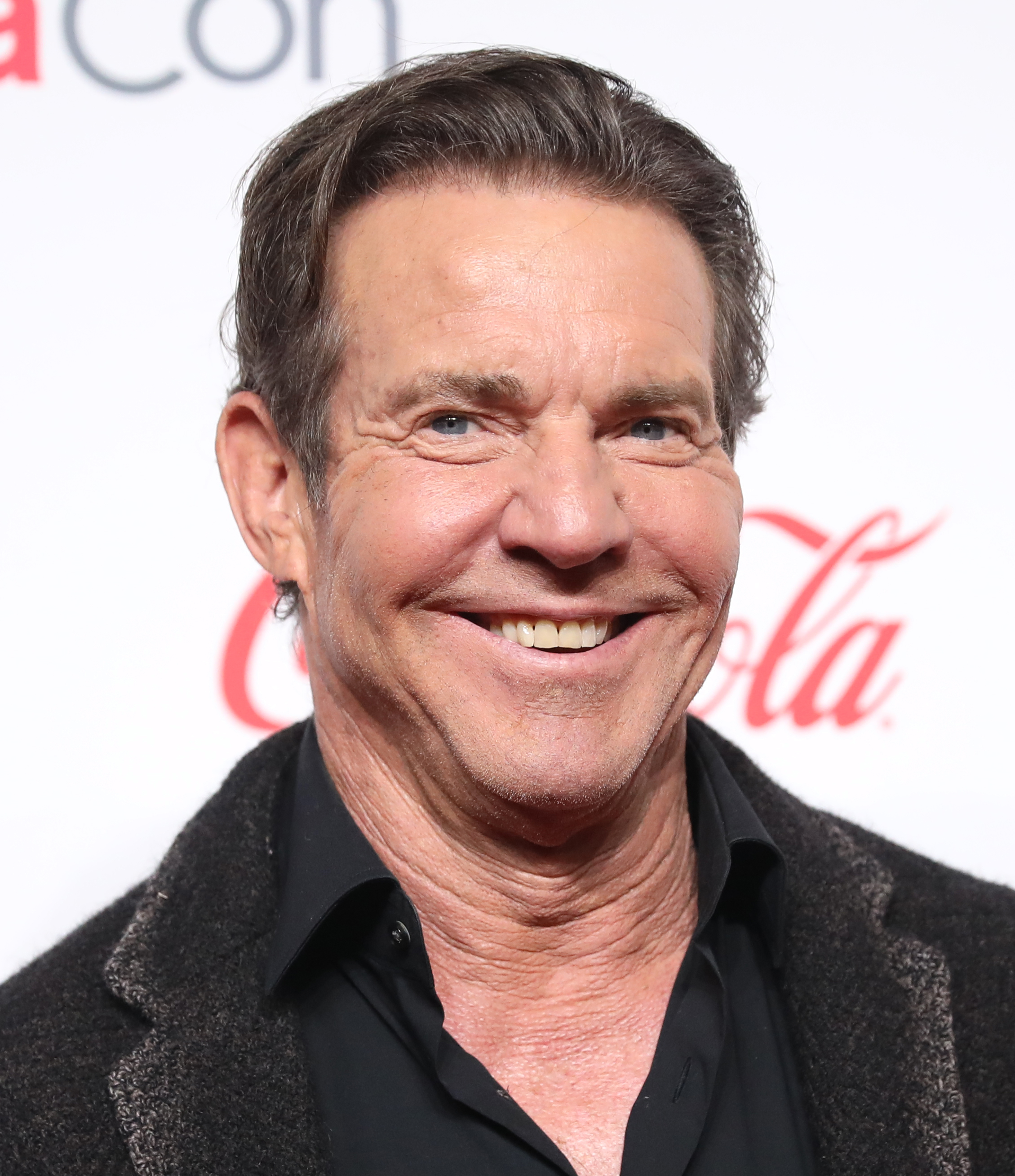
After the death of Ray Liotta (left), his role was recast with Dennis Quaid (right).

Fargeat knew that casting would be challenging, as the film features minimal dialogue and relies heavily on the characters. Elisabeth Sparkle needed to be cast first, given that she was the center of the film's narrative. Fargeat wanted to cast an actress who had been at the heart of the star system, a real-life icon. Fargeat did not include Demi Moore on the initial list of potential lead actresses, stating 'She will never do it'; (Note: In another interview, Fargeat similarly claimed that Moore would not be willing to "destroy her image" by accepting the film.) several actresses were considered but declined the role before Moore. Eventually, with nothing to lose, Moore was sent the script.

At her agent's insistence, Moore read the script before knowing specific details, later speculating that this was due to the film's sensitive subject of aging. She was impressed by the script and its subject matter, though she was unfamiliar with the body horror genre. Moore felt that the film could either "really work and be part of a cultural shift" or "be a fucking disaster". She remained unsure of the audience reaction up until the premiere when she knew the film had worked.

Surprised by Moore's positive response, Fargeat read her autobiography and was struck by her resilience. "I read her autobiography, and she had some tough years in her personal life. [...] She made herself on her own [...] in a place that was a totally male-dominated industry, being ahead of her time in many regards, like doing this naked picture of her pregnant, taking a lot of risks and having a lot of feminist statements, wanting to be paid as much as her co-stars". Fargeat had previously worked as a trainee assistant director (Note: Second second assistant director, as credited in the film's credits.) on the Moore-led film Passion of Mind (2000), handling tasks like making copies and bringing her coffee in the mornings.

Before being offered the role, Moore discussed the film with Fargeat over six meetings. Fargeat explained the film in detail: the film's extensive prep work, prosthetics, meager resources, shooting location and the level of nudity, which she felt was foundational to the story.

Moore understood the meta-nature of the role but did not feel that she was the character, as Elisabeth had no family. As she further explained, "she's dedicated her entire life to her career, and when that's taken, what does she have?" However, Moore sympathized with the character's pain. She recognized that the characters were deeply important to Fargeat, and saw them as stand-ins for the director herself: Elisabeth represents Fargeat, while Qualley's Sue is the girl from the '90s that Fargeat always felt pitted against. Moore would later reflect positively on her role, saying, "What I love is this was a rich, complex, demanding role that gave me an opportunity to really push myself outside of my comfort zone, and in the end to feel like I explored and grew not only as an actor, but as a person".

While talking to Moore, Fargeat thought about potential pairings; later, when she met with Margaret Qualley, she felt they had a common energy. Fargeat liked that Qualley had a background as a dancer. Moore had prior indirect ties with Qualley and worked with Qualley's mother Andie MacDowell in St. Elmo's Fire (1985), while Qualley knew Moore's daughters.

Qualley was in Panama, shooting Claire Denis's Stars at Noon (2022), when she read the script and was drawn to the prospect of playing a character who seemed "really far from [her]" and she had a feeling that it was going to be "special". During prep, Fargeat emphasized the physicality of the roles (both actors' bodies would be central to their performances). For Qualley, this meant lifting weights for months to achieve Sue's sex symbol figure. Qualley spent a lot of time walking around her apartment practicing her character, "freaking my husband out".

Ray Liotta was originally cast as Harvey, but died in May 2022. Three months into filming, Liotta was replaced by Dennis Quaid.

On set, Fargeat read the dialogue for the Substance Voice to provide a temporary track. After a lengthy casting process, she chose American actor Yann Bean, who was living in Paris, to voice it. Fargeat wanted a voice with devil-like, tempting, and powerful qualities.

=== Filming ===
Alexa LF camera used by cinematographer Benjamin Kračun

External videos
- Official behind-the-scenes featurette released by MUBI on YouTube, January 7, 2025 (video length: 28:15)

Principal photography took place entirely in France, with an all-French film crew except for cinematographer Benjamin Kračun and composer Raffertie (both from the United Kingdom). Studio scenes were filmed at Epinay Studios in Seine-Saint-Denis, Île-de-France near Paris—the historic studio where Jean Cocteau shot Beauty and the Beast (1946). Exterior scenes doubling for Los Angeles were filmed on the Côte d'Azur, including locations in Antibes such as the Anthéa Theatre, which doubled for a hospital, and the Marineland parking lot. Palm trees were filmed in Cannes with additional scenes shot in Nice, Carros and Saint-Laurent-du-Var. France was selected to accommodate the film's extensive shooting schedule due to practical effects work, with the country's 40% Tax Rebate for International Productions (TRIP) providing an additional incentive.

Fargeat selected Kračun as cinematographer after being impressed by his work on Promising Young Woman (2020). He shot the film primarily with the Alexa LF, for its accurate capture of skin tones, and used vintage, spherical Canon K35 lenses to accommodate the large number of close-ups in the film. Other lenses included Angénieux Optimo zooms, Leitz Thalia, macros from Cooke Optics and Arri and a Leitz M 0.8 for the body-camera work. Red V-Raptor and Komodo were also used: the former for visual effects, with its high resolution 8K sensor, and the latter for the body, requiring a helmet rig.

The film was shot in continuity when possible, adopting what the crew called a "lab shoot" approach in its final month. The "lab shoot" was used to capture insert shots, typically assigned to a second unit with a reduced crew. The most time-consuming prosthetics shots were filmed during this time period, including close-ups of injections and a back splitting open. Fargeat storyboarded all the prosthetics and birth sections before production began, focusing on the birth scene first during pre-production. This helped estimate financial costs for the prosthetic dummies, how many to build, and the extent of their body details. The birth sequence took 15 days to film. Fargeat even went so far as to perform an actual syringe injection of the activator on her own arm, doubling for Demi Moore in the shot. Crew sizes fluctuated significantly throughout production, ranging from just 6 members for the lab shoot, 8 for exterior scenes, and over 200 for complex practical effects sequences in the studio.

Kračun initially considered using a safety wire to drop a camera past a series of lights for the infinity tunnel sequence. Ultimately, he devised a simpler solution: two horizontal bicycle tires surrounded by LED tube lights, spinning together at the same speed around a stationary camera to create an infinity tunnel effect. He decided to film the fire in the shape of a dragon on the studio floor practically, capturing it from above. The footage was then blended into the scene where Sue is seen by the window.

For his lunch scene with Demi Moore, Quaid consumed approximately 2 kilograms (4.4 lb) of shrimp. (Note: Fargeat puts the estimate at 2 kilograms in an interview, while Moore states it was about 4 pounds (1.8 kg).)

Margaret Qualley lightheartedly described learning the choreography for The Substance as a "nightmare" and was overwhelmed by performing with professional dancers who had already memorized the moves which she was new to. Although trained as a ballet dancer, she explained that "that specific kind of sexuality doesn't lend itself to [me]" and that she'd "never [do it] again". Qualley began the rehearsal with Fargeat present but left the set to go to the bathroom and cry. Fargeat decided to leave the rehearsal as well; Qualley instead chose to learn the moves in a private lesson, allowing her to practice in her hotel room and build confidence as she felt deeply ashamed by the whole series of events. Nonetheless, on the day of the shoot, her anxiety led her to get "wasted first thing in the morning" by smoking cannabis and drinking tequila. In a live Q&A after the film's release, Qualley expressed happiness in getting to perform the dance, as many previous scenes had been slow-paced and required minimal movement or expression, making the dance sequence a welcome change.

Moore found Fargeat to be a "very visual director" with a focus on symbolism. While Moore was accustomed to starting scenes with wide shots to establish the scene's space, Fargeat instead began with close-ups. Moore found that "the actor's part of it is not as ... important" to Fargeat: "it's not necessarily where she's as focused". Moore described this as "not good or bad, just kind of different". Fargeat praised Moore's body language in the film; Moore chose to express Elisabeth through subtleties, such as her eyes and other simple expressions. She worked with a movement coach over Zoom for her character's later scenes, where she is forced to move quickly while hunched over due to physical disfigurement.

During a one-week break while only Qualley was working, Moore contracted shingles and lost 20 pounds (9.1 kg) during the production.

Initially, two days of exterior shooting were planned in Los Angeles. However, after Kračun filmed test shots of palm trees early on during filming, Fargeat realized she could use these shots as tableaux, and eliminate extensive exterior shots. Ultimately, the only part of the film actually shot in Los Angeles was the still backdrop (photographed by Rosco Digital) in the Canyons.

Filming of the theater scenes took nearly three weeks. The special effects team utilized around 21,000 litres (5,500 US gal) (Note: The American press has reported the amount of fake blood as between 30 and 36,000 gallons with the majority of articles claiming 30,000 gallons. Fargeat estimates 36,000 gallons for Entertainment Weekly, however, in a later franceinfo interview (in French) she initially states 36,000 gallons before being corrected off-camera to 21,000 litres (5,500 US gal). For AwardsWatch, Persin recalls the total as about 25,000 litres (6,600 US gal) but also estimates "4,000 gallons, maybe more". An article in Screen International states 5,000 gallons.) of fake blood and a fire hose. The shots of the audience being sprayed with blood in the climax were achieved in one take. Kračun was surprised by the amount of blood remarking, "Coralie said at one point, 'I want to have fire engines full of blood spraying the audience,' and I thought, 'Oh, maybe that's just a French way of saying there's going to be a lot of blood,' but no, she really wanted a hose full of blood in the audience, in the theater, and it was going to be a lot of blood!" It became a significant technical challenge of how to control the spread, pressure, and quantity of blood, how to waterproof the filming equipment, and how to keep everyone safe. Showers were set up outside the theater set for the extras. During the shoot, Kračun hid himself in the audience and filmed while Fargeat operated another camera and controlled the hose. Once Fargeat and Kračun were on set covered in blood, they hugged each other and said, "We did it."

=== Sets ===
That's the most important thing for me [...] why the images came the way they came, even if they don't make sense from a realistic point of view. [...] We don't care that it's not possible, because this is not reality. It's The Substance's reality.

— Coralie Fargeat

The Substance required a three-month construction period to build the sets, including Elisabeth's apartment with distinct spaces like the bathroom and secret room as well as the New Year's Eve theater and a TV studio hallway. The central feature of the apartment set was the large panoramic window, symbolizing Elisabeth's past and, later, Sue's rebirth and future. Fargeat envisioned the apartment with a "timeless, old-fashioned but also futuristic quality", allowing it to transcend specific eras and enrich the story with symbolism. Initially, Fargeat and Kračun considered LED-screen technology from Darkmatters for the window's scenic Los Angeles cityscape, but Kračun determined it was costly and technically challenging, involving nine technicians to operate. He additionally felt that LEDs could not achieve Fargeat's vision of hard sunlight for Los Angeles. Instead, they opted for a 115 ft x 42 ft Rosco SoftDrop backdrop, evoking a romantic, Hitchcockian quality; Kračun described the overall look of the film as "pink noir". Fargeat expressed great satisfaction seeing the practical set for the first time as she had anticipated shooting it on greenscreen.

Fargeat wanted the bathroom set to function as a metaphorical "cocoon" and envisioned it as a mental space that felt abstract, stylized, and empty. She pushed back against the production designer who wanted a more realistic look and who asked: "Are you sure you don't want any furniture in the bathroom at all?" Kračun wanted sconces to help modify the lighting but Fargeat ultimately rejected this idea, and the lighting was kept harsh.

During the birth scene's point-of-view shot, two identical bathroom sets were built to simulate a mirror: Qualley acted in one, while Kračun (wearing a head-mounted camera) and a body double mimicked her movements in the other. The hand movements on the mirror were later reshot in post-production in front of a green screen due to difficulties syncing the movements. For some shots, an actual mirror was placed between the two bathrooms to capture Qualley's reflection. The scene with Moore lying on the floor and striking her head, while the camera booms up, was shot fully in camera and achieved by constructing a shower three times taller than standard height.

After the production finished shooting on the apartment set, it was destroyed to build the theater in the same space, being "basically [...] built on the ashes of the apartment" according to Fargeat. Initially, there were plans to shoot in a real theater that was going to be refurbished completely, but the crew discovered that the venue, while initially welcoming at the idea of shooting a small splattering of blood, became apprehensive upon realizing the extent of the blood effects. As one producer remarked, "Okay, I don't want to finish in jail. We can't shoot in a real theater, because there is no way we can protect it in a way that it's not going to be destroyed".

=== Costumes ===
The poster for La Reine Margot (1994) was cited among the influences for the costume design.

Costume designer Emmanuelle Youchnovski was hired on the film after reading the script and creating a Pinterest board to show Fargeat. She drew inspiration from fashion photos and the poster for the film Queen Margot, in particular for the Monstro finale.

Youchnovski developed contrasting looks for Elisabeth and Sue. Elisabeth's design emphasized masculinity, using suits with minimal skin exposure, shiny fabrics, and primary colors like blue, red, and black. For Elisabeth's yellow coat, Youchnovski purchased 20 options; unhappy with their fit and color, finding them too mustard or too green, she sketched a design and she and her team made the coat using fabric sourced from London in a month. The yellow coat matched sunshine and egg hues found in the film, and enveloped Elisabeth "like armor" with its wide shoulders and large pockets. During preproduction, Moore initially questioned the exaggerated choice, noting that no one in Los Angeles would wear a heavy coat in summer, but Fargeat said that it was essential to her character. After production ended, Moore took the yellow jacket as a keepsake.

Sue's wardrobe emphasized femininity, exposing her body, focusing on clichés associated with the male gaze, including pink metallic colors, black Louboutin boots and a tennis skirt. Her pink leotard was inspired by Beyoncé in the music video for "Blow" and an outfit worn by Dua Lipa during her concerts. Sue's clothing becomes darker as the film progresses and was designed thematically to represent danger and snake-like qualities. Her custom-made bomber jacket features the letter "S" on the back for "Sue" and for "Snake" and her catsuit as a second skin. Youchnovski had to redo the snakeskin pattern on the catsuit as the initial attempt wasn't shiny enough. Sue's dragon robe, representing rebirth and domination, required the most work, with 10,000 sequins attached by hand over 2 months.

For Monstro's dress, Youchnovski first designed the version for Monstro, then adapted it for Qualley, reversing her usual process since she didn't have access to Qualley in the prosthetics. She surveyed the prosthetic in London and fitted the costume to a mockup of Monstro, struggling with the design of the top due to Monstro's number of breasts.

Youchnovski dressed Harvey in colorful Etro and Dolce & Gabbana suits. She explained: "I wanted his style to be very strange. Like what rich people wear."

Youchnovski emphasized the motif of the spinal column in the costumes. Elisabeth appears at the beginning of the film, before taking the substance, with an open-back dress. After taking the substance, she appears in a red Balmain dress with a zipper, while Sue mirrors this design choice by donning a catsuit, also featuring a zipper. Moore and Qualley had approximately three fittings each, with Youchnovski focusing on ensuring that the leotard was comfortable and the character's silhouette was clearly defined. She would then sketch the look, adjusting color or other details as needed.

=== Post-production ===
External videos
- Official VFX breakdown on YouTube, April 4, 2025 (video length: 4:01)

Fargeat described post-production as the most challenging period of the production, taking a year and a half. With over 300 hours of dailies, one of the main challenges was finding the right pacing for scenes with little dialogue. Scenes were frequently changed based on the interaction of the music, visual effects and sound design, with post-production finishing just three days before the premiere. Visual effects by NOID Studio took one year to complete.

The film was edited by Jérôme Eltabet, Fargeat, and Valentin Feron. Eltabet had previously collaborated with Fargeat on Revenge and taught her editing while working her children's show Les Fées Cloches He began editing midway through the shoot, approximately three months in and independently created the film's initial 3.5 hour rough cut, which did not include many of the inserts or closeups. After filming wrapped, Eltabet and Fargeat collaborated over six months bringing the runtime to 4.5 hours. Eltabet and Fargeat collaborated by editing separate sequences in different rooms using Adobe Premiere Pro, then swapping the sequences between each other for further refinement. Due to the film's numerous iterations with some sequences having between 150 and 200 different versions, Feron was later brought in to give a new, outside perspective to the film. Several scenes with Elisabeth's agent were shot but ultimately not included as they were not deemed compelling according to Eltabet. He found the theater climax the most difficult to cut, as he had to edit around prosthetics that did not always look convincing.

For the sound design, Fargeat placed sound effects and notes in the editing software timeline for sound designers and editors Valérie Deloof and Victor Fleurant. The team was tasked with finding the right textures, effects, and tone for each scene, using exaggerated or realistic sounds to explore deeper meanings. For example, a chainsaw was used for the electric mixer in Elisabeth Sparkle's cooking scene, and pistol handling sounds were used for the triggering of the capsule during injection shots.

For the first person view shots in the birth sequence, Fargeat wanted Sue's movements to sound as if immersed in amniotic fluid. To achieve this, the sound team placed microphone capsules in the actors' ears to capture breathing through cranial resonance. Simultaneously, a boom mic and a high-frequency mic captured audio to allow for further edits or to switch to an external viewpoint.

For scenes with Harvey, the team wanted to emphasize his larger-than-life character. Before entering a scene like the bathroom or restaurant, sounds were mixed realistically. Once on screen, they became heightened; for example, for the restaurant, sounds were layered emphasizing his eating and the juiciness of the shrimp. Ambient sounds and music in the restaurant were muted at this point. When Harvey enters his office, the sound team emphasized the "blinged-out heaviness" of his boots.

The team created soundscapes to enhance the film's visuals and themes. When Elisabeth leaves to retrieve the substance, the sound design shifts from a noisy street to deserted suburbs with dogs, police sirens, and crows used to foreshadow danger. Inside the storage facility, sounds were shaped musically with metallic materials and sustained notes to give a feeling of discomfort, and then drawn back to only a low and clinical neon light.

For the low-angle shot of "Gollum" banging on the bathroom door, visual effects were used to combine Moore's prosthetics with the prosthetics on the thinner body double.

When projected for Kračun, the film appeared too sharp, so it was downscaled to 2K and then upscaled to 4K to retain the softness he found on the set. When Sue is on the TV show, the footage was kept at the original pre-processed 4K for a sharper look.

== Music ==
The film score was conceived by British producer and composer Raffertie, who became involved late into the post-production around January 2024. He was given only a few months to complete the score. As per Fargeat's interest, Raffertie produced an electronic score that focused on the duality between Elisabeth and Sue, ranging from organic and nostalgic, to synthetic and contemporary.

== Design and effects ==
External image
- Official lookbook released by MUBI, containing images which inspired the screenplay (92 pages)

Fargeat used practical effects including extensive prosthetics and makeup, accounting for 70–80% of effects in the film. She resisted the push toward cheaper digital effects and has stated that the use of practical effects was crucial to convey the themes of violence.

The effects were created by Pierre-Olivier Persin and his company, Pop FX, based in Montreuil, Paris. Leading a team of 15, Persin oversaw the work both at Pop FX's studio and at a second rented workshop. Persin dedicated 11 months to the project, spanning pre-production and shooting. He was hired at the recommendation of executive producer Nicolas Royer (who appears in the film as "guy in the elevator" and previously worked with Persin). Initially, Fargeat had chosen another company to create the designs but was disappointed with their work. Persin later described their designs as good from an artistic perspective, but overly masculine—"a rubber monster for the guys." Meanwhile, Fargeat had always envisioned the film ending with a monster that she referred to as a "Picasso of male expectations".

Persin read the script, made a bid, and, while working on another project, sculpted a small plasticine maquette (mockup) of his design for the creature at the climax, "Monstro Elisasue", (Note: The monster is instead referred to as MonstroElisaSue (without spaces) in the 2020 draft and shooting script and as MONSTROELISASUE in the film credits.) over a few nights. In the script, Monstro Elisasue was loosely outlined, only described as having Elisabeth's face located on its back. Persin wanted to give Monstro some "humility" and "gracefulness" and for her to resemble Sue. Fargeat was impressed with his choices, such as the tilted head, backward-facing arm, and the inclusion of breasts, and offered him the position. Fargeat and Persin later spent a month refining Monstro's design. Persin would later remark in an interview: "Coralie wanted her as if the body was put in a shaker."

Persin and Fargeat conducted a technical read-through over several days, outlining the requirements of each sequence. Persin visualized Fargeat's ideas for each transformation with Photoshop, digital sculpture, and regular sculpture. He created designs based on digital scans of the actors, which Fargeat could select, combine, or modify prior to the creation of actual prosthetics for screen tests.

Elisabeth's transformation process was organized into a series of five stages, following the birth of Sue: a withered finger ("The Finger"), a more aged look called "Requiem" (inspired by Requiem for a Dream), a hunched-backed design referred to as "Gollum", "Monstro Elisasue", and "The Blob". Fargeat deliberately sought to avoid making the effects look realistic, aiming instead to create a deformed representation of the aging process, shaped by the characters' fear and anger.

Fargeat's vision for how quickly Elisabeth's transformations should occur sparked debate with Persin and the lead makeup artist, Stéphanie Guillon. For the pre-substance scenes, Guillon felt that "[Moore's Elisabeth] had to be beautiful in the beginning ... before she has all the prosthetics", while Fargeat wanted her to appear flawed from the start. Similarly, Persin felt that pacing the changes more gradually would enhance their impact, explaining, "It'll be wild and insane eventually."

Fargeat described the dialogue-free scene where Moore removes her makeup in front of a mirror as "the most challenging" of the film. Fargeat was stressed on the day of the shoot because she knew she was creating the "emotional heart of the movie" where performance, rhythm and lighting had to be perfect. Fargeat felt if Moore and the crew could pull it off, it would be incredibly powerful. After the 11th take, Guillon intervened to stop filming for the day. "I took the remover pad and I squashed everything, and I said, 'I removed everything, that's over. You have already 11. You cannot have more because tomorrow she will have a red face.' Normally you don't do that! But it was too much because it was very hard on her skin."

Prosthetics application ranged between 45 minutes and 7 hours (Note: Sources differ on the exact number; for instance, Moore stated that she spent 6.5 to 9 hours in the chair, possibly including takedown time.) depending on character complexity, sometimes only leaving an hour or two for filming in a given day. For her nude scenes, Margaret Qualley was fitted with custom-made breast prostheses to portray an idealized image of beauty, reminiscent of Jessica Rabbit. Qualley humorously explained the process: "Unfortunately, there is no magic boob potion, so we had to glue those on ... [they endowed] me with the rack of a lifetime—just not my lifetime."

=== Birth of Sue ===
Early in production, without life casts or scans from the actresses, Persin created and filmed a 30 cm maquette of the back opening to send to Fargeat for her approval. This enabled him to begin work on the scene.

Persin initially believed the prosthetic designs in the bathroom would be visually enhanced by moody lighting, akin to The Howling or Dario Argento's films. However, he would learn this was not the case, as he explained: "At first, I asked Coralie, I said, in the bathroom, because lots of things happen in the bathroom, are we going to have a nice something a bit dark and with shadows and to hide a little bit of the silicone and all that. And she was like, yeah, yeah, yeah, yeah. Cut to the [bright] white tiles."

For the birthing scene, Persin used a combination of prosthetics on body doubles and puppetry, which relied on two faceless, hyper-realistic silicone dummies that took between one and one-and-a-half months to construct. The entire sequence was shot with practical effects, with the exception of the close up of the eye splitting. Shots of the back splitting were achieved with the dummies on a raised set, operated by 5–6 puppeteers below while Fargeat directed from under the set or nearby. For the stitching of the back, Persin alternated between a dummy and a prosthetic applied directly to the actresses' skin. Careful attention was paid to the realism of the skin: the pores and cellulite were meticulously crafted, while layers of various colors: reds, yellows, greens, blues, and ochres — were applied in a pointillist manner, as no single paint color can replicate a natural skin tone, according to Persin. One challenge was avoiding giving the skin a "too rubbery or too elastic" appearance, so the team designed a prosthetic with soft material, but stiffer wound edges to make the needle weaving through the skin appear more realistic. The spine scar and other prosthetics were applied to Moore, two stunt doubles and two body doubles."

=== The Finger ===
Prosthetics design for "The Finger"

Persin's first project began with the finger prosthetic. However, the first test looked extremely fake, reminiscent of "Mickey Mouse". Correcting it took a month and temporarily halted the development of other prosthetics until the finger met Persin's desired standard of a balanced appearance, ensuring it would not look bulkier than the natural ones. Achieving this required creating extremely thin prosthetics, and in total, all the prosthetics were redesigned twice. A prosthetic arm was used for the scene where Moore tries to wash her finger in the sink.

=== Requiem ===
Persin praised Moore's professionalism during the five- to six-hour prosthetic application for the "Requiem" stage, likening it to "going to the dentist for six hours." The crew were especially impressed when Moore decided to postpone filming one of her scenes until the next day after noticing that her prosthetics had deteriorated over several hours of earlier shots, as she felt it would be extremely disrespectful to their hard work.

Due to Moore being born with amblyopia in one eye, she requested the makeup team avoid working too closely around the eye. Persin assumed the makeup effects would be further altered digitally but later discovered this was not the case. Most of the Requiem sequence relied on applied prosthetics adhered directly to the skin, while a few shots, such as Elisabeth's leg in the shower, were fake body parts. For the scene with Elisabeth's stuck kneecap, a modified chair was used to conceal Moore's real legs while revealing prosthetic, mechanical ones crafted from silicone. To achieve the look of translucent skin, the team used thin, prosthetic appliances that allowed the veins and bones to show through.

=== Gollum ===
Moore's transformation into "Gollum" was more extensive, with layers of silicone prosthetics glued directly onto her body. Red and blue wool was embedded in the silicone to mimic the appearance of veins beneath the skin. Persin used silicone because it looked more natural and did not easily wrinkle during the filming of action scenes. When Elisabeth runs down the hallway, Moore was switched out for a thinner body double to match the idea of Gollum having a "spider-like" physicality.

A sophisticated fake head, capable of realistic bleeding, was created for the mirror-smashing scene. Qualley smashed the fake head against the mirror and Moore mimed the action later with her real head; the visual effects team seamlessly blended the two shots to depict the head-on-mirror impact and Moore's reaction.

=== Monstro Elisasue ===
Facial prosthetics and latex suit for "Monstro Elisasue"

The head is a little bit like a female Elephant Man [...] that was what Coralie wanted, the sensibility of The Elephant Man, the David Lynch movie. We spent lots of time designing Monstro with all the breasts and trying to balance everything. Is she fat enough? How many boobs? Maybe we should add a jaw here. Maybe we can [add a spine], because there's lots of spines in the story from the very beginning.

— Pierre-Olivier Persin

Despite disagreements over previous transformations, for "Monstro", Persin and Fargeat were in sync. Since there were time constraints (as the design for Monstro had not been finalized until after shooting began), Persin subcontracted the Monstro build to Dave and Lou Elsey of UK-based Igor Studios. The final design was created using five prosthetic heads (including a special head with a cavity that splits open to birth a breast attached to an umbilical cord), two full bodysuits, two partial bodysuits, and a mold of Moore's head. The suit was entirely practical, with the exception of Moore's screaming face, which was achieved using digital effects, using a photogrammetry scan of Moore's face by Clear Angle Studios.

Persin drew inspiration from Niki de Saint Phalle, a French sculptor known for her vibrant and curvaceous figures (especially her depictions of female dancers); artist Fernando Botero, whose sculptures often feature women with exaggerated proportions; and David Cronenberg's 1986 film The Fly.

During pre-production, Persin expressed concern about the plan to have Qualley wear the full suit, noting that only Qualley's eye would be visible. Fargeat ultimately had Qualley do close-up shots for Monstro, recognizing the importance of her performance. Persin later acknowledged that this decision was essential to making Monstro's scenes visibly impactful in the final film.

Qualley would later describe wearing the prosthetics as "torture", adding, "I had this awesome team of prosthetic artists that put it on me and took it off of me and got me through the day, making me laugh a couple of times while I was just on the brink of panic." "My problem was I had to cry while I had the monster costume on. At a certain point, you're just swimming—there's like a layer of tears and snot inside your prosthetics, and they're just trying to reglue it down." The prosthetics application for Qualley required six hours and was filmed over the course of eight days. According to Qualley, the prosthetics caused her face to break out with acne, taking over a year to heal and affecting the filming of her subsequent role in Kinds of Kindness. Shots of Sue walking down the palm-lined street were deliberately filmed at low angles to conceal the blemishes. To prevent overheating, the suit incorporated a cooling vest similar to that which racecar drivers use.

Fargeat personally donned the Monstro suit for the shots showing blood spraying from Monstro's point of view. She held the camera herself, without the headpiece, while wearing the suit, as her arm was inside the blood rig. Persin also put on the suit to operate a breast puppet, which required at least 10–15 takes and left his arm numb from holding it above his head for extended periods. The constant spraying of blood caused the latex to turn pink as it became saturated quickly. The suit required repainting, resewing, and drying after each day. For sanitary and hygiene purposes, the crew sprayed vodka inside the suit every night to kill bacteria and remove moisture.

Near the end of the film, the stunt performer had to be moved on a dolly, due to limited mobility of the suit. When the blood rig was first tested, the performer slipped and went rolling backward down the long blood-soaked hallway featured near the end of the film.

=== The Blob ===
Ending the film with "The Blob" featuring Moore's face, Fargeat aimed for a clear visual that would allow for full facial expressions. Persin and his team constructed and manually maneuvered a puppet blob for the scene, which was overlaid on Moore's face with visual effects. It was referred to as "Gremlin" in the shooting schedule, a nod to Stripe melting at the end of the 1984 film Gremlins.

== Release ==
The Substance was selected to compete for the Palme d'Or at the 2024 Cannes Film Festival, where it had its world premiere on May 19, 2024. The film received a standing ovation. It had its second premiere at the Sydney Film Festival on June 16, 2024, followed by other premieres including the Karlovy Vary International Film Festival, the Toronto International Film Festival, the Munich International Film Festival, the Odesa International Film Festival, the New Horizons Film Festival, and the Edinburgh International Film Festival.

Working Title's parent company, Universal Pictures, which originally signed on as the distributor through a deal with Working Title Films, stepped away from the project but remained credited as a copyright holder in the film's credits. Multiple sources told The Hollywood Reporter that the studio was "worried about the prospect of releasing the film." According to Fargeat, the film encountered significant challenges during post-production, including a contentious test screening attended by two unnamed male executives and one unnamed female representative from Universal. One male executive vehemently opposed the film and insisted on a recut, a demand deemed unfeasible due to Fargeat's contractual final cut privilege. This led to Universal breaking off their distribution deal with Fargeat. Although the female representative later expressed her support for the film privately to Fargeat, she felt unable to voice her opinion during the screening.

Prior to its Cannes debut, Mubi acquired worldwide rights to the film for $12.5–15 million, (Note: Sources differ between $12.5M (Deadline) and $15M (Matthew Belloni for The Town).) planning to distribute it theatrically in North America, United Kingdom, Ireland, Germany, Austria, Latin America, Benelux as well as holding rights for Turkey and India, with its sales company subsidiary The Match Factory handling worldwide sales. The Substance opened in theaters in the US, UK, Latin America, Germany, Canada, and Netherlands on September 20, 2024, as well as in Spain on October 11, 2024. Metropolitan Filmexport acquired French distribution rights from The Match Factory, and released the film on November 6, 2024.

Advertising and film distribution costs for The Substance were under $20M worldwide and in the single digits in the United States. The marketing used avant-garde imagery such as a chicken bone and shiny hot pink exercise leotard and was overseen by Fargeat. The only vestige of Moore was a one sheet showing her stitched up back. Despite this unconventional approach, the film spread on social media. Demi Moore's posts reached her 15M followers and contributed to a total online reach of 45M across platforms, as estimated by RelishMix (including 7.6M views on TikTok, 10.8M on Instagram, and millions of views for other fan made content).

The film returned to theaters in the United States on January 17, 2025, as part of its awards season campaign, a few days before the announcement of the nominees for the 97th Academy Awards on January 23.

=== Home media ===
The Substance was released on MUBI's streaming platform and VOD in selected markets on October 31, 2024. The film was released on DVD and Blu-ray on March 31, 2025, in the United Kingdom, and was released on 4K, DVD and Blu-ray on January 21, 2025, in the United States.

The soundtrack was released through Waxwork Records digitally on September 20, 2024, and as a vinyl LP in "Activator Fluorescent Green" for pre-order on that date.

== Reception ==
=== Box office ===
The Substance grossed $17.6 million in the United States and Canada, and $59.7 million in other territories, for a worldwide total reported between $77.3 and $82 million. (Note: Variety states $79.1 million.)

In the United States and Canada, The Substance was released alongside Transformers One and Never Let Go, and was projected to gross around $3 million from 1,949 theaters in its opening weekend. The film made $1.3 million on its first day, including $512,000 from Wednesday and Thursday night previews. It went on to debut to $3.2 million, finishing sixth at the box office. The film dropped only 39% the following weekend, grossing $1.8 million. The film has become Mubi's highest-grossing film, surpassing the $10 million gross of Priscilla (2023). Additionally, in its first week of PVOD release, it ranked #3 on iTunes and #6 on Fandango at Home.

=== Critical response ===
On the review aggregator website Rotten Tomatoes, 89% of 378 critics' reviews are positive, with an average rating of 8.1/10. The website's consensus reads: "Audaciously gross, wickedly clever, and possibly Demi Moore's finest hour, The Substance is a gasp-inducing feat from writer-director Coralie Fargeat." Metacritic, which uses a weighted average, assigned the film a score of 78 out of 100, based on 57 critics, indicating "generally favorable" reviews. On AlloCiné, the film received an average rating of 3.6 out of 5, based on 39 reviews, from French critics. Audiences polled by CinemaScore gave the film an average grade of "B" on an A+ to F scale, while those surveyed by PostTrak gave it an 80% overall positive score (including an average of 4 out of 5 stars), with 75% saying they would definitely recommend it.

Peter Bradshaw's four-star (out of five) review in The Guardian called it "a cheerfully silly and outrageously indulgent piece of gonzo body-horror comedy." David Ehrlich of IndieWire graded the film an A, calling it "an epic, audacious body horror masterpiece ... an instant classic. The most sickly entertaining theatrical experience of the year." Nicholas Barber of the BBC awarded the film four stars out of five, while singling out Moore's performance, writing: "Ripping into her best big-screen role in decades, Demi Moore is fearless in parodying her public image." Phil de Semlyen's five star (out of five) review in Time Out said it is "Moore who glues it all together, going full Isabelle Adjani-in-Possession in a vanity-free performance full of bruised ego, dawning horror and vulnerability."

Owen Gleiberman of Variety praised the film's director, writing: "Coralie Fargeat works with the flair of a grindhouse Kubrick in a weirdly fun, cathartically grotesque fusion of Dr. Jekyll and Mr. Hyde and Showgirls." Radhika Seth of Vogue called it an "audacious piece of filmmaking ... the most exciting release to have debuted on the Croisette so far" and that it was her "current pick to win the Palme d'Or." Damon Wise of Deadline said it is "a riotous, dreamlike horror-thriller that ends in a delirious symphony of blood, guts and otherwise undefinable viscera." Javier Ocaña of El País wrote that the film "is not that great", partly "because subtlety is not Fargeat's greatest virtue", but "mostly because the first 45 minutes seem like a covert remake" of John Frankenheimer's [superior] Seconds.

Filmmakers Ana Lily Amirpour, Edward Berger, Davy Chou, Kelly Fremon Craig, Robert Eggers, Adam Elliot, Hannah Fidell, Michael Gracey, Kitty Green, Laurel Parmet, Rich Peppiatt and Juel Taylor cited it as among their favorite films of 2024.

In March 2025, feminist art critic Jan Lisa Huttner honored Demi Moore at SWAN Day 2025 events in New York City and Chicago for her performances in The Substance and Ghost, the film which previously earned her a Golden Globe nomination in 1991. Writing for FF2 Media, Julia Lasker said:

Through Elisabeth’s transformation and its gruesome aftermath, [Fargeat] creates a powerful metaphor for the violence that the entertainment industry inflicts on women’s bodies and psyches, because they must fit impossible beauty standards in order to succeed. The Substance's unflinching examination of this history makes its recognition by AMPAS (the Academy of Motion Picture Arts & Sciences) both momentous and ironic — The Substance is being celebrated by the very institution it critiques.

In June 2025, IndieWire ranked the film at number 91 on its list of "The 100 Best Movies of the 2020s (So Far)." In July 2025, it was one of the films voted for the "Readers' Choice" edition of The New York Times' list of "The 100 Best Movies of the 21st Century," finishing at number 126.

=== Accolades ===
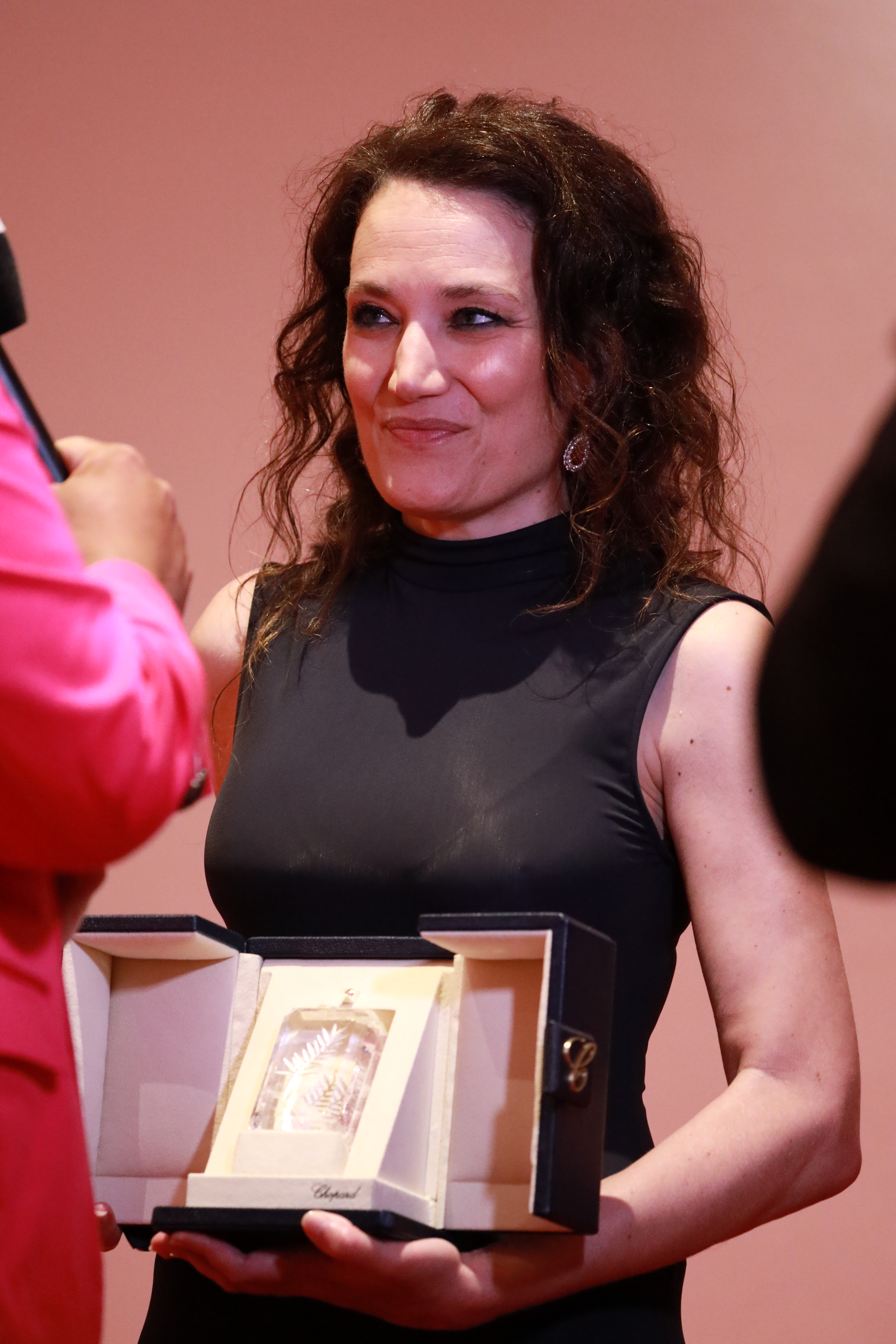
Fargeat holding the Best Screenplay award she received at the 77th Cannes Film Festival

The Substance has won a number of awards. At the 77th Cannes Film Festival, Fargeat won Best Screenplay. It competed for the Palme d'Or, losing to Anora. At the 32nd International Film Festival of the Art of Cinematography Camerimage, Director's Debuts Competition, Benjamin Kračun was nominated for cinematography. However, the film was pulled from competition by Fargeat due to negative comments about women in film by the festival director Marek Zydowicz.

At the 82nd Golden Globe Awards, the film received five nominations: Best Motion Picture – Musical or Comedy, Best Director for Fargeat, Best Actress in a Motion Picture – Musical or Comedy for Moore, Best Supporting Actress – Motion Picture for Qualley, and Best Screenplay for Fargeat; Moore won in her category. She additionally won Outstanding Performance by a Female Actor in a Leading Role in a Motion Picture at the 31st Screen Actors Guild Awards.

At the 97th Academy Awards, The Substance was nominated for five awards and won Best Makeup and Hairstyling. It was nominated for Best Picture, Best Original Screenplay and Best Director for Fargeat, and Best Actress for Moore. Fargeat became the first woman to be nominated for writing and directing a horror film, and the ninth woman to be nominated for directing overall in Academy Awards history. (Note: Multiple sources:)

== Themes and influences ==
Wendy Ide of The Guardian noted The Substance for its feminist perspective of older women, contrasting it with other female-led horror films like Carrie and Rosemary's Baby which centre on themes of menstruation and childbirth. She wrote that The Substance, in contrast, "not only offers a female perspective on women's bodies, but also argues that things only start to get properly messy once fertility is a dim memory." The New York Times critic Alissa Wilkinson described the film as an exploration of the male gaze, noting the satirically exaggerated camera angles and shots, depicting the female characters in a way "that feels reminiscent mostly of porn". In exaggerating these portrayals of female beauty standards to the point of absurdity, the film becomes humorous: "the worse things become for Elisabeth, the harder it is not to giggle with glee." She also notes that the film can be seen as exploring mind–body dualism.

Alison Willmore of Vulture said that the film's strongest theme is about the dangers of addiction, comparing it to Requiem for a Dream. Elisa Battistini for Scraps from the Loft (originally published on Quinlan.it) called the film "a strange blend of Death Becomes Her and Society with hints of Tetsuo". Several critics have noted the film's similarities to Oscar Wilde's 1890 novel The Picture of Dorian Gray. (Note: Multiple sources:)

The film's influences include works by David Cronenberg (The Fly), John Carpenter (The Thing), Joel and Ethan Coen (Barton Fink), David Lynch (Mulholland Drive), Darren Aronofsky (Requiem for a Dream), and Stanley Kubrick (2001: A Space Odyssey).
