= Milo (film) =

2026 French film by Nicole Garcia

- French: 7:40 ce matin-là
- Directed by: Nicole Garcia
- Screenplay by: Nicole Garcia; Jacques Fieschi; Laurette Polmanss; Olivier Demangel
- Produced by: Alain Attal
- Starring: Marion Cotillard; Théodore Pellerin; Artus; Laure Calamy; Charles Berling; Éric Elmosnino; Alexis Manenti; Anne Brochet
- Cinematography: Yves Cape
- Edited by: François Gédigier
- Music by: Amine Bouhafa
- Production companies: Les Productions du Trésor; France 3 Cinéma; StudioCanal
- Distributed by: StudioCanal
- Release dates: 24 September 2026 (SSIFF); 20 January 2027 (France)
- Running time: 114 minutes
- Country: France
- Language: French

Milo (French: 7:40 ce matin-là) is a 2026 French drama film directed by Nicole Garcia from a screenplay she co-wrote with Jacques Fieschi, Laurette Polmanss, and Olivier Demangel, starring Marion Cotillard, Théodore Pellerin, Artus, Laure Calamy, Charles Berling, Éric Elmosnino, Alexis Manenti, and Anne Brochet.

The film had its world premiere at the 74th San Sebastián International Film Festival on 24 September 2026, where it competed for the Golden Shell and won the SGAE Award for Best Music. It will be released theatrically in France by StudioCanal on 20 January 2027.

== Plot ==
After leaving prison, Alice starts working as a waitress in a small cafeteria next to an auto repair garage. She befriends a young man named Milo, who works at the garage. Alice's real reason for getting close to the young man is deeply personal: Milo is her son.

== Cast ==
- Marion Cotillard as Alice
- Théodore Pellerin as Milo
- Artus
- Laure Calamy
- Charles Berling
- Éric Elmosnino
- Alexis Manenti
- Anne Brochet

== Production ==
=== Development ===
On 12 September 2025, the French website Auvergne-Rhône-Alpes Cinéma announced that Nicole Garcia's upcoming 10th feature film, titled Milo, would be filmed in the region of Auvergne-Rhône-Alpes for 12 days between October and November 2025. Garcia co-wrote the screenplay with longtime collaborator Jacques Fieschi, marking their 10th collaboration, and also with Laurette Polmanss and Olivier Demangel. It also marks Garcia's fourth collaboration with producer Alain Attal after Charlie Says (2006), A View of Love (2010), and From the Land of the Moon (2016). The film is produced by Les Productions du Trésor in co-production with France 3 Cinéma and StudioCanal, the latter also financed the film.

In July 2026, the French title changed from Milo to 7:40 ce matin-là.

=== Casting ===
On 22 October 2025, Le Dauphiné libéré reported that Marion Cotillard and Artus will star in the film, marking Garcia's second collaboration with Cotillard 10 years after From the Land of the Moon (2016). Artus was cast after Garcia watched him in the film Block Pass (2024) and found his performance "extraordinarily good". On 28 October 2025, Le Dauphiné libéré reported that Théodore Pellerin, Laure Calamy, Charles Berling and Éric Elmosnino had joined the cast. On 24 November 2025, Screen International reported that Pellerin would play the title character and that Alexis Manenti and Anne Brochet had joined the cast.

In an interview with Deadline in February 2026, Garcia said about directing Cotillard for the second time in Milo:

The new role is diametrically opposed to the role of From the Land of the Moon. There was an emotional romanticism in that film, while here, on the contrary, it's a much quieter role, contained, and deeply felt. There's a silence filled with emotions and confessions that are difficult to express. You can sense her character has grown accustomed to the silence but is also grappling with it. It's a real balancing act and it takes a great actress to pull that off.

=== Filming ===
Principal photography started on 27 October 2025. Filming locations in southeastern France included Romans-sur-Isère, Bourg-de-Péage, and Marches, Drôme in Auvergne-Rhône-Alpes between 27 October and 14 November 2025, before moving to Paris for the last five weeks. Shooting wrapped in Paris on 4 December 2025.

== Release ==
The film made its world premiere in official competition at the 74th San Sebastián International Film Festival on 24 September 2026. StudioCanal will release the film theatrically in France on 20 January 2027 and handle international sales. The film will be released in Germany by StudioCanal, in Portugal by Lusomundo, in Canada by Mongrel Media, in Greece by Spenzos, in Scandinavia by Scanbox, in Switzerland by Frenetic, in Ex-Yugoslavia by MCF, and across the CIS by Capella.

== Reception ==
Jordan Mintzer of The Hollywood Reporter described the film as a "dark drama grounded in good performances".

== Accolades ==
Award / Film Festival	Date of ceremony	Category	Recipient(s)	Result	Ref.
San Sebastián International Film Festival	26 September 2026	Golden Shell	Nicole Garcia	Nominated	
San Sebastián International Film Festival	26 September 2026	SGAE Award for Best Music	Amine Bouhafa	Won	
