= Éric Elmosnino =

French actor and musician

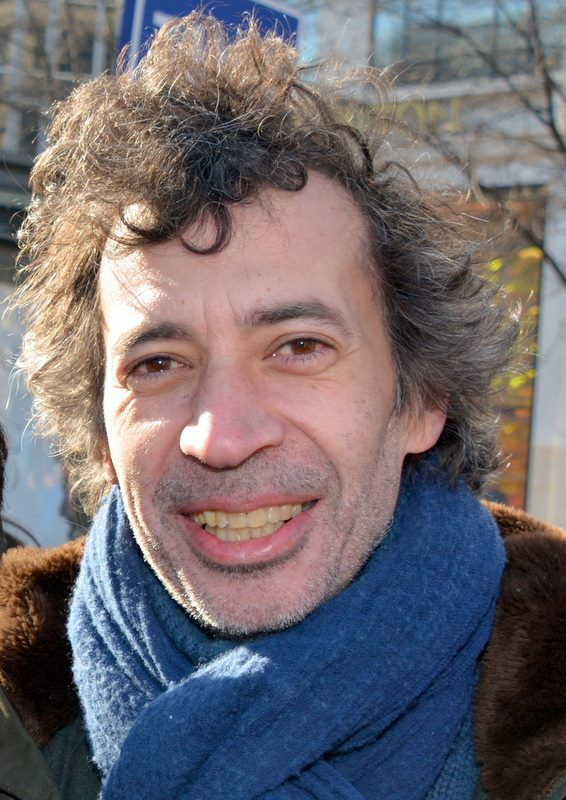
- Elmosnino in 2015
- Born: 2 May 1964 (age 61); Suresnes, Hauts-de-Seine, France
- Occupations: Actor; musician
- Years active: 1985–present

Éric Elmosnino (born 2 May 1964) is a French actor and musician. He is known internationally for portraying Serge Gainsbourg in Gainsbourg: A Heroic Life (2010), for which he won the César Award for Best Actor.

== Early life ==
Elmosnino was born in the Paris suburbs to a Sephardic Jewish (Moroccan-Jewish) father who was an industrial designer at Thomson-CSF, and to an Alsatian mother who left EDF to raise her children.

He studied at the National Conservatory of Dramatic Art. After leaving the Conservatory, he worked at the Théâtre Nanterre-Amandiers with Jean-Pierre Vincent.

== Career ==
In 1992, he played Christian Ribet, a friend of Guillaume de Tonquédec, in the film Tableau d'honneur (Honour Roll) by Charles Nemes.

In 2006, he played in the theater as Edward Bond, directed by Alain Francon, at the Avignon Festival and the Théâtre de la Colline in Paris. In January 2008, he performed in a show at the Theatre Antoine in Paris for Yasmina Reza's God of Carnage.

He portrayed Serge Gainsbourg in Gainsbourg: A Heroic Life (2010), for which he won the César Award for Best Actor.

In October 2025, Elmosnino joined the cast of Nicole Garcia's upcoming film Milo.

== Selected filmography ==
Key
†	Denotes film or TV productions that have not yet been released

Year	Title	Role	Director
1992	Tableau d'honneur	Christian Ribet	Charles Nemes
1994	Colonel Chabert	Desroches	Yves Angelo
1996	Bernie	the vendor	Albert Dupontel
1999	Late August, Early September	Thomas	Olivier Assayas
2007	Actrices	Raymond	Valeria Bruni Tedeschi
2007	La Vie d'artiste	Alice's ex	Marc Fitoussi
2008	Summer Hours	the police inspector	Olivier Assayas
2009	Park Benches	the sleeper	Bruno Podalydès
2009	Father of My Children	Serge	Mia Hansen-Love
2010	Gainsbourg: A Heroic Life	Serge Gainsbourg	Joann Sfar
2010	Le Skylab	Jean	Julie Delpy
2012	Télé gaucho	Jean-Lou	Michel Leclerc
2013	Ouf	François	Yann Coridian
2014	La Famille Bélier	M. Thomasson	Éric Lartigau
2015	Chic!	Julien Lefort	Jérôme Cornuau
2017	L'école buissonnière	Borel	Nicolas Vanier
2017	If I Were a Boy	Merlin	Audrey Dana
2018	I Feel Better	Laurent	Jean-Pierre Améris
TBA	Milo †	TBA	Nicole Garcia

== Awards and nominations ==
List of awards and nominations
Year	Title of work	Award	Category	Result
2011	Gainsbourg	Lumière Awards	Best Actor	Nominated
2011	Gainsbourg	Globes de Cristal Award	Best Actor	Nominated
2011	Gainsbourg	César Award	Best Actor	Won
2011	Gainsbourg	Cabourg Film Festival	Best Actor	Won
2011	Gainsbourg	Etoiles d'Or Award	Best Actor	Won
2011	Gainsbourg	Etoiles d'Or Award	Best Male Newcomer	Won
2015	La Famille Bélier	César Award	Best Supporting Actor	Nominated
