= Only the Animals (film) =

2019 film by Dominik Moll

- Film poster
- French: Seules les bêtes
- Directed by: Dominik Moll
- Written by: Dominik Moll; Gilles Marchand
- Based on: Seules les bêtes by Colin Niel
- Produced by: Simon Arnal; Caroline Benjo; Barbara Letellier; Carole Scotta
- Starring: Denis Ménochet; Laure Calamy
- Cinematography: Patrick Ghiringhelli
- Edited by: Laurent Rouan
- Music by: Benedikt Schiefer
- Distributed by: Haut et Court
- Release date: 28 August 2019 (Venice)
- Running time: 117 minutes
- Country: France
- Language: French
- Box office: $939,630

Only the Animals (French: Seules les bêtes) is a 2019 French crime drama film directed by Dominik Moll. It is based on the novel Seules les bêtes by Colin Niel.

== Plot ==
In a prologue, we see a young Ivorian man, Rolex, bicycling through Abidjan with a goat tied to his back. He enters an apartment building and asks for "Papa Sanou."

The scene shifts to the French Massif Central in midwinter, and the first chapter, "Alice." Alice Farange is an insurance agent making a visit to a sheep farm, where the owner, Joseph Bonnefille, lives alone. She greets him as he walks out of the woods. They go inside, do business, and then make love. Afterwards, Alice remarks that Joseph seems distracted. She returns home to the cattle farm where she lives with her husband, Michel, and her father. The TV warns of a blizzard and gives news of a missing woman, Evelyne Ducat, who lived with her husband in a country house nearby. The next day, a local policeman, Cedric Vigier, calls on the Faranges asking about the case, but they tell him nothing, even though Alice saw Evelyne's abandoned car on the way back from Joseph's. After Cedric leaves, Michel confronts Alice about her affair. When she calls on Joseph the next day, he is not at home. She enters the hay barn and finds his dog dead with a gunshot wound. Joseph appears and angrily tells her to leave. When Alice returns she sees Michel on the telephone, angrily saying he will not press charges. He refuses to explain and drives off, coming back with his nose bloody. Alice asks whether he fought with Joseph and killed his dog, but he is silent. The next day Michel disappears, leaving his empty car for Cedric and Alice to find.

The next chapter, "Joseph," opens with the farmer finding the body of Evelyne behind his farmhouse: the scene that Alice interrupted at the start of her chapter, and the reason for Joseph's discomfiture. He tries to dispose of the body farther away, but has second thoughts and brings it back to the farm. There he builds a maze of hay bales in the barn to hide the body. Over the next days, he begins to talk to Evelyne, plays her music, and spends nights with her in the hideaway. He hallucinates a living Evelyne, who forgives him for failing to report the recent death of his mother promptly, leaving the body to decompose. The dog's barking at Evelyne's body arouses the suspicion of Cedric on a visit. Later, when the dog finds and bites at Evelyne's body, Joseph shoots him. The scene in the barn with Alice repeats from Joseph's point of view, showing that he had just come out from Evelyne's hiding place. He decides that it is too risky to keep the corpse in the barn, and carries it to a deep and remote sinkhole, where he drops it in, then jumps after it to his death.

In a new chapter, "Marion," we see the title character, a young waitress in a seaside restaurant in Sète, flirting with Evelyne, who is dining alone. The two begin a passionate affair which continues in Evelyne's hotel. Evelyne tells Marion of her husband but suggests that he does not mind what she does. Eventually, Marion wakes up alone, and finds a note from Evelyne promising to see her when next in Sète. Marion has fallen in love, however, and hitchhikes into the mountains to seek Evelyne out at her country house. Michel, driving by with Alice, slows down to pick Marion up but suddenly speeds away when he sees her face. Marion finds Evelyne alone in the country house. Their passion resumes but Evelyne is uncomfortable at having her in this part of her life. She drives Marion to a hotel and offers to pay. Marion refuses, then finds the hotel beyond her own means and checks into a mobile home in a campsite. Marion still pursues Evelyne, who continues to put her at a distance, lying that her husband is coming home. Alone in the trailer, Marion is startled by someone spying on her. She later returns to find an envelope full of money. She calls Evelyne angrily; Evelyne comes to the mobile home and breaks off the affair, shouting and slapping the younger woman, then drives off. The next day, Cedric visits Marion and questions her. Afterwards, Michel shows up at the mobile home, behaving amorously and calling Marion "Amandine." She reacts in terror, screaming and giving Michel a bloody nose, and he flees.

The mystery of "Amandine" is explained in the final chapter. We return to Abidjan where young, unemployed Armand gossips with his friends about Rolex from the prologue, now seen driving up to a nightclub in high style, thanks to success in Internet scams aided by the sorcerer Papa Sanou. Armand decides to follow suit, and begins chatting with Michel online in the persona of Amandine, sending photographs of a young European woman who somewhat resembles Marion. After the scam begins, Armand gains an audience with Sanou. The sorcerer blesses the enterprise in a ritual, warning Armand to bring back money to him when he succeeds. "Amandine" extracts increasing amounts of money from Michel, and Armand makes his own extravagant nightclub debut. There he notices his ex-lover Monique and goes home with her. Monique is living as a white Frenchman's kept woman in a luxury villa, with her (and Armand's) daughter Flore. The Frenchman is away, and Armand rekindles the relationship, buying expensive gifts for Monique and Flore. The scam is jeopardized, though, when Michel starts telling "Amandine" that he has seen her close to home (the hitchhiking incident). Armand plays along, but has no idea how to follow up. He returns to Papa Sanou, who interprets this complication as a spiritual punishment for not sharing the proceeds, and demands 4000 Euros for the continued favor of the spirits. In a panic, Armand makes the extravagant demand of Michel. Michel has already tracked down Marion to the campsite, stalking her and leaving the cash that Marion thought came from Evelyne. He responds to Armand's latest request by returning to the campsite, where he spies on Evelyne's violent confrontation with Marion, and believes Armand's story that Amandine is being chased by underworld creditors. Taking Evelyne for one of these goons, he chases her down in the dark and strangles her, then leaves the body on Joseph's farm in revenge for the affair with Alice.

In Abidjan, Armand is picked up in a cybercrime raid. The Ivorian police call Michel and explain the scam to him, but he refuses to press charges (the phone call that Alice walked in on in the first chapter). We see Michel's confrontation with Marion again, and the scene with Alice asking about his bloody nose. Consumed by guilt, Michel departs for Abidjan, where Armand now has an honest if humble job with his uncle. Monique shows up to tell Armand she is moving to France with her benefactor, and tries to give him back an expensive necklace he gave her in better days. Michel tracks down Armand and confronts him, but without much satisfaction. Back in his hotel, Michel laughs bitterly as another internet scammer tries to get his attention. Finally, it is revealed that Monique's "white man" was none other than Evelyne's husband Guillaume, as Monique arrives at the fateful country house with Flore and looks around the unfamiliar, snowy landscape.

== Cast ==
- Denis Ménochet as Michel
- Laure Calamy as Alice
- Damien Bonnard as Joseph
- Nadia Tereszkiewicz as Marion
- Bastien Bouillon as Cédric Vigier
- Valeria Bruni Tedeschi as Evelyne Ducat
- Jenny Bellay as Madame Calvet
- Guy Roger N'Drin as Armand
- Marie Victoire Amie as Monique

== Reception ==
On review aggregator website Rotten Tomatoes, the film has an approval rating of 93% based on 58 critics, with an average rating of 7.5/10. The site's consensus states: "Deft direction and an expertly assembled ensemble further elevate Only the Animals' intelligent, absorbing mystery." On Metacritic, Only the Animals has a score of 69 out of a 100 based on 13 critics, indicating "generally favorable reviews".

Peter Bradshaw of The Guardian wrote "The film's constituent parts... interlock like the workings of an intricate and malign musical box, creating dashes of melodrama, erotic obsession and even soap opera, and all superbly performed". Wendy Ide of The Observer commented "This is film-making that really tests the elasticity of its story strands, but it largely manages to keep the audience from teetering into disbelief".

In Australia, the film was lauded by David Stratton of The Australian who praised the director, the "excellent cast" and the film's "intricately devised characters". Paul Byrnes of The Sydney Morning Herald called the film "impressively deliberate and sober in style".

In the UK, Tom Robey of The Daily Telegraph wrote "An ingenious feat of narrative construction which leads us down the garden path then backtracks up it bit by bit". Across the border, in Ireland, Donald Clarke, a film critic for The Irish Times wrote "Jolts are not severe enough to derail a smooth-running machine, but you may like to take a few Dramamine before the last act begins".

In the United States, Robert Abele of the Los Angeles Times commented "Not an entirely humming machine, but one that's been well-oiled enough to make for an engrossing ride through some intriguing thickets of love, desire and deceit".

Manohla Dargis of The New York Times wrote "The multiple viewpoints are just a clever, self-satisfied device to deliver stale goods and familiar ugliness with a soupçon of glib class politics".

Mark Keizer of Variety said the film "doesn't ask you to keep up so much as it encourages you to sink into the mystery and go along for the ride". Jordan Mintzer of The Hollywood Reporter added that "[it] can be a bit low on suspense in [some] places, but [the film] remains intriguing enough to keep you guessing till the [very end]".
