= Reality+ =

2014 short film by Coralie Fargeat

- Directed by: Coralie Fargeat
- Written by: Coralie Fargeat
- Produced by: Jérôme Lateur
- Starring: Vanessa Hessler; Vincent Colombe; Aurélien Muller; Aurélia Poirier; Samuel Trépanier
- Cinematography: Philip Lozano
- Edited by: Charlotte Rembauville
- Music by: Walt Fermaitre
- Production company: Mezzanine
- Release date: 2014
- Running time: 22 minutes
- Country: France
- Language: French

Reality+ is a 2014 French science fiction short film written and directed by Coralie Fargeat. It explores a version of Paris in the near future in which a brain implant called Reality+ allows users to see themselves with their ideal physique.

Based on themes including society's obsession with appearance, Reality+ was funded through the Audi Talents Awards. Fargeat used the limited budget to blend futuristic elements with the historic setting of Paris. The film received accolades and served as inspiration for Fargeat's critically acclaimed film The Substance (2024).

== Synopsis ==
In Paris at some point during the near future, Vincent is unhappy with his appearance and installs Reality+, a brain implant that lets users see themselves and others with their dream physique. Those with Reality+ see themselves as models, while those without must settle for a less ideal reality. However, Reality+ only works in 12-hour intervals, which poses a challenge for Vincent as he navigates an appearance-obsessed world and falls for fellow Reality+ user Stella.

== Cast ==
- Vanessa Hessler as Stella+
- Vincent Colombe as Vincent Dangeville
- Aurélien Muller as Vincent+
- Aurélia Poirier as La Voisine / Stella
- Samuel Trépanier as Hervé

== Production and release ==
The film was written and directed by Coralie Fargeat, produced by Jérôme Lateur, and shot in France. Fargeat was one of the recipients of the 2013 Audi Talents Awards, a cultural sponsorship program that funded the film. Her concept for the film stemmed from media stories she had seen about people willing to suffer and risk their lives for the unattainable promise of happiness, such as Russian girls undergoing hundreds of operations to resemble a Barbie doll or Chinese girls enduring painful and dangerous leg-lengthening surgery. A fan of science fiction, she drew inspiration from the works of Philip K. Dick and the films Total Recall (1990), Gattaca (1997), and Existenz (1999). She felt that science fiction was rarely explored in French cinema, which Audi Talents juror Nicolas Altmayer ascribed to a lack of resources.

When casting the "plus" version of each character, Fargeat sought actors with an "unnervingly similar and unnaturally perfect" appearance, aiming to make them feel distinctly detached from reality. For the true-to-life characters, she sought the opposite and thus looked for actors with imperfections to create empathy and charm. Italian-American actress Vanessa Hessler was working in New York City when she met Fargeat over Skype. She liked the script and the film's message that "appearance isn't everything in life".

Fargeat felt it was crucial to establish the film's worldbuilding to ensure its credibility, believing that the entire film would fall apart if the worldbuilding failed. Working with a limited budget, she could not showcase elements like futuristic cars, but conveyed the setting in other ways. She depicted a futuristic city growing within the historic version of Paris and added technological interfaces, fingerprint scans for payments, and other elements that might become commonplace within the next two decades. She aimed to present Vincent's apartment as a claustrophobic space, drawing inspiration from the work of Erwin Olaf and Gregory Crewdson. She also used dark colors and sound design to enhance this idea.

The film features over 90 visual effects shots. The nightclub scene featured 50 extras, with multiple takes combined to create the illusion of between 300 and 400 people in the club. For the scenes where Reality+ is activated in front of the mirror, actors were filmed in front of a green screen, with the background recreated in 3D based on a photographed real bathroom. Camera movements were tracked with the actors' reflections via match moving to ensure a perfect match. Cinematographer Philippe Lozano used a head-mounted camera to capture the moment when the chip begins to malfunction.

Fargeat expressed interest in adapting Reality+ into an episode of the British dystopian science fiction series Black Mirror (2011–present). The film was later licensed to Wired, and would go on to inspire Fargeat's critically acclaimed film The Substance (2024).

== Accolades ==
Award/Selection	Festival	Location	Date	Result
Audience Favorite	Palm Springs International Festival of Short Films	USA	June 2015	Won
Audience Award	Sapporo Short Fest	Japan	October 2015	Won
International Audience Award	Shnit International Festival	Bern	October 2015	Won
Best Movie	Festival International du Film Court Paul Simon	France	June 2015	Won
Jury Award	Festival des Films Européens de Mamers	France	March 2015	Won
Audience Award	Festival Cellul'art	Germany	April 2015	Won
European Award	Festival Corti da Sogni	Italy	May 2015	Won
Jury Award Best Director	All Shorts Irving Film Festival (AsiFF)	USA	May 2016	Won
Jury Award Best Cinematographer	All Shorts Irving Film Festival (AsiFF)	USA	May 2016	Won
Tribeca Film Festival (Competition)	Tribeca Film Festival	USA	April 2016	In competition
Cleveland Film Festival (Competition)	Cleveland International Film Festival	USA	April 2016	In competition
Newport Beach Film Festival (Competition)	Newport Beach Film Festival	USA	April 2016	In competition
Mexico Short (Competition)	Shorts México	Mexico	September 2015	In competition
Odense Film Festival (Competition)	Odense International Film Festival	Denmark	August 2015	In competition
Cinema Jove Film Festival (Competition)	Cinema Jove Film Festival	Spain	June 2015	In competition
MEDIAWAVE (Competition)	Mediawave International Film Festival	Hungary	May 2015	In competition
RIFF – Rome Independent Film Festival (Competition)	Rome Independent Film Festival	Italy	May 2015	In competition
Festival International du Film d'Alès – Itinérances (Competition)	Alès Film Festival	France	April 2015	In competition

== See also ==
- Cinema of France
- Videodrome - similar in content
- Body horror
