= Coralie Fargeat =

French filmmaker (born 1976)

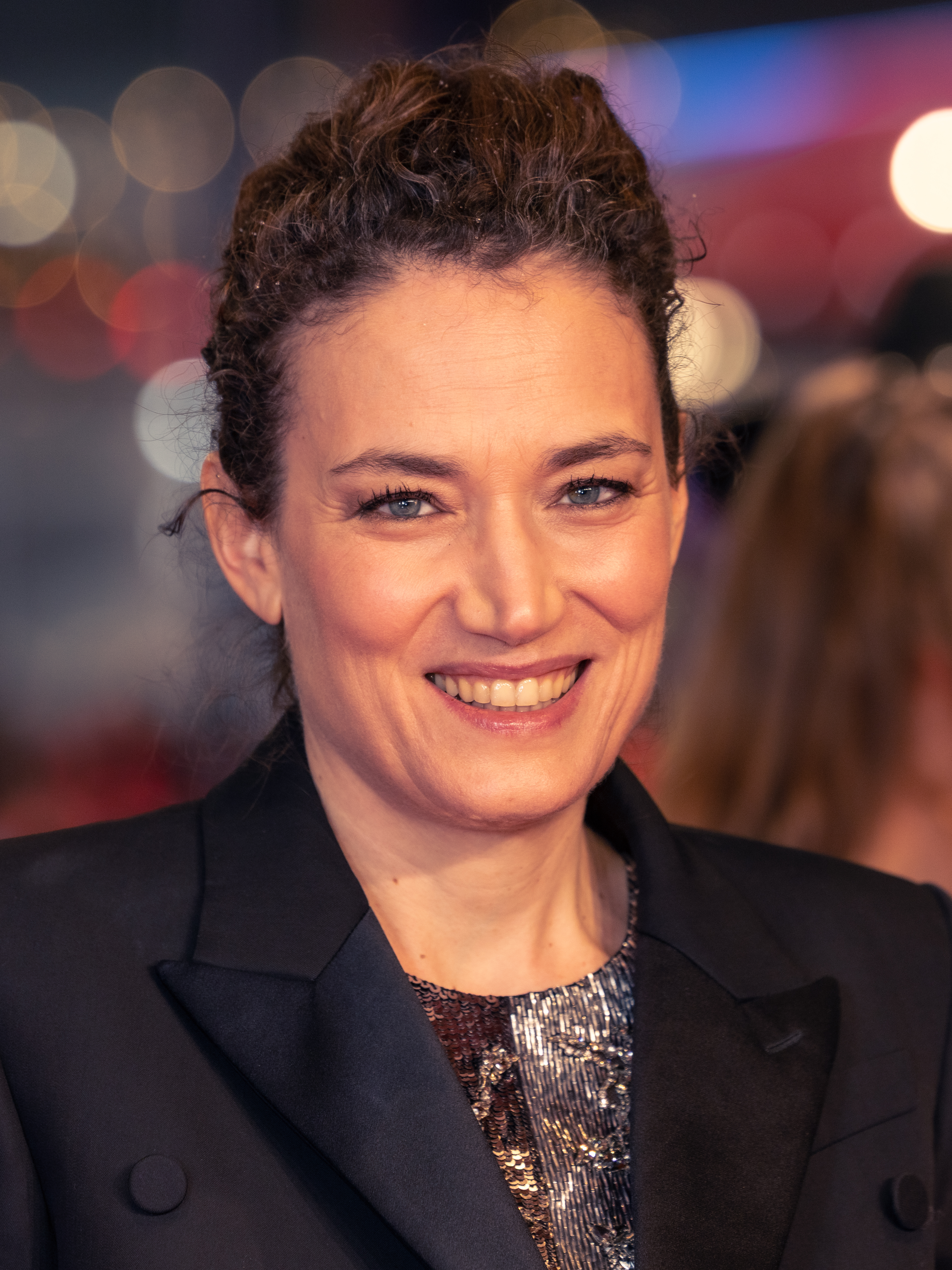
- Fargeat in 2025
- Born: 24 November 1976 (age 49); Paris, France
- Occupations: Director; screenwriter; producer
- Years active: 2003–present
- Notable work: Revenge; The Substance

Coralie Fargeat (French: [kɔʁali faʁʒa]; born 24 November 1976) is a French filmmaker. She gained recognition with her debut feature film, Revenge (2017), for which she received awards from several independent film festivals. Her follow-up feature, The Substance (2024), a satirical body horror film, earned her the Cannes Film Festival Award for Best Screenplay as well as three Academy Award nominations for Best Picture, Best Director, and Best Original Screenplay.

== Early life ==
Fargeat was born and raised in Paris. She decided to be a filmmaker when she was 16 or 17 years old. Fargeat studied at Sciences Po before beginning work on film sets. In 2010, Fargeat attended La Fémis, a prestigious cinema school in Paris. She was selected to be in its Atelier Scénario, a year-long screenwriting workshop. In an interview with Seventh Row, she said: "...I first arrived with a project that was completely genre. It was about a woman who thinks that she’s being chased and attacked by insects, and she goes crazy. When I came to the workshop with that idea, everyone looked at me like I was an alien! It’s not at all the kind of projects that are usually read and developed there."

While attending La Fémis, Fargeat and a group of her director friends created a collective called La Squadra, where they all tried to edit their features together, facing similar difficulties as they each wanted to create genre films. They met twice a week and invited filmmakers and industry professionals to share their success stories with them, which helped them to gain a more realistic understanding of the film world, how it works, and the logistics of how to get their stories told.

== Career ==
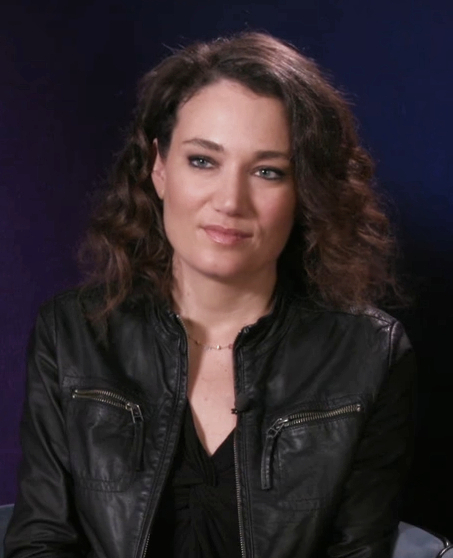
Fargeat in 2018

Fargeat's first short film Le télégramme was released in 2003, a film about two women awaiting a postman's delivery during World War II. The film won 13 awards at several film festivals.

In 2007, Fargeat co-created Les Fées cloches [fr] with Anne-Elisabeth Blateau, a comedy mini-series which she also directed.

Fargeat released her short follow-up Reality+ in 2014. The sci-fi tale received a nomination for the Jury Award at the Tribeca Film Festival.

In 2017, Fargeat directed Revenge, a revenge thriller about a young woman who is raped and left for dead. Inspired by other revenge movies such as Kill Bill, Rambo, and Mad Max, Fargeat was interested in exploring a character who would seem "weak" to others and the audience, but during the film would undergo a transformation into a "kind of superhero" that would set out to get her revenge. The film had its world premiere at the 2017 Toronto International Film Festival in the festival's Midnight Madness section, and was selected to be screened at 23 additional film festivals. Moreover, the release and success of Revenge was the long needed stimulus for once again discussing the lack of diversity in horror filmmaking, and filmmaking as a whole. Fargeat herself encouraged conversations regarding this topic, opening up about her long desire to challenge the male perspective in the film industry.

In 2022, Fargeat directed an episode of the Netflix series The Sandman, "Chapter 9: Collectors." In this episode, Fargeat’s style is very evident through her distinct color palette, emphasis on atmospheric elements, and focus on the grotesque. For example, in Revenge and The Substance (2024), Fargeat implements an eye-catching neon color palette which carries over into The Sandman. With Revenge and The Substance containing deep reds, cold blues, and contrasting blacks and whites to convey emotions and feelings. The Sandman falls directly into this color palette as well. Also, Fargeat did not rely on dialogue in The Sandman in the same way she did not in Revenge and The Substance, whereas she instead directed emphasis on the atmospheric and visual storytelling aspects. This creates a tension that would otherwise not be as strongly felt within the viewers. Her focus on the grotesque elements are an important aspect of the stories she tells. While The Sandman was nowhere near as graphic as her feature films such as Revenge or The Substance, her thematic interest in the darker and more grotesque aspects of human nature are clearly reflected in the portrayal of the “collectors” and their unsettling motivations.

Fargeat's second feature film was The Substance (2024), a body horror film starring Demi Moore, Margaret Qualley, and Dennis Quaid. The film premiered in competition at the 2024 Cannes Film Festival to a positive reception, with a 13-minute ovation. Fargeat went on to win the festival's Best Screenplay award for the film. The film went on to be nominated for five Academy Awards, including Best Picture, Best Director, and Best Original Screenplay. For her performance, Demi Moore was nominated for the Academy Award for Best Actress, and won the Golden Globe Award for Best Actress in a Motion Picture – Musical or Comedy,.

Beginning with the success of The Substance at the Cannes Film Festival in May 2024, the Brooklyn-based FF2 Media team began tracking the growing buzz. On March 29, 2025, feminist art critic and editor in chief of FF2 Media Jan Lisa Huttner coordinated two International SWANs events (one in Manhattan and one in Chicago) in celebration of SWAN Day 2025.

FF2 Content Editor Julia Lasker provided the intro to the career of filmmaker Coralie Fargeat at the SWAN Day 2025 celebration in Manhattan:

Coralie Fargeat has made Oscar history with her film The Substance this year, earning nominations for Best Picture, Best Actress, Best Director, Best Original Screenplay and Best Make Up/Hairstyling... This marks a tremendous achievement for Coralie, who first caught critics’ attention with her 2017 feminist body horror thriller Revenge… The Substance, Coralie’s sophomore feature, is also a bold and unnerving body horror film, but it also triumphs as a scathing critique of Hollywood’s treatment of aging actresses...

Coralie’s FIVE nominations are particularly significant insofar as they recognize a film that explicitly confronts Hollywood’s deeply ingrained ageism and misogyny. Through Elisabeth’s transformation and its gruesome aftermath, Coralie creates a powerful metaphor for the violence that the entertainment industry inflicts on women’s bodies and psyches, because they must fit impossible beauty standards in order to succeed. The Substance's unflinching examination of this history makes its recognition by AMPAS (the Academy of Motion Picture Arts & Sciences) both momentous and ironic -- The Substance is being celebrated by the very institution it critiques.

Meanwhile, Rebecca Martin, managing editor of the Chicago-based Cinema Femme magazine provided the intro to Fargeat's career at the parallel SWAN Day 2025 celebration in Chicago.

In June 2025, Fargeat was invited to join the Academy of Motion Picture Arts and Sciences.

Fargeat is a member and one of the founding signatories of Collectif 50/50, a French organization by French film directors Céline Sciamma and Rebecca Zlotowski. The Collectif 50/50 was first known as the Le Deuxième Regard back when it was first established in 2013 before becoming known as the Collectif 5050x2020 in 2018 following the Harvey Weinstein sexual abuse case that same year. Being created by film and audiovisual professionals, the Collectif 50/50 took its first action at the Cannes Film Festival by calling together 82 women directors from the film industry on the red carpet. The Collectif 50/50 is committed to working towards implementing greater gender equality and diversity throughout the male dominated field. Collectif 50/50 creates studies, puts plans of action into development, constructs tools and offers a wide variety of incentives to higher ups and actors/actresses in the industry with the goal of advancing positive change within the industry.

== Filmmaking style and influences ==
Fargeat is fascinated with the suspension of disbelief, and is a fan of using imagery and symbols to express something simple in a powerful way. She is fascinated with films that are able to create their own world and manage to exist outside the realm of reality, citing revenge films like Kill Bill and Rambo as examples of this.

In making graphic or gore-filled movies, Fargeat finds that balancing violent scenes with humor makes the violence more tolerable.

Fargeat believes that films that fill themselves with homages and references can push the viewer away from being able to identify with the film. She describes this separation as "second-degree moments" and chooses to stay away from excessive references. Fargeat finds it crucial to approach film and filmmaking with a genuine and sincere vision, stating she tries to "embrace [her] subject in its choices, its biases, its excesses, in its faults too" to achieve this.

When in pre-production for Revenge, she stated that actress Matilda Lutz was chosen for the part partially because of her extensive trust in Fargeat, something that was important to her for the creation of the film.

Fargeat lists David Cronenberg, John Carpenter, David Lynch, Paul Verhoeven, and Michael Haneke as filmmakers who have influenced her, as well as crediting several South Korean filmmakers as stylistic inspiration.

== Filmography ==
Feature film

Year	Title	Director	Writer	Producer	Editor
2017	Revenge	Yes	Yes	No	Yes
2024	The Substance	Yes	Yes	Yes	Yes

Short film

Year	Title	Director	Writer
2003	Le télégramme	Yes	Yes
2014	Reality+	Yes	Yes

Television

Year	Title	Notes	Ref.
2008–2014	Les Fées Cloches	Co-creator and starred as Pata	
2022	The Sandman	Episode: "Collectors"	

== Awards and nominations ==
Award	Year	Category	Work	Result	Ref.
Festival International du Film d'Amiens	2004	Prix des enfants de la Licorne	Le télégramme	Won	
Fajr International Film Festival	2005	International Competition – Best Short Narrative Film	Le télégramme	Won	
Corti Da Sogni Antonio Ricci International Short Film Festival	2015	European Sogni Award	Reality+	Won	
Tribeca Festival	2016	Jury Award for Best Narrative Short	Reality+	Nominated	
Sitges Film Festival	2017	Best Director	Revenge	Won	
Sitges Film Festival	2017	Citizen Kane Award for Best New Director	Revenge	Won	
Monster Fest	2017	Best International Feature	Revenge	Won	
Bucheon International Fantastic Film Festival	2018	Best of Bucheon Award	Revenge	Won	
Calgary Underground Film Festival	2018	Jury Award for Best Narrative Feature	Revenge	Won	
Cleveland International Film Festival	2018	New Direction Competition	Revenge	Nominated	
Cleveland International Film Festival	2018	ReelWomenDirect Award for Excellence in Directing by a Woman	Revenge	Nominated	
Fangoria Chainsaw Awards	2019	Best Director	Revenge	Nominated	
Fangoria Chainsaw Awards	2019	Best Limited Feature	Revenge	Nominated	
Cannes Film Festival	2024	Palme d'Or	The Substance	Nominated	
Cannes Film Festival	2024	Best Screenplay	The Substance	Won	
Toronto International Film Festival	2024	People's Choice Award: Midnight Madness	The Substance	Won	
European Film Awards	2024	European Film	The Substance	Nominated	
European Film Awards	2024	European Screenwriter	The Substance	Nominated	
San Diego Film Critics Society	2024	Best Director	The Substance	Nominated	
San Diego Film Critics Society	2024	Best Original Screenplay	The Substance	Nominated	
Seattle Film Critics Society	2024	Best Picture	The Substance	Nominated	
Seattle Film Critics Society	2024	Best Director	The Substance	Nominated	
Seattle Film Critics Society	2024	Best Screenplay	The Substance	Nominated	
Seattle Film Critics Society	2024	Best Editing	The Substance	Nominated	
Chicago Film Critics Association	2024	Best Director	The Substance	Nominated	
Chicago Film Critics Association	2024	Best Original Screenplay	The Substance	Nominated	
Golden Globe Awards	2025	Best Director – Motion Picture	The Substance	Nominated	
Golden Globe Awards	2025	Best Screenplay – Motion Picture	The Substance	Nominated	
Golden Globe Awards	2025	Best Motion Picture – Musical or Comedy	The Substance	Nominated	
Critics' Choice Movie Awards	2025	Best Director	The Substance	Nominated	
Critics' Choice Movie Awards	2025	Best Original Screenplay	The Substance	Won	
London Film Critics' Circle	2025	Director of the Year	The Substance	Nominated	
London Film Critics' Circle	2025	Screenwriter of the Year	The Substance	Nominated	
Satellite Awards	2025	Best Original Screenplay	The Substance	Nominated	
Independent Spirit Awards	2025	Best Feature	The Substance	Nominated	
Dorian Awards	2025	Film of the Year	The Substance	Won	
Dorian Awards	2025	Director of the Year	The Substance	Won	
Dorian Awards	2025	Genre Film of the Year	The Substance	Won	
Dorian Awards	2025	Campiest Flick	The Substance	Won	
Dorian Awards	2025	Screenplay of the Year	The Substance	Nominated	
Dorian Awards	2025	Wilde Artist Award	The Substance	Nominated	
Santa Barbara International Film Festival	2025	Outstanding Director of the Year	The Substance	Honored	
César Awards	2025	Best Foreign Film	The Substance	Nominated	
British Academy Film Awards	2025	Best Direction	The Substance	Nominated	
British Academy Film Awards	2025	Best Original Screenplay	The Substance	Nominated	
Academy Awards	2025	Best Picture	The Substance	Nominated	
Academy Awards	2025	Best Director	The Substance	Nominated	
Academy Awards	2025	Best Original Screenplay	The Substance	Nominated	

== Works cited ==
- "Coralie Fargeat Essay". Cut-Throat Women.
- Crucchiola, Jordan, Fargeat, Coralie (2020-04-17). "A French Director Fears Parisians Aren't Taking the Coronavirus Seriously". Vulture.
- Posada, Tim. "Male Hysteria and the New Final Girl in 2018's Revenge". Performing Hysteria (2020): 189–203.
- "Director Coralie Fargeat Talks Obsession, Inspirations, and 'Revenge'". Film School Rejects. 2018-09-18.
- Fleming, Amy (2018-05-10). "'Revenge' director Coralie Fargeat on her gory riposte to the male gaze". Financial Times.
- "Rencontre avec Coralie Fargeat, la réalisatrice du très énervé Revenge". EcranLarge.com (in French). 2018-02-11.
