= My Donkey, My Lover & I =

- Film poster
- French: Antoinette dans les Cévennes
- Directed by: Caroline Vignal
- Written by: Caroline Vignal
- Based on: Travels with a Donkey in the Cévennes by Robert Louis Stevenson
- Produced by: Laetitia Galitzine; Aurélie Rouvière
- Starring: Laure Calamy
- Cinematography: Simon Beaufils
- Edited by: Annette Dutertre
- Production companies: Chapka Films; La Filmerie
- Distributed by: Diaphana Films
- Release date: 16 September 2020 (France)
- Running time: 97 minutes
- Countries: France; Belgium
- Language: French
- Box office: $8 million

My Donkey, My Lover & I (French: Antoinette dans les Cévennes) is a 2020 French comedy film directed by Caroline Vignal and starring Laure Calamy.

== Cast ==
- Laure Calamy as Antoinette Lapouge
- Benjamin Lavernhe as Vladimir Loubier
- Olivia Côte as Eléonore Loubier
- Marc Fraize as Michel
- Jean-Pierre Martins as Shérif

== Production ==
Principal photography began on 11 June 2019 and took place in the Cévennes and the Île-de-France region. The seven-week shoot lasted until 31 July 2019. The film was shot largely in the Lozère department, with locations including the Mont Lozère and its Sommet de Finiels, the Roc du Couillou, the Col du Sapet as well as the village of Le Pont-de-Montvert. Antoinette ends her journey in the small town of Florac, in the heart of the Cévennes.

== Reception ==
On Rotten Tomatoes, My Donkey, My Lover & I holds an approval rating of 89% based on 46 critic reviews, with an average rating of 7/10. The critics consensus reads: "Charming performances from Laure Calamy and her four-legged co-star help make My Donkey, My Lover & I a familiar yet breezily enjoyable journey of self-discovery." Metacritic assigned the film a weighted average score of 72 out of 100, based on 12 critics, indicating "generally favorable reviews".
