= Her Way (film) =

2021 French film

- Directed by: Cécile Ducrocq
- Starring: Laure Calamy
- Release date: 6 September 2021 (DAFF)
- Running time: 97 minutes
- Country: France
- Language: French

Her Way (French: Une femme du monde) is a 2021 French drama film directed by Cécile Ducrocq.

== Cast ==
- Laure Calamy - Marie
- Nissim Renard - Adrien
- Béatrice Facquer - Camille

== Production ==
Filming mostly took place in Mulhouse, but also in Rixheim and Strasbourg.
