= Revenge (2017 film) =

Film by Coralie Fargeat

- Theatrical release poster
- Directed by: Coralie Fargeat
- Written by: Coralie Fargeat
- Produced by: Marc-Etienne Schwartz; Marc Stanimirovic; Jean-Yves Robin
- Starring: Matilda Lutz; Kevin Janssens; Vincent Colombe; Guillaume Bouchède
- Cinematography: Robrecht Heyvaert
- Edited by: Coralie Fargeat; Bruno Safar; Jérôme Eltabet
- Music by: ROB
- Production companies: Charades; MES Productions; Monkey Pack Films; Logical Pictures; Nexus Factory; Umedia; uFund; Canal+; Ciné+; Cinémage 12
- Distributed by: Rezo Films
- Release dates: 11 September 2017 (TIFF); 7 February 2018 (France)
- Running time: 108 minutes
- Country: France
- Languages: French; English
- Budget: $2.9–3 million
- Box office: $1.4 million

Revenge is a 2017 French action-thriller film written and directed by Coralie Fargeat in her feature directorial debut, and starring Matilda Lutz, Kevin Janssens, Vincent Colombe, and Guillaume Bouchède. The plot follows a young woman who is raped and left for dead in the desert by three men, where she recovers and seeks vengeance upon them.

Revenge had its world premiere on 11 September 2017 at the 42nd Toronto International Film Festival, as part of the Midnight Madness section. The film was released theatrically in France on 7 February 2018 by Rezo Films and received acclaim from critics.

== Plot ==
Jen and her married boyfriend, Richard, take a chartered helicopter to his secluded luxury vacation home in the desert. The pilot gives Richard a small bag of peyote. Jen is a young, beautiful American who wants to move to Los Angeles to pursue her dreams and believes Richard can help her. They sleep together, and afterwards, he calls his wife to check in. The next morning, Richard's friends Stan and Dimitri arrive early to take part in a hunting trip. Richard is forced to introduce Jen to them though he planned for her to leave before they arrived. That night, the four of them party. Jen asks to take the peyote but Richard declines, citing an anecdote he heard about a man who took peyote and sawed off his own leg without feeling it. Inebriated, Jen dances a sexy routine. When an exhausted Richard declines to join her, she dances seductively with Stan instead.

Jen awakes to Richard being away for the morning. Stan becomes aggressive when she rebuffs his advances and eventually rapes her. Dimitri sees the rape but ignores it. Richard returns and berates Stan, but when Jen asks to go home, he insists that she move to Canada at his expense. When Jen threatens to reveal their relationship to Richard's wife, Richard slaps her, and she runs off into the desert, pursued by the three men. Richard then shoves her off a cliff, and she is impaled by a tree branch. Believing Jen to be dead, Richard assures his friends that they can finish their trip before anyone finds the body.

Jen regains consciousness and, while bleeding, is able to painfully free herself but with a piece of the tree branch still stuck through her torso. When the men return, she hides. With night approaching, they split up to cover more ground. Jen catches Dimitri alone, but he grabs her face and holds her underwater. She grabs his hunting knife and stabs him in the eye. With Dimitri dead, Jen takes his shotgun and hides in a cave. She remembers she has Richard's peyote and takes it, before entering a heightened state of mind when she removes the branch and heats a beer can in the fire to cauterize the wound. The artwork on the can leaves a perfect brand/scar of a phoenix on her belly. After a series of nightmares of the men hunting her, Jen leaves the cave to deal with them.

The next morning, Richard and Stan find Dimitri's body. Stan takes the SUV to continue the hunt, but while he is filling the gas tank, Jen ambushes him. A bloody gunfight follows, and Stan is shot and killed by Jen while trying to run her over.

After failing to contact Stan on the radio, Richard speeds back home and calls a helicopter to pick him up. While showering, he hears a noise. Jen surprises him and manages to shoot him in the stomach. The two chase each other around the house with shotguns as Richard's blood covers every floor and wall. Despite his blood loss, Richard is able to catch Jen and begins strangling her, but Jen forces her hand into his exposed stomach, allowing her to retake the gun and ultimately shoot Richard dead. A bloodied but triumphant Jen walks out of the house as she hears the helicopter approach.

== Cast ==
- Matilda Lutz as Jen
- Kevin Janssens as Richard
- Vincent Colombe as Stan
- Guillaume Bouchède as Dimitri
- Jean-Louis Tribes as Roberto

== Production ==
=== Development ===
Coralie Fargeat was inspired to make a revenge film in the vein of Mad Max or Rambo, "with strong characters on a phantasmagoric journey". Though Fargeat was aware of the rape and revenge film genre, she did not set out to make a film of that type and had never seen I Spit on Your Grave, one of the most well-known films of the genre. Said Fargeat: "I wanted to take this story out of the genre of horror. I didn't want Jen to be screaming and suffering for the whole movie, trying to survive. I wanted her to go somewhere else and transform into a cool and badass character." One of Fargeat's inspirations was the Steven Spielberg film Duel because it manages to generate tension using "so few elements: a car, a truck and that's it".

=== Filming ===
Revenge was filmed at a Moroccan location, chosen for the nondescript, isolated appearance of its desert. Said Fargeat: "We had to find the villa, the desert, and the water in the same country. I loved the idea of not being able to recognize exactly where the desert is." A small village in the background of the villa was not filmed "to create the sense that the characters in the film are totally alone".

Principal photography on the film began on 6 February and wrapped on 21 March 2017.

Of the film's early scenes that view Jen through a male gaze and show her dancing with men, Fargeat said this was done because she "wanted to embrace the fascinating, polarising image of the Lolita. Jen can be empty and stupid and an object of desire if she wants. It shouldn't lead to [a sexual assault]." Fargeat also chose not to linger too much on the rape scene, saying, "For me that's not what the film's about. So I didn't feel the need to make it visually important. Before she is raped, she's told it's her fault, that she created the situation. I wanted to deal with the psychological and verbal violence towards her — the rape is symbolic of the way she's considered and treated."

== Release ==
The film had its world premiere at the 42nd Toronto International Film Festival on 11 September 2017. Prior to that, Shudder acquired distribution rights to the film. It was later revealed Neon would distribute the film theatrically in the United States, before its release on Shudder.

The film was released in France on 7 February 2018 by Rezo Films. It was released in the United States on 11 May 2018, in a limited release and through video on demand.

== Reception ==
=== Critical response ===
On the review aggregator website Rotten Tomatoes, 92% of 132 critics' reviews are positive, with an average rating of 7.6/10. The website's consensus reads: "Revenge slices and dices genre tropes, working within an exploitation framework while adding a timely – yet never less than viscerally thrilling – feminist spin." Metacritic, which uses a weighted average, assigned the film a score of 81 out of 100, based on 23 critics, indicating "universal acclaim".

TheWrap praised Revenge for its subversion of rape and revenge tropes and embraced the film as a welcome addition to the genre from a female lens. Andrew Whalen of Newsweek said the film is "the closest thing to a feminist rape-revenge tale since Abel Ferrara's Ms. 45". A. O. Scott of The New York Times wrote: "Blunt, bloody and stylish almost in spite of itself, Revenge is a synthesis of exploitation and feminism". Some critics compared the film to French New Extremity films like High Tension and Martyrs. Christy Lemire of RogerEbert.com awarded the film three and a half out of four, and wrote: "with cinematographer Robrecht Heyvaert, Fargeat has created a high-contrast hellscape, a place filled with equal amounts of danger and discovery".

According to TheWrap, among the tropes that Fargeat subverted were past films' tendency to focus on the violence done to the victim. Writing for Variety, Scott Tobias commented: "The small miracle of Revenge, an exceptionally potent and sure-handed first feature by French writer-director Coralie Fargeat, is that it adheres to the formula yet feels invigorating and new, a stylistic tour-de-force that also tweaks the sexual politics in meaningful ways." Lemire wrote: "Fargeat subverts and co-opts the male gaze, turning it into something that's both playful and fierce." TheWrap's April Wolfe appreciated that the character of Jen was nuanced and multilayered, mixing "bravada" and "vulnerability". Lutz was also lauded for her performance, with Tobias saying she rises to the emotional challenge and gives a "physical presence that's indomitable, like a blade forged in fire", and Lemire writing she is able to "[indicate] a massive character arc without many words".

Revenge was also noted for its larger focus on the theme of rebirth. David Sims of The Atlantic wrote: "Winking title aside, this is a movie more about transformation and transference than revenge...Fargeat is taking familiar, misogynistic iconography and setting it to boil, bringing all its cruelty and noxiousness to the surface. Revenge won't be an experience every viewer can handle, but as a piece of extreme horror, it's an intelligent and flashy debut." Lemire commented that the process of Jen's survival "requires a great deal of suspension of disbelief", although "Fargeat definitely emphasizes the 'fantasy' element of the rape-revenge fantasy genre, not only through Jen's resourcefulness but also with the dreamlike way in which she depicts her journey toward regaining control."

In a more critical review, Lena Wilson of Slate questioned whether the film can still be considered feminist if it conforms to rape and revenge film tropes, citing Jen's skimpy costuming throughout the film as an example. Wilson argued: "If rape is the pinnacle of male disregard for female life, what do we accomplish by presenting a protagonist who gleans and internalizes that violent indifference? Our protagonist is transformed, but she converts from one male fantasy to another: wide-eyed damsel to hardened action hero." Kevin Maher of The Times voiced a similar sentiment: "Labelled a 'feminist rape-revenge movie', it takes all the traditional tenets of that most dubious of genres and simply does them again."

=== Accolades ===
Award	Date of ceremony	Category	Recipient(s)	Result	Ref.
Bucheon International Fantastic Film Festival	July 20, 2018	Best Feature Film	Coralie Fargeat	Won	
Calgary Underground Film Festival	April 22, 2018	Best Narrative Feature	Coralie Fargeat	Won	
Fangoria Chainsaw Awards	February 25, 2019	Best Director	Coralie Fargeat	Nominated	
Fangoria Chainsaw Awards	February 25, 2019	Best Limited Release	Coralie Fargeat	Nominated	
Seattle Film Critics Society	December 17, 2018	Best Foreign Language Film	Coralie Fargeat	Nominated	
