= 5050x2020 =

Hashtag for gender parity in film industry

5050x2020 is a hashtag used to campaign for gender parity in the film industry. The campaign was launched by the Swedish Film Institute at the Cannes Film Festival in 2016.

== Origin ==
The campaign #5050x2020 was launched at the 2016 Cannes Film Festival, when the Swedish Film Institute hosted an event titled FiftyFifty by 2020. Featured speakers were Sweden's Minister for Culture and Democracy, Alice Bah Kuhnke, and France's Minister for Culture, Audrey Azoulay, alongside Roberto Olla, the Executive Director of Eurimages, and Anna Serner, CEO of the Swedish Film Institute. Additional participants included Oscar-nominated director Ruben Östlund, producer Emilie Lesclaux, producer Chiara Tilesi, and director Alexandra-Therese Keining.

== Background ==
When Anna Serner was appointed as CEO of the Swedish Film Institute in 2011, she made it a priority to ensure that half of all film funding would be allocated to female filmmakers. In 2011, women directed 26% of the films funded by the Swedish Film Institute. By 2014, the goal of 50% of the films funded by the Swedish Film Institute being directed by women was reached. Female directors now win approximately as many of the awards in the major categories at the Swedish national film awards as male directors (Guldbaggen).

== Impact ==
=== National film commissions ===
Shortly after the Swedish Film Institute's event at the Cannes Film Festival, several national film commissions and film institutes, such as the British Film Institute, Telefilm Canada, Screen Ireland and Screen Australia, committed to the gender parity goal of #5050x2020. Later, the Austrian Film Institute also joined the national film institutes working for 50/50 gender parity.

In September 2016, Creative Scotland made a commitment to gender equality across Scotland's five publicly funded arts sectors by making a formal pledge to achieve 50/50 gender balance across their boardrooms by 2020.

In October 2017, Eurimages, the cultural support fund of the Council of Europe, adopted a new Gender Equality Strategy aiming at 50/50 support divided across female and male film directors by 2020.

In the same month, the British Film Institute set a 50/50 gender balance as part of their new diversity targets.

=== National initiatives and campaigns ===
Several independent national initiatives and campaigns for gender parity in the film industry have also emerged under the banner #5050x2020. The British Film Institute's decision was largely influenced by campaigning by the organization Directors UK, starting in 2016, demanding that 50% of films backed by UK-based public funding bodies to be directed by women by 2020.

Also in the UK, ERA 50:50 is an industry-led campaign working for 50/50 gender balance on British stages and screens by 2020, with of support from actors including Emma Thompson, Jude Law, James McAvoy and Olivia Colman.

Similarly, the UK's National Theatre has committed to ensuring gender equality in terms of the directors and living writers the venue employs by 2021.

In France, the Collectif 5050x2020 was launched in March 2018 by the group Le Deuxieme Regard. The group consists of several hundred professionals from across the French cinema world, with the aim of working towards concrete steps to bring about equality across the business.

In December 2017, American talent agency ICM Partners pledged to commit to #5050x2020, and vowed that half the agency's partnership, half its department heads and half its board of directors would be women. "It's not enough to have 50 percent [female] employees," ICM Partners' managing director Chris Silbermann told The Hollywood Reporter. "Women have to be equally represented in true positions of leadership and influence throughout the company." Shortly thereafter, American talent agency Creative Artists Agency (CAA) committed to #5050x2020, meaning that its management and leadership would have equal gender participation by 2020. In a memo, agency president Richard Lovett wrote “We are so grateful to our female colleagues, clients and others across the industry for bringing focus to this necessary and overdue goal. Lasting change requires new day-to-day habits. We must act in support of our shared truth: Our business and our lives will be better and stronger if we treat each other the way we wish to be treated.”

In November 2018, the website The Wrap hosted an event called ”Power Women Summit – The Road to 50/50 by 2020” to address the gender imbalance in the US film industry.

=== International film festivals ===
Several national women's groups have worked towards getting leading international film festivals to sign pledges to work towards gender parity. After campaigning from the Collectif 5050x2020, the Cannes Film Festival signed a pledge in May 2018, “promising to compile statistics on the gender of the filmmakers and key crew members of movies submitted to the festival. The festival also promised to improve transparency around their selection processes by publicly listing the members of their selection and programming committees, and to work towards parity on their executive boards”.

In August 2018, the Venice Biennale, which runs the Venice Film Festival, signed a "Charter for Parity and Inclusion", after campaigning from the European Women's Audiovisual Network, Women in Film & TV International, WIFT Nordic, WIFT Sweden, and the Swiss Women's Audiovisual Network (SWAN), alongside Dissenso Comune and Women in Film, TV & Media Italia. Both Venice and Cannes have previously received criticism for not including female filmmakers in their respective film programming.

In June 2018, the Annecy International Animation Film Festival signed a pledge to promote gender equality and transparency at the festival as well as on the planning organization's staff, after campaigning by the organizations Women in Animation and Les Femmes s'Animent.

Following campaigning by the Swiss Women's Audiovisual Network (SWAN), the Locarno Film Festival signed a pledge for parity and inclusion in programming in August 2018. Also in August 2018, The Sarajevo Film Festival signed a pledge for gender parity.

In September 2018, The International Documentary Film Festival Amsterdam (IDFA) and the San Sebastian International Festival signed a pledge for #5050×2020 gender parity and inclusion, and in October 2018, Mill Valley International Film Festival and The Rome International Film Festival did the same.

In February 2019, The Berlin International Film Festival pledged to promote gender equality.

Following the 50/50 pledge, the official programme of Göteborg Film Festival 2020 will have a majority of female directors.
