= This Is All: The Pillow Book of Cordelia Kenn =

2005 novel by Aidan Chambers

This is All: The Pillow Book of Cordelia Kenn
- Author: Aidan Chambers
- Language: English
- Genre: Young adult literature
- Publisher: The Bodley Head
- Publication date: 2005
- Publication place: United Kingdom
- Media type: Print (paperback)
- Pages: 807
- ISBN: 978-0-370-32684-9

This is All: The Pillow Book of Cordelia Kenn is a young adult novel by Aidan Chambers, published in 2005.

It is the last work in the Dance Sequence series of six novels, preceded by Breaktime, Dance on My Grave, Now I Know, The Toll Bridge, and Postcards from No Man's Land.

== Synopsis ==
Teenager Cordelia Kenn writes a pillow book for her unborn daughter, speaking of her friendships, romantic experiences, poetry, her special relationship with her teacher Julie, a boy named Will, trees, and how her daughter came to be. The pillow book was inspired from Sei Shōnagon's pillow book during the Heian period in Japan, from which she also gets her inspiration for poetry from Poetry Immortal Izumi Shikibu. Throughout the book's 800 pages, Cordelia's teenage years and her character are written and made important to readers.

== Bibliography ==
- This Is All: The Pillow Book of Cordelia Kenn, The Bodley Head, 2005, ISBN 978-0-370-32684-9; reprint Amulet Books, 2008, ISBN 978-0-8109-9550-5
