= Postcards from No Man's Land =

1999 young adult novel by Aidan Chambers

- Front cover of first edition
- Author: Aidan Chambers
- Language: English
- Series: Dance Sequence
- Genre: Young adult literature, war novel
- Publisher: The Bodley Head
- Publication date: 7 January 1999
- Publication place: United Kingdom
- Media type: Print (paperback)
- Pages: 336 pp (first edition)
- ISBN: 0-370-32376-9
- OCLC: 477161980
- LC Class: PZ7.C3557 Po 2002
- Preceded by: The Toll Bridge
- Followed by: This Is All: The Pillow Book of Cordelia Kenn

Postcards from No Man's Land is a young-adult novel by Aidan Chambers, published by Bodley Head in 1999. Two stories are set in Amsterdam during 1994 and 1944. One features 17-year-old visitor Jacob Todd during the 50-year commemoration of the Battle of Arnhem, in which his grandfather fought; the other features 19-year-old Geertrui late in the German occupation of the Netherlands. It was the fifth of six novels in the series Chambers calls The Dance Sequence, which he inaugurated in 1978 with Breaktime.

Chambers won the annual Carnegie Medal, from the Library Association, recognising the year's best children's book by a British subject. In 2001 The Guardian named it one of ten books recommended for teenage boys, and called it a "seriously good and compulsively readable novel that spans 50 years and two interwoven stories of love, betrayal and self-discovery".

Postcards from No Man's Land was first published in the U.S. by Dutton in 2002. There it won the Michael L. Printz Award from the American Library Association recognising the year's best book for young adults. (Note: The Printz Award, inaugurated for 1999 publications, is the premier ALA award for young adult literature. Unlike the Newbery Medal for children's books, it is open to non-U.S. authors and to "old" books newly published in the U.S.)

WorldCat reported that Postcards is the work by Chambers most widely held in participating libraries, by a wide margin.

One library catalogue record recommends Postcards for American "senior high school" students and the British librarians call it a "sophisticated book for older teenagers", which explores issues of euthanasia and sexual identity.

== Notes ==
Awards
Preceded by Skellig	Carnegie Medal recipient 1999	Succeeded by The Other Side of Truth
