= François Ozon =

French film director and screenwriter (born 1967)

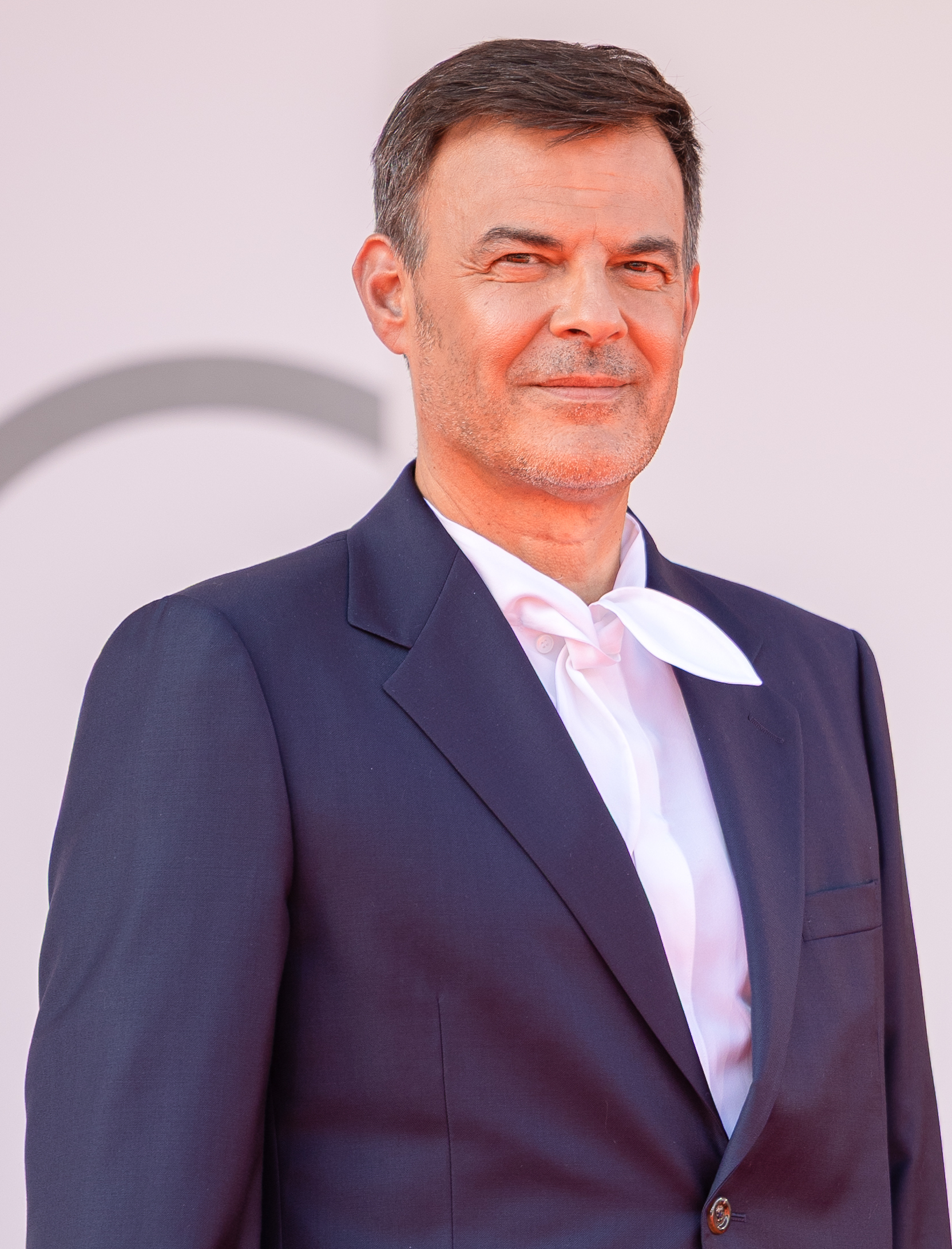
- Ozon in 2025
- Born: 15 November 1967 (age 58); Paris, France
- Education: La Fémis, University of Paris I
- Occupation: Filmmaker
- Years active: 1988–present
- Website: www.francois-ozon.com

François Ozon (French: [fʁɑ̃swa ozɔ̃]; born 15 November 1967) is a French filmmaker, considered one of the most important contemporary French filmmakers, closely associated with the cinema du corps ("cinema of the body"). His films are characterized by aesthetic beauty, sharp satirical humor and a free-wheeling view of human sexuality. Recurring themes in his films are existentialism, sexual identity, perceptions of reality, and death.

Ozon has achieved international acclaim for his films 8 Women (2002) and Swimming Pool (2003). Other critically acclaimed films include: the erotic drama Young & Beautiful (2013), the war drama Frantz (2016), the drama By the Grace of God (2019), and the Albert Camus' adaptation The Stranger (2025).

== Early life ==
François Ozon was born in Paris, into a family of four children, the son of a biologist father and a French teacher mother, and received a Catholic education.

Ozon developed a passion for cinema at an early age. He made a few appearances as an extra, notably in Claude Pinoteau's L'Étudiante, and shot several amateur Super 8 short films featuring his family members.

After earning a master's degree in film studies from the University of Paris I, he entered the Directing Department at La Fémis in 1990, graduating with the Class of 1994. It was there that he first met his future recurrent producers, Olivier Delbosc and Marc Missonnier.

== Career ==
=== 1990s ===
Ozon directed several short films such as A Summer Dress (1996) and Scènes de lit (1998). His motion picture directing debut was Sitcom (also 1998), which was well received by both critics and audiences.

In Paris, he met Philippe Rombi, who was composing music for students at La Fémis alongside his studies at the CNSMDP. Rombi would go on to compose the scores for almost all of Ozon's feature films.

=== 2000s ===
Ozon achieved international recognition with the adaptation of Rainer Werner Fassbinder's play Tropfen auf heiße Steine in Water Drops on Burning Rocks (2000). The film won the Teddy Award at the 50th Berlin International Film Festival.

For Under the Sand (2000), Ozon was nominated for the first time for the César Award for Best Director and the European Film Award for Best Director. The film was also openly praised by Swedish filmmaker Ingmar Bergman.

In 2003, François Ozon founded the production company FOZ, which co-produces most of his films.

8 Women (2002), starring Catherine Deneuve, Fanny Ardant, Isabelle Huppert and Emmanuelle Béart, a quirky mix of musical numbers and murder mystery and a production design harking back to 1950s Hollywood melodramas such as those directed by Douglas Sirk, was his first commercial success. The film was nominated for Best Film, Best Director, and Best Original Screenplay at the 28th César Awards.

His English-language debut, Swimming Pool (2003), starring Charlotte Rampling and Ludivine Sagnier, was considered by Ozon a very personal film that gives insight into the difficult process of writing a novel or screenplay. The film had its world premiere in the main competition of the 2003 Cannes Film Festival, marking his first film nominated for the Palme d'Or.

5x2 (2004) had its world premiere in the main competition of the 61st Venice International Film Festival, where it was nominated for the Golden Lion. Time to Leave (2005) selected for the Un Certain Regard section of the 2005 Cannes Film Festival.

Angel (2007), starring Romola Garai Sam Neill, Michael Fassbender and Charlotte Rampling, was selected for the main competition of the 57th Berlin International Film Festival, where it was nominated for the Golden Bear. The film, based on a novel by British writer Elizabeth Taylor, follows the story of a poor girl who climbs Edwardian England's social ladder by becoming a romance writer. The film was shot at Tyntesfield House and Estate near Bristol, at other UK locations and in Belgium. While filming Angel, Ozon developed a strong friendship with Garai and called her his "muse".

In 2009, Ozon released two films, Ricky, which had its world premiere in the main competition of the 59th Berlin International Film Festival, and The Refuge, which had its world premiere at the 2009 Toronto International Film Festival.

=== 2010s ===
Potiche (2010), starring Catherine Deneuve, Gérard Depardieu, Fabrice Luchini, Karin Viard, Judith Godrèche and Jérémie Renier, had its world premiere in the main competition of the 67th Venice International Film Festival, where it was nominated for the Golden Lion and the Queer Palm. The film marked another huge box office hit for Ozon, and was nominated for the BAFTA Award for Best Film Not in the English Language.

At the 62nd Berlin International Film Festival, Ozon served as a member of the main competition jury. Later that year, he released the comedy film In the House, which had its world premiere at the 2012 Toronto International Film Festival, and won the Golden Shell at the 2012 San Sebastián International Film Festival. For the film, he won the European Film Award for Best Screenwriter at the 26th ceremony.

Young & Beautiful (2013) had its world premiere in the main competition of the 2013 Cannes Film Festival, and was nominated for the Palme d'Or. It received positive reviews from critics. His erotic-drama film The New Girlfriend (2014) had its world premiere at the 2014 Toronto International Film Festival. It stars Romain Duris, Anaïs Demoustier, Raphaël Personnaz, and Isild Le Besco.

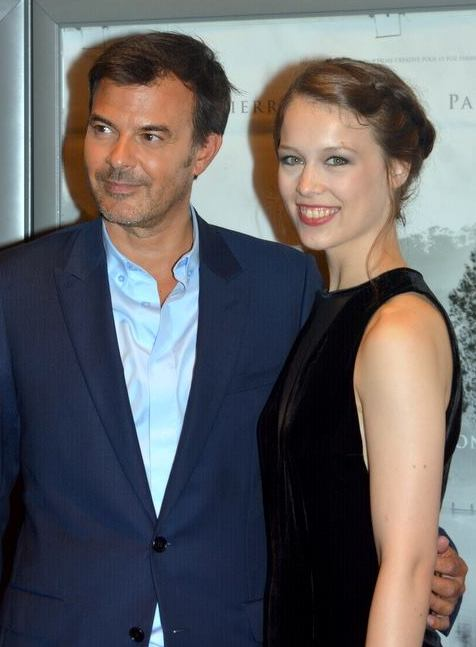
Ozon and Paula Beer in 2016.

Frantz (2016), starring Paula Beer and Pierre Niney, follows the aftermath of the World War I, had its world premiere in the main competition of the 73rd Venice International Film Festival, where Beer won the Marcello Mastroianni Award. At the 42nd César Awards, it was nominated for Best Film, Best Director, and Best Adaptation.

The erotic thriller L'Amant double (2017), based on the 1987 novel Lives of the Twins (also known as Kindred Passions) by Joyce Carol Oates, starred Jérémie Renier, in the dual twin roles, alongside Marine Vacth. It was selected for the main competition of the 2017 Cannes Film Festival, where it was nominated for the Palme d'Or.

His drama film By the Grace of God (2019) had its world premiere in the main competition of the 69th Berlin International Film Festival, where it won the Silver Bear Grand Jury Prize. Starring Melvil Poupaud, Denis Ménochet, and Swann Arlaud, it follows the exposing of sexual abuse hidden by the Catholic Church. At the 45th César Awards, it was nominated for Best Film, Best Director, and Best Original Screenplay.

=== 2020s ===
His coming-of-age gay drama film Summer of 85 (2020), starring Félix Lefebvre and Benjamin Voisin, was selected for the 73rd Cannes Film Festival, but the festival was canceled due to the COVID-19 pandemic. The film was one of the first films released during the theaters reopening in France on 14 July 2020. It received positive reviews. At the 46th César Awards, it was nominated for Best Film, Best Director, and Best Adaptation.

Everything Went Fine (2021) had its world premiere in the main competition of the 2021 Cannes Film Festival, where it was nominated for the Palme d'Or. Starring Sophie Marceau, André Dussollier, Géraldine Pailhas, and Charlotte Rampling, it follows the euthanasia and assisted suicide legalization debate in France.

Peter von Kant (2022), a gender-flipped reinterpretation of Rainer Werner Fassbinder's 1972 film The Bitter Tears of Petra von Kant, has its world premiere in the main competition of the 72nd Berlin International Film Festival, where it was nominated for the Golden Bear and the Teddy Award.

The crime comedy The Crime Is Mine (2023), starring Nadia Tereszkiewicz, Rebecca Marder, Isabelle Huppert, and Fabrice Luchini, a loose adaptation of the 1934 play Mon crime by Georges Berr and Louis Verneuil, was a box office success in France. He followed with When Fall Is Coming (2024), which won the Jury Prize for Best Screenplay at the 72nd San Sebastián International Film Festival.

The Stranger (2025), an adaptation of Albert Camus' 1942 novel, marked his reunion with Benjamin Voisin. The film had its world premiere in the main competition of the 82nd Venice International Film Festival, where it was nominated for the Golden Lion. It received positive reviews from critics, and was a modest box office success. At the 51st César Awards, Pierre Lottin won Best Supporting Actor and Voisin was nominated for Best Actor.

=== Upcoming projects ===
His upcoming drama film Summer of Fire is scheduled to be theatrically released in France in February 2027 by Gaumont. Starring Pio Marmaï and Sandor Funtek, it follows a 12-year-old boy who is sent by his mother to spend the summer in Normandy with his father and his father’s boyfriend.

== Personal life ==
Ozon is openly gay.

== Filmography ==
=== Feature films ===
| Year | Title | Director | Writer | Notes |
|---|---|---|---|---|
| 1997 | See the Sea | Yes | Yes | Medium-length film |
| 1998 | Sitcom | Yes | Yes | |
| 1999 | Criminal Lovers | Yes | Yes | |
| 2000 | Water Drops on Burning Rocks | Yes | Yes | |
| 2000 | Under the Sand | Yes | Yes | |
| 2002 | 8 Women | Yes | Yes | |
| 2003 | Swimming Pool | Yes | Yes | |
| 2004 | 5x2 | Yes | Yes | |
| 2005 | Time to Leave | Yes | Yes | |
| 2007 | Angel | Yes | Yes | |
| 2009 | Ricky | Yes | Yes | |
| 2009 | The Refuge | Yes | Yes | |
| 2010 | Potiche | Yes | Yes | |
| 2012 | In the House | Yes | Yes | |
| 2013 | Young & Beautiful | Yes | Yes | |
| 2014 | The New Girlfriend | Yes | Yes | |
| 2016 | Frantz | Yes | Yes | |
| 2017 | L'Amant double | Yes | Yes | |
| 2019 | By the Grace of God | Yes | Yes | |
| 2020 | Summer of 85 | Yes | Yes | |
| 2021 | Everything Went Fine | Yes | Yes | |
| 2022 | Peter von Kant | Yes | Yes | |
| 2023 | The Crime Is Mine | Yes | Yes | |
| 2024 | When Fall Is Coming | Yes | Yes | |
| 2025 | The Stranger | Yes | Yes | |
| 2027 | Summer of Fire | Yes | Yes | Post-production |

=== Short film ===
| Year | Title | Director | Writer | Notes |
|---|---|---|---|---|
| 1988 | Photo de famille | Yes | Yes | Also editor and cinematographer |
| 1988 | Les Doigts dans le ventre | Yes | Yes | Also editor, cinematographer and producer |
| 1990 | Mes parents un jour d'été | Yes | Yes | Also producer |
| 1991 | Une goutte de sang | Yes | | |
| 1991 | Deux plus un | Yes | | |
| 1992 | Thomas reconstitué | Yes | Yes | |
| 1993 | Victor | Yes | Yes | |
| 1994 | Une rose entre nous | Yes | Yes | Also actor |
| 1994 | Truth or Dare | Yes | Yes | Also editor French Syndicate of Cinema Critics - Best Short Film |
| 1995 | Little Death | Yes | Yes | |
| 1996 | A Summer Dress | Yes | Yes | L.A. Outfest - Audience Award for Outstanding Narrative Short Film; Nominated—César Award for Best Short Film |
| 1998 | Scènes de lit ("Le trou noir", "Monsieur propre", "Madame", "Tête-bêche", "L'homme idéal", "Love in the dark", "Les puceaux") | Yes | Yes | Also editor Avignon Film Festival - Prix Panavision |
| 1998 | X2000 | Yes | Yes | Clermont-Ferrand International Short Film Festival - Special Mention of the Jury |
| 2006 | A Curtain Raiser | Yes | Yes | |
| 2007 | Quand la peur dévore l'âme | Yes | | Also editor |

=== Documentary shorts ===
| Year | Title | Notes |
|---|---|---|
| 1991 | Peau contre peau (les risques inutiles) | |
| 1991 | Le Trou madame | |
| 1995 | Jospin s'éclaire | Also editor |

== Accolades ==
- 1999: Seattle International Film Festival - Emerging Masters Showcase Award
- 2004: Filmfest Hamburg - Douglas-Sirk-Award
- 2006: Frameline Film Festival - Frameline Award
- 2011: Jameson Dublin International Film Festival - Career Achievement Award

| Year | Award | Category | Work | Result | Ref. |
|---|---|---|---|---|---|
| 1997 | César Awards | Best Short Film | A Summer Dress | Nominated | |
| 2000 | Berlin Film Festival | Golden Bear | Water Drops on Burning Rocks | Nominated | |
| 2000 | Berlin Film Festival | Teddy Award for Best Feature Film | Water Drops on Burning Rocks | Won | |
| 2001 | European Film Awards | Best Director | Under the Sand | Nominated | |
| 2002 | César Awards | Best Film | Under the Sand | Nominated | |
| 2002 | César Awards | Best Director | Under the Sand | Nominated | |
| 2002 | Berlin Film Festival | Golden Bear | 8 Women | Nominated | |
| 2002 | European Film Awards | Best Film | 8 Women | Nominated | |
| 2002 | European Film Awards | Best Screenwriter | 8 Women | Nominated | |
| 2002 | European Film Awards | People's Choice Award for Best European Film | 8 Women | Nominated | |
| 2003 | César Awards | Best Film | 8 Women | Nominated | |
| 2003 | César Awards | Best Director | 8 Women | Nominated | |
| 2003 | César Awards | Best Screenplay, Original or Adapted | 8 Women | Nominated | |
| 2003 | Lumière Awards | Best Director | 8 Women | Won | |
| 2003 | Cannes Film Festival | Palme d'Or | Swimming Pool | Nominated | |
| 2003 | European Film Awards | Best Film | Swimming Pool | Nominated | |
| 2003 | European Film Awards | People's Choice Award for Best European Film | Swimming Pool | Nominated | |
| 2004 | Venice Film Festival | Golden Lion | 5x2 | Nominated | |
| 2005 | Cannes Film Festival | Un Certain Regard | Time to Leave | Nominated | |
| 2007 | Berlin Film Festival | Golden Bear | Angel | Nominated | |
| 2009 | Berlin Film Festival | Golden Bear | Ricky | Nominated | |
| 2010 | Venice Film Festival | Golden Lion | Potiche | Nominated | |
| 2010 | Venice Film Festival | Queer Lion | Potiche | Nominated | |
| 2011 | British Academy Film Awards | Best Film Not in the English Language | Potiche | Nominated | |
| 2011 | César Awards | Best Adaptation | Potiche | Nominated | |
| 2011 | European Film Awards | People's Choice Award for Best European Film | Potiche | Nominated | |
| 2012 | Goya Awards | Best European Film | In the House | Nominated | |
| 2013 | Cannes Film Festival | Palme d'Or | Young & Beautiful | Nominated | |
| 2013 | César Awards | Best Film | In the House | Nominated | |
| 2013 | César Awards | Best Director | In the House | Nominated | |
| 2013 | César Awards | Best Adaptation | In the House | Nominated | |
| 2013 | European Film Awards | Best Director | In the House | Nominated | |
| 2013 | European Film Awards | Best Screenwriter | In the House | Won | |
| 2016 | Venice Film Festival | Golden Lion | Frantz | Nominated | |
| 2017 | Cannes Film Festival | Palme d'Or | L'Amant double | Nominated | |
| 2017 | César Awards | Best Film | Frantz | Nominated | |
| 2017 | César Awards | Best Director | Frantz | Nominated | |
| 2017 | César Awards | Best Adaptation | Frantz | Nominated | |
| 2017 | European Film Awards | Best Screenwriter | Frantz | Nominated | |
| 2017 | European Film Awards | People's Choice Award for Best European Film | Frantz | Nominated | |
| 2017 | Lumière Awards | Best Screenplay | Frantz | Nominated | |
| 2018 | Bodil Awards | Best Non-American Film | Frantz | Nominated | |
| 2018 | Robert Awards | Best Non-American Film | Frantz | Nominated | |
| 2019 | Berlin Film Festival | Golden Bear | By the Grace of God | Nominated | |
| 2019 | Berlin Film Festival | Silver Bear Grand Jury Prize | By the Grace of God | Won | |
| 2020 | César Awards | Best Film | By the Grace of God | Nominated | |
| 2020 | César Awards | Best Director | By the Grace of God | Nominated | |
| 2020 | César Awards | Best Original Screenplay | By the Grace of God | Nominated | |
| 2020 | Lumière Awards | Best Film | By the Grace of God | Nominated | |
| 2020 | Lumière Awards | Best Screenplay | By the Grace of God | Nominated | |
| 2020 | European Film Awards | Best Director | Summer of 85 | Nominated | |
| 2021 | César Awards | Best Film | Summer of 85 | Nominated | |
| 2021 | César Awards | Best Director | Summer of 85 | Nominated | |
| 2021 | César Awards | Best Adaptation | Summer of 85 | Nominated | |
| 2021 | Cannes Film Festival | Palme d'Or | Everything Went Fine | Nominated | |
| 2022 | Berlin Film Festival | Golden Bear | Peter von Kant | Nominated | |
| 2022 | Berlin Film Festival | Teddy Award for Best Feature Film | Peter von Kant | Nominated | |
| 2025 | Lumière Awards | Best Director | When Fall Is Coming | Nominated | |
| 2025 | Lumière Awards | Best Screenplay | When Fall Is Coming | Nominated | |
