= Samuel August från Sevedstorp och Hanna i Hult =

Book by Astrid Lindgren

Samuel August from Sevedstorp and Hanna i Hult
- Author: Astrid Lindgren
- Original title: Samuel August från Sevedstorp och Hanna i Hult
- Illustrator: Målning Dahl and Georg Dahl
- Language: Swedish
- Publisher: Rabén & Sjögren
- Publication date: 1975
- Publication place: Sweden
- English publication date: 2007

Samuel August from Sevedstorp and Hanna i Hult (Swedish: Samuel August från Sevedstorp och Hanna i Hult) is a book by Astrid Lindgren and deals with the love story of her parents Samuel August Erikson and Hanna Jonsson.

== Plot ==
At the age of thirteen Samuel August falls in love with the nine-year-old Hanna. Soon Samuel August leaves school and does not see Hannah again for quite a while. Until he is eighteen, Samuel August is working as a farmhand, but one day the vicarage Näs near Vimmerby is offered for lease and Samuel August becomes the new tenant of the vicarage. Over the next few years, Samuel rarely meets Hanna. At the age of 25, Samuel August watches Hanna at a festival, but he doesn't dare to speak to her. Many men are interested in Hanna and Samuel August doesn't believe that she would choose him. At a wedding, Hanna realizes that Samuel August is in love with her and invites Samuel August to go for a walk with her. Hanna promises to stitch a monogram on Samuels hat. After a few months have passed and Samuel August has not seen Hanna, Samuel August writes a letter to Hanna, who replies, and they exchange letters until Samuel August unexpectedly meets Hanna again in Vimmerby and drinks tea with her. Later he asks Hanna if they could live together. Hanna replies that the two of them cannot decide this on their own, but at least she gives Samuel August the first kiss. Hanna hesitates a little before the wedding takes place on June 30, 1905. When Samuel August brings his wife to Näs a fortnight later, they are living there together for another 56 years. As long as he is alive, Samuel August mentions daily how much he loves his Hanna.

== Contents ==
English title (Note: If the story was not translated into English, the literal translation of the title is mentioned (in brackets).)	Swedish original title
Samuel August from Sevedstorp and Hanna i Hult	Samuel August från Sevedstorp och Hanna i Hult
I remember...	Minnes...
(It started in Kristin's kitchen)	Det började i Kristins kök
Short Talk with a Prospective Children's Writer	Litet samtal med en blivande barnboksförfattare
(Has the book got a future?)	Har boken en framtid?
(There are different trees)	Finns det olika träd
(Andrew Peterson - a Swedish pioneer in America)	Andrew Peterson - en svensk pionjär i Amerika
(Luise Justine Mejer: a love story from Germany in the 18th century)	Luise Justine Mejer: en kärlekshistoria från 1700-talets Tyskland

== Overview ==
The book is about the love story of Astrid Lindgren's parents. In Sweden, the book was first published in 1975 by Rabén & Sjögren. It was titled Samuel August från Sevedstorp och Hanna i Hult. Later an audiobook was released which was read by the author Astrid Lindgren. The book has been translated into many languages, including German. Three of the essays from the book Samuel August from Sevedstorp and Hanna i Hult have also been translated into English. The book has been translated by Marlaine Delargy. The English version was published by the Swedish Book Review in their second edition of their magazine in 2007. I remember... (Minnes...) was translated by Patricia Crampton and first published in 1988 in the journal Signal: Approaches to Children's Books. Short Talk with a Prospective Children's Writer (Litet samtal med en blivande barnboksförfattare) was translated by Roger G. Tanner and was first published in June 1973 in The Horn Book Magazine.

In 1999 the book was chosen as the love story of the century in Sweden.

Besides the love story itself, the Swedish edition of the book also includes a few other essays, for example Det började i Kristins kök, in which Astrid Lindgren writes about her neighbour Kristin who read the first books to her and made Astrid Lindgren become interested in literature. In another chapter Minnes.... (Let us remember) Lindgren is talking about her childhood, inspired by a poem from Harry Martinson.

In 2015, in Sweden the essay Luise Justine Mejer: en kärlekshistoria från 1700-talets Tyskland was released as a book on its own by Novelix. It is about the German book Ich war wohl klug, daß ich dich fand, which contains letters of Luise Mejer and Heinrich Christian Boie. Astrid Lindgren originally got the book from her German friend Luise Hartung and was impressed by the love story.

== Editions ==
- Samuel August från Sevedstorp och Hanna i Hult (1975), Swedish edition
- Das entschwundene Land (1977), Oetinger Verlag, German edition
- Samuel August from Sevedstorp and Hanna from Hult (2007), Swedish Book Review, issue #2, pp. 6-12, English edition
- I remember... (1988), Signal: Approaches to Children's Books, pp. 155–169, English edition
- I remember... (2002), Swedish Book Review: issue #1, pp. 13–19, English edition
- Short Talk with a Prospective Children's Writer (1973), The Horn Book Magazine, June 1973, English edition
