= Julie-Anne Roth =

French actress (born 1973)

- Born: 31 March 1973 (age 53); France
- Occupation: Actress
- Years active: 1989–present

Julie-Anne Roth (born 31 March 1973) is a French actress. From 1996 to 1999 Roth studied at the CNSAD. She appeared in more than sixty films since 1989.

== Theater ==
Year	Title	Author	Director
1995	King Lear	William Shakespeare	Pierre Debauche
1996	Sylvia	A. R. Gurney	Lars Schmidt
1999-2000	Romeo and Juliet	William Shakespeare	Stuart Seide
2001-2003	Twelfth Night	William Shakespeare	Dan Jemmett
2004-2005	Women Beware Women	Thomas Middleton	Dan Jemmett
2007-2008	La Place royale	Pierre Corneille	Catherine Delattres
2007-2009	Measure for Measure	William Shakespeare	Adel Hakim
2009-2010	(Self) service	Anne-Cécile Vandalem	Anne-Cécile Vandalem
2010	Les Acteurs de bonne foi	Pierre de Marivaux	David Géry
2010-2012	The Comedy of Errors	William Shakespeare	Dan Jemmett
2015	The Village Bike	Penelope Skinner	Claudia Stavisky
2018	Bluebird	Simon Stephens	Claire Devers
2021-2023	Films fantômes	Albin de la Simone	Albin de la Simone

== Filmography ==
=== Film ===
Year	Title	Role	Director	Notes
1994	La Reine Margot	The kitchen girl	Patrice Chéreau	
1994	L'histoire du garçon qui voulait qu'on l'embrasse		Philippe Harel	
1994	Quelqu'un	The young woman	Marie Vermillard	Short
1995	Le Péril jeune	Marie	Cédric Klapisch	
1997	Nuits blanches	The flash-back girl	Sophie Deflandre	
1999	C'est quoi la vie?	Pauline	François Dupeyron	
1999	The Messenger: The Story of Joan of Arc	Young Girl in Bath	Luc Besson	
2000	Vatel	Maidservant	Roland Joffé	
2002	Requiem	Carla	Hervé Renoh	
2002	Le grand soir	Véronique Maurin	Stéphane Brisset	Short
2004	The Syrian Bride	Jeanne	Eran Riklis	
2004	Madame Édouard	Marie	Nadine Monfils	
2005	Good Girl	Cléia	Sophie Fillières	
2005	The Demon Stirs	Claire	Marie Pascale Osterrieth	
2005	Asphalte	The bride	Pierre Meunier	Short
2006	The Little Cat Is Dead	Lise	Pierre Coré	Short
2009	Un chat un chat	The tobacco seller	Sophie Fillières	
2009	Around a Small Mountain	Xénie	Jacques Rivette	
2009	Looking for Steven Spielberg	Hermione	Benjamin Guillard	Short
2010	Top Floor, Left Wing	Lieutenant Saroyan	Angelo Cianci	
2011	Propriété interdite	The real estate agent	Hélène Angel	
2011	Les yeux de sa mère	The journalist	Thierry Klifa	
2011	Famille	Sarah	Christophe Loizillon	Short
2012	David et Madame Hansen	Clémence	Alexandre Astier	
2012	Happiness Never Comes Alone	Chris Tamalet	James Huth	
2013	Nuts	The shrink patient	Yann Coridian	
2013	Bicycling with Molière	Betty	Philippe Le Guay	
2014	Jamais jamais	Françoise Ruiz	Erwan Le Duc	Short
2014	Grandes ondes	The woman	Lucas Loubaresse	Short
2014	Ni une, ni deux		Erwan Le Duc	Short
2014	Ni sucre, ni couronnes	Olivia	Vanessa Lepinard	Short
2014	En avant, calme et droit	Romy	Julie-Anne Roth	Short
2017	Grain de poussière	The teacher	Léopold Kraus	Short
2018	Naked Normandy	Valérie Levasseur	Philippe Le Guay	
2019	L'Ordre des médecins	The urgentist	David Roux	
2019	2 minutes 30	Nathalie	Mehdi Fikri	Short
2020	Simon's Got a Gift	Agnès Durant	Léo Karmann	
2022	Canailles	Catherine	Christophe Offenstein	
2022	Beautiful Minds	Nicole	Bernard Campan & Alexandre Jollien	
2022	Toutes les deux	Lily	Clara Lemaire Anspach	Short
2023	White Paradise	The nurse	Guillaume Renusson	

=== Television ===
Year	Title	Role	Director	Notes
1989	Le vagabond de la Bastille	Manon Chantelou	Michel Andrieu	TV movie
1990	Counterstrike	Marie	Douglas Jackson	Episode: "Thanos" (credited as Julie-Anne Rauth)
1993	Gabriel	Esther	Mounir Dridi	TV movie
1993	Lethal Exposure	Julie	Kevin Connor	TV movie
1993	L'affaire Seznec	Marie Seznec	Yves Boisset	TV movie
1993	L'instit	Lilas	François Luciani	1 episode
1993	Le voyant		Alain Schwartzstein	1 episode
1994	Balle perdue	Christelle	Étienne Périer	TV movie
1994	Des enfants dans les arbres		Pierre Boutron	TV movie
1996	Le sang du renard	Marinette	Serge Meynard	TV movie
1996	Le choix de la nuit	Claire Béraud	Thierry Binisti	TV movie
1996	La femme de la forêt	Mayalène	Arnaud Sélignac	TV movie
1996	Navarro	Marie Blosky	Patrick Jamain	1 episode
1998	Les moissons de l'océan	Gracianne	François Luciani	TV movie
1999	Trois saisons	Flavie	Edwin Baily	TV movie
1999	De mère inconnue	Marie	Emmanuelle Cuau	TV movie
2000	Cévennes		Frédérique Topin	1 episode
2002	L'année des grandes filles	Fofette	Jacques Renard	TV movie
2002	Femmes de loi	Aurélie Sayan	Laurent Carcélès	1 episode
2003	Marylin et ses enfants	Sarah	Charli Beléteau	TV movie
2003	Les enfants de Charlotte	Charlotte Larmant	François Luciani	TV movie
2006	Commissaire Cordier	Marina	Bertrand Van Effenterre	1 episode
2007	Sécurité intérieure	Lou Carpentier	Patrick & Emilie Grandperret	TV miniseries
2008	De sang et d'encre	Noémie	Charlotte Brändström	TV movie
2009	Les associés	Anna	Alain Berliner	TV movie
2010	Les vivants et les morts	Florence Chamard	Gérard Mordillat	TV miniseries
2011	Dans la peau d'une grande	Marie-Lou	Pascal Lahmani	TV movie
2012	Lili David	Lili David	Christophe Barraud	TV movie
2012	Paradis criminel	Marion Roussel	Serge Meynard	TV movie
2013	Josephine, Guardian Angel	Elena	Jean-Marc Seban	1 episode
2014	Coût de chance	Claire Fares	Denis Malleval	TV movie
2015	Les années perdues	Juliette Jourdan	Nicolas Picard-Dreyfuss	TV movie
2015	Accused	Charlotte	Didier Bivel	1 episode
2017	Souviens-toi	Charlotte Belgarde	Pierre Aknine	TV miniseries
2018	Profilage	Fouchet	Laure de Butler	1 episode
2019	La part du soupçon	Virginie Plouermel	Christophe Lamotte	TV movie
2019	La Malédiction de Provins	Chloé Médard	Olivier Doran	TV movie
2020	Apprendre à t'aimer	Karine	Stéphanie Pillonca	TV movie
2020	Pour l'honneur d'un fils	Marion Croze	Olivier Guignard	TV movie
2020	Moloch	Lucie	Arnaud Malherbe	TV miniseries
2020	Call My Agent!	Laurence	Antoine Garceau	1 episode
2020	Candice Renoir	Muriel Hoarau	Pascal Lahmani	1 episode
2020	Faites des gosses	Valérie	Philippe Lefebvre	2 episodes
2021	Les Pennac	Annabelle Pennac	Chris Nahon	TV movie
2021	Meurtres en Berry	Aline Mercier	Floriane Crépin	TV movie
2021	Gone for Good	Florence Lucchesi	Juan Carlos Medina	TV miniseries
2021	L'art du crime	Odile Meyer	Elsa Bennett & Hippolyte Dard	1 episode
2022	Meurtres à Figeac	Sophie	Olivier Barma	TV movie
2022	3615 Monique	The notary	Guillaume Renusson	TV miniseries

== Awards and nominations ==
Year	Award	Nominated work	Result
1997	Molière Award for Most Promising Actress	Sylvia	Nominated
