= Summer of 85 =

2020 film by François Ozon

- Theatrical release poster
- French: Été 85
- Directed by: François Ozon
- Screenplay by: François Ozon
- Based on: Dance on My Grave by Aidan Chambers
- Produced by: Éric Altmayer; Nicolas Altmayer
- Starring: Félix Lefebvre; Benjamin Voisin; Philippine Velge; Valeria Bruni Tedeschi; Melvil Poupaud; Isabelle Nanty
- Cinematography: Hichame Alaouié
- Edited by: Laure Gardette
- Music by: Jean-Benoît Dunckel
- Production companies: Mandarin Films; Scope Pictures; Canal+; Playtime; CNC; OCS; France 2 Cinéma
- Distributed by: Diaphana Distribution
- Release date: 14 July 2020 (France)
- Running time: 100 minutes
- Countries: France; Belgium
- Language: French
- Box office: $3.7 million

Summer of 85 (French: Été 85) is a 2020 romantic drama film written and directed by François Ozon, partly based on the 1982 novel Dance on My Grave by Aidan Chambers. It stars Félix Lefebvre and Benjamin Voisin.

It was released in France on 14 July 2020 by Diaphana Distribution.

== Plot ==
In the summer of 1985 in Normandy, Alexis, a 16-year-old who is fascinated by death, takes a friend's sailing dinghy out to sea. A sudden thunderstorm capsizes his boat, and he is rescued by David Gorman, who is a couple of years older. The pair goes to David's house, where Alexis meets his overpowering but caring single mother and learns that David is obliged to work at the family fishing equipment shop following his father's death. Alexis also adopts the name Alex, after David's mother mishears his name. Alex has a tumultuous relationship with his working-class parents: his father insists he drop out of school to work, while Alex is passionate about writing. After an argument with his father, Alex starts to work part-time at the Gormans' shop while contemplating his future. Alex and David's friendship deepens, and David's mother adores Alex.

Alex begins to grow suspicious of David after he rescues a drunk man from the middle of the street. The two have an argument as Alex believes David had sex with him, due to his returning to his house at 4 in the morning. David and Alex begin a romantic and sexual relationship over the course of six weeks, which Alex describes as the happiest time of his life. They spend their time sailing, going out on David's motorcycle, watching movies, and going to a local fairground.

David has an affair with Kate, a British au pair whom Alex had befriended, resulting in an argument between Alex and him, where David claims he is bored with their relationship. Alex rushes out of the shop, but shortly after, encouraged by his mother, David chases after Alex on his motorbike, but is killed in a crash. Alex is rejected by Madame Gorman.

With Kate's help, Alex dresses up and sneaks inside the morgue to see David's corpse. He decides that he must carry out the pact they had sworn: that one of them should dance on the grave of whoever dies first. Alex gets arrested while doing so, but the judge takes pity after hearing his story, albeit slightly altered, and sentences him to 140 hours of community service and a recommendation to visit a psychiatrist.

The film, partly narrated by Alexis, alternates between scenes of the two boys' relationship before David's death and scenes of the aftermath of the accident, in which Alex finds healing in writing his story for his trial, on his literature teacher's recommendation. The film ends with Alexis undertaking his community service on the beach, befriending the drunk man David had rescued.

== Cast ==
- Félix Lefebvre as Alexis Robin
- Benjamin Voisin as David Gorman
- Philippine Velge as Kate
- Valeria Bruni Tedeschi as David's mother
- Melvil Poupaud as Mr. Lefèvre
- Isabelle Nanty as Alexis's mother
- Laurent Fernandez as Alexis's father
- Aurore Broutin as the social worker
- Bruno Lochet as Bernard
- Yoann Zimmer as Luc
- Antoine Simoni as Chris

== Production ==
In June 2019, it was announced that Félix Lefebvre, Benjamin Voisin and Philippine Velge had joined the cast of the film, with François Ozon directing from a screenplay he wrote. Principal photography began in May 2019 (from 27 May to 21 June).

Shooting took place from 28 May to 26 June 2019 in Tréport in Normandy for the beach, sailing and shop scenes, and in Eu and Yport for the homes of the boys.

The film was shot using Super 16 stock, which Ozon had used for his early short films.

== Release ==
The film was set to premiere at the Cannes Film Festival in May 2020, prior to its cancellation due to the COVID-19 pandemic. It was released in France on 14 July 2020. In September 2020, Music Box Films acquired U.S. distribution rights to the film. It screened at the 2020 Toronto International Film Festival on 13 September 2020. It was released in the United States on 18 June 2021.

== Reception ==
=== Critical reception ===
On review aggregator AlloCiné it has a rating of 3.9/5 based on 33 press reviews. On the review aggregator website Rotten Tomatoes, 81% of 102 critics' reviews are positive. The website's consensus reads: "While not François Ozon's best work, Summer of 85 serves as a beguiling, bittersweet ode to teen love and its lingering after-effects." Metacritic, which uses a weighted average, assigned the film a score of 65 out of 100, based on 24 critics, indicating "generally favorable" reviews.

In his review for Sight and Sound, Alex Ramon states that the film out-classes "the Ozon-derivative Call Me by Your Name (2017), ...in its sensitivity to the boys’ contrasting personalities, family situations and social circumstances, and its unsentimental acknowledgement that falling in love often involves the construction of an idealised image". He notes borrowing from two earlier films; one from a disco scene in La Boum (1980), "with David placing headphones on Alex when they’re on the dancefloor so that another song... fills his ears, and ours", and when David suggests that Alex buy a dress with the same pattern as the one "that liberated the uptight lover in Ozon’s seminal short A Summer Dress".

Ramon, commenting on the film's resemblance to a Künstlerroman as in Ozon's 2012 Dans la maison, commends Voisin for showing "the darker side of David’s charm", Bruni-Tedeschi "characteristically vivid", and Lefebvre, who conveys his awakening understanding of having created an idealized image of his lover; while mentioning Nanty and Fernandez who "provide some of the film’s most affecting, unstressed moments" as Alexis' parents.
