= Music Box Films =

American film distributor

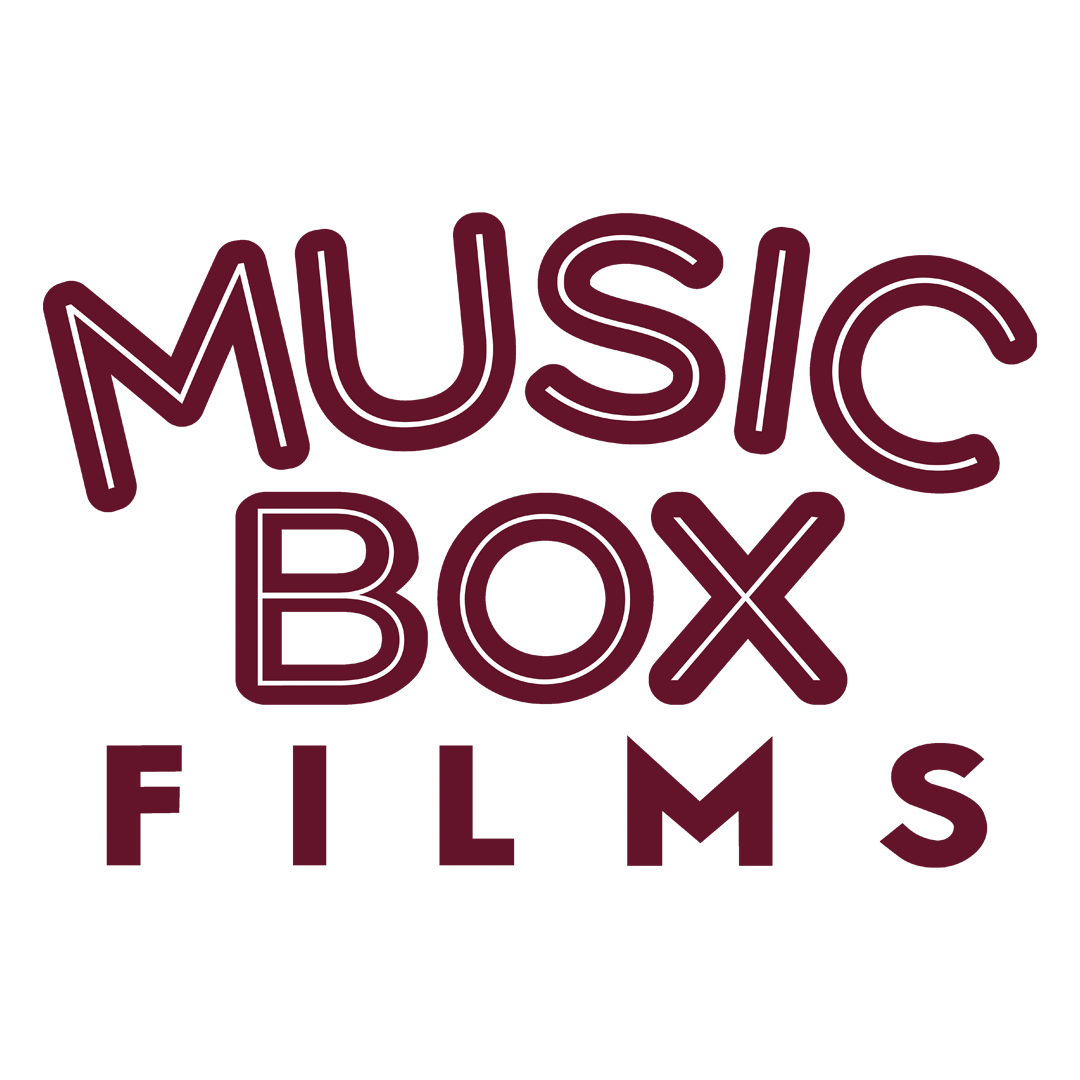
- Industry: Motion pictures
- Founded: 2007
- Headquarters: Chicago, IL, United States
- Parent: Southport Music Box Corporation
- Website: www.musicboxfilms.com

Music Box Films is a distributor of foreign and independent film in theatrical, DVD/Blu-ray, and video-on-demand markets in the United States. Based in Chicago, Music Box Films is independently owned and operated by the Southport Music Box Corporation, which also owns and operates the Music Box Theatre.

Founded in 2007, the company's first releases were Tuya's Marriage, OSS 117: Cairo, Nest of Spies, and Tell No One, the latter of which became a notable foreign-language film success in the United States, grossing over $6,000,000 and becoming the highest-grossing foreign film in the US in 2008.

Past releases include the Swedish film adaptations of Stieg Larsson's Millennium series. Other releases include 2015 Academy Award winner for Best International Feature Film Ida, 2016's A Man Called Ove, the Emily Dickinson biopic A Quiet Passion starring Cynthia Nixon, and Christian Petzold's film Transit.

== Releases ==
Title	Release date
Tuya's Marriage	April 4, 2008
OSS 117: Cairo, Nest of Spies	May 9, 2008
Tell No One	July 2, 2008
Shall We Kiss?	March 27, 2009
Il Divo	April 24, 2009
Seraphine	June 5, 2009
Cloud 9	August 14, 2009
North Face	January 29, 2010
The Girl with the Dragon Tattoo	March 19, 2010
Anton Chekhov's The Duel	April 28, 2010
OSS 117: Lost in Rio	May 7, 2010
The Girl Who Played with Fire	July 11, 2010
The Sicilian Girl	August 4, 2010
Mesrine: Killer Instinct	August 27, 2010
Mesrine: Public Enemy #1	September 3, 2010
Max Manus: Man of War	September 3, 2010
The Girl Who Kicked the Hornet's Nest	October 26, 2010
Potiche	March 18, 2011
Viva Riva!	June 10, 2011
Bride Flight	June 10, 2011
The Names of Love	June 24, 2011
Mysteries of Lisbon	August 10, 2011
Mozart's Sister	August 19, 2011
Gainsbourg: A Heroic Life	August 31, 2011
Young Goethe In Love	November 4, 2011
The Conquest	November 11, 2011
The Heir Apparent: Largo Winch	November 18, 2011
Lads and Jockeys	December 2, 2011
Miss Minoes	December 23, 2011
The Deep Blue Sea	March 23, 2012
Monsieur Lazhar	April 23, 2012
Quill: The Life of a Guide Dog	May 18, 2012
Wallander: The Revenge	May 25, 2012
Marina Abramović: The Artist Is Present	June 13, 2012
Last Ride	June 29, 2012
Hermano	August 24, 2012
Keep the Lights On	September 7, 2012
Snowman's Land	September 14, 2012
Starlet	November 7, 2012
Any Day Now	December 14, 2012
Birders: The Central Park Effect	January 18, 2013
Happy People: A Year in the Taiga	January 25, 2013
Lore	February 8, 2013
The Silence	March 8, 2013
Old Goats	March 15, 2013
Eddie: the Sleepwalking Cannibal	April 5, 2013
Augustine	May 17, 2013
The Wall	May 31, 2013
100 Bloody Acres	June 28, 2013
Smash & Grab: The Story of the Pink Panthers	July 31, 2013
Informant	September 13, 2013
Shepard and Dark	September 25, 2013
Bettie Page Reveals All	November 22, 2013
Black Out	February 21, 2014
Le Week-End	March 14, 2014
Ida	May 2, 2014
Age of Uprising: The Legend of Michael Kohlhaas	May 30, 2014
A Coffee in Berlin	June 13, 2014
The Last Sentence	June 20, 2014
Code Black	June 20, 2014
Jackpot	June 27, 2014
A Five Star Life	July 18, 2014
Fifi Howls from Happiness	August 8, 2014
The Green Prince	September 12, 2014
Watchers of the Sky	October 17, 2014
Revenge of the Mekons	October 29, 2014
The Tower: Tales from a Vanished Land	November 7, 2014
Happy Valley	November 19, 2014
Flamenco, Flamenco	November 21, 2014
Antarctica: A Year on Ice	November 28, 2014
We Are the Giant	December 12, 2014
Beloved Sisters	January 9, 2015
Gett: The Trial of Viviane Amsalem	February 13, 2015
Of Horses and Men	March 11, 2015
Emptying the Skies	April 22, 2015
The Hundred-Year-Old Man Who Climbed Out the Window and Disappeared	May 8, 2015
The Film Critic	May 15, 2015
Gemma Bovery	May 29, 2015
Alleluia	July 17, 2015
Paulo Coelho's Best Story	July 31, 2015
Meru	August 14, 2015
Flowers	October 30, 2015
Censored Voices	November 20, 2015
The Club	February 5, 2016
We Are Twisted F***ing Sister!	February 12, 2016
Francofonia	April 1, 2016
A Monster with a Thousand Heads	May 11, 2016
Therapy for a Vampire	June 10, 2016
The Innocents	July 1, 2016
Norman Lear: Just Another Version of You	July 8, 2016
Mia Madre	August 26, 2016
A Man Called Ove	September 30, 2016
Seasons	November 25, 2016
The Brand New Testament	December 9, 2016
Antarctica: Ice and Sky	January 20, 2017
Frantz	March 15, 2017
A Quiet Passion	April 20, 2017
The Midfwife	July 21, 2017
Manolo: The Boy Who Made Shoes for Lizards	September 15, 2017
Chavela	October 4, 2017
Aida's Secrets	October 20, 2017
The Fencer	January 5, 2018
Vazante	January 12, 2018
Black Code	February 20, 2018
Our Blood is Wine	March 9, 2018
Back to Burgundy	March 23, 2018
My Letter to the World	April 20, 2018
The Guardians	May 4, 2018
Heavy Trip	June 22, 2018
The Captain	July 27, 2018
Memoir of War	August 17, 2018
The Apparation	September 7, 2018
Becoming Astrid	November 23, 2018
Transit	March 1, 2019
Hagazussa: A Heathen's Curse	April 19, 2019
Hesburgh	April 26, 2019
In The Aisles	June 14, 2019
Piranhas	August 2, 2019
Give Me Liberty	August 23, 2019
Gags the Clown	September 3, 2019
Edie	September 6, 2019
Stuffed	October 16, 2019
By The Grace of God	October 18, 2019
And Then We Danced	February 7, 2020
Nomad: In The Footsteps of Bruce Chatwin	April 8, 2020
Eating Up Easter	April 22, 2020
An Enginner Imagines	May 5, 2020
Beats	June 26, 2020
Represent	August 14, 2020
Sibyl	September 11, 2020
The Black Book of Father Dinis	December 8, 2020
Breaking Surface	December 15, 2020
The Perfect Candidate	May 14, 2021
Summer of 85	June 18, 2021
Mama Weed	July 16, 2021
Ema	August 6, 2021
Little Girl	September 17, 2021
Golden Voices	October 8, 2021
Writing with Fire	November 26, 2021
Strawberry Mansion	February 18, 2022
The Rose Maker	April 1, 2022
Lost Illusions	June 10, 2022
Medusa	July 29, 2022
The Story Of Film: A New Generation	September 9, 2022
Please Baby Please	October 28, 2022
Leonor Will Never Die	November 25, 2022
Full Time	February 3, 2023
Rodeo	March 17, 2023
Other People's Children	April 21, 2023
L'immensità	May 12, 2023
Revoir Paris	June 23, 2023
The Unknown Country	July 28, 2023
Fremont	August 25, 2023
My Sailor, My Love	September 22, 2023
The Road Dance	October 13, 2023
The Crime Is Mine	December 25, 2023
Ennio	February 9, 2024
Golden Years	February 23, 2024
Glitter & Doom	March 8, 2024
Relative	May 21, 2024
Solo	May 24, 2024
Just the Two of Us	June 14, 2024
The Nature of Love	July 5, 2024
Mountains	August 16, 2024
In the Summers	September 20, 2024
Daaaaaalí!	October 4, 2024
Rounding	February 14, 2025
Eephus	March 7, 2025
When Fall is Coming	April 4, 2025
The Trouble with Jessica	April 25, 2025
Ghost Trail	May 30, 2025
Familiar Touch	June 20, 2025
Kill the Jockey	July 2, 2025
A Little Prayer	August 29, 2025
The Summer Book	September 19, 2025
Young Mothers	January 9, 2026
By Design	February 13, 2026
Late Shift	March 20, 2026
The Stranger	April 3, 2026
The Last One For The Road	May 1, 2026
