= When Fall Is Coming =

2024 film directed by François Ozon

- Theatrical release poster
- French: Quand vient l'automne
- Directed by: François Ozon
- Written by: François Ozon
- Produced by: François Ozon
- Starring: Josiane Balasko; Garlan Erlos; Hélène Vincent; Ludivine Sagnier; Pierre Lottin
- Cinematography: Jérome Alméras
- Edited by: Anita Roth
- Music by: Evgueni Galperine; Sacha Galperine
- Production companies: FOZ; France 2 Cinéma; Playtime
- Distributed by: Diaphana Distribution
- Release dates: 9 September 2024 (Cosne-Cours-sur-Loire); 2 October 2024 (France)
- Running time: 102 minutes
- Country: France
- Language: French
- Budget: €4.8 million
- Box office: $7 million

When Fall Is Coming (French: Quand vient l'automne), released in the UK and Ireland as When Autumn Falls, is a 2024 French drama film written, produced and directed by François Ozon.

== Premise ==
In a quaint Burgundy village, longtime friends and neighbours Michelle and Marie-Claude enjoy a quiet post-retirement lifestyle. Michelle looks forward to spending the summer with her grandson, Lucas, but his stay is cancelled when Michelle accidentally serves his mother poisonous mushrooms. Initially dejected, Michelle begins to feel less lonely when Marie-Claude's son returns home from prison.

== Cast ==
- Josiane Balasko as Marie-Claude Perrin
- Garlan Erlos as Lucas Tessier
- Hélène Vincent as Michelle Giraud
- Ludivine Sagnier as Valérie Tessier
- Pierre Lottin as Vincent Perrin
- Sophie Guillemin as the police captain
- Malik Zidi as Laurent Tessier
- Paul Beaurepaire as Lucas Tessier (age 18)
- Sidiki Bakaba as the priest
- Pierre Le Coz as the brigadier
- Michel Masiero as Bernard
- Vincent Colombe as Michelle's doctor
- Marie-Laurence Tartas as the hospital doctor
- Adam O.H. as the church child

== Release ==
When Fall Is Coming had its public premiere in Cosne-Cours-sur-Loire on 9 September 2024, and received a market screening at the 2024 Toronto International Film Festival later the same day.

It was later screened at the San Sebastián International Film Festival, in competition for the Golden Shell. The film was released in France on 2 October 2024.

The film had its U.S. premiere at the 36th Palm Springs International Film Festival. Music Box Films gave the film a limited theatrical release in the United States beginning on 4 April 2025.

Parkland Pictures released the film in the UK and Ireland on 21 March 2025, under the title When Autumn Falls.

== Reception ==
=== Critical reception ===
The film holds a 97% approval rating on review aggregator Rotten Tomatoes, based on 64 critic reviews. The website's critics consensus reads, "Director François Ozon deftly walks a tonal tightrope with When Fall is Coming, a darkly funny thriller given genuine humanity by Hélène Vincent." On Metacritic, the film holds a weighted average score of 74/100 based on 11 critics, indicating "generally favorable" reviews.

=== Accolades ===
Award	Ceremony date	Category	Recipient	Result	Ref.
San Sebastián International Film Festival	28 September 2024	Golden Shell	When Fall is Coming	Nominated	
San Sebastián International Film Festival	28 September 2024	Silver Shell for Best Supporting Performance	Pierre Lottin	Won	
San Sebastián International Film Festival	28 September 2024	Best Screenplay	François Ozon	Won	
