= Carême (TV series) =

French television series

- Promotional poster
- Genre: Historical drama Political drama
- Based on: Cooking for Kings: The Life of Antonin Carême, The First Celebrity Chef by Ian Kelly
- Screenplay by: Ian Kelly; Davide Serino
- Directed by: Martin Bourboulon
- Starring: Benjamin Voisin; Lyna Khoudri; Jérémie Renier
- Country of origin: France
- Original language: French
- No. of seasons: 1
- No. of episodes: 8

Production
- Executive producers: Vanessa van Zuylen; Dominique Farrugia
- Production companies: VVZ Production; Shine Fiction

Original release
- Network: Apple TV+
- Release: April 30, 2025 – present

Carême is a French-language historical drama television series produced for Apple TV+ about Napoleonic-era celebrity chef Antonin Carême. It has Martin Bourboulon as a director. The cast is led by Benjamin Voisin, Lyna Khoudri and Jérémie Renier. It premiered globally on 30 April 2025. Apple announced a second season in September 2026.

== Premise ==
The biographical television series follows the life of Antonin Carême, who rises from humble beginnings to become known as one of the world's first celebrity chefs during the Napoleonic era. However, his newfound celebrity places him in the gaze of politicians who want to use him as a spy.

== Cast ==
- Benjamin Voisin as Marie-Antoine Carême
- Alice Da Luz as Agathe Guichardet
- Lyna Khoudri as Henriette Sophie Mahy de Chitenay
- Jérémie Renier as Charles-Maurice de Talleyrand-Périgord
- Franck Molinaro as Napoleon Bonaparte
- Maud Wyler as Josephine de Beauharnais
- Lily Taïeb as Hortense de Beauharnais

== Episodes ==
No.	Title	Original release date
1	"The Infernal Machine"	April 30, 2025
2	"Blackmail"	April 30, 2025
3	"A Recipe for a Disaster"	May 7, 2025
4	"Buy the Crown!"	May 14, 2025
5	"The Contest"	May 21, 2025
6	"Trompe l'oeil"	May 28, 2025
7	"Confession"	June 4, 2025
8	"The Coronation"	June 11, 2025

== Production ==
The eight-part French-language television series is directed by Martin Bourboulon and was commissioned by Apple TV+ in June 2023. It is inspired by the book Cooking for Kings: The Life of Antonin Carême, The First Celebrity Chef by Ian Kelly, and was created by Kelly and Davide Serino. It is executive produced by Vanessa van Zuylen for VVZ Production and Dominique Farrugia for Banijay's Shine Fiction.

The cast is led by Benjamin Voisin as Marie-Antoine Carême, and also includes Lyna Khoudri as his lover, Henriette, and Jérémie Renier as diplomat Charles-Maurice de Talleyrand-Périgord.

Season 2 began production in October 2026.

== Release ==
Carême premiered globally on 30 April 2025 on Apple TV+.

== Reception ==
On the review aggregator website Rotten Tomatoes, Carême holds an approval rating of 95% based on 19 reviews. The website's critics consensus reads, "Savory as a well-judged soufflé, Carême is a twisty confection that makes 19th-century spycraft a rousing and seductive viewing experience. Metacritic, which uses a weighted average, assigned the series a score of 74 out of 100 based on 12 critics, indicating "generally favorable reviews".

Phil Harrison for The Guardian described it as a "glossy" and "melodramatic and frequently risque telling of an enjoyably wild story".

Ian Kelly, the author of the source material, in The Daily Telegraph described the series as "garlanded with glamour, royalty and vast historical panoramas...not a documentary".
