= Pierre Lottin =

French actor (born 1989)

- Born: 20 June 1989 (age 37); Issy-les-Moulineaux, France
- Occupation: Actor

Pierre Lottin (French pronunciation: [pjɛʁ lɔtɛ̃]; born 20 June 1989) is a French actor. He won the César Award for Best Supporting Actor in 2026 for The Stranger.

== Early life and education ==
As a teenager, Lottin helped his father run a bakery in Louvois, Marne. He left home at age 15 and began working as a waiter at La Coupole before studying drama at the Cours Florent.

== Career ==
In 2007, Lottin began acting in short films. He appeared in his first feature film, Les Tuche, in 2011, and reprised the role of Wilfried Tuche in each of the film's sequels.

Lottin's first collaboration with director Emmanuel Courcol, the prison drama The Big Hit, debuted in 2020. He starred alongside Benjamin Lavernhe in Courcol's film The Marching Band, which premiered at the 2024 Cannes Film Festival. Lottin also appeared in François Ozon's drama When Fall Is Coming, released in 2024.

== Partial filmography ==
=== Film ===
Key
†	Denotes films that have not yet been released

Year	Title	Role	Notes	Ref.
2011	Les Tuche	Wilfried Tuche	—N/a	
2011	Bad Seeds	Eric Delcourt	—N/a	
2012	Pieces of Me	Young man with a dog	—N/a	
2016	Les Tuche 2	Wilfried Tuche	—N/a	
2018	Les Tuche 3	Wilfried Tuche	—N/a	
2018	By the Grace of God	Didier	—N/a	
2019	La bataille du rail	Franck	—N/a	
2019	The Breitner Commando	Alexis Martillat	—N/a	
2020	The Big Hit	Jordan Fortineau	—N/a	
2020	Playlist	Jean	—N/a	
2021	Présidents	Balthazar	—N/a	
2021	Les Tuche 4	Wilfried Tuche	—N/a	
2021	Notre-Dame on Fire	Lieutenant Alexandre	—N/a	
2022	The Night of the 12th	Vincent Caron	—N/a	
2022	Harkis	Lieutenant Krawitz	—N/a	
2023	On the Pulse	Alex	—N/a	
2024	The Marching Band	Jimmy Lecocq	—N/a	
2024	In Custody	Bresson	—N/a	
2024	When Fall Is Coming	Vincent Perrin	—N/a	
2025	The Stranger	Raymond Sintès	—N/a	

=== Television ===
Year	Title	Role	Notes	Ref.
2020	Vampires (TV series)	Rad Radescu	6 episodes	
2023	Polar Park	Ulrich Becherel	6 episodes	
