= Sidonie in Japan =

2023 film by Élise Girard

- French theatrical release poster
- French: Sidonie au Japon
- Directed by: Élise Girard
- Written by: Élise Girard; Maud Ameline; Sophie Fillières
- Produced by: Sébastien Haguenauer
- Starring: Isabelle Huppert; Tsuyoshi Ihara; August Diehl
- Cinematography: Céline Bozon
- Edited by: Thomas Glaser
- Music by: Gérard Massini
- Production companies: 10:15! Productions; Lupa Film; Box Productions; Fourier Films; Film-in-Evolution; Mikino; Les Films du Camélia
- Distributed by: Art House Films (France); Majestic Filmverleih (Germany)
- Release dates: 1 September 2023 (Venice); 3 April 2024 (France); 11 July 2024 (Germany)
- Countries: France; Germany; Switzerland; Japan
- Languages: French; English; Japanese
- Box office: $1.4 million

Sidonie in Japan (French: Sidonie au Japon) is a 2023 romantic drama film co-written and directed by Élise Girard, starring Isabelle Huppert, Tsuyoshi Ihara and August Diehl. It follows a middle aged French widow and writer traveling to Japan.

The film had its world premiere in the Giornate degli Autori section of the 80th Venice International Film Festival on 1 September 2023. It was theatrically released in France on 3 April 2024 by Art House Films.

== Premise ==
Established French writer Sidonie Perceval mourns her late husband, Antoine, while traveling to Japan for a reedition of her first book. While there, she begins an affair with her mysterious Japanese publisher, Kenzo, while the ghost of her husband begins appearing.

== Cast ==
- Isabelle Huppert as Sidonie
- Tsuyoshi Ihara as Kenzo Mizoguchi
- August Diehl as Antoine

== Production ==
Girard drew inspiration for the film from her first trip to Japan that she made to promote her 2011 film Belleville-Tokyo. The film is a co-production of France, Germany, Switzerland and Japan. It is one of the last works of co-writer Sophie Fillières, who died two months before its premiere.

== Release ==
Sidonie in Japan had its world premiere in the Giornate degli Autori section of the 80th Venice International Film Festival on 1 September 2023. The film was released theatrically in France on 3 April 2024 by Art House Films and in Germany on 11 July 2024 by Majestic Filmverleih.

== Reception ==
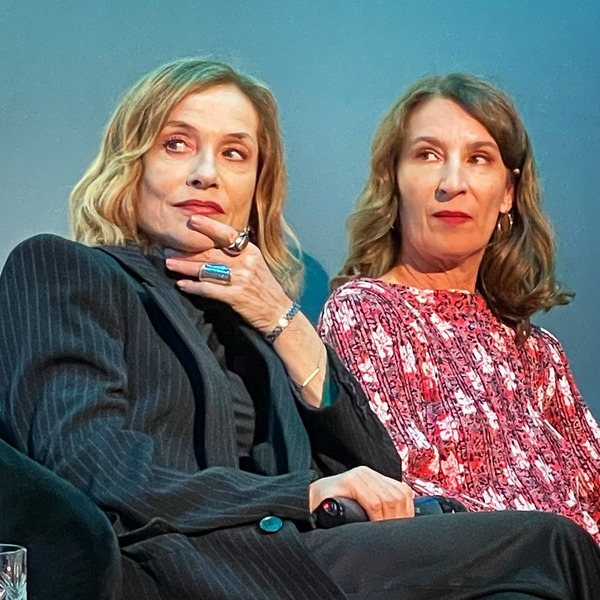
Isabelle Huppert and Élise Girard present the film at 41st International Film Festival in Munich, Germany, on 30 June 2024

On the review aggregator website Rotten Tomatoes, 56% of 9 critics' reviews are positive.
