= The Stranger (2025 film) =

2025 film by François Ozon

- French theatrical release poster
- French: L'Étranger
- Directed by: François Ozon
- Screenplay by: François Ozon
- Based on: The Stranger (1942 novel) by Albert Camus
- Produced by: François Ozon
- Starring: Benjamin Voisin; Rebecca Marder; Pierre Lottin; Denis Lavant; Swann Arlaud
- Cinematography: Manu Dacosse
- Edited by: Clément Selitzki
- Music by: Fatima Al Qadiri
- Production companies: FOZ; Gaumont; France 2 Cinéma; Macassar Productions; Scope Pictures
- Distributed by: Gaumont
- Release dates: 2 September 2025 (Venice); 29 October 2025 (France)
- Running time: 122 minutes
- Countries: France; Belgium
- Language: French
- Box office: $9 million

The Stranger (French: L'Étranger) is a 2025 drama film written and directed by François Ozon, based on Albert Camus' 1942 novel. Benjamin Voisin stars in the lead role of Meursault, alongside Rebecca Marder, Pierre Lottin, Swann Arlaud and Denis Lavant. It is the third film adaptation of Camus' novel, following the 1967 Italian film and the 2001 Turkish film.

The film had its world premiere in the main competition of the 82nd Venice International Film Festival on 2 September 2025, where it was nominated for the Golden Lion. It was theatrically released in France by Gaumont on 29 October. It was a critical and commercial success. At the 51st César Awards, Lottin won Best Supporting Actor, and Voisin was nominated for Best Actor.

== Plot ==
In French Algeria, Meursault lives a life of indifference and detachment. Following the death of his mother, he stands accused of the murder of an Arab man.

== Cast ==
- Benjamin Voisin as Meursault
- Rebecca Marder as Marie Cardona
- Pierre Lottin as Raymond Sintès
- Denis Lavant as Salamano
- Swann Arlaud as the Priest
- Mireille Perrier as Mother
- Christophe Malavoy
- Nicolas Vaude
- Jean-Charles Clichet
- Hajar Bouzaouit as Djemila

== Background ==
The film is an adaptation of Albert Camus's 1942 novella The Stranger, about a detached and indifferent Frenchman in French Algeria, who, weeks after his mother's funeral, kills an unnamed Arab man in Algiers. The ensuing trial explores both the crime and his character. It is considered a landmark work of existentialism and is widely regarded as Camus's masterpiece. It is also ranked as one of the most widely read French novels in the world and has been translated into 75 languages. A 1967 film adaptation by Italian filmmaker Luchino Visconti starred Marcello Mastroianni as Meursault. A 2001 film adaptation by Turkish filmmaker Zeki Demirkubuz loosely reworked the novel, transposing it to contemporary Istanbul.

== Production ==
In March 2025, Benjamin Voisin was announced in the principal role. Ozon produced the film through his own company FOZ, in co-production with Gaumont, France 2 Cinéma, Macassar Productions and Belgium's Scope Pictures. Principal photography began in Morocco in April 2025, at which time Rebecca Marder, Pierre Lottin, Swann Arlaud and Denis Lavant were announced to have joined the cast.

== Release ==
The Stranger was selected to compete for the Golden Lion at the 82nd Venice International Film Festival, where it had its world premiere on 2 September 2025.

In April 2025, international sales were acquired by Gaumont. In May 2025, the company presented the film at the Marché du Film in Cannes to be acquired by distributors around the world. Gaumont was scheduled to theatrically release the film in France on 29 October 2025. Music Box Films acquired US distribution rights, and was released there in April 2026. The film was also released in the United Kingdom in April 2026.

== Reception ==
=== Box office ===
The film had 752k admissions at the French box office, grossing $9 million.

=== Critical response ===
On the review aggregator website Rotten Tomatoes, 89% of 35 critics' reviews are positive. Metacritic, which uses a weighted average, assigned the film a score of 84 out of 100, based on 17 critics, indicating "universal acclaim".

Damon Wise for Deadline writes that the film "is a perfectly crafted but somewhat laborious stab at the book's dark heart."

== Accolades ==
Award	Date of ceremony	Category	Recipient(s)	Result	Ref.
Venice Film Festival	6 September 2025	Golden Lion	François Ozon	Nominated	
Lumière Awards	18 January 2026	Best Film	The Stranger	Won	
Lumière Awards	18 January 2026	Best Director	François Ozon	Nominated	
Lumière Awards	18 January 2026	Best Actor	Benjamin Voisin	Won	
Lumière Awards	18 January 2026	Best Screenplay	François Ozon	Nominated	
Lumière Awards	18 January 2026	Best Cinematography	Manuel Dacosse	Won	
Lumière Awards	18 January 2026	Best Music	Fatima Al Qadiri	Nominated	
César Awards	26 February 2026	Best Actor	Benjamin Voisin	Nominated	
César Awards	26 February 2026	Best Supporting Actor	Pierre Lottin	Won	
César Awards	26 February 2026	Best Cinematography	Manuel Dacosse	Nominated	
César Awards	26 February 2026	Best Original Music	Fatima Al Qadiri	Nominated	
