= Benjamin Voisin =

French actor (born 1996)

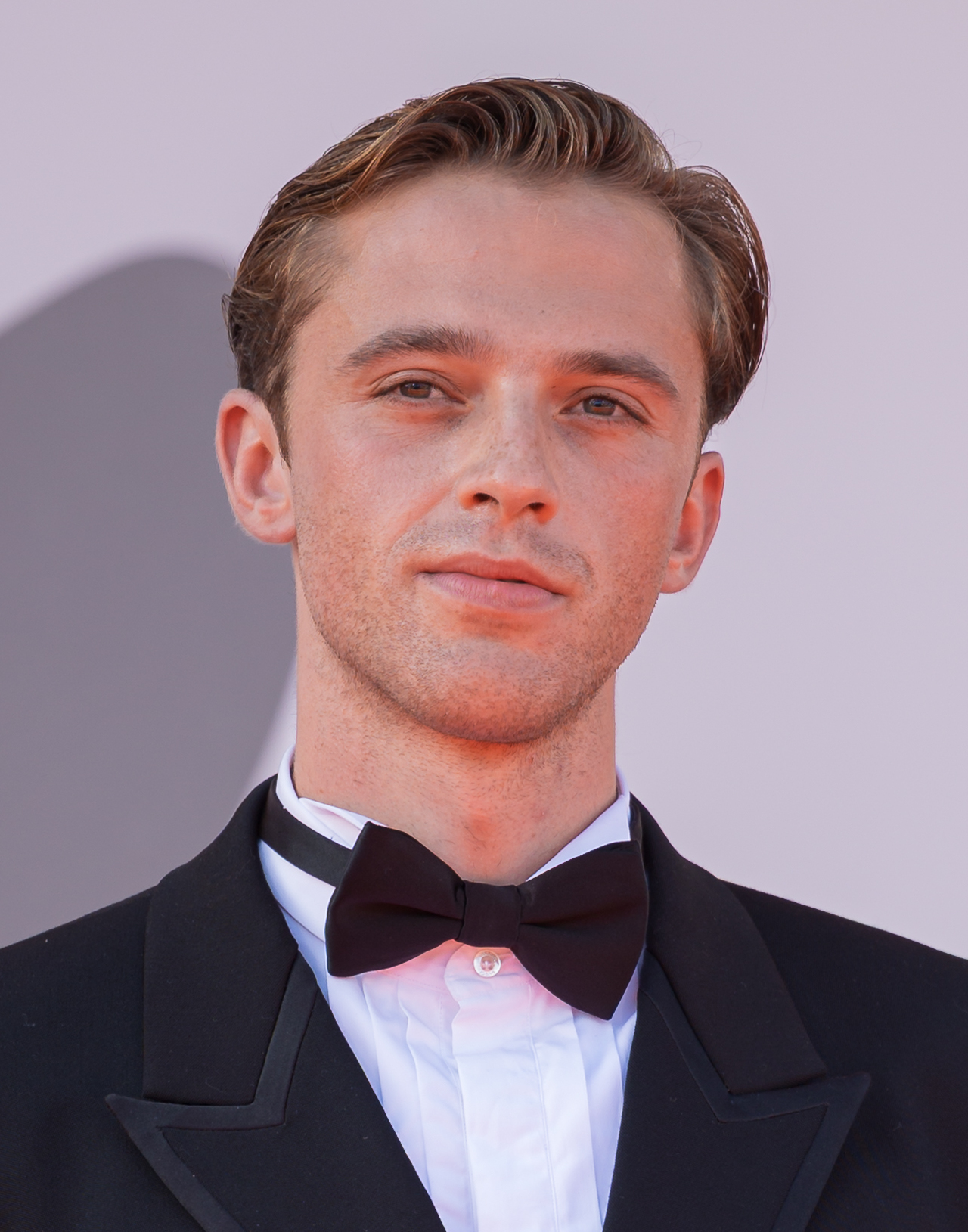
- Voisin at 82nd Venice International Film Festival
- Born: 14 December 1996 (age 29); Paris, France
- Occupation: Actor
- Years active: 2015–present

Benjamin Voisin (born 14 December 1996) is a French actor. For his role as David Gorman in the 2020 drama film Summer of 85, he shared the Lumière Award for Best Male Revelation with his co-star Félix Lefebvre, and was nominated for the César Award for Most Promising Actor.

== Biography ==
Benjamin Voisin was born in December 1996 in Paris. His father, Marc Voisin, is a teacher at the Cours Florent, and his mother is an accountant. He studied at the Lycée Claude-Bernard in the 16th arrondissement of Paris, where he grew up. He pursued drama studies at the Cours Florent, which he first joined in 2011 to attend youth workshops for three years. He then joined the acting programme in his second year. He also joined the Conservatoire national supérieur d'art dramatique in 2017, a year after passing the competitive exam in 2016.

== Filmography ==
=== Film ===
Key
| † | Denotes films that have not yet been released |

| Year | Title | Role | Notes |
|---|---|---|---|
| 2015 | Adèle | | short |
| 2017 | Peru | Vincent | Short film |
| 2017 | Bonne Pomme | Thomas | |
| 2018 | The Happy Prince | Jean | |
| 2018 | Death in the Soul | Alex Lagnier | Television film |
| 2018 | Falling for Love | Kévin | Television film |
| 2019 | Simon's Got a Gift | Simon | |
| 2019 | Man Up! | Léo | |
| 2020 | Summer of 85 | David Gorman | |
| 2021 | Lost Illusions | Lucien de Rubempré | |
| 2021 | The Mad Women's Ball | Théophile Cléry | |
| 2022 | En roue libre | Paul | |
| 2023 | Soul Mates | David Faber | |
| 2024 | Game Changers | Paul | |
| 2024 | The Quiet Son | Fus | |
| 2025 | The Stranger | Meursault | |
| 2026 | Forty Love † | | |

=== Television ===
| Year | Title | Role | Notes |
|---|---|---|---|
| 2016 | Emma | Mathieu Fournier | |
| 2018 | Fiertés | Victor | |
| 2025 | Carême | Marie-Antoine Carême | |

== Theatre ==
| Year | Title | Director | Notes |
|---|---|---|---|
| 2014 | Autour du rêve | | L'auditorium du conservatoire Jean-Philippe Rameau |
| 2016 | Les êtres en quêtes | | |
| 2016 | Débris | Laure Frappier | Ciné 13 Théâtre |
| 2017 | Un Dom Juan | Benjamin Voisin | Théâtre des 2 Galeries |
| 2023 | Guerre | Benoît Lavigne | Théâtre du Chêne Noir, Théâtre du Petit-Saint-Martin |
| 2025 | Guerre | Benoît Lavigne | Théâtre de l'Œuvre |
