= Dance on My Grave =

1982 novel by Aidan Chambers

- First edition cover
- Author: Aidan Chambers
- Language: English
- Series: Dance Sequence
- Genre: Young adult literature
- Publisher: The Bodley Head
- Publication date: 1982
- Publication place: United Kingdom
- Media type: Print (paperback)
- Pages: 256
- ISBN: 978-0-370-30366-6
- Preceded by: Breaktime
- Followed by: Now I Know

Dance on My Grave is a 1982 young adult novel by British author Aidan Chambers. Its full title is Dance on My Grave: a life and a death in four parts, one hundred and seventeen bits, six running reports and two press clippings, with a few jokes, a puzzle or three, some footnotes and a fiasco now and then to help the story along. It is the second book in Chambers's six-novel Dance Sequence series.

It tells the story of a British teenager named Hal Robinson, detailing the events that led to his dancing on the grave of his slightly older friend, Barry Gorman, with whom Hal had a love affair.

It was one of the first few young adult books published by a major publisher that depicts homosexuality without being judgmental, and was included on ALA's and other libraries' list of books for gay teens. It has also been referred to in a number of books on children and young adult literature.

Because of its gay-positive theme, it was challenged at the Montgomery County Memorial Library System in 2004 by the Library Patrons of Texas.

== Plot ==
Hal is a sixteen-year-old with a fascination with death and is unsure of his plans for the future. On a boating trip he accidentally capsizes, but is rescued by Barry Gorman, who takes him to his home to dry off. Hal quickly falls in love with Barry, seeing him as a person that brings direction and enjoyment into his life.

Barry invites him to work at his family's music store, as well as to trips to the movie theater and motorcycle riding. Barry brings up Hal's interest in death, telling him that one should confront death by laughing at it. He makes Hal agree to an oath that whichever one of them shall die first, the other shall dance on his grave. Though confused, Hal agrees to the oath and kisses Barry. Their relationship becomes intimate.

One day, Hal catches Barry flirting with a girl, Kari. He confronts Barry, who replies that whatever relationship Hal assumed was between them was over. Pressed further, Barry says that Hal wanted too much from him and that he was bored. Hal leaves angrily. He later learns that Barry had died in a motorcycle accident after he chased after him.

Distraught by Barry's death, Hal feels the urge to see Barry's body. Kari helps him sneak into the morgue, where the sight of the body reminds Hal of his oath. The first time he visits Barry's grave, he is overcome by anger and is unable to dance on his grave. Kari explains to Hal that the reason for his anger was that he over-depended on Barry for excitement; he preferred the idea of Barry rather than who he was. Hal returns to Barry's grave and dances on it, but is caught by a police officer and charged for the crime of damaging a grave.

A social worker tries to get Hal to explain himself so he won't be charged heavily in court. Hal initially refuses to talk, but later writes a full account of his relationship with Barry and submits it to the court. He is not charged with a crime. Hal decides to continue his education in order to let things settle. He promises to move on with his life, to not let his past control his future.

== Translations ==
Dance on My Grave has been translated into at least 9 other languages in both Asia and Europe.

== Film adaptation ==
The book was the basis of the film Summer of 85 (Été 85) by French director François Ozon in 2020.
