= Victor (1993 film) =

- Directed by: François Ozon
- Written by: Nicolas Mercier; François Ozon
- Starring: François Genty; Isabelle Journeau; Jean-Jacques Forbin; Laurent Labasse; Martine Erhel; Daniel Martinez
- Cinematography: Sylvia Calle
- Distributed by: F.E.M.I.S.
- Release date: 1993
- Running time: 14 minutes
- Country: France
- Language: French

Victor is a French short film released in 1993, written by Nicolas Mercier and François Ozon, directed by Ozon, and starring François Genty.

== Plot ==
Victor is a young man of good breeding, who keeps his dead parents in the bedroom of their sumptuous family cottage. The new status quo opens the door for new discoveries.

== Cast ==
- François Genty
- Isabelle Journeau
- Jean-Jacques Forbin
- Laurent Labasse
- Martine Erhel
- Daniel Martinez
