= Good Girl (film) =

2005 film by Sophie Fillières

- Directed by: Sophie Fillières
- Starring: Emmanuelle Devos; Lambert Wilson
- Release date: 14 September 2005 (TIFF)
- Running time: 1h 42min
- Country: France
- Language: French

Good Girl (French: Gentille) is a 2005 French comedy film directed by Sophie Fillières.

== Cast ==
- Emmanuelle Devos - Fontaine Leglou
- Lambert Wilson - Philippe Philippe
- Bruno Todeschini - Michel Strogoff
- Michael Lonsdale - Jean
- Bulle Ogier - Angèle
- Julie-Anne Roth - Cléia
- Nicolas Briançon - Jean-Jacques
- Michel Vuillermoz - Le docteur Gudarzi
