= Simon's Got a Gift =

2019 French film

- Directed by: Léo Karmann
- Written by: Léo Karmann; Sabrina B. Karine
- Produced by: Grégoire Debailly
- Starring: Benjamin Voisin; Martin Karmann
- Cinematography: Julien Poupard
- Edited by: Olivier Michaut-Alchourroun
- Music by: Erwann Chandon
- Production companies: A-Motion; Geko Films; Wrong Men North; Belga Productions; Région Bretagne
- Release date: 24 August 2019 (FFA)
- Running time: 103 min
- Country: France
- Language: French

Simon's Got a Gift (French: La dernière vie de Simon) is a 2019 French drama film directed by Léo Karmann.

== Cast ==
- Benjamin Voisin as Simon
- Martin Karmann as Thomas Durant
- Camille Claris as Madeleine Durant
- Nicolas Wanczycki as Jacques Durant
- Julie-Anne Roth as Agnès Durant
