= This Life of Mine (2024 film) =

2024 film by Sophie Fillières

- Theatrical release poster
- French: Ma vie ma gueule
- Directed by: Sophie Fillières
- Written by: Sophie Fillières
- Produced by: Julie Salvador
- Starring: Agnès Jaoui
- Cinematography: Emmanuelle Collinot
- Edited by: François Quiqueré
- Music by: Philippe Katerine
- Production company: Christmas in July
- Distributed by: Jour2Fête
- Release dates: 15 May 2024 (Cannes); 18 September 2024 (France)
- Running time: 99 minutes
- Country: France
- Language: French
- Box office: $1 million

This Life of Mine (French: Ma vie ma gueule) is a 2024 French comedy-drama film written and directed by Sophie Fillières. It was Fillières's final film after her death in 2023.

It had its world premiere as the opening film of the Directors' Fortnight section at the 77th Cannes Film Festival on 15 May 2024. It was theatrically released on 18 September 2024 by Jour2Fête.

== Premise ==
Barbie travels to the Scottish Highlands on a journey of self-discovery.

== Cast ==
- Agnès Jaoui as Barberie "Barbie" Bichette
- Angélina Woreth as Rose
- Édouard Sulpice as Junior
- Philippe Katerine as Katerine Philippe
- Valérie Donzelli as The Sister
- Laurent Capelluto as Bertrand Blanc
- Isabelle Candelier (voice) as The Friend on the Phone
- Emmanuel Salinger as Doctor Radjabov
- Maxence Tual as Doctor Boulin

== Production ==
This Life of Mine is the seventh feature directed by Sophie Fillières, who died in July 2023 shortly after completing the shoot of the film. She was hospitalised after the shoot and realised she would not survive the illness. She asked Agathe and Adam Bonitzer, her children with Pascal Bonitzer, and her producer Julie Salvador to oversee the post-production. A month after her death, Agathe and Adam assisted Francois Quiqueré in editing the film and used notes that their mother had written while in the hospital.

Fillières wrote the film's screenplay five years earlier. In the production notes, she insisted that the protagonist Barbie was not autobiographical in nature. However, the lead actress Agnès Jaoui commented that she often felt that she was portraying Fillières. During the production, she was made to wear the director's own clothes and her rings. The role of the therapist was portrayed the Fillières's real-life psychologist of 30 years.

Salvador produced the film through her Paris-based company Christmas in July.

== Release ==
The film was selected to be screened as the opening film of the Directors' Fortnight section at the 77th Cannes Film Festival, where it had its world premiere on 15 May 2024. It won the SACD Authors' Favorite Prize (Coup de cœur des auteurs SACD de la Quinzaine des Cinéastes), an award for best French-language film in the section, presented by France's Société des Auteurs et Compositeurs Dramatiques.

The film was released in France on 18 September 2024 by Jour2Fête, with the company's sales arm The Party Film Sales handling world sales for the film.

== Reception ==
=== Critical response ===
On AlloCiné, the film received an average rating of 3.9 out of 5 stars, based on 25 reviews from French critics. On the review aggregator website Rotten Tomatoes, 89% of 9 critics' reviews are positive, with an average rating of 6/10.

=== Accolades ===
Award	Date of ceremony	Category	Recipient(s)	Result	Ref.
Cannes Film Festival	25 May 2024 (Note: The SACD Authors' Favorite Prize was awarded on 23 May 2024.)	SACD Authors' Favorite Prize	Sophie Fillières	Won	
Louis Delluc Prize	4 December 2024	Best Film	This Life of Mine	Nominated	
