= Now I Know (novel) =

1987 book by Aidan Chambers

- First edition
- Author: Aidan Chambers
- Language: English
- Series: Dance Sequence
- Genre: Young adult literature
- Publisher: The Bodley Head
- Publication date: 1987
- Publication place: United Kingdom
- Media type: Print (paperback)
- Pages: 237
- ISBN: 978-0-370-30773-2
- Preceded by: Dance on My Grave

Now I Know is a young adult novel by Aidan Chambers, first published in 1987. It is a meditation on faith and religion through three interlinked stories, which are told by means of letters, jottings, flashbacks, poetry and puzzles. The novel is part of the author's Dance Sequence, a group of novels which stand alone but can be read in relation to each other.

As part of Chambers' interest in experimental writing, he refers to Tom Phillip's work A Humument: a Treated Victorian Novel (Thames & Hudson, 1980), a modern work that is created from the pages of an actual Victorian novel by painting over most of the words of the original, creating illustrations and decorations, while leaving enough of the original words on each page to tell a total new story. Chambers includes a similar experimental collage-like page of image and text.

== Plot summary ==
Nik, a seventeen-year-old boy, is inspired to study the relationship of Christianity to contemporary life when he is chosen to play Jesus Christ in a film project. Tom is investigating the mystery of a body found hanging from a scrapyard crane. Julie is in hospital, bandaged from head to foot.

== Bibliography ==
- Chambers, Aidan. Now I Know, Harper & Row, 1987. ISBN 0-06-021209-8
- Chambers, Aidan. Now I Know, The Bodley Head (reprint), 1987. ISBN 978-0-370-30773-2
- Chambers, Aidan. Now I Know, Amulet Books, 2009. ISBN 978-0-8109-8353-3
