= Sophie Fillières =

French film director and screenwriter (1964–2023)

- Born: 20 November 1964; Paris, France
- Died: 31 July 2023 (aged 58)
- Occupations: Film director, screenwriter
- Spouse: Pascal Bonitzer
- Children: Agathe Bonitzer
- Relatives: Hélène Fillières (sister)

Sophie Fillières (20 November 1964 – 31 July 2023) was a French film director and screenwriter who wrote for more than fifteen film and television productions from 1991 on.

Fillières died on 31 July 2023, at the age of 58, after ending the shoot of her last film, This Life of Mine.

== Filmography ==
Short film

Year	Title	Director	Writer
1991	Des filles et des chiens	Yes	Yes
2006	Nathalie Moretti...	Yes	Yes
2006	Antoine et Sidonie	Yes	Yes

TV writer

Year	Title	Notes
1993	Cuentos de Borges	1 episode
2011	E-love	TV movie

Feature film

Year	Title	Director	Writer
1994	Grande petite	Yes	Yes
1994	Oublie-moi	No	Yes
1998	Sombre	No	Yes
2000	Aïe	Yes	Yes
2003	A Man, a Real One	No	Yes
2005	Gentille	Yes	Yes
2009	Un chat un chat	Yes	Yes
2011	Early One Morning	No	Yes
2011	Le secret de l'enfant-fourmi	No	Yes
2012	Nuts	No	Yes
2014	If You Don't, I Will	Yes	Yes
2014	Weekends in Normandy	No	Yes
2023	Sidonie in Japan	No	Yes
2024	This Life of Mine	Yes	Yes

Acting roles

Year	Title	Role
2016	In Bed with Victoria	Sophie
2023	Anatomy of a Fall	Monica

== Awards and nominations ==
Year	Title	Award/Nomination
1991	Des filles et des chiens	Clermont-Ferrand International Short Film Festival - Special Mention of the Jury; Prix Jean Vigo - Short Film
1994	Oublie-moi	Thessaloniki International Film Festival - Best Screenplay
2011	E-love	SACD Award for TV New Talent Award
2014	If You Don't, I Will	Nominated - Chicago International Film Festival - Audience Choice Award; Nominated - Sarasota Film Festival - Narrative Feature Competition Winner
