= Signal: Approaches to Children's Books =

100th edition of Signal

Signal: Approaches to Children's Books was an independent journal about literature for children. It was founded by Nancy and Aidan Chambers in 1970 and ran until 2003. In 1980 it was the subject of an anthology by Nancy Chambers titled The Signal Approach to Children's Books, A Collection. It was described by Peter Hunt in The Oxford Encyclopedia of Children's Literature as "one of the outstanding journals in its field, with a reputation for integrity, accessibility, and innovation". It produced an annual review volume titled The Signal Review of Children's Books.

In 2016, Seven Stories - The National Centre for Children's Books, acquired the Aidan and Nancy Chambers archive including the records of the production of Signal.
