= Breaktime (novel) =

Book by Aidan Chambers

- First edition
- Author: Aidan Chambers
- Language: English
- Series: Dance Sequence
- Genre: Young adult literature
- Publisher: The Bodley Head
- Publication date: 1978
- Publication place: United Kingdom
- Media type: Print (paperback)
- Pages: 138
- ISBN: 0-370-30122-6
- Followed by: Dance on My Grave

Breaktime is a young adult novel by Aidan Chambers. The book follows Ditto who debates with his friend Morgan about the value of literature, but has to retreat for a week to sort things out.

The novel has been described as "famous for its unique narrative style and sexual content", and its narrative techniques have been compared to those of James Joyce's Ulysses.

== Reception ==
Kirkus Reviews praised "the ease with which Chambers adapts modernist experimental techniques and post-modernist plays on the conventions of fiction to an accessible YA level", and noted that Ditto was a "candid reporter, alert and responsive come-what-may".
