= Félix Lefebvre =

French actor

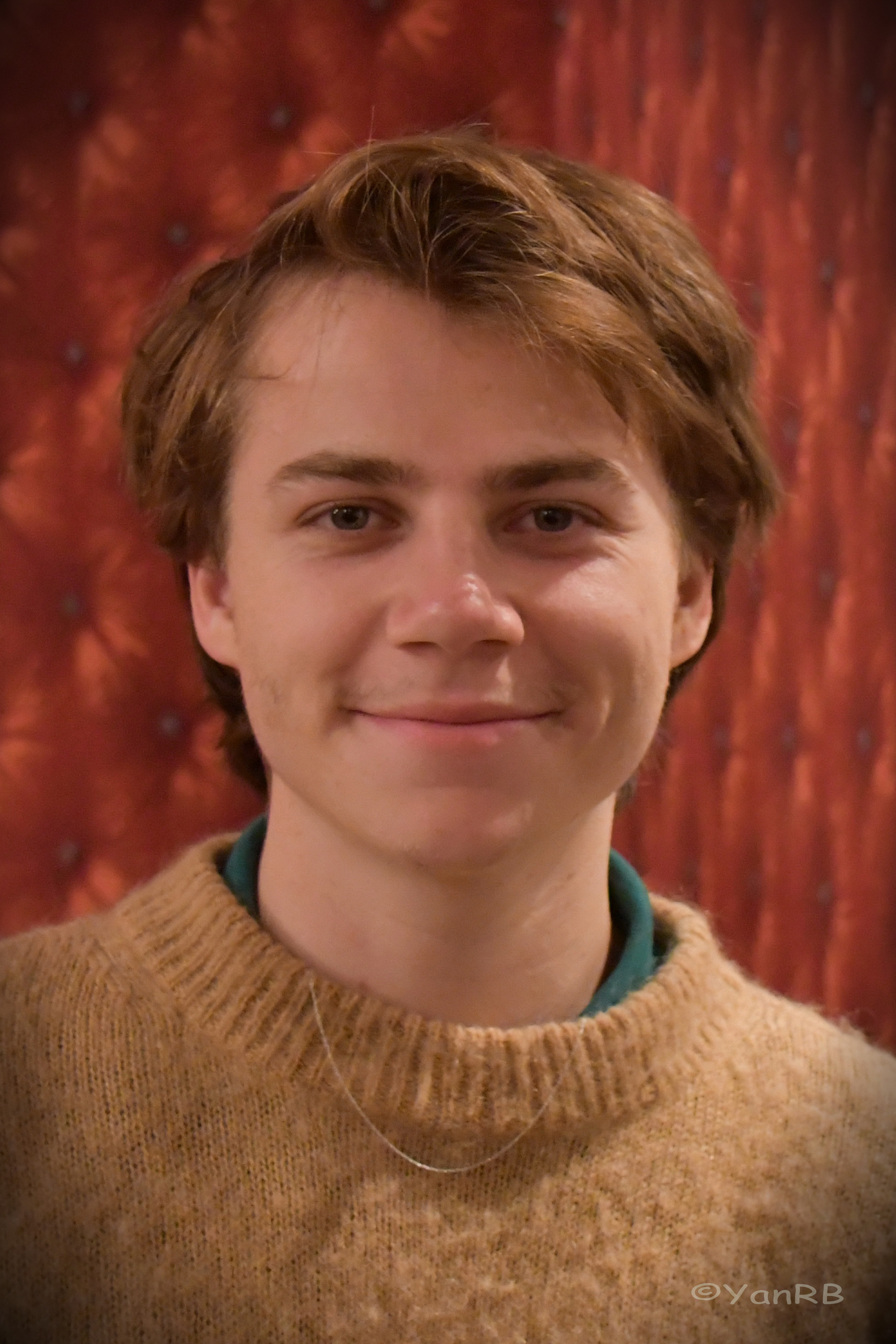
- Lefebvre in 2022
- Born: November 19, 1999 (age 26); Saint-Maurice, France
- Education: Cours Florent (classe libre)
- Occupation: Actor
- Years active: 2017–present
- Parent(s): Brigitte Pouletty-Lefebvre, Didier Lefebvre

Félix Lefebvre (born November 19, 1999) is a French actor. For his role as Alexis Robin in the dramatic film Summer of 85, he was nominated for the César Award for Most Promising Actor in 2021.

== Biography ==
Félix Lefebvre was born in 1999 and spent his childhood in Antony (Hauts-de-Seine). His father is a painter and musician. After obtaining his Baccalauréat, he entered the Conservatory of Paris’s 8th arrondissement and then studied at the Cours Florent.

== Filmography ==
=== Film ===
Year	Title	Role	Notes
2018	Les temps d'hiver	Gabriel	Short film
2018	School's Out	Paulin	
2019	Magie noire	Louis	Short film
2019	When Comes The Night	François	Short film
2020	Une nuit, à travers champs	Dylan	
2020	Summer of 85 (Eté 85)	Alexis Robin	
2021	Suprêmes	Sebastién Farran	
2022	La passagère	Maxence	
2023	The Crime Is Mine (Mon Crime)	Gilbert Raton	
2023	All to Play For (Rien à perdre)	Jean-Jacques Paugam	
2024	Ni chaînes ni maîtres	Honoré Larcenet	
2024	Somewhere In Love (Une vie Revée)	Serge Boussy	
2024	J'ai avalé une chenille	Tristan (Narrator)	Short animated film
2025	Le Domaine	Damien	
2025	L'epreuve du feu	Hugo	
2025	Dans la boue		Short film
2026	La dernière patiente		
2026	Microstar	Stanislas	
2026	Moulin	Martin	

=== Television ===
Year	Title	Role	Notes
2017	Section de recherches	Romain Mariani	1 episode
2017–2018	The Chalet	Julien Rodier	5 episodes
2018	Piégés	Xavier Gaillard	Television film
2019	Infidèle	Luigi	6 episodes
2020	Le Diable au Coeur	Alex	Television film
