= The Toll Bridge =

1992 novel by Aidan Chambers

- First edition
- Author: Aidan Chambers
- Language: English
- Genre: Young adult literature
- Publisher: The Bodley Head
- Publication date: 1992
- Publication place: United Kingdom
- Media type: Print (paperback)
- Pages: 195
- ISBN: 978-0-370-31526-3

The Toll Bridge is a young adult novel by Aidan Chambers.

Seventeen-year-old Piers leaves home to be a toll bridge keeper. He meets Tess and Adam.

Piers is trying to escape the pressures of suffocating parents and a possessive girlfriend. Adam is a charismatic wayfarer who shows up one day and refuses to leave. Piers also befriends a girl named Tess. He and Tess find themselves strangely attracted to Adam and fall under his spell. The three test their sexuality and the bonds of their friendship as they discover who they are — and aren't — in a harrowing course of events that leaves all three wondering if they can ever really know anyone. Like the other books in Chambers' Dance Sequence, The Toll Bridge can be read alone or as part of the series.

== Bibliography ==
- The Toll Bridge, The Bodley Head, 1992, ISBN 978-0-370-31526-3; Laura Geringer Book, 1995. ISBN 978-0-06-023599-4; reprint Red Fox, 1995, ISBN 978-0-09-950311-8; Amulet Books, 2009, ISBN 978-0-8109-8358-8
