= Keep an Eye Out =

Keep an Eye Out!
- Film poster
- French: Au poste !
- Directed by: Quentin Dupieux
- Written by: Quentin Dupieux
- Produced by: Mathieu Verhaeghe; Thomas Verhaeghe
- Starring: Benoît Poelvoorde; Grégoire Ludig
- Cinematography: Quentin Dupieux
- Edited by: Quentin Dupieux
- Music by: David Sztanke
- Production companies: Atelier de Production; Cinéfrance; Nexus Factory; Umedia
- Distributed by: Diaphana Distribution (France)
- Release date: 4 July 2018 (France)
- Running time: 73 minutes
- Countries: France; Belgium
- Language: French
- Box office: $2 million

Keep an Eye Out! (French: Au poste!) is a 2018 French surreal black comedy film written and directed by Quentin Dupieux. It stars Benoît Poelvoorde and Grégoire Ludig, alongside Marc Fraize, Anaïs Demoustier, Philippe Duquesne and Orelsan, in a story that involves a commissaire de police and a suspect in an interrogation room. This is Dupieux's first film shot in France. The film's French title literally means "To the police station!".

The film was released on 4 July 2018 in French theatres by Diaphana Distribution and on 5 March 2021 in U.S. theatres by Dekanalog. It received positive reviews from critics.

== Plot ==
In a large office, Commissaire Buron, after having had a telephone discussion, continues the questioning of the man who is seated in front of him, named Fugain, without allowing him to take a break to eat. Considered the prime suspect, Fugain discovered a man bathed in his blood outside his home. He searched the pockets of the corpse before calling for help, which surprised Buron who insisted on resuming the interrogation.

Buron goes out for a few moments to talk with his son and takes the opportunity to eat a hot dog. Meanwhile, Philippe, a novice one-eyed policeman, is tasked with monitoring Fugain. Philippe agrees to strike up a conversation and wants to show Fugain his police badge. He stumbles over an open drawer and falls dead, his one eye pierced by a square he held in his hand. Fugain, panicked, hides the body in a cupboard and quickly wipes away the traces of blood.

Buron returns and continues the interrogation. According to her testimony, Fugain's neighbor says she saw him leave her home seven times during the night. Watching the closet, Fugain explains in detail what he did during the night. Buron listens to him while smoking. As smoke comes out of his right side, he explains that he has a hole in his chest. A little later, Philippe's wife announces to Buron that she is pregnant and is looking for her husband. Fugain lies and says he left because of a stomach ache. Like her husband, she makes it a habit to punctuate her sentences with "That's why", which annoys Buron.

During the interrogation, Fugain's memories mingle with reality. He sees Philippe, with the square planted in his eye, appear in his memories and interact with him. A little later, Fugain also sees Philippe's wife. He tells her that he will meet her and her husband a few days later during his interrogation and that Philippe will die accidentally. Later, Fugain complains of being hungry. Buron, annoyed to see Fugain complaining, tells him that he too was very hungry for three days when his helicopter crashed on a desert island. Fugain sees Buron on the beach, which surprises Buron, not seeing anything. He ends up giving Fugain an oyster that a colleague has brought him. Fugain, having never eaten an oyster before, crunches the shell instead of swallowing it.

During Fugain's last memory, Buron appears in his apartment and interacts with him. After hearing screams, they leave the apartment and Buron notices the strange resemblance between Fugain's spy neighbor and one of his colleagues. Once outside, Buron asks Fugain to reconstruct the scene where he discovers the victim's body. Back to the reality, Champonin, a colleague of Buron, brings the forensic report: the man found dead by Fugain was the victim of a "digestive hemorrhage". It's an accident and therefore Fugain expects to be released. Before leaving the room, Champonin finds an eye on the ground and deduces that it is Philippe's.

Fugain tries to explain himself but at the same time, the curtain opens: the police station is in fact the stage of a theater. The audience stands up and applauds, the characters salute. Moreover, Philippe, still alive, comes out of the closet and takes off his disguise; he is not one-eyed. They are all actors, except Fugain who believed he was really suspected of murder. They go to have dinner together in a brewery, evoke their acting and the first critics which fall. Leaving the restaurant, Fugain, still confused, thanks Buron for this experience. Buron regains his seriousness and handcuffs Fugain, announcing that the interrogation will resume in the morning. Fugain is brought back to the police station and Buron returns home.

== Cast ==
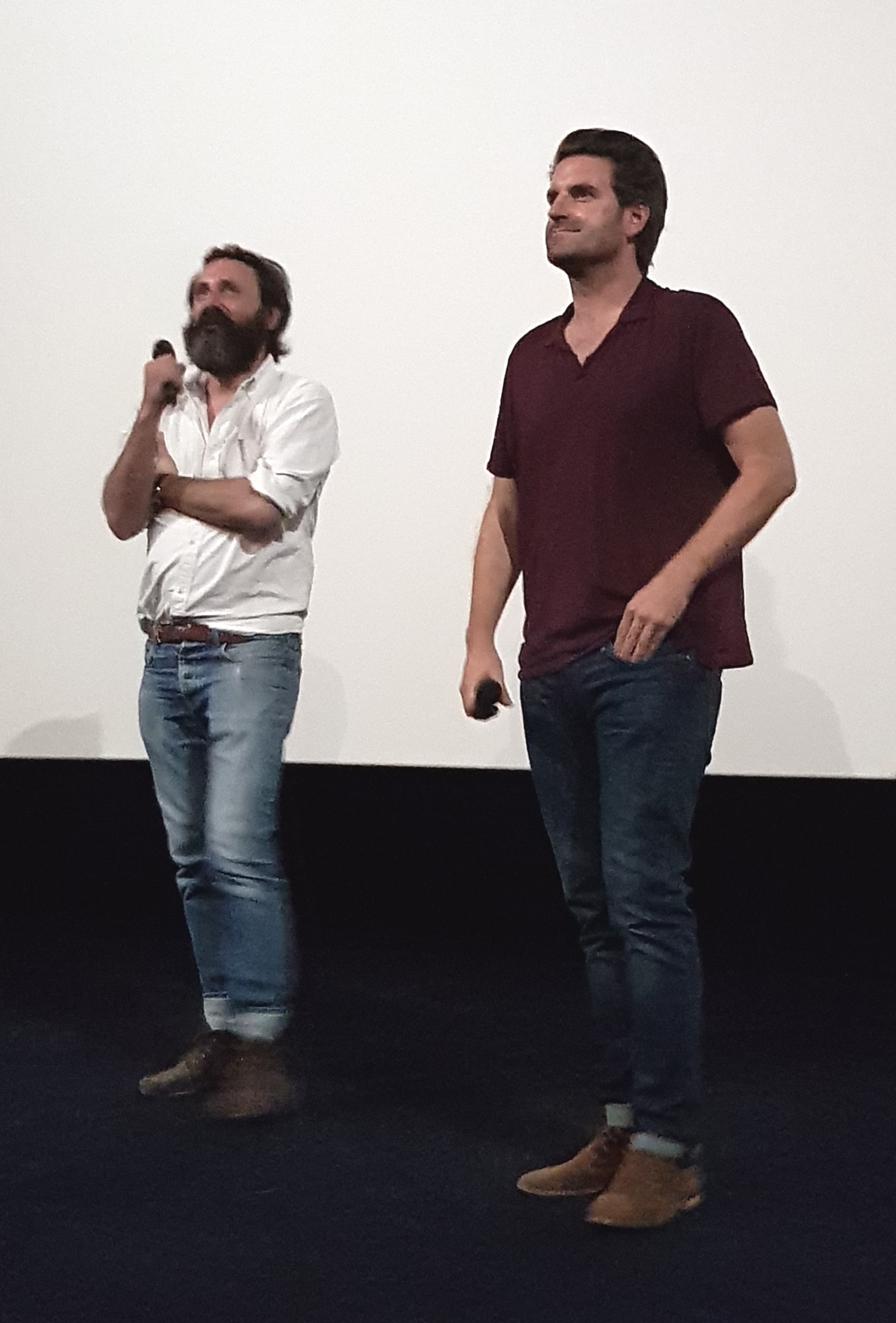
Quentin Dupieux and Grégoire Ludig, at the film's premiere

- Benoît Poelvoorde as Commissaire Buron
- Grégoire Ludig as Louis Fugain, the suspect
  - Nahel Ange as Louis Fugain (aged 7)
- Marc Fraize as Philippe, beginner one-eyed policeman and Fiona's husband.
- Anaïs Demoustier as Fiona, Philippe's wife.
- Philippe Duquesne as Champonin, a colleague of Buron.
- Orelsan as Sylvain, Buron's son.
- Jacky Lambert as Franchet / Carine Lustain, a colleague of Buron.
- Jeanne Rosa as Narta
- Vincent Grass as Daniel, the housekeeper.
- July Messéan as Louise
- Johnny Malle as Corpse of Chevalet
- Laurent Nicolas as Conductor
- Michel Hazanavicius as Cop #1
- Pedro Winter as Cop #2
- Alain Chabat as Screams of pain (voice cameo). Dupieux said in the film's audio commentary that it was a reference to Chabat's role in his previous film Reality.

== Production ==
=== Casting ===
Initially planned for Albert Dupontel, the role of Commissaire Buron is finally interpreted by Benoît Poelvoorde. Before accepting the role, he didn't know Quentin Dupieux. He accepted the role following his reading of the script which he described as one of the best he has read in his career. Dupieux contacted Grégoire Ludig on Twitter to offer him to play the role of Fugain.

=== Music ===
The music for the film was composed by David Sztanke. Sztanke, also known as Tahiti Boy, has already worked with Dupieux on the soundtrack of Wrong, released in 2012. Unlike Dupieux's previous films, the film contains almost no music. Dupieux wanted to give priority to dialogue and voices for the film because he considered that putting music in the background was a contradiction.

== Reception ==
=== Critical reception ===
On review aggregation website Rotten Tomatoes, the film holds an approval rating of 88% based on 43 reviews, with an average rating of 7.4/10. The website's critics consensus reads, "For viewers tuned into Quentin Dupieux's frequently absurd wavelength, Keep an Eye Out offers another delightfully off-kilter triumph." Metacritic assigned a weighted average score of 64 out of 100, based on 8 critics, indicating "generally favorable reviews". The French cinema site AlloCiné gave the film a rating of 3.8/5 stars based on 30 reviews.

Writing for The Hollywood Reporter, Jordan Mintzer said that "Like Dupieux's other movies Keep an Eye Out is chock full of bizarre happenings that don't really add up to much but are nonetheless well orchestrated and amusing to watch." On the side of French critic reviews, Renan Cros of CinemaTeaser said "The result speaks for itself: we leave this closed door with the improbable impression of having taken a big, very big, breath of fresh air. Absurd? No, Dupieux." Sophie Rosemont of Rolling Stone said that "Au poste ! is a well-executed black comedy, which navigates between tension, suspense and humour, calls French cinema to order."

=== Accolades ===
Year	Award	Category	Recipient(s)	Result	Ref(s)
2018	2018 Sitges Film Festival	Best Screenplay	Au poste!	Won	
2019	9th Magritte Awards	Best Actor	Benoît Poelvoorde	Nominated	
