= Like a Prince =

2023 French film by Ali Marhyar

- Theatrical release poster
- French: Comme un prince
- Directed by: Ali Marhyar
- Written by: Ali Marhyar; Julien Guetta
- Starring: Ahmed Sylla; Julia Piaton; Mallory Wanecque; Habib Dembélé; Tewfik Jallab; Jérémie Laheurte; Igor Gotesman; Jonathan Lambert; Cécile Bois
- Cinematography: Noémie Gillot
- Edited by: Jessica Menendez; Samuel Danesi
- Music by: Bonjour Meow
- Production companies: Issa!Films; Quad Films; France 3 Cinéma; Orange Studio
- Distributed by: Orange Studio / Apollo Films
- Release dates: 23 October 2023 (Montpellier Mediterranean Film Festival); 17 January 2024 (France)
- Running time: 90 minutes
- Country: France
- Language: French

Like a Prince (French: Comme un prince) is 2023 French comedy film directed by Ali Marhyar in his feature directorial debut, from a screenplay he co-wrote with Julien Guetta, starring Ahmed Sylla, Julia Piaton and Mallory Wanecque. The film had its world premiere at the Montpellier Mediterranean Film Festival on 23 October 2023, and was released theatrically in France by Orange Studio and Apollo Films on 17 January 2024.

== Plot ==
Souleyman is a young boxing champion and is preparing for the next Olympic Games with the French team, but an injury sustained during an altercation puts an end to his dreams. Souleyman is kicked out of the team and is sentenced to community service at the Château de Chambord. There he meets Melissa, a teenage girl with an innate talent for boxing, and he decides to train her and attempt a comeback at his own boxing career.

== Cast ==
- Ahmed Sylla as Souleyman
- Julia Piaton as Eddy
- Mallory Wanecque as Melissa
- Habib Dembélé as Alassane
- Tewfik Jallab as Karim
- Jérémie Laheurte as Jérôme
- Jonathan Cohen as Gomez
- Igor Gotesman as Jean-Louis Coton
- Jonathan Lambert as Bertrand
- Cécile Bois as Madame Ledoux
- Malika Azgag as Lamia
- Antoine Gouy as Pedro
- Olivier Rosemberg as Olivier
- Stefan Godin as José

== Production ==
=== Development ===
Like a Prince is actor Ali Marhyar's first feature film as a director. Marhyar is a big fan of boxing and films about this sport. He started boxing at 17 and dreamed of being an Olympic champion. The screenplay was co-written by Marhyar and Julien Guetta. The film was co-produced by Issa!Films, Quad Films, France 3 Cinéma and Orange Studio. The score was composed by Bonjour Meow.

Marhyar originally wanted to play the protagonist, but he did not want to direct and act at the same time, until co-writer Julien Guetta encouraged him to direct the project, so Marhyar decided to just direct the film. For the main role, the director immediately thought of Ahmed Sylla for his comedic qualities, but also "for his deep sensitivity", Marhyar said.

More than three hundred young girls auditioned for the role of Melissa. The film's casting director had seen an interview with Mallory Wanecque during the Cannes Film Festival and she passed the tests. According to Marhyar, Wanecque was the obvious choice for the role because she spoke the same way he had heard the character's voice while he was writing the script.

Ahmed Sylla began a diet and physical preparation well before filming to establish a credibility in the role of a boxer. The actor trained with brothers Aziz and Ali Hallab in the boxing club BAM l'Héritage des Mureaux, where Marhyar himself had practiced boxing. Sylla gained around ten kilos of muscle to shape his body like that of a high-level boxer. Wanecque also trained boxing in the same club to familiarize herself with the choreography of the fights.

In Like a Prince, Marhyar collaborates with several of his former co-stars and co-writing partners, such as Julia Piaton, with whom he had co-starred in the series Family Business (2019–2021), Igor Gotesman, with whom he had worked in Five (2016) and Casting(s) (2013–2015), and with Jonathan Cohen after Budapest (2018), Family Business and La Flamme (2020).

=== Filming ===
Filming took place between Paris, Les Mureaux, and at the Château de Chambord between 4 October 2022 and 18 November 2022.

== Release ==
The film had its world premiere at the Montpellier Mediterranean Film Festival on 23 October 2023. It was released theatrically in France by Orange Studio and Apollo Films on 17 January 2024.

== Reception ==
=== Critical response ===
AlloCiné, a French cinema site, gave the film an average rating of 2.7/5, based on a survey of 14 French reviews.
