= Jonathan Lambert (actor) =

French actor

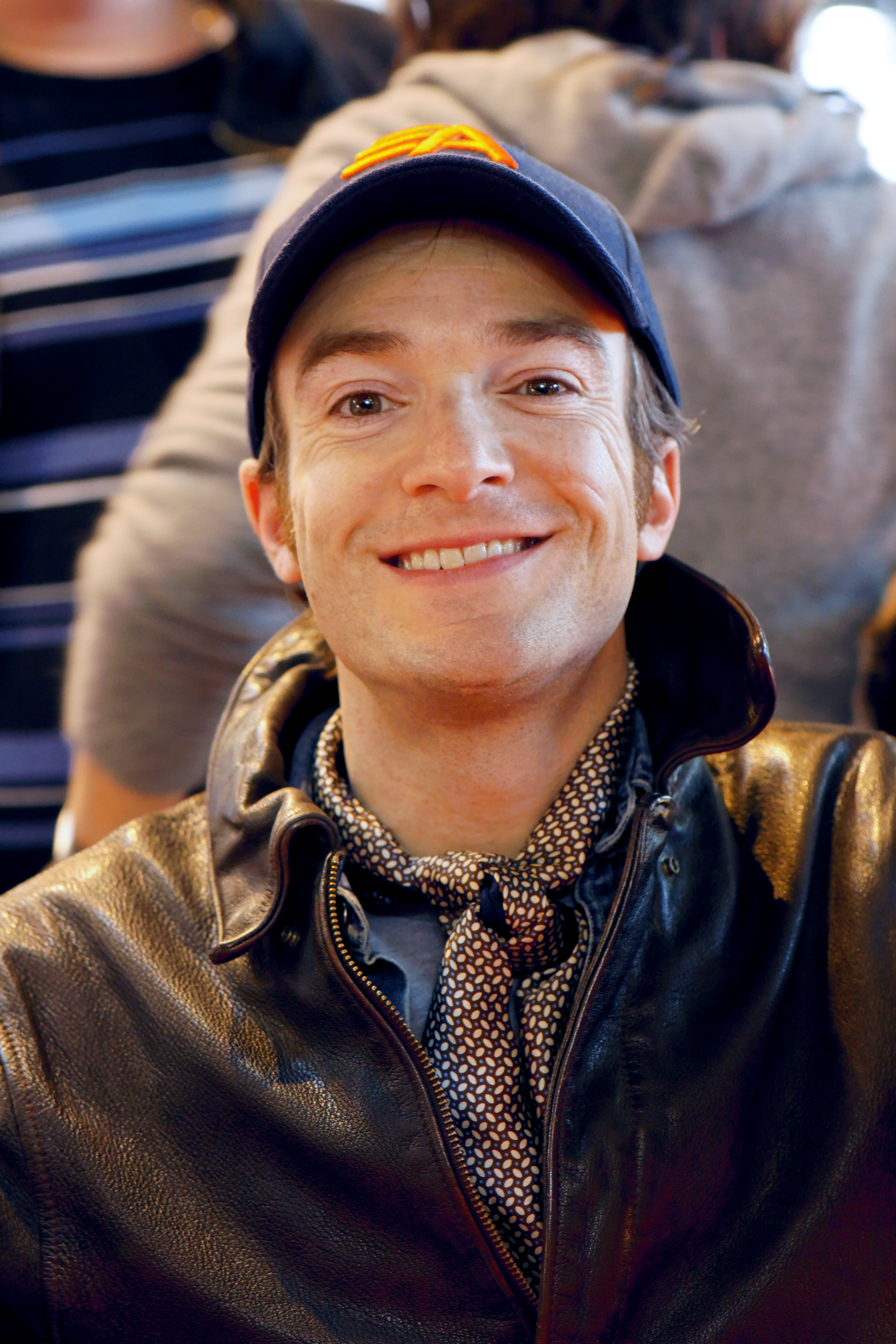
- Lambert in 2011
- Born: 24 June 1973 (age 52); Paris, France
- Occupation: Actor
- Years active: 1999–present
- Spouse(s): Laureen Lambert (m.1997-present, 3 children)

Jonathan Lambert (born 24 June 1973) is a French actor and comedian.

== Filmography ==
Year	Title	Role	Director	Notes
1999	La grosse émission II, le retour	Various	Virginie Lovisone	TV show
2000	La grosse émission III	Various	Virginie Lovisone	TV show
2001	Jeu de cons	The Young Cop	Jean-Michel Verner	
2002	22 minutes chrono	Mr. Pringle	Dominique Farrugia	TV series
2003–04	Samedi soir en direct	Various	Dominique Farrugia, Éric Toledano and Olivier Nakache	TV series
2005	Let's Be Friends	Totof	Éric Toledano and Olivier Nakache	
2005	Un truc dans le genre	Iksangak Ejresse	Alexandre Ciolek	
2005	Palais royal!	The nurse	Valérie Lemercier	
2007	Steak	Serge	Quentin Dupieux	
2007	Un autre monde	The Man	David Haddad	Short
2008	Hero Corp	Bat Man	Simon Astier & Sébastien Lalanne	TV series (1 episode)
2009	La loi de Murphy	Doctor Moreau	Christophe Campos	
2009	Une dernière pour la route		Yves Mérillon	Short
2010	L'amour, c'est mieux à deux	Ariel	Dominique Farrugia & Arnaud Lemort	
2010	Protéger & servir	Champenard	Éric Lavaine	
2010	Le pas Petit Poucet	The Minstrel	Christophe Campos	TV movie
2011	L'amour dure trois ans	Pierre	Frédéric Beigbeder	
2011	Soulwash	The Buyer	Douglas Attal	Short
2011	À la maison pour Noël	Léonard	Christian Merret-Palmair	TV movie
2012	Dépression et des potes	William	Arnaud Lemort	
2012	Le Romancier Martin		Jérôme Foulon	TV mini-series
2012	Fais pas ci, fais pas ça	Roberto Taquet	Gabriel Julien-Laferrière	TV series (2 episodes)
2014	Reality	Bob Marshall	Quentin Dupieux	
2014	Calomnies	Dimitri	Jean-Pierre Mocky	
2015	Les Bêtises	Fabrice Burdini	Alice & Rose Philippon	
2015	Monsieur Cauchemar		Jean-Pierre Mocky	
2015	Peplum	Maximus	Philippe Lefebvre	TV series (3 episodes)
2016	L'Idéal		Frédéric Beigbeder	
2016	The African Doctor	Lavigne	Julien Rambaldi	
2023	Like a Prince	Bertrand	Ali Marhyar	
2025	Flush	Lue	Grégory Morin	Won Audience Award at the Fantasia
