= Nadir Dendoune =

French-Algerian-Australian journalist and writer

Nadir Dendoun
- Born: 7 October 1972 (age 53); Saint-Denis
- Citizenship: Algeria, France, Australia
- Occupation(s): writer, journalist

Nadir Dendoun (Arabic: نذير دندون; born on 7 October 1972 in Saint-Denis, France) is a French-Algerian writer/journalist. He is the author of "A Loser on Top of the World", (French: Un tocard sur le toit du monde) 2010, which was adapted to the cinema in the film The Climb (French: L'Ascension), starring Ahmed Sylla.

Nadhir Dendoun holds French, Algerian and Australian citizenships.

== Career ==
Dendoun was born in Saint-Denis in 1972 to Algerian parents. His father, Mohand Dendoune, arrived in France in 1950, and he settled there in 1957 permanently with his wife Messaouda and their two daughters. In Seine-Saint-Denis, the family first lived in a slum, before moving to social housing in Maurice-Thorez in 1968.

On 25 May 2008, Dendoun was able to reach the summit of Mount Everest, without any experience in mountaineering, and at the same time, he became the first French Algerian to reach the summit of Everest. His journey was narrated in a book that was adapted for the cinema in 2017, and the starring role was played by Ahmed Sylla.

In his autobiographical book "Our dreams are for the poor", (Original title: Nos rêves de pauvres) 2017, he puts his parents, whom he honors, at his story. A picture of his father adjusting his tie is on the cover of the book.

In 2018, he directed a documentary, "Figs in April" (French: Des figues en Avril), to honor his eighty-year-old mother, Messaouda Dendoune, in exile. She's been learning to live on her own since her sick husband who died in 2019 was placed in an elderly home. The documentary's title refers to his mother's astonishment to see figs growing in April in Australia. After watching this documentary, Director Maïwenn offered Messaouda Dendoune to participate in her 2020 film DNA (French: ADN).

== His activities ==
His first adventure was his travel to Australia in 1993, and he roamed the entire area on a distance of 3000 kilometers by bicycle for a period of three months. His admiration for this country led him to return the following year and settle in Sydney until 2001, where he obtained Australian citizenship. He concluded his stay with a trip around the world on a bicycle with financial and advertising coverage from the Australian Red Cross to promote global efforts to combat AIDS.

In March 2003, he went down in Iraq to serve as a human shield to protect a water treatment plant in Baghdad in the face of threats from the international coalition forces. On 23 January 2013, he was arrested and taken to Baghdad Central Prison by the Iraqi authorities, while he was taking a picture of the water treatment plants south of Baghdad, on a press mission for the newspaper Le Monde diplomatique. On 14 February 2013, after 23 days in prison, he was released in exchange for financial bail, and he recorded the events of that adventure in a book entitled "A Peaceful Man's War Diary" (French: Journal de guerre d'un pacifiste).

Dendoun is known for his struggle for the Palestinian cause, on 24 September 2012, Dendoun provoked reactions in the French media after he was a guest on the "Le Grand Journal" program, on Canal+ Channel, and he showed up in a T-shirt with word "Palestine," a word that didn't appear throughout the program, as the director and photographers of the program avoided showing him in a complete picture. And his appearance was limited to the upper part only using zoom technology, which Dendoun considered that he was a victim of channel censorship.

On 25 March 2008, he was the first Algerian to reach Mount Everest and hang his country's flag on it. He also carried a number 93, a reference to the French department of Seine-Saint-Denis where he was born and commonly associated with immigration from north and sub Saharan Africa and with high crime rate.

== His works ==
Books

- A Peaceful Man's War Diary, (French: Journal de guerre d'un pacifiste), 2005 (ISBN 2-9509327-6-2).
- An open letter to the son of an immigrant, (French: Lettre ouverte à un fils d'immigré), 2007 (ISBN 2-35123-135-X).
- A loser on the roof of the world (French: Un tocard sur le toit du monde), 2010 (ISBN 978-2-7096-3437-3).
- Our dreams are for the poor, (Original title: Nos rêves de pauvres), 2017 (ISBN 978-2-7096-4387-0).

Films

- Palestine 2010.
- The case of Salah Hamouri (French: L'Affaire Salah Hamouri) 2016.
- Figs in April 2018 (French: Des figues en Avril).
