= Château de Chambord =

Castle in Chambord, France

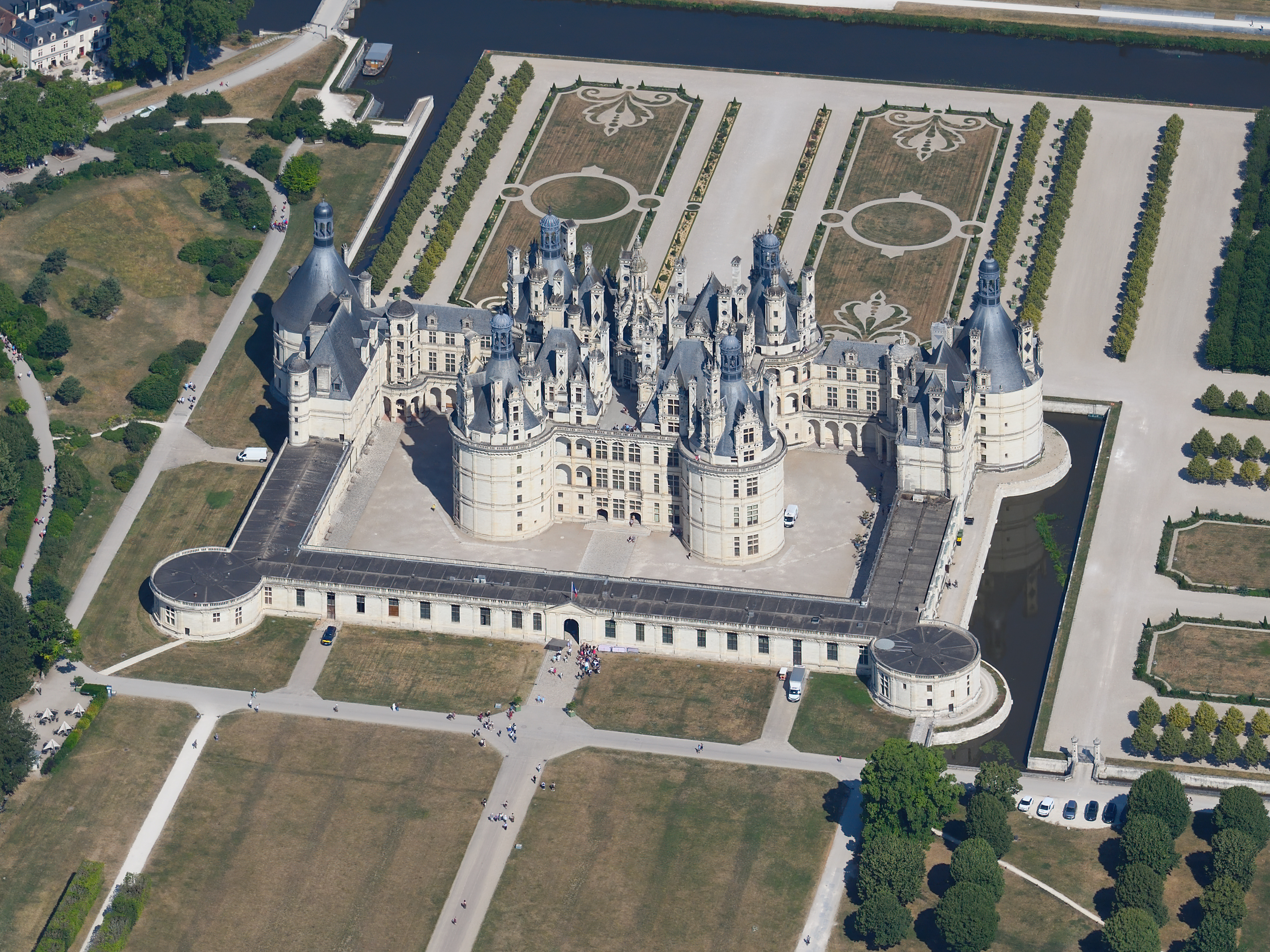
- Aerial view of the Château de Chambord

- Location within France

General information
- Status: Extant
- Architectural style: French Renaissance, Classical Renaissance
- Location: Chambord, Loir-et-Cher, France, Chateau 41250, Chambord, France
- Coordinates: 47°36′58″N 01°31′02″E
- Construction started: 1519
- Completed: 1547

Height
- Height: 56 m (184 ft)

Design and construction
- Architect: Domenico da Cortona
- Structural engineer: Pierre Nepveu

Website
- Official site of the Chateau de Chambord

UNESCO World Heritage Site
- Official name: The Loire Valley between Sully-sur-Loire and Chalonnes
- Type: Cultural
- Criteria: i, ii, vi
- Designated: 1981 (5th session)
- Reference no.: 933
- Region: Europe

The Château de Chambord (French pronunciation: [ʃɑto d(ə) ʃɑ̃bɔʁ]) in Chambord, Centre-Val de Loire, France, is one of the most recognisable châteaux in the world because of its very distinctive French Renaissance architecture, which blends traditional French medieval forms with classical Renaissance structures. The building was commissioned by Francis I of France and built between 1519 and 1547.

Chambord is the largest château in the Loire Valley; it was built to serve as a hunting lodge for Francis I, who maintained his royal residences at the Château de Blois and Amboise. The original design of the château is attributed to the Tuscan architect Domenico da Cortona; Leonardo da Vinci may have also influenced the design.

Chambord was altered considerably during the 28 years of its construction, during which it was overseen on-site by Pierre Neveu. With the château nearing completion, Francis showed off his enormous symbol of wealth and power by hosting his old arch-rival, Charles V, Holy Roman Emperor, at Chambord.

In 1792, in the wake of the French Revolution, some of the furnishings were sold and timber removed. For a time the building was left abandoned, though in the 19th century some attempts were made at restoration. During the Second World War, art works from the collections of the Louvre and the Château de Compiègne were moved to the Château de Chambord. The château is now open to the public, receiving 700,000 visitors in 2007. Flooding in June 2016 damaged the grounds but not the château itself.

== Architecture ==
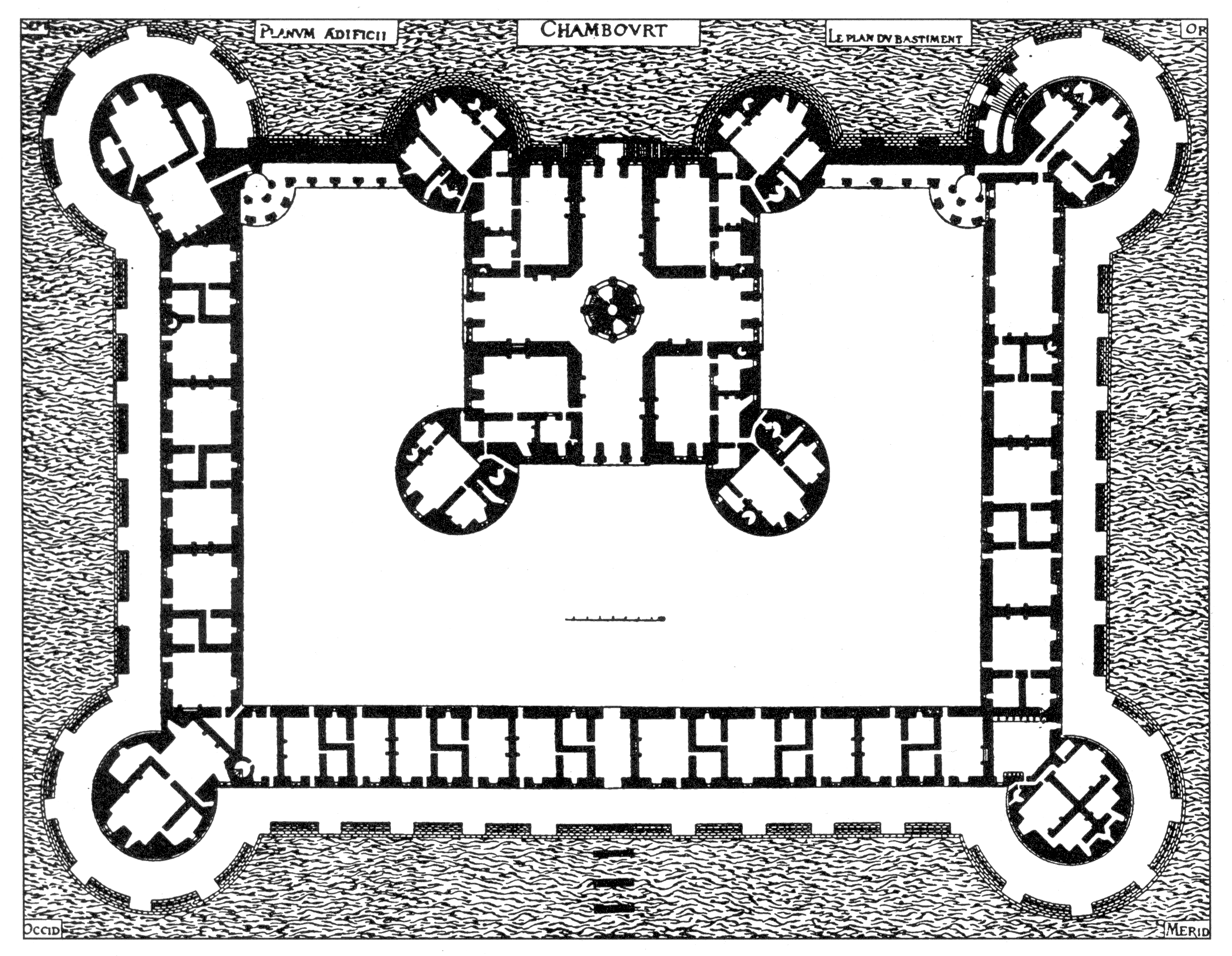
Plan of the château as engraved by Jacques Androuet du Cerceau (1576)

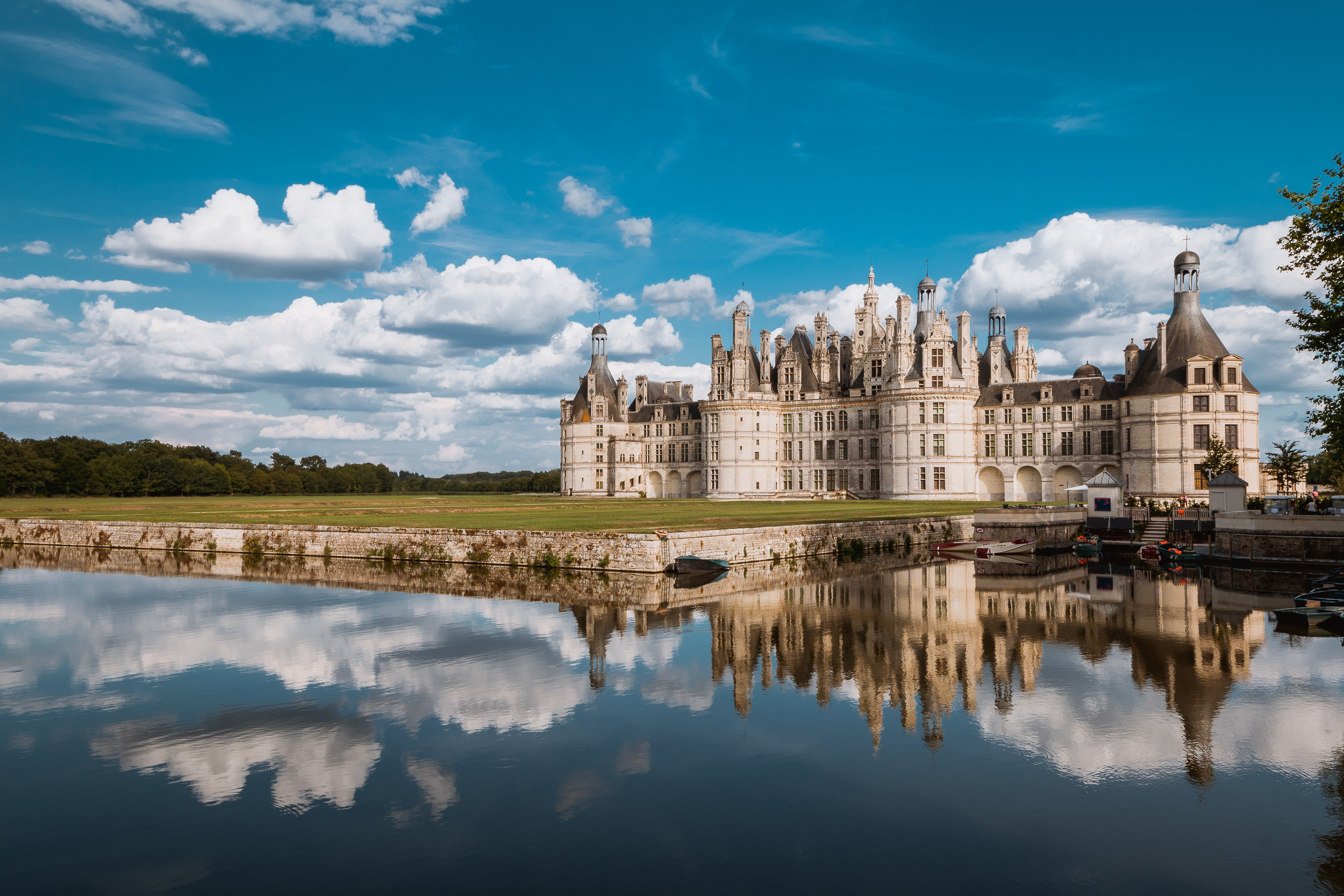
The château and decorative moat viewed from the north-west (2015)

Châteaux in the 16th century departed from castle architecture. (Note: Although château and castle derive from the Latin castellum, their meaning is different. In French, château-fort refers to a castle, while château more properly describes a country house.) Indeed, while they were off-shoots of castles, with features commonly associated with them, they did not have serious defences. Extensive gardens and water features, such as moats, were common amongst châteaux from this period. Chambord is no exception to this pattern. The layout is reminiscent of a typical castle with a keep, corner towers, and defended by a moat. Built in Renaissance style, the internal layout is an early example of the French and Italian style of grouping rooms into self-contained suites, a departure from the medieval style of corridor rooms. (Note: Viollet-le-Duc, however, in his Dictionnaire raisonné de l'architecture française (1885) found that there was "nothing Italianate [about Chambord] ..., in thought or in form".) The massive château is composed of a central keep with four bastion towers at the corners. The keep also forms part of the front wall of a larger compound with two larger towers. Bases for a possible further two towers are found at the rear, but these were never developed, and remain the same height as the wall. The château features 440 rooms, 282 fireplaces, and 84 staircases. Four rectangular vaulted hallways on each floor form a cross-shape.

As the château was never intended to provide any form of defence from enemies, the walls, towers and partial moat are decorative, and at the time were even an anachronism. Some elements of its architecture—open windows, loggias, and a vast outdoor area at the top, borrowed from the Italian Renaissance architecture—were less practical in the cold and damp climate of northern France.

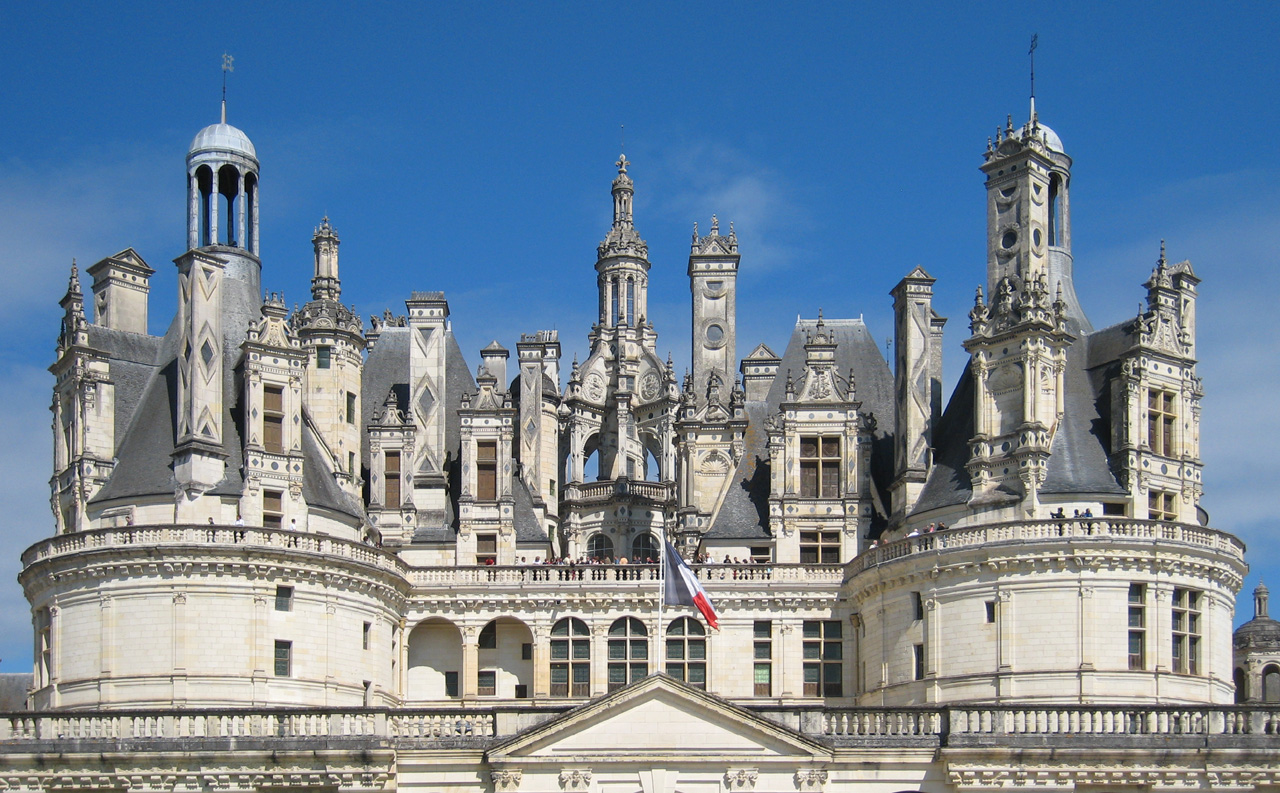
The elaborately developed roofline. The keep's façade is asymmetrical, with the exception of the north-west façade, latterly revised, when the two wings were added to the château.

The roofscape of Chambord contrasts with the masses of its masonry and has often been compared with the skyline of a town: it features 11 kinds of towers and three types of chimneys, without symmetry, framed at the corners by the massive towers. The design parallels are north Italian and Leonardesque. Writer Henry James remarked, "the towers, cupolas, the gables, the lanterns, the chimneys, look more like the spires of a city than the salient points of a single building."

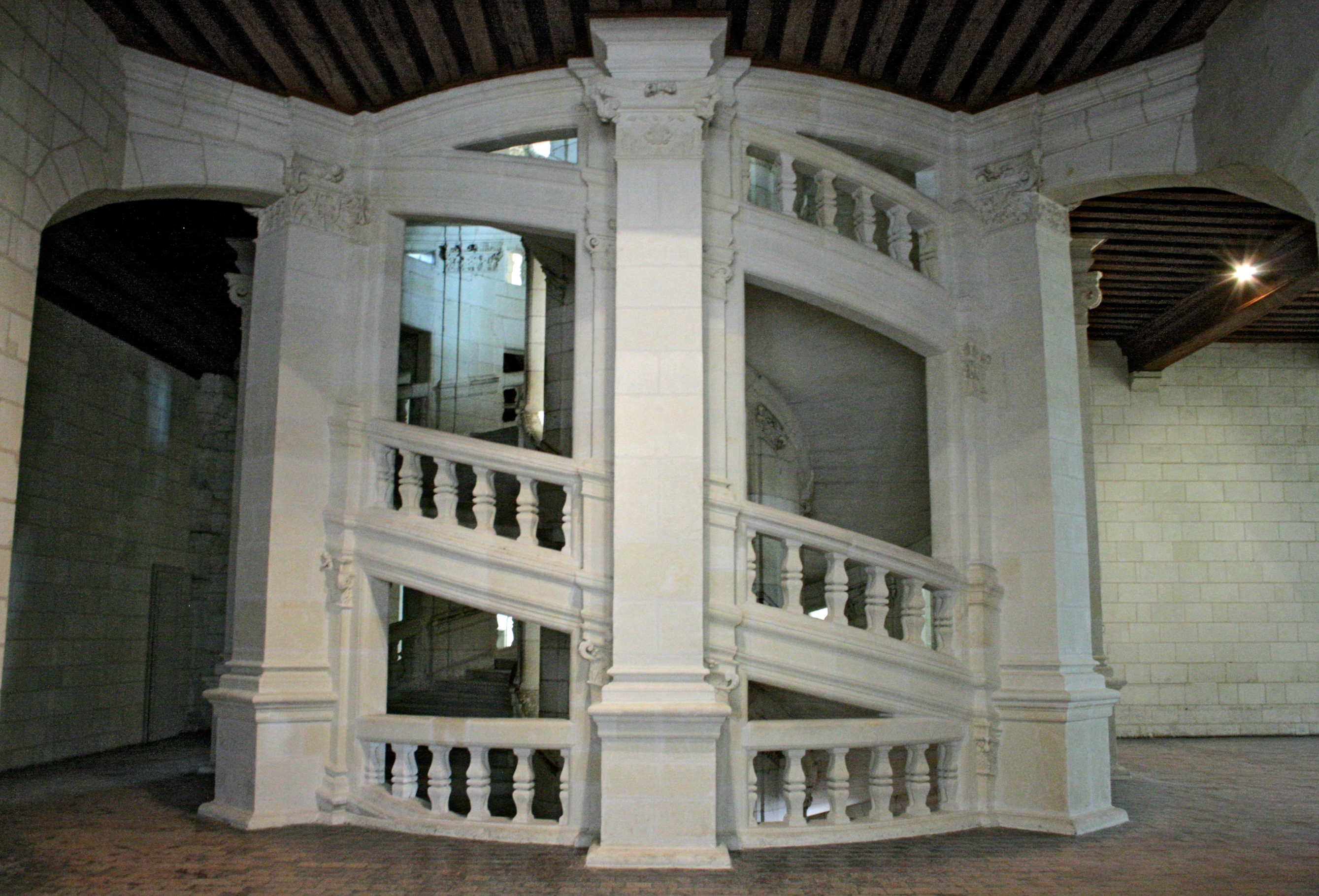
The double-spiral staircase

One of the architectural highlights is the open double-spiral staircase that is the centrepiece of the château. The two spirals ascend the three floors without ever meeting, illuminated from above by a sort of light house at the highest point of the château. There are suggestions that Leonardo da Vinci may have designed the staircase, but this has not been confirmed. Writer John Evelyn said of the staircase, "it is devised with four [sic] entries or ascents, which cross one another, so that though four persons meet, they never come in sight, but by small loopholes, till they land. It consists of 274 steps (as I remember), and is an extraordinary work, but of far greater expense than use or beauty."

The château also features 128 metres (420 ft) of façade, more than 800 sculpted columns and an elaborately decorated roof. When Francis I commissioned the construction of Chambord, he wanted it to look like the skyline of Constantinople.

The château is surrounded by a 52.5-square-kilometre (13,000-acre) wooded park and game reserve maintained with red deer, enclosed by a 31-kilometre (19-mile) wall. The king's plan to divert the Loire to surround the château came about only in a novel; Amadís de Gaula, which Francis had translated. In the novel the château is referred to as the Palace of Firm Isle.

Chambord's towers are atypical of French contemporary design in that they lack turrets and spires. In the opinion of author Tanaka Hidemichi, who suggests Leonardo da Vinci influenced the château's design, they are closer in design to minarets of 15th-century Milan.

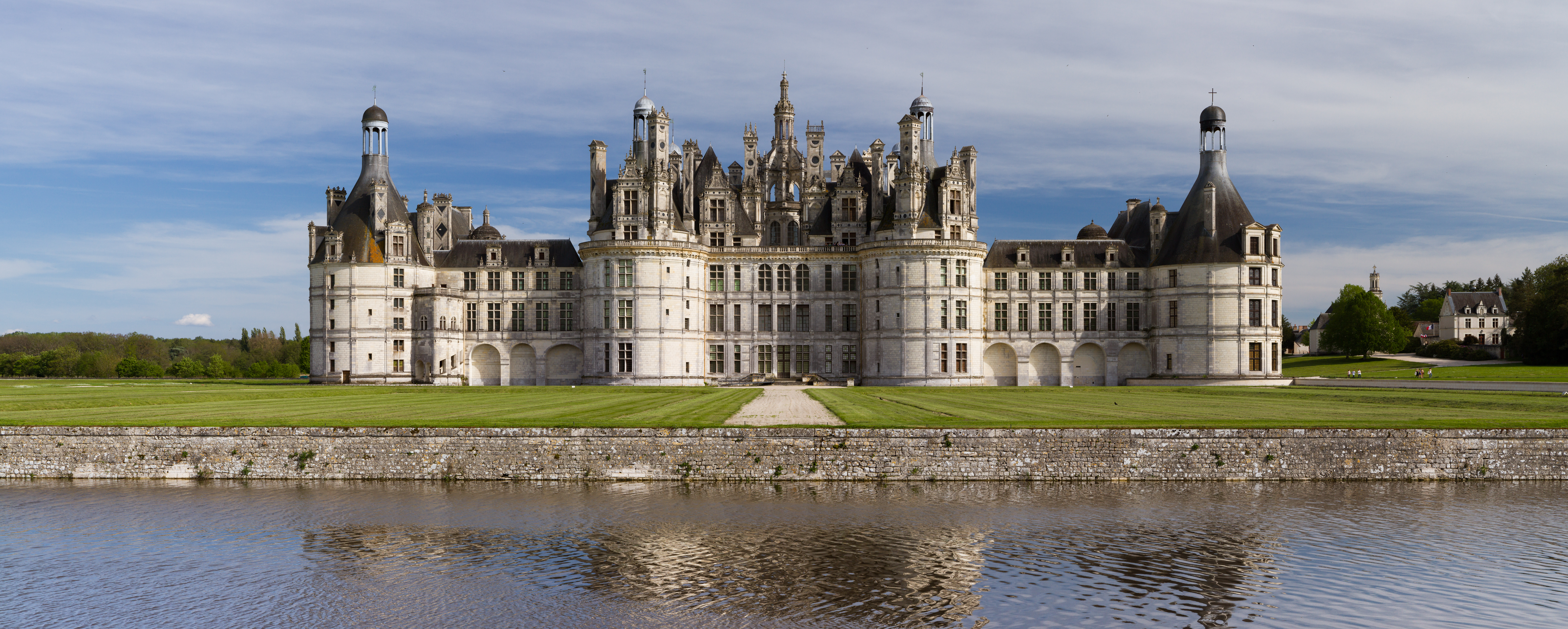
Northwest façade of the Château de Chambord

== History ==
=== Royal ownership ===
Félibien's drawings based on a wooden model

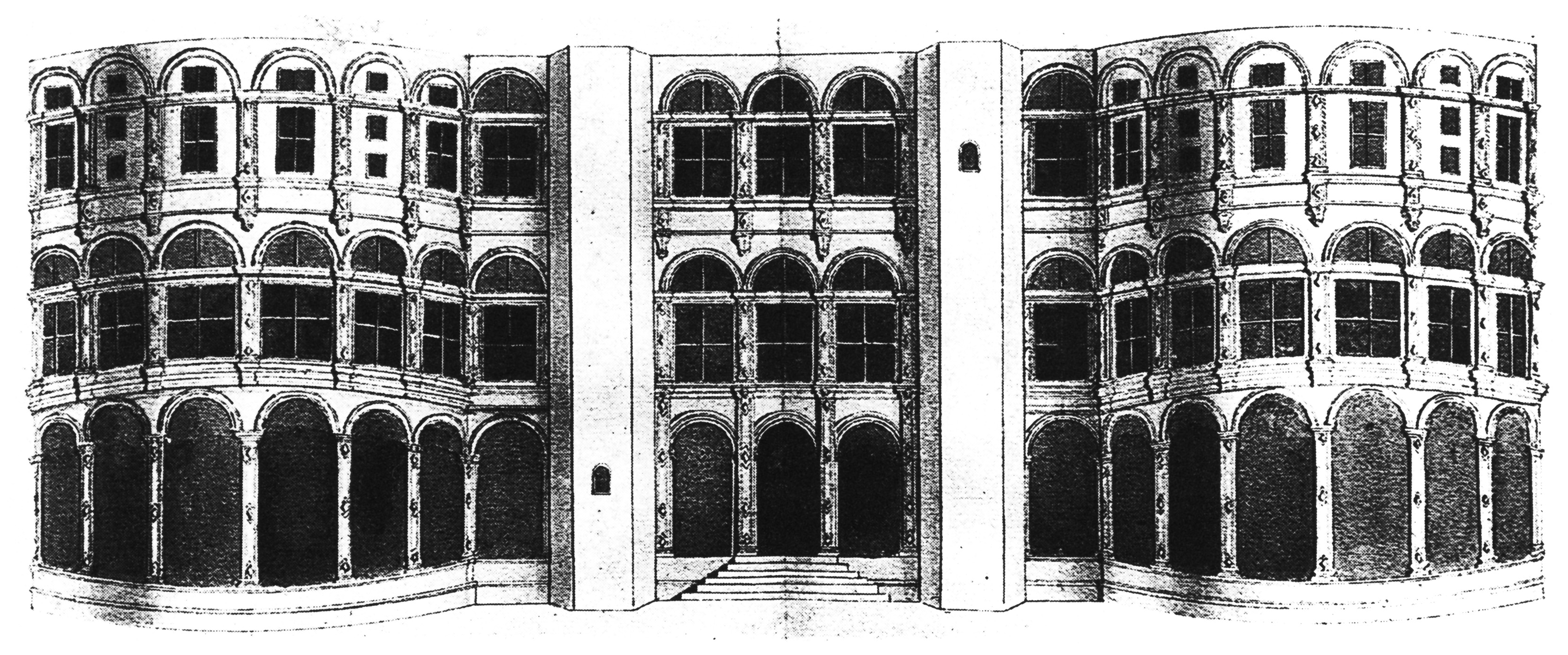
Façade of the keep

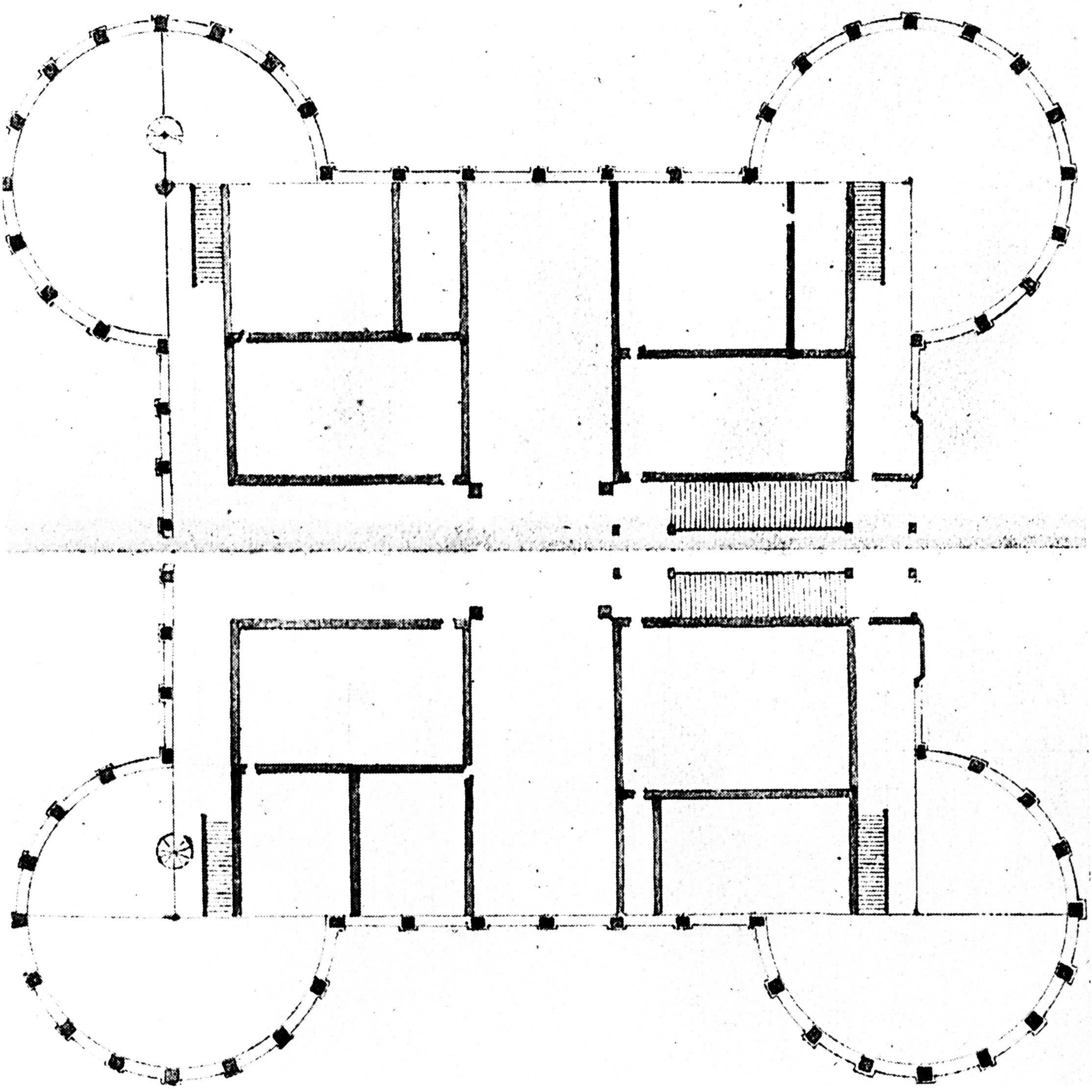
Plan of the keep

Who designed the Château de Chambord is a matter of controversy. The original design is attributed, though with several doubts, to Domenico da Cortona, whose wooden model for the design survived long enough to be drawn by André Félibien in the 17th century. In the drawings of the model, the main staircase of the keep is shown with two straight, parallel flights of steps separated by a passage and is located in one of the arms of the cross. According to Jean-Guillaume, this Italian design was later replaced with the centrally located spiral staircase, which is similar to that at Blois, and a design more compatible with the French preference for spectacular grand staircases. However, "at the same time the result was also a triumph of the centralised layout—itself a wholly Italian element." In 1913 Marcel Reymond suggested that Leonardo da Vinci, a guest of Francis at Clos Lucé near Amboise, was responsible for the original design, which reflects Leonardo's plans for a château at Romorantin for the king's mother, and his interests in central planning and double-spiral staircases; the discussion has not yet concluded, although many scholars now agree that Leonardo was at least responsible for the design of the central staircase.

Archaeological findings by Jean-Sylvain Caillou & Dominic Hofbauer have established that the lack of symmetry of some façades derives from an original design, abandoned shortly after the construction began, and which ground plan was organised around the central staircase following a central gyratory symmetry. Such a rotative design has no equivalent in architecture at this period of history, and appears reminiscent of Leonardo da Vinci's works on hydraulic turbines or the helicopter. Had it been respected, it is believed that this unique building could have featured the quadruple-spiral open staircase, strangely described by John Evelyn and Andrea Palladio, although it was never built.

Regardless of who designed the château, on 6 September 1519 Francis de Pontbriand was ordered to begin construction of the Château de Chambord. The work was interrupted by the Italian War of 1521–1526, and work was slowed by dwindling royal funds and difficulties in laying the structure's foundations. By 1524, the walls were barely above ground level. Building resumed in September 1526, at which point 1,800 workers were employed in building the château. At the time of the death of Francis I in 1547, the work had cost 444,070 livres.

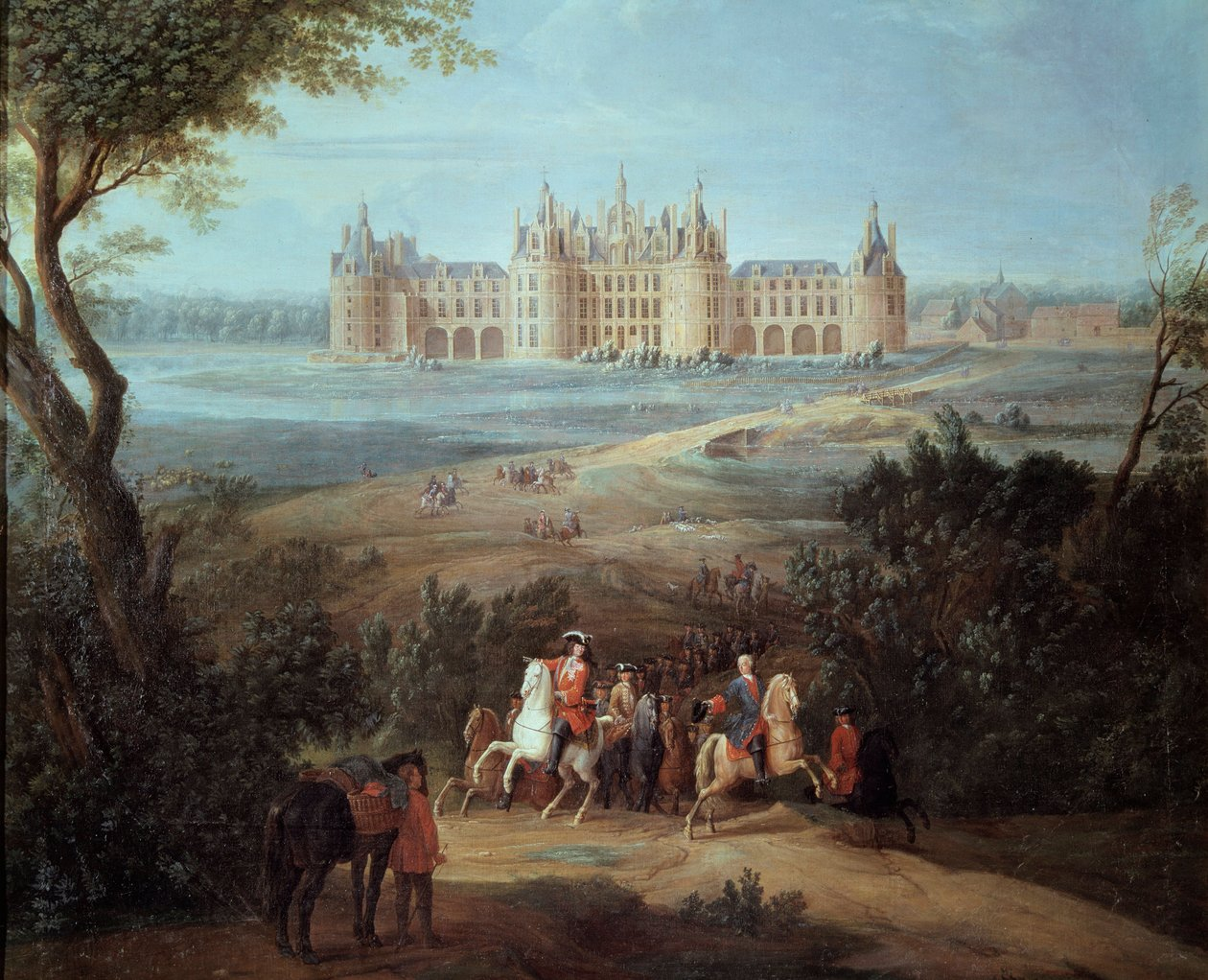
Painting by Pierre-Denis Martin of Château de Chambord in 1722

The château was built to act as a hunting lodge for Francis I; however, the king spent barely seven weeks there in total, that time consisting of short hunting visits. As the château had been constructed with the purpose of short stays, it was not practical to live in on a longer-term basis. The massive rooms, open windows and high ceilings meant heating was impractical. Similarly, as the château was not surrounded by a village or estate, there was no immediate source of food other than game. This meant that all food had to be brought with the group, typically numbering up to 2,000 people at a time.

As a result of all the above, the château was completely unfurnished during this period. All furniture, wall coverings, eating implements and so forth were brought specifically for each hunting trip, a major logistical exercise. It is for this reason that much furniture from the era was built to be disassembled to facilitate transportation. After Francis died of a heart attack in 1547, the château was not used for almost a century.

For more than 80 years after the death of Francis I, French kings abandoned the château, allowing it to fall into decay. Finally, in 1639, Louis XIII gave it to his brother, Gaston, Duke of Orléans, who saved the château from ruin by carrying out much restoration work.

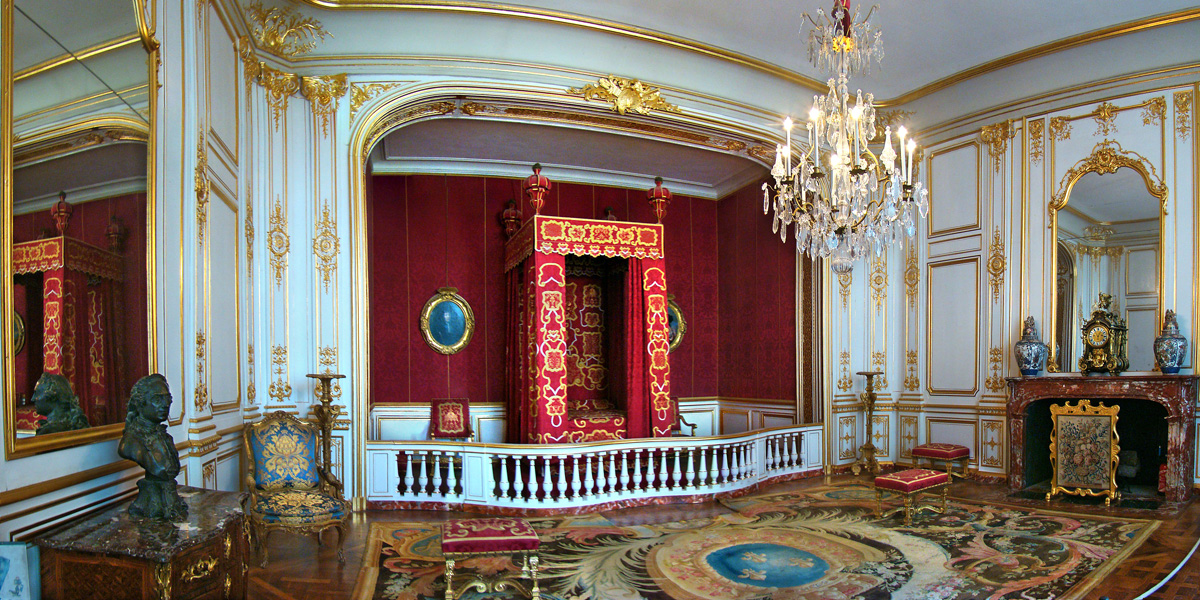
Louis XIV's ceremonial bedroom

Louis XIV had the great keep restored and furnished the royal apartments. The king then added a 1,200-horse stable, enabling him to use the château as a hunting lodge and a place to entertain for a few weeks each year, for example Molière presented the premiere of his celebrated comedy, Le Bourgeois gentilhomme here. Nonetheless, Louis XIV abandoned the château in 1685.

From 1725 to 1733, Stanisław Leszczyński (Stanislas I), the deposed King of Poland and the father-in-law of Louis XV, lived at Chambord. In 1745, as a reward for valour, the king gave the château to Maurice de Saxe, Marshal of France, who installed his military regiment there. Maurice de Saxe died in 1750, and once again the colossal château sat empty for many years.

=== French Revolution and modern history ===
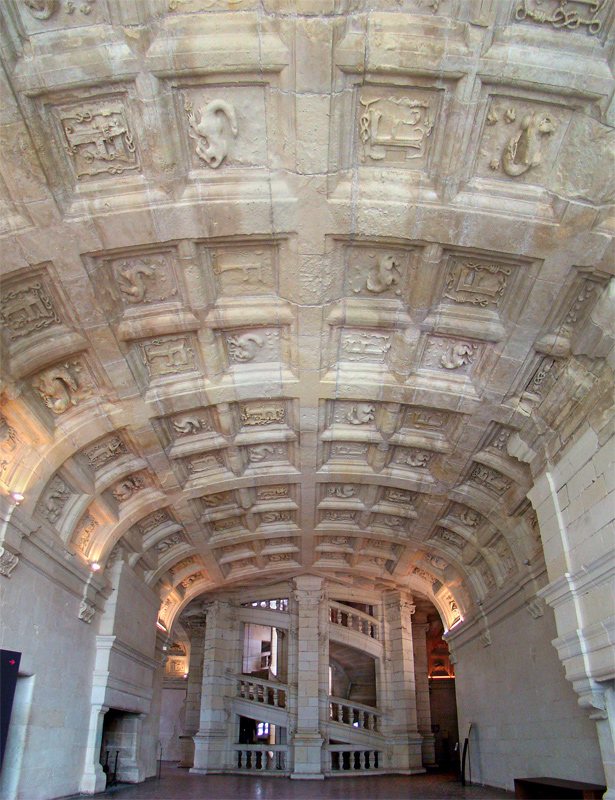
On the second floor

In 1792, the Revolutionary government ordered the sale of the furnishings; the wall panellings were removed and even floors were taken up and sold for the value of their timber, and, according to M de la Saussaye, the panelled doors were burned to keep the rooms warm during the sales; the empty château was left abandoned until Napoleon Bonaparte gave it to his subordinate, Louis Alexandre Berthier. The château was subsequently purchased from his widow for the infant Duke of Bordeaux, Henry Charles (1820–1883) who took the title Count of Chambord. A brief attempt at restoration and occupation was made by his grandfather Charles X (1824–1830) but in 1830 both were exiled. In Outre-Mer: A Pilgrimage Beyond the Sea, published in the 1830s, Henry Wadsworth Longfellow remarked on the dilapidation that had set in: "all is mournful and deserted. The grass has overgrown the pavement of the courtyard, and the rude sculpture upon the walls is broken and defaced". During the Franco-Prussian War (1870–1871) the château was used as a field hospital.

The final attempt to make use of the colossus came from the Count of Chambord, but after the Count died in 1883, the château was left to his sister's heirs, the titular Dukes of Parma, then resident in Austria-Hungary; firstly Robert, Duke of Parma, who died in 1907 and after him, Elias, Prince of Parma. Any attempts at restoration ended with the onset of World War I in 1914. The Château de Chambord was confiscated as enemy property in 1915, but the family of the duke of Parma sued to recover it, and that suit was not settled until 1932; restoration work was not begun until a few years after World War II ended in 1945. The Château and surrounding areas, some 5,440 hectares (13,400 acres; 21.0 sq mi), have belonged to the French state since 1930.

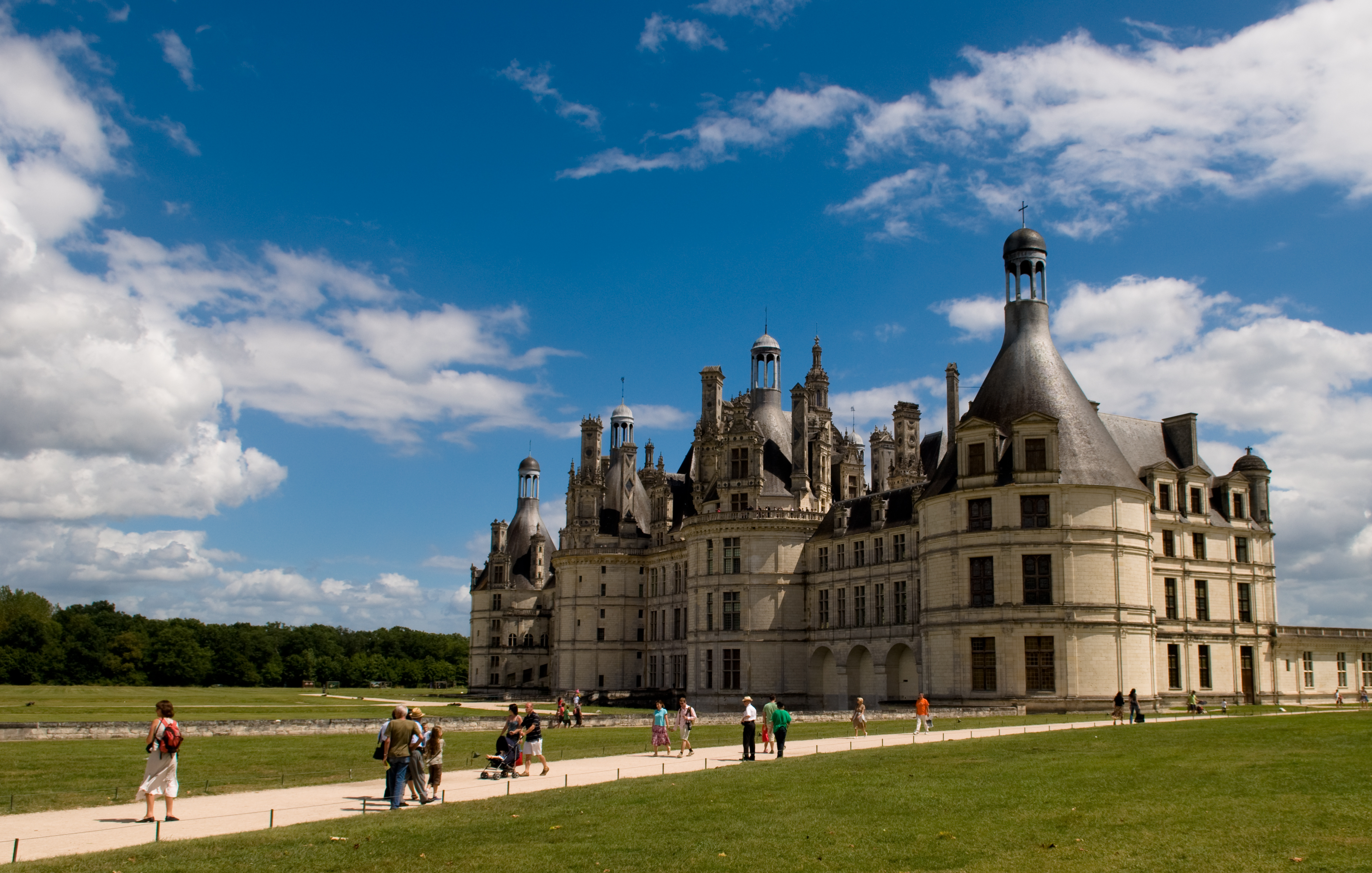
Today, the Château de Chambord is a popular tourist attraction.

In 1939, shortly before the outbreak of World War II, the art collections of the Louvre and Compiègne museums (including the Mona Lisa) were stored at the Château de Chambord. An American B-24 Liberator bomber crashed onto the château lawn on 22 June 1944. The image of the château has been widely used to sell commodities from chocolate to alcohol and from porcelain to alarm clocks; combined with the various written accounts of visitors, this made Chambord one of the best known examples of France's architectural history. Today, Chambord is a major tourist attraction, and in 2007 around 700,000 people visited the château.

After unusually heavy rainfall, Chambord was closed to the public from 1 to 6 June 2016. The River Cosson, a tributary of the Loire, flooded its banks and the château's moat. Drone photography documented some of the peak flooding. The French Patrimony Foundation described effects of the flooding on Chambord's 5,250 hectares (13,000 acres) property. The 31-kilometre (19 mi) wall around the château was breached at several points, metal gates were torn from their framing, and roads were damaged. Trees were also uprooted and certain electrical and fire protection systems were put out of order. However, the château itself and its collections reportedly were undamaged. The foundation observed that paradoxically the natural disaster effected Francis I's vision that Chambord appears to rise from the waters as if it were diverting the Loire. Repairs are expected to cost 200,000 Euro. In 2025, the director of the Château announced that Francis I wing of the Château was in urgent need of repairs and that 37 million euro was needed for them.

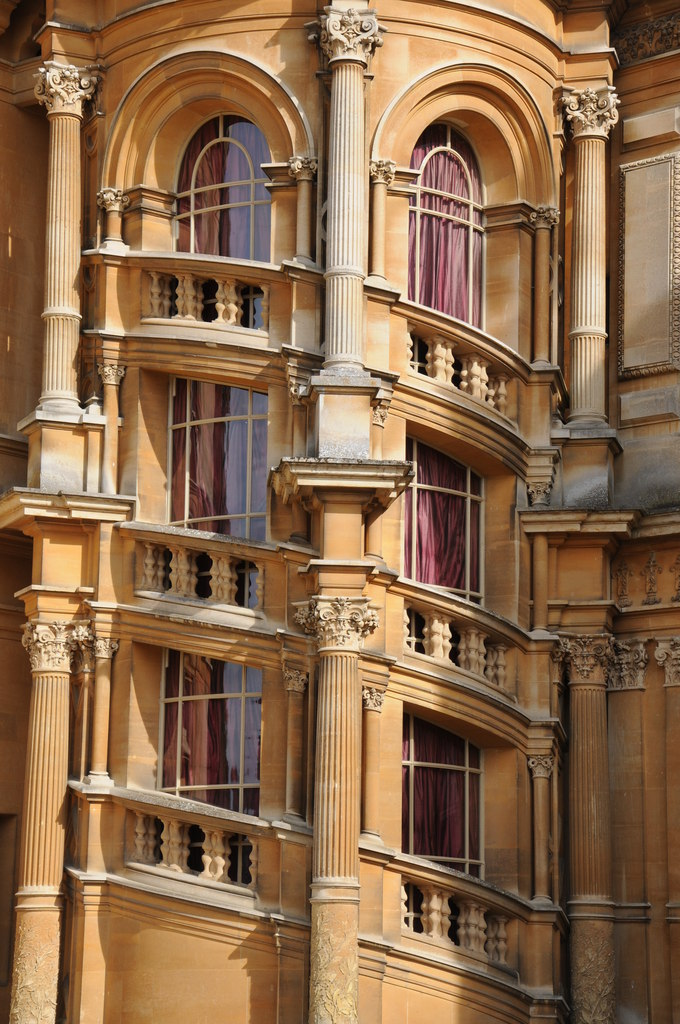
One of the twin staircase towers at Waddesdon Manor, inspired by those at the Château de Chambord and disseminated by architect Gabriel-Hippolyte Destailleur between 1874 and 1889.

== Influence ==
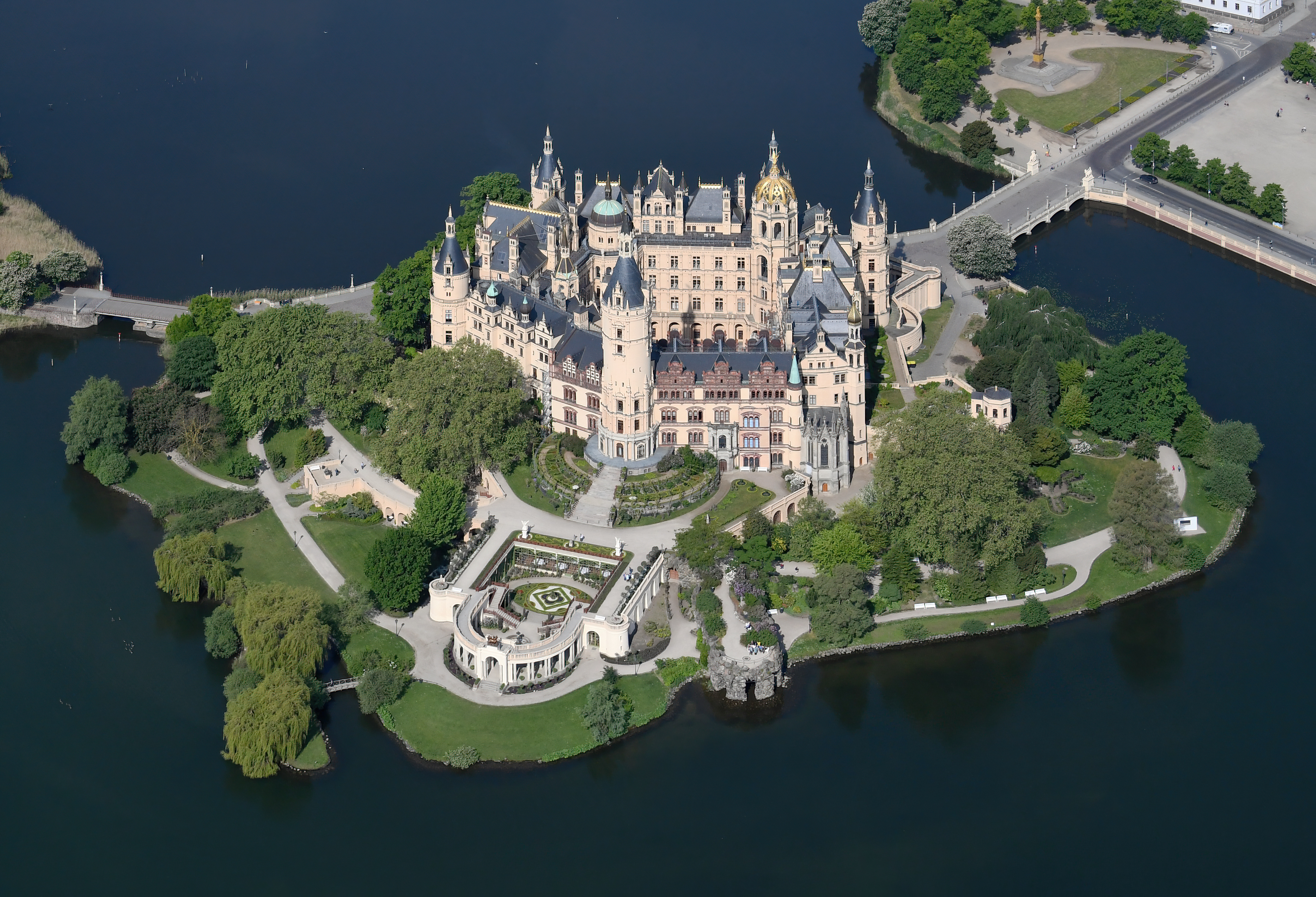
The architecture of Schwerin Palace was inspired by Château de Chambord

The Château de Chambord has further influenced a number of architectural and decorative elements across Europe. Château de Chambord was the model for the reconstruction and new construction of the original Schwerin Palace between 1845 and 1857.

Yet in the later half of the 19th century, the château's style proliferated across the United Kingdom, influencing the Founder's Building at Royal Holloway, University of London, designed by William Henry Crossland and the main building of Fettes College in Edinburgh, designed by David Bryce in 1870. Between 1874 and 1889, the country house in Buckinghamshire, Waddesdon Manor, was built with similar architectural frameworks as the Château de Chambord, disseminated via the architect Gabriel-Hippolyte Destailleur. For instance, the twin staircase towers, on the north façade, were inspired by the staircase tower at the château. However, following the theme of unparalleled luxury at Waddesdon, the windows of the towers at Waddesdon were glazed, unlike those of the staircase at Chambord, and were far more ornate.

== In popular culture ==
- Cordel Encantado (2011) – in 2011, Château de Chambord served as the setting to represent the fictional kingdom of Serafia do Norte in the Brazilian telenovela.
- Valiant Hearts (2021) – during World War II, six Jewish children are hidden by the French Resistance in the Château de Chambord to escape the Holocaust.
- Like a Prince (2023) – the main character portrayed by Ahmed Sylla is sentenced to community service at the Château de Chambord.
