= The Climb (2017 film) =

- Film poster
- Directed by: Ludovic Bernard
- Written by: Ludovic Bernard; Nadir Dendoune; Olivier Ducray
- Based on: Un tocard sur le toit du monde by Nadir Dendoune
- Produced by: Laurence Lascary
- Starring: Ahmed Sylla; Alice Belaïdi
- Cinematography: Yannick Ressigeac
- Edited by: Romain Rioult
- Music by: Lucien Papalu, Laurent Sauvagnac
- Production companies: France 2 Cinéma; DACP; Mars Films; Auvergne Rhône-Alpes Cinéma
- Distributed by: Mars Distribution
- Release dates: 18 February 2017 (Festival du Film de Comédie de L'Alpe d'Huez); 25 January 2017
- Running time: 103 minutes
- Country: France
- Language: French
- Budget: $6.2 million
- Box office: $8.4 million

The Climb (French: L'Ascension, pronounced [lasɑ̃sjɔ̃]) is a 2017 French adventure comedy film directed by Ludovic Bernard which tells the real-life story of Nadir Dendoune.

== Plot ==
Samy Diakhaté is a young man of Senegalese origin from the Cité des 4000 in La Courneuve. Like many of his friends, he is unemployed but wants to get out of it. Since middle school, he has been in love with Nadia, an employee of the neighborhood supermarket. He tries to win her with his kindness, but she resists him, for fear of loving a frivolous boy who will disappoint her. Samy tells her that out of love for her, he would climb Mount Everest, but Nadia takes this for a joke. Samy, determined to impress Nadia, starts looking for funding for his trip to Nepal. Without having experience of mountaineering or even physical training, he throws himself into the adventure but quickly realizes his weaknesses and the colossal challenge he must face. Meanwhile, the news has spread through the suburbs and Paris like wildfire: the whole suburb, radio and press, is with Samy to cheer him on and watch his exploits hour by hour, while his mother is dying of anguish at losing her son.

== Cast ==
- Ahmed Sylla as Samy Diakhate
- Alice Belaïdi as Nadia
- Kévin Razy as Ben
- Nicolas Wanczycki as Jeff
- Waly Dia as Max
- Maïmouna Gueye as Madame Diakhate
- Denis Mpunga as M. Diakhate
- Fadila Belkebla as Houria
- Moussa Maaskri as Nassir
- Umesh Tamang as Johnny
- Shriprem Gurung as Dorge
- Amir El Kacem as Kevi
- Hervé Grull as The Narrator
- Jochen Hägele as Emmerich
- Julian Bugier as himself

== Production ==
The movie was first introduced during the Festival du Film de Comédie de L'Alpe d'Huez.

== See also ==
- List of media related to Mount Everest
