= The Worst Ones =

- Theatrical release poster
- French: Les Pires
- Directed by: Lise Akoka; Romane Gueret
- Screenplay by: Lise Akoka; Romane Gueret; Elénore Gurrey
- Produced by: Marine Alaric; Frédéric Jouve
- Cinematography: Eric Dumont
- Edited by: Albertine Lastera
- Music by: Sebastien Pan
- Production companies: Les Films Velvet; France 3 Cinéma; Pictanovo
- Distributed by: Pyramide Distribution
- Release dates: 22 May 2022 (Cannes); 7 December 2022 (France)
- Running time: 99 minutes
- Country: France
- Language: French
- Box office: $308,170

The Worst Ones (French: Les Pires) is a 2022 French drama film directed by Lise Akoka and Romane Gueret. The film premiered at the 2022 Cannes Film Festival, where it won the Un Certain Regard Award.

== Premise ==
The film tells behind the scenes of a shoot in the North of France. A film director chooses to shoot in the Picasso city, in Boulogne-sur-Mer. He sends out a casting, looking for atypical personalities: young school dropouts, ADHD sufferers, foster children, young people leaving home... He chooses two girls and two boys, Lily, Maylis, Jessy and Ryan. Everyone is surprised by this choice: why did he only take “the worst”? Local associations are worried about the impossible hopes represented by the easy life of a film crew, and the filmmaker is worried about reinforcing the stereotypes he wanted to denounce.

The film portrays its heroes. Raised by his sister, Ryan has attention disorders and hyperactivity and cannot stand the school environment despite the help of his life assistant. Lily goes from one guy to another, and we discover that she is weakened by the death of her brother, who died of cancer. Maylis, very little expansive, wonders about her participation in the shooting. Jessy, finally, plays the provocateur but he hides flaws too.

== Cast ==
- Mallory Wanecque as Lily
- Timéo Mahaut as Ryan
- Johan Heldenbergh as Gabriel
- Loïc Pech as Jessy
- Mélina Vanderplancke as Maylis
- Esther Archambault as Judith
- Matthias Jacquin as Victor
- Angélique Gernez as Mélodie
- Dominique Frot as Ryan's grandmother
- Rémy

== Production ==
Akoka and Gueret had previously made a short film, Chasse Royale, dealing with the practice of film casting. After that, they decided to create a story about film production.

== Release ==
The Worst Ones premiered 22 May at the 2022 Cannes Film Festival, where it won the Un Certain Regard Award. It was theatrically released in France on 7 December 2022 by Pyramide Distribution.

== Reception ==
=== Critical response ===
On the review aggregator website Rotten Tomatoes, the film has an approval rating of 100% based on 27 reviews, with an average rating of 7.5/10. Metacritic assigned the film a weighted average score of 76 out of 100, based on 5 critics, indicating "generally favorable reviews".

=== Awards and nominations ===
Year	Award / Festival	Category	Recipient(s)	Result	Ref.
2022	Cannes Film Festival	Un Certain Regard Award	Lise Akoka and Romane Gueret	Won	
2022	Sarlat Film Festival	Best Actress	Mallory Wanecque	Won	
2022	Festival des Avant-premières de Cosne sur Loire	Best Actress	Mallory Wanecque	Won	
2022	Rome Film Festival	Do-Cine Rising Star Award for Best International Young Actor	Mallory Wanecque	Won	
2023	Paris Film Critics Awards	Best First Film	Lise Akoka and Romane Gueret	Nominated	
2023	Paris Film Critics Awards	Best Female Revelation	Mallory Wanecque	Nominated	
2023	César Awards	Best First Feature Film	Marine Alaric, Frédéric Jouve, Lise Akoka, Romane Gueret	Nominated	
2023	César Awards	Most Promising Actress	Mallory Wanecque	Nominated	
2023	Cabourg Film Festival	Prix Premier Rendez-Vous	Mallory Wanecque	Won	
