= Mallory Wanecque =

French actress (born 2006)

- Wanecque in 2026
- Born: 26 July 2006 (age 20); Valenciennes, France
- Occupation: Actress
- Years active: 2022–present

Mallory Wanecque (French: [wanɛk]; born 26 July 2006) is a French actress. She is known for her starring role in her debut feature film, The Worst Ones (2022), for which she won the Rising Star Award for Best International Young Actor at the 2022 Rome Film Festival, and was nominated for the 2023 César Awards for Most Promising Actress.

== Early life ==
Wanecque was born on 26 July 2006 in Valenciennes, a commune in the Nord department, Hauts-de-France, France. She attended the Jules Ferry School in Anzin.

One day as she was leaving the school holding her little sister in her arms, she came across three women who were distributing flyers for a casting and caught the eye of the casting director for the film The Worst Ones (2022), who left her number with Wanecque. She passed the audition and then quit high school to devote herself to a film career.

== Career ==
In 2022, Wanecque made her film debut with a starring role in the drama The Worst Ones, directed by Lise Akoka and Romane Gueret, for which she won the Rising Star Award for Best International Young Actor at the 2022 Rome Film Festival, and was nominated for the César Award for Most Promising Actress in 2023. She next starred as a teenage boxer in Ali Marhyar's comedy Like a Prince (2023).

In 2024, Wanecque starred in Teddy Lussi-Modeste's drama The Good Teacher, and in Gilles Lellouche's romantic comedy musical Beating Hearts.

== Filmography ==
Key
†	Denotes films that have not yet been released

Year	Title	Role	Notes
2022	The Worst Ones	Lily	
2023	Like a Prince	Melissa	
2024	The Good Teacher	Océane	
2024	Beating Hearts	Jackie (15 years old)	
2026	Hoppers	Mabel (voice)	French dub

== Awards and nominations ==
Year	Award / Festival	Category	Work	Result	Ref.
2022	Sarlat Film Festival	Best Actress	The Worst Ones	Won	
2022	Festival des Avant-premières de Cosne sur Loire	Best Actress	The Worst Ones	Won	
2022	Rome Film Festival	Do-Cine Rising Star Award for Best International Young Actor	The Worst Ones	Won	
2023	Paris Film Critics Awards	Best Female Revelation	The Worst Ones	Nominated	
2023	César Awards	Most Promising Actress	The Worst Ones	Nominated	
2023	Prix SACD	Prix Suzanne Bianchetti	The Worst Ones	Won	
2023	Cabourg Film Festival	Prix Premier Rendez-Vous	The Worst Ones	Won	
