= Domenico da Cortona =

Italian architect

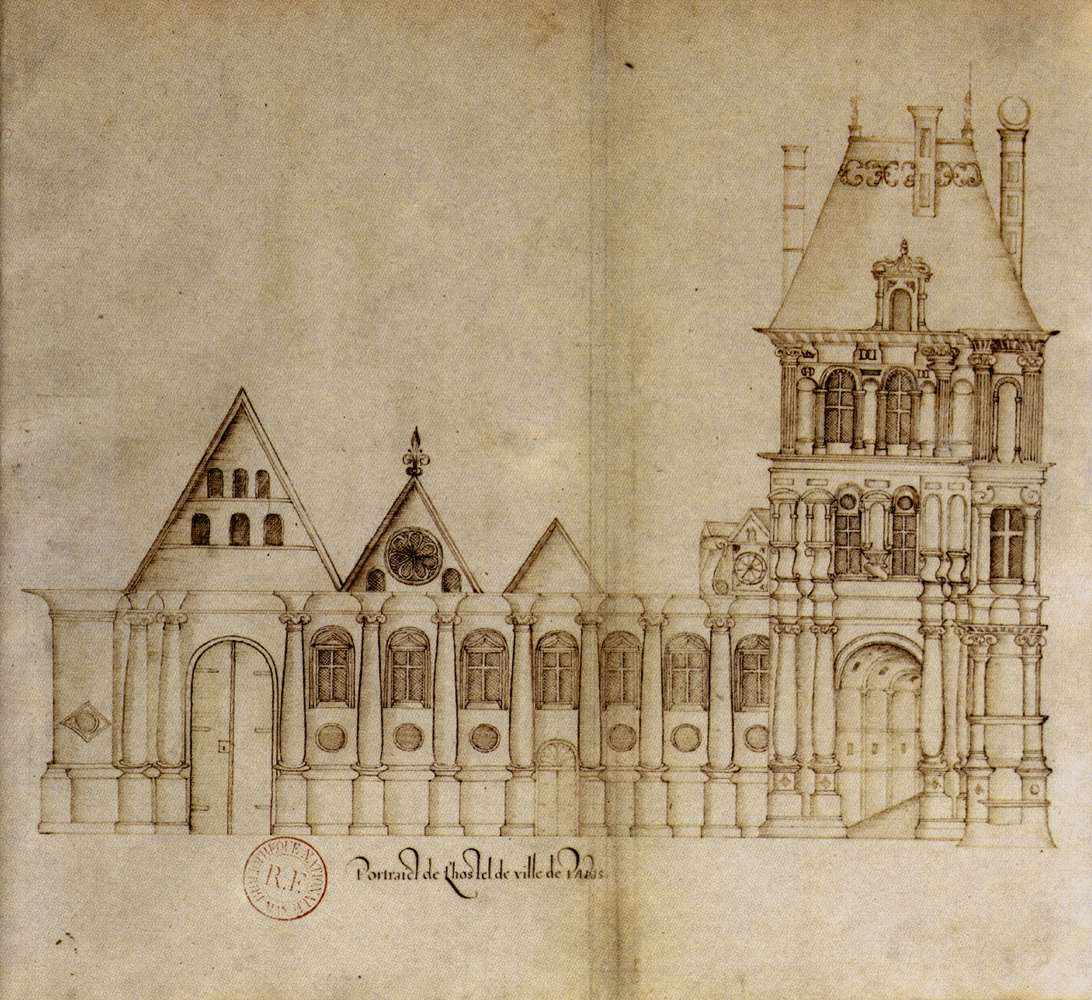
Domenico's Hôtel de Ville in Paris, as drawn by Jacques Cellier

Domenico da Cortona called "Boccador" (ca 1465 – ca 1549) was an Italian architect, a pupil of Giuliano da Sangallo. He was brought to France by Charles VIII and remained in the service of François I. His design for the royal Château de Chambord, represented in a wooden model, survived into the seventeenth century but responsibility for the design is also given to Leonardo da Vinci, who was at the royal court at Amboise at the same time, and the actual construction, during which much was improvised, was under the on-site supervision of Pierre Nepveu.

Domenico da Cortona was domiciled at Blois. He was at Amboise, responsible for design planning in festivities marking the birth of the dauphin in April 1518. He also supervised military engineering works at the châteaux of Tournai and Ardres.

Domenico is sometimes credited with designing the Église Saint-Eustache in Paris, although other architects have also been suggested. The Hôtel de Ville of Paris, destroyed during the Commune, 24 May 1871, bore an inscription ending Domenico Cortonensi architectante.

The standard monograph is P. Lesueur, Dominique de Cortone dit Boccador (Paris) 1928.
