= Incredible but True =

French comedy film by Quentin Dupieux

- Theatrical release poster
- French: Incroyable mais vrai
- Directed by: Quentin Dupieux
- Written by: Quentin Dupieux
- Produced by: Mathieu Verhaeghe; Thomas Verhaeghe
- Starring: Alain Chabat; Léa Drucker; Benoît Magimel; Anaïs Demoustier
- Cinematography: Quentin Dupieux
- Edited by: Quentin Dupieux
- Music by: Jon Santo
- Production company: Wild Bunch International
- Distributed by: Diaphana Distribution (France)
- Release dates: February 2022 (Berlinale); June 15, 2022 (France)
- Running time: 74 minutes
- Countries: France; Belgium
- Language: French
- Budget: €4.3 million

Incredible but True (French: Incroyable mais vrai) is a 2022 French-Belgian black comedy film written and directed by Quentin Dupieux. It stars Alain Chabat, Léa Drucker, Benoît Magimel, and Anaïs Demoustier. In the film, Alain (Chabat) and Marie (Drucker) see their lives turned upside down after moving into a new home which has a mysterious tunnel in the basement.

== Plot ==
Alain, who works as an insurance broker, looks to buy a new house in suburban France with his wife, Marie. The estate agent, Franck Chaise, reveals that a tunnel in the basement of one house causes anyone who enters to travel 12 hours into the future, but become 3 days younger. Buoyed by this, Marie convinces Alain to buy the home.

Alain invites his boss, Gérard, and his girlfriend Jeanne to visit the home; Marie spends most of the encounter in the tunnel, which she goes onto regularly use. At dinner, under pressure from Jeanne, Gérard reveals he had an electronic penis transplanted, which he controls through his smartphone. A few days later, Gérard injures his penis after falling over a shooting range; as it was transplanted in Japan, Gérard travels to the country to repair it and he instructs Alain to inform Jeanne he is going on a business trip. At the bookstore where she works, Jeanne makes unrequited sexual advances to Alain.

After Alain describes being unconvinced about the effects of the tunnel, Marie takes a rotten apple inside it; when she emerges, it no longer appears rotten but when Alain takes a bite, it is filled with ants. After visiting Doctor Urgent, the couple realize the tunnel only reverses ageing of the skin; internally, the person remains the same age.

Marie reveals her desire to become younger and be a famous model. Gérard contacts Alain to request him to purchase a birthday gift for Jeanne. Alain runs into Franck and asks about the tunnel's health impacts, who advises it to be used in moderation to avoid serious physical and psychological damage. Alain witnesses Jeanne cheat on Gérard with an employee at the bookstore.

Gérard eventually returns to France, having extended his stay in Japan after his penis initially fails in its repair. Gérard is then shown to have a different girlfriend, Mimi, whom he eventually marries; Gérard follows this with several failed relationships with other women. Marie and Alain continue to argue over the tunnel, causing him to attempt to have it closed.

Marie eventually emerges as a 19 year old, and struggles in her attempts to become a model. Gérard's penis catches fire while driving, causing him to suffer a serious car accident. After Marie suffers a nervous breakdown, Alain finally closes the tunnel and Marie is hospitalized, where she cuts herself to reveal she is full of ants.

== Cast ==
- Alain Chabat as Alain
- Léa Drucker as Marie
  - Roxane Arnal as Marie, 19 years old
- Benoît Magimel as Gérard
- Anaïs Demoustier as Jeanne
- Stéphane Pézerat as Franck Chaise
- Lena Lapres as Mimi
- Nagisa Morimoto
- Grégoire Bonnet as Doctor Urgent
- Marie-Christine Orry as Madame Lanvin
- Mikaël Halimi
- Michel Hazanavicius as a photographer

== Production ==
In early January 2021 Wild Bunch International announced the release of several French films despite the strict restrictions imposed by the COVID-19 pandemic. One of those movies would be "Incroyable mais vrai", a comedy directed by Quentin Dupieux.

Shooting was wrapped in late 2020 and the film premiered at the 72nd Berlin Film Festival as a Berlinale Special Gala.

== Reception ==
On the review aggregation website Rotten Tomatoes, the film holds an approval rating of 96% based on 24 reviews, with an average rating of 7.30/10. Metacritic assigned the film a weighted average score of 76 out of 100, based on 10 critics, indicating "generally favorable reviews".
