= Deerskin (film) =

2019 film

- Theatrical release poster
- French: Le Daim
- Directed by: Quentin Dupieux
- Written by: Quentin Dupieux
- Produced by: Mathieu Verhaeghe; Thomas Verhaeghe
- Starring: Jean Dujardin; Adèle Haenel
- Cinematography: Quentin Dupieux
- Edited by: Quentin Dupieux
- Music by: Janko Nilović
- Production companies: Atelier de production; Arte Cinema; Nexus Factory; UMedia; uFund; Garidi Films
- Release dates: 15 May 2019 (Cannes); 19 June 2019 (France)
- Running time: 77 minutes
- Country: France
- Language: French
- Budget: $4.2 million
- Box office: $1.7 million

Deerskin (French: Le Daim, lit. 'The Deer') is a 2019 French black comedy film written and directed by Quentin Dupieux. It stars Jean Dujardin and Adèle Haenel. In the film, Georges (Dujardin) becomes obsessive after purchasing a fringed deerskin jacket.

It had its world premiere at the Cannes Film Festival in the Directors' Fortnight section on 15 May 2019. It was released in France on 19 June 2019 by Diaphana Distribution.

== Plot ==
Georges, 44, buys a vintage fringed deerskin motorcycle jacket for €7,500 from an older man who lives in the countryside. The seller also gives him an almost-new digital camcorder for free unprompted, for which Georges has no use.

After buying the jacket, Georges checks into a small hotel in a nearby mountainside village. Having spent all his money on the jacket, he leaves his wedding ring as collateral with the receptionist. He meets a local bartender, a young woman named Denise, and says he is a filmmaker in town on a shoot. Denise is an amateur editor and takes interest.

Georges uses the digital camcorder to film the jacket and make believes that the jacket is sentient. The conversation gradually goes from fairly normal to a bit creepy. It has an ambiguous statement "Let's team up. But I am warning you I am in charge," which is not clear if it is supposed to be from Georges or the jacket. Georges does not explicitly mention the jacket in this conversation and aside from viewer knowledge, everything he said could have been mistaken to mean the digital camcorder.

The next day, Georges tries to use a cash machine, which doesn't work. Then he starts eating out of a trash can, while a mute boy watches, despite not yet checking with the bank. Georges then goes to the bank and discovers that his estranged wife has frozen his bank account. He begins hearing his jacket speak to him, telling him it dreams of being the only jacket in the world. A convenient suicide has Georges being able to stay in the hotel and gain a deerskin hat. Georges continues to gradually assemble a full deerskin outfit throughout the film.

Georges convinces Denise to begin financing his film, which she will edit. He uses the money to pay a series of townspeople to appear on film giving up their jackets, which he then steals. A mute boy watches him in several instances, and Georges eventually throws a brick at him.

Georges slowly assembles a full deerskin outfit as he continues filming the scenes. When one subject refuses to hand over his jacket in the cold, Georges apparently kills him, but conversation with Georges and the jacket implies he has not killed anyone yet. In the conversation, the jacket first only praises the camera work, only switching to encouraging murder after Georges says he thinks it wants him to do so. Shortly after, on the idea of the jacket, Georges breaks a blade off his hotel room ceiling fan and sharpens it into a weapon. He then goes on a killing spree, all of which he films.

When Georges is sleeping, the jacket says "Georges" over and over again, as if trying to wake him or check he is asleep. The viewer can barely hear Georges breathing peacefully in his sleep, as the voice has always previously used Georges' mouth to speak. Then Georges gets the jackets of the victims buried with the help of a digger and a digger operator. Careful filming makes the digger operator's jacket not be in frame for most of the camera recording.

Georges kills the digger operator for his jacket. Georges uses his bare hands to fill the hole rather than getting a shovel.

Denise, excited at the new footage, offers to produce the film and use part of her conveniently timed inheritance to finish it. She also reveals she's known Georges was a fraud since they met. After buying him a pair of deerskin gloves, she films him preening in his full outfit on a roadside hill. From the other side of the hill, the mute boy's father suddenly shoots Georges in the head with a hunting rifle. Denise continues filming as she takes the jacket off Georges' corpse and dons it.

In a mid-credits scene, Georges films himself with his jacket as he approaches a herd of deer. While Georges cannot see the image on the digital camcorder, it zooms in twice.

== Cast ==
- Jean Dujardin as Georges
- Adèle Haenel as Denise
- Albert Delpy as Monsieur B.
- Pierre Gommé as Nicolas
- Marie Bunel as Kylie
- Coralie Russier as Vic
- Laurent Nicolas as Norbert
- Youssef Hajdi as Olaf
- Julia Faure as Jeanne
- Thomas Blanchard as Michael
- Tom Hudson as Yann
- Stéphane Jobert as Adrien
- Franck Lebreton as David
- Panayotis Pascot as Johnny
- Maryne Cayon as Zita

== Production ==
In March 2018, it was announced Jean Dujardin had joined the cast of the film, with Quentin Dupieux directing from a screenplay he wrote. Shooting started in the same month in Sarrance in the Pyrénées Atlantiques region of France. It was also shot in the Aspe Valley and surrounding regions.

== Release ==
It had its world premiere at the Cannes Film Festival on 15 May 2019 in the Directors Fortnight section. It was released in France on 19 June 2019 by Diaphana Distribution. It went onto screen at the Toronto International Film Festival on 12 September 2019. Prior to, Greenwich Entertainment and Picturehouse Entertainment acquired U.S. and UK distribution rights to the film. It also screened at AFI Fest on 16 November 2019.

It was scheduled to be released in the United States on 20 March 2020. However, it was pulled from the schedule due to the COVID-19 pandemic. It is scheduled to be released in the United Kingdom on 16 July 2021.

Deerskin was released in France on Blu-ray, DVD, and VOD on 5 November 2019.

== Critical reception ==
Deerskin holds an 89% approval rating on review aggregator Rotten Tomatoes, based on 122 reviews, with an average of 7.2/10. The website's critical consensus reads, "Led by a daring performance from Jean Dujardin, Deerskin finds writer-director Quentin Dupieux working in a more accessible -- yet still distinctive -- vein." On Metacritic, the film holds a rating of 65 out of 100, based on 18 critics, indicating "generally favorable reviews".
