= Ali Marhyar =

French actor, film director and screenwriter

- Born: 28 February 1984 (age 42); Poissy, France
- Education: Cours Florent
- Occupations: Actor; film director; screenwriter
- Years active: 2008–present

Ali Marhyar (born 28 February 1984) is a French actor, film director and screenwriter. He is known for his roles in films such as 18 Years Old and Rising (2011), Zero Dark Thirty (2012), and As Above, So Below (2014). On television, he co-created, wrote and starred in Casting(s) (2013–2015), and had recurring roles in Candice Renoir (2015–2022), and Family Business (2019–2020). In 2023, Marhyar released his feature directorial debut, Like a Prince.

== Early life ==
Marhyar was born on 28 February 1984, in Poissy, a commune in the Yvelines department in the Île-de-France region in north-central France. Marhyar grew up in Les Mureaux and practiced boxing during his youth. He also obtained a black belt in judo.

In 2005, Marhyar enrolled in the French drama school Cours Florent. He joined the free class at Cours Florent after his second year and began writing scripts with his friend Pierre Niney, inspired by their first casting experiences.

== Career ==
In 2009, he made his feature film debut in Do Me Love, directed by Jacky Katu and Lou Viger.

In 2011, he co-starred with Pierre Niney in 18 Years Old and Rising, directed by Frédéric Louf. In 2012, Marhyar played a small part as an interrogator in Zero Dark Thirty, directed by Kathryn Bigelow.

In 2013, Marhyar co-created along with Pierre Niney and Igor Gotesman the comedy TV series Casting(s), which he also wrote and starred in. The series was broadcast by Canal+ in France between 2013 and 2015.

In 2014, he appeared in the American horror film As Above, So Below, directed by John Erick Dowdle.

He had recurring roles in the TV series Candice Renoir (2015–2022), and Family Business (2019–2020).

In 2023, Marhyar released his feature directorial debut, Like a Prince, starring Ahmed Sylla, Julia Piaton, Mallory Wanecque, Jonathan Cohen, and Antoine Gouy.

== Filmography ==
=== As actor ===
==== Film ====
Year	Title	Role	Director(s)	Notes
2008	La rue des Anges	Gang member	Jonathan Bensimhon	Short film
2009	Do Me Love	Medhi	Jacky Katu and Lou Viger	
2010	Black Heaven (L'Autre monde)	Ludo	Gilles Marchand	
2010	Amsterdam	Bacar	Philippe Etienne	Short film
2011	Les Lumières de la vie	Nadir	Kamel Abdous	Short film
2011	18 Years Old and Rising (J'aime regarder les filles)	Malik	Frédéric Louf	
2011	Elles	Saïd	Małgorzata Szumowska	
2012	Parle tout bas, si c'est d'amour	Le Prof. de Maths	Sylvain Monod	
2012	Porn in the Hood (Les Kaïra)	Mer relou centre commercial	Franck Gastambide	
2012	Zero Dark Thirty	Interrogator on Monitor	Kathryn Bigelow	
2014	As Above, So Below	Zed	John Erick Dowdle	
2014	Wild Life (Vie sauvage)		Cédric Kahn	
2015	Quelques secondes	Dragueur bar	Nora el Hourch	Short film
2015	L'heureuse élue	Nabil	Karima Gherdaoui and Anne Voutey	Short film
2015	On the Bench (Sur la touche)	Samir	Hortense Gélinet	Short film
2016	Five	Willy	Igor Gotesman	
2016	The Summer of All My Parents (Juillet août)	Chérif	Diastème	
2017	The Price of Success (Le prix du succès)	Lenny	Teddy Lussi-Modeste	
2017	The Ticket (Le ticket)	Aziz	Ali Marhyar	Short film
2018	Budapest	Rémi	Xavier Gens	
2018	Find Harbour For A Day	Romain	Paul Marques Duarte	Short film
2022	Les cadors	Policeman	Julien Guetta	

==== Television ====
Year	Title	Role	Notes
2011	E-Love	Student	TV film
2013–2015	Casting(s)	Ali	TV series; main cast
2014	The Goddess with Hundred Arms (La déesse aux cent bras)	The Emir's collaborator	TV film
2014	France KBEK	Raji	TV series
2015–2022	Candice Renoir	Mehdi Badhou / Abdelwahid	TV series; 71 episodes
2019	Voix de garage	Cicéron	Web-series
2019–2020	Family Business	Ali Benkikir	TV series; 12 episodes

=== As director ===
Year	Title	Credited as		Notes
Year	Title	Director	Screenwriter	Notes
2017	The Ticket (Le ticket)	Yes	Yes	Short film
2023	Like a Prince	Yes	Yes	Feature film

=== As screenwriter ===
Year	Title	Notes
2013–2015	Casting(s)	TV series; also co-creator along with Pierre Niney and Igor Gotesman
2015	On the Bench (Sur la touche)	Short film
2020	La Flamme	TV mini-series; 3 episodes

== Theatre ==
Year	Title	Role	Director	Stage	Ref.
2010	Négationnisme 1 : La loi	Sam	Jean-Luc Jeener	Théâtre du Nord-Ouest, Paris	
2012–2013	J'éprouve	Gaspard	Léon Masson	Théâtre 95, Cergy	
