= Goal of the Dead =

- Film poster
- Directed by: Thierry Poiraud; Benjamin Rocher
- Screenplay by: Tristan Schulmann; Marie Garel Weiss; Quoc Dang Tran; Ismaël Sy Savané; Laetitia Trapet
- Produced by: Raphael Rocher
- Starring: Alban Lenoir; Charlie Bruneau; Tiphaine Daviot; Ahmed Sylla; Alexandre Philip
- Cinematography: Matias Boucard
- Edited by: Dimitri Amar; Nathalie Langlade; Stephane Elmadjian
- Music by: Thomas Couzinier; Frederic Kooshmanian
- Production company: Capture the Flag Films
- Distributed by: Luminor
- Release date: 27 February 2014 (France)
- Running time: 120 minutes
- Country: France
- Language: French
- Budget: $4.4 million

Goal of the Dead is 2014 French sports horror comedy film directed by Thierry Poiraud and Benjamin Rocher; written by Tristan Schulmann, Marie Garel Weiss, Quoc Dang Tran, Ismaël Sy Savané, and Laetitia Trapet; and starring Alban Lenoir, Charlie Bruneau, Tiphaine Daviot, Ahmed Sylla, and Alexandre Philip as association football players and fans who must battle zombies when the entire stadium becomes infected.

== Plot ==
When a former local star returns home to play a match, he receives a hostile welcome. One of the local players is injected with infected steroids before the match, and he goes on a violent rampage. The stadium quickly turns into a massacre, and virus spreads to both players and spectators. The few uninfected humans battle to survive against the bloodthirsty zombies.

== Cast ==
- Alban Lenoir as Sam Lorit
- Charlie Bruneau as Solène
- Tiphaine Daviot as Cléo
- Ahmed Sylla as Idriss Diago
- Bruno Salomone as Marco
- Patrick Ligardes as Coubert
- Xavier Laurent as Manu Litrac
- Sebastien Vandenberghe as Jeannot
- Alexandre Philip as Pitt
- Philippe Rebbot as Fred
- Sarah Suco as The gruff woman

== Release ==
Goal of the Dead premiered 27 February 2014 in France, where it was released as two separate films. The two films were later combined for its festival screenings. International theatrical release dates are expected to coincide with the 2014 FIFA World Cup in June. It was scheduled to be released on home video in the UK on 7 July 2014.

== Reception ==
Jordan Mintzer of The Hollywood Reporter called it an "amusing and gory" film that suffers for its length. Andrew Pollard of Starburst rated it 8/10 stars and wrote, "Despite its ludicrous-sounding plot, Goal of the Dead is a massively enjoyable movie." Ben Bussey of Brutal as Hell called it "a perfectly entertaining film" that is "far longer than any light-hearted comedy horror movie really needs to be".
