= Wrong (film) =

- Film poster (c) Kevos Van Der Meiren
- Directed by: Quentin Dupieux
- Written by: Quentin Dupieux
- Produced by: Gregory Bernard; Charles-Marie Anthonioz; Nicolas Lhermitte; Josef Lieck
- Starring: Jack Plotnick; Éric Judor; Alexis Dziena; Steve Little; William Fichtner
- Cinematography: Quentin Dupieux
- Edited by: Quentin Dupieux
- Music by: Tahiti Boy; Mr. Oizo (Note: Dupieux's artistic name as a musician.)
- Production companies: Realitism Films; Canal+ Arte Cinema
- Distributed by: Drafthouse Films
- Release dates: January 21, 2012 (Sundance); March 29, 2013 (United States)
- Running time: 94 minutes
- Countries: France; United States
- Language: English
- Box office: $46,021

Wrong is a 2012 independent surrealist comedy film written and directed by Quentin Dupieux, who also shot, edited and co-scored the film. A French-American co-production, the film stars Jack Plotnick, Éric Judor, Alexis Dziena, Steve Little and William Fichtner. It premiered at the 2012 Sundance Film Festival and was part of the Toronto International Film Festival's Official Selection. Gregory Bernard, Charles-Marie Anthonioz, Nicolas Lhermitte and Josef Lieck served as producers.

== Synopsis ==
Dolph wakes up early in the morning in his suburban home to find that his dog is missing. Later on, in denial after losing his job, he recurrently returns to his place of employment and pretends to work while experiencing surrealistic changes and events in his life. In hopes of returning his life back to normal, he begins a search for his lost dog.

== Cast ==
- Jack Plotnick as Dolph Springer
- Éric Judor as Victor
- Alexis Dziena as Emma
- Steve Little as Detective Ronnie
- William Fichtner as Master Chang
- Regan Burns as Mike
- Mark Burnham as Cop
- Arden Myrin as Gabrielle
- Maile Flanagan as Pharmacist
- Barry Alan Levine as Gas Station Attendant

== Critical reception ==
It holds a 65% rating on Rotten Tomatoes based on 43 reviews, with an average rating of 6.1/10. The critical consensus states that "Wrong is strange and meandering, but its absurdist vignettes reveal a unique, wry wit."

Simon Abrams of Slant Magazine did not feel that the film worked:

The quasi-nihilistic, absurdist and totally surrealistic ideology behind Wrong, writer/director/editor/musician Quentin Dupieux's follow-up to Rubber, is more exciting in theory than it is in practice... It's only tempting whenever Wrong isn't actively devolving into an interminable laundry list of strange things that mostly prove how jaded Dupieux is.

However, Chase Whale of Twitch Film enjoyed the film:

Writer/director/composer/editor/cinematographer/auteur/weirdo Quentin Dupieux is a guy who pulls the mat right out from under the Hollywood norm and takes bold and colorful chances.... What makes Dupieux's movies so infectious is that in the wildly weird universe he creates, there is a brilliant undertone throughout all of the oddities happening.... Wrong will leave you strangely addicted to Dupieux's world.

== Soundtrack ==
Wrong (Original Motion Picture Soundtrack)

Soundtrack album by Tahihi Boy and Mr. Oizo
- Released: August 27, 2012
- Genres: House, Soundtrack
- Labels: Ed Banger Records; Because Music

The soundtrack to Wrong was produced by Quentin Dupieux under his stage name Mr. Oizo and French electro-rock music producer David Sztanke under the name "Tahiti Boy". Track 7 and 12 were produced by Sztanke's group "Tahiti Boy & The Palmtree Family".

== Track listing ==
No.	Title	Length
1.	"Wrong"	2:26
2.	"Ronnie"	2:13
3.	"Pizza Note"	2:33
4.	"Mind Link 1"	2:18
5.	"Mind Link 2"	3:04
6.	"Ringtone"	1:07
7.	"Solution"	3:43
8.	"Le Detective"	1:38
9.	"Turd Vision"	2:26
10.	"Phase 7"	3:18
11.	"Palmtree"	1:31
12.	"Resolution"	3:54
13.	"Master Chang"	1:10
