= Reality (2014 film) =

Film by Quentin Dupieux

- Theatrical release poster
- French: Réalité
- Directed by: Quentin Dupieux
- Written by: Quentin Dupieux
- Produced by: Josef Lieck; Diane Jassem; Kevos Van Der Meiren; Gregory Bernard
- Starring: Alain Chabat; Jonathan Lambert; Élodie Bouchez; Eric Wareheim; John Glover; Jon Heder
- Cinematography: Quentin Dupieux
- Edited by: Quentin Dupieux
- Music by: Thomas Garner
- Production companies: Realitism Films; Versus Production
- Distributed by: Diaphana Distribution (France); O'Brother Distribution (Belgium)
- Release dates: 28 August 2014 (Venice); 18 February 2015 (France); 15 February 2015 (Belgium)
- Running time: 87 minutes
- Countries: France; Belgium
- Languages: French; English
- Budget: €1.8 million
- Box office: $429,220

Reality (French: Réalité) is a 2014 surreal comedy-drama film written and directed by Quentin Dupieux. It stars Alain Chabat, Jonathan Lambert, Élodie Bouchez, Eric Wareheim, John Glover and Jon Heder.

The film premiered in the Horizons section of the 71st Venice International Film Festival on 28 August 2014. It was released in France on 18 February 2015 by Diaphana Distribution and in Belgium on 25 February 2015 by O'Brother Distribution.

== Plot ==
A wannabe director is given 48 hours by a producer to find the best groan of pain, worthy of an Oscar, as the only condition to back his film. Meanwhile, reality, dreams, and fiction repeatedly overlap.

== Cast ==
- Alain Chabat as Jason Tantra
- Jonathan Lambert as Bob Marshall
- Élodie Bouchez as Alice Tantra
- Kyla Kenedy as Reality
- Eric Wareheim as Henri
- John Glover as Zog
- Jon Heder as Dennis
- Matt Battaglia as Mike
- Susan Diol as Gaby
- Bambadjan Bamba as Tony
- Patrick Bristow as Klaus
- Sandra Nelson as Isabella
- Carol Locatell as Lucienne
- Erik Passoja as Billie
- Jonathan Spencer as Blue
- Lola Delon as Zog's Assistant
- Roxane Mesquida as Awards Hostess
- Michel Hazanavicius as Award Presenter
- Brad Greenquist as Jacques
- Axelle Cummings as The Receptionist
- Brandon Gage as Serge
- Raevan Lee Hanan as Luci

Thomas Bangalter, husband of Bouchez and former member of Daft Punk, has a cameo in the film. He plays the patient in the dermatologist's waiting room.

== Music ==
The soundtrack consists of only the first five minutes of "Music with Changing Parts" by Philip Glass.

This track by Philip Glass dates back to 1971. When you listen to it, in the film, it looks very simple but in reality it's a piece of almost 1h30 that keeps evolving in a subtle way. I only use the first five minutes. I could have made a Canada Dry music that imitates Philip Glass but it would have been much less inspired.

I listened to Philip Glass's entire discography. I was looking for the perfect thing and I fell in love with it. Given its duration, the idea at the beginning was to use several passages of the song, especially since we had managed to negotiate the rights with the publishers. But during the assembly I realized that if we do not have the start, the track is incomprehensible.

This way of using the first five minutes of the song creates an impression of endless loop, it becomes almost distressing. There is never a climax, we always come back to the same point. I came to this conclusion very quickly, on the set, even before thinking of Philip Glass. I did not want to do a BO, to accompany the film with small musical intentions as we usually do. You needed one piece of music that keeps coming back.

— Quentin Dupieux

== Release ==
Reality grossed $408,49 in France and grossed $423,619 worldwide.

=== Home media ===
Reality was released on 18 February 2015 on Blu-ray.

== Reception ==
On the review aggregator website Rotten Tomatoes, the film holds an approval rating of 64% based on 25 reviews, with an average rating of 6.1/10. The French cinema site AlloCiné gave the film a rating of 3.6/5 stars based on 32 reviews.

=== Critical response ===
Mark Adams of Screen Daily wrote: "Relishing its oddball sensibility, multi-hyphenate Dupieux takes his film into weird territory, and while perhaps not as knowingly tacky as Wrong Cops this new offering is a bizarre hybrid of horror and the surreal. Premiering at Venice, it will please his fans but leave others wondering what is going on."

Boyd Van Hoeij of The Hollywood Reporter wrote: "French director Quentin Dupieux is slowly but surely carving a niche for himself as the guy who makes weird-but-not-necessarily-funny movies, and his latest concoction, Reality (Realite), perfectly fits this description."

Peter Debruge of Variety wrote: "Turning its attention to Hollywood (sort of), Rubber director Quentin Dupieux's latest unfunny effort offers more heavy repetitive beats and surreal content."

Simon Abrams of the Chicago Sun Times wrote: "Reality is consistently effective because Dupieux seems to know exactly what he wants to say, no matter how juvenile or nonsensical.
