= Budapest (film) =

2018 film directed by Xavier Gens

- Theatrical release poster
- Directed by: Xavier Gens
- Written by: Manu Payet; Simon Moutairou
- Produced by: Julien Leclercq
- Starring: Manu Payet; Jonathan Cohen; Monsieur Poulpe
- Cinematography: Gilles Porte
- Edited by: Carlo Rizzo; Brian Schmitt; Nicolas Trembasiewicz
- Music by: Jean-Pierre Taïeb
- Production companies: Labyrinthe Films; Frères Zak Productions; Maje Productions
- Distributed by: Warner Bros. Pictures
- Release date: 27 June 2018
- Running time: 102 minutes
- Country: France
- Language: French

Budapest is a 2018 French comedy film directed by Xavier Gens. Two best friends with MBAs are bored in their jobs and start a travel business for bachelor parties in Budapest.

== Plot ==
Vincent and Arnaud are two best friends who once studied at the largest French business school. But today, they are very unhappy at their respective workplaces: Vincent works for a multinational corporation where he has no recognition, while Arnaud flounders at a firm run by his wife's father. During their friend's bachelor party, they meet a stripper. The latter tells them about her Hungarian hometown of Budapest, its nightlife, and its countless beautiful women. Lamenting over how their bachelor party should have been held there instead, Arnaud then comes up with the idea of creating a travel agency in partnership with Vincent that would organize getaway trips for French bachelor parties in Budapest: a city filled with oversized nightclubs where alcohol flows freely.

Vincent and Arnaud subsequently resign from their respective jobs and embark on this unprecedented adventure of starting up their new business venture, "Crazy Trips". They count on the help of Georgio, an expatriate in Budapest who will help them discover the debaucherous secrets of this city. After a difficult start, the "Crazy Trips" business grows. More and more clients are coming to Budapest where their experiences expand into evenings drunk off of Pálinka while dancing with strippers, driving tanks or shooting AK-47s at a shooting range. But all this takes a toll on Vincent and Arnaud's lives. They make repeated trips back and forth between Paris and Budapest and put their fraternal friendship as well as their marriages to the test.

== Cast ==
- Manu Payet as Vincent
- Jonathan Cohen as Arnaud
- Monsieur Poulpe as Georgio
- Alice Belaidi as Cecile
- Alix Poisson as Audrey
- Szandra Fejes as Marica
- Ali Marhyar as Rémi

== Release ==
The film was released by Netflix on March 1, 2019.

== Reception ==
TV Guide reviewer Jordan Hoffman sees the French Budapest as similar to the American The Hangover films, but set in Budapest. He writes, "The idea is to organize 'stag parties' for French bros who don't want to plan anything." The critic continues, "There's a little bit of realism and warmth in this dopey comedy" but "Budapest is light fare. It goes down easy but also isn't too memorable."
