= Family Business (French TV series) =

- Season 3 poster
- Genre: Comedy
- Created by: Igor Gotesman
- Starring: Jonathan Cohen; Gérard Darmon; Julia Piaton; Liliane Rovère; Enrico Macias; Louise Coldefy; Ali Marhyar; Olivier Rosemberg
- Composers: Paul-Marie Barbier; Julien Grunberg
- Country of origin: France
- Original language: French
- No. of seasons: 3
- No. of episodes: 18

Production
- Producers: François Kraus; Denis Pineau-Valencienne; Jérôme Cendro; Igor Gotesman
- Cinematography: Julien Roux
- Production company: Les Films Du Kiosque

Original release
- Network: Netflix
- Release: 28 June 2019 – 8 October 2021

Family Business is a French television series created and directed by Igor Gotesman. The plot revolves around a failed entrepreneur, Joseph (Jonathan Cohen), who finds out that cannabis is about to be legalized in France. He consequently decides to change the family kosher butcher shop into the first marijuana coffeeshop in France.

The show was ordered direct-to-series, and the first season premiered on Netflix on 28 June 2019. It was quickly renewed for a second season in July 2019 and released on 11 September 2020. Netflix renewed the series for a third and final season, which was released on 8 October 2021.

== Plot ==
Joseph wants to break out of his family's kosher butcher shop by starting a successful business, but he has had little success. At a party, he and his best friend, Olivier, encounter an old and annoying friend, Clém, who tells them that France will soon legalise marijuana. Later, they meet Clém in her apartment to ask her for more information. She tells Joseph that she will agree to help them if he can get her Olivier and 20,000 euros. Needing to convince Joseph's father, Gérard, to transform the failing butcher shop into a marijuana shop, Joseph and Olivier enlist help from Enrico Macias, Gérard's favorite singer. Enrico gets high with Gérard and convinces him. Gérard then drives to the Netherlands to see how things operate there, not knowing that Joseph is asleep in the back of the butcher van. Joseph's sister, Aure, grandmother Ludmila, Olivier, and their friend Ali have to collect the men from the Netherlands. Ludmila has an old friend in the Netherlands who grows cannabis, and she buys some clippings with her savings. Meanwhile, Joseph has been paying little attention to his girlfriend, Ali's sister, Aïda.

With Gérard on board, the Hazan family looks to raise money to pay off Clém so that she will have her minister father process their marijuana café application first. Joseph approaches Youssef, Ali and Aïda's ex-convict older brother. The family owns an old farm in the countryside, and they move their crops to a barn there, disguising the operation as a meat processing plant. Shortly after their arrival, the police announce that they are using nearby fields for training. One officer, Élodie, becomes romantically interested in Aure, who starts dating her without telling the rest of the family.

A drug lord, Jaures, has claimed France as her turf, and comes to threaten the family, kidnapping Olivier. They agree to give her some of their product in exchange for his release. Their business becomes successful due to Ludmila's cultivation skills. Joseph names the strain "Pastraweed". Jaures later returns, kidnapping Joseph's children and telling them they need to quit growing; the family convinces her to let them continue if they grow for her. Gérard starts dating a woman named Catherine. Ludmila suffers a stroke, and Aure impersonates her grandmother to conceal her absence. Élodie notices and demands Aure tell her what is happening. The family accidentally kill Jaures in self defence, turning her body into sausages to hide it. Their grow operation finally busted, the men of the family get sent to prison. Aïda, a lawyer, begins to investigate. Other prisoners respect the creators of Pastraweed but also want drug-related favours in exchange for protection, including a business meeting with their dead boss, Jaures. The family convince Catherine to pretend to be Jaures, which she does very convincingly.

Just as they are about to be released, the men are broken out of prison and, with Aure and Ludmila, who have been kidnapped off the street, flown to a monastery in a foreign country. Ali works with his siblings, Clém, and Enrico to track down the family from Paris. Catherine turns out to be a rival drug lord and poses as another hostage in order to obtain information from the Hazans. Ludmila has recovered and is taken away to grow Pastraweed for the cartel. To stop their captors from killing them, Joseph and Olivier convince them they have also been developing magic mushrooms, which they found growing around the mouldy plumbing. High on hallucinogens, the boys accidentally escape their prison, but the local corrupt police eventually return them to the monastery. Catherine has really fallen for Gérard and decides to help them escape, having put her son in charge while she plays victim. Aïda gets the French police to organise a rescue mission, knowing Catherine's affiliations and working out where they are being held.

== Cast and characters ==
- Jonathan Cohen as Joseph Hazan, a young man who desperately wants to escape working at his father's butcher shop
- Gérard Darmon as Gérard Hazan, Joseph's father, owner of a kosher butcher shop
- Julia Piaton as Aure Hazan, Joseph's sister
- Ali Marhyar as Ali Benkikir, Joseph's best friend
- Olivier Rosemberg as Olivier Pariente, an orphan raised by the Hazans.
- Liliane Rovère as Ludmila Rozenberg, Gérard's mother-in-law, Joseph and Aure's grandmother
- Louise Coldefy as Clémentine Cendron, an acquaintance of Joseph and Olivier
- Lina El Arabi as Aïda Benkikir, Ali's sister, Joseph's girlfriend, and Aure's best friend
- Tamar Baruch as Jaures, a drug boss
- Enrico Macias as Himself
- Ariane Mourier as Élodie, a gendarme
- Oussama Kheddam as Youssef Benkikir, Ali and Aïda's brother
- Alexandra Vandernoot as Catherine

== Episodes ==
Series	Episodes	Originally released
1	6	28 June 2019
2	6	11 September 2020
3	6	8 October 2021

=== Season 1 (2019) ===
No. overall	No. in season	Title	Directed by	Written by	Original release date
1	1	"Business Plan"	Igor Gotesman	Story by : Igor Gotesman, Olivier Rosemberg, Jonathan Cohen & François Uzan; Teleplay by : Igor Gotesman, Olivier Rosemberg & François Uzan	28 June 2019
2	2	"Deal"	Igor Gotesman	Story by : Igor Gotesman, Olivier Rosemberg, Jonathan Cohen & François Uzan; Teleplay by : Igor Gotesman, Olivier Rosemberg & François Uzan	28 June 2019
3	3	"Hog Wild"	Igor Gotesman	Story by : Igor Gotesman, Olivier Rosemberg, Jonathan Cohen & François Uzan; Teleplay by : Igor Gotesman, Olivier Rosemberg & François Uzan	28 June 2019
4	4	"Running to Seed"	Igor Gotesman	Story by : Igor Gotesman, Olivier Rosemberg, Jonathan Cohen & François Uzan; Teleplay by : Igor Gotesman, Olivier Rosemberg & François Uzan	28 June 2019
5	5	"Pastraweed"	Igor Gotesman	Story by : Igor Gotesman, Olivier Rosemberg, Jonathan Cohen & François Uzan; Teleplay by : Igor Gotesman, Olivier Rosemberg & François Uzan	28 June 2019
6	6	"End of the Line"	Igor Gotesman	Story by : Igor Gotesman, Olivier Rosemberg, Jonathan Cohen & François Uzan; Teleplay by : Igor Gotesman, Olivier Rosemberg & François Uzan	28 June 2019

=== Season 2 (2020) ===
No. overall	No. in season	Title	Directed by	Written by	Original release date
7	1	"Straight and Narrow"	Igor Gotesman	Story by : Igor Gotesman, Olivier Rosemberg, Jonathan Cohen & François Uzan; Teleplay by : Igor Gotesman, Julien Lilti, Olivier Rosemberg, Matthieu Rumani & Nicolas Slomka	11 September 2020
8	2	"Rival Gang"	Igor Gotesman	Story by : Igor Gotesman, Olivier Rosemberg, Jonathan Cohen & François Uzan; Teleplay by : Igor Gotesman, Julien Lilti, Olivier Rosemberg, Matthieu Rumani & Nicolas Slomka	11 September 2020
9	3	"The Broth"	Igor Gotesman	Story by : Igor Gotesman, Olivier Rosemberg, Jonathan Cohen & François Uzan; Teleplay by : Igor Gotesman, Julien Lilti, Olivier Rosemberg, Matthieu Rumani & Nicolas Slomka	11 September 2020
10	4	"Parting Gift"	Igor Gotesman	Story by : Igor Gotesman, Olivier Rosemberg, Jonathan Cohen & François Uzan; Teleplay by : Igor Gotesman, Julien Lilti, Olivier Rosemberg, Matthieu Rumani & Nicolas Slomka	11 September 2020
11	5	"South-facing"	Igor Gotesman	Story by : Igor Gotesman, Olivier Rosemberg, Jonathan Cohen & François Uzan; Teleplay by : Igor Gotesman, Julien Lilti, Olivier Rosemberg, Matthieu Rumani & Nicolas Slomka	11 September 2020
12	6	"Burrata"	Igor Gotesman	Story by : Igor Gotesman, Olivier Rosemberg, Jonathan Cohen & François Uzan; Teleplay by : Igor Gotesman, Julien Lilti, Olivier Rosemberg, Matthieu Rumani & Nicolas Slomka	11 September 2020

=== Season 3 (2021) ===
No. overall	No. in season	Title	Directed by	Written by	Original release date
13	1	"North Facing"	Unknown	Unknown	8 October 2021
14	2	"Showtime"	Unknown	Unknown	8 October 2021
15	3	"The Ten Commandments"	Unknown	Unknown	8 October 2021
16	4	"Boukha for Everyone"	Unknown	Unknown	8 October 2021
17	5	"As if by Magic"	Unknown	Unknown	8 October 2021
18	6	"Mazel Tov"	Unknown	Unknown	8 October 2021

== Reception ==
Cnaan Lipshiz in The Times of Israel and for the Jewish Telegraphic Agency wrote an overall positive review of the series and the way it explores French Jewish life, finding its comedy and premise similar to that of Breaking Bad. However, he felt the realist touches of the show were undermined by neglecting to explore relevant antisemitism in France as well as showing an uncommon friendship between the middle-class Jewish Hazan family and the working-class Muslim Benkakir family.
