= Ahmed Sylla =

French comedian and actor

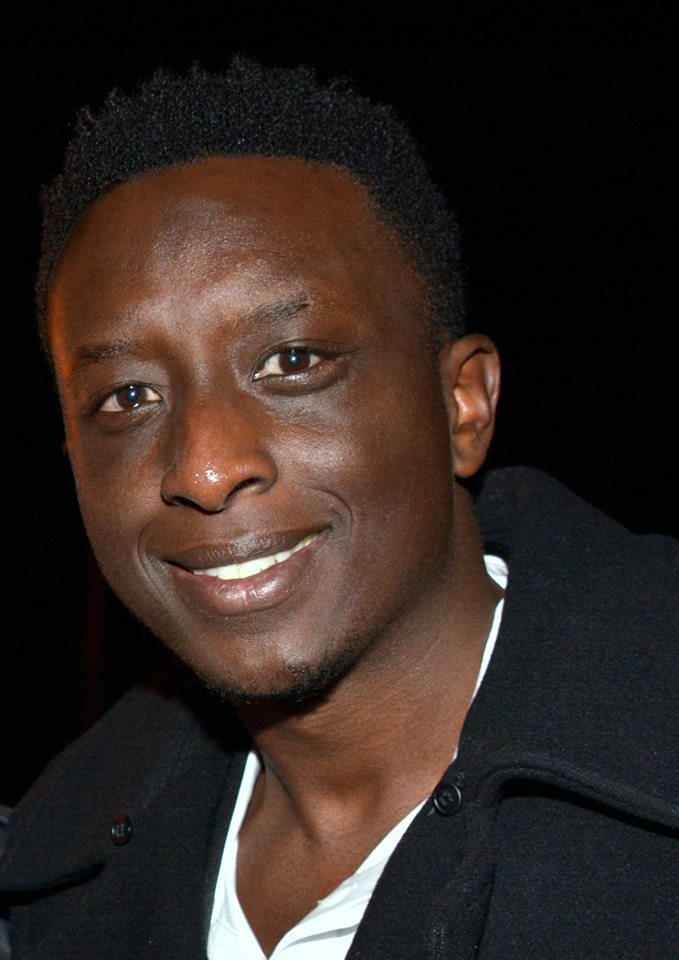
- Sylla in 2018
- Born: Nantes, France
- Occupations: Comedian & actor
- Years active: 2011–present
- Website: ahmedsylla.com

Ahmed Sylla is a French comedian and actor. In 2017, he received acclaim for his role in the film The Climb.

== Early life ==
Sylla's family originates from Senegal. He was born in Nantes, France, and grew up on the Dervallières housing estate there.

== Career ==
Sylla draws inspiration from leading French figures Louis de Funès, Raymond Devos and Coluche, as well as Canadian artists such as Michel Courtemanche and Jim Carrey, whose humour is based on their body language.

In 2010, he joined the Samba Show and performed in prestigious concert halls such as the Casino de Paris and the Bobino theatre.

In 2011, he went to a casting for the Laurent Ruquier's TV show On n'demande qu'à en rire (literally, "all we ask is to laugh") on France 2 (French channel). After being selected, first as Ahmed Sarko, he found his feet. He achieved celebrity in France by creating scenarios where he dresses up as crazy characters.

In 2012, he presented his first one-man show "A mes délires!"

In 2016 he toured a new one-man show, "Ahmed Sylla avec un grand A".

== One-man Show ==
| Year | Title | Author | Director |
|---|---|---|---|
| 2012-14 | À mes délires ! | Ahmed Sylla | Paul Boujenah |
| 2014-17 | Avec un grand A | Sacha Judaszko, Edouard Pluvieux & Ahmed Sylla | Caroline Duffau |
| 2018-19 | Différent | Thomas Pone, Varante Soudjian, Moussa & Ahmed Sylla | Moussa Sylla |

== Filmography ==
| Year | Title | Role | Director | Notes |
|---|---|---|---|---|
| 2014 | Goal of the Dead | Idriss Diago | Thierry Poiraud & Benjamin Rocher | |
| 2014-16 | Le juge est une femme | Noah | Akim Isker, Julien Zidi | TV series (19 episodes) |
| 2015 | Chez Ramzi | Ramzi | Guilhem Amesland | Short |
| 2017 | The Climb | Samy Diakhaté | Ludovic Bernard | |
| 2018 | Chacun pour tous | Stan | Vianney Lebasque | |
| 2018-19 | Access | Yanis Traoré | Varante Soudjian & Frédéric Scotlande | TV series (20 episodes) |
| 2019 | Le dindon | | Jalil Lespert | |
| 2019 | Trop de gens qui t'aiment | | Varante Soudjian | |
| 2023 | Like a Prince | Souleyman | Ali Marhyar | |
| 2026 | The Cat in the Hat | The Cat | Alessandro Carloni and Erica Rivinoja | French dub |
