= Jonathan Cohen (actor) =

French actor

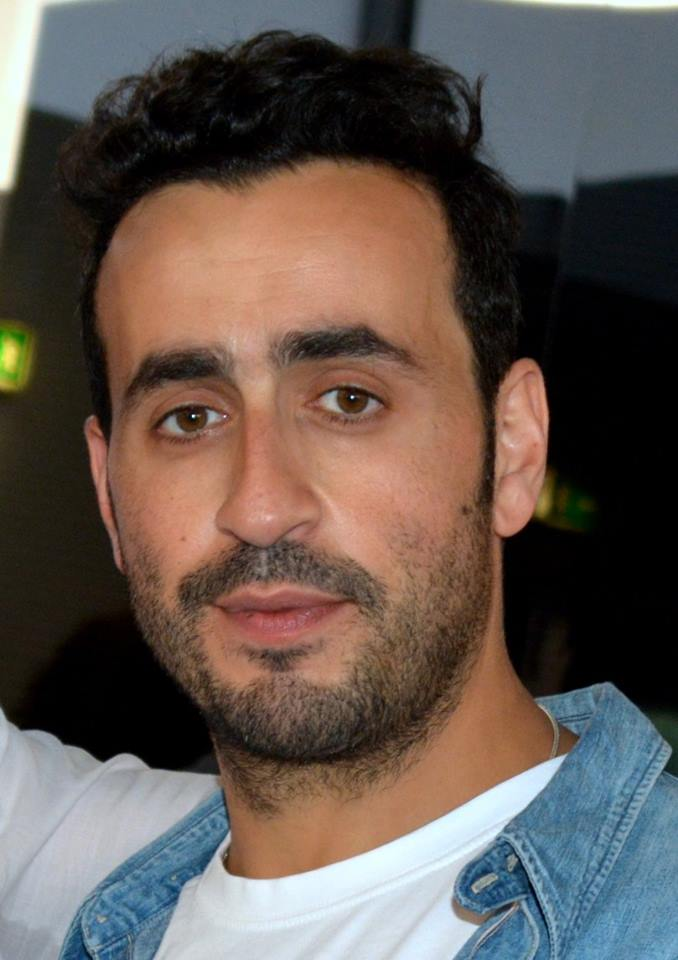
- Cohen in 2018
- Born: 16 June 1980 (age 46); Paris, France
- Occupations: Actor; Comedian
- Years active: 2008–present

Jonathan Cohen (born June 16, 1980) is a French film director, producer and actor.

He is known for co-starring in the Netflix prequel film to Army of the Dead, Army of Thieves (2021).

== Early life ==
Cohen was born in the 19th arrondissement of Paris in France, the only child to Sephardic Jewish parents. His father, a perfume retailer, and his mother, a bank worker, divorced when he was five. His grandfather was a rabbi. He was raised in Pantin in the northeastern suburbs of Paris. At the age of 18 he abandoned his commercial management studies and embarked on a series of jobs, including selling windows. He decided to pursue acting studies after being inspired by attending theatre improv. He had also been exposed to cinema from a young age by his cinephile rabbi grandfather, introducing him to the work of Luchino Visconti and Jean-Paul Belmondo.

He took classes at the stage school, les Ateliers du Sudden, founded by Raymond Acquaviva. In 2000 he enrolled at the Conservatoire national supérieur d'art dramatique.

== Filmography ==
=== Films ===
- 2009 : Partir : le banquier
- 2010 : Je l'aimais : le serveur
- 2010 : Le Village des ombres : Mathias
- 2010 : L'amour c'est mieux à deux : Le serveur lors de l'anniversaire de mariage
- 2012 : Il était une fois, une fois : le directeur des ressources humaines
- 2012 : Dépression et des potes : le professeur de yoga
- 2012 : Mains armées : Philippe
- 2012 : Un plan parfait : Patrick
- 2013 : Amour et turbulences
- 2013 : Pop Redemption
- 2013 : 16 ans... ou presque
- 2014 : Supercondriaque
- 2014 : La Crème de la crème
- 2014 : Quantum Love
- 2014 : Almost Friends
- 2015 : All Three of Us
- 2016 : La folle histoire de Max et Léon
- 2016 : Daddy or Mummy 2
- 2017 : Coexister
- 2018 : Amanda
- 2018 : Budapest
- 2018 : Ami-ami (film) de Victor Saint Macary : Frédéric
- 2019 : Terrible jungles
- 2019 : Enormous
- 2020 : Tout simplement noir
- 2021 : Army of Thieves
- 2022 : En même temps
- 2023 : Asterix & Obelix: The Middle Kingdom
- 2023: A Difficult Year (Une année difficile)
- 2023: Making Of
- 2023 : Daaaaaalí!
- 2023 : Sentinelle
- 2023 : Like a Prince : Gomez
- 2025 : Once Upon My Mother (Ma mère, Dieu et Sylvie Vartan)
- 2026 : Toy Story 5: Smarty Pants (Voice Only)

=== TV series ===
- 2010 : Fracture : David Haddad
- 2011 : Nerdz : Vendeur de Jeux vidéo
- 2011 : La Chanson du dimanche : Shouhil – Cyril
- 2011 : Les Invincibles : Hassan
- 2011 : Les 2 mecs qui bossent à Canal
- 2011 : Bref
- 2012 : Les Pieds dans le plat : Samuel Benhaim
- 2013 : Hero Corp : Julien
- 2016 : Serge le Mytho : Serge le Mytho
- 2019-2021 : Family Business : Joseph Hazan
- 2020 : La Flamme : Marc (also co-creator)
- 2022 : Le Flambeau : Les aventuriers de Chupacabra : Marc (also co-creator)
