= Ludovic Bernard =

French film director

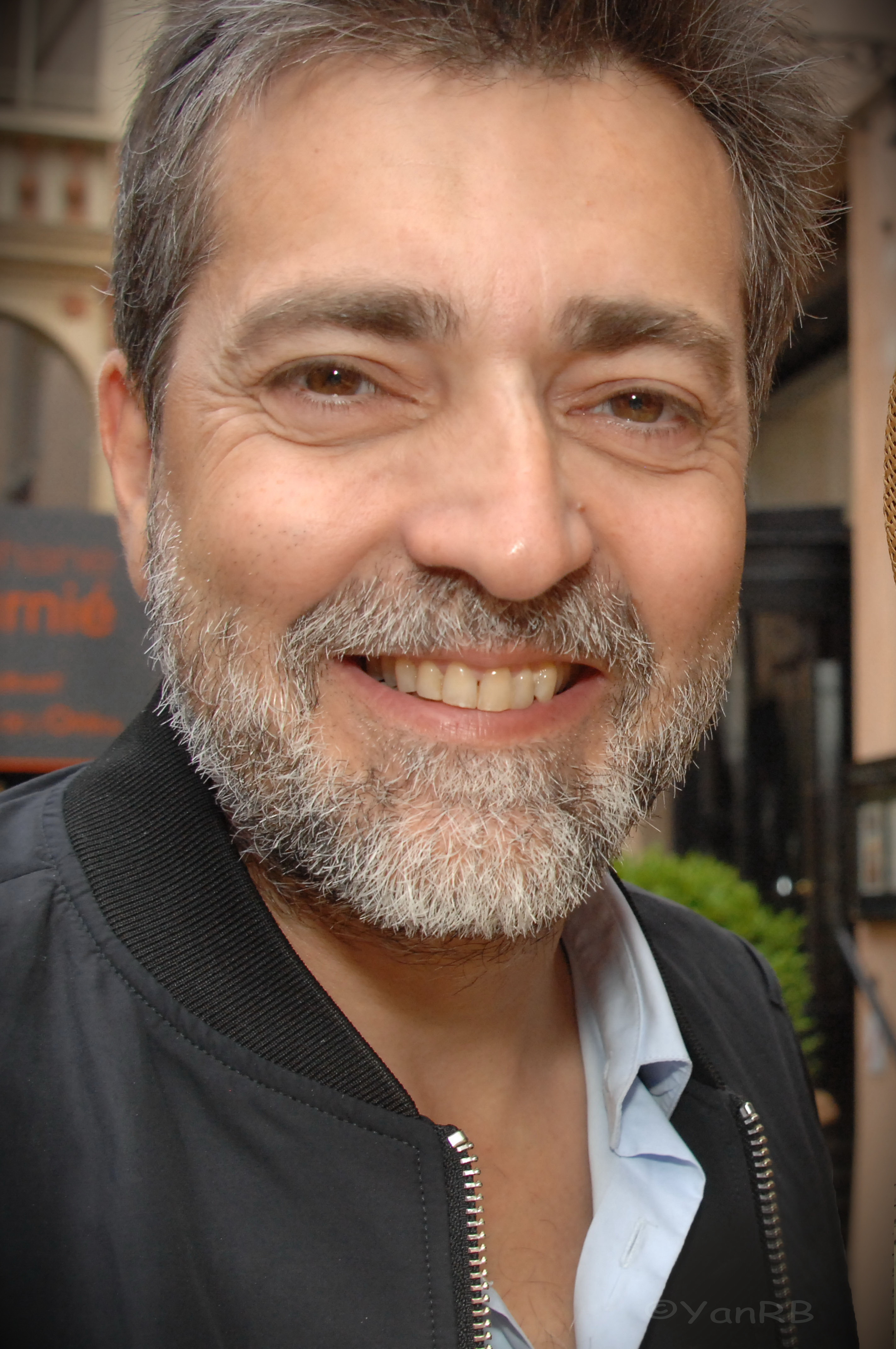
- Ludovic Bernard 2017
- Occupation: Director
- Years active: 1992–present

Ludovic Bernard is a French film director, and second unit director. He is best known for his 2017 film, L'ascension.

== Filmography ==
Year	Title	Role	Notes
1992	Amour et chocolat	Assistant director	TV movie
1992	Root Into Europe	Assistant director	TV series (2 episodes)
1992-1994	La guerre des privés	Assistant director	TV series (3 episodes)
1993-1994	Julie Lescaut	Assistant director	TV series (4 episodes)
1994	Le cascadeur	Assistant director	TV series (1 episode)
1994	Police Secrets	Assistant director	TV series (1 episode)
1995	La haine	Assistant director	
1996	La rançon du chien	Assistant director	TV movie
1996	Les allumettes suédoises	Assistant director	TV mini-series
1996	Lumière sur un massacre	Assistant director	TV series (1 episode)
1997	Assassin(s)	Assistant director	
1998	L'histoire du samedi	Assistant director	TV series (1 episode)
1999	New Dawn	Assistant director	
1999	La vie ne me fait pas peur	Assistant director	
2000	The Vertical Ray of the Sun	Assistant director	
2000	Liens de sang	Assistant director	TV movie
2002	La guerre à Paris	Assistant director	
2003	I, Cesar	Assistant director	
2003	Snowboarder	Assistant director	
2004	Arsène Lupin	Assistant director	
2005	Brice de Nice	Assistant director	
2005	The Black Box	Assistant director	
2005	L'anniversaire	Assistant director	
2006	Tell No One	Assistant director	
2007	Pur week-end	Assistant director	
2008	Mesrine	Assistant director	
2009	Le siffleur	Assistant director	
2010	22 Bullets	Assistant director	
2010	Little White Lies	Assistant director	
2011	The Lady	Assistant director	
2012	Taken 2	Assistant director	
2013	The Family	Assistant director	
2014	Lucy	Assistant director	
2014	Taken 3	Assistant director	
2014	3 Days to Kill	Assistant director	
2016	Nine Lives	Assistant director	
2017	The Climb	Director & writer	Alpe d'Huez International Comedy Film Festival - Audience Award - Best Film; Alpe d'Huez International Comedy Film Festival - Grand Prix - Feature Film
2017	Mission Pays Basque	Director	
2018	Au bout des doigts	Director & writer	
2020	10 jours sans maman	Director	
2023	10 jours encore sans maman	Director	
2026	Here & There	Director	
