= Étienne Chicot =

French actor and composer (1949–2018)

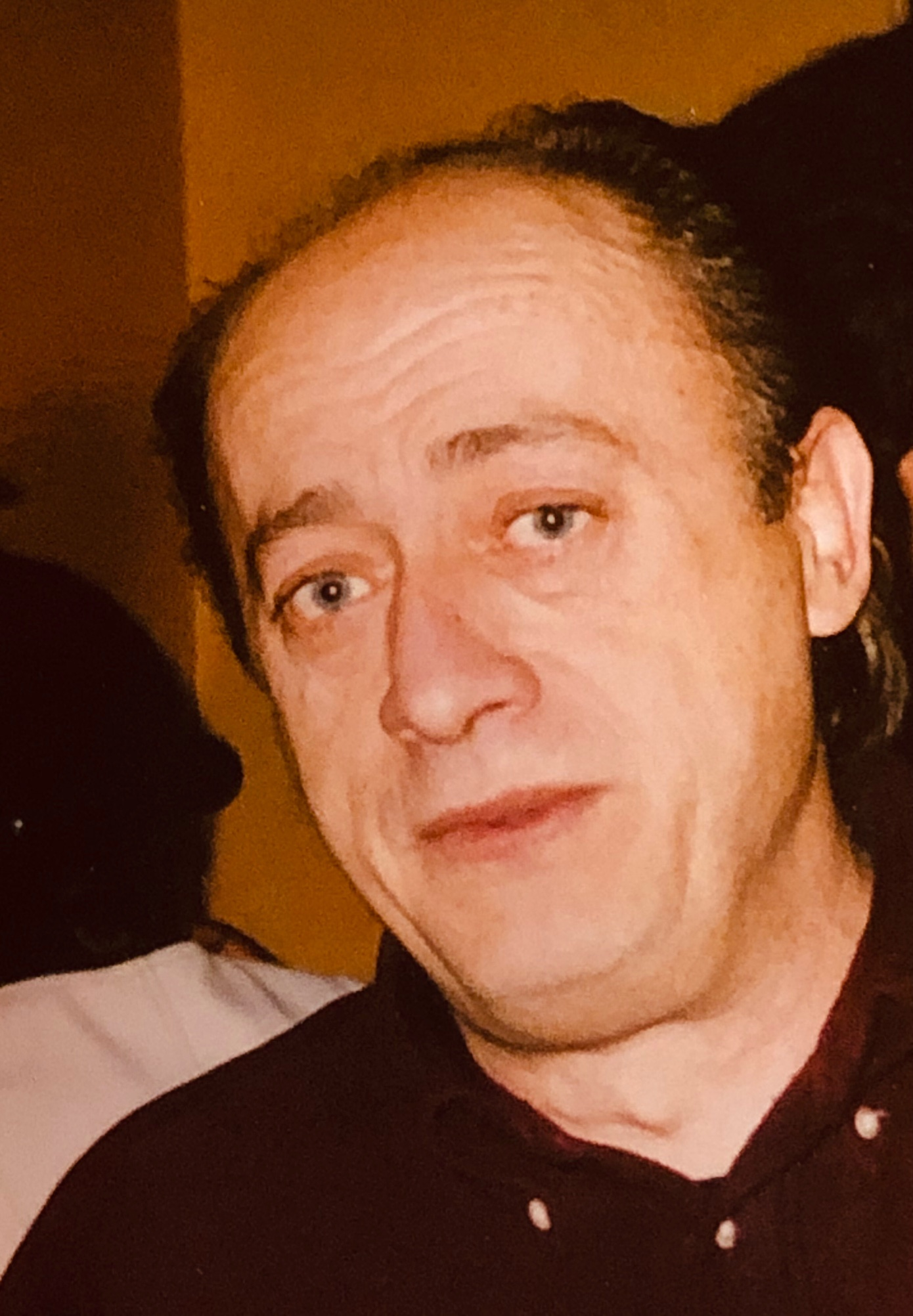
- Born: May 5, 1949; Fécamp, France
- Died: August 7, 2018 (aged 69); Paris, France
- Occupation: Actor
- Years active: 1973–2018

Étienne Chicot (5 May 1949 – 7 August 2018) was a French actor and composer.

== Filmography ==
| Year | Title | Role | Director | Notes |
|---|---|---|---|---|
| 1973 | Ras le bol | Philip Weber | Michel Huisman | |
| 1973 | L'agression | | Frank Cassenti | Short |
| 1974 | On n'est pas sérieux quand on a 17 ans | Lars | Adam Pianko | |
| 1975 | L'agression | A Motorcyclist | Gérard Pirès | |
| 1976 | The Good and the Bad | The Lieutenant | Claude Lelouch | |
| 1976 | Le plein de super | Charles | Alain Cavalier | |
| 1976 | Monsieur Klein | The Policeman | Joseph Losey | |
| 1977 | La fille d'Amérique | Bernard | David Newman | |
| 1977 | Dernière sortie avant Roissy | | Bernard Paul | |
| 1977 | Ne me touchez pas... | A Casting's Man | Richard Guillon | |
| 1977 | Au théâtre ce soir | Buck Wallace | Pierre Sabbagh | TV series (1 episode) |
| 1978 | Madame le juge | The Barman | Nadine Trintignant | TV series (1 episode) |
| 1978 | Le dernier amant romantique | Robert | Just Jaeckin | |
| 1978 | La tortue sur le dos | Jean-Louis | Luc Béraud | |
| 1978 | Médecins de nuit | Dr. Christophe Rossin | Philippe Lefebvre | TV series (4 episodes) |
| 1978 | La barricade du Point du Jour | Rigault | René Richon | |
| 1979 | Pierrot mon ami | Paradis | François Leterrier | TV movie |
| 1979 | Je te tiens, tu me tiens par la barbichette | The Singer | Jean Yanne | |
| 1979 | Le petit théâtre d'Antenne 2 | Various | Michel Hermant | TV series (1 episode) |
| 1979 | Le point douloureux | The Wiper Man | Marc Bourgeois | |
| 1979 | The Police War | Larue | Robin Davis | |
| 1980 | Girls | The Host | Just Jaeckin (2) | |
| 1980 | A Bad Son | Serge | Claude Sautet | |
| 1981 | Asphalte | Caron | Denis Amar | |
| 1981 | Une sale affaire | Florian | Alain Bonnot | |
| 1981 | Choice of Arms | Roland Davout | Alain Corneau | |
| 1981 | Pour la peau d'un flic | The Sneering | Alain Delon | |
| 1981 | Hotel America | Bernard | André Téchiné | |
| 1982 | Le bourgeois gentilhomme | The Music Master | Roger Coggio | |
| 1982 | Le Choc | Michel | Robin Davis (2) | |
| 1983 | Quelques hommes de bonne volonté | Laulerque | François Villiers | TV mini-series |
| 1983 | Deadly Circuit | Lerner | Claude Miller | Uncredited |
| 1984 | Cinéma 16 | Louis | Bernard Dubois | TV series (1 episode) |
| 1985 | Subway | | Luc Besson | (scenes deleted) |
| 1986 | Danger Passion | Paco | Philippe Triboit | TV movie |
| 1986 | L'été 36 | Polo | Yves Robert | TV movie |
| 1986 | Mort un dimanche de pluie | Christian | Joël Santoni | |
| 1986 | Désordre | Albertini | Olivier Assayas | |
| 1986 | Kamikaze | Samrat | Didier Grousset | |
| 1986 | Osa | Allan | Oleg Egorov | |
| 1987 | Les nouveaux tricheurs | The Director | Michael Schock | |
| 1987 | Duo solo | Denis | Jean-Pierre Delattre | |
| 1988 | 36 Fillette | Maurice | Catherine Breillat | |
| 1988 | Frequent Death | Roger | Élisabeth Rappeneau | |
| 1988-1990 | Eurocops | Jérôme Cortal | Roger Pigaut & Joannick Desclers | TV series (3 episodes) |
| 1989 | Après la pluie | Bertrand Cohen | Camille de Casabianca | |
| 1989 | L'orchestre rouge | Grossvogel | Jacques Rouffio | |
| 1990 | Six crimes sans assassins | Charasse | Bernard Stora | TV movie |
| 1990 | Dancing Machine | Le Guellec | Gilles Béhat | |
| 1991 | Le vent de la Toussaint | Doctor Marc Helluin | Gilles Béhat (2) | |
| 1991 | Meeting Venus | Toushkau | István Szabó | |
| 1991 | Rossignol de mes amours | | Christian Merret-Palmair | Short |
| 1992 | La nuit de l'océan | Alain | Antoine Perset | |
| 1992 | Marie-Galante | | Jean-Pierre Richard | TV mini-series |
| 1993 | La fièvre monte à El Pao | Gual | Manolo Matji | TV movie |
| 1994 | Chien et chat | Capelli | Marc Simenon | TV series (1 episode) |
| 1994 | L'été de Zora | Marc | Marc Rivière | TV movie |
| 1994 | Marie s'en va t-en guerre | Léon | David Delrieux | TV movie |
| 1994 | Oh God, Women Are So Loving | Arthur | Magali Clément | |
| 1994 | Éclats de famille | Paul | Didier Grousset (2) | TV movie |
| 1994 | 3000 scénarios contre un virus | | Daniel Vigne | TV series (1 episode) |
| 1995 | Maigret | Fred | Pierre Granier-Deferre | TV series (1 episode) |
| 1995 | Bons baisers de Suzanne | | Christian Merret-Palmair (2) | Short |
| 1996 | Le secret de Julia | Jean | Philomène Esposito | TV movie |
| 1997 | Un homme | Germain | Robert Mazoyer | TV movie |
| 1997 | Impair, passe et manque | Gino | Charlotte Walior | Short |
| 1998 | Une semaine au salon | Gilbert | Dominique Baron | TV movie |
| 1999 | Furia | Quicailler | Alexandre Aja | |
| 1999 | Innocent | The Taxi Driver | Costa Natsis | |
| 2000 | Les Cordier, juge et flic | Robert | Henri Helman | TV series (1 episode) |
| 2000 | Le p'tit bleu | Lucien Lourmel | François Vautier | TV movie |
| 2001 | Comme un silence | The Man | Dominique Guillo | Short |
| 2001 | Les portes de la gloire | Patrick Sergent | Christian Merret-Palmair (3) | |
| 2001 | Vices & Services | | Olivier Soler | Short |
| 2002 | Entre chiens et loups | Carreras | Alexandre Arcady | |
| 2003 | Navarro | Haussengat | Patrick Jamain | TV series (1 episode) |
| 2003 | Gomez & Tavarès | Commissioner Cagnoty | Gilles Paquet-Brenner | |
| 2003 | À la petite semaine | Marcel | Sam Karmann | |
| 2003 | Inquiétudes | Bruno's Uncle | Gilles Bourdos | |
| 2003 | Commissaire Moulin | Guy Giuliani | Joyce Buñuel | TV series (1 episode) |
| 2003 | Allez la Saussouze ! | The President | Eric Fourniols & Vincent Manniez | TV series (1 episode) |
| 2004 | Louis la brocante | Martin Blanchard | Michel Favart | TV series (1 episode) |
| 2004 | La crim' | Fabre | Dominique Guillo (2) | TV series (1 episode) |
| 2004 | Petits mythes urbains | The Doctor | Dominic Bachy & Stéphane Gateau | TV series (1 episode) |
| 2004 | Commissaire Valence | Levasseur | Patrick Grandperret | TV series (1 episode) |
| 2005 | Empire of the Wolves | Olivier Amien | Chris Nahon | |
| 2005 | Imposture | Ledoyen | Patrick Bouchitey | |
| 2005 | 3 jours en juin | Pierre Haudrusse | Philippe Venault | TV movie |
| 2005 | Palais royal! | The Photograph | Valérie Lemercier | |
| 2006 | The Da Vinci Code | Lieutenant Jérôme Collet | Ron Howard | |
| 2006 | Homicides | Jacques Schakovski | Christophe Barraud | TV series (1 episode) |
| 2006 | Écoute le temps | Monsieur Bourmel | Alantė Kavaitė | |
| 2007 | A Girl Cut in Two | Denis Deneige | Claude Chabrol | |
| 2007 | Ma fille est innocente | Lawyer Legrand | Charlotte Brandstrom | TV movie |
| 2008 | Transsiberian | The French | Brad Anderson | |
| 2008 | Hold-up à l'italienne | Koenig | Claude-Michel Rome | TV movie |
| 2008 | À l'aventure | The Bench Man | Jean-Claude Brisseau | |
| 2008 | Marie-Octobre | Lucien Issard | Josée Dayan | TV movie |
| 2009 | King Crab Attack | Raymond Santos | Grégoire Sivan | Short |
| 2009 | La différence, c'est que c'est pas pareil | Christian | Pascal Laëthier | |
| 2009 | Ticket gagnant | Guy Delsol | Julien Weill | TV movie |
| 2010 | Comme les cinq doigts de la main | Paul Angeli | Alexandre Arcady (2) | |
| 2010 | Coup de chaleur | Alain Somian | Christophe Barraud (2) | TV movie |
| 2010 | Le 3e jour | Commissioner Richaud | Bernard Stora (2) | TV movie |
| 2010 | Nicolas Le Floch | The Count of Rhodes | Nicolas Picard | TV series (1 episode) |
| 2011 | Low Cost | Monsieur Paul | Maurice Barthélemy | |
| 2011 | Case départ | Monsieur Jourdain | Lionel Steketee, Fabrice Eboué & Thomas N'Gijol | |
| 2011 | A Gang Story | The Greek | Olivier Marchal | |
| 2012 | Lili David | Alfred Bert | Christophe Barraud | TV movie |
| 2012 | A Perfect Plan | Edmond | Pascal Chaumeil | |
| 2012 | Angels | Michel | David Maltese | Short |
| 2014 | Supercondriaque | Professor | Dany Boon | |
| 2014 | Le crocodile du Botswanga | Jacques Taucard | Lionel Steketee & Fabrice Eboué (2) | |
| 2014 | On a marché sur Bangkok | Wanit Thu | Olivier Baroux | |
| 2015 | Chefs | Walter | Arnaud Malherbe | TV series (4 episodes) |
| 2016 | Hibou | Le patron de l'animalerie | Ramzy Bedia | |
| 2017 | Un sac de billes | Le curé | Christian Duguay | |
| 2017 | The Killer | Monsieur Blanchard | Marcelo Galvão | |
| 2018 | Black earth rising | Saint-Septus Abbey Abbott | Hugo Blick | TV series (Episode 2) |

== Theatre ==
| Year | Title | Author | Director | Notes |
|---|---|---|---|---|
| 1989 | Une absence | Loleh Bellon | Maurice Bénichou | Molière Award for Best Supporting Actor; Nominated - Molière Award for Most Prominsing Performer |
| 1995 | Noces de Sable | Didier Van Cauwelaert | Michel Fagadau | |
| 2009 | The Postman Always Rings Twice | James M. Cain | Daniel Colas | |
