= Liliane Rovère =

French actress (born 1933)

- Born: Liliane Cyprienne Cukier; 30 January 1933 (age 93); Paris, France
- Occupation: Actress
- Years active: 1964–present
- Spouse: Bibi Rovère (died 2007)

Liliane Rovère (née Cukier) (born 30 January 1933) is a French actress.

== Personal life ==
Liliane Rovère was born Liliane Cyprienne Cukier. Of Jewish origin, she hid in Catholic institutions under a fake name during the German occupation of France in World War II. Her parents survived the Holocaust, but many of her family did not.

Rovère's lifelong love of jazz began at the age of 12, when she began to frequent jazz clubs. At the age of 18, after a visit to the Club Saint-Germain, Rovère survived a rape by two acquaintances.

In 1954, Rovère's parents sent her to live with an uncle in the United States. She visited Birdland in New York City, where she met cool jazz trumpeter Chet Baker at the height of his fame and they began a romantic relationship. She lived with Baker and accompanied him on tour for two years, and he introduced her as his wife despite his existing marriage. The couple was frequently photographed together, including in a famous shot by William Claxton where Rovère, with a curly pixie cut and black dress, gazes at the viewer while resting her hand on Baker's head. The photograph appears as part of a collage on the cover of Chet Baker Sings and Plays. While on tour, Rovère caused a stir when she spent time with Black people in racially segregated St. Louis. Baker and Rovère's romance ended in 1956, when Baker informed her by mail that he'd married another woman.

A few years later, Rovère married jazz bassist Gilbert "Bibi" Rovère. In 1971, they adopted a daughter, who they named Tina.

After taking acting classes, Rovère began appearing as supporting characters on television and worked as a make-up artist in cinema and television.

In 1986, Rovère appeared as Madame Queen in Round Midnight, a film which features cameos by real-life jazz figures and stars bebop saxophonist, Dexter Gordon.

In 1998, Rovère received a Lutin, an award given to short films, for best actress in Christian Rouaud's Le Sujet.

In 2015, Rovère appeared as Arlette Azémar, a main character in Call My Agent!. Some of the role’s characteristics, such as a passion for jazz and a youthful romance with Chet Baker, are taken from Rovère's life.

Rovère published an autobiography in 2019 titled La folle vie de Lili.

In 2022, she supported the candidacy of Jean-Luc Mélenchon for the French presidential election.

== Filmography ==
Year	Title	Role	Director	Notes
1964	Christine ou La pluie sur la mer	Mina	Maurice Chateau	TV movie
1969	Les Cinq Dernières Minutes	The Girl	Claude Loursais	TV series (1 episode)
1971	Le portrait de Marianne	Fannyy	Daniel Goldenberg	
1971	Le tambour du Bief	Martine	Jean Prat	TV movie
1972	Raboliot	Flora	Jean-Marie Coldefy	TV movie
1972	Les Cinq Dernières Minutes	Jeanne Prinquiau	Claude Loursais	TV series (1 episode)
1973	The Day of the Jackal	Hotel Chambermaid	Fred Zinnemann	
1973	Une larme dans l'océan	The Mistress	Henri Glaeser	
1973	La chamaille	Emma	Jacques Pierre	TV movie
1976	Calmos	Soldier	Bertrand Blier	
1976	Andréa	The Hotel Manager	Henri Glaeser	
1976	Monsieur Albert	Madeleine	Jacques Renard	
1976	Je t'aime moi non plus	Motel Client	Serge Gainsbourg	
1976	Hôtel Baltimore	Avril	Arcady	TV movie
1977	March or Die	Lola	Dick Richards	
1977	Cinéma 16	Zaza	Jean Hennin	TV series (1 episode)
1978	La jument vapeur	Armelle's Friend	Joyce Buñuel	
1978	Get Out Your Handkerchiefs	Marthe	Bertrand Blier	
1978	Médecins de nuit	The Concierge	Philippe Lefebvre	TV series (1 episode)
1978	Messieurs les jurés	Dominique Blandy	André Michel	TV series (1 episode)
1978	Les procès témoins de leur temps	Anne Cotteron	Philippe Lefebvre	TV series (1 episode)
1979	Buffet froid	Josyane	Bertrand Blier	
1979	Une femme dans la ville	Madame Etchat	Joannick Desclers	TV movie
1980	La bande du Rex	Maria	Jean-Henri Meunier	
1980	Le Voyage en douce	The Voice	Michel Deville	
1980	Comment passer son permis de conduire	Rafaela Crépineau	Roger Derouillat	
1980	Les dossiers éclatés	Honorade Venette	Alain Boudet	TV series (1 episode)
1980	Julien Fontanes, magistrat	Rolande Gripport	Bernard Toublanc-Michel	TV series (1 episode)
1981	Sans famille	Fernande	Jacques Ertaud	TV series (1 episode)
1982	Enigma		Jeannot Szwarc	
1982	L'ours en peluche		Edouard Logereau	TV movie
1982	Joëlle Mazart	Marie Castano	Jean-Claude Charnay	TV mini-series
1982	Cinéma 16	Colette Dubreuil	Jean Hennin	TV series (1 episode)
1983	Pablo est mort		Philippe Lefebvre	TV movie
1984	Quidam		Gérard Marx	TV movie
1984	Mistral's Daughter	Woman	Kevin Connor & Douglas Hickox	TV mini-series
1984	Les enquêtes du commissaire Maigret	Mademoiselle Motte	Georges Ferraro	TV series (1 episode)
1985	Pour quelques je t'aime de plus		Marc Adjadj	Short
1986	Round Midnight	Madame Queen	Bertrand Tavernier	
1986	Nazi Hunter: The Beate Klarsfeld Story	Madame Kadousche	Michael Lindsay-Hogg	TV movie
1987	De guerre lasse	Bérénice	Robert Enrico	
1987	American Playhouse	Bordello Madame	Jill Godmilow	TV series (1 episode)
1987	Série noire	The Department Manager	Serge Moati	TV series (1 episode)
1988	Prisonnières	Pictures Woman	Charlotte Silvera	
1988	Black mic-mac 2	Madame Sauret	Marco Pauly	
1989	La Révolution française	Woman	Robert Enrico	
1989	Meurtre avec préméditation	Fabienne	Philippe Lefebvre	TV movie
1990	Les Cinq Dernières Minutes	Mado	Bernard Choquet	TV series (1 episode)
1990	Renseignements généraux	Mado	Philippe Lefebvre	TV series (1 episode)
1991	Les époux ripoux	Colette Brialy	Carol Wiseman	TV movie
1992	La Fille de l'air	Mother	Maroun Bagdadi	
1992	Les danseurs du Mozambique	The Maid	Philippe Lefebvre	TV movie
1992	Les genoux cagneux	Martha	Hervé Baslé	TV movie
1995	Adultery: A User's Guide	Simon's Mistress	Christine Pascal	
1995	Les grandes personnes	Madame Martinot	Daniel Moosmann	TV movie
1995	Les gens de Faillac	Mireille	Laurent Heynemann	TV mini-series
1995	Navarro	Rosy Gailland	Nicolas Ribowski	TV series (1 episode)
1995	C'est mon histoire	Suzanne	Dominique Tabuteau	TV series (1 episode)
1996	A Saturday on Earth	Claire's Mother	Diane Bertrand	
1996	Les Cinq Dernières Minutes	The Shrew	Jean-Marc Seban	TV series (1 episode)
1996	L'avocate	Fanny's Mother	Philippe Lefebvre	TV series (1 episode)
1997	Artemisia	The Rich Merchant's Wife	Agnès Merlet	
1997	Le sujet	Stella	Christian Rouaud	Short
1998	De l'art ou du cochon	The Proprietress	Yves Beaujour	Short
1998	Ici	Woman	Jérôme Bouyer	Short
1999	Lila Lili	The Director	Marie Vermillard	
1999	Voyages	Regine	Emmanuel Finkiel	
1999	Peut-être	Marie-Jeanne	Cédric Klapisch	
1999	Le bleu des villes	Solange's Mother	Stéphane Brizé	
1999	Venus Beauty Institute	Client	Tonie Marshall	
1999	Le plus beau pays du monde	Jewish Woman	Marcel Bluwal	
1999	Marc Eliot		Josée Dayan	TV series (1 episode)
2000	La Captive	Françoise	Chantal Akerman	
2000	Passionnément	Yvette	Bruno Nuytten	
2000	Harry, He's Here to Help	Michel's Mother	Dominik Moll	
2000	Recouvrance		Franck Saint-Cast	Short
2000	Mary Lester	Madame Le Fur	Christiane Lehérissey	TV series (1 episode)
2001	Veloma	Simone	Marie de Laubier	
2001	La fille de son père	The Secretary	Jacques Deschamps	
2001	Les fantômes de Louba	Paula	Martine Dugowson	
2001	Demain et tous les jours après	Lisa's Mother	Bernard Stora	TV movie
2002	L'idole	Gilberte	Samantha Lang	
2002	Seaside	Odette	Julie Lopes-Curval	
2002	Safe Conduct	Mémaine	Bertrand Tavernier	
2002	Froid comme l'été	Claire's Mother	Jacques Maillot	TV movie
2002	La crim'	Marguerite Zahl	Denis Amar	TV series (1 episode)
2003	Variété française	Eric's Grandmother	Frédéric Videau	
2003	À la petite semaine	Colette	Sam Karmann	
2003	Raining Cats and Frogs	The Old Frog	Jacques-Rémy Girerd	
2003	La bastide bleue	Mother Nicolet	Benoît d'Aubert	TV movie
2004	L'origine du monde		Erick Malabry	Short
2004	La nourrice	Pagevin	Renaud Bertrand	TV movie
2004	Nature contre nature	Rose	Lucas Belvaux	TV movie
2004	La crim'	Odette Prieur	Vincent Monnet	TV series (1 episode)
2004	Les Montana	Madame Suresne	Benoît d'Aubert	TV series (1 episode)
2005	Alex	Annie	José Alcala	
2005	Je vous trouve très beau	Madame Lochet	Isabelle Mergault	
2005	Le souffle	Grandmother	Mathieu Vadepied	Short
2006	J'invente rien	Claude	Michel Leclerc	
2006	Retrouver Sara	Cécile	Claude d'Anna	TV movie
2007	The Grocer's Son	Lucienne	Éric Guirado	
2007	La vérité ou presque	Liliane	Sam Karmann	
2008	Vilaine	Mélanie's Grandmother	Jean-Patrick Benes & Allan Mauduit	
2008	Anything for Her	Julien's Mother	Fred Cavayé	
2009	L'absence	Anna	Cyril de Gasperis	
2009	La grande vie	Véronique's Mother	Emmanuel Salinger	
2009	Eleanor's Secret	Wicked Fairy Carabosse	Dominique Monféry	
2009	Panique !	Marie Morisset	Benoît d'Aubert	TV movie
2010	Les Bougon	Gisèle	Sam Karmann	TV series (1 episode)
2011	Coup d'éclat	Fabienne's Mother	José Alcala	
2012	La Ville Lumière	Odette	Pascal Tessaud	Short
2012	Les chrysanthèmes sont des fleurs comme les autres	Huguette Pruvost	Yann Delattre	Short
2012	Quand les poules auront des dents	Bubulle	Bertrand Van Effenterre	TV movie
2013	La storia di Cino	The Curator	Carlo Alberto Pinelli	
2014	Brooklyn	Odette	Pascal Tessaud	
2014	Du grain à moudre	Mémé	Sonia Larue	Short
2014	Détectives	Chantal Duroy	Renaud Bertrand	TV series (1 episode)
2015	Le combat ordinaire	Marco's Mother	Laurent Tuel	
2015	Prozac tango	Lady Paname	Michaël Souhaité	Short
2015	Les yeux ouverts	Louise	Lorraine Lévy	TV movie
2015–2020	Call My Agent!	Arlette Azémar	Cédric Klapisch, Lola Doillon ...	TV series (24 episodes)
2017	Sales gosses	Josette	Frédéric Quiring	
2017	On l'appelait Ruby	The Patient	Laurent Tuel	TV movie
2017	Candice Renoir	Claudie	Adeline Darraux	TV series (1 episode)
2018	Dilili in Paris	Louise Michel	Michel Ocelot	
2018	Scènes de ménages	Françoise	Francis Duquet	TV series (1 episode)
2018	The Tunnel	Edith Dutheil	Gilles Bannier	TV series (2 episodes)
2019	Roxane	Auntie Simone	Mélanie Auffret	
2019	Damien veut changer le monde	Madame Lopez	Xavier de Choudens	
2019	Un café sans musique c'est rare à Paris	Madame	Johanna Pauline Maier	
2019	Les intranquilles	Françoise	Marie Vermillard	Short
2019-2020	Family Business	Ludmila Rozenberg	Igor Gotesman	TV series (12 episodes)
2020	Mama Weed	Patience's Mother	Jean-Paul Salomé	
2020	H24	Hélène Brossard	Octave Raspail	TV series (1 episode)
2021	Stuck Together	Louise	Dany Boon	
2021	À fleur de peau	Huguette Benamou	Jordan Anefalos	Short
2022	Maison de retraite	Sylvette Leroux	Thomas Gilou	
2024	Emily in Paris	Sylvie's mother		Season 4
2025	The Safe House		Lionel Baier	In competition at the 75th Berlin International Film Festival
2025	Dix pour cent (Call My Agent!, the Movie)	Arlette Azémar	Émilie Noblet	

== Theatre ==
Year	Title	Author	Director	Notes
1967	The Ghost Sonata	August Strindberg	Jean Gillibert	Théâtre de l'Alliance française
1969	Le Concile d’amour	Oscar Panizza	Jorge Lavelli	Théâtre de Paris
1970	Jeux de massacre	Eugène Ionesco	Jorge Lavelli	Théâtre Montparnasse
1985	Les Violettes	Georges Schehadé	Gilles Guillot	Théâtre de l'Athénée
1990	Grandma	Roberto Cossa	Jorge Lavelli	Théâtre national de la Colline
1994	Les Grandes Personnes	Olivier Dutaillis	Jean-Michel Vanson	Théâtre de Poche Montparnasse
2009	Minetti	Thomas Bernhard	Gerold Schumann	Théâtre de l'Athénée
