= Laurent Lafitte =

French actor and director (born 1973)

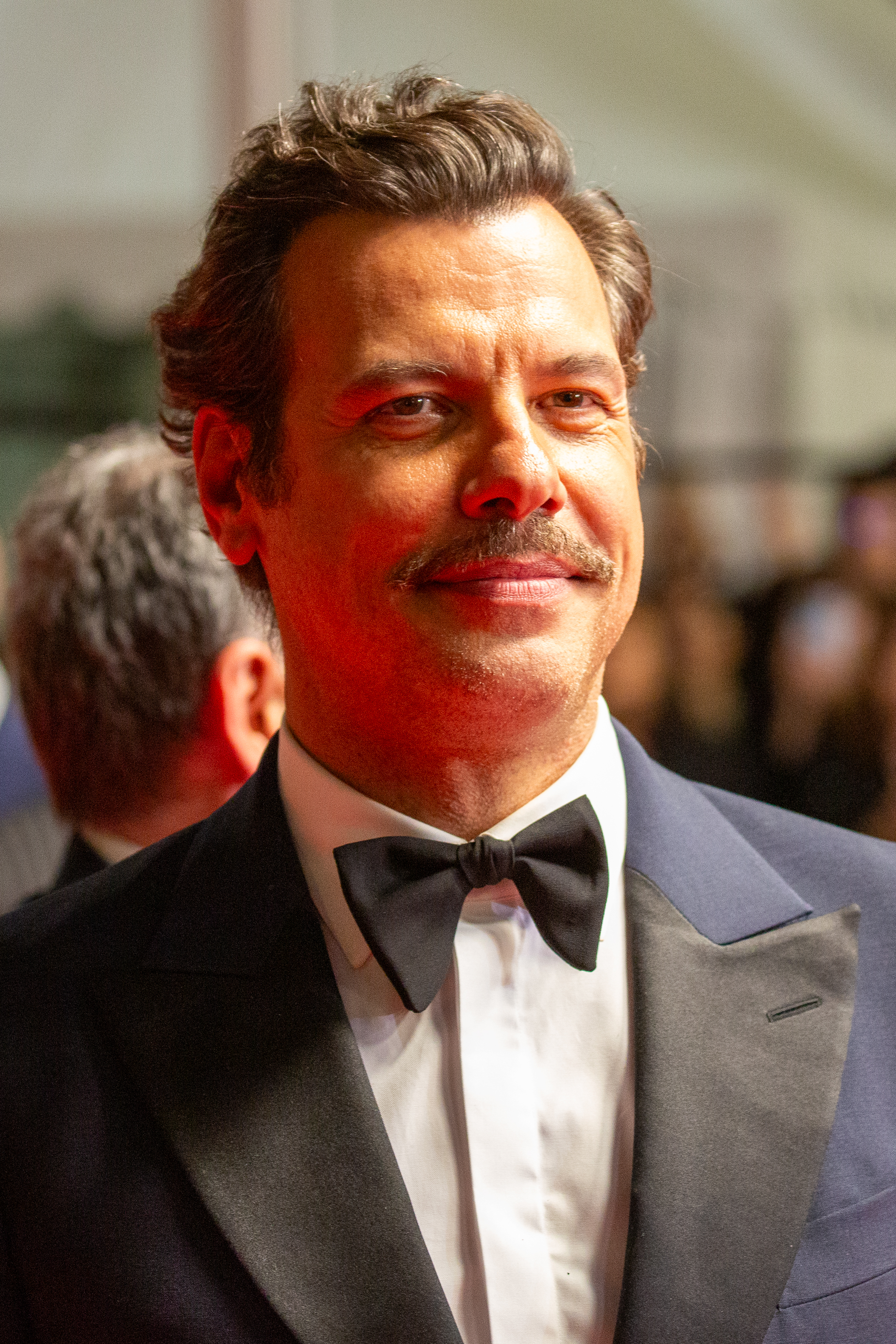
- Lafitte at 2025 Cannes Film Festival
- Born: Laurent Fabien Fernand Lafitte; 22 August 1973 (age 53); Paris, France
- Education: Conservatoire national supérieur d'art dramatique
- Occupation: Actor
- Years active: 1992–present

Laurent Fabien Fernand Lafitte (French pronunciation: [lɔʁɑ̃ lafit]; born 22 August 1973) is a French actor. He was nominated three times for the César Award for Best Supporting Actor for Elle (2016), See You Up There (2017), and The Count of Monte Cristo (2024), and won the César Award for Best Actor for The Richest Woman in the World (2025). In 2023 he starred in the Netflix mini-series Class Act (original name Tapie) as the French businessman and politician Bernard Tapie, earning him a nomination for the International Emmy Award for Best Actor.

Lafitte hosted the opening and closing ceremonies at the 2016 and 2025 Cannes Film Festival. From 2012 to 2024 he was a pensionnaire of the Comédie-Française.

== Filmography ==
=== Feature films ===
| Year | Title | Role | Director | Notes |
|---|---|---|---|---|
| 1998 | Le Plaisir (et ses petits tracas) | A guest | Nicolas Boukhrief | |
| 1999 | Belle maman | Franck | Gabriel Aghion | |
| 2000 | The Crimson Rivers | Hubert | Mathieu Kassovitz | |
| 2001 | Boomer | Didier | Karim Adda | Short |
| 2002 | Whatever You Say | Fabrice | Guillaume Canet | |
| 2003 | Les gaous | Bertrand | Igor Sekulic | |
| 2004 | The Role of Her Life | Arnaud | François Favrat | |
| 2004 | Narco | The host | Tristan Aurouet & Gilles Lellouche | |
| 2006 | Tell No One | The Basque | Guillaume Canet | |
| 2006 | Président | Deputy | Lionel Delplanque | |
| 2007 | A Secret | The cop | Claude Miller | |
| 2007 | Ma place au soleil | | Eric de Montalier | |
| 2007 | La 17ème marche | Lieutenant | Karim Adda | Short |
| 2007 | J'ai plein de projets | | Karim Adda | Short |
| 2008 | Le bruit des gens autour | Philippe | Diastème | |
| 2010 | Little White Lies | Antoine | Guillaume Canet | |
| 2010 | L'amour, c'est mieux à deux | Sylvain | Dominique Farrugia & Arnaud Lemort | |
| 2010 | Ensemble, c'est trop | Hervé | Léa Fazer | |
| 2011 | Une pure affaire | Brice Teller | Alexandre Coffre | |
| 2011 | Moi, Michel G., milliardaire, maître du monde | Joseph Klein | Stéphane Kazandjian | |
| 2012 | On the Other Side of the Tracks | François Monge | David Charhon | Also writer |
| 2012 | Mais Qui a tué Pamela Rose? | Perkins | Olivier Baroux & Kad Merad | |
| 2013 | Bright Days Ahead | Julien | Marion Vernoux | |
| 2013 | The Love Punch | Vincent Kruger | Joel Hopkins | |
| 2013 | Mood Indigo | CEO | Michel Gondry | |
| 2013 | 16 ans ou presque | Arnaud Mustier | Tristan Séguéla | |
| 2013 | Clean | Eric | Benjamin Bouhana | Short |
| 2013 | Turbo | Theo / Turbo | David Soren | French voice |
| 2014 | Asterix: The Land of the Gods | Duplicatha | Alexandre Astier & Louis Clichy | Voice; French version |
| 2014 | Fool Circle | Léon Camus | Vincent Mariette | |
| 2014 | Number One Fan | Vincent Lacroix | Jeanne Herry | |
| 2014 | The Easy Way Out | Antoine | Brice Cauvin | |
| 2014 | Monstre | The man | Stéphen Méance | Short |
| 2015 | Boomerang | Antoine Rey | François Favrat | |
| 2015 | Daddy or Mommy | Vincent Leroy | Martin Bourboulon | |
| 2015 | The Little Prince | The Conceited Man | Mark Osborne | Voice; French version |
| 2016 | Elle | Patrick | Paul Verhoeven | |
| 2016 | Daddy or Mommy 2 | Vincent Leroy | Martin Bourboulon | |
| 2017 | See You Up There | Captain Henri d'Aulnay-Pradelle | Albert Dupontel | |
| 2017 | The Extraordinary Journey Of The Fakir | | Ken Scott | |
| 2017 | K.O. | Antoine | Fabrice Gobert | |
| 2018 | Paul Sanchez est revenu! | Paul Sanchez | Patricia Mazuy | |
| 2018 | One Nation, One King | Louis XVI | Pierre Schoeller | |
| 2018 | School's Out | Pierre Hoffman | Sébastien Marnier | |
| 2020 | Dear Mother | Jean-Louis Bordier | Himself | |
| 2022 | Little Nicholas: Happy As Can Be | Jean-Jacques Sempé | Amandine Fredon, Benjamin Massoubre | Voice |
| 2022 | The Takedown | François Monge | Louis Leterrier | |
| 2022 | Everybody Loves Jeanne | Jean | Céline Devaux | |
| 2022 | For My Country | General Caillard | Rachid Hami | |
| 2024 | The Count of Monte Cristo | Gérard de Villefort | Matthieu Delaporte and Alexandre de La Patellière | |
| 2024 | Meet the Barbarians | Hervé Riou | Julie Delpy | |
| 2025 | A Magnificent Life | Marcel Pagnol | Sylvain Chomet | Voice |
| 2025 | The Richest Woman in the World | Pierre-Alain Fantin | Thierry Klifa | |
| 2026 | Call My Agent! The Movie | Himself | Émilie Noblet | |
| 2026 | The Good Lawyer | Léonard Landry | Tristan Séguéla | |
| TBA | My Duchess | | Mike Newell | Completed |
| TBA | Wake Me Up | | Himself | Filming |

=== Television ===
| Year | Title | Role | Director | Notes |
|---|---|---|---|---|
| 1992 | Premiers baisers | The man | Jacques Samyn | TV series (1 episode) |
| 1993 | Seconde B | Patrick | Christophe Gregeois | TV series (1 episode) |
| 1993 | Classe mannequin | Juan | Several | TV series (35 episodes) |
| 1998 | Avocats & associés | The lawyer | Philippe Triboit | TV series (1 episode) |
| 1999 | Bonne Nuit | Jan Lucas | | TV movie |
| 1999 | Coronation Street | Sacha | Adrian Bean | TV series (2 episodes) |
| 2002 | Caméra Café | Nicolas Carton | Francis Duquet | TV series (1 episode) |
| 2003 | Julie Lescaut | Valérie's husband | Bernard Uzan | TV series (1 episode) |
| 2004 | Joe Pollox et les mauvais esprits | Julien | Jérôme Foulon | TV movie |
| 2005 | Jeff et Léo, flics et jumeaux | Manu | Olivier Guignard | TV series (1 episode) |
| 2008 | Voici venir l'orage... | Andrei Kovner | Nina Companeez | TV mini-series |
| 2008 | Section de recherches | Paul Mathieu | Gérard Marx | TV series (1 episode) |
| 2012 | Birdsong | René Azaire | Philip Martin | TV mini-series |
| 2013 | Le débarquement | Various | Renaud Le Van Kim | TV series (1 episode) |
| 2023 | Class Act | Bernard Tapie | Tristan Séguéla | TV mini-series |
| 2025 | Asterix and Obelix: The Big Fight | Julius Caesar (voice) | Alain Chabat | Animated mini-series |

== Theatre ==
| Year | Title | Author | Director |
|---|---|---|---|
| 1994 | The Miser | Molière | Jacqueline Bœuf |
| 1994 | Jeffrey | Paul Rudnick | Raymond Acquaviva |
| 1995 | Croque-monsieur | Marcel Mithois | Raymond Acquaviva |
| 1999 | Much Ado About Nothing | William Shakespeare | Ben Duke |
| 1999 | Damn Yankees | Richard Adler & Jerry Ross | Gerry Tubbet |
| 2000 | Davina's Landed | Ben Duke | Ben Duke |
| 2001 | Célibataires | Rodolphe Sand & David Talbot | Rodolphe Sand |
| 2003 | The Imaginary Invalid | Molière | Gildas Bourdet |
| 2003 | Le Jour du destin | Michel del Castillo | Jean-Marie Besset & Gilbert Désveaux |
| 2004 | How the Other Half Loves | Alan Ayckbourn | Gildas Bourdet |
| 2006 | Un cheval | Jean-Marie Besset & Christophe Donner | Gilbert Désveaux |
| 2007 | Des gens | Raymond Depardon | Zabou Breitman |
| 2007 | Qu'elle aille au diable, Meryl Streep ! | Mohamed Kacimi & Rachid El-Daïf | Laurent Lafitte |
| 2008-11 | Laurent Lafitte, comme son nom l'indique | Laurent Lafitte & Cyrille Thouvenin | Laurent Lafitte & Cyrille Thouvenin |
| 2010 | Rendez-vous | Miklós László | Jean-Luc Revol |
| 2012 | Le Mariage | Nicolas Gogol | Lilo Baur |
| 2013 | Le Système Ribadier | Georges Feydeau | Zabou Breitman |
| 2013 | Candide | Voltaire | Emmanuel Daumas |
| 2013 | Other People's Heads | Marcel Aymé | Lilo Baur |
| 2014 | A Midsummer Night's Dream | William Shakespeare | Muriel Mayette |
| 2015 | Romeo and Juliet | William Shakespeare | Eric Ruf |

== Awards and nominations ==
| Year | Award | Category | Nominated work | Result | Ref. |
|---|---|---|---|---|---|
| 2024 | British Academy Television Awards | Best International Programme | Class Act | Won | |
| 2017 | César Awards | Best Supporting Actor | Elle | Nominated | |
| 2018 | César Awards | Best Supporting Actor | See You up There | Nominated | |
| 2025 | César Awards | Best Supporting Actor | The Count of Monte Cristo | Nominated | |
| 2026 | César Awards | Best Actor | The Richest Woman in the World | Won | |
| 2024 | International Emmy Awards | Best Actor | Class Act | Nominated | |
| 2024 | Molière Awards | Best Actor | Cyrano de Bergerac | Nominated | |
| 2026 | Molière Awards | Best Actor | La Cage aux Folles | Nominated | |

== Honours ==
- Knight of the Ordre national du Mérite (2022)
- Knight of the Ordre des Arts et des Lettres (2013)
