= Médecins de nuit =

- Genre: medical tv series
- Created by: Bernard Gridaine; Hervé Chabalier; Gilles Bression
- Directed by: Philippe Lefebvre (season 1)
- Starring: Catherine Allégret; Étienne Chicot; Georges Beller; Greg Germain; Brigitte Roüan
- Theme music composer: Vladimir Cosma
- Country of origin: France
- Original language: French
- No. of episodes: 38

Production
- Running time: 54 minutes

Original release
- Network: Antenne 2 (now France 2)
- Release: 22 September 1978 – 11 July 1986

Médecins de nuit is a French medical drama television series which aired between 22 September 1978 and 27 June 1986. It was originally televised on Antenne 2 station, which on 7 September was renamed France 2, and then rebroadcast later on M6, serieclub (a cable and satellite network in France) and Jimmy, a satellite digital television channel. Thirty eight 54 minute episodes were produced across 5 seasons. The creators were Bernard Gridaine (alias Bernard Kouchner), Hervé Chabalier and Gilles Bression.

The theme song was composed by Vladimir Cosma. Philippe Lefebvre directed the first season and as other seasons followed, by was succeeded by Bruno Gantillon, Peter Kassovitz, Nicolas Ribowski, Jean-Pierre Moscardo, Pierre Lary and Emmanuel Fonlladosa amongst others.

== Synopsis ==
This television series features a team of medical doctors who work at night during an emergency. Besides the medical angle, the series highlights the social issues of the Paris suburbs at the end of the 1970s.

== Cast ==
- Catherine Allégret : Léone
- Étienne Chicot : Dr. Christophe Rossin
- Georges Beller : Michel
- Agnès Château : Anne
- Greg Germain : Alpha
- Rémy Carpentier : Jean-François
- Brigitte Roüan : Hélène
- Philippe Rouleau : Patrick
- Anne Jolivet :season 3 : La pharmacienne
- Marcel Dalio :season 2
- Richard Anconina :season 2
- Hélène Vincent :season 1
- Jean-Pierre Castaldi :season 1
- Anémone :season 2
- Christophe Bourseiller :season 2
- Martine Sarcey :season 2
- Evelyne Bouix :season 2
- Jean-François Stévenin :season 2
- Gérard Lanvin :season 2
- Bernard-Pierre Donnadieu :season 2
- Madeleine Barbulée :season 3
- Éva Darlan :season 3
- Georges Chamarat :season 3
- Richard Bohringer :season 3
- Charles Gérard :season 3
- Jean-Pierre Kalfon :season 3
- Roland Blanche :season 4
- Michel Beaune :season 4
- Maurice Risch :season 4
- Dominique Zardi :season 4
- Paul Le Person :season 5
- Linda de Suza :season 5
- Gisèle Pascal :season 5

=== Guest ===
- Albert Delpy
- Dorothée Jemma
- Édith Scob
- Françoise Bertin
- Hélène Vincent
- Isabelle Sadoyan
- Katia Tchenko
- Liliane Rovère
- Magali Clément

== Episodes ==
=== Season 1 ===
1. Michel. Director: Philippe Lefebvre
2. Anne. Director: Philippe Lefebvre
3. Alpha. Director: Nicolas Ribowski
4. Jean-François. Director: Philippe Lefebvre
5. Hélène. Director: Peter Kassovitz
6. Christophe. Director: Philippe Lefebvre

=== Season 2 ===
1. Self-Defence. Director: Bruno Gantillon
2. Royal Palace. Director: Nicolas Ribowski
3. Henri Gillot, 62, retired. Director: Pierre Lary
4. The Red Book. Director: Nicolas Ribowski
5. Léone. Director: Bruno Gantillon
6. Disco. Director: Nicolas Ribowski
7. The Margiis. Director: Pierre Lary

=== Season 3 ===
1. Castel Factory. Director: Peter Kassovitz
2. The Convertible. Director: Jean-Pierre Moscardo
3. A Cooked Dish. Director: Peter Kassovitz
4. Financial Support for Michel. Director: Jean-Pierre Prévost
5. Amalgine. Director: Gilles Legrand
6. The Warehouse. Director: Jacques Tréfouël

=== Season 4 ===
1. A Spanish night. Director: Stéphane Bertin
2. The Rock Group. Director: Gérard Clément
3. Jo Formose. Director: Stéphane Bertin
4. Unpleasant Tricks. Director: Gérard Clément
5. The Lie. Director: Jean-Pierre Prévost
6. Quingaoshu. Director: Emmanuel Fonlladosa
7. The Last Night. Director: Emmanuel Fonlladosa

=== Season 5 ===
1. Chinese Night. Director: Jean-Pierre Moscardo
2. Panic. Director: Franz Josef Gottlieb
3. Password. Director: Emmanuel Fonlladosa
4. Marie-Charlotte. Director: Jean-Pierre Prévost
5. Happy birthday. Director: Jean-Pierre Prévost
6. Time Out. Director: Emmanuel Fonlladosa
7. Hep Taxi!. Director: Nicolas Ribowski
8. Disc-Jockey. Director: Franz Josef Gottlieb
9. Six brave Little Indians, Director: Franz Josef Gottlieb
10. Anguish. Director: Franz Josef Gottlieb
11. Wanted. Director: Franz Josef Gottlieb
12. The End As Always. Director: Franz Josef Gottlieb
