= Vincent Macaigne =

French actor and director

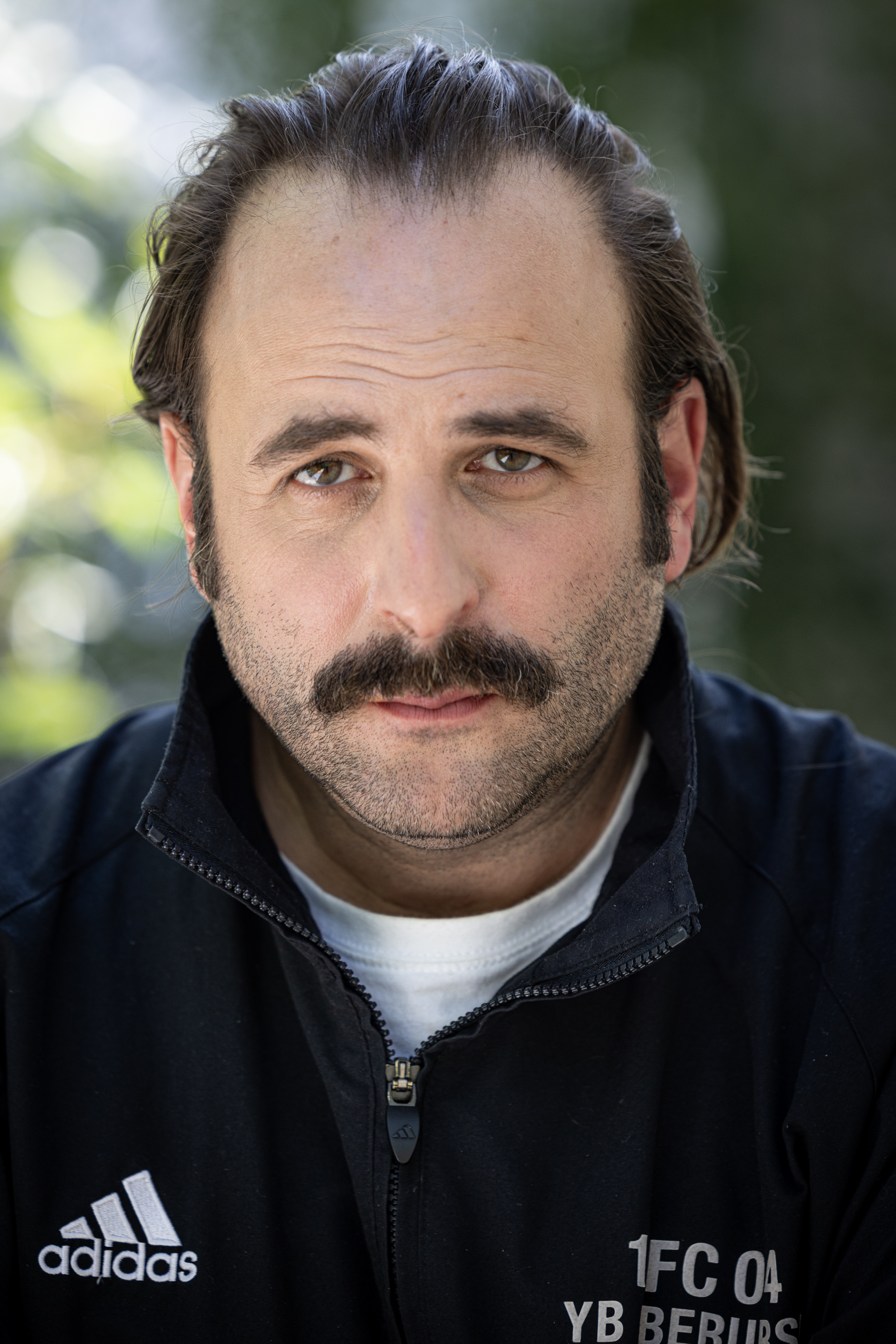
- Vincent Macaigne at the 2025 Cannes Film Festival
- Born: 19 October 1978 (age 47); Paris, France
- Occupations: Actor, Theatre director, Screenwriter, Film director, Playwright
- Years active: 1998–present

Vincent Macaigne (born 19 October 1978) is a French actor, theatre director and film director. He is also a screenwriter and playwright.

== Life and career ==
Macaigne was raised in Paris, the son of a French businessman and an Iranian-born painter. He has an elder brother, who is a forensic doctor. He attended the CNSAD between 1999 and 2002, and staged his first play in 2004. Throughout the 2000s, he acted in several theatre productions and also wrote and staged a number of plays. He suffered two strokes at just thirty years old, one of which occurred after his 2009 staging of the theatrical adaptation of Fyodor Dostoyevsky's The Idiot. In an interview, he said the stroke has had no lasting consequences to his health.

His short film What We'll Leave Behind (Ce qu'il restera de nous) won the Grand Prix at the Clermont-Ferrand International Short Film Festival, and was nominated for the César Award for Best Short Film.

In 2014, he received nominations for the César Award for Most Promising Actor and the Lumière Award for Best Male Revelation for his role in La Fille du 14 juillet.

His directorial feature film debut, Dom Juan, is an adaptation of the play of the same name by Molière. It was screened in the Cineasts of the Present section at the 2015 Locarno International Film Festival.

== Filmography ==
=== As actor ===
Year	Title	Role	Director	Notes
1998	Jeanne et le loup	Cyril	Laurent Jaoui	TV movie
2001	Replay	Henri	Catherine Corsini	
2002	Le doux amour des hommes	The server	Jean-Paul Civeyrac	
2004	Quand je serai star	The actor	Patrick Mimouni	
2007	24 mesures	The internal	Jalil Lespert	
2008	On War		Bertrand Bonello	
2008	Le jour où Ségolène a gagné	The Belgian	Nicolas Pariser	short
2008	Écrire pour un chanteur		Guilhem Amesland	TV series (1 episode)
2009	Le naufragé	Sylvain	Guillaume Brac	short
2011	A Burning Hot Summer	Achille	Philippe Garrel	
2011	Rives	Unhappy Customer	Armel Hostiou	
2011	La règle de trois	Vincent	Louis Garrel	short
2011	Un monde sans femmes	Sylvain	Guillaume Brac	short
2011	Moonlight Lover	Vincent	Guilhem Amesland	short
2011	I'm Your Man	Bruno	Keren Ben Rafael	short
2011	Goldman	Victor	Christophe Blanc	TV movie
2012	Crazy Pink Limo	The former lover	Joséphine de Meaux	short
2012	Le monde à l'envers	Thierry	Sylvain Desclous	short
2012	À l'ombre du palmier	The tourist	Bruno Veniard	short
2013	The Rendez-Vous of Déjà-Vu	Pator	Antonin Peretjatko	Nominated – César Award for Most Promising Actor; Nominated – Lumière Award for Best Male Revelation
2013	Age of Panic	Vincent	Justine Triet	Mar del Plata International Film Festival – Best Actor; Étoiles d'Or – Best Male Newcomer
2013	2 Autumns, 3 Winters	Arman	Sébastien Betbeder	
2013	Tonnerre	Maxime	Guillaume Brac	Bombay International Film Festival – Best Actor
2013	Kingston Avenue	Vincent	Armel Hostiou	short
2013	Les lézards	Léon	Vincent Mariette	short
2014	Eden	Arnaud	Mia Hansen-Løve	
2014	Fool Circle	Bruno Camus	Vincent Mariette	
2014	Truffaut au présent		Axelle Ropert	TV miniseries
2015	Two Friends	Clément	Louis Garrel	Nominated – Lumière Award for Best Actor
2015	Une histoire américaine	Vincent	Armel Hostiou	
2015	Le repas dominical	Jean	Céline Devaux	short
2016	Agnus Dei	Samuel	Anne Fontaine	
2016	News from Planet Mars	Jérôme	Dominik Moll	
2016	La Loi de la jungle	Marc Châtaigne	Antonin Peretjatko	
2016	Les philosophes		Guilhem Amesland	
2017	C'est la vie!	Julien	Éric Toledano and Olivier Nakache	
2018	Doubles vies	Léonard Spiegel	Olivier Assayas	
2020	Les Choses qu'on dit, les choses qu'on fait	François	Emmanuel Mouret	
2021	The Night Doctor (Médecin de nuit)	Mikaël	Élie Wajeman	
2021	Dear Mother	Michel Verdoux	Laurent Lafitte	
2021	Love Songs for Tough Guys (Cette musique ne joue pour personne)	Eric Lamb	Samuel Benchetrit	
2022	Irma Vep	René Vidal / Louis Feuillade	Olivier Assayas	TV miniseries
2022	En même temps	Pascal Molitor	Benoit Delépine & Gustave Kervern	
2022	Diary of a Fleeting Affair	Simon	Emmanuel Mouret	Nominated – César Award for Best Actor; Nominated – Lumière Award for Best Actor
2023	Bonnard, Pierre and Marthe	Pierre Bonnard	Martin Provost	
2024	Suspended Time	Paul Berger	Olivier Assayas	Premiered at the 74th Berlin International Film Festival
2024	Three Friends	Victor Harzouian	Emmanuel Mouret	
2025	Cicadas	Phillip	Ina Weisse	Screened in Panorama at the 75th Berlin International Film Festival.
2025	Arco	Dougie (voice)	Ugo Bienvenu	
2026	Call My Agent! The Movie	Himself	Émilie Noblet	

=== As filmmaker ===
Year	Title	Role	Notes
2012	Ce qu'il restera de nous	Director, writer, cinematographer & editor	Short; Clermont-Ferrand International Short Film Festival - Grand Prix; Clermont-Ferrand International Short Film Festival - Press Award; Clermont-Ferrand International Short Film Festival - Special Mention of the Youth Jury; Nominated - César Award for Best Short Film
2013	Kingston Avenue	Co-writer	Short directed by Armel Hostiou
2013	Mille pattes et crapaud	Animator	Short directed by Anna Khlmelevskaya
2015	Dom Juan	Director	Nominated - Locarno International Film Festival - Nescens Prize
2015	Une histoire américaine	Writer	Directed by Armel Hostiou
