= Call My Agent! The Movie =

2026 film by Émilie Noblet

- Release poster
- French: Dix pour cent, le film
- Directed by: Émilie Noblet
- Written by: Fanny Herrero; Lison Daniel; Violaine Bellet (Note: Collaboration); Benjamin Charbit
- Produced by: Dominique Besnehard; Aurélien Larger; Harold Valentin; Antoine Le Carpentier
- Starring: Camille Cottin; Laure Calamy; Thibault de Montalembert; Grégory Montel; Nicolas Maury; Fanny Sidney; Liliane Rovère
- Cinematography: Aurélien Marra
- Edited by: Clémence Carré
- Music by: Loïk Dury; Christophe "Disco" Minck
- Production companies: Mediawan - Mon Voisin Productions; Mother Production
- Distributed by: Netflix
- Release dates: 29 August 2026 (Angoulême Francophone Film Festival); 10 September 2026 (Netflix)
- Running time: 119 minutes
- Country: France
- Language: French

Call My Agent! The Movie (French: Dix pour cent, le film, lit. 'Ten Percent, the Movie') is a 2026 French comedy-drama film directed by Émilie Noblet and written by Fanny Herrero and Lison Daniel. The film serves as a sequel to the television series Call My Agent!, which aired on France 2 from 2015 to 2020. It features much of the original cast, alongside guest appearances by actors playing themselves, including George Clooney, Eva Longoria, Laetitia Casta, Vincent Macaigne, and Laurent Lafitte.

The film premiered at the Angoulême Francophone Film Festival on 29 August 2026. It was released on Netflix on 10 September 2026.

== Plot ==
Five years after the closure of the ASK talent agency, Andréa Martel has transitioned into film directing and is preparing to shoot her first feature film. However, just days before filming begins, her lead actor drops out, leaving her in a critical situation. Andréa reconnects with Noémie Leclerc, now a television producer, and must reunite her former team of agents to save her project, reigniting old friendships and rivalries. The shoot of the film she is directing is further disrupted by several on-set incidents and a legal proceeding that threatens her custody of her daughter.

== Cast ==
- Camille Cottin as Andréa Martel
- Laure Calamy as Noémie Leclerc
- Thibault de Montalembert as Mathias Barneville
- Grégory Montel as Gabriel Sarda
- Nicolas Maury as Hervé André-Jezak
- Fanny Sidney as Camille Valentini
- Liliane Rovère as Arlette Azémar
- Laetitia Casta as herself
- Vincent Macaigne as himself
- Laurent Lafitte as himself
- Anne Marivin as Élise Formain
- Ophélia Kolb as Colette Brancillon
- Eva Longoria as herself
- George Clooney as himself (uncredited)

== Production ==
=== Development ===
In September 2025, a film sequel was officially confirmed by its producers (Dominique Besnehard, Aurélien Larger, Harold Valentin, Antoine Le Carpentier), with Camille Cottin reprising her role as Andréa Martel, now a director, alongside most of the original series cast. The first guest stars, Laetitia Casta and Vincent Macaigne, were announced by Deadline magazine.

The screenplay was written by Fanny Herrero, creator and showrunner of the series, along with Lison Daniel. The film was directed by Émilie Noblet, known for the feature film Les 7 vies de Léa and the series Zorro starring Jean Dujardin.

=== Casting ===
On 25 October 2025, George Clooney confirmed his participation in the film to Le Parisien, stating, "I didn't hesitate for a second." A few days later, on 29 October 2025, Eva Longoria and Laurent Lafitte joined the cast alongside the original series cast.

Ophélia Kolb was also expected to reprise her role as Colette Brancillon. However, in May 2026, Canal+ reported that several supporting characters from the series would not appear in the film, including Sofia (Stéfi Celma), Colette (Ophélia Kolb), Hicham (Assaâd Bouab), Hippolyte (François Civil), and Catherine (Philippine Leroy-Beaulieu). Kolb ultimately did participate in the film.

=== Filming ===
Filming began in October 2025 and concluded in December 2025.

== Release ==
Call My Agent! The Movie premiered at the 19th Angoulême Francophone Film Festival in August 2026, before its global release on Netflix on 10 September 2026.

On 15 May 2026, Netflix had gathered the entire cast of the film, for an event, organised alongside the premiere of Karma, the film by Guillaume Canet screened out of competition at the 2026 Cannes Film Festival edition. The following day, May the 16th, an exclusive first clip from the film was revealed, showing Andréa Martel facing the withdrawal of her lead actor. On the same day, the main actors were also guests on the show C à vous on France 5 to discuss the project.

Prior to the festival, on 11 May 2026, Netflix revealed the first photographs of the film on its social media, featuring the entire original cast and guest stars Laetitia Casta and Vincent Macaigne.

On 20 May 2026, Netflix announced that the film would be released on 10 September 2026, exclusively on its platform and without a theatrical release. The official trailer is released on 24 August 2026.

== Critical response ==
Following its world premiere at the Angoulême Francophone Film Festival on 29 August 2026, Dix pour cent, le film received generally favourable but divided reviews from the French press, with critics particularly praising the returning cast while differing on the effectiveness of the film's story and its departure from the television series' format.

Le Parisien, which reviewed the film after its closing-night screening, gave a positive assessment of the reunion, writing that the characters' arguments, romances and rivalries had been missed during the six years since the series ended. The newspaper particularly highlighted Camille Cottin and Laure Calamy, whose careers had expanded considerably since the original series, and considered the return of the ensemble one of the film's principal strengths.

Première was also strongly positive. Reviewing the film as part of its coverage of the sixth and final day of the festival, Thierry Chèze praised Fanny Herrero's return to the screenplay and argued that the film succeeds in giving its numerous characters meaningful roles without making their reunions feel artificial. He singled out the pairing of Andréa and Noémie, played by Cottin and Calamy, whose contrasting personalities and comic performances form the film's central dynamic. The review also praised the appearances of Laetitia Casta, Vincent Macaigne and George Clooney, and concluded that the film retains the series' mixture of humour, cruelty and tenderness while bringing its characters' story to an emotional conclusion.

Canal+ offered a more qualified assessment. Its review noted that the film deliberately abandons much of the original series' agency-based structure: rather than principally following agents dealing with the careers and problems of their clients, the story moves onto the set of Andréa's first feature film, where production problems, personal conflicts and accidents drive the action. The change initially requires some adjustment, but the review ultimately praised the chemistry of the returning cast and identified Noémie as the film's standout character, with Calamy and Cottin forming its central comic partnership.

Ouest-France similarly emphasised the energy of the reunion. Its review of the Angoulême screening described the returning characters as retaining the personalities that made them popular in the series and presented the film as an energetic closing-night attraction. The newspaper also noted the significance of the screening taking place at Angoulême, where Dominique Besnehard, one of the festival's founders and a producer of the film, is closely associated with the event.

Not all reactions were as enthusiastic. TV Magazine described the reunion as appealing but argued that the film ultimately falls short of the original series, criticising what it considered a weaker storyline and less distinctive direction. The review nevertheless praised the chemistry between the actors and considered the return of the characters enjoyable, making the film's shortcomings more a matter of its story and execution than of the cast itself.

The reception was therefore broadly favourable toward the return of the ensemble and the performances, while more divided over whether the feature-length format and the shift from ASK's agency offices to a film set successfully reproduce the qualities of the original series.
