= Ophélia Kolb =

French actress (born 1982)

- Occupation: Actress
- Years active: 2005–present

Ophélia Kolb is a French actress.

== Career ==
She was nominated twice to the Molière Award for Best Supporting Actress, winning in 2019 for her role in The Glass Menagerie, directed by Charlotte Rondelez.

== Theatre ==
Year	Title	Author	Director
2005	Monsieur Kolpert	David Gieselmann	Hans-Peter Cloos
2005	Quel est l’enfoiré qui a commencé le premier ?	Dejan Dukovski	Dominique Dolmieu
2007	The Dance of Death	August Strindberg	Hans-Peter Cloos
2008	On ne badine pas avec l’amour	Alfred de Musset	Joël Dragutin
2009	Balkans’ Not Dead	Dejan Dukovski	Dominique Dolmieu
2010	Sonate inachevée pour deux jeunes mariées	Honoré de Balzac	Aurélie Toucas
2010–11	Yakish and Poupche	Hanoch Levin	Frédéric Bélier-Garcia
2011–12	La Princesse transformée en steak-frites	Christian Oster	Frédéric Bélier-Garcia
2012–14	The Seagull	Anton Chekhov	Frédéric Bélier-Garcia
2013	Barbe-bleue, espoir des femmes	Dea Loher	Alain Carbonnel
2016	La Médiation	Chloé Lambert	Julien Boisselier
2017–18	The Death of Tintagiles	Maurice Maeterlinck	Géraldine Martineau
2018–20	The Glass Menagerie	Tennessee Williams	Charlotte Rondelez
2019–20	Details	Lars Norén	Frédéric Bélier-Garcia
2022	Libre !	Irène Jacob	Géraldine Martineau
2022	Letter from an Unknown Woman	Stefan Zweig	Bertrand Marcos
2024	Moins forts	Aurélie Saada	Aurélie Saada

== Filmography ==
Film
Year	Title	Role	Director	Notes
2004	Pink Room	The girl	Alban Mench	Short
2007	Those Who Remain	Jennifer	Anne Le Ny	
2007	Dans leur peau		Arnaud Malherbe	Short
2007	Valériane va en ville	Valériane	Alban Mench	Short
2009	Juste un détour	Lucie	Pierre Renverseau	Short
2010	Dumas	Marion	Safy Nebbou	
2010	Gainsbourg: A Heroic Life	The model	Joann Sfar	
2011	Lilith	Rachel	Isabelle Noguera	Short
2011	Les Cybernautes rêvent-ils d'amours digitales?	Mélanie	Gilles Bindi	Short
2012	Associés contre le crime...	Gisèle	Pascal Thomas	
2012	Directed By	Charlotte Da Silva	Alban Mench	Short
2013	Gare du Nord	The mistress	Claire Simon	
2014	Never on the First Night	The hostess	Mélissa Drigeard	
2016	One Man and His Cow	Stéphanie	Mohamed Hamidi	
2016	Leçon de choses		Pierre Dugowson	Short
2017	Mr. & Mrs. Adelman	A birthday guest	Nicolas Bedos	
2017	Belle à croquer	The victim	Axel Courtière	Short
2017	Je suis boomerang		Sébastien Chamaillard	Short
2017	Jusqu'à écoulement des stocks		Pierre Dugowson	Short
2018	Amanda	Sandrine	Mikhaël Hers	
2018	Dinosaure		Pierre Dugowson	Short
2019	A Good Doctor	Marjolaine Joffrin	Tristan Séguéla	
2020	Le lion	Kelly	Ludovic Colbeau-Justin	
2020	2030		Pierre Dugowson	Short
2020	Summer time	The sister	Andra Tevy	Short
2020	Double Appel	Rose Vernon	Lucas Besnier	Short
2020	Il Medico Della Peste	The Covid	Amaury Voslion	Short
2022	Le torrent	Juliette Boiron	Anne Le Ny	
2022	The Passengers of the Night	Marie-Paule	Mikhaël Hers	
2022	Burnt	Tonja	Muriel Brunier	Short
2023	Toi non plus tu n'as rien vu	The prosecutor	Béatrice Pollet	
2023	Conte sauvage		Pierre Dugowson	Short
2024	Pandemonium	Julia	Quarxx	
2026	Call My Agent! The Movie	Colette Brancillon	Émilie Noblet	

Television
Year	Title	Role	Director	Notes
2007	Histoire d'une Fille de ferme	Margot	Denis Malleval	TV film
2009	Ce jour là, tout a changé	Lucile Desmoulins	Arnaud Sélignac	TV series (1 episode)
2010	La commanderie	Aygline	Didier Le Pêcheur	TV mini-series
2010	Profilage	Noémie Bertrand	Eric Summer	TV series (1 episode)
2010	Boulevard du Palais	Fleur	Thierry Petit	TV series (1 episode)
2010	Caméra café 2	Anne-Sophie Le Troarec	Yvan Le Bolloc'h, Bruno Solo, ...	TV series (300 episodes)
2012	Main courante	Adeline Podron	Jean-Marc Thérin	TV series (1 episode)
2014	The law of Barbara	Sarah Mayet	Didier Le Pêcheur	TV series (1 episode)
2014–16	La petite histoire de France	Ysabeau d'Arc	Vincent Burgevin & Jonathan Barré	TV series (13 episodes)
2015–20	Call My Agent!	Colette Brancillon	Antoine Garceau, Marc Fitoussi, ...	TV series (22 episodes)
2016	Prof T.	Gwen Quemeneur	Nicolas Cuche	TV series (1 episode)
2016	Duel au soleil	Julie Castelli	Didier Le Pêcheur	TV series (1 episode)
2017–19	On va s'aimer un peu, beaucoup	Audrey Lartigues	Julien Zidi & Stéphane Malhuret	TV series (16 episodes)
2018	Jusqu'à ce que la mort nous unisse	Servane	Delphine Lemoine	TV film
2020	César Wagner	Héloïse Wasserman	Antoine Garceau	TV series (1 episode)
2021	Jugé sans justice	Sophie Santini	Lou Jeunet	TV film
2021	On n'efface pas les souvenirs	Mikki	Adeline Darraux	TV film
2021	L'Homme que j'ai condamné	Inès	Laure de Butler	TV mini-series
2021	Jeune et golri	Nathalie	Fanny Sidney	TV series (3 episodes)
2021	Rebecca	Lucille Douvet	Didier Le Pêcheur	TV series (8 episodes)
2022	Ouija	Isabelle Peyrat	Thomas Bourguignon	TV mini-series
2022	Et la montagne fleurira	Zélie	Éléonore Faucher	TV mini-series
2022	Ce que Pauline ne vous dit pas	Pauline	Rodolphe Tissot	TV mini-series
2022	18h30	Jen	Maxime Chamoux & Sylvain Gouverneur	TV series (1 episode)
2022	50 nuances de Grecs	Cassandre	Mathieu Signolet	TV series (2 episodes)
2023	Meurtres aux îles de Lérins	Laure Castaldi	Anne Fassio	TV film
2023	Class Act	Michèle Tapie	Tristan Séguéla	TV mini-series
2023	Rictus	Céline	Arnaud Malherbe	TV series (1 episode)
2023	Panda	Lola	Jérémy Mainguy & Nicolas Cuche	TV series (6 episodes)
2024	Cat's Eyes	Angela Rupert	Alexandre Laurent	TV series

== Awards and nominations ==
Year	Award	Nominated work	Result
2016	Molière Award for Best Female Newcomer	La Médiation	Nominated
2019	Molière Award for Best Supporting Actress	The Glass Menagerie	Won
2020	Molière Award for Best Supporting Actress	Details	Nominated
