= The Courageous =

- Directed by: Jasmin Gordon
- Written by: Julien Bouissoux; Jasmin Gordon
- Produced by: Brigitte Hofer; Cornelia Seitler
- Starring: Ophélia Kolb; Paul Besnier; Arthur Devaux; Jasmine Kalisz Saurer
- Cinematography: Andi Widmer
- Edited by: Jan Mühlethaler
- Music by: Mirjam Skal
- Production company: Maximage
- Distributed by: Outside the Box
- Release date: 9 September 2024 (Toronto International Film Festival)
- Running time: 80 minutes
- Country: Switzerland
- Language: French

The Courageous is a 2024 Swiss drama film directed and written by Jasmin Gordon, in her directorial debut.

The film premiered at the Toronto International Film Festival on 9 September 2024.

== Synopsis ==
In a small town on the edge of wild country, an eccentric and delinquent mother has had enough of the rules. Crushed by her mistakes and by a society that doesn’t give a damn —or a second chance— to people like her, she’ll do anything to prove to her children, and to herself, that she still is a good person.

== Cast ==
- Ophélia Kolb
- Paul Besnier
- Arthur Devaux
- Jasmine Kalisz Saurer

== Release ==
=== Premiere ===
The Courageous premiered at the Toronto International Film Festival on 9 September 2024. The film was released in Montreal and Québec City on 11 April 2025, following a release in Toronto on 18 April. The film was additionally released in UK and Irish cinemas in September 2025.

=== Distribution ===
On 13 February 2025, MetFilm acquired the international sales for the film, as well as the UK and Irish distribution rights to the film. On 6 March 2025, New Mountain Films acquired the Canadian distribution rights to the film.

== Reception ==
Louisa Moore of Screen Zealots wrote "This is a poignant story about inequality and socioeconomic challenges that single parents often face, especially as they exist in a world that makes it nearly impossible to get a leg up. The story challenges perceptions of motherhood and morality, too".
