= Nicolas Vaude =

French actor (born 1962)

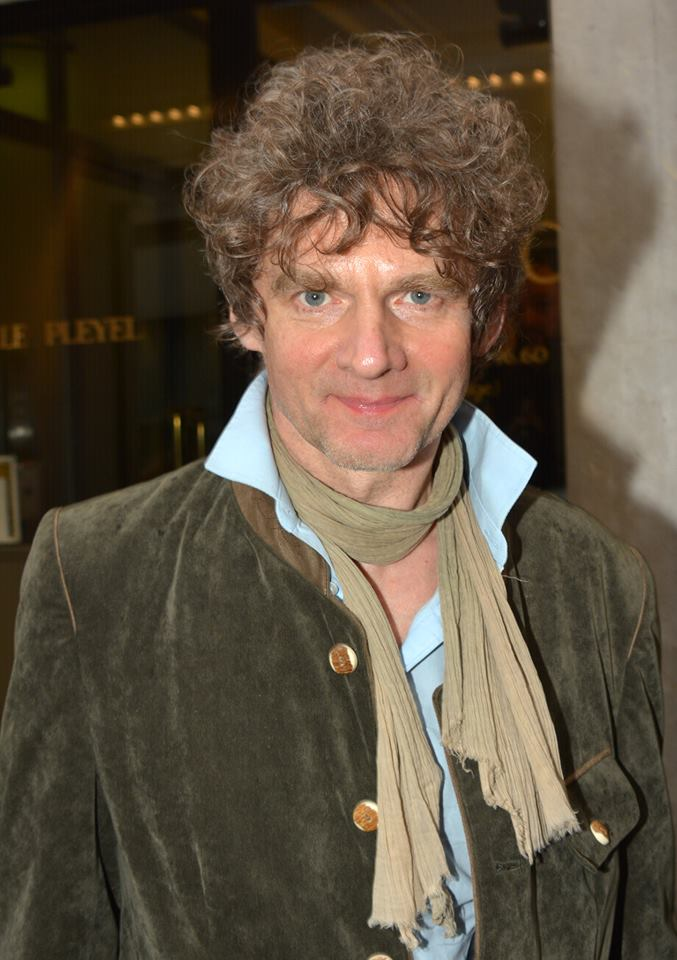
- Nicolas Vaude at the 2018 Molière Awards
- Born: 24 July 1962 (age 64); Paris, France
- Occupation: Actor
- Years active: 1986–present

Nicolas Vaude (born 24 July 1962) is a French actor.

== Filmography ==
Year	Title	Role	Director	Notes
1987	Travelling avant		Jean-Charles Tacchella	
1990	Clérambard	Viscount Octave de Clérambard	Marcel Bluwal	TV movie
1990	S.O.S. disparus	Christophe	Pierre Boutron	TV mini-series
1991	C'est quoi ce petit boulot ?	Yann	Michel Berny & Gian Luigi Polidoro	TV mini-series
1992	Les amies de ma femme	Charlie	Didier Van Cauwelaert	
1993	Jules Ferry	Lucien Leduc	Jacques Rouffio	TV movie
1994	La Reine Margot	A Protestant	Patrice Chéreau	
1995	Comment épouser un héritage ?	Charly	Patrice Ambard	TV movie
1996	Mon père avait raison	Charles & Maurice	Roger Vadim	TV movie
1997	An Air So Pure	Simon	Yves Angelo	
1998	Les moissons de l'océan	Lionel Levasseur	François Luciani	TV movie Rencontres Internationales de Reims - Best Actor
1999	Le destin des Steenfort	Léopold Garcin	Jean-Daniel Verhaeghe	TV mini-series
2000	Le coup du lapin	Édouard	Didier Grousset	TV movie
2000	Les faux-fuyants	Bruno Delors	Pierre Boutron (2)	TV movie
2000	Le juge est une femme	François d'Upsen	Pierre Boutron (3)	TV series (1 episode)
2001	Brotherhood of the Wolf	Maxime des Forêts	Christophe Gans	
2001	Madame De...	Charles	Jean-Daniel Verhaeghe (2)	TV movie
2001	L'Algérie des chimères	Fleury	François Luciani (2)	TV mini-series
2001	Navarro	Jean-Patrick	José Pinheiro	TV series (1 episode)
2002	La bataille d'Hernani	Fabre	Jean-Daniel Verhaeghe (3)	TV movie
2002	Sami	François	Patrice Martineau	TV series (1 episode)
2003	Bon Voyage	Thierry Arpel	Jean-Paul Rappeneau	
2003	Satan refuse du monde	Laurent Maubrel	Jacques Renard	TV movie
2003	Les Thibault	Meynestrel	Jean-Daniel Verhaeghe (4)	TV mini-series
2004	Happily Ever After	The disgruntled viewer	Yvan Attal	
2005	Gentille	The cafeteria's guy	Sophie Fillières	
2005	Désiré Landru	The investigating judge	Pierre Boutron (4)	TV movie
2005	La légende vraie de la tour Eiffel	Edouard Barbier	Simon Brook	TV movie
2006	Le Grand Charles	Paul Baudoin	Bernard Stora	TV mini-series
2006	Diane, femme flic	Marc Farelle	Jean-Marc Seban	TV series (1 episode)
2007	Molière	Monsieur	Laurent Tirard	
2007	Conversations with My Gardener	Jean-Etienne	Jean Becker	
2007	L'avare	The Arrow	Christian de Chalonge	TV movie
2007	Le clan Pasquier	Valdo	Jean-Daniel Verhaeghe (5)	TV mini-series
2008	Largo Winch	Gauthier	Jérôme Salle	
2008	John Adams	Chevalier de la Luzerne	Tom Hooper	TV mini-series
2008	Elles et Moi	Henri de Montellier	Bernard Stora (2)	TV mini-series
2008	Sœur Thérèse.com	Rémy Couty	Vincenzo Marano	TV series (1 episode)
2009	Coco Chanel & Igor Stravinsky	Ernest Beaux	Jan Kounen	
2009	La reine et le cardinal	Cardinal de Retz	Marc Rivière	TV movie
2009	La belle vie	Gus	Virginie Wagon	TV movie
2010	Imogène McCarthery	Andrew Lindsay	Alexandre Charlot & Franck Magnier	
2010	George et Fanchette	Eugène Delacroix	Jean-Daniel Verhaeghe (6)	TV movie
2010	Profilage	Antoine Grange	Eric Summer	TV series (1 episode)
2011	Largo Winch II	Gauthier	Jérôme Salle (2)	
2011	La croisière	The chaplain	Pascale Pouzadoux	
2011	Jeanne Devère	Claude Roy	Marcel Bluwal (2)	TV movie
2011	Le sang de la vigne	Baptiste Aludel	Marc Rivière (2)	TV series (1 episode)
2013	Marius	M. Brun	Daniel Auteuil	
2013	Fanny	M. Brun	Daniel Auteuil (2)	
2013	Boule & Bill	The Neighbor	Alexandre Charlot & Franck Magnier (2)	
2013	Une femme dans la Révolution	Jacques-Louis David	Jean-Daniel Verhaeghe (7)	TV mini-series
2014	Les Petits Meurtres d'Agatha Christie	Stanislas	Marc Angelo	TV series (1 episode)
2015	L'étourdissement	Coppi	Gérard Pautonnier	Short
2015	Nicolas Le Floch	Baldo	Philippe Bérenger	TV series (1 episode)
2016	Les Visiteurs: La Révolution	Maximilien Robespierre	Jean-Marie Poiré	
2016	M.		Sara Forestier	
2017	Le Brio	President of Panthéon-Assas University	Yvan Attal	
2018	Mrs. Mills	Edward	Sophie Marceau	
2019	A Good Doctor	Charles Schneider	Tristan Séguéla	
2023	Class Act	Coutanceau	Tristan Séguéla	TV mini-series

== Theater ==
Year	Title	Author	Director	Notes
1986–87	Clérambard	Marcel Aymé	Jacques Rosny	Nominated - Molière Award for Best Newcomer
1987	Dom Juan	Molière	Jean-Luc Moreau	
1988	Britannicus	Jean Racine	Marcelle Tassencourt	
1990	The Cherry Orchard	Anton Tchekhov	Jacques Rosny (2)	
1991	Enfin seuls !	Lawrence Roman	Michel Fagadau	
1993	The Seagull	Anton Tchekhov	Michel Fagadau (2)	
1993	La Peau des autres	Jordan Plevnes	Jacques Seiler	
1994	Falstafe	Valère Novarina	Marcel Maréchal	
1995	An Inspector Calls	J. B. Priestley	Annick Blancheteau	
1996	The Misanthrope	Molière	Michel Boy	
1996	A Landscape Painter	Henry James	Simone Benmussa	
1998	Invitation to the Castle	Jean Anouilh	Jean-Claude Brialy	
1998	Château en Suède	Françoise Sagan	Annick Blancheteau (2)	Molière Award for Best Newcomer
1998–99	London Assurance	Dion Boucicault	Adrian Brine	
2001	Rameau's Nephew	Denis Diderot	Jean-Pierre Rumeau	
2002	The Liar	Pierre Corneille	Nicolas Briançon	
2003	Rameau's Nephew	Denis Diderot	Jean-Pierre Rumeau (2)	
2004	L'Autre	Florian Zeller	Annick Blancheteau (3)	
2005	Rameau's Nephew	Denis Diderot	Jean-Pierre Rumeau (3)	Théâtre Le Ranelagh
2005	Le Manège	Florian Zeller	Nicolas Briançon (2)	
2006	Pygmalion	George Bernard Shaw	Nicolas Briançon (3)	Le Théâtre Libre, Paris
2007	Fantasio	Alfred de Musset	Stéphanie Tesson	
2008	Elle t'attend	Florian Zeller	Florian Zeller	Nominated - Molière Award for Best Supporting Actor
2009	The Birthday Party	Harold Pinter	Michel Fagadau (3)	
2009–10	Rameau's Nephew	Denis Diderot	Jean-Pierre Rumeau (4)	
2011–12	L'Intrus	Antoine Rault	Christophe Lidon	
2012	Address Unknown	Kathrine Taylor	Delphine de Malherbe	
2013	L'île de Venus	Gilles Costaz	Thierry Harcourt	
2013–15	Rameau's Nephew	Denis Diderot	Jean-Pierre Rumeau (5)	Théâtre Le Ranelagh
2016	L’impresario de Smyrne	Carlo Goldoni	Christophe Lidon (2)	Théâtre Alexandre-Dumas
