= A Good Doctor =

- Directed by: Tristan Séguéla
- Screenplay by: Tristan Séguéla; Jim Birmant
- Produced by: Bruno Nahon
- Starring: Michel Blanc; Hakim Jemili; Solène Rigot
- Cinematography: Frédéric Noirhomme
- Edited by: Grégoire Sivan
- Release date: 2019
- Language: French

A Good Doctor (French: Docteur ?) is a 2019 French comedy film directed by Tristan Séguéla and starring Michel Blanc and Hakim Jemili.

== Cast ==
- Michel Blanc as Serge Mamou Mani
- Hakim Jemili as Malek
- Solène Rigot as Rose
- Artus as Wilfried
- Franck Gastambide as Grisoni
- Fadily Camara as Sonya Derringer
- Lucia Sanchez as Madame Dos Santos
- Jacques Boudet as Mr. Xanakis
- Ophélia Kolb as Marjolaine Joffrin
- Maxence Tual as Henri Joffrin
- Nicolas Vaude as Charles Schneider
- Natalie Beder as Constance Schneider
- Marie-Christine Adam as Madame Schneider
- Chantal Lauby as Suzy

== Production ==
The film was produced by Unité de Production, with France 2 Cinéma serving as co-producer. It was shot in Paris, with principal photography starting in January 2019.

== Reception ==
The film won the Grand Prix at the Liège International Comedy Film Festival, and the Prix des Lycéens at the 28th Sarlat Film Festival.

Stuff described the film as "an enjoyable, well-assembled and genuinely emotional French romp". RNZ also praised it, calling it "laugh out loud funny all the way" and "tight and mathematically contrived as most American examples are approximate, and dependent on inspired ad-libs".

Le Quotidien described it as "pure, joyful entertainment that makes you laugh and gives you a little food for thought". L'Express called it "a pure buddy movie" characterized by "fast-paced rhythm" and "a highly entertaining whirlwind of comedy".

== Remake ==
In 2021, the film had an Italian remake, Una notte da dottore, directed by Guido Chiesa and starring Diego Abatantuono and Frank Matano.
