= Mon père avait raison =

French TV movie (1996)

Mon père avait raison is a 1996 French TV movie directed by Roger Vadim starring Marie-Christine Barrault, Claude Rich and Nicolas Vaude. It was based on a play by Sacha Guitry.
