= The Good Lawyer =

2026 thriller drama film

- Promotional release poster
- French: Un bon avocat
- Directed by: Tristan Séguéla
- Written by: Simon Jacquet; Marcia Romano; Tristan Séguéla
- Produced by: Simon Jacquet
- Starring: Laurent Lafitte; Mélanie Laurent; Carole Bouquet
- Cinematography: Augustin Barbaroux
- Edited by: Pierre Deschamps
- Music by: Amine Bouhafa
- Production company: Iconoclast
- Distributed by: Netflix
- Release dates: 11 September 2026 (Venice); 9 November 2026 (Netflix)
- Running time: 87 minutes
- Country: France
- Language: French

The Good Lawyer (French: Un bon avocat) is a 2026 French thriller drama film directed by Tristan Séguéla, co-written with Marcia Romano, Simon Jacquet, and Stéphane Sebag. It stars Laurent Lafitte, Mélanie Laurent and Carole Bouquet.

The film had its world premiere out of competition of the 83rd Venice International Film Festival on 11 September 2026. It was released worldwide by Netflix on 9 November 2026.

== Cast ==
- Laurent Lafitte as Léonard Landry
- Mélanie Laurent as Iris Saint Didier
- Carole Bouquet as Anne Lamarck
- Anthony Bajon as Noé
- Gédéon Ekay as Caleb / Firmin
- Béatrice Facquer as Madame Lemonnier
- Aristote Luyindula as Suleiman
- Soraya Garlenq as Mallory

== Production ==
The film had the working title Clean. Séguéla and the scriptwriters reportedly spent a week shadowing a real criminal defence lawyer, observing his day-to-day work. While the main character is not directly based on a real-life lawyer, many of the legal situations in the film are derived from documented incidents that actually took place in court. Principal cinematography started on 11 February 2026.

== Release ==
The film had its world premiere out competition at the 83rd Venice International Film Festival on 11 September 2026. It was released worldwide by Netflix on 9 November 2026.

== Reception ==
Cineuropa's Jan Lumholdt compared the film's style to Bad Lieutenant and Pusher, and called it "well-crafted" and "decently multifaceted". Max Borg from The Film Verdict called the film "slick" and especially praised Laurent Lafitte's performance, noting how, if the film would had been screened in the Venice Festival's main competition, Lafitte would had been a potential threat to John Malkovich's chances of winning the Volpi Cup. Barbara Shulgasser from Common Sense Media wrote "An able cast helps the movie gallop along, leaving little time for us to dwell on fuzzy plot points or the fact that it can be difficult to root for a man this ethically untethered". Devika Girish from The New York Times also praised the film, noting "Tristan Séguéla ramps up the ethical stakes as the film proceeds, delivering a profound critique of the legal system with an unforgettable adrenaline rush".
