= Dear Mother (film) =

2020 French comedy film

- Poster
- French: L'Origine du monde
- Directed by: Laurent Lafitte
- Screenplay by: Laurent Lafitte
- Based on: L'Origine du monde by Sébastien Thiéry
- Produced by: Alain Attal
- Starring: Laurent Lafitte; Karin Viard; Vincent Macaigne; Hélène Vincent; Nicole Garcia
- Cinematography: Axel Cosnefroy
- Edited by: Stephan Couturier
- Music by: Gabriel Fauré
- Production company: Trésor Films
- Distributed by: StudioCanal; Netflix
- Release dates: October 2020 (Namur); 15 September 2021 (France, Belgium)
- Running time: 98 minutes
- Country: France
- Language: French
- Box office: $1.8 million

Dear Mother (French: L'Origine du monde; lit. 'The Origin of the World') is a 2020 French film written and directed by Laurent Lafitte. Lafitte also stars in the film, alongside Karin Viard and Vincent Macaigne. The movie was adapted from a play of the same name by Sébastien Thiéry. It was an official selection at the 2020 Cannes Film Festival.

== Synopsis ==
While at the gym, 40-year-old lawyer Jean-Louis Bordier realizes that his heart has stopped beating. He no longer feels a pulse but remains conscious, managing to do his regular activities without any noticeable difference. His best friend, veterinarian Michel, tries to help, without knowing what to do. Jean-Louis' wife, Valérie, consults her spiritual life coach for advice. The latter comes up with a creative but rather unconventional solution that involves Jean-Louis' mother.

== Production ==
Laurent Lafitte, who had discovered the play L'Origine du monde by Sébastien Thiéry in 2013, announced the project in 2019 as his directorial debut. Lafitte initially planned to portray Michel's character, as he found him to be the funniest. Filming began on 3 June 2019, taking place in Paris and Île-de-France, and lasted eight weeks.

== Release ==
In June 2019, it was announced that Dear Mother would be released in France on 11 November 2020. The film was scheduled to premiere at the 2020 Cannes Film Festival, which was canceled due to the COVID-19 pandemic. The French national release was set for 4 November 2020 but due to the closure of cinemas during the pandemic, it was postponed until 2021. Netflix released the film in North America in 2022.

== Cast and characters ==
- Laurent Lafitte as Jean-Louis Bordier
- Karin Viard as Valérie Bordier
- Vincent Macaigne as Michel Verdoux
- Hélène Vincent as Brigitte Bordier
- Nicole Garcia as Margaux
- Pauline Clément as photocopy shop employee
- Luca Malinowski as trans woman
- Juliette Bettencourt as 16-year-old Valentine
- Charlotte Bienenfeld as Marie de la Rochène
- Christine Beauvallet as Valentine's mother
- Benoît DuPac as Valentine's father
- Cédric Leffray as 16-year-old Jean-Louis
- Pascal Lifschutz as Jean-Louis's father
- Jean-Claude Bohbote as Mr. Gillet
- Grégory Gaule as firefighter
