= Monsieur Klein =

1976 film directed by Joseph Losey

- U.S. theatrical release poster
- Directed by: Joseph Losey
- Written by: Franco Solinas; Fernando Morandi; Costa-Gavras (uncredited)
- Produced by: Alain Delon
- Starring: Alain Delon; Jeanne Moreau; Michael Lonsdale; Francine Bergé; Juliet Berto; Massimo Girotti; Suzanne Flon
- Cinematography: Gerry Fisher
- Edited by: Marie Castro-Vasquez; Henri Lanoë; Michèle Neny
- Music by: Egisto Macchi; Pierre Porte
- Production company: Lira Films; Adel Productions; Nova Films; Mondial Televisione Film
- Distributed by: Fox-Lira (France); Titanus (Italy)
- Release dates: 22 May 1976 (Cannes); 23 September 1976 (Italy); 27 October 1976 (France)
- Running time: 123 minutes
- Countries: France; Italy
- Language: French
- Budget: $3,500,000
- Box office: $193,028

Monsieur Klein (English: "Mr. Klein") is a 1976 mystery drama film directed by Joseph Losey, produced by and starring Alain Delon in the title role. Set in occupied France, the Kafkaesque narrative follows an apparently Gentile Parisian art dealer who is seemingly mistaken for a Jewish man of the same name and targeted in the Holocaust, unable to prove his identity.

The film is a French and Italian co-production, and premiered at the 1976 Cannes Film Festival. It received widespread acclaim from critics and won three César Awards; Best Film, Best Director (Joseph Losey), and Best Production Design (Alexandre Trauner). Alain Delon was nominated for Best Actor.

== Plot ==
Paris, January 1942. France is occupied by the Germans. Robert Klein, apparently apolitical and amoral, is a well-to-do art dealer, Roman Catholic and Alsatian by birth, who takes advantage of French Jews who need to sell artworks to raise cash to leave the country.

One day, the local Jewish newspaper, addressed to him, is delivered to his home. He learns that another Robert Klein who has been living in Paris, a Jew sought by police, has had his own mail forwarded to him in an apparent attempt to destroy his social reputation and make him a target of official anti-Semitism. He reports this to the police, who remain suspicious he may be reporting this scheme to disguise his own true identity.

His own investigations lead him in contradictory directions, to Klein who lives in a slum while having an affair with his concierge and to Klein who visits a palatial country estate where he has seduced an apparently Jewish married woman.

When the art dealer cannot locate the other Klein, authorities require him to offer proof of his French non-Jewish ancestry. While waiting for the documentation to arrive, he struggles to track down his namesake and learn his motivation, even breaking off an opportunity to flee the country in order to investigate further. Before he can resolve the situation by either means, he is caught up in the July 1942 roundup of Parisian Jews. As he is hustled into a dark tunnel, his lawyer arrives with complete proof of his non-Jewish ancestry. Klein blankly ignores the lawyer's pleas and continues into the tunnel.

The film offers no clear resolution of its contradictory evidence and dead ends. It ends as he is reunited with Jews who once were his clients as they board boxcars for Auschwitz.

== Cast ==
- Alain Delon as Robert Klein
- Jeanne Moreau as Florence
- Michael Lonsdale as Pierre
- Francine Bergé as Nicole
- Juliet Berto as Jeanine
- Massimo Girotti as Charles
- Magali Clément as Lola
- Louis Seigner as Robert's father
- Francine Racette as Isabelle / Françoise / Cathy
- Jean Bouise as The seller
- Suzanne Flon as The concierge
- Michel Aumont as The civil servant
- Roland Bertin as The editor
- Jean Champion as The coroner
- Étienne Chicot as 1st policeman
- Pierre Vernier as 2nd policeman
- Gérard Jugnot as The photographer
- Isabelle Sadoyan as The consultation woman
- Hermine Karagheuz as The working girl

== Symbolism and allusions ==
Although Losey integrates historical elements (such as the infamous Vel' d'Hiv Roundup) into the film, it is more than a reconstruction of the life and status of the Jews under the Vichy regime.

The relationship of the film with the works of the writer Franz Kafka has often been noted, for example: The Metamorphosis, telling of the brutal and sudden transformation of a man into an insect; The Castle, which describes a search for one's own identity by way of getting to know "the other"; The Trial, which sees an accused man become an outlaw of society.

According to Vincent Canby, the filmmakers "are not as interested in the workings of the plot as in matters of identity and obsession".

== Reception ==
The film has an approval rating of 100% on Rotten Tomatoes based on 16 reviews.

Vincent Canby of The New York Times who saw the film at the 68th Street Playhouse in 1977, had criticized the role of Alain Delon as Mr. Klein, saying that [he] is neither interesting nor mysterious enough to hold a film together.

=== Awards and nominations ===
The film was nominated for the Palme d'Or at the 1976 Cannes Film Festival but lost to Taxi Driver. However, Monsieur Klein did win the César Award for Best Film while Losey won the César Award for Best Director. Alexandre Trauner won the César Award for Best Production Design, Alain Delon was nominated for the César Award for Best Actor, and in addition the film was nominated for Césars in three other categories.

Award	Category	Nominee	Result
Cannes Film Festival	Palme d'Or	Joseph Losey	Nominated
César Award	Best Film	Joseph Losey	Won
César Award	Best Director	Joseph Losey	Won
César Award	Best Actor	Alain Delon	Nominated
César Award	Best Cinematography	Gerry Fisher	Nominated
César Award	Best Editing	Henri Lanoë	Nominated
César Award	Best Production Design	Alexandre Trauner	Won
César Award	Best Editing	Jean Labussière	Nominated

== Restoration ==
A restored version was released by Rialto Pictures in 2019.
