= Oh God, Women Are So Loving =

- Directed by: Magali Clément
- Written by: Magali Clément
- Starring: Catherine Jacob
- Cinematography: Pierre Lhomme
- Edited by: Amina Mazani
- Music by: Jean-Jacques Lemêtre
- Production company: MDG Productions
- Distributed by: AMLF
- Release date: 1 June 1994
- Running time: 90 minutes
- Country: France
- Language: French

Oh God, Women Are So Loving or Dieu, que les femmes sont amoureuses... is a 1994 French comedy film, directed and written by Magali Clément.

== Plot ==
Anne is a divorced woman and mother of three children, overwhelmed by her family and professional life (she works for television). Between Daniel, her ex-husband and Regis, her frequently absent lover, Arthur reappears in her life, a man she had not seen for eight years.

== Cast ==
- Catherine Jacob as Anne
- Mathieu Carrière as Daniel
- Étienne Chicot as Arthur
- Jean-Pierre Malo as Regis
- Yves Beneyton as Jacques
- Fiona Gélin as Marylou
- Pascale Audret as Mama
- Grace De Capitani as Cathy
- Judith Rémy as Mercedes
- Cathy Bodet as Eva
- David Carré as Simon
- Léa Jarleton as Lolotte
- Justine Jarleton as Lily
- Henri-Edouard Osinski as Pierre-Louis
- John Fernie as Hervé
- Alain Bert as Bob
- Pasquale D'Inca as Nathan
- Mélanie Laforie as Cléa

== Production ==
This is the last movie directed by Magali Clément. She die, 5 month after the movie was released.
