= Armel Hostiou =

French filmmaker (born 1976)

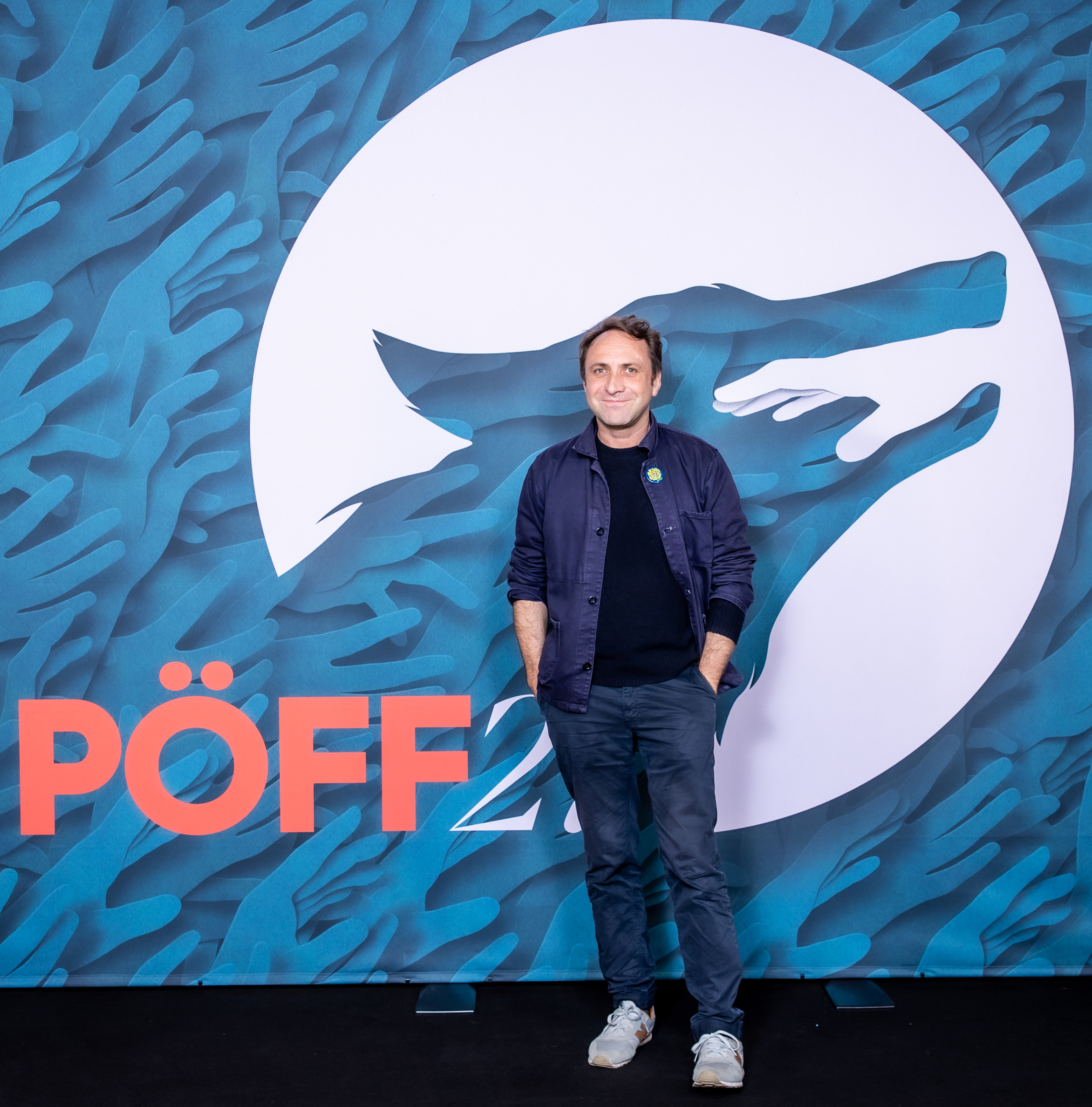
- Armel Hostiou at the Tallinn Black Nights Film Festival 2023
- Born: 9 November 1976 (age 49); Rennes, France
- Occupations: film director, screenwriter
- Years active: 2003 - present
- Website: www.armelhostiou.com/

Armel Hostiou is a French filmmaker.

== Career ==
Hostiou studied at La Fémis cinema school in Paris, he graduated in 2003. Then he directed several short films, SoloS, Contre Temps, Lost You, Chorus, Kino, World was on Fire and No One Could Save Me But You, Psycho Motion, La ville bleue.

Those films won different awards in film festivals Best experimental Film Tel Aviv 2004 for SoloS, Audience Award Munich 2006 for Contre Temps, Jury Award San Francisco Independent Exposure 2008 for Kino, Audience Award San Francisco Metacafe Festival 2009 for World was on Fire and no one could save me but You. Hostiou also directed music videos for French and American bands (Babx, Fantazio, Poni Hoax, Limousine, DM Stith, Foma) and some experimental films and video installations.

Day, his first feature film, produced by Bocalupo Films was premiered at the Cannes film festival in 2011 in the Acid selection. The U.S. premiere took place at the European Film festival in the Miami Beach Cinematheque as the opening film of the festival.

In 2013 he shot in New York his second feature film, also produced by Bocalupo Films, Stubborn (Une histoire américaine, French title), starring Vincent Macaigne and Kate Moran. The film is released in France in February 2015 by UFO Distribution. The U.S. premiere took place in New York at Lincoln Center as part of the 20th "Rendez-Vous with French cinema" film festival in March 2015.

In 2019, The Invisible Pyramid, his first feature-length documentary, filmed in Bosnia and Herzegovina, had its premiere at the Cinéma du Réel Festival in Paris. In 2023, he's presenting a new film, The Other Profile, which recounts his quest to track down an identity thief in Congo. The U.S. Premiere took place at the True/False Film Festival in March 2024. Selected by numerous festivals worldwide, it won the Audience Award at the Sicilia Queer Filmfest in Palermo in 2024.

== Filmography ==
=== Feature films ===
- 2012: Day
- 2015: Stubborn
- 2019: The Invisible Pyramid
- 2023: The Other Profile

=== Short films ===
- 2003: SoloS
- 2004: Kino
- 2004: Chorus
- 2005: Contre Temps
- 2006: World was on fire and no one could save me but you
- 2008: Lost You
- 2012: Psycho Motion
- 2013: Kingston Avenue
- 2015: La ville bleue
- 2024: Estela

=== Music videos ===
- 2005: De Saragosse à Barcelone - Julien Ribot - Ici, d'ailleurs...
- 2006: Seven Days - Fantazio - La Triperie
- 2006: Crack Maniac - Babx - Warner Music
- 2007: Cœur Larsen - Babx - Warner Music
- 2007: Bains de minuit - Babx - Warner Music
- 2008: Vanita - Toma Fetermix - Musikaction
- 2009: Sirènes - Delphine Volange - Labelenchanteur
- 2009: Do look back- Suicide - Kochka Da Cat
- 2009: Terra Incognita - Foma - Inverness
- 2009: BMB - DM Stith - Asthmatic Kitty Records
- 2009: Bons baisers d'Islamabad - Babx - Warner Music
- 2009: Electrochocs Ladyland - Babx - Warner Music
- 2009: De Haut en Bas - Arlt - Almost Musique
- 2009: The brightest side - Fantazio - La Triperie
- 2010: Hypernuit - Bertrand Belin - Label Cinq 7
- 2010: Even If - Limousine - Ekler’o’shock Records
- 2010: La mort des amants - Babx - Warner Music
- 2010: Carrie Ann - Poni Hoax & Babx - Tigersushi
- 2011: Tes bonnes choses - Louis Bertignac - Polydor
- 2012: Despote Paranoïa - Babx - Label Cinq 7
- 2013: Tchador Woman - Babx - Label Cinq 7
- 2013: Naomi Aime - Babx - Label Cinq 7
- 2013: There's nothing left for you here - Poni Hoax - Paneuropean Recordings
- 2013: Je ne t'ai jamais aimé - Babx - Label Cinq 7
- 2013: Lucile - Ghost Dance - Label La Fugitive
- 2014: Helsinki - Babx - Label Cinq 7
- 2015: Lost - Arcan
- 2016: Honneur - Armelle Dumoulin - Label Le Furieux
- 2017: Unknown dancer - DR(DR)ONE feat. Thomas de Pourquery
- 2018: You shall live - Ghost Dance - Label La Fugitive
- 2018: Trilogie Omaya - Babx - Label Bison Bison
- 2019: Omble Chevalier - Jean-baptiste Soulard & J. P. Nataf - Label Musique Sauvage
- 2019: Khellitini Najri Maurak - Mohamed Lamouri - Label Horizon / Sony

=== Experimental ===
- 2005: Everything is mental - Moscow Digital Act 2011
- 2006: Chute, 1 & 2 - Exposition Permanence, Orangerie de Sucy 2006
- 2006: Ondes (rêver immobile) - Théâtre de Bonneuil 2007
- 2007: Les petites statues - Kunsthaus Luxembourg Capitale européenne de la culture 2007
- 2007: Anatomie d'une ville Translocated, Londres 2010
- 2007: Wall Times, 1 & 2 - Melilla (2007) - Ramallah (2009)
- 2008: Sensations - Rimbaudmania, Bibliothèque historique de la ville de Paris 2010
- 2008: Laps - Espace Landowski, Boulogne 2009
- 2008: Traces - Dans la nuit, des images- Grand Palais, Paris 2008
- 2010: Niobe - Le quai de la batterie, Arras 2010
- 2011: Chili - Art of Travelling #1
- 2012: Flota - Curtis R. Priem Experimental Media and Performing Arts Center EMPAC
- 2012: Watch Thru Me - Curtis R. Priem Experimental Media and Performing Arts Center EMPAC
- 2013: Stellar (Region) - Innermap
- 2014: Duende - Musée Picasso - Nuit Blanche Paris 2014

== Awards ==
- 2004: Best experimental Film, SoloS, Tel Aviv international student film festival
- 2004: Prix BAC cinéma, SoloS, Rencontres cinématographiques de Digne
- 2004: Prix SACEM, SoloS, Festival des e-magiciens, Valenciennes
- 2005: Max Ophuls preis, Chorus, Saarbrücken Film festival
- 2006: Audience Award, Contre Temps, FFAT Festival Munich
- 2007: Prix du clip le plus créatif de l'année, Seven Days, Le Monde.fr
- 2008: Geografias de la imagen, Anatomie d'une ville Fundacion Ars Teore-tica
- 2008: Selected music video 2008, BMB (can't say goodbye), YouTube US
- 2008: Jury Award, Kino, San Francisco Independent Exposure
- 2009: Audience Award, Metafest, World was on fire and no one could save me but you, San Francisco
- 2012: Curator's choice, Rives, Young French Cinema at B.A.M. - New York
- 2015: Young Programmers Award, Une histoire américaine, Festival de cine europeo de Sevilla
- 2024 : Audience Award, Le Vrai du Faux, Sicila Queer International New Visions Film Fest
