= Elles et Moi =

- Directed by: Bernard Stora
- Screenplay by: Bernard Stora; Larry Bernard
- Release date: 2008
- Running time: 119 minutes (part 1); 103 minutes (part 2)
- Countries: France; Spain

Elles et Moi (English: Them and Me) is a 2008 French-Spanish film directed by Bernard Stora and divided into two parts.

== Synopsis ==
January 1939. The fall of Barcelona declares the defeat of the Spanish Republicans, and 500,000 choose exile. Arriving in France, the men are disarmed and interned in camps, and their families are moved by the government to makeshift camps, many in Ardèche. Elles et Moi follows the fate of the Esteva family during those terrible months and the five years of war that will follow.

While Lluis refuses to accept defeat and dreams of a future victory, Pilar seeks above all to survive and raise her children, Isabel and Ignacio. She knows that this new country will be theirs for a long time and despite the difficulties, she tries to integrate. Sixty years later, Isabel Esteva, having become a world-famous fashion designer, remembers her troubled life.

== Cast ==
- Ariadna Gil: Pilar Esteva
- Àstrid Bergès-Frisbey: Isabel Esteva
- Danielle Darrieux: Isabel Esteva, at 80
- Montserrat Carulla: Esperanza, the mother of Pilar
- Julie Depardieu: Alice Brunetti
- Jean-Pierre Marielle: Emile de Montellier
- Nicolas Vaude: Henri de Montellier
- Martine Chevallier: Blanche de Montellier
- Isabelle Sadoyan: Madame Bonel
- Guillaume Gallienne: Robert
- Bernard Blancan: Rafael
- Luis Rego: Jo Morales
- Serge Riaboukine: Warrant Rouquette
- Anouchka Vézian: Woman of the station in Le Pouzin
