= Fool Circle =

- Film poster
- Directed by: Vincent Mariette
- Written by: Vincent Mariette; Vincent Poymiro
- Produced by: Amaury Ovise; Jean-Christophe Reymond
- Starring: Ludivine Sagnier; Laurent Lafitte; Vincent Macaigne; Noémie Lvovsky
- Cinematography: Julien Roux
- Edited by: Nicolas Desmaison
- Music by: Robin Coudert
- Production companies: Kazak Productions; 2L Productions; Rhône-Alpes Cinéma
- Distributed by: Haut et Court
- Release date: 4 June 2014
- Running time: 90 minutes
- Country: France
- Language: French
- Budget: $2.1 million
- Box office: $505.000

Fool Circle (French: Tristesse Club) is a 2014 French comedy-drama film directed by Vincent Mariette and starring Ludivine Sagnier, Laurent Lafitte and Vincent Macaigne.

== Cast ==
- Ludivine Sagnier as Chloé
- Laurent Lafitte as Léon Camus
- Vincent Macaigne as Bruno Camus
- Noémie Lvovsky as Rebecca
- Philippe Rebbot as Yvan
- Dominique Reymond as Claude
- Anne Azoulay as Florence
- Délia Espinat-Dief as Lola
- Emile Baujard as Jérôme Camus
- Théo Cholbi as Guillaume
