= Class Act (French TV series) =

French television drama miniseries

- Genre: Drama
- Written by: Olivier Demangel; Thomas Finkielkraut; Tristan Séguéla
- Directed by: Tristan Séguéla
- Starring: Laurent Lafitte
- Music by: Amin Bouhafa
- Country of origin: France
- Original language: French
- No. of episodes: 7

Production
- Producer: Bruno Nahon
- Cinematography: Romain Carcanade; Hichame Alaouié
- Editors: Jean-Baptiste Beaudoin; Alice Plantin; Grégoire Sivan; Alexis Marro; Justine Roussillon

Original release
- Network: Netflix
- Release: 23 September 2023

Class Act (Tapie) is a French drama miniseries, that debuted on Netflix on 13 September 2023, after being presented at Canneseries in April 2023. The miniserie won the 2024 British Academy Television Award for Best International Programme.

== Plot ==
In the mid-1960s, Bernard Tapie went into business. This ambitious man will develop numerous projects and businesses, launch into singing as well as sport and politics. Although he experienced many successes, he also suffered serious failures.

== Cast ==
- Laurent Lafitte as Bernard Tapie
- Joséphine Japy as Dominique Tapie, née Mialet-Damianos
- Patrick d'Assumçao as Jean-Baptiste Tapie
- Antoine Reinartz as Fabien Bogaert
- Catherine Chevallier as Raymonde Tapie
- Camille Chamoux as Nicole Le Carré
- Hakim Jemili as Farid Bentarek
- Grégoire Oestermann as Charles Coupant
- Philippe Uchan as Jean-Pierre Bernès
- Sébastien Chassagne as Julien
- Ophélia Kolb as Michèle Tapie
- Samuel Labarthe as François Mitterrand
- Anne Benoît as Sandrine Leduc
- Fabrice Luchini as Marcel Loiseau
- Pascal Elso as Robert Vigouroux
- Nicolas Vaude as Coutanceau
