= Magali Clément =

French actress

- Born: France
- Died: November 15, 2008; Bayeux, Normandy, France
- Occupations: Director, screenwriter, actress
- Years active: 1969–1994

Magali Clément was a French director, screenwriter and actress.

== Theatre ==
Year	Title	Author	Director	Notes
1976	Les Estivants	Maxime Gorki	Michel Dubois	Comédie de Caen
1978	Les Assiégés	Francis Stone	Jean-Gabriel Nordmann	Théâtre Mouffetard

== Filmography ==
Year	Title	Role	Box office	Notes
1969	The Great Love	Actress		Directed by Pierre Étaix
1971	Crime et châtiment	Actress		TV movie directed by Stellio Lorenzi
1971	Bouvard et Pécuchet	Actress		TV movie directed by Robert Valey
1972	La cerisaie	Actress		TV movie directed by Stellio Lorenzi
1973	L'inconnu	Actress		TV movie directed by Youri
1975	Washington Square	Actress		TV movie directed by Alain Boudet
1976	Monsieur Klein	Actress	$5,338,140	Directed by Joseph Losey
1976	La poupée sanglante	Actress		TV mini-series directed by Marcel Cravenne
1977	Dernière sortie avant Roissy	Actress		Directed by Bernard Paul
1978	Dirty Dreamer	Actress	$3,887,977	Directed by Jean-Marie Périer
1978	Vas-y maman	Actress	$9,081,120	Directed by Nicole de Buron
1978	Le temps d'une République	Actress		TV series (1 episode) directed by Alain Boudet
1978	Médecins de nuit	Actress		TV series (1 episode) directed by Philippe Lefebvre
1979	Les fleurs fanées	Actress		TV movie directed by Jacques Fansten
1979	Caméra une première	Actress		TV series (1 episode) directed by Michel Léviant
1980	Cinéma 16	Actress		TV series (1 episode) directed by Bruno Gantillon
1981	La gueule du loup	Actress		Directed by Michel Léviant
1981	Sans famille	Actress		TV series (1 episode) directed by Jacques Ertaud
1983	Itinéraire bis	Actress		Directed by Christian Drillaud
1983	Coup de feu	Director, writer & Actress		Short; French Syndicate of Cinema Critics - Best Short; Nominated - César Award for Best Short Film
1984	Le clou	Actress		Short directed by Philippe Le Guay
1987	Les Cinq Dernières Minutes	Actress		TV series (1 episode) directed by Franck Apprederis
1987	L'amour est blette	Director & writer		Short
1987	L'heure Simenon	Writer		TV series (1 episode) directed by Claude Goretta
1988	La maison de Jeanne	Director & writer		
1988	Jaune revolver	Actress	$173,475	Directed by Olivier Langlois
1989	Maria Vandamme	Actress		TV mini-series directed by Jacques Ertaud
1990	Fleur bleue	Director		TV mini-series
1991	Comme nous serons heureux	Director, writer & Cinematographer		Short
1991	Des cornichons au chocolat	Director		TV movie
1994	Oh God, Women Are So Loving	Director & writer		
