= The Judge (1984 film) =

- Directed by: Philippe Lefebvre
- Written by: Bernard Stora; Philippe Lefebvre
- Produced by: Philippe Schwartz
- Starring: Jacques Perrin; Richard Bohringer
- Cinematography: Jean-Paul Schwartz
- Edited by: Youcef Tobni
- Music by: Luis Bacalov
- Release date: 11 April 1984
- Running time: 94 minutes
- Country: France
- Language: French

The Judge (French: Le Juge) is a 1984 French crime drama film directed by Philippe Lefebvre. The film was shown at the 1984 Mystfest where it was nominated in the category of Best Picture.

== Cast ==
- Jacques Perrin as Le juge François Muller
- Richard Bohringer as Le commissaire Lucien Innocenti
- Daniel Duval as Antoine Rocca
- Andréa Ferréol as Regine Sauvat
- Jean Benguigui as Maître Donati
- Michael Lonsdale as Le Docteur
- Giacomo Piperno as Le juge Galéazzi
- Jean-Pierre Sentier as Le commissaire Perrota
- Paul Le Person as Le président Lebau
- Brigitte Catillon as Gregoire
- Jean Franval as Pinacchio
- Patrick Chauvel as Calvo
- Pascal Pistaccio as Abecassis
- Anne Canovas as Monique Muller
- Maurice Jacquemont as Maître Camoin
- Georges Trillat as Tarzan
- Papinou as Le flic
- Jean Maurel as Louis Agopian
- Alain Rimoux as Le médecin de la prison
- Alain Halle-Halle as Le juge Richard
- Michele Trikeira as La fille de la discothèque
- Tharita De Oliveira as La femme de Rocca
- Daniel-Claude Poyet as Equipe de Innocenti
- Alexandre Fabre as Equipe de Innocenti
- François Mouren-Provensal as Equipe de Innocenti
- Odile Sage as Equipe de Innocenti
- Simon Michael as Le tueur du bar Lucien
