= Zorro (French TV series) =

French television series

- Teaser poster
- Genre: Action; Adventure
- Created by: Benjamin Charbit
- Based on: Zorro by Johnston McCulley
- Directed by: Émilie Noblet; Jean-Baptiste Saurel
- Starring: Jean Dujardin; Audrey Dana; Salvatore Ficarra; André Dussollier; Grégory Gadebois; Éric Elmosnino
- Composer: Julie Roué
- Country of origin: France
- Original language: French
- No. of seasons: 1
- No. of episodes: 8

Production
- Executive producer: Carlos Ruiz Boceta
- Running time: 40 minutes
- Production companies: Collectif 64; Bien sûr Productions; Montebello Productions; Panache Productions; la Compagnie Cinématographique; André Logie & Gaétan David; RTL Belgium; RTL TVI

Original release
- Network: Paramount+
- Release: September 6, 2024

Zorro is a French television series (with co-producers in the USA and Belgium) starring Jean Dujardin as a middle-aged Don Diego de la Vega/Zorro. It consists of eight episodes, which were released on September 6, 2024 on Paramount+ and broadcast in Belgium starting on 4 December 2024 on RTL TVI and in France starting on 23 December 2024 on France 2. It was directed by Émilie Noblet and Jean-Baptiste Saurel based on a script by Benjamin Charbit and Noé Debré.

This is the first time since the film Zorro (1975) starring Alain Delon that a French actor has portrayed the character of Zorro in live-action.

The filming took place in southern Spain and the post-production was done in Belgium.

To accompany the release of this miniseries, France Télévisions offered an interactive system available on the France.tv platform.

== Plot ==
In 1821, twenty years after retiring from being Zorro, Don Diego de la Vega is an important figure in Los Angeles, California.

Married with Doña Gabriella, he succeeds his father Don Alejandro as the town mayor. He quickly realizes that some injustices in the town can only be fought by bringing back Zorro, so with the help of his trusted mute manservant Bernardo he once again dons the cape and the mask. His double identity creates various difficulties, especially as his wife doesn't know about his secret.

== Cast ==
=== The de la Vega Family ===
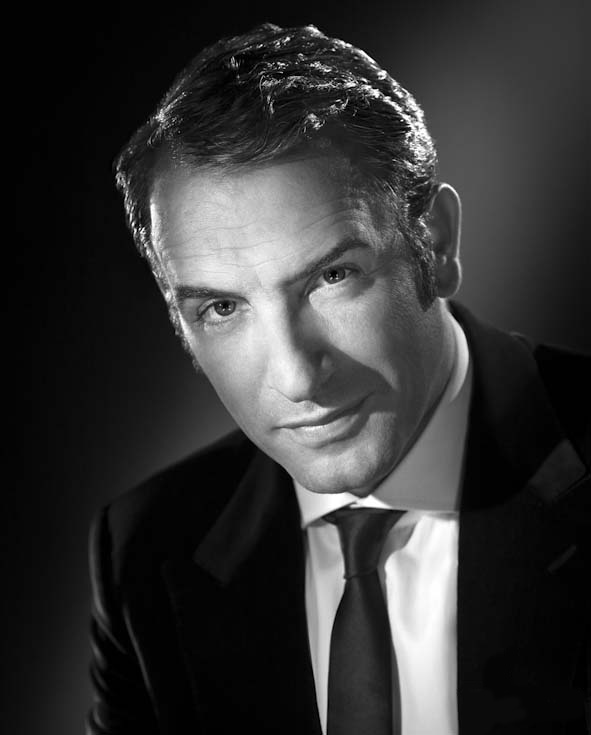
Jean Dujardin

- Jean Dujardin as Don Diego de la Vega/Zorro
- Audrey Dana as Doña Gabriella, Don Diego's wife
- André Dussollier as Don Alejandro, Don Diego's father
- Salvatore Ficarra as Bernardo, Don Diego's mute servant

=== Nakaï and his family ===
- Baltasar Espinach as Nakaï, Don Diego and Doña Gabriella's adopted son
- David Ayala as Nakaï's father
- Lucia Sanchez as Nakaï's mother
- Lily Noell as Nakaï's sister

=== Los Angeles Garrison Soldiers ===
- Grégory Gadebois as Sergeant Cristóbal Garcia
- Jean-Benoît Ugeux as The big mustached man
- Julien Gaspar-Oliveri as The small tough guy
- Marc Velasco as The big dope

=== Other characters ===
- Éric Elmosnino as Don Emmanuel
- Éric Massot as Don Javier
- Éric Challier as The Viceroy of Spain
- Axelle Simon as Giorgina
- Virginie Emane as Maria
- Xavier Roqueta as Sergio

== Production ==
=== Genesis and development ===
Since the character of Zorro entered the public domain in 2013, announcements of new films have been flourishing. On October 14, 2022, France Télévisions announced the production of a Zorro series, with Oscar-winning actor Jean Dujardin playing the role of the masked hero.

The director of cinema at France Télévisions, Manuel Alduy, stated: "We are delighted to be involved in the development of this beautiful family adventure series." He accompanied his message with a photo of Jean Dujardin wearing the costume and mustache of Don Diego de la Vega, with the shadow of the masked vigilante and the famous "Z" which he signs with the tip of his sword in the background.

The series is written by Benjamin Charbit and Noé Debré. Benjamin Charbit said: "I learned a lot writing Zorro. I was able to validate for myself a number of theories. For example, that comedy doesn’t exclude beauty and the mixing of genres, even though the chemistry is not always easy to find. In Zorro, we sought to link comedy with melodrama, drama with romance."

Marc Dujardin, Jean’s brother and president of the production company Le Collectif 64, promised a Zorro who is "a bit older and married," and who will not exactly be faithful to the original Don Diego de la Vega: "It will be very European, very swashbuckling. [...] Our hero will be more human, more tormented, and confronted with various issues, including the question of relationships, which will be important."

In November 2023, Allociné and Ouest-France announced that France 2 had reached an agreement with the streaming platform Paramount+.

Eusebio Larrea and Georges Huercano, in charge of co-production at RTL Belgium, explained: "When producer Marc Dujardin (Collectif 64) and André Logie (Panache Productions) came to present the project to us more than a year and a half ago, we were immediately won over. Zorro is a legendary character and is very much present in the hearts of Belgians. It’s real cinema for television. The modern writing and direction immediately convinced us. Not to mention Jean Dujardin, who embodies a Zorro more real than life! We had the chance to witness the grand shoot in the heart of the Alhamilla Sierra in Spain, just minutes from Almería, and it was very impressive and captivating. We can’t wait for RTL TVI’s viewers to discover this ambitious project."

André Logie, Belgian producer at Panache Production, said: "To co-produce such a prestigious series is a childhood dream for me, as I watched the Zorro episodes [played by Guy Williams] on Antenne 2 in my youth. It’s a chance and the result of a long effort that started more than 20 years ago. This co-production was made possible thanks to RTL Belgium and Wallimage, for which I am deeply grateful. They got involved very early on and allowed the series to have a Belgian foundation. After shooting in Spain, all post-production will be done in Belgium."

The direction of the series was handled by Émilie Noblet and Jean-Baptiste Saurel. The budget is € 24 millions.

=== Production ===
Inspired by the legendary masked hero Zorro created by Johnston McCulley in 1919, the series is a co-production between Collectif 64 — the production company led by Marc Dujardin (brother of Jean Dujardin, who plays Zorro) — Bien sûr Productions, Montebello Productions, Panache Productions, La Compagnie Cinématographique, André Logie & Gaétan David, RTL Belgium, and RTL TVI. It is made with the participation of France Télévisions, CNC, and Wallimage, in association with Paramount+ and with support from Belgium's federal Tax Shelter and the Creative Europe Media TV & Online Content Program.

=== Casting ===
The role of Don Diego de la Vega is played by Jean Dujardin, who returns to television more than twenty years after being revealed in the comedy series Un gars, une fille (1999-2003).

The actor said in 2010 to the newspaper 20 Minutes: "Secretly, I’d love to play Zorro. Because he wears all black, he has a mask, and I could do fencing and horseback riding. I think it’s my last childhood desire. I’ve done some childhood stuff, like the secret agent (OSS 117, editor's note), the surfer (Brice de Nice), but I think Zorro... I still have these childhood desires, like costumes. It’s a real extension of childhood that this life offers me."

Jean Dujardin had already had the chance to realize his dream once in 2013 in the comedy series Platane, created by Éric Judor and Hafid F.-Benamar.

A Zorro fan since childhood, the actor further explained: "I had been talking about it for over ten years [...] I thought the role was slipping away from me. I was 40, and what’s funny is they wrote a Zorro of 50. It’s not the return of Zorro, it’s Zorro on the way out!" Jean Dujardin said he made Don Diego his own "without turning him into a masked OSS 117" and added, "I don’t think I missed my Zorro. It’s a proposal. It will either please or not, but it’s honest and sincere."

In November 2023, the sites Allociné and Ouest-France announced that André Dussollier and Grégory Gadebois joined Jean Dujardin in the cast of the series.

=== Filming ===
In November 2023, Jean Dujardin posted a photo on his Instagram account of himself as Don Diego de la Vega, accompanied by the caption: "Zorro en tournage bientôt." ("Zorro filming soon.")

On December 31, 2023, the actor shared a short video clip on his Instagram in which he is seen riding a black horse in front of a hacienda entrance, with the caption: "À cheval 2024 ! Bonne Année à tous." ("On horseback for 2024! Happy New Year to all.") The horse trainer is Mario Luraschi, the trainer for The Three Musketeers: D'Artagnan (2023) and stunt coordinator for Jappeloup (2012), who had previously worked alongside Jean Dujardin in Lucky Luke (2009).

Filming took place in southern Spain, in the Almería region and the Alhamilla Sierra, in a sandy, mountainous setting that resembles the American West — a region where Sergio Leone filmed several of his westerns and where Ridley Scott filmed Exodus: Gods and Kings (2014). € 23 millions euros were invested in building sets, including the small town of Los Angeles, a casino, peon houses, and an Indian village. Indoor scenes were filmed in Toledo, in 19th-century haciendas.

Jean Dujardin explained: "As for the fights, I rehearsed eight choreographies with Manu Lanzi and his fencing masters and stuntmen [...] As for the horse, I took lessons with Mario Luraschi."

== Reception ==
=== Audience and broadcast ===
==== In Belgium ====
In Belgium, the series was broadcast on Wednesday at 8:30 PM on RTL TVI from December 4 to 18 December 2024.

Episode	Broadcast		Average audience		Ref.
Episode	Day	Time slot	Number of viewers	Ranking	Ref.
1	Wednesday 4 December 2024	8:30 PM - 9:15 PM	315,505	1st	
2	Wednesday 4 December 2024	9:15 PM - 10 PM	315,505	1st	
3	Wednesday 4 December 2024	10 PM - 10:50 PM	315,505	1st	
4	Wednesday 11 December 2024	8:30 PM - 9:15 PM	216,529	2nd	
5	Wednesday 11 December 2024	9:15 PM - 9:55 PM	216,529	2nd	
6	Wednesday 11 December 2024	9:55 PM - 10:40 PM	216,529	2nd	
7	Wednesday 18 December 2024	8:30 PM - 9:15 PM	160,072	2nd	
8	Wednesday 18 December 2024	9:15 PM - 9:55 PM	160,072	2nd	
Season average			230,702		

The highest audience figures
The lowest audience figures

==== In France ====
In France, the series was broadcast on Mondays at 9:10 PM on France 2, in batches of four episodes on December 23 and 30 December 2024.

Episode	Broadcast		Average audience				Ref.
Episode	Day	Time	Number of viewers	Market share (for ages 4 and up)	Market share (FRDA-50)	Ranking (Note: The "audience ranking" is established by comparing the market share of the program for ages 4 and up with the market shares of other programs broadcast at the same time.)	Ref.
1	Monday 23 December 2024	9:10 PM - 9:50 PM	3,880,000	19,8 %	16,8 %	1st	
2	Monday 23 December 2024	9:50 PM - 10:25 PM	3,230,000	17,8 %	15,6 %	1st	
3	Monday 23 December 2024	10:25 PM - 11 PM	2,690,000	17,9 %	15,5 %	1st	
4	Monday 23 December 2024	11 PM - 11:45 PM	2,070,000	19,7 %	12,6 %	1st	
5	Monday 30 December 2024	9:10 PM - 9:50 PM	1,770,000	9,2 %		4th	
6	Monday 30 December 2024	9:50 PM - 10:25 PM	1,460,000	8.1 %		4th	
7	Monday 30 December 2024	10:25 PM - 11 PM	1,220,000	7.6 %		4th	
8	Monday 30 December 2024	11 PM - 11:40 PM	1,280,000	11.6 %		4th	
Season average			2,200,000				

The highest audience figures
The lowest audience figures

=== Critical reception ===
Le Parisien is somewhat reserved: "If one initially enjoys this light comedy with often absurd, sometimes hilarious dialogues, a few sword duels and well-crafted action scenes, and a successful aesthetic, one eventually becomes a bit tired, gradually. And as the episodes go on, one would like something more from this pure comedy, which is effective but lacks depth to sustain its appeal over time."

The CinéSérie website is more enthusiastic: "With a lot of humor and self-mockery, Jean Dujardin brings the legendary Zorro back to the screen, who resumes his duties after 20 years of absence, much to the delight of the audience."

Les Inrockuptibles believe that "While the series doesn’t always manage to strike a balance between the genres it flirts with, from pure adventure to romance, and doesn’t fully embrace its political fable dimension for the oppressed, it’s nice that it eventually finds its way into a territory of pure emotions. Zorro turns out to be more than just a family series with forced smiles (even though it’s that too), and that’s good news."

Libération was pleasantly surprised: "The series by Benjamin Charbit and Noé Debré, with the bankable actor in the role of the masked avenger, defies expectations and turns out to be delightfully kitsch and self-mocking […] This project, amidst the flourishing capes and swords genre, was a bit concerning. France Télévisions teams up with the Paramount+ platform to shoot a Zorro in Andalusia with the very bankable Jean Dujardin... Yet, just a few seconds in, all preconceived notions fall away."

L'Humanité is very enthusiastic: "The six-episode series is openly humorous, while reinventing the legend of Zorro, for the better. For, while embracing its origins, this Zorro aims to be devilishly modern."

Télé-Loisirs agrees with this: "A pleasant surprise, this particularly enjoyable mini-series upends the Zorro mythology, without tarnishing it […] In the end, while there were some apprehensions before diving into this adventure, one emerges surprised and having had a very good time!"

Sud Ouest highlights that "The creators of this series chose humor and self-mockery […] The result is good entertainment with hilarious moments and well-crafted action scenes."

For the Le Progrès newspaper, "thanks to a grand production that highlights the natural settings of Andalusia and an attention to detail, the timeless thrill of adventure is revived. And the humor doesn’t spoil this feeling, on the contrary. A very fine modernization."

The Le Figaro newspaper emphasizes Jean Dujardin’s performance: "His magnetic presence, the tone and sound of his voice, his sense of timing, his facial expressions, the humor he injects into every scene, every dialogue... Surely, we are flirting with parody, and sometimes it feels like being in OSS 117 or Mr. and Mrs. Smith, but these eight episodes are thoroughly enjoyable and at times even delightful."

For the Première magazine, "The overall rhythm doesn’t always hold: the fiction is overwhelmed by crude humor, and the plot sometimes goes in circles, dominated by the love triangle involving Don Diego, his wife, and the masked avenger. However, once the lens of interpretation is accepted, this new serialized version shows all the epic sense one could expect."

The Le Point newspaper gives a "warning to fans of Guy Williams: the Zorro of their childhood is dead and buried. Dead with laughter, that is. Once this premise is accepted, it’s enough to enter the game of the screenwriters Noé Debré and Benjamin Charbit, who portray Don Diego de la Vega as a weak man, overshadowed by his father’s legacy and incapable of fathering a child with his wife, who cheats on him with his double."

For Le Nouvel Obs, "Everything is skillfully put together, not to mention the very high-quality cast. Jean Dujardin has a blast in this double role of the cowardly husband and the over-the-top hero (one thinks of Bébel, his forever model), Audrey Dana excels as the neglected wife, André Dussollier and Eric Elmosnino are delightfully odious as powerful men, while Grégory Gadebois plays an emotional Sergeant Garcia."

According to Le Monde, "Benjamin Charbit and Noé Debré experiment a lot. They age the masked avenger, who takes two decades at once, marry him, give him political responsibilities, and burden him with financial worries. Of course, there will be sword duels and nocturnal rides, but most of the considerable energy spent on this project feeds not the legend of the liberator, but his midlife crisis."

Ouest-France headlines "Zorro reinvents himself with humor and self-mockery under the guise of a surprising Jean Dujardin" and considers the series to be "an astonishingly modern, funny, and generous version of the avenger myth."

The Swiss daily Le Temps "wonders if the whole project wasn’t created just to allow Jean Dujardin to pose in the mythic stance, the rearing horse, the hand saluting, the conquering look, and of course, the masked face under the round, black hat."

For France Culture, "the humor breaks the rhythm of the epic" but it is worth noting the performances of some secondary characters like Bernardo and Sergeant Garcia

For Alexandre Letren from VL-Media, "The series starts with good foundations, but overall it quickly fizzles out by making light of all the situations."

== Interactive game ==
The channel offers an innovative system allowing users to create their own personalized Zorro poster. By selecting their favorite character (Zorro, Don Diego, or Gabriella) and uploading or taking a selfie, fans can generate a unique poster. This creation can then be shared on social media with #Zorro.
