= Bernard Stora =

French director and screenwriter (born 1942)

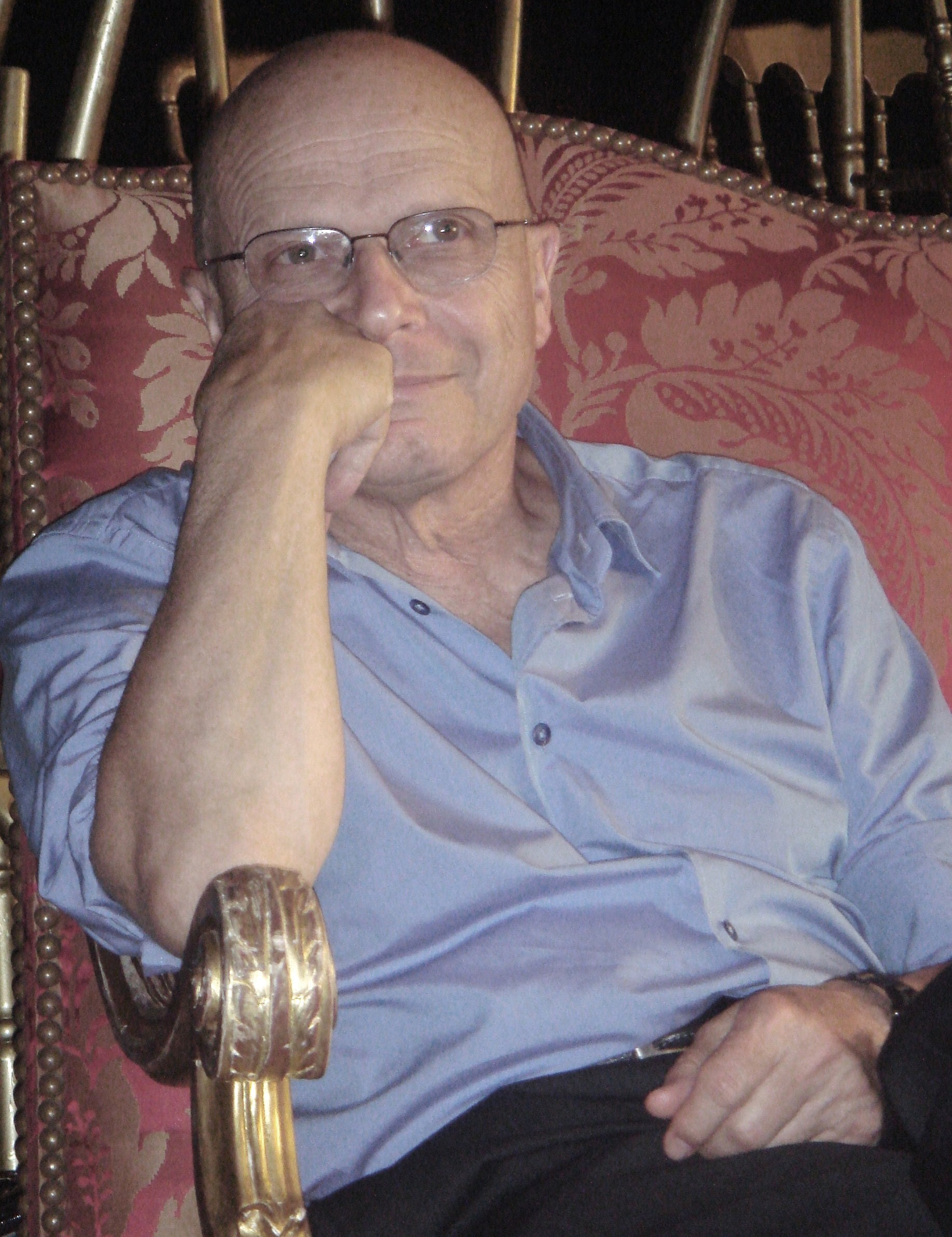
- Bernard Stora, in 2007.
- Born: 22 November 1942 (age 83); Marseille, France
- Occupations: Director, Screenwriter
- Years active: 1964-present

Bernard Stora (born 22 November 1942) is a French director and screenwriter.

== Filmography ==
Year	Title	Role	Box office	Notes
1964	Inferno	Assistant director	$400.000	Directed by Henri-Georges Clouzot
1964	Patate	Assistant director	$10.4 million	Directed by Robert Thomas
1966	Le Père Noël a les yeux bleus	Assistant director		Directed by Jean Eustache
1968	Le tatoué	Assistant director	$24.1 million	Directed by Denys de La Patellière
1968	Les cracks	Assistant director	$22.1 million	Directed by Alex Joffé
1969	Le clan des siciliens	Assistant director	$36.2 million	Directed by Henri Verneuil
1969	Staircase	Assistant director	$1.9 million	Directed by Stanley Donen
1970	Le Cercle Rouge	Assistant director	$32.5 million	Directed by Jean-Pierre Melville
1970	Darling Lili	Assistant director	$3.3 million	Directed by Blake Edwards
1971	The Married Couple of the Year Two	Assistant director	$21.2 million	Directed by Jean-Paul Rappeneau
1971	Un peu de soleil dans l'eau froide	Assistant director	$3.4 million	Directed by Jacques Deray
1971	The Burglars	Assistant director	$33.1 million	Directed by Henri Verneuil
1972	Le Tueur	Assistant director	$6.8 million	Directed by Denys de La Patellière
1973	The Mad Adventures of Rabbi Jacob	Assistant director	$54.7 million	Directed by Gérard Oury
1973	Story of a Love Story	Assistant director		Directed by John Frankenheimer
1975	French Connection II	Assistant director	$18.2 million	Directed by John Frankenheimer
1977	Shadow of the Castles	Assistant director		Directed by Daniel Duval
1978	La Carapate	Second Unit Director	$21.9 million	Directed by Gérard Oury
1978	La tortue sur le dos	Actor	$255.000	Directed by Luc Béraud
1979	L'adoption	Writer		Directed by Marc Grunebaum
1980	Three Men to Kill	Second Unit Director	$16.5 million	Directed by Jacques Deray
1980	The Umbrella Coup	Second Unit Director	$18.4 million	Directed by Gérard Oury
1981	For a Cop's Hide	Second Unit Director	$17.8 million	Directed by Alain Delon
1982	Le Choc	Second Unit Director	$11.3 million	Directed by Robin Davis
1982	All Fired Up	Second Unit Director	$17.1 million	Directed by Jean-Paul Rappeneau
1983	Le jeune marié	Director & writer	$3.2 million	
1983	Le Battant	Second Unit Director	$14.5 million	Directed by Alain Delon
1983	Pablo est mort	Writer		TV movie directed by Philippe Lefebvre
1984	The Judge	Writer		Directed by Philippe Lefebvre
1985	An Impudent Girl	Writer	$20.7 million	Directed by Claude Miller; Nominated - César Award for Best Original Screenplay or Adaptation
1985	True West	Adaptation		Play directed by Jean-Michel Ribes & Luc Béraud
1986	L'inconnue de Vienne	Director & writer		TV movie
1987	Vent de panique	Director & writer		
1988	La petite amie	Writer	$375.000	Directed by Luc Béraud
1989	À corps et à cris	Writer		TV movie directed by Josée Dayan
1990	Six crimes sans assassins	Director & writer		TV movie
1990	Le retour d'Arsène Lupin	Writer		TV series (1 episode) directed by Jordi Cadena
1991	La grande dune	Director & writer		TV movie
1991	All Out	Writer		Directed by Thomas Koerfer
1992	Max et Jérémie	Writer	$4.7 million	Directed by Claire Devers
1992	Stranger in the House	Writer	$3.1 million	Directed by Georges Lautner
1992	La femme à l'ombre	Writer		TV movie directed by Thierry Chabert
1993	The Flood	Writer		Directed by Igor Minaiev
1993	Partenaires	Director		Play
1994	Consentement mutuel	Director & writer	$1 million	
1994	La corruptrice	Director & writer		TV movie
1994	Les nuiteux	Writer		TV movie directed by Josée Dayan
1994	Couchettes express	Writer		TV movie directed by Luc Béraud
1996	Sixième classique	Director & writer		TV movie
1996	Crédit bonheur	Writer		TV movie directed by Luc Béraud
1997	Avocat d'office	Director & writer		TV series (1 episode)
1999	Un dérangement considérable	Director & writer		Cairo International Film Festival - Best Screenplay; Cairo International Film Festival - Golden Pyramid; Mons International Festival of Love Films - Prix Ciné Femme
1999	George Dandin	Director		TV movie
2000	Mémoires en fuite	Writer		TV movie directed François Marthouret
2001	Demain et tous les jours après	Director & writer		TV movie
2001	L'aîné des Ferchaux	Director & writer		TV mini-series
2002	Les amants de Mogador	Writer		TV movie directed Souheil Ben-Barka
2003	Une preuve d'amour	Director & writer		TV movie Luchon International Film Festival - Grand Prize French Fiction
2004	Suzie Berton	Director & writer		TV movie Festival du Film Policier de Cognac - Grand Prix Téléfilm
2004	Une autre vie	Writer		TV movie directed by Luc Béraud
2006	Le Grand Charles	Director, writer & Narrator		TV mini-series Festival de Programmes Audiovisuels - TV Series; Luchon International Film Festival - Grand Prize History; Nominated - Banff World Media Festival - Best Mini-Series
2008	Elles et Moi	Director & writer		TV mini-series
2010	Le 3e jour	Director & writer		TV movie
2011	Isabelle disparue	Director & writer		TV movie
2011	Celle que j'attendais	Director & writer		TV movie
2011	Bienvenue à Bouchon	Writer		TV movie directed by Luc Béraud
2013	La dernière campagne	Director & writer		TV movie Luchon International Film Festival - Best Screenplay
2013	Ce monde est fou	Writer		TV movie directed by Badreddine Mokrani
2014	La douce empoisonneuse	Director & writer		TV movie
2020	Villa Caprice	Director & writer		
