= Tristan Séguéla =

French filmmaker (born 1978)

- Tristan Séguéla at the 2026 Venice Film Festival
- Born: 19 September 1978 (age 48); Paris, France
- Occupation: Filmmaker
- Known for: The Netflix miniseries Class Act
- Father: Jacques Séguéla

Tristan Séguéla (born 19 September 1978) is a French film director and screenwriter, best known for the Netflix miniseries Class Act.

== Life and career ==
The son of the advertising executive Jacques Séguéla, Tristan studied at HEC Paris. In 2002, he directed a documentary, Les Communicants, about political communication experts. In 2013, he made his feature film debut with the comedy The Adulteen. Shortly later, Séguéla started working on a biopic about Bernard Tapie; the project, initially backed by Canal+, was blocked after the acquisition of the group by Tapie's friend Vincent Bolloré.

In 2019, Séguéla's feature film A Good Doctor, starring Michel Blanc, won the Grand Prix at the Liège International Comedy Film Festival. In 2023, Séguéla's long-gestating Tapie project now reworked as a seven-episode limited series, was released by Netflix with the title Class Act. The same year, he released his third feature, the comedy For Better And For Worse, starring Fabrice Luchini and Catherine Frot.

In 2025, Séguéla directed Mercato, a thriller starring Jamel Debbouze. His 2026 film The Good Lawyer premiered out of competition at the 83rd Venice International Film Festival.

== Filmography ==
- The Adulteen (2013)
- Rattrapage (2017)
- A Good Doctor (2019)
- For Better And For Worse (2023)
- Class Act (miniseries, 2023)
- Mercato (2025)
- The Good Lawyer (2026)
