= Émilie Noblet =

French film director, screenwriter and cinematographer

- Education: La Fémis
- Occupations: Film director; television director; screenwriter; cinematographer
- Years active: 2012–present

Émilie Noblet is a French film and television director, screenwriter and cinematographer.

== Biography ==
Émilie Noblet is from the Puy-de-Dôme department. She studied literature before turning to cinema and specializing in cinematography. She graduated from La Fémis in 2013, from the Image department.

She worked as a cinematographer on several short and feature films while also directing her own short films. Her cinematography credits include Jeune Femme (2017), directed by Léonor Serraille, and Tout ce qu'il me reste de la révolution (2018), directed by Judith Davis.

== Career ==
Noblet directed her first short film, Là-bas, la mer, in 2012. She subsequently directed À propos d'Anna and Trucs de gosse in 2013, TGV in 2014, and L'Algorithme de Monte-Carlo in 2016.

She subsequently directed television productions, including HP, Loulou, Parlement and The 7 Lives of Léa. She also directed the television series Zorro with Jean-Baptiste Saurel.

== Bis Repetita ==
Noblet made her feature-film directing debut with Bis Repetita, a French-Italian comedy released in France on 20 March 2024. She co-wrote the screenplay with Clémence Dargent.

The film stars Louise Bourgoin as Delphine, a disillusioned teacher who gives her pupils exceptionally high grades in exchange for being left alone. When their results lead the class to an international Latin competition in Naples, Delphine is forced to accompany them.

Bis Repetita was Noblet's first feature film. Before making it, she had worked as a cinematographer on feature films including Jeune Femme and Tout ce qu'il me reste de la révolution, and had directed television series including Irresponsable, Loulou, HP and Parlement.

== Filmography ==
=== Director ===
Year	Title	Notes
2012	Là-bas, la mer	Short film
2013	À propos d'Anna	Short film
2013	Trucs de gosse	Short film
2014	TGV	Short film; co-written with Thomas Pujol
2016	L'Algorithme de Monte-Carlo	Short film
2018	HP	Television series
2019	Loulou	Television series
2020	Parlement	Television series
2022	The 7 Lives of Léa	Television series
2023	Loulou	Television film
2024	Bis Repetita	Feature film
2024	Zorro	Television series; co-directed with Jean-Baptiste Saurel
2026	Dix Pour Cent	Premiered at Angoulême and streamed on Netflix

=== Screenwriter ===
Year	Title	Notes
2012	Là-bas, la mer	Short film
2013	À propos d'Anna	Short film
2013	Trucs de gosse	Short film
2014	TGV	Short film; co-written with Thomas Pujol
2016	L'Algorithme de Monte-Carlo	Short film
2020	Brigade Mobile	Web series
2023	Loulou	Television film
2024	Bis Repetita	Feature film; co-written with Clémence Dargent

=== Cinematographer ===
Year	Title	Director
2013	À propos d'Anna	Émilie Noblet
2016	Body	Léonor Serraille
2017	Jeune Femme	Léonor Serraille
2018	Tout ce qu'il me reste de la révolution	Judith Davis
2019	Prends garde à toi	Emma Benestan
2020	Prends garde à toi	Emma Benestan

== Awards and nominations ==
Noblet's short film Trucs de gosse received awards at several festivals in 2013, including the Grand Prix, Audience Award and Best Actress award at the Festival du film européen de Lille, as well as the Canal+ Award at the Clermont-Ferrand International Short Film Festival.

== Bibliography ==
- "Bis Repetita — Dossier de presse" (PDF) (in French). Unifrance. 2024.
- "Emilie Noblet" (in French). Short Film Wire.
- "Émilie Noblet : Filmographie". AlloCiné.
- "Bis Repetita de Émilie Noblet" (in French). Unifrance.
- Reumont, François (22 May 2017). "La directrice de la photographie Emilie Noblet parle de son travail sur « Jeune femme », de Léonor Serraille" (in French). Association française des directeurs de la photographie.
- "Anecdotes du film Bis Repetita" (in French). AlloCiné.
