= Philippe Lefebvre (film director) =

French filmmaker (born 1941)

- Born: 14 May 1941 (age 84); Algiers, Alger, France
- Occupation: Filmmaker
- Notable work: The Judge

Philippe Lefebvre (born 14 May 1941 in Algiers, Alger, France) is a French filmmaker.

Best known as a director and writer, Lefebvre received a nomination for Best Picture at the 1984 Mystfest for his crime-drama film The Judge, which he wrote and directed.
