= List of French films of 2024 =

This is a list of French films that are scheduled to release in 2024, including co-productions with other countries.

== Box office and budgets ==
=== Domestic ===
The highest-grossing French films released in 2024, by domestic box office, are as follows:

*	Denotes films still running in French cinemas

Highest-grossing films of 2024 (France)
Rank	Overall rank	Title	Distributor	Domestic attendance	Domestic gross (Note: Estimated)	Weeks in release
1	1	A Little Something Extra*	Pan-Européenne	10,766,054	€77,946,000	26
2	2	The Count of Monte Cristo*	Pathé	9,074,443	€65,699,000	18
3	9	Ooh La La	SND	1,956,287	€14,164,000	28
4	12	Oldies but Goodies	Apollo Films	1,557,651	€11,277,000	22
5	19	Cat & Dog	Gaumont	1,122,884	€8,130,000	16
6	23	Emilia Pérez*	Pathé	1,029,100	€7,451,000	10
7	19	Beating Hearts*	StudioCanal	1,001,108	€7,248,000	2
8	21	Autumn and the Black Jaguar	StudioCanal	993,911	€7,196,000	26
9	22	Ducobu Goes Green!	UGC	985,898	€7,138,000	18
10	30	Brothers*	Zinc Film	679,327	€4,918,000	27
11	35	An Ordinary Case*	Zinc Film	674,814	€4,886,000	7
12	39	Riviera Revenge*	Wild Bunch	577,924	€4,184,000	27
13	40	Meet the Leroys	Apollo Films	551,819	€3,995,000	23
14	41	When Fall Is Coming*	Diaphana Distribution	528,241	€3,825,000	4
15	41	The Second Act	Diaphana Distribution	491,465	€3,558,000	21
16	43	Daaaaaalí!*	Diaphana Distribution	482,718	€3,495,000	37
17	44	Pimp My Bride*	SND	478,567	€3,465,000	5
18	44	Breaking Point	SND	474,817	€3,438,000	16
19	44	The Seed of the Sacred Fig*	Pyramide Films	469,432	€3,399,000	6
20	46	The Magic Book*	SND	441,558	€3,197,000	12

=== Worldwide ===
The highest-grossing French films released in 2024, by worldwide box office, are as follows:

*	Denotes films still running in cinemas

Highest-grossing films of 2024 (Worldwide)
Rank	Title	French Distributor	Worldwide gross (Note: Estimated)
1	A Little Something Extra*	Pan-Européenne	€86,094,000
2	The Count of Monte Cristo	Pathé	€77,665,000
3	Autumn and the Black Jaguar*	StudioCanal	€23,809,000
4	Ooh La La*	SND	€21,160,000
5	Oldies but Goodies*	Apollo Films	€12,101,000
6	Cat & Dog*	Gaumont	€10,765,000
7	Emilia Pérez*	Pathé	€8,045,000
8	Ducobu Goes Green!*	UGC	€7,693,000
9	Io Capitano*	Pathé	€7,132,000
10	Beating Hearts*	StudioCanal	€7,248,000
11	Riviera Revenge*	Wild Bunch	€6,627,000
12	An Ordinary Case*	Zinc Film	€5,422,000
13	Maria Montessori*	Ad Vitam Distribution	€4,935,000
14	Brothers*	Zinc Film	€4,918,000
15	Meet the Leroys*	Apollo Films	€3,995,000
16	The Second Act*	Diaphana Distribution	€3,872,000
17	When Fall Is Coming*	Diaphana Distribution	€3,825,000
18	Boléro*	SND	€3,775,000
19	Daaaaaalí!*	Diaphana Distribution	€3,581,000
20	The Inventor*	KMBO Films	€3,466,000

=== Most expensive films ===
The most expensive French films of 2024 are as follows:

Most expensive French films of 2024
Rank	Title	Distributor	Budget
1	The Count of Monte Cristo	Pathé	€42,900,000
2	Beating Hearts	StudioCanal	€35,700,000
3	Monsieur Aznavour	Pathé	€26,000,000
4	Zak & Wowo: La Légende de Lendarys	Sirius Media	€25,000,000
5	Emilia Pérez	Pathé	€24,990,000
6	Under Paris	Netflix	€19,600,000
7	Cat & Dog	Gaumont	€19,262,000
8	This Is the Goat!	Pathé	€19,000,000
9	Emmanuelle	Pathé	€18,000,000
10	The Wages of Fear	Netflix	€16,600,000
11	The Price of Money: A Largo Winch Adventure	Pan-Européenne	€16,370,000
12	Saint-Ex	StudioCanal	€14,770,000
13	Mercato	Pathé	€13,000,000
13	The Palace	Swashbuckler Films	€13,000,000
15	Elyas	StudioCanal	€12,920,000
16	You're Not the One I Expected	Haut et Court	€12,560,000
17	The Most Precious of Cargoes	StudioCanal	€12,440,000
18	Boléro	SND	€12,410,000
19	And Their Children After Them	Warner Bros. Pictures	€12,000,000
20	Oldies but Goodies	Apollo Films	€11,540,000

=== Theatrical profitability ===
*	Denotes films still running in cinemas

Most profitable French films of 2024
Rank	Title	Distributor	Budget	Worldwide gross (Note: Estimated)	Theatrical profitability
1	A Little Something Extra*	Pan-Européenne	€6,715,000	€86,094,000	1282.1%
2	Autumn and the Black Jaguar	StudioCanal	€10,400,000	€23,809,000	228.9%
3	Ooh La La*	SND	€10,000,000	€21,160,000	211.6%
4	The Count of Monte Cristo*	Pathé	€42,900,000	€77,665,000	181%
5	Maria Montessori*	Ad Vitam Distribution	€3,600,000	€4,935,000	137.1%
6	Riviera Revenge*	Wild Bunch	€5,200,000	€6,627,000	127.4%
7	Brothers*	Zinc Film	€3,900,000	€4,918,000	126.1%
8	Oldies but Goodies*	Apollo Films	€11,540,000	€12,101,000	104.9%
9	An Ordinary Case*	Zinc Film	€6,400,000	€5,422,000	84.7%
10	The Good Teacher*	Ad Vitam Distribution	€3,850,000	€2,975,000	77.3%
11	Ducobu Goes Green!*	UGC	€10,000,000	€7,693,000	76.9%
12	Maybe More*	Wild Bunch	€2,600,000	€1,974,000	75.9%
13	Love Boat*	UGC	€4,600,000	€3,207,000	69.7%
14	Meet the Leroys*	Apollo Films	€5,791,000	€3,995,000	69%
15	Auction*	Pyramide Films	€4,000,000	€2,646,000	66.1%
16	Io Capitano*	Pathé	€10,800,000	€7,132,000	66%
17	The Second Act*	Diaphana Distribution	€6,600,000	€3,872,000	58.7%
18	Cat & Dog	Gaumont	€19,262,000	€10,765,000	55.9%
19	It's Raining Men	Diaphana Distribution	€4,700,000	€2,570,000	54.7%
20	A Good Jewish Boy*	Ad Vitam Distribution	€2,500,000	€1,363,000	54.5%
21	This Is My Mother*	KMBO Films	€2,100,000	€1,140,000	54.3%
22	Daaaaaalí!*	Diaphana Distribution	€6,700,000	€3,581,000	53.5%
23	Breaking Point	SND	€6,570,000	€3,462,000	52.7%
24	Lucky Winners*	Warner Bros. Pictures	€6,670,000	€3,136,000	47%
25	Like a Prince	Apollo Films	€3,950,000	€1,764,000	44.7%
26	14 Days to Feel Better*	Wild Bunch	€5,000,000	€2,236,000	44.7%
27	The Dreamer*	New Story Films	€1,270,000	€540,000	42.5%
28	Inshallah a Boy*	Pyramide Films	€800,000	€332,000	41.4%

Least profitable French films of 2024
Rank	Title	Distributor	Budget	Worldwide gross (Note: Estimated)	Theatrical Profitability
1	The Last Dance	SOUTHfilms	€100,000	€100	0.1%
2	Holy Week	Shellac Films	€1,250,000	€3,100	0.3%
3	Heartless*	Les Valseurs	€1,300,000	€7,900	0.6%
3	The Last Men	Tandem Films	€7,500,000	€43,000	0.6%
5	No One and Nothing	La Vingt-Cinquième Heure	€1,200,000	€10,700	0.9%
6	Holly	New Story Films	€2,700,000	€26,500	1%
7	The Falling Star	Potemkine Films	€3,100,000	€33,000	1.1%
8	So Close to the Sun	Leva Productions	€90,000	€1,300	1.5%
9	Autobiography	Destiny Films	€335,000	€7,000	2.1%
10	Double Foyer	Nour Films	€900,000	€27,000	3%
11	Eureka*	Le Pacte	€2,800,000	€89,000	3.2%
11	Ma Part de Gaulois*	Alba Films	€2,120,000	€67,000	3.2%
13	Let Me Go*	Eurozoom	€3,340,000	€123,000	3.7%
14	Tiger Stripes	Jour2Fête	€834,000	€31,600	3.8%
15	Through the Night*	Haut et Court	€3,077,000	€124,000	4%
16	Four Little Adults	Haut et Court	€1,801,000	€77,000	4.3%
17	Funny Birds	UGC	€5,400,000	€248,000	4.6%
18	Le Bonheur est pour Demain	Paradis Films	€2,630,000	€137,000	5.2%
19	This Is the Goat!*	Pathé	€19,000,000	€1,314,000	6.9%
19	The Palace*	Swashbuckler Films	€13,000,000	€900,000	6.9%
20	Headwind	Pan-Européenne	€4,660,000	€325,000	7%

== Release date changes ==
Initially announced for a December 11th release, The Count of Monte Cristo, the most expensive French film of the year, was brought forward a little over five months to June 28th in late January. It was noted that the film would thus be able take advantage of the Fête du cinéma promotional event beginning two days later, but would also be competing for attention with the UEFA Euro 2024 tournament happening at the same time.

== January–March ==
⌀ Denotes a film that was publicly screened prior to 2024, be it through film festivals, premieres or releases in other countries
† Denotes a film released through a streaming service, not theatrically
‡ Denotes a film primarily not in the French language

Opening		English Title	Native Title	Director	Cast	Studio	Ref.
J A N U A R Y	3	Cottage Core ⌀	Koban Louzoù	Brieuc Schieb	Audrey Carmes, Neel, Laurence Sanchez	Petit Chaos	
J A N U A R Y	3	Four Little Adults ⌀‡	Neljä Pientä Aikuista	Selma Vilhunen	Alma Pöysti, Eero Milonoff, Oona Airola, Pietu Wikström	Haut et Court	
J A N U A R Y	3	Io Capitano ⌀‡	Io Capitano	Matteo Garrone	Seydou Sarr, Moustapha Fall, Issaka Sawagodo	Pathé	
J A N U A R Y	3	La Hess ⌀	La Hess	Alexandre Lemoine-Courx	Pierre Colleau, Elyes Sabyani, Séléna Diouf	Saint-André-des-Arts	
J A N U A R Y	3	It's Raining Men ⌀	Iris et les Hommes	Caroline Vignal	Laure Calamy, Vincent Elbaz, Suzanne de Baecque, Sylvain Katan, Laurent Poitrenaux, IZM	Diaphana Distribution	
J A N U A R Y	10	A Silence	Un Silence	Joachim Lafosse	Daniel Auteuil, Emmanuelle Devos, Jeanne Cherhal, Louise Chevillotte	Les Films du Losange	
J A N U A R Y	10	Bonnard, Pierre and Marthe ⌀	Bonnard, Pierre et Marthe	Martin Provost	Cécile de France, Vincent Macaigne, Stacy Martin, Anouk Grinberg, Grégoire Leprince-Ringuet, André Marcon	Memento Distribution	
J A N U A R Y	10	If Only I Could Hibernate ⌀‡	Баавгай болохсон	Zoljargal Purevdash	Battsooj Uurtsaikh, Nominjiguur Tsend, Tuguldur Batsaikhan	Eurozoom	
J A N U A R Y	10	Making Of ⌀	Making Of	Cédric Kahn	Denis Podalydès, Jonathan Cohen, Stefan Crepon, Souheila Yacoub, Emmanuelle Bercot, Xavier Beauvois, Valérie Donzelli	Ad Vitam Distribution	
J A N U A R Y	10	The Last Dance ⌀	La Dernière Danse	Sabry Jarod	Jessica Errero, Sabry Jarod	SOUTHfilms	
J A N U A R Y	17	Le Voyage en Pyjama ⌀	Le Voyage en Pyjama	Pascal Thomas	Alexandre Lafaurie, Constance Labbé, Lolita Chammah, Louis-Do de Lencquesaing, Barbara Schulz, Anouchka Delon, Emmanuelle Bouaziz, Irène Jacob, Hippolyte Girardot, Pierre Arditi, Claude Perron, Anny Duperey, Marguerite Perrotte, Philippe Lelièvre, Stéphanie Crayencour, Christian Vadim, Maïra Schmitt, Laurent Dassault, Raphaèle Bouchard, Oriane Rebours	StudioCanal	
J A N U A R Y	17	Like a Prince ⌀	Comme un Prince	Ali Marhyar	Ahmed Sylla, Julia Piaton, Mallory Wanecque, Habib Dembélé, Tewfik Jallab, Jonathan Cohen, Jonathan Lambert, Cécile Bois	Apollo Films	
J A N U A R Y	17	So Close to the Sun	Si Proche du Soleil	Benjamin Rancoule	Quentin Santarelli, Maylis de Poncins, Pierre Ménès	Leva Productions	
J A N U A R Y	17	The Girl from Tomorrow ⌀‡	Primadonna	Marta Savina	Claudia Gusmano, Fabrizio Ferracane, Francesco Colella, Manuela Ventura, Dario Aita, Thony, Gaetano Aronica	Destiny Films	
J A N U A R Y	17	Winter Crossing ⌀	La Tête Froide	Stéphane Marchetti	Florence Loiret Caille, Saabo Balde, Jonathan Couzinié, Aurélia Petit	UFO Distribution	
J A N U A R Y	24	A Good Jewish Boy	Le Dernier des Juifs	Noé Debré	Michaël Zindel, Agnès Jaoui, Solal Bouloudnine	Ad Vitam Distribution	
J A N U A R Y	24	Breaking Point ⌀	Un Coup de Dés	Yvan Attal	Guillaume Canet, Marie-Josée Croze, Yvan Attal, Maïwenn, Victor Belmondo, Alma Jodorowsky	SND	
J A N U A R Y	24	Party of Fools ⌀	Captives	Arnaud des Pallières	Mélanie Thierry, Josiane Balasko, Marina Foïs, Carole Bouquet, Yolande Moreau, Dominique Frot, Elina Löwensohn, Solène Rigot, Miss Ming, Lucie Zhang	Wild Bunch	
J A N U A R Y	24	The Dreamer ⌀	L'Homme d'Argile	Anaïs Tellenne	Raphaël Thiéry, Emmanuelle Devos, Marie-Christine Orry	New Story Films	
J A N U A R Y	26	Numéro 10 †	Numéro 10	David Diane	Ibrahima Diallo, Ilyes Djadel, Matthias Quiviger, Camille Chamoux, Jean-Baptiste Anoumon, Adel Bencherif, Bun Hay Mean, Ciryl Gane, Djibril Cissé, Patrice Evra, Abdou Diallo, Daniel Riolo, Gilbert Brisbois, Vegedream, Thomas Le Souder	Amazon Prime Video	
J A N U A R Y	31	Headwind	Sous le Vent des Marquises	Pierre Godeau	François Damiens, Salomé Dewaels, Roman Kolinka, Anne Coesens	Pan-Européenne	
J A N U A R Y	31	Le Bonheur est pour Demain ⌀	Le Bonheur est pour Demain	Brigitte Sy	Laetitia Casta, Damien Bonnard, Béatrice Dalle	Paradis Films	
J A N U A R Y	31	M. & Mme Toutlemonde ⌀	M. & Mme Toutlemonde	Jean-Michel Noirey	Blandine Mouret, Erika Regimbeau, Pascale Maupin	Aviva Films	
J A N U A R Y	31	Ma Part de Gaulois	Ma Part de Gaulois	Malik Chibane	Adila Bendimerad, Abdallah Charki, Lyes Salem	Alba Films	
J A N U A R Y	31	The Falling Star ⌀	L'Étoile Filante	Dominique Abel and Fiona Gordon	Dominique Abel and Fiona Gordon, Kaori Ito	Potemkine Films	
J A N U A R Y	31	The Inventor ⌀‡	The Inventor	Jim Capobianco & Pierre-Luc Granjon	Stephen Fry, Marion Cotillard, Daisy Ridley	KMBO Films	
J A N U A R Y	31	They Shot the Piano Player ⌀‡	They Shot the Piano Player	Fernando Trueba & Javier Mariscal	Jeff Goldblum, Roberta Wallach, Tony Ramos, Alejandra Flechner	Dulac Distribution	
F E B R U A R Y	7	Autumn and the Black Jaguar ‡	Autumn and the Black Jaguar	Gilles de Maistre	Lumi Pollack, Emily Bett Rickards, Wayne Charles Baker, Paul Greene	StudioCanal	
F E B R U A R Y	7	Daaaaaalí! ⌀	Daaaaaalí!	Quentin Dupieux	Anaïs Demoustier, Gilles Lellouche, Édouard Baer, Jonathan Cohen, Pio Marmaï, Didier Flamand, Romain Duris, Agnès Hurstel, Marie Bunel	Diaphana Distribution	
F E B R U A R Y	7	Green Border ⌀‡	Zielona Granica	Agnieszka Holland	Jalal Altawil, Maja Ostaszewska, Tomasz Włosok, Behi Djanati Atai	Condor Entertainment	
F E B R U A R Y	7	Kensuke's Kingdom ⌀‡	Kensuke's Kingdom	Neil Boyle & Kirk Hendry	Sally Hawkins, Cillian Murphy, Ken Watanabe, Raffey Cassidy	Le Pacte	
F E B R U A R Y	7	Ooh La La	Cocorico	Julien Hervé	Christian Clavier, Didier Bourdon, Sylvie Testud, Marianne Denicourt, Julien Pestel, Chloé Coulloud, Patrick Préjean	SND	
F E B R U A R Y	7	Opération Portugal 2: La Vie de Château	Opération Portugal 2: La Vie de Château	Frank Cimière	D'jal, Grégoire Bonnet, Aurélie Boquien, Sarah Perles	Sony Pictures	
F E B R U A R Y	7	The Beast ⌀‡	La Bête	Bertrand Bonello	Léa Seydoux, George MacKay, Guslagie Malanda, Dasha Nekrasova, Elina Löwensohn, Julia Faure	Ad Vitam Distribution	
F E B R U A R Y	14	Cat & Dog	Chien et Chat	Reem Kherici	Franck Dubosc, Reem Kherici, Philippe Lacheau, Inès Reg, Artus	Gaumont	
F E B R U A R Y	14	Molière's Last Stage	Le Molière Imaginaire	Olivier Py	Laurent Lafitte, Stacy Martin, Jeanne Balibar, Judith Magre, Dominique Frot, Catherine Lachens, Olivier Py	Memento Distribution	
F E B R U A R Y	14	Oldies but Goodies	Maison de Retraite 2	Claude Zidi Jr.	Kev Adams, Jean Reno, Daniel Prévost, Liliane Rovère, Firmine Richard, Michel Jonasz, Enrico Macias, Amanda Lear, Chantal Ladesou, Jarry, Stéphane Debac, Louna Espinosa, Anne Marivin, Marie-Christine Barrault, Gérard Depardieu	Apollo Films	
F E B R U A R Y	14	On the Pulse ⌀	Vivants	Alix Delaporte	Alice Isaaz, Roschdy Zem, Vincent Elbaz, Pascale Arbillot, Pierre Lottin, Grégoire Leprince-Ringuet	Pyramide Films	
F E B R U A R Y	21	Autobiography ⌀‡	Autobiography	Makbul Mubarak	Kevin Ardilova, Arswendy Bening Swara, Yusuf Mahardika, Lukman Sardi, Yudi Ahmad Tajudin, Rukman Rosadi	Destiny Films	
F E B R U A R Y	21	Double Foyer ⌀	Double Foyer	Claire Vassé	Émilie Dequenne, Max Boublil, Michel Jonasz, Pierre Rochefort, Françoise Lebrun	Nour Films	
F E B R U A R Y	21	Funny Birds ‡	Funny Birds	Hanna Ladoul & Marco La Via	Catherine Deneuve, Andrea Riseborough, Morgan Saylor, John Robinson	UGC	
F E B R U A R Y	21	The Empire	L'Empire	Bruno Dumont	Camille Cottin, Anamaria Vartolomei, Fabrice Luchini, Lyna Khoudri	ARP Sélection	
F E B R U A R Y	21	The Last Men ⌀	Les Derniers Hommes	David Oelhoffen	Guido Caprino, Andrzej Chyra, Nuno Lopes	Tandem Films	
F E B R U A R Y	21	The Successor ⌀	Le Successeur	Xavier Legrand	Marc-André Grondin, Yves Jacques, Anne-Élisabeth Bossé	Haut et Court	
F E B R U A R Y	21	This Is the Goat!	Les Chèvres!	Fred Cavayé	Dany Boon, Jérôme Commandeur, Claire Chust, Vincent Grass, Grégory Gadebois, Marie-Anne Chazel, Grégory Gadebois	Pathé	
F E B R U A R Y	28	Black Tea ‡	Black Tea	Abderrahmane Sissako	Nina Mélo, Chang Han, Wu Ke-xi	Gaumont	
F E B R U A R Y	28	Eureka ⌀‡	Eureka	Lisandro Alonso	Viggo Mortensen, Chiara Mastroianni, José María Yazpik, Rafi Pitts	Le Pacte	
F E B R U A R Y	28	Fallen from the Truck	Tombés du Camion	Philippe Pollet-Villard	Patrick Timsit, Valérie Bonneton, Sébastien Chassagne, Karim Barras, Mélanie Doutey, Samir Guesmi, Serge Riaboukine	Zinc Film	
F E B R U A R Y	28	Madame de Sévigné ⌀	Madame de Sévigné	Isabelle Brocard	Karin Viard, Ana Girardot, Cédric Kahn, Noémie Lvovsky, Robin Renucci	Ad Vitam Distribution	
F E B R U A R Y	28	No One and Nothing ⌀	Rien Ni Personne	Gallien Guibert	Paul Hamy, Suliane Brahim, Françoise Lebrun, Sam Louwyck	La Vingt-Cinquième Heure	
F E B R U A R Y	28	No Shade in the Desert	Il N'y A Pas d'Ombre dans le Désert	Yossi Aviram	Valeria Bruni Tedeschi, Yona Rozenkier, Germaine Unikovsky, Jackie Berroyer, Roni Alter	Les Films du Losange	
M A R C H	6	14 Days to Feel Better	14 Jours pour Aller Mieux	Édouard Pluvieux	Maxime Gasteuil, Zabou Breitman, Romain Lancry, Lionel Abelanski, Chantal Lauby, Michel Boujenah, Bernard Farcy	Wild Bunch	
M A R C H	6	Boléro	Boléro	Anne Fontaine	Raphaël Personnaz, Doria Tillier, Jeanne Balibar, Vincent Perez, Emmanuelle Devos, Sophie Guillemin, Anne Alvaro, Marie Denarnaud, Serge Riaboukine	SND	
M A R C H	6	Holly ⌀‡	Holly	Fien Troch	Cathalina Geraerts, Greet Verstraete, Felix Heremans	New Story Films	
M A R C H	6	Inshallah a Boy ⌀‡	ان شاء الله ولد	Amjad Al Rasheed	Mouna Hawa, Haitham Omari, Yumna Marwan, Salwa Nakkara	Pyramide Films	
M A R C H	6	Like a Son	Comme un Fils	Nicolas Boukhrief	Vincent Lindon, Karole Rocher	Le Pacte	
M A R C H	6	Shikun	Shikun	Amos Gitai	Irène Jacob, Yael Abecassis, Hana Laszlo	Epicentre Films	
M A R C H	6	Sisterhood	HLM Pussy	Nora El Hourch	Leah Aubert, Médina Diarra, Salma Takaline, Oscar Al Hafiane, Bérénice Bejo	Paname Distribution	
M A R C H	6	This Is My Mother ⌀	La Vie de Ma Mère	Julien Carpentier	Agnès Jaoui, William Lebghil, Alison Wheeler	KMBO Films	
M A R C H	13	Being Blanche Houellebecq	Dans la Peau de Blanche Houellebecq	Guillaume Nicloux	Blanche Gardin, Michel Houellebecq, Françoise Lebrun, Gaspar Noé, Jean-Pascal Zadi, Francky Vincent	BAC Films	
M A R C H	13	Diógenes ⌀‡	Diógenes	Leonardo Barbuy La Torre	Gisela Yupa, Cleiner Yupa, Jorge Pomacanchari	Bobine Films	
M A R C H	13	Lucky Winners	Heureux Gagnants	Maxime Govare & Romain Choay	Fabrice Éboué, Audrey Lamy, Anouk Grinberg, Pauline Clément, Louise Coldefy, Sami Outalbali, Victor Meutelet, Guy Lecluyse, Sam Karmann	Warner Bros. Pictures	
M A R C H	13	Maria Montessori ⌀	La Nouvelle Femme	Léa Todorov	Jasmine Trinca, Leïla Bekhti, Agathe Bonitzer	Ad Vitam Distribution	
M A R C H	13	Nome ⌀‡	Nome	Sana Na N'Hada	Marcelino António Ingira, Binete Undonque, Marta Dabo	The Dark Films	
M A R C H	13	Rachel's Game ⌀	Les Rois de la Piste	Thierry Klifa	Fanny Ardant, Mathieu Kassovitz, Laetitia Dosch, Nicolas Duvauchelle, Ben Attal, Michel Vuillermoz	Apollo Films	
M A R C H	13	Tiger Stripes ⌀‡	Tiger Stripes	Amanda Nell Eu	Zafreen Zairizal, Deena Ezral, Piqa, Shaheizy Sam	Jour2Fête	
M A R C H	15	Sirens †	Sirènes	Adeline Picault	Alice Pol, Shirine Boutella, Natacha Lindinger, Ramzy Bedia, Serge Hazanavicius, Giovanni Cirfiera, Jérémy Gillet, Medi Sadoun	Amazon Prime Video	
M A R C H	20	A Family	Une Famille	Christine Angot	Christine Angot	Nour Films	
M A R C H	20	At Averroès & Rosa Parks	Averroès et Rosa Parks	Nicolas Philibert	—N/a	Les Films du Losange	
M A R C H	20	Karaoke	Karaoké	Stéphane Ben Lahcene	Michèle Laroque, Claudia Tagbo, David Mora, Sébastien Chassagne	UGC	
M A R C H	20	Latin for All	Bis Repetita	Émilie Noblet	Louise Bourgoin, Xavier Lacaille, Noémie Lvovsky, Francesco Montanari	Le Pacte	
M A R C H	20	Les Poussières	Les Poussières	Jean-Claude Taki	Marc Barbé, Ania Svetovaya, Cédric Kahn	Apatom	
M A R C H	20	Let Me Go ⌀	Laissez-moi	Maxime Rappaz	Jeanne Balibar, Thomas Sarbacher	Eurozoom	
M A R C H	20	Out of Season ⌀	Hors-Saison	Stéphane Brizé	Guillaume Canet, Alba Rohrwacher	Gaumont	
M A R C H	27	L'Attaque du Bloc d'Or	L'Attaque du Bloc d'Or	Olivier Goujon	Julien Rochard, Dimitri Kuzerpa, Nicolas Bedu	Festizicnema	
M A R C H	27	La Lettre (Voyage au Pays d’Avant)#Me-Too -2) ⌀	La Lettre (Voyage au Pays d’Avant #Me-Too -2)	Jean-Louis Cros	Anita Schultz-Moszkowski, Charles Calhanas, Didier Moreira	Saint-André-des-Arts	
M A R C H	27	Morrison ⌀‡	มอร์ริสัน	Phuttiphong Aroonpheng	Chulachak Chakrabongse, Chicha Amatayakul, Joe Cummings	Jour2Fête	
M A R C H	27	Nous Serons Toujours Là! Plogoff 1980	Nous Serons Toujours Là! Plogoff 1980	Nicolas Guillou	Alexandra Robert, Louison Guillou Robert, Sophie Neveu	Vent d'Ouest Distribution	
M A R C H	27	Paternel	Paternel	Ronan Tronchot	Grégory Gadebois, Géraldine Nakache, Lyes Salem, Noam Morgensztern, Jacques Boudet, Françoise Lebrun, Bruno Le Millin	KMBO Films	
M A R C H	27	The Good Teacher	Pas de Vagues	Teddy Lussi-Modeste	François Civil, Shaïn Boumedine, Mallory Wanecque, Agnès Hurstel	Ad Vitam Distribution	
M A R C H	27	The Green Deal	La Promesse Verte	Édouard Bergeon	Alexandra Lamy, Félix Moati, Sofian Khammes, Julie Chen, Antoine Bertrand, Philippe Torreton	Diaphana Distribution	
M A R C H	29	The Wages of Fear †	Le Salaire de la Peur	Julien Leclercq	Franck Gastambide, Alban Lenoir, Sofiane Zermani, Ana Girardot, Bakary Diombera, Astrid Whettnall	Netflix	

== April–June ==
⌀ Denotes a film that was publicly screened prior to 2024, be it through film festivals, premieres or releases in other countries
† Denotes a film released through a streaming service, not theatrically
‡ Denotes a film primarily not in the French language

Opening		English Title	Native Title	Director	Cast	Studio	Ref.
A P R I L	3	Agra ⌀‡	Agra	Kanu Behl	Mohit Agarwal, Priyanka Bose, Rahul Roy, Ruhani Sharma Vibha Chibber, Sonal Jha	Les Films de l'Atalante	
A P R I L	3	Dormitory ⌀‡	Yurt	Nehir Tuna	Doğa Karakaş, Can Bartu Aslan, Ozan Çelik, Tansu Biçer	Dulac Distribution	
A P R I L	3	Ducobu Goes Green!	Ducobu Passe au Vert	Élie Semoun	Damien Pauwels, Élie Semoun, Émilie Caen, Loïc Legendre, Frédérique Bel, François Levantal, Gérard Jugnot, Nicolas Marié, Caroline Anglade, Louise Riguidel Huon	UGC	
A P R I L	3	It's Raining in the House ⌀	Il Pleut dans la Maison	Paloma Sermon-Daï	Makenzy Lombet, Purdey Lombet, Donovan Nizet	Condor Entertainment	
A P R I L	3	Just a Couple of Days	Quelques Jours Pas Plus	Julie Navarro	Camille Cottin, Benjamin Biolay, Amrullah Safi, Hippolyte Girardot	BAC Films	
A P R I L	3	Maybe More	Et Plus Si Affinités	Olivier Ducray & Wilfried Méance	Isabelle Carré, Bernard Campan, Julia Faure, Pablo Pauly	Wild Bunch	
A P R I L	3	Sidonie in Japan ⌀	Sidonie au Japon	Élise Girard	Isabelle Huppert, Tsuyoshi Ihara, August Diehl	Art House Films	
A P R I L	3	Solitude ⌀‡	Einvera	Ninna Pálmadóttir	Þröstur Leó Gunnarsson, Hermann Samúelsson, Anna Gunndís Guðmundsdóttir	Jour2Fête	
A P R I L	10	Behind the Mountains ⌀‡	وراء الجبل	Mohamed Ben Attia	Majd Mastoura, Walid Bouchhioua, Samer Bisharat, Helmi Dridi	Kinovista	
A P R I L	10	Heartless ⌀‡	Sem Coração	Nara Normande & Tião	Maya de Vicq, Eduarda Samara, Maeve Jinkings, Erom Cordeiro	Les Valseurs	
A P R I L	10	Holy Week ‡	Săptămâna Mare	Andrei Cohn	Doru Bem, Nicoleta Lefter, Ciprian Chiricheş	Shellac Films	
A P R I L	10	Meet the Leroys	Nous, les Leroy	Florent Bernard	Charlotte Gainsbourg, José Garcia, Lily Aubry, Hadrien Heaulmé, Lyes Salem, Luis Rego	Apollo Films	
A P R I L	10	Réconciliation, dans les Pas des Cathares	Réconciliation, dans les Pas des Cathares	Freddy Mouchard	Freddy Mouchard, Franck Thézan, Martine Gautier	Betel Films	
A P R I L	10	Rosalie ⌀	Rosalie	Stéphanie Di Giusto	Nadia Tereszkiewicz, Benoît Magimel, Benjamin Biolay, Guillaume Gouix, Gustave Kervern	Gaumont	
A P R I L	10	Through the Night ⌀	Quitter la Nuit	Delphine Girard	Selma Alaoui, Veerle Baetens, Guillaume Duhesme, Anne Dorval, Guillaume Tranchant	Haut et Court	
A P R I L	17	Borgo ‡	Borgo	Stéphane Demoustier	Hafsia Herzi, Moussa Mansaly, Louis Memmi, Michel Fau, Pablo Pauly, Florence Loiret Caille	Le Pacte	
A P R I L	17	Here & There	Ici et Là-bas	Ludovic Bernard	Ahmed Sylla, Hakim Jemili, Hugo Becker, Annelise Hesme, Eriq Ebouaney	StudioCanal	
A P R I L	17	L'Île	L'Île	Damien Manivel	Olga Milshtein, Rosa Berder	La Traverse	
A P R I L	17	LaRoy, Texas ⌀‡	LaRoy, Texas	Shane Atkinson	Steve Zahn, Jared Harris, John Magaro, Matthew Del Negro, Dylan Baker	ARP Sélection	
A P R I L	17	Orso ⌀	Orso	Bruno Mercier	Anthony Moudir, Juliette Dutent	Les Mûres Sauvages	
A P R I L	24	Birdland ⌀‡	شيوع	Leïla Kilani	Ifham Mathet, Mustafa Shimdat, Bahia Boutia El Oumani	DKB Productions	
A P R I L	24	Brothers	Frères	Olivier Casas	Yvan Attal, Mathieu Kassovitz, Alma Jodorowsky	Zinc Film	
A P R I L	24	Citadel	Citadel	Bruno Mercier	Maud Imbert, Mark Austin	Les Mûres Sauvages	
A P R I L	24	City of Wind ⌀‡	Сэр Сэр Салхи	Lkhagvadulam Purev-Ochir	Tergel Bold-Erdene, Nomin-Erdene Ariunbyamba, Bulgan Chuluunbat	Arizona Distribution	
A P R I L	24	Drift ⌀‡	Drift	Anthony Chen	Cynthia Erivo, Alia Shawkat, Honor Swinton Byrne, Zainab Jah	Epicentre Films	
A P R I L	24	First Case ⌀	Première Affaire	Victoria Musiedlak	Noée Abita, Anders Danielsen Lie, Alexis Neises, François Morel, Louise Chevillotte, Chad Chenouga	Tandem Films	
A P R I L	24	Phantom Youth ⌀‡	Bota Jonë	Luàna Bajrami	Albina Krasniqi, Elsa Mala, Aurora Ferati	Gaumont	
A P R I L	24	Que Notre Joie Demeure	Que Notre Joie Demeure	Cheyenne Carron	Daniel Berlioux, Oussem Kadri, Gérard Chaillou	Hésiode	
A P R I L	24	Riviera Revenge	N'Avoue Jamais	Ivan Calbérac	André Dussollier, Sabine Azéma, Thierry Lhermitte, Joséphine de Meaux, Sébastien Chassagne, Michel Boujenah	Wild Bunch	
A P R I L	24	The Soul Eater	Le Mangeur d'Âmes	Julien Maury and Alexandre Bustillo	Virginie Ledoyen, Paul Hamy, Sandrine Bonnaire, Francis Renaud, Malik Zidi, Chloé Coulloud, Elisabeth Duda	Star Invest Films	
A P R I L	24	The Unicorn's Bleat	Le Brame de la Licorne	Arnaud Romet	Julien Charrier, Diane Launay, Romain Blanchard	Ecransud Distribution	
M A Y	1	A Little Something Extra	Un P'tit Truc en Plus	Artus	Artus, Clovis Cornillac, Alice Belaïdi	Pan-Européenne	
M A Y	1	Auction	Le Tableau Volé	Pascal Bonitzer	Alex Lutz, Léa Drucker, Nora Hamzawi, Louise Chevillotte, Arcadi Radeff, Laurence Côte, Alain Chamfort, Olivier Rabourdin, Marisa Borini	Pyramide Films	
M A Y	1	Sibel's Silence	Le Silence de Sibel	Aly Yeganeh	Laëtitia Eïdo, Mélissa Boros, Rusen Houssin	À Vif Cinémas	
M A Y	1	Smoke Signals	Une Affaire de Principe	Antoine Raimbault	Bouli Lanners, Thomas VDB, Céleste Brunnquell, Lisa Loven Kongsli, Lisa Karlström, Maurizio Marchetti, Klaus Christian Schreiber, Wim Willaert, Joaquim de Almeida, Vincenzo Amato, Bernard Blancan, Nicolas Vaude, Béatrice de Staël, Maria de Medeiros, Eric Soriano	Memento Distribution	
M A Y	1	Striking the Palace	Petites Mains	Nessim Chikhaoui	Corinne Masiero, Lucie Charles-Alfred, Marie-Sohna Condé, Salimata Kamaté, Maïmouna Gueye, Kool Shen, Abdallah Charki, Mariama Gueye, Fatima Adoum	Le Pacte	
M A Y	8	Chasing Johnny	Un Homme en Fuite	Baptiste Debraux	Bastien Bouillon, Léa Drucker, Pierre Lottin, Marion Barbeau, Anne Consigny, Wim Willaert, Eric Godon, Zoé Bruneau	Tandem Films	
M A Y	8	Game Changers	L'Esprit Coubertin	Jérémie Sein	Benjamin Voisin, Emmanuelle Bercot, Rivaldo Pawawi, Grégoire Ludig, Laura Felpin, Suzy Bemba, Aure Atika	BAC Films	
M A Y	8	Girl for a Day	Un Jour Fille	Jean-Claude Monod	Marie Toscan, Iris Bry, Thomas Scimeca, Thibault de Montalembert, Sarah Le Picard, François Berléand, André Marcon, Yannick Renier, Isild Le Besco	KapFilms	
M A Y	8	Jeunesse, Mon Amour	Jeunesse, Mon Amour	Léo Fontaine	Manon Bresch, Matthieu Lucci, Dimitri Decaux	Wayna Pitch	
M A Y	8	La Couleur dans les Mains	La Couleur dans les Mains	Nora Hamdi	Kenza Moumou, Marin Fabre, Mohammed Benazza	B&Films	
M A Y	8	Neuilly-Poissy	Neuilly-Poissy	Grégory Boutboul	Max Boublil, Mélanie Bernier, Claudia Tagbo, Steve Tientcheu, Gérard Darmon, Gérard Jugnot, Anne Charrier, Clotilde Courau	Paradis Films	
M A Y	8	Wake Up ⌀‡	Wake Up	Yoann-Karl Whissell, François Simard and Anouk Whissell	Turlough Convery, Benny O. Arthur, Jacqueline Moré, Charlotte Stoiber	Alba Films	
M A Y	14	The Second Act (Note: Opened in the evening, concurrently with its premiere at the Cannes Film Festival)	Le Deuxième Acte	Quentin Dupieux	Léa Seydoux, Vincent Lindon, Louis Garrel, Raphaël Quenard	Diaphana Distribution	
M A Y	15	Bitten ⌀	La Morsure	Romain de Saint-Blanquat	Léonie Dahan-Lamort, Lilith Grasmug, Fred Blin	KMBO Films	
M A Y	15	Hood Witch ⌀	Roqya	Saïd Belktibia	Golshifteh Farahani, Jérémy Ferrari, Denis Lavant, Issaka Sawadogo	The Jokers Films	
M A Y	15	Queens ⌀‡	ملكات	Yasmine Benkiran	Nisrin Erradi, Nisrine Benchara, Rayhan Guaran	Moonlight Films Distribution	
M A Y	15	The Fantastic Three ⌀	Les Trois Fantastiques	Michaël Dichter	Diego Murgia, Emmanuelle Bercot, Raphaël Quenard	Zinc Film	
M A Y	15	The Palace ⌀‡	The Palace	Roman Polanski	Oliver Masucci, Fanny Ardant, John Cleese, Joaquim de Almeida, Luca Barbareschi, Milan Peschel, Bronwyn James, Fortunato Cerlino, Mickey Rourke, Alexander Petrov, Ilia Volok, Morgane Polanski, Sydne Rome	Swashbuckler Films	
M A Y	21	Marcello Mio (Note: Opened in the evening, concurrently with its premiere at the Cannes Film Festival)	Marcello Mio	Christophe Honoré	Chiara Mastroianni, Catherine Deneuve, Fabrice Luchini, Nicole Garcia, Benjamin Biolay, Melvil Poupaud, Hugh Skinner, Stefania Sandrelli	Ad Vitam Distribution	
M A Y	22	Colocs de Choc	Colocs de Choc	Élodie Lélu	Olivier Gourmet, Hélène Vincent, Fantine Harduin, Émilie Dequenne	Daisy Day Films	
M A Y	22	Irati ⌀‡	Irati	Paul Urkijo Alijo	Eneko Sagardoy, Edurne Azkarate, Itziar Ituño	La Fidèle	
M A Y	29	Anhell69 ⌀‡	Anhell69	Theo Montoya	Alejandro Hincapié, Camilo Machado, Alejandro Mendigana	Dublin Films	
M A Y	29	Assemblage ‡	Assemblage	Sofiene Mamdi	Luke Stratte-McClure, Julien Romano, Catalina Cuevas	Reaficta Films	
M A Y	29	Lazy Girls	Fainéant.e.s	Karim Dridi	Faddo Jullian, Odette Simonneau, Lucas Viudez	New Story Films	
M A Y	29	L'Ennemi Public n°0	L'Ennemi Public n°0	Amalric Gérard	Danièle Évenou, Aurélie Vaneck, Jean-François Malet, Patrick Adler, Pierre Bellemare, Sotele Puleoto, Romain Bouteille	OpéRett	
M A Y	29	Salem ⌀	Salem	Jean-Bernard Marlin	Oumar Moindjie, Dalil Abdourahim, Wallen El Gharbaoui	Ad Vitam Distribution	
M A Y	31	Kali †	Kali	Julien Seri	Sabrina Ouazani, Olivia Côte, Philippe Bas	Amazon Prime Video	
J U N E	5	For Night Will Come	En Attendant la Nuit	Céline Rouzet	Mathias Legoût Hammond, Élodie Bouchez, Jean-Charles Clichet, Céleste Brunnquell	Tandem Films	
J U N E	5	La Gardav	La Gardav	Thomas & Dimitri Lemoine	Thomas Lemoine, Gaël Tavares, Pierre Lottin, Lionnel Astier	Wayna Pitch	
J U N E	5	Love Boat	La Petite Vadrouille	Bruno Podalydès	Sandrine Kiberlain, Daniel Auteuil, Denis Podalydès, Bruno Podalydès, Florence Muller, Isabelle Candelier, Yann Frisch	UGC	
J U N E	5	Meeting with Pol Pot	Rendez-vous avec Pol Pot	Rithy Panh	Irène Jacob, Grégoire Colin, Cyril Gueï	Dulac Distribution	
J U N E	5	Temporaries ⌀	Richelieu	Pier-Philippe Chevigny	Ariane Castellanos, Marc-André Grondin, Nelson Coronado, Marvin Coroy, María Mercedes Coroy, Luis Oliva, Micheline Bernard, Émile Schneider, Christine Beaulieu	Les Alchimistes	
J U N E	5	Under Paris †	Sous la Seine	Xavier Gens	Bérénice Bejo, Nassim Lyes, Anne Marivin, Aurélia Petit	Netflix	
J U N E	12	Dear Paris	Paradis Paris	Marjane Satrapi	Monica Bellucci, Ben Aldridge, Rossy de Palma, Martina García, Eduardo Noriega, André Dussollier, Alex Lutz, Roschdy Zem, Charlotte Dauphin	StudioCanal	
J U N E	12	It's Not Me	C'est Pas Moi	Leos Carax	Denis Lavant, Kateryna Yuspina, Nastya Golubeva Carax	Les Films du Losange	
J U N E	12	Juliette in Spring	Juliette au Printemps	Blandine Lenoir	Izïa Higelin, Sophie Guillemin, Jean-Pierre Darroussin, Noémie Lvovsky, Éric Caravaca, Thomas de Pourquery, Liliane Rovère	Diaphana Distribution	
J U N E	19	Being Maria	Maria	Jessica Palud	Anamaria Vartolomei, Yvan Attal, Matt Dillon, Marie Gillain, Stanislas Merhar, Céleste Brunnquell	Haut et Court	
J U N E	19	Her and Him and the Rest of the World	Elle & Lui et le Reste du Monde	Emmanuelle Belohradsky	Victor Belmondo, Galatea Bellugi, Frédéric Maranber	Wild Bunch	
J U N E	19	Mon Milieu	Mon Milieu	Milo Chiarini	Milo Chiarini, Nicolas Morazzani, Sabrina Nouchi	KapFilms	
J U N E	19	Natura ⌀	Natura	Mickael Perret	Manya Muse, Serge Réquet-Barville, Chris Zastera	Saint-André-des-Arts	
J U N E	19	Nouveau Monde	Nouveau Monde	Vincent Cappello	Rohid Rahimi, Sandor Funtek, Iris Bry, Sébastien Lalanne	120 Prods	
J U N E	19	Six Feet Over ⌀	Six Pieds sur Terre	Karim Bensalah	Hamza Meziani, Kader Affak, Karina Testa	Jour2Fête	
J U N E	19	Survive ‡	Survivre	Frédéric Jardin	Émilie Dequenne, Andreas Pietschmann	KMBO Films	
J U N E	19	Suspended Time	Hors du Temps	Olivier Assayas	Vincent Macaigne, Micha Lescot, Nora Hamzawi, Maud Wyler, Dominique Reymond	Ad Vitam Distribution	
J U N E	20	Les Infaillibles †	Les Infaillibles	Frédéric Forestier	Kévin Debonne, Inès Reg, Vincent Rottiers, Moussa Maaskri, Kévin Azaïs, Philippe Résimont, Lionnel Astier	Amazon Prime Video	
J U N E	26	Camping du Lac	Camping du Lac	Eléonore Saintagnan	Eléonore Saintagnan, Anna Turluc'h, Jean-Benoît Ugeux	Norte Distribution	
J U N E	26	Edouard and Charles ⌀	Vas-tu Renoncer?	Pascale Bodet	Benjamin Esdraffo, Pierre Léon, Serge Bozon, Marc Barbé, Marianne Basler, Andy Gillet	The Dark Films	
J U N E	26	Give a Little Beat	La Famille Hennedricks	Laurence Arné	Laurence Arné, Dany Boon, Ferdinand Redouloux, Jehan Renard	Gaumont	
J U N E	26	Plastic Guns	Les Pistolets en Plastique	Jean-Christophe Meurisse	Delphine Baril, Laurent Stocker, Charlotte Laemmel, Jonathan Cohen, Juana Acosta, Philippe Rebbot, Nora Hamzawi, François Rollin, Romane Bohringer	BAC Films	
J U N E	26	The Child Who Measured the World	L'Enfant Qui Mesurait le Monde	Takis Candilis	Bernard Campan, Raphael Brottier, Fotinì Peluso	Dulac Distribution	
J U N E	26	The Monk and the Gun ⌀‡	দ্য মঙ্ক অ্যান্ড দ্য গান	Pawo Choyning Dorji	Tandin Wangchuk, Deki Lhamo, Pema Zangmo Sherpa	Pyramide Films	
J U N E	28	The Count of Monte Cristo	Le Comte de Monte Cristo	Matthieu Delaporte & Alexandre de La Patellière	Pierre Niney, Bastien Bouillon, Anaïs Demoustier, Anamaria Vartolomei, Laurent Lafitte, Pierfrancesco Favino, Patrick Mille, Vassili Schneider, Julien de Saint Jean	Pathé	

== July–September ==
⌀ Denotes a film that was publicly screened prior to 2024, be it through film festivals, premieres or releases in other countries
† Denotes a film released through a streaming service, not theatrically
‡ Denotes a film primarily not in the French language

Opening		English Title	Native Title	Director	Cast	Studio	Ref.
J U L Y	3	A Smile Doesn't Lie	Pourquoi Tu Souris?	Christine Paillard & Chad Chenouga	Jean-Pascal Zadi, Raphaël Quenard, Emmanuelle Devos, Judith Magre	Ad Vitam Distribution	
J U L Y	3	Elyas	Elyas	Florent-Emilio Siri	Roschdy Zem, Laëtitia Eïdo, Jeanne Michel, Dimitri Storoge	StudioCanal	
J U L Y	3	Ghost Trail ‡	Les Fantômes	Jonathan Millet	Adam Bessa, Tawfeek Barhom, Julia Franz Richter	Memento Distribution	
J U L Y	3	Meanwhile on Earth	Pendant Ce Temps sur Terre	Jérémy Clapin	Megan Northam, Catherine Salée, Sofia Lesaffre, Sam Louwyck	Diaphana Distribution	
J U L Y	3	Zak & Wowo: La Légende de Lendarys	Zak & Wowo: La Légende de Lendarys	Philippe Duchêne & Jean-Baptiste Cuvelier	Clara Luciani, Manu Payet, Jérôme Niel, Kyan Khojandi	Sirius Media	
J U L Y	10	Eternal Playground	La Récréation de Juillet	Pablo Cotten & Joseph Rozé	Andranic Manet, Alassane Diong, Carla Audebaud, Alba Gaïa Bellugi, Arcadi Radeff, Nina Zem, Noée Abita	Wayna Pitch	
J U L Y	10	My New Friends	Les Gens d'à Côté	André Téchiné	Isabelle Huppert, Hafsia Herzi, Nahuel Pérez Biscayart	Jour2Fête	
J U L Y	10	The Medium ⌀	Le Médium	Emmanuel Laskar	Emmanuel Laskar, Louise Bourgoin, Maud Wyler, Noémie Lvovsky, Alexandre Steiger	Ad Vitam Distribution	
J U L Y	17	Almost Legal	Presque Légal	Max Mauroux	Marley Duboscq, Marie-Anne Chazel, François Levantal, Jérôme Niel, Olivier Marchal, Jean-Claude Muaka	Gaumont	
J U L Y	17	Eat the Night	Eat the Night	Caroline Poggi and Jonathan Vinel	Théo Cholbi, Lila Gueneau, Erwan Kepoa Falé	Tandem Films	
J U L Y	17	Foremost by Night ⌀‡	Sobre todo de noche	Víctor Iriarte	Lola Dueñas, Manuel Egozkue, Ana Torrent, María Vázquez	Shellac Films	
J U L Y	17	Karmapolice	Karmapolice	Julien Paolini	Syrus Shahidi, Alexis Manenti, Karidja Touré, Foëd Amara, Steve Tientcheu, Sabrina Ouazani, Thomas Blumenthal, Yaniss Lespert, Astan Bathily, Zacharie Chasseriaud	À Vif Cinémas	
J U L Y	17	King of My Castle	Le Larbin	Alexandre Charlot & Franck Magnier	Audran Cattin, Kad Merad, Clovis Cornillac, Isabelle Carré, Lionel Abelanski	SND	
J U L Y	17	Santosh ‡	Santosh	Sandhya Suri	Shahana Goswami, Sanjay Bishnoi, Kushal Dubey	Haut et Court	
J U L Y	24	Belle Enfant	Belle Enfant	Jim	Baptiste Lecaplain, Marine Bohin, Marisa Berenson, Albert Delpy, Michaël Cohen	Octopolis	
J U L Y	24	My Wonderful Stranger ‡	Min Fantastiske Fremmede	Johanna Pyykkö	Camilla Godø Krohn, Radoslav Vladimirov, Maya Amina Moustache Thuv	Pyramide Films	
J U L Y	31	Highway 65 ⌀‡	Highway 65	Maya Dreifuss	Tali Sharon, Idan Amedi, Igal Naor	Dean Medias	
J U L Y	31	The Price of Money: A Largo Winch Adventure	Largo Winch: Le Prix de l'Argent	Olivier Masset-Depasse	Tomer Sisley, James Franco, Clotilde Hesme, Élise Tilloloy, Koen De Bouw, Sonia Vachon	Pan-Européenne	
J U L Y	31	We Are Zombies ⌀	We Are Zombies	Yoann-Karl Whissell, François Simard and Anouk Whissell	Alexandre Nachi, Derek Johns, Megan Peta Hill, Vincent Leclerc	Destiny Films	
J U L Y	31	Who by Fire	Comme le Feu	Philippe Lesage	Noah Parker, Aurélia Arandi-Longpré, Arieh Worthalter, Paul Ahmarani, Sophie Desmarais, Irène Jacob, Laurent Lucas	Shellac Films	
A U G U S T	7	Carnal Sins ⌀‡	Almamula	Juan Sebastián Torales	Nicolás Díaz, Martina Grimaldi, Maria Soldi	Outplay	
A U G U S T	7	Day of the Tiger ⌀‡	Tigrú	Andrei Tănase	Cătălina Moga, Paul Ipate, Alex Velea	Condor Entertainment	
A U G U S T	7	Panda Bear in Africa ‡	Panda Bear in Africa	Richard Claus & Karsten Kiilerich	Yootha Wong-Loi-Sing, Maurits Delchot, Namisa Mdalose, Georgina Verbaan	Le Pacte	
A U G U S T	7	The Magic Book	Super Papa	Léa Lando	Ahmed Sylla, Claudia Tagbo, Julien Pestel, Louise Coldefy, Zabou Breitman	SND	
A U G U S T	14	Jim's Story	Le Roman de Jim	Arnaud and Jean-Marie Larrieu	Karim Leklou, Laetitia Dosch, Sara Giraudeau, Noée Abita	Pyramide Films	
A U G U S T	21	Fly On ⌀‡	ほつれる	Takuya Katō	Mugi Kadowaki, Tamura Kentaro, Shota Sometani, Haru Kuroki, Kanji Furutachi	Art House Films	
A U G U S T	21	Ghost Cat Anzu ‡	化け猫あんずちゃん	Yoko Kuno & Nobuhiro Yamashita	Mirai Moriyama, Keiichi Suzuki, Munetaka Aoki	Diaphana Distribution	
A U G U S T	21	Girls Will Be Girls ‡	Girls Will Be Girls	Shuchi Talati	Preeti Panigrahi, Kani Kusruti, Kesav Binoy Kiron	Nour Films	
A U G U S T	21	Mémé dans les Orties	Mémé dans les Orties	Aram Hékinian	Ginny Baker Hékinian, Britany Hart, Margaux Wicart	Kick a Farce Films	
A U G U S T	21	Nice Girls †	Nice Girls	Noémie Saglio	Alice Taglioni, Stéfi Celma, Baptiste Lecaplain, Benjamin Baroche, Noémie Lvovsky, Antoine Duléry	Netflix	
A U G U S T	21	Sujo ‡	Sujo	Fernanda Valadez & Astrid Rondero	Juan Jesús Varela, Yadira Pérez, Alexis Varela	Damned Distribution	
A U G U S T	21	Visiting Hours	La Prisonnière de Bordeaux	Patricia Mazuy	Isabelle Huppert, Hafsia Herzi, Magne-Håvard Brekke	Les Films du Losange	
A U G U S T	21	Zenithal	Zénithal	Jean-Baptiste Saurel	Vanessa Guide, Franc Bruneau, Cyril Gueï, Xavier Lacaille	The Jokers Films	
A U G U S T	28	Emilia Pérez ‡	Emilia Pérez	Jacques Audiard	Zoe Saldaña, Karla Sofía Gascón, Selena Gomez, Édgar Ramírez	Pathé	
A U G U S T	28	Happiness Therapy	Fêlés	Christophe Duthuron	Charlotte De Turckheim, Bernard Le Coq, Pierre Richard, Méliane Marcaggi, François Berléand, Émilie Caen	Pan-Européenne	
A U G U S T	28	Night Call	La Nuit Se Traine	Michiel Blanchart	Romain Duris, Jonas Bloquet, Natacha Krief, Thomas Mustin, Sam Louwyck	Gaumont	
A U G U S T	28	Push It to the Limit	Push It to the Limit	Sabrina Nouchi	Vittoria Baiocco, Sabrina Nouchi, Milo Chiarini	KapFilms	
A U G U S T	28	The Other Way Around ‡	Volveréis	Jonás Trueba	Itsaso Arana, Vito Sanz, Fernando Trueba	Arizona Distribution	
S E P T E M B E R	4	À l'Ancienne	À l'Ancienne	Hervé Mimran	Gérard Darmon, Didier Bourdon, Chantal Lauby, Paloma Coquant	StudioCanal	
S E P T E M B E R	4	Ce Qui Se Voit et Ce Qui Ne Se Voit Pas	Ce Qui Se Voit et Ce Qui Ne Se Voit Pas	Laurent Firode	Irène Ismaïloff, Agathe de La Boulaye	Bon Voyage Films	
S E P T E M B E R	4	In His Own Image	À Son Image	Thierry de Peretti	Clara-Maria Laredo, Marc-Antonu Mozziconacci, Louis Starace, Alexis Manenti	Pyramide Films	
S E P T E M B E R	4	Mi Bestia ‡	Mi Bestia	Camila Beltrán	Stella Martínez, Mallerly Murillo, Hector Sánchez, Marcela Mar	New Story Films	
S E P T E M B E R	4	Somewhere in Love	Une Vie Rêvée	Morgan Simon	Valeria Bruni Tedeschi, Félix Lefebvre, Lubna Azabal	Wild Bunch	
S E P T E M B E R	11	An Ordinary Case	Le Fil	Daniel Auteuil	Grégory Gadebois, Daniel Auteuil, Sidse Babett Knudsen, Alice Belaïdi, Gaëtan Roussel, Isabelle Candelier, Suliane Brahim, Aurore Auteuil	Zinc Film	
S E P T E M B E R	11	Dahomey	Dahomey	Mati Diop		Les Films du Losange	
S E P T E M B E R	11	Dog on Trial	Le Procès du Chien	Laetitia Dosch	Laetitia Dosch, François Damiens, Jean-Pascal Zadi, Anne Dorval, Mathieu Demy, Pierre Deladonchamps	The Jokers Films	
S E P T E M B E R	11	Langue Étrangère	Langue Étrangère	Claire Burger	Lilith Grasmug, Josefa Heinsius, Chiara Mastroianni, Nina Hoss	Les Films de Pierre	
S E P T E M B E R	11	The Darwinners	Silex and the City: Le Film	Jul & Jean-Paul Guigue	Frédéric Beigbeder, Stéphane Bern, Lison Daniel, Léa Drucker, Julie Gayet, Guillaume Gallienne, François Hollande, Agnès Hurstel, Ophélia Kolb, Noémie de Lattre, Amélie Nothomb, Océan, Raphaël Quenard, Léa Salamé, Clément Sibony, Bruno Solo, Augustin Trapenard, Alex Vizorek	Haut et Court	
S E P T E M B E R	18	Jour de Colère	Jour de Colère	Jean Luc Herbulot	JoeyStarr, Asia Argento, Michele Riondino, Joaquim Fossi, Michaël Abiteboul	KMBO Films	
S E P T E M B E R	18	Meet the Barbarians	Les Barbares	Julie Delpy	Julie Delpy, Sandrine Kiberlain, Laurent Lafitte, India Hair	Le Pacte	
S E P T E M B E R	18	No Chains No Masters	Ni Chaînes Ni Maîtres	Simon Moutaïrou	Ibrahima Mbaye, Camille Cottin, Anna Diakhere Thiandoum, Benoît Magimel, Félix Lefebvre	StudioCanal	
S E P T E M B E R	18	The Seed of the Sacred Fig ‡	دانه‌ی انجیر معابد	Mohammad Rasoulof	Missagh Zareh, Soheila Golestani, Setareh Maleki	Pyramide Films	
S E P T E M B E R	18	This Life of Mine	Ma Vie, Ma Gueule	Sophie Fillières	Agnès Jaoui, Philippe Katerine, Valérie Donzelli, Edouard Sulpice, Laurent Capelluto, Isabelle Candelier	Jour2Fête	
S E P T E M B E R	18	Viet and Nam ‡	Trong Lòng Đất	Minh Quý Trương	Phạm Thanh Hải, Đào Duy Bảo Định, Nguyễn Thị Nga	Nour Films	
S E P T E M B E R	25	Emmanuelle ‡	Emmanuelle	Audrey Diwan	Noémie Merlant, Naomi Watts, Will Sharpe, Jamie Campbell Bower, Chacha Huang, Anthony Wong	Pathé	
S E P T E M B E R	25	Pimp My Bride	L'Heureuse Élue	Frank Bellocq	Camille Lellouche, Gérard Darmon, Lionel Erdogan, Michèle Laroque	SND	
S E P T E M B E R	25	To Live, to Die, to Live Again	Vivre, Mourir, Renaître	Gaël Morel	Victor Belmondo, Lou Lampros, Théo Christine, Amanda Lear, Elli Medeiros, Stéphane Rideau	ARP Sélection	
S E P T E M B E R	25	Weekend in Taipei ‡	Weekend in Taipei	George Huang	Luke Evans, Gwei Lun-mei, Sung Kang	Apollo Films	

== October–December ==
† Denotes a film released through a streaming service, not theatrically
‡ Denotes a film primarily not in the French language

Opening		English Title	Native Title	Director	Cast	Studio	Ref.
O C T O B E R	2	All We Imagine as Light ‡	All We Imagine as Light	Payal Kapadia	Kani Kusruti, Divya Prabha, Chhaya Kadam, Azees Nedumangad	Condor Entertainment	
O C T O B E R	2	Drone	Drone	Simon Bouisson	Marion Barbeau, Stefan Crepon, Eugénie Derouand, Cédric Kahn	Haut et Court	
O C T O B E R	2	Maya, Donne-moi un Titre	Maya, Donne-moi un Titre	Michel Gondry	Pierre Niney, Maya Gondry	The Jokers Films	
O C T O B E R	2	Start Me Up	On Fait Quoi Maintenant?	Lucien Jean-Baptiste	Isabelle Nanty, Gérard Darmon, Lucien Jean-Baptiste, Zabou Breitman	Apollo Films	
O C T O B E R	2	The Bearded Mermaid	La Sirène à Barbe	Nicolas Bellenchombre & Arthur Delamotte	Maxime Sartori, Fabrice Morio, Alonso Ojeda	Beluga Distribution	
O C T O B E R	2	When Fall Is Coming	Quand Vient l'Automne	François Ozon	Hélène Vincent, Josiane Balasko, Ludivine Sagnier, Pierre Lottin, Sophie Guillemin, Paul Beaurepaire	Diaphana Distribution	
O C T O B E R	9	La Damnée	La Damnée	Abel Danan	Lina El Arabi, Ouidad Elma	Star Invest Films	
O C T O B E R	9	Niki	Niki	Céline Sallette	Charlotte Le Bon, Damien Bonnard, Judith Chemla, John Robinson, Radu Mihăileanu	Wild Bunch	
O C T O B E R	16	Bambi, L'Histoire d'une Vie dans les Bois	Bambi, L'Histoire d'une Vie dans les Bois	Michel Fessler		Gebeka Films	
O C T O B E R	16	Beating Hearts	L'Amour Ouf	Gilles Lellouche	François Civil, Adèle Exarchopoulos, Mallory Wanecque, Alain Chabat, Vincent Lacoste, Jean-Pascal Zadi, Élodie Bouchez, Karim Leklou, Raphaël Quenard, Anthony Bajon	StudioCanal	
O C T O B E R	16	Crossing ‡	Geçiş	Levan Akin	Mzia Arabuli, Lucas Kankava, Deniz Dumanlı	New Story Films	
O C T O B E R	16	Little Algérie	Barbès, Little Algérie	Hassan Guerrar	Sofiane Zermani, Eye Haïdara, Clotilde Courau, Adila Bendimerad	Jour2Fête	
O C T O B E R	16	Misericordia	Miséricorde	Alain Guiraudie	Félix Kysyl, Catherine Frot, Jacques Develay, Jean-Baptiste Durand	Les Films du Losange	
O C T O B E R	16	The World Upside Down	C'est le Monde à l'Envers!	Nicolas Vanier	Michaël Youn, Barbara Schulz, Valérie Bonneton, François Berléand, Maïra Schmitt, Nathan Gruffy, Éric Elmosnino, Yannick Noah	Gaumont	
O C T O B E R	16	You're Not the One I Expected	Sauvages	Claude Barras	Martin Verset, Laetitia Dosch, Benoît Poelvoorde, Michel Vuillermoz	Haut et Court	
O C T O B E R	23	Family Pack †	Loups-Garous	François Uzan	Franck Dubosc, Jean Reno, Jonathan Lambert, Suzanne Clément, Grégory Fitoussi, David Salles	Netflix	
O C T O B E R	23	Fario	Fario	Lucie Prost	Finnegan Oldfield, Florence Loiret Caille, Megan Northam, Olivia Côte	Paname Distribution	
O C T O B E R	23	Into the Wonderwoods	Angelo dans la Forêt Mystérieuse	Vincent Paronnaud & Alexis Ducord	Philippe Katerine, José Garcia, Yolande Moreau	Le Pacte	
O C T O B E R	23	Lucky Punch	Challenger	Varante Soudjian	Alban Ivanov, Audrey Pirault, Soso Maness, David Salles, Moussa Maaskri, Jonas Dinal, Pierre-François Martin-Laval	UGC	
O C T O B E R	23	Monsieur Aznavour	Monsieur Aznavour	Grand Corps Malade & Mehdi Idir	Tahar Rahim, Bastien Bouillon, Elisabeth Duda, Marie-Julie Baup	Pathé	
O C T O B E R	23	Shooting Stars 2	4 Zéros	Fabien Onteniente	Gérard Lanvin, Didier Bourdon, Isabelle Nanty, Kaaris, Stomy Bugsy, Tamara Marthe, Rolland Courbis, Didier Drogba, David Ginola, Karim Benzema, Paul Pogba, Presnel Kimpembe, Blaise Matuidi, Steve Mandanda, Fabrice Abriel, Éric Abidal, Guy Roux, Djimo	SND	
O C T O B E R	30	Flow	Flow	Gints Zilbalodis		UFO Distribution	
O C T O B E R	30	The Kingdom	Le Royaume	Julien Colonna	Ghjuvanna Benedetti, Saveriu Santucci, Anthony Morganti	Ad Vitam Distribution	
O C T O B E R	30	The Art of Nothing	L'Art d'Être Heureux	Stefan Liberski	Benoît Poelvoorde, Gustave Kervern, Camille Cottin	KMBO Films	
O C T O B E R	30	The Divine Sarah Bernhardt	Sarah Bernhardt, La Divine	Guillaume Nicloux	Sandrine Kiberlain, Laurent Lafitte, Amira Casar, Pauline Étienne, Laurent Stocker, Sébastien Pouderoux, Mathilde Ollivier, Grégoire Leprince-Ringuet, Clément Hervieu-Léger	BAC Films	
N O V E M B E R	1	Freedom †	Libre	Mélanie Laurent	Lucas Bravo, Léa Luce Busato, Lison Daniel, Yvan Attal, Radivoje Bukvić, Steve Tientcheu, David Murgia, Slimane Dazi	Amazon Prime Video	
N O V E M B E R	6	Animale	Animale	Emma Benestan	Oulaya Amamra, Damien Rebattel, Vivian Rodriguez	Wild Bunch	
N O V E M B E R	6	Miss Violet	Louise Violet	Éric Besnard	Alexandra Lamy, Grégory Gadebois, Jérôme Kircher, Jérémy Lopez, Patrick Pineau, Annie Mercier	Apollo Films	
N O V E M B E R	6	On the Edge	Sur un Fil	Reda Kateb	Aloïse Sauvage, Philippe Rebbot, Jean-Philippe Buzaud, Sara Giraudeau, Samir Guesmi	Universal Pictures	
N O V E M B E R	6	Trois Amies	Trois Amies	Emmanuel Mouret	Camille Cottin, Sara Forestier, India Hair, Damien Bonnard, Grégoire Ludig, Vincent Macaigne, Éric Caravaca	Pyramide Films	
N O V E M B E R	13	A Mother's Special Love	En Tongs au Pied de l'Himalaya	John Wax	Audrey Lamy, Nicolas Chupin, Benjamin Tranié, Naidra Ayadi, Steve Tientcheu, Jean-Pascal Zadi, Stéphan Wojtowicz, Tatiana Gousseff, Delphine Baril	Le Pacte	
N O V E M B E R	13	Finalement	Finalement	Claude Lelouch	Elsa Zylberstein, Kad Merad, Michel Boujenah, Sandrine Bonnaire, Barbara Pravi, Françoise Fabian, François Morel, Marianne Denicourt, Clémentine Célarié, Lionel Abelanski, Dominique Pinon, Julie Ferrier, Ibrahim Maalouf, Jean Dujardin, Marie-Hélène Lentini	Metropolitan Filmexport	
N O V E M B E R	13	La Vallée des Fous	La Vallée des Fous	Xavier Beauvois	Jean-Paul Rouve, Pierre Richard, Madeleine Beauvois, Joseph Olivennes	Pathé	
N O V E M B E R	13	On Aurait Dû Aller en Grèce	On Aurait Dû Aller en Grèce	Nicolas Benamou	Gérard Jugnot, Virginie Hocq, Élie Semoun, Orféo Campanella, Charlotte Gabris, Michel Ferracci, Vincent Desagnat, Pierre-Marie Mosconi	Moonlight Films Distribution	
N O V E M B E R	13	Une Part Manquante	Une Part Manquante	Guillaume Senez	Romain Duris, Mei Cirne-Masuki, Judith Chemla	Haut et Court	
N O V E M B E R	20	Call of Water	En Attendant la Nuit	Élise Otzenberger	Cécile de France, Arthur Igual	Tandem Films	
N O V E M B E R	20	Speak Out	Le Panache	Jennifer Devoldère	Aure Atika, José Garcia, Joachim Arseguel	SND	
N O V E M B E R	20	The Most Precious of Cargoes	La Plus Précieuse des Marchandises	Michel Hazanavicius	Jean-Louis Trintignant, Grégory Gadebois, Denis Podalydès, Dominique Blanc	StudioCanal	
N O V E M B E R	20	Wild Diamond	Diamant Brut	Agathe Riedinger	Malou Khebizi, Idir Azougli, Andréa Bescond, Alexis Manenti	Pyramide Films	
N O V E M B E R	27	À Toute Allure	À Toute Allure	Lucas Bernard	Pio Marmaï, Eye Haïdara, José Garcia	Gaumont	
N O V E M B E R	27	Grand Tour ‡	Grand Tour	Miguel Gomes	Crista Alfaiate, Gonçalo Waddington, Cláudio da Silva	Tandem Films	
N O V E M B E R	27	Les Boules de Noël	Les Boules de Noël	Alexandra Leclère	Valérie Bonneton, Kad Merad, Noémie Lvovsky, Louise Massin, Jackie Berroyer, Laurent Stocker, Macha Méril	Sony Pictures	
N O V E M B E R	27	Mercato	Mercato	Tristan Séguéla	Jamel Debbouze	Pathé	
N O V E M B E R	27	Prodigieuses	Prodigieuses	Frédéric & Valentin Potier	Camille Razat, Mélanie Robert, Franck Dubosc, Isabelle Carré, August Wittgenstein	Apollo Films	
N O V E M B E R	27	Rabia	Rabia	Mareike Engelhardt	Megan Northam, Lubna Azabal, Natacha Krief	Memento Distribution	
N O V E M B E R	27	The Marching Band	En Fanfare	Emmanuel Courcol	Benjamin Lavernhe, Pierre Lottin, Sarah Suco	Diaphana Distribution	
N O V E M B E R	27	The Story of Souleymane	L'Histoire de Souleymane	Boris Lojkine	Abou Sangare, Nina Meurisse, Alpha Oumar Sow	Pyramide Films	
D E C E M B E R	4	And Their Children After Them	Leurs Enfants Après Eux	Ludovic Boukherma & Zoran Boukherma	Gilles Lellouche, Paul Kircher, Anaïs Demoustier	Warner Bros. Pictures	
D E C E M B E R	11	Family Therapy	Jamais Sans Mon Psy	Arnaud Lemort	Rayane Bensetti, Claire Chust, Christian Clavier, Baptiste Lecaplain, Cristiana Reali	UGC	
D E C E M B E R	11	Holy Cow	Vingt Dieux	Louise Courvoisier	Clément Faveau, Luna Garret, Mathis Bertrand	Pyramide Films	
D E C E M B E R	11	Saint-Ex	Saint-Ex	Pablo Agüero	Louis Garrel, Vincent Cassel, Diane Kruger	StudioCanal	
D E C E M B E R	11	The Balconettes	Les Femmes au Balcon	Noémie Merlant	Noémie Merlant, Souheila Yacoub, Sanda Codreanu, Lucas Bravo, Nadège Beausson-Diagne	Tandem Films	
D E C E M B E R	18	Christmas Carole	Un Noël en Famille	Jeanne Gottesdiener	Noémie Lvovsky, Didier Bourdon, Alice Daubelcour, Jules Sagot, Janaïna Halloy-Fokan, Christophe Montenez, Marie Bunel, Renaud Rutten, Sissi Duparc	KMBO Films	
D E C E M B E R	18	Mads †	Mads	David Moreau	Lucille Guillaume, Laurie Pavy, Milton Riche, Yovel Lewkowski, Sasha Rudakova, Vincent Pasdermadjian	Shudder	
D E C E M B E R	18	Mon Inséparable	Mon Inséparable	Anne-Sophie Bailly	Laure Calamy, Charles Peccia-Galletto, Julie Froger, Geert Van Rampelberg, Pasquale d'Inca, Aïssatou Diallo Sagna	Les Films du Losange	
D E C E M B E R	18	Queens of Drama	Les Reines du Drame	Alexis Langlois	Louiza Aura, Gio Ventura, Asia Argento, Alma Jodorowsky, Bilal Hassani, Julia Fiquet	BAC Films	
D E C E M B E R	18	Sous Écrous	Sous Écrous	Hakim Bougheraba	Ichem Bougheraba, Arriles Amrani, Bernard Farcy, Redouane Bougheraba, Emma Smet	Apollo Films	
D E C E M B E R	18	When the Light Breaks ‡	Ljósbrot	Rúnar Rúnarsson	Elín Hall, Mikael Kaaber, Katla Njálsdóttir	Jour2Fête	
D E C E M B E R	25	Les Cadeaux	Les Cadeaux	Raphaële Moussafir & Christophe Offenstein	Chantal Lauby, Gérard Darmon, Camille Lellouche, Mélanie Doutey, Vanessa Guide, Gringe, Max Boublil, Tom Leeb, Liliane Rovère	Warner Bros. Pictures	
D E C E M B E R	25	Motel Destino ‡	Motel Destino	Karim Aïnouz	Iago Xavier, Nataly Rocha, Fábio Assunção	Tandem Films	
D E C E M B E R	25	My Sunshine ‡	ぼくのお日さま	Hiroshi Okuyama	Sosuke Ikematsu, Keitatsu Koshiyama, Kiara Nakanishi, Ryuya Wakaba, Yunho	Art House Films	
Planet B	25	Planète B	Aude-Léa Rapin	Adèle Exarchopoulos, Souheila Yacoub, Eliane Umuhire, India Hair, Paul Beaurepaire, Marc Barbé, Théo Cholbi, Thierry Hancisse	Le Pacte		

== TBA ==
† Denotes a film released through a streaming service, not theatrically
‡ Denotes a film primarily not in the French language

Opening	English Title	Native Title	Director	Cast	Studio	Ref.
T B A	GTMax †	GTMax	Olivier Schneider	Ava Baya, Jalil Lespert, Jérémie Laheurte, Gérard Lanvin, Clémentine Célarié	Netflix	
T B A	June and John ‡	June and John	Luc Besson	Luke Stanton Eddy, Matilda Price	Apollo Films	

== See also ==
- List of French films of 2023
- List of 2024 box office number-one films in France
