= Paul Belmondo =

Paul Belmondo may refer to:

- Paul Belmondo (sculptor) (1898–1982), French sculptor
- Jean-Paul Belmondo (1933–2021), French actor, producer and distributor, son of the above
- Paul Belmondo (racing driver) (born 1963), French racing driver and actor, son of the above
