= Haciendo amigos =

- Film poster
- Directed by: David Marqués
- Written by: Marta González de Vega
- Based on: A Little Something Extra by Artus, Milan Mauger and Clément Marchand
- Produced by: María Luisa Gutiérrez; Álvaro Ariza
- Starring: Antonio Resines; Quim Gutiérrez; Megan Montaner
- Cinematography: Chiqui Palma
- Edited by: Fran Amaro
- Music by: María Vértiz
- Production companies: Pequeñas grandes cosas AIE; Bowfinger International Pictures; Esto También Pasará; Glow; Studio 33
- Distributed by: Sony Pictures
- Release date: 10 July 2026 (Spain)
- Running time: 100 minutes
- Countries: Spain; Mexico
- Language: Spanish

Haciendo amigos (lit. 'making friends') is a 2026 comedy film directed by David Marqués and written by Marta González de Vega remaking the French film A Little Something Extra. It stars Antonio Resines and Quim Gutiérrez alongside Megan Montaner.

== Plot ==
Fleeing from a crime scene, petty criminals Antonio and Félix stump into a group of people with special needs, and the instructor Eva mistakes Félix for another person with special needs, so as they go along with Félix posing as a person with disabilities and Antonio as his caregiver, but they are subjected to constant blackmail. Meanwhile Antonio and Félix try to rekindle their father-son relationship.

== Cast ==
- Antonio Resines as Antonio
- Quim Gutiérrez as Félix
- Megan Montaner as Eva
- Carmen Lara Díaz
- Cristofer Ortiz
- Ignacio Gascón
- Israel Romero
- Juan Fernández
- Luis Sánchez
- Mario Navarro
- María Masián
- Mikel Rubia
- Pablo Márquez
- Raquel Cortés
- Ángel Cecilia
- Ana Mencía

== Production ==
Written by Marta González de Vega, the film is a remake of the 2024 French box-office hit A Little Something Extra. It was produced by Pequeñas Grandes cosas AIE, Bowfinger International Pictures, Esto También Pasará, and Glow, alongside Studio 33, with the association of Sony Pictures Entertainment Iberia and the participation of Amazon Prime Video and Atresmedia. Shooting locations in Fuerteventura included Puerto del Rosario, Pájara, and Oasis Wildlife Fuerteventura.

== Release ==
Distributed by Sony Pictures, the film was released theatrically in Spain on 10 July 2026.

== Reception ==
Raquel Hernández Luján of HobbyConsolas gave the film a 57-point rating, deeming it to be a "entertaining", but noting that it cannot help but resort to clichés.

Enid Román Almansa of Cinemanía rated the film 3 out of 5 stars, pointing out that it is one of those movies making you leave the theatre with a smile on your face.

Pablo Vázquez of Fotogramas rated the film 4 out of 5 stars, lauding how it strikes as complex and subtle balance navigating between the 'feel-good movie' genre and an almost libertarian hedonism.

Philipp Engel of La Vanguardia rated the film 2 out of 5 stars, summing it ut as "a sentimental, neo-stale, and supposedly inclusive comedy for children of all ages".

== See also ==
- List of Spanish films of 2026
