= Masterplan (film) =

2026 heist film

- Directed by: Thomas Vincent
- Screenplay by: David Wolstencroft; Thomas Vincent
- Starring: Stanley Tucci; Victor Belmondo; Simona Tabasco
- Cinematography: Matteo Cocco
- Edited by: Audrey Simonaud
- Music by: Polérik Rouvière
- Production companies: Amazon MGM Studios; Gaumont
- Distributed by: Amazon Prime Video
- Release date: 16 October 2026
- Countries: France; Italy

Masterplan is a 2026 French-Italian heist film co-written and directed by Thomas Vincent. It stars Stanley Tucci, Victor Belmondo and Simona Tabasco.

It was released via Amazon Prime Video on 16 October 2026.

== Cast ==
- Stanley Tucci as Roger
- Victor Belmondo as Jay
- Simona Tabasco as Chiara
- Mark Ivanir as Bruno
- Philippe Uchan as Bartoli
- Foëd Amara as Mo
- Elisabeth Vitali as Jay's mother
- Jonas Bachan as Benjy

== Reception ==
On the review aggregator website Rotten Tomatoes, 31% of 13 critics' reviews are positive. Metacritic, which uses a weighted average, assigned the film a score of 48 out of 100, based on 4 critics, indicating "mixed or average reviews".
