= Sweetheart (2019 French film) =

2019 French comedy drama film

- Directed by: Lisa Azuelos
- Starring: Sandrine Kiberlain; Thaïs Alessandrin
- Release date: 16 January 2019
- Running time: 1h 27min
- Country: France
- Language: French
- Budget: $7.5 million
- Box office: $4.7 million

Sweetheart (French: Mon bébé) is a 2019 French comedy-drama film directed by Lisa Azuelos.

== Cast ==
- Sandrine Kiberlain as Héloïse
- Thaïs Alessandrin as Jade
- Victor Belmondo as Théo
- Mickaël Lumière as Louis
- Camille Claris as Lola
- Kyan Khojandi as Paul
- Arnaud Valois as Mehdi
- Patrick Chesnais as Jules
- Yvan Attal as Franck
