= Fred Cavayé =

French film director and screenwriter

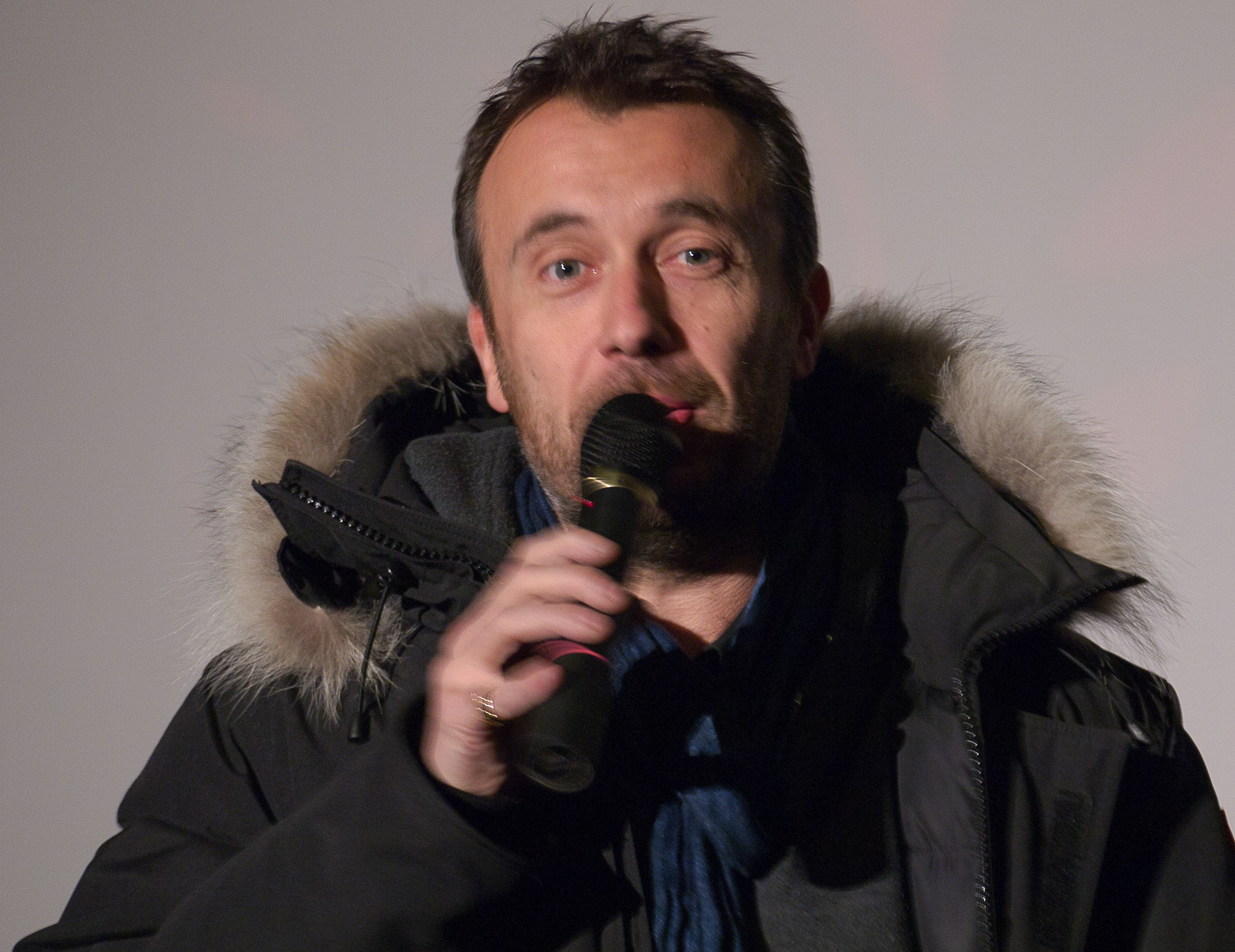
Cavayé in 2010

Fred Cavayé (Rennes, 14 December 1967) is a French director and screenwriter. Most known for Mea Culpa (2014), and the comedies Nothing to Hide (2018) and This Is the Goat! (2024).

== Personal life ==
He started working in the world of fashion as a photographer.

== Filmography ==
=== Feature Films ===
Year	English Title	Original Title	Notes
2008	Anything for Her	Pour elle	
2010	Point Blank	À bout portant	
2014	Mea Culpa		
2016	Radin!		
2018	Nothing to Hide	Le Jeu	
2021	Farewell, Mr. Haffmann	Adieu Monsieur Haffmann	
2024	This Is the Goat!	Les Chèvres !	
2026	Les Misérables		Post-production

=== Short films ===
- 1996: Jean-René
- 1999: J
- 2001: Chedope
- 2003: À l'arraché
- 2012: Les Infidèles – Le Prologue

=== Only writer ===
- 2008: Beauties at War (La guerre des Miss) by Patrice Leconte
- 2010: The Next Three Days (Les trois prochains jours) by Paul Haggis (remake of Pour elle)
