= Lucky Winners =

2024 French comedy film

- Theatrical release poster
- Directed by: Maxime Govare; Romain Choay
- Written by: Maxime Govare; Romain Choay
- Produced by: Renaud Chélélékian
- Starring: Fabrice Éboué; Audrey Lamy; Anouk Grinberg; Pauline Clément; Louise Coldefy
- Cinematography: Patrick Ghiringhelli
- Edited by: Samuel Danési
- Music by: Lionel Limiñana; David Menke
- Production companies: Les Improductibles; Marvelous Productions; France 2 Cinéma; C8 Films
- Distributed by: Warner Bros. Pictures
- Release date: 13 March 2024
- Running time: 103 minutes
- Country: France
- Language: French
- Box office: $3.3 million

Lucky Winners (French: Heureux Gagnants) is a 2024 French comedy film written and directed by Maxime Govare and Romain Choay.

== Cast ==
- Fabrice Éboué as Paul
- Audrey Lamy as Louise
- Anouk Grinberg as Sandra
- Pauline Clément as Julie
- Louise Coldefy as Mathilde
- Sami Outalbali as Ahmed
- Victor Meutelet as Thomas
