= A Good Jewish Boy =

Le Dernier des Juifs
- Theatrical release poster
- French: Le Dernier des Juifs
- Literally: The Last of the Jews
- Directed by: Noé Debré
- Written by: Noé Debré
- Produced by: Benjamin Elalouf
- Starring: Michael Zindel; Agnès Jaoui
- Cinematography: Boris Lévy
- Edited by: Géraldine Mangenot
- Music by: Valentin Hadjadj
- Production companies: Moonshaker; The Living; L'Embellie
- Distributed by: Ad Vitam
- Release date: 24 January 2024 (France)
- Running time: 90 minutes
- Country: France
- Language: French
- Box office: $1.3 million

A Good Jewish Boy (French: Le Dernier des Juifs, lit. 'The Last of the Jews') is a 2024 French comedy-drama film written and directed by Noé Debré in his feature-length directorial debut. It stars Michael Zindel and Agnès Jaoui as the last two Jews living in their neighborhood. It was released to positive reviews.

== Cast ==
- Michael Zindel as Ruben Bellisha
- Agnès Jaoui as Giselle Aknin
- Solal Bouloudnine as Asher
- Eva Huault as Mira
- Khalid Maadour as deputy mayor
- Pierre-Henry Salfati as the father
- Maurice Charbit as the kosher grocer
- Youssouf Gueye as Moussa
- Jean-Yves Freyburger as the priest
- Rony Kramer as Bouanich
