= Christmas Carole =

- International theatrical poster
- French: Un Noël en Famille
- Directed by: Jeanne Gottesdiener
- Written by: Jeanne Gottesdiener; Julie Ponsonnet
- Based on: Nutcrackers by Chrissy Lessey
- Produced by: Christophe Mazodier; Patrick Vandenbosch; Jean-Jacques Neira
- Starring: Noémie Lvovsky; Didier Bourdon; Alice Daubelcour; Jules Sagot; Janaïna Halloy-Fokan; Christophe Montenez
- Cinematography: Vincent Muller
- Edited by: Sylvie Gadmer
- Music by: Romain Allender
- Production companies: Belga Films; Polaris Films
- Distributed by: KMBO Films
- Release dates: 9 June 2024 (Rabat-Comedy International Film Festival); 15 June 2024 (Porquerolles Film Festival); 14 November 2024 (Germany); 18 December 2024 (France/Belgium/Switzerland)
- Country: France
- Language: French

Christmas Carole (French: Un Noël en Famille) is a 2024 French Christmas comedy film directed by Jeanne Gottesdiener in her feature directorial debut. Gottesdiener co-wrote the script with Julie Ponsonnet based on the 2022 PAGE Award Bronze winning English-language screenplay Nutcrackers by American author Chrissy Lessey. The film stars Noémie Lvovsky and Didier Bourdon in the lead roles. After screening at various film festivals, it is scheduled for wide theatrical release on 14 November 2024 in Germany and on 18 December 2024 in France, Belgium and French-speaking Switzerland.

The film, set mostly around a Christmas Eve dinner, revolves around the mayoress of a small town, Carole, played by Noémie Lvovsky, trying to juggle her municipal duties and family celebrations to little success.

== Cast ==
- Noémie Lvovsky as Carole Lamarre
- Didier Bourdon as Alain Lamarre
- Alice Daubelcour as Sarah Lamarre
- Jules Sagot as David Lamarre
- Janaïna Halloy-Fokan as Noa Lamarre
- Christophe Montenez as Balthazar
- Marie Bunel as Laura, the neighbor
- Renaud Rutten as Victor Fayol
- Sissi Duparc as Marlène

== Production ==
The film was shot in chronological order under the working title Noël au Balcon (literally Christmas on the Balcony) over the course of seven weeks, from 15 May to 30 June 2023 in the Wallonia region of Belgium, mainly between Limbourg and the Embourg area of Chaudfontaine, as well as in Hamoir and Liège, while the post-production was done concurrently in France.

Director Jeanne Gottesdiener took inspiration from several other French comedy films set mostly around a group of people in a single space, such as What's in a Name?, The Dinner Game, Kitchen with Apartment and Family Resemblances.

== Release ==
Christmas Carole had its world premiere on 9 June 2024 at the Rabat-Comedy International Film Festival in Rabat, Morocco, followed by an out of competition screening on 15 June 2024 at the Porquerolles Film Festival in France. It is scheduled for theatrical release first in Germany on 14 November 2024 by Happy Entertainment under the title Frohes Fest – Weihnachten retten wir die Welt, and a month later on 18 December 2024 in France by KMBO Films, as well as Belgium and French-speaking Switzerland. International sales are handled by France TV Distribution, who launched sales during the 2023 Marché du Film while the film was still shooting, and hosted the first film market screenings in mid-January 2024.

== Accolades ==
List of awards and nominations for Almost Legal
Award or film festival	Date of ceremony	Category	Recipient(s)	Result	Ref.
Rabat-Comedy International Film Festival	12 June 2024	Grand Prix	Jeanne Gottesdiener	Nominated	
