= David Salles =

French actor and director (born 1970)

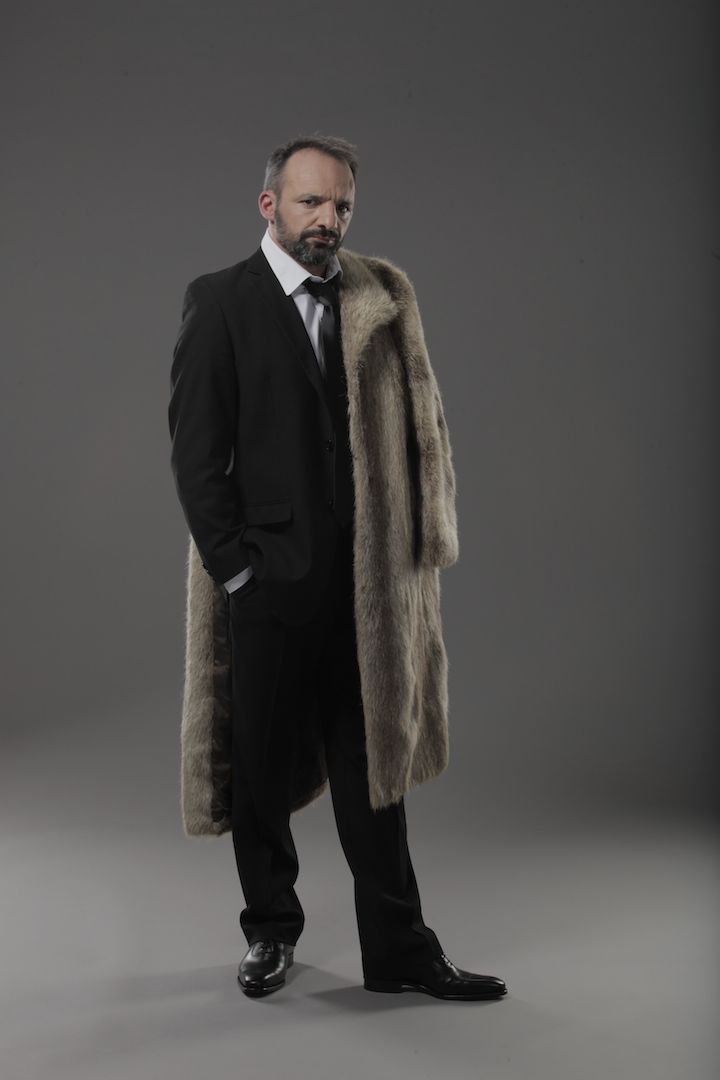
- David Salles
- Born: April 28, 1970 (age 54); France
- Occupations: Actor; Director

David Salles is a French actor and director. He was born 28 April 1970 in Maisons-Alfort, Val-de-Marne, France.
