= Idan Amedi =

Israeli singer and songwriter (born 1988)

Idan Amedi עידן עמדי
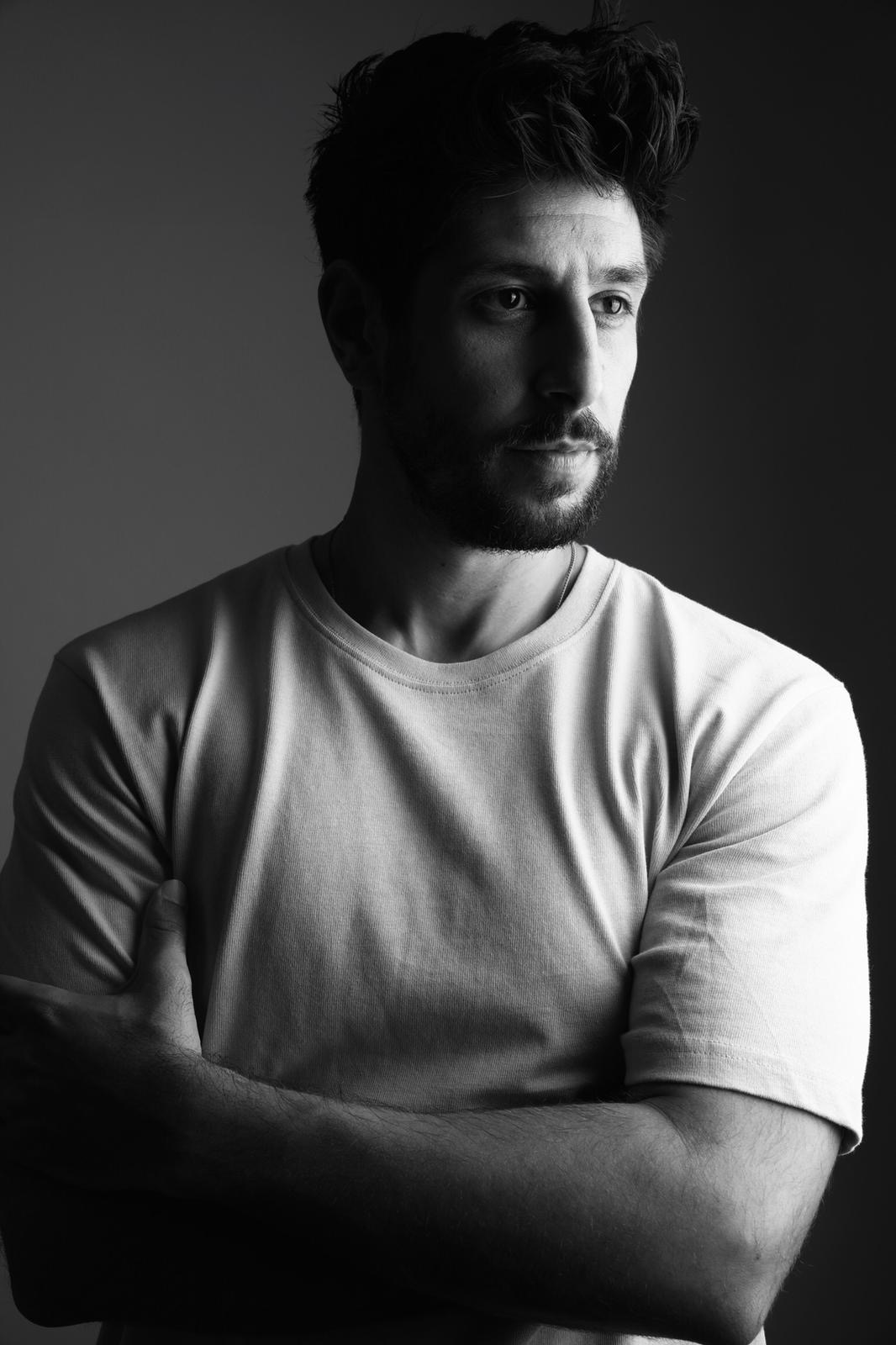
- Amedi, 2020

Background information
- Born: 19 February 1988 (age 38); Jerusalem
- Genres: Pop
- Occupations: Singer; songwriter
- Years active: 2010–present
- Label: Aroma Music
- Website: www.instagram.com/..

Idan Amedi (Hebrew: עידן עמדי; born February 19, 1988) is an Israeli singer-songwriter and actor who rose to fame on the reality show Kochav Nolad in 2010. He has released 6 studio albums, with hit singles like "Pain of Warriors" and "Finished." Amedi began acting in 2017, joining the cast of the TV action series Fauda, where he plays Sagi Tzur. He was called up as an IDF reservist during the Gaza war, and was seriously injured in January 2024 while reportedly demolishing Hamas tunnels in the Gaza Strip. In 2024 he was nominated for an Ophir Award for Best Actor for his role in the drama, Highway 65.

== Early life ==
Idan Amedi was born to a Kurdish Jewish family and raised in Jerusalem. During his mandatory service in the Israel Defense Forces, Amedi was in the combat engineering corps.

Amedi specializes in various martial arts, such as taekwondo and Thai boxing. Prior to his military service in 2005, he was the runner-up in the national taekwondo championship.

== Career ==
=== 2010–2014: Kochav Nolad, Idan Amedi, Bazman Hahachron ===
The beginning of Amedi's career as a singer and creator was in the audition for Kochav Nolad, in which Amedi performed with the song "Pain of Warriors", a song he wrote and composed himself for his experiences as a fighter during his military service in the combat engineering corps in the IDF.

At the end of that "Kochav Nolad" season in 2010, the song "Pain of Warriors" emerged as the first single of Amedi to the radio stations, and reached first place in the various chorus parades in Israel, including the Galgalz parade and the Reshet Gimel parade.

On January 23, 2011, another single came out of the first album, Tashlich (Throw). In May 2011, Amedi released the song Run to the Light.

On September 5, his first full album, Idan Amedi was released. Shortly before that, he released another single, "Elaiich (To you)".

Amedi wrote and composed all the songs of the album, the song "The Last Letter", written and composed according to the letters of Moshe Ohayon R.I.P as part of the project "Soon we will become a song". Most of the songs Amedi co-edited with Itamar Meiri and Eitan Raz.

In addition, Amedi wrote a song based on Rabbi Yisrael Meir Lau's book "Don't Send Your Hand to the Boy," called "Continues to Walk," as part of "The Voice Still Remains" project in collaboration with Reshet Gimel and Holocaust Memorial Information.

The album also includes "Pain of Warriors", which won the title "Song of the Year" in the annual 2011 chorus parades.

In the same year, Amedi also won the Rookie of the Year title in the Reshet Gimel network. The album was released by 'Aroma Music'. In May 2012, Idan Amedi's debut album reached the status of a gold album after sales of over 20,000 copies.

In February 2013, Amedi's second album, Bazman Hahachron (Recently) was released. The two singles that preceded the album, "Nigmar (Finished)" and "Beautiful Things to See" were successful and reached the top of the various chants. Next to the album came another single, "MIshum Ma (For some reason)".

In this album, Amdi continued to collaborate with the producers of his first album, Itamar Meiri and Eitan Raz.

In August 2013, Amedi's second album, Bazman Hahachron (Recently) reached the status of a gold album.

The song "Finished" won the "Song of the Year" title in the annual network of three-year chorus, and thus Amdi completed two winners of the title. Amdi even won the "Singer of the Year" title in this march.

"Nigmar (Finished)" is a song that Amedi wrote during his military service, telling the mosaic of Israeli society about "Oferet Yetzuka" Operation, in which Amedi participated as a combat commander in the combat engineering corps.

Years after the release of this album, Bazman Hahachron (Recently) and "Nigmar (Finished)."

=== 2014–2018: Ratzinu Lihiyot, Chelek Mehazman and Fauda debut ===
In October 2014, Amedi's debut single ("Old Voice of Memory") came out of his third album, Ratzinu Lihiyot (we wanted to be)". The song is about his memories of the Nahlaot neighborhood where his grandparents lived. It was first place on the Galgalz hit parade for a month.

In January 2015, he released Menasim (Trying) which combines Hebrew and Arabic. Three years later, a remake of the song became the theme song for the second season of the TV show Fauda, in which Amedi plays Sagi.

In this album, he performs a duet of "Yah Ribon Olam" with his brother Elad.

On May 17 of that year the album Ratzinu Lihiyot (We wanted to be) was released, produced by Tom Cohen.

On March 14, 2016, Amedi released the first single from his fourth album, called Chelek Mehazman (Part of the time) as the album's name, which he originally wrote for singer Rita. The song reached seventh place in the Galgalatz hit parade.

He released two more singles ("Ad Sheyaale Hayom Haba (until the next day)" and "Achshav Kulam Rokdim (Now everyone is dancing)"), in January 2017.

In March 2017, two months after the release of Chelek Mehazman (Part of the time), the album received gold album status following the sale of 20,000 copies. In January 2018, the album reached the platinum album status of over 40,000 copies.

In 2017, Amedi joined the cast of the TV drama Fauda, playing the character of Sagi Tzur, a new undercover man who joined the team.

In 2018, he won first place in the Soldier hit parade marking Israel's 70th anniversary. In the summer of that year, he performed at the amphitheater in Caesarea.

=== 2019–present: Zocher Kim'at Hakol, Highway 65 Superman ===
In January 2019, Amedi released "Ma At Margisha (What Do You Feel)", the first single for his fifth album to be released by the end of 2020.

In June 2019 he released "Ani Rotze (I Want)", and in February 2020, "Mipo Lesham (From Here To There)".

In May 2020, the single "Remember Almost Everything" came out. He wrote and directed the clip himself.

In August 2024, he was nominated for an Ophir Award for Best Actor for his role as a murder suspect in the drama, Highway 65.

In October 2024, he signed a new contract with Israeli broadcaster, Keshet 12. He will present a documentary for the network, detailing his rehabilitation since being seriously injured in the Gaza war. A new drama series is also in the works at the network, with Amedi playing the lead role.

In December 2024, Amedi released a new single "Superman". In January 2025, he released his sixth album, Superman. Israeli actress, Rotem Sela and journalist Danny Kushmaro also feature on the album with spoken parts.

== Awards and recognition ==
In 2024, he was named by Algemeiner Journal as one of "The Top 100 People Positively Influencing Jewish Life, 2024".

In March 2024, he respectfully declined an offer to light a ceremonial torch at the main state ceremony for the start of Yom Ha'atzmaut (Israeli Independence Day): "There's no greater honor but unfortunately I cannot accept the honor this year. So many heroes were discovered on that same black Shabbat [October 7 attacks]. Some were my troops in the past or in the current war. This year I'll stay home and commune with their memory, like many others in the nation of Israel.” He concluded: "I hope perhaps in the future I will be granted the merit to raise a torch thanks to the words I write and not due to war heroism."

== Discography ==
- Idan Amedi (2011)
- Bazman Hahachron (Recently) (2013)
- Ratzinu Lihiyot (we wanted to be) (2015)
- Chelek Mehazman (Part of the time) (2017)
- Zocher Kimaat Hakol (Remember Almost Everything) (2023)
- Superman (2025)

== Filmography ==
- Fauda (2017–present)
- Highway 65 (2024)
- Alumim

== Personal life ==
In May 2018, Amedi married Miriam Benyaminov, a social activist for people with disabilities. In December 2019 their first daughter was born. In May 2023 their second son was born.

After the outbreak of the Gaza war on October 7, 2023, Amedi was called up to join the IDF as a reservist. Amedi was among the first Israeli forces to reach Gaza's coastline and was frequently featured in photos and videos published of Israeli soldiers in Gaza, including ones marking for demolition Hamas tunnels in Shuja'iyya. On January 8, 2024, Amedi was seriously injured during a bombing operation of a Hamas tunnel in Southern Gaza.
