= Paul Belmondo (sculptor) =

French sculptor (1898–1982)

- Belmondo c. 1941–42
- Born: 8 August 1898; Sidi M'Hamed, French Algeria
- Died: 1 January 1982 (aged 83); Ivry-sur-Seine, France
- Education: École supérieure des beaux-arts d'Alger; Beaux-Arts de Paris
- Known for: Sculpture; medalist
- Notable work: Apollon, Jeannette, stèle Pouvreau
- Children: 3, including Jean-Paul
- Relatives: Paul Belmondo (grandson); Victor Belmondo (great-grandson)
- Awards: Prix Blumenthal (1926); Grand prix artistique de l'Algérie (1932); Grand prix de la ville de Paris (1936)

Paul Belmondo (8 August 1898 – 1 January 1982) was a French sculptor. He is the father of the actor Jean-Paul Belmondo.

== Biography ==
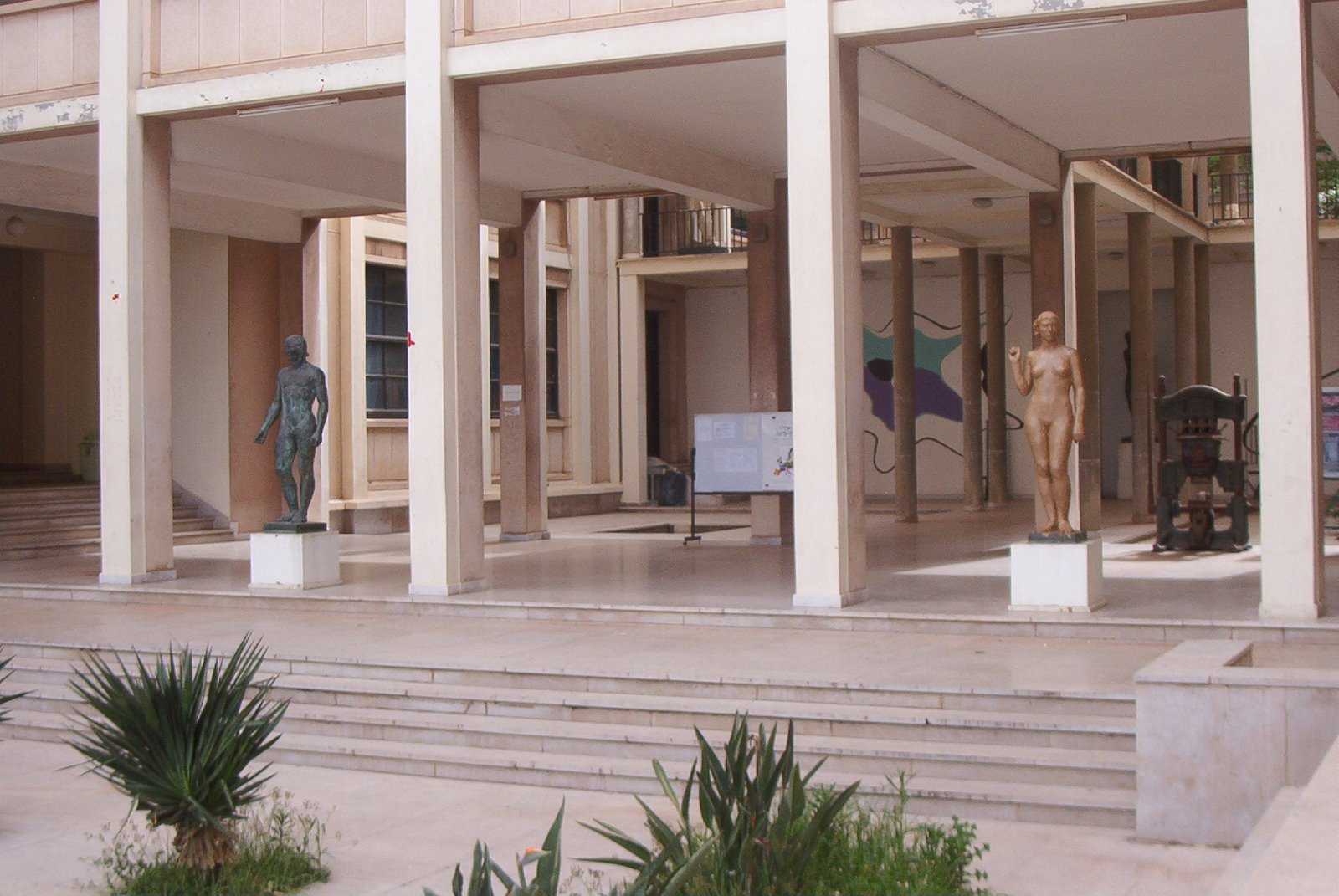
Works by Belmondo at the Ecole des Beaux-Arts, Algiers

Belmondo was born in Sidi M'Hamed, near Algiers, French Algeria, into a poor family of Italian origin (Piedmont and Sicily), the son of Paul Belmondo and Rose Cerrito. His early schooling was at Dordor in Algiers. Passionate about art and design, he began carving at the age of 13 years. He studied architecture at the Ecole des Beaux-Arts in Algiers, but his studies were interrupted by the First World War. He was gassed at the Battle of Saint-Mihiel, and was then demobilized.

Thanks to a grant from the government of Algeria, he continued his studies in Paris where he became the student, then the friend, of Charles Despiau and Jean Boucher. He won the Grand Prix de Rome and Prix Blumenthal in 1926. He married Sarah Madeleine Rainaud-Richard in Paris in 1930. Three children were born to the marriage, Alain-Paul (1931–2025), Jean-Paul (1933–2021), and Muriel (1945). He received the Grand Prix artistique of Algeria in 1932 and then the Grand Prix of the city of Paris in 1936.

During World War II he was a member of Groupe Collaboration, which advocated collaboration with the Nazi authorities. He was vice-president of the arts section (1941–1945). In 1941 he participated in a "study tour" organized by Goebbels in Germany, in which French painters and sculptors visited German cultural sites and art workshops. However, Belmondo was not "worried" after the Liberation since many other well-known artists had also participated.

Before the war, he received many orders from the state, including the Palais de Chaillot with Leo-Ernest Drivier and Marcel Gimond. He became a professor at the École nationale supérieure des Beaux-Arts de Paris in 1956 and a member of the Institute in 1960.

== Death ==
He died, aged 83, on 1 January 1982 in Paris. He is buried in Montparnasse Cemetery. His workshop was located in old stables, at the Avenue Denfert-Rochereau in Paris.

== Work ==
Belmondo's work continues the neoclassical academic style, seeking harmonious forms with simple lines and smooth surfaces. He also made medals and illustrations for art books, including Georges Courteline's Boubouroche. Two bronzes, Jeannette and Apollo, have been located in the Tuileries Palace Gardens since 1988 (donated by the Belmondo family); the family donated another copy of Jeannette to the World Intellectual Property Organization on 9 September 1986 for the centennial of the Berne Convention. When Jean-Baptiste Carpeaux's sculpture Dance was moved from the exterior of Opera Garnier, Belmondo made the replacement for the original location.

A retrospective exhibition of his work, entitled "The sculpture of serenity", was organized in several cities in France from 1997 at the initiative of the Ministry of Culture. The National Museum of Fine Arts in Algiers has a large collection of sculptures by Belmondo.

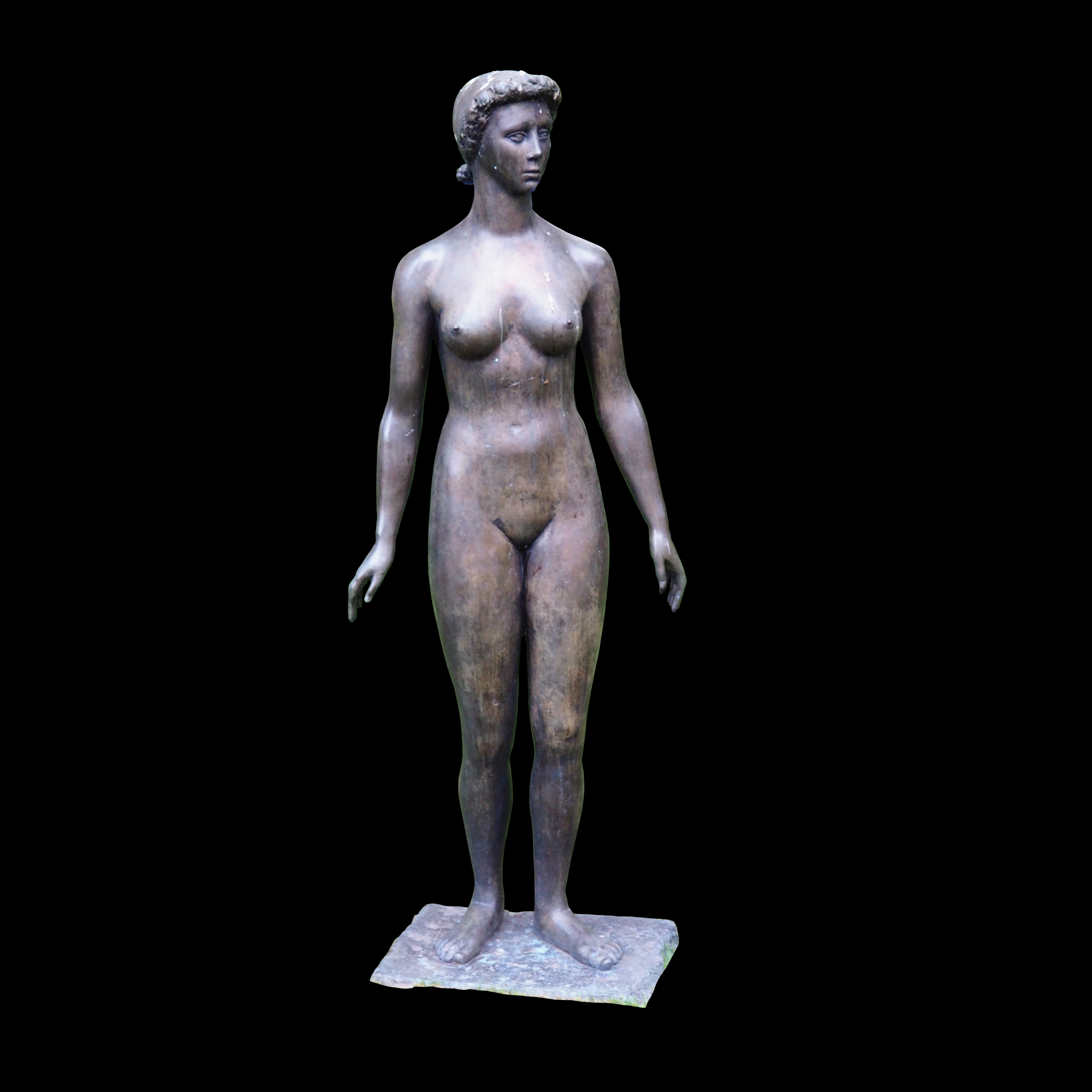
Jeannette, on display in the gardens of the headquarters of the World Intellectual Property Organization, Geneva

== Musée Paul Belmondo ==
In March 2007 Jean-Paul Belmondo, his brother Alain and his sister Muriel donated all works of their father they owned to the Paris suburb Boulogne-Billancourt: 259 sculptures, 444 medals and almost 900 drawings as well as sketchbooks and preparatory work. Emmanuel Bréon, curator of the Musée des Années Trente (Museum of the 1930s) in Boulogne-Billancourt had proposed that a museum dedicated to Paul Belmondo could be located in the area. The Belmondo collection was temporarily stored in the Musée des Années Trente.

The new museum was built in Buchillot castle, an eighteenth-century folly. The building, a historic monument, owned by the city, was renovated for a sum of over 2.7 million euros. It was initially expected to open at the end of 2008, but was delayed until 2010, opening to the public on 14 September 2010. The Architectural Review discussed the design, writing that:

The designers describe the first space as 'a setting of the utmost serenity possible' where a 'smooth, otherworldly luminescence' is created through a diffusion of natural and hidden artificial lighting. 'Niches, alcoves, raised floors, openings, and contrived backdrops create multiples sight lines, discoveries and frames for the landscape,' said the architects.

From this serene white space you enter the second chamber which, by contrast, is made from timber. This is designed to be 'reminiscent of the backstage of a theatre or an artist's workroom, which is intended to evoke memories and references to other times and other performers.'

== Literature ==
- Paul Belmondo : La sculpture sereine, ouvrage collectif, éditions Somogy, 2001.
- Jean Dutourd, Paul Belmondo, éditions Le Chêne, 1984.
