= This Is the Goat! =

- Theatrical release poster
- French: Les Chèvres !
- Directed by: Fred Cavayé
- Written by: Fred Cavayé; Matthieu Rumani; Nicolas Slomka; Sarah Kaminsky
- Produced by: Éric Jehelmann; Philippe Rousselet
- Starring: Dany Boon; Jérôme Commandeur; Claire Chust; Alexandre Desrousseaux; Grégory Gadebois; Marie-Anne Chazel; Alexandre MOUSLI
- Cinematography: Denis Rouden
- Edited by: Mickaël Dumontier
- Music by: Christophe Julien
- Production companies: Jérico Films; Pathé; TF1 Films Production; Beside Productions
- Distributed by: Pathé
- Release date: 21 February 2024 (France)
- Running time: 100 minutes
- Countries: France; Belgium
- Language: French
- Box office: $1.3 million

This Is the Goat! (French: Les Chèvres !, lit. 'The Goats!') is 2024 French-Belgian historical comedy film directed by Fred Cavayé. It stars Dany Boon as Maître Pompignac, a lawyer who has lost every case but must defend a goat who is accused killing a Marshal of France.

== Cast ==
- Dany Boon as Maître Pompignac
- Jérôme Commandeur as Maître Valvert
- Claire Chust as Camille
- Alexandre Desrousseaux as Jean
- Grégory Gadebois as Cardinal Mazarin
- Marie-Anne Chazel as the widow Piquet
- Vincent Grass as old Jean
- Sophie-Marie Larrouy as Anne of Austria
- Fatsah Bouyahmed as the baron
- Bun Hay Mean as the bailiff
- André Penvern as the judge
- Corentin Masson as Assistant Valvert
- Alexandre Mousli as Louis XIV
