= Pauline Clément =

French actress (born 1986)

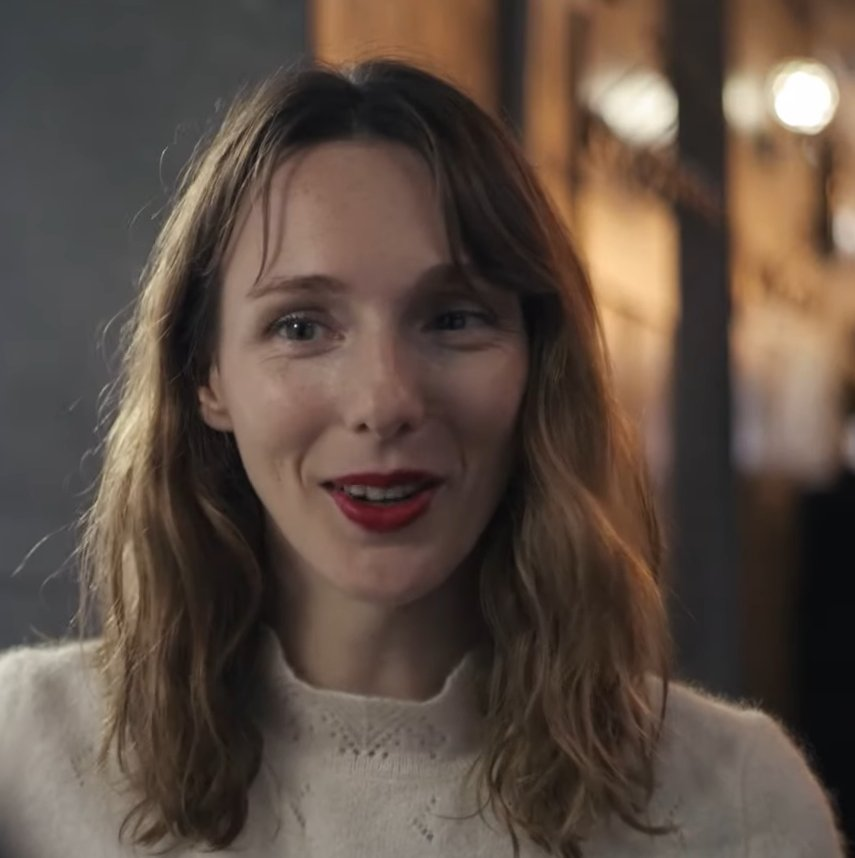
- Clement in 2021
- Born: 8 November 1986 (age 39)
- Occupation: Actress

Pauline Clément (born 8 November 1986) is a French actress and comedian. She is known for performing in film, theatre, and online videos. She is a resident at the Comédie-Française and a member of sketch comedy group Yes Vous Aime.

== Early life and education ==
After experiencing academic difficulties due to dyslexia, Clément pursued several occupations, including carpentry, cabinetmaking, and aesthetics, before discovering her interest in theatre and improvisation. She later studied at the Conservatoire national supérieur d'art dramatique (CNSAD).

== Career ==
Clément's career has been described as atypical because of the contrast between her stage performances and her work with Yes vous aime. In 2017 she said, "it's true that it sometimes gives me the impression of leading a double life [...] but I find my balance there. At the Comédie-Française, they choose the roles for me, it is oriented towards what I can play, even if they are pieces that are very different from each other, and sometimes very modern. In Yes, I am freer, I can create characters."

=== Comédie-Française ===
In 2015 Clément joined the Comédie-Française as a resident. That year she appeared in Karl Kraus' play Les derniers jours de l'humanité, staged by David Lescot. In 2016 she played Hélène in the Eugène Labiche comedy Un chapeau de paille d'Italie, staged by Giorgio Barberio Corsetti. She also featured in Arthur Schnitzler's La ronde, staged by Anne Kessler, and appeared in La règle du jeu, directed by Christiane Jatahy; Georges Feydeau's L'hôtel du libre-échange, staged by Isabelle Nanty; and played Hyacinte in Les Fourberies de Scapin by Molière, staged by Denis Podalydès.

In 2020 Clément was nominated for a Molière Award for Best Female Newcomer for her performance in George Feydeau's A Flea in Her Ear, directed by Lilo Baur.

=== Yes vous aime ===
In 2012 Clément co-founded the comedy group Yes vous aime, whose videos were distributed on YouTube and Canal+. Following the departure of fellow member Louise Coldefy she became the group's only female member, and often brought a feminist perspective to its writing and performances.

=== Film ===
Clément appeared in the short films Amer and Partie fine, directed by Guillaume Crémonèse and Bertrand Usclat, both fellow members of Yes vous aime. In 2016 she made her feature film debut in C'est la vie!, directed by Éric Toledano and Olivier Nakache. The following year she appeared in Lola et ses frères, directed by Jean-Paul Rouve.

In 2021 Clément was cast in a supporting role in the romantic comedy Je te veux, moi non-plus. In 2022 she starred alongside Bertrand Usclat and Ahmed Sylla in Jumeaux mais pas trop. In 2024 she starred in the romantic comedy Une fille au-dessus de tout, directed by Jean-Luc Gaget.

== Filmography ==
=== Film ===
| Year | Title | Role | Notes | Ref |
|---|---|---|---|---|
| 2016 | C'est la vie! | Bride-to-be | | |
| 2017 | Lola et ses frères | Sarah | | |
| 2018 | Mirai | Kun | Voice (dub) | |
| 2019 | Hors normes | Myriam | | |
| 2020 | Les Blagues de Toto | Miss Jolibois | | |
| 2020 | Impionçable | Amandiane | | |
| 2020 | Mainstream | | Short film | |
| 2021 | Dear Mother | Saleswoman | | |
| 2021 | Je te veux, moi non-plus | Lula | | |
| 2021 | Les Fantasmes | Ismène | | |
| 2022 | Menteur | Chloé | | |
| 2022 | Marie rêve | Charlotte | | |
| 2022 | Jumeaux mais pas trop | Noémie Vignon | | |
| 2023 | Les Blagues de Toto 2: Classe verte | Miss Jolibois | | |
| 2024 | Lucky Winners | Julie | | |
| 2026 | Comédie-Française | Nina Cardi | Also writer | |

=== Television ===
| Year | Title | Role | Notes | Ref |
|---|---|---|---|---|
| 2017 | Calls | Sophie | Episode: "Boîte Noire (Boeing 747)" | |
| 2018 | Un entretien | Alice | | |
| 2018 | Broute | | | |
| 2018 | Call My Agent! | Event manager | Episode: "Ask" | |
| 2019 | Abonne-toi | | | |
| 2021 | Fluide | Emma | Main role; 10 episodes | |
| 2021 | HPI | Myriam Forestier | Episode: "Hep et Soja" | |
| 2022 | Moitié.e.s | | | |
| 2023 | Knok | | | |
| 2025 | Néro the Assassin | Josephine | | |
