= Breaking Point (2023 film) =

- Theatrical release poster
- French: Un coup de dés
- Directed by: Yvan Attal
- Screenplay by: Yvan Attal; Yaël Langmann
- Based on: Ball-trap; 202 play by Éric Assous
- Produced by: Olivier Delbosc; Yvan Attal
- Starring: Yvan Attal; Maïwenn; Guillaume Canet; Marie-Josée Croze
- Cinematography: Rémy Chevrin
- Edited by: Albertine Lastera
- Music by: Dan Lévy
- Production companies: Films Sous Influence; Curiosa Films; SND; France 2 Cinéma; Umedia
- Distributed by: SND
- Release dates: 2 October 2023 (Festival Cinéroman); 24 January 2024 (France)
- Running time: 85 minutes
- Country: France
- Language: French

Breaking Point (French: Un coup de dés) is a 2023 French thriller film directed by Yvan Attal and freely inspired by a text by Éric Assous. The film is about a loyal husband who covers for his best friend's affairs but starts to fall for his mistress.

== Cast ==
- Yvan Attal as Mathieu
- Maïwenn as Delphine
- Guillaume Canet as Vincent
- Marie-Josée Croze as Juliette
- Alma Jodorowsky as Elsa, Vincent's mistress
- Victor Belmondo as Alex
