= Highway 65 (film) =

- כביש הסרגל
- Directed by: Maya Dreifuss
- Written by: Maya Dreifuss
- Produced by: Moshe Edri; Haim Mecklberg; Estee Yacov-Mecklberg; Gilles Sacuto; Miléna Poylo
- Starring: Tali Sharon; Idan Amedi; Igal Naor
- Cinematography: Amit Yasur; Itay Gross
- Edited by: Nili Feller; Ronit Porat
- Music by: Pierre Oberkampf
- Distributed by: United King Films
- Release dates: April 2024 (Reims Polar); 30 January 2025 (Israel)
- Running time: 109 minutes
- Countries: Israel; France
- Language: Hebrew

Highway 65 (Hebrew: כביש הסרגל) is a 2024 Israeli-French drama film written and directed by Maya Dreifuss. The film stars Tali Sharon and Idan Amedi. It received nine Ophir Award nominations, including Best Film, Best Actress, Best Actor and Best Director. It was released theatrically in Israel on 30 January 2025.

== Plot summary ==
Daphna (Sharon) is a dedicated police detective that puts her career ahead of her personal life and pursuit of a husband. Her dogged pursuit of justice and investigations into powerful figures in Tel Aviv leads to her transfer to low-key Afula. There, she begins to investigate the disappearance of a young widow, Orly (Fein), whose husband was killed in the 2006 Lebanon War.

Orly's soldier husband was the son of an influential and corrupt property developer (Igal Naor). He and his wife (von Schwarze) appear unconcerned about Orly’s disappearance. However, their surviving son, Matan (Idan Amedi) shares Daphna's concerns about Orly's whereabouts. As Daphna delves deeper in Orla's personal life, she comes to believe that she had been involved in a secret romance and that she was murdered.

== Cast ==
- Tali Sharon as Daphna
- Idan Amedi as Matan
- Sara von Schwarze as Rona
- Dilka as Ahuva
- Igal Naor as Nissim
- Boaz Konforty as Cabri
- Anastasia Fein as Orly
- Shahaf Ifhar as Nahumi

== Reception ==
Hannah Brown of The Jerusalem Post praised the film as a "a tense, neo-noir thriller with well-drawn characters and atmosphere that is thoroughly entertaining from start to finish." She continued to praise the casting: "Sharon has a great screen presence" and "Amedi is outstanding as the sexy, brooding guy who may be misunderstood – or very dangerous."

The film was also praised by Yedioth Ahronoth who gave it 4 out of 5 stars: "Daphna is a fascinating female character, well-written and superbly performed by Tali Sharon, in her best role to date. She is one of the most interesting female characters seen recently in Israeli cinema because she does not succumb to some of the female stereotypes we are used to."

=== Nominations ===
The film was nominated for nine Ophir Awards in 2024:

- Best Feature Film
- Best Actress - Tali Sharon
- Best Actor - Idan Amedi
- Best Director - Maya Dreifuss
- Best Editing - Nili Feller and Ronit Porat
- Best Screenplay - Maya Dreifuss
- Best Makeup - Esther Ben-Noon
- Best Cinematography - Amit Yasur
- Best Sound - Avi Mizrahi and Ran Tsrouya

=== Awards ===
It was awarded the Grand Prize for Best Film at the 4th Reims Polar Thriller Film Festival in France in April 2024.
