= The Last Men =

- Directed by: David Oelhoffen
- Written by: Les Chiens jaunes by Alain Gandy (novel)
- Produced by: Frédéric Bouté, Jacques Perrin; Nico Elghozi; Mathieu Simonetla
- Starring: Guido Caprino; Andrzej Chyra; Nuno Lopes; Axel Granberger; Yann Goven; Felix Meyer
- Cinematography: Guillaume Deffontaines
- Edited by: Sandie Bompar
- Music by: Superpoze
- Production companies: Galatea Films; Allons Voir; Versus Production
- Distributed by: Diaphana Distribution
- Release dates: September 2023 (Deauville); 21 February 2024 (France)
- Running time: 121 minutes
- Country: France
- Language: French

The Last Men is a 2023 French World War II historical drama film set in French Indochina in 1945 where a group of French soldiers struggled to survive in the jungle after being defeated by the Japanese army. The film was produced by Jacques Perrin who serves as narrator of the film it would be last film during his lifetime before his death.
