= A Little Something Extra =

- Theatrical release poster
- French: Un p'tit truc en plus
- Directed by: Artus
- Screenplay by: Artus; Clément Marchand
- Produced by: Pierre Forette; Thierry Wong
- Starring: Artus; Clovis Cornillac; Alice Belaïdi
- Cinematography: Jean-Marie Dreujou
- Edited by: Jean-François Elie
- Music by: Thomas Besson
- Production companies: Auvergne-Rhône-Alpes Cinéma; BNP Paribas; Cine Nomine
- Distributed by: Pan Distribution
- Release date: 2 May 2024
- Running time: 99 minutes
- Country: France
- Language: French
- Budget: $7.1 million
- Box office: $84 million

A Little Something Extra is 2024 French comedy film about a father and son, both criminals, who take refuge in a summer camp for young adults with disabilities, posing as a resident and his educator.

== Plot ==
To escape the police, a son and his father find refuge in a summer camp for young adults with disabilities, posing as a boarder and his educator.

== Cast ==
- Artus as Paulo / Sylvain
- Clovis Cornillac as Lucien
- Alice Belaïdi as Alice
- Marc Riso as Marc
- Céline Groussard as Céline
- Gad Abecassis as Gad
- Ludovic Boul as Ludovic
- Stanislas Carmont as Alexandre
- Marie Colin as Marie
- Thibaut Conan as Thibaut
- Mayane-Sarah El Baze as Mayanne
- Théophile Leroy as Baptiste
- Arnaud Toupense as Arnaud
- Sofian Ribes as Soso
- Boris Pitoeff as Boris

== Production ==
A Little Something Extra is the first feature film directed by Artus. The cast includes Artus, Clovis Cornillac, Alice Belaïdi, and Marc Riso.

== Release ==
In December 2023, the company Pan Distribution announced a release date for the A Little Something Extra, then scheduled for December 1, 2024.

The film premiered on April 10, 2024, at the Rencontres du cinéma de Gérardmer, in the presence of the director and finally released in theaters earlier than announced: May 1, 2024.

== Reception ==
The film achieved the second best start in the history of French cinema, behind Bienvenue chez les Ch'tis in 2008. In 20 days, the film has accumulated more than 3 million admissions in France. The film grossed over $50 million in its six-week run in French theaters and had nearly 7 million admissions. In August, the film exceeded 10 million admissions, becoming the 12th highest-grossing French film of all time. It was the most watched film in French cinemas in 2024, with 10.3 million tickets sold.

== Awards and nominations ==
- 2025: Nominated for the César Award for Best First Film at the 2025 César Awards.

== Remake ==
In May 2025, Sony Pictures optioned the rights to remake the film in English, Spanish, Portuguese and Arabic. The Spanish-language remake Haciendo amigos was released in 2026.
