= Victor Belmondo =

French actor (born 1993)

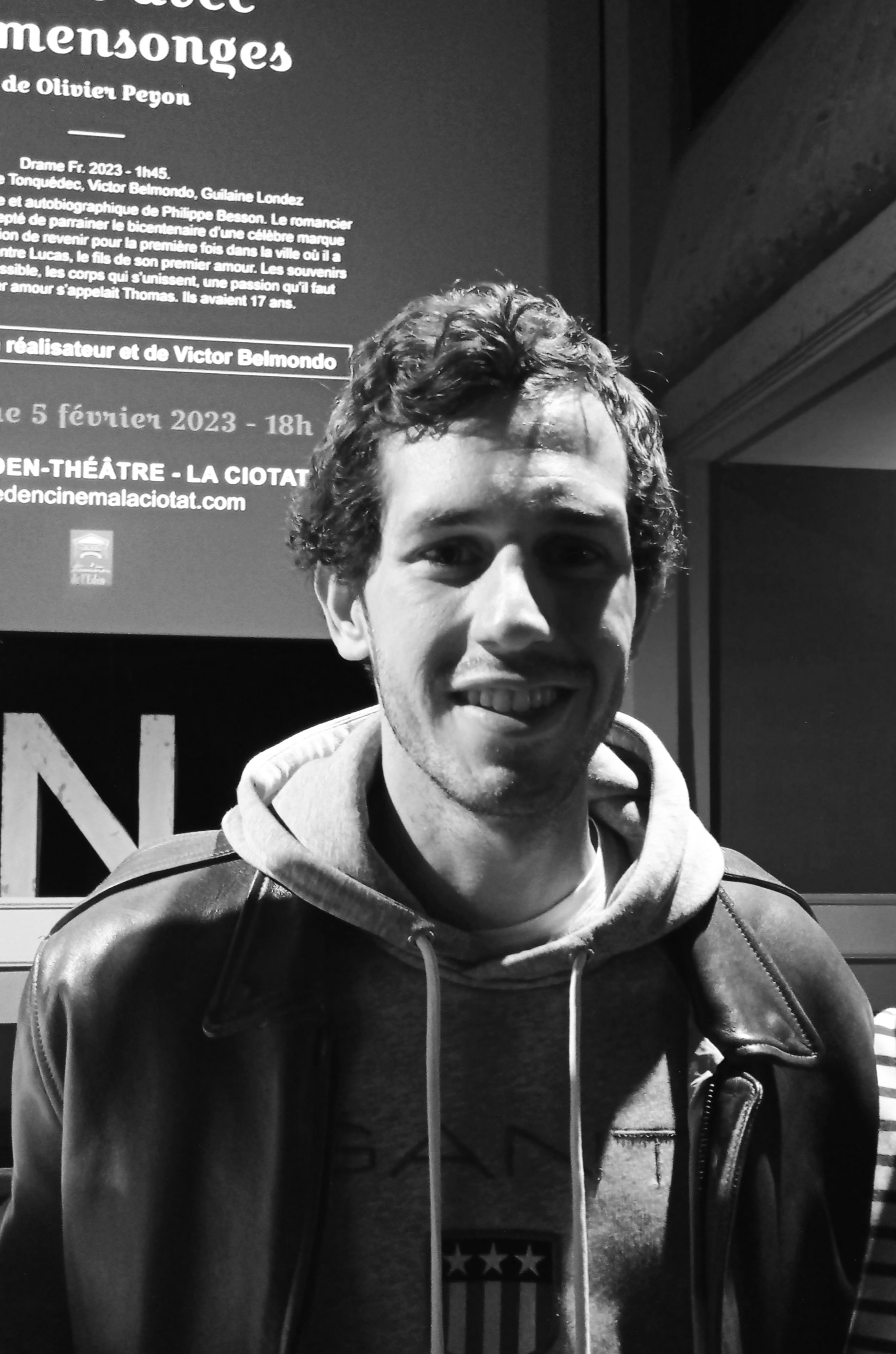
- Belmondo in 2023
- Born: 15 December 1993 (age 32); Boulogne-Billancourt, France
- Occupation: Actor
- Years active: 2012–present
- Father: Paul Belmondo
- Relatives: Jean-Paul Belmondo (grandfather); Paul Belmondo (great-grandfather)

Victor Belmondo (born 15 December 1993) is a French actor. He is son of racing driver Paul Belmondo and television presenter Luana Belmondo, and the grandson of actor Jean-Paul Belmondo.

== Filmography ==
=== Film ===
Year	Title	Role	Notes
2015	The Very Private Life of Mister Sim	Lino Matteotti (age 19)	
2018	Vous êtes jeunes, vous êtes beaux	Alexandre	
2019	Sweetheart	Théo	
2019	All Inclusive	Thibault	
2019	Versus	Kevin	
2020	De Gaulle	Hettier de Boislambert	
2021	Fly Me Away	Thomas Reinhard	
2021	Drift Away	Quentin	
2022	Lie with Me	Lucas Andrieu	
2023	Take a Chance on Me	Alexandre Moreno	
2023	Breaking Point	Alex Moret	
2024	Elle & lui & le reste du monde	Marco	
2024	To Live, To Die, To Live Again	Cyril	
2025	Bastion 36	Antoine Cerda	
2026	Masterplan	Jay	

=== Television ===
- Bardot (2023)
- Rojo y negro (Le rouge et le noir) 2026
