= Artus (actor) =

French actor, director and comedian (born 1987)

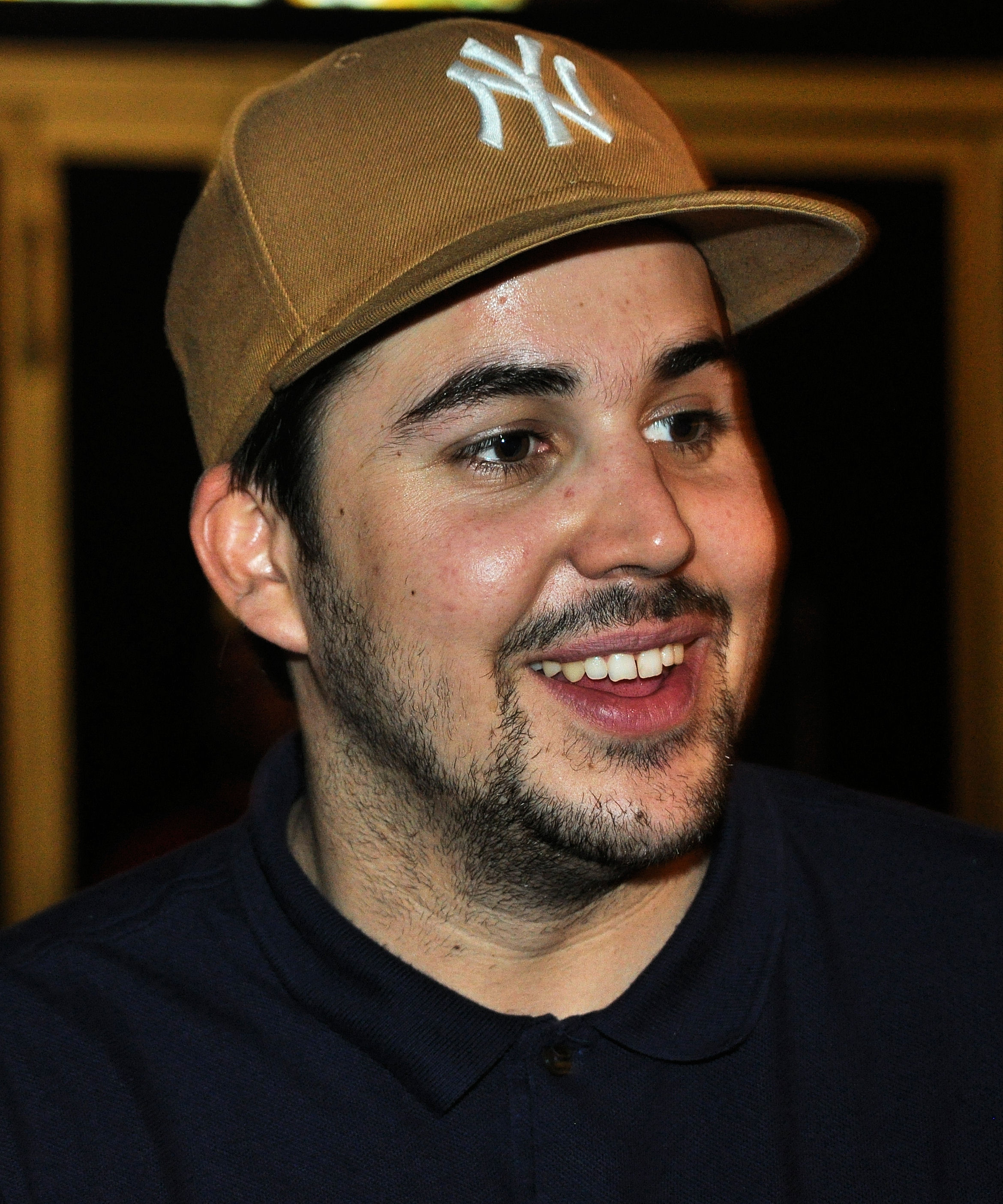
- Artus at the Casino de Paris, 8 June 2013
- Born: Victor Artus Solaro; 17 August 1987 (age 39); Le Chesnay, Yvelines, France
- Occupations: Actor; director; comedian
- Years active: 2010–present
- Spouse: Sarah Nasrallah (m. 2023)

Victor Artus Solaro (born 17 August 1987), known by his stage name Artus (French pronunciation: [aʁtys], is a French actor, director and comedian.

== Filmography ==
Year	Title	Role	Director	Notes
2013	What Ze Teuf	Mickael	Benjamin Euvrard	TV series (15 episodes)
2014	Repas de famille	The cop	Pierre-Henry Salfati	
2017	C'est tout pour moi	Marc	Nawell Madani & Ludovic Colbeau-Justin	
2017	La Colo	The monitor	Sébastien Kubiak	Short
2017	The Bureau	Jonas Maury	Mathieu Demy, Eric Rochant, Samuel Collardey	TV series (23 episodes)
2018	Budapest		Xavier Gens	
2018	Girls with Balls	Coach	Olivier Afonso	
2019	A Good Doctor	Wilfried	Tristan Séguéla	
2024	A Little Something Extra	Paulo/Sylvain	Artus	
TBA	Milo		Nicole Garcia	

== Theater ==
Year	Title	Theater
2011–12	Full Monty	Kawa Théâtre
2012	Tout baigne	L'Amuse théâtre
2017	Duels à Davidéjonatown	Théâtre Les Feux de la Rampe

== One Man Show ==
- 2010: C'était bien quand je serai p'tit
- 2011: Va jouer sur l’autoroute
- 2012-2013: De A à S
- 2014: Al Dente
- 2015-2016: Saignant à point
- 2018: Artus part en tournée
- 2024: Artus - One Man Show

== Television ==
From 2011 to 2014, he presented sketches on the show On n'demande qu'à en rire, where he gained notoriety.

He is the host of the 2019 Netflix original show Nailed It! France!

== Other ==
In 2016, he was a contestant during the seventh season of Danse avec les stars and he reached the final.

In 2017, he co-hosted the 11th Globes de Cristal Award with Estelle Denis.
