= Geneviève Mnich =

French actress

Geneviève Mnich (born 19 February 1942), is a French actress. She has appeared in 80 films since 1972.

She was born in Cuffies, Aisne, France.

== Filmography ==
Year	Title	Role	Director	Notes
1972	Les camisards	Flore Génoyer	René Allio	
1973	George Who?	Ursule	Michèle Rosier	
1973	The Mother and the Whore	Veronika's friend	Jean Eustache	
1974	Procès aux heureux	Christiane	Krassimira Rad	TV Movie
1975	Les prétendants de Madame Berrou	Louise Berrou	Hervé Baslé	TV Movie
1975	Vivre à deux	Brigitte	Hervé Baslé	TV Mini-Series
1975	Marie-Antoinette	Rose Bertin	Guy Lefranc	TV Mini-Series
1976	Mon coeur est rouge	The agency director	Michèle Rosier	
1977	Pourquoi pas!	Fernand's ex-wife	Coline Serreau	
1977	Spoiled Children	Guite Bonfils	Bertrand Tavernier	
1977	Ben et Bénédict	Bernard's mistress	Paula Delsol	
1977	Les rebelles	Lilette	Pierre Badel	TV Series (1 episode)
1977	Pierrot la chanson	Maria	Hervé Baslé	TV Series (1 episode)
1978	The Suspended Vocation	Sister Théophile	Raúl Ruiz	
1978	Les procès témoins de leur temps	Maddalena	Philippe Lefebvre	TV Series (1 episode)
1979	Jean le Bleu	Jean's mother	Hélène Martin	TV Movie
1979	Un fils pour l'automne	Rolande	Jean-Pierre Marchand	TV Movie
1979	Le journal	Christine	Philippe Lefebvre	TV Mini-Series
1980	My American Uncle	René's mother	Alain Resnais	
1980	Les liaisons dangereuses	Madame de Volanges	Claude Barma	TV Movie
1980	Histoires étranges	Henriette	Pierre Badel	TV Mini-Series
1981	Beau Pere	Simone	Bertrand Blier	
1981	Le jardinier	The Mother of the Child	Jean-Pierre Sentier	
1981	Les Uns et les Autres	Jeanne	Claude Lelouch	
1981	Nous te mari-e-rons	Annick	Jacques Fansten	TV Movie
1981	Un jour sombre dans la vie de Marine	Hélène	Josyane Serror	TV Movie
1981	Guerre en pays neutre	Elsa Nagy	Philippe Lefebvre	TV Mini-Series
1981	Messieurs les jurés	Jeanne Puiseaux	Gérard Gozlan	TV Series (1 episode)
1982	Qu'est-ce qui fait courir David?	Rebecca	Élie Chouraqui	
1983	La bête noire	The conveyor	Patrick Chaput	
1983	Une pierre dans la bouche	Suzanne	Jean-Louis Leconte	
1983	Three Crowns of the Sailor	Voice	Raúl Ruiz	
1983	Les uns et les autres	Jeanne	Claude Lelouch	TV Mini-Series
1983	Dorothée, danseuse de corde	Juliette Azere	Jacques Fansten	TV Series (1 episode)
1984	Love Unto Death	Anne Jourdet	Alain Resnais	
1984	A Sunday in the Country	Marie-Thérèse	Bertrand Tavernier	
1985	Mariage blanc	Olga	Peter Kassovitz	TV Movie
1986	The Last Image	Madame Lanier	Mohammed Lakhdar-Hamina	
1986	Yiddish Connection	Lucienne	Paul Boujenah	
1987	De guerre lasse	Louise	Robert Enrico	
1987	Je tue à la campagne	Adilia	Josée Dayan	TV Movie
1988	L'argent	The orphanage director	Jacques Rouffio	TV Movie
1988	Le chevalier de Pardaillan	Jeanne De Piennes	Josée Dayan	TV Series (1 episode)
1988	Les Cinq Dernières Minutes	Madame Michalon	Roger Pigaut	TV Series (1 episode)
1988	Les enquêtes du commissaire Maigret	Evelyne Schneider	Jean-Marie Coldefy	TV Series (1 episode)
1989	La Révolution française	Anne-Françoise-Marie Boisdeveix	Robert Enrico & Richard T. Heffron	
1989	La vallée des espoirs	Madame Holmann	Jean-Pierre Marchand	TV Mini-Series
1990	Nouvelles de Marcel Aymé	Madame Frioulat	Hervé Baslé	TV Series (1 episode)
1991	La neige et le feu	Madame Fournier	Claude Pinoteau	
1991	Les caquets de l'accouchée	The mother	Hervé Baslé	TV Movie
1992	Les genoux cagneux	The baker	Hervé Baslé	TV Movie
1992	Le JAP, juge d'application des peines	Catherine	Josée Dayan	TV Series (1 episode)
1993	Vent d'est	Madame Brandt	Robert Enrico	
1993	Les maîtres du pain	Fifine	Hervé Baslé	TV Mini-Series
1994	Le fils du cordonnier	Madame Gervin	Hervé Baslé	TV Mini-Series
1995	Ainsi soient-elles	Eric's mother	Patrick Alessandrin & Lisa Azuelos	
1995	Fils unique	The mother	Philippe Landoulsi	Short
1995	Machinations	Marie Beausset	Gérard Vergez	TV Movie
1995	Les mercredis de la vie	The father	Caroline Huppert	TV Series (1 episode
1996	Le vent de l'oubli	Anna	Chantal Picault	TV Movie
1996	L'allée du roi	Madame de Neuillan	Nina Companeez	TV Mini-Series
1997	Les filles du maître de chai	Marie	François Luciani	TV Movie
1997	Entre terre et mer	Berthe	Hervé Baslé	TV Mini-Series
1998	Le monde à l'envers	Anne's mother	Rolando Colla	
2000	Combats de femme	Françoise	Lou Jeunet	TV Series (1 episode)
2000	Les Cordier, juge et flic	Estelle's mother	Henri Helman	TV Series (1 episode)
2001	Candidature	Jury member	Emmanuel Bourdieu	
2001	Les petites mains	Mado	Lou Jeunet	TV Movie
2001	Agathe et le grand magasin	Madame Debarre	Bertrand Arthuys	TV Movie
2002	Le Champ dolent, le roman de la terre	Finette	Hervé Baslé	TV Mini-Series
2003	Elle est des nôtres	Christine's mother	Siegrid Alnoy	
2004	L'âge de raison	Madame Kaufman	Myriam Aziza	Short
2005	Not Here to Be Loved	Françoise's mother	Stéphane Brizé	
2005	Avocats & associés	Madame Arnay	Patrice Martineau	TV Series (1 episode)
2005	Josephine, Guardian Angel	Claudine	Laurent Lévy	TV Series (1 episode)
2006	Poison Friends	The editor	Emmanuel Bourdieu	
2006	Le Cri	Lulu	Hervé Baslé	TV Mini-Series
2006	Les inséparables	Mariette	Élisabeth Rappeneau	TV Series (2 episodes)
2007	Anna M.	Anna's mother	Michel Spinosa	
2007	Sur le fil	Madame Langlois	Frédéric Berthe	TV Series (1 episode)
2008	Séraphine	Madame Duphot	Martin Provost	
2009	Someone I Loved	Geneviève	Zabou Breitman	
2009	Mademoiselle Chambon	Véronique's mother	Stéphane Brizé	
2009	Fausses innocences	Madeleine Muller	André Chandelle	TV Movie
2009	La louve	Adeline Jussac	Bruno Bontzolakis	TV Series (2 episodes)
2010	Happy Few	Franck's mother	Antony Cordier	
2010	The Clink of Ice	Evguenia's mother	Bertrand Blier	
2010	En chantier, monsieur Tanner!	Tanner's mother	Stefan Liberski	TV Movie
2010	La commanderie	The widow	Didier Le Pêcheur	TV Mini-Series
2010	Marion Mazzano	Madeleine Liancourt	Marc Angelo	TV Mini-Series
2011	Blood from a Stone	Madame Beaubery	Jacques Maillot	
2012	Bowling	Madame Escoffier	Marie-Castille Mention-Schaar	
2013	Post partum	Carole	Delphine Noels	
2013	La pièce manquante	Armande	Nicolas Birkenstock	
2014	Tiens-toi droite	The administration woman	Katia Lewkowicz	
2014	Un illustre inconnu	Hélène Nicolas	Matthieu Delaporte	
2014	Once in a Lifetime	Yvette	Marie-Castille Mention-Schaar	
2016	La mère à boire	The mother	Laurence Côte	Short
2016	The law of Simon	Christine	Didier Le Pêcheur	TV Series (1 episode)
2017	The House by the Sea	Suzanne	Robert Guédiguian	
2017	Sources assassines	Simone Cazal	Bruno Bontzolakis	TV Movie
2018	Sous la peau	Madame Mouret	Didier Le Pêcheur	TV Mini-Series
2020	A Good Man	Jeannette	Marie-Castille Mention-Schaar	
2021	Full Time	Madame Lusigny	Éric Gravel	
2021	Compagnons	Elise Germain	François Favrat	
2021	Ils sont vivants	Josy	Jérémie Elkaïm	
2022	La dégustation	Danièle Le Bris	Ivan Calbérac	

== Theater ==
Year	Title	Author	Director
1967	The Last Ones	Maxim Gorky	Jean Dasté
1969	Avoir	Julius Hay	Pierre Vial
1969	The Beggar's Opera	John Gay	Chattie Salaman
1971	Le camp du drap d'or	Serge Rezvani	Jean-Pierre Vincent
1971	Capitaine Schelle, Capitaine Eçço	Serge Rezvani	Jean-Pierre Vincent
1972-73	In the Jungle of Cities	Bertolt Brecht	André Engel, Jean Jourdheuil & Jean-Pierre Vincent
1973	Le Cochon noir	Roger Planchon	Jacques Rosner
1974	The Owners of the Keys	Milan Kundera	Georges Werler
1975	Cock-a-Doodle Dandy	Seán O'Casey	Guy Rétoré
1979-81	L'Atelier	Jean-Claude Grumberg	Maurice Bénichou, Jean-Claude Grumberg & Jacques Rosner
1985	Un drôle de cadeau	Jean Bouchaud	Jean Bouchaud
1987	Entre passions et prairie	Denise Bonal	Guy Rétoré
1988	Three Sisters	Anton Chekhov	Maurice Bénichou
1990	Zone libre	Jean-Claude Grumberg	Maurice Bénichou
2006	Hôtel Dorothy Parker	Valeria Moretti & Rachel Salik	Rachel Salik
2007	The Mother	Hanif Kureishi	Didier Bezace
2010	La Médaille	Lydie Salvayre	Zabou Breitman
2011	Mystery of the Rose Bouquet	Manuel Puig	Gilberte Tsaï
2012	Un soir, une ville...	Daniel Keene	Didier Bezace
2020	Du ciel tombaient des animaux	Caryl Churchill	Marc Paquien
