= Olivia Côte =

French actress

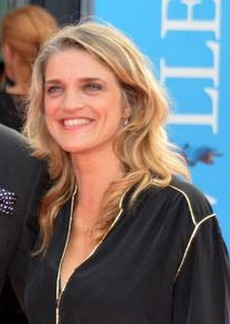
- Born: 12 November 1974 (age 51); Suresnes, Hauts-de-Seine, France
- Occupation: Actress
- Years active: 1998–present

Olivia Côte is a French actress.

== Filmography ==
=== Cinema ===
| Year | Title | Role | Director | Notes |
|---|---|---|---|---|
| 1998 | Mounir et Anita | | Mabrouk El Mechri | Short |
| 2003 | La petite chambre | | Elodie Monlibert | Short |
| 2007 | Infrarouge | | Lionel Mougin | Short |
| 2008 | Born in 68 | Bernadette | Olivier Ducastel & Jacques Martineau | |
| 2009 | Quatuor | | Jérôme Bonnell | Short |
| 2009 | Marcher | The stroller woman | Jeanne Herry | Short |
| 2010 | Ensemble, c'est trop | Charlène | Léa Fazer | |
| 2011 | Au cas où je n'aurais pas la palme d'or | The CNC girl | Renaud Cohen | |
| 2012 | Hénaut président | Charly | Michel Muller | |
| 2012 | Et nous qui sommes paralysés | Sandrine | Sylvain Coisne | Short |
| 2013 | Bright Days Ahead | Lydia | Marion Vernoux | |
| 2013 | Dans la famille... je voudrais | The sister | Coco Tassel | Short |
| 2014 | Les gazelles | Véro | Mona Achache | |
| 2014 | Quantum Love | Caro | Lisa Azuelos | |
| 2014 | Number One Fan | Coline | Jeanne Herry | |
| 2014 | Never on the First Night | TV host | Melissa Drigeard | |
| 2014 | La cravate et le mur | Jacqueline | Aki Yamamoto | Short |
| 2015 | Cerise | Pascale | Jérôme Enrico | |
| 2016 | The Aquatic Effect | Corinne | Sólveig Anspach | |
| 2016 | News from Planet Mars | Fabienne Mars | Dominik Moll | |
| 2017 | Primaire | Marlène Peillard | Hélène Angel | |
| 2017 | Baby Bumps | Cécile | Noémie Saglio | |
| 2017 | Embrasse-moi ! | Monique | Océan & Cyprien Vial | |
| 2017 | Cléo | The mother | Julie Navarro | Short |
| 2018 | Larguées | Lily | Eloïse Lang | |
| 2018 | In Safe Hands | Lydie | Jeanne Herry | |
| 2018 | All About Mothers | Nathalie | Marie-Castille Mention-Schaar | |
| 2019 | Chamboultout | Emmanuelle | Éric Lavaine | |
| 2019 | Moi, maman, ma mère et moi | Juliette Mounier | Christophe Le Masne | |
| 2020 | My Donkey, My Lover & I | Eléonore Loubier | Caroline Vignal | |
| 2021 | The Rose Maker | Véra | Pierre Pinaud | |
| 2021 | Betta | Catherine | Eléonore Wismes | Short |
| 2022 | Pétaouchnok | Sophie | Edouard Deluc | |
| 2022 | Kung Fu Zohra | Marion's mother | Mabrouk El Mechri | |
| 2022 | Le temps des secrets | Madame de Montmajour | Christophe Barratier | |
| 2022 | Les vertueuses | Dr. Adler | Stéphanie Halfon | Short |
| 2023 | Les Cyclades | Blandine Bouvier | Marc Fitoussi | |
| 2023 | Sexygénaires | The photographer | Robin Sykes | |
| 2023 | Monsieur, le Maire | The minister | Karine Blanc & Michel Tavares | |
| 2023 | Iris et les hommes | The mother | Caroline Vignal | |
| 2023 | La tête dans les étoiles | Eva | Emmanuel Gillibert | |
| 2023 | RIP Madame Joseph | | Florence Fauquet & Marie Petiot | Short |

=== Television ===
| Year | Title | Role | Director | Notes |
|---|---|---|---|---|
| 2006 | Sable noir | Jeanne | Eric Valette | TV series (1 episode) |
| 2007–2016 | WOMEN! | Various | Christian Merret-Palmair, David Lanzmann, ... | TV series (432 episodes) |
| 2011 | Un film sans... | | Ronan Sinquin | TV series (3 episodes) |
| 2011 | Zak | Babette | Arthur Benzaquen & Fabrice Laffont | TV series (12 episodes) |
| 2014 | La dernière échappée | Pauline | Fabien Onteniente | TV movie |
| 2014 | WorkinGirls | Carole | Sylvain Fusée | TV series (1 episode) |
| 2014-15 | Hôtel de la plage | Marine | Christian Merret-Palmair | TV series (12 episodes) |
| 2015 | La clinique du docteur H | Joséphine | Olivier Barma | TV movie |
| 2015 | Call My Agent! | Armelle Borzek | Antoine Garceau | TV series (1 episode) |
| 2015 | Peplum | Galla | Philippe Lefebvre | TV series (12 episodes) |
| 2015-17 | Marjorie | Cécile | Mona Achache | TV series (2 episodes) |
| 2016 | Accused | Elizabeth Caussier | Mona Achache | TV series (1 episode) |
| 2018-20 | Skam France | The nurse | David Hourrègue | TV series (2 episodes) |
| 2020 | Ronde de nuit | Gladys | Isabelle Czajka | TV movie |
| 2020 | Derby Girl | Vivianne | Nikola Lange | TV series (2 episodes) |
| 2020 | Les copains d'abord | Julie Binarelli | Denis Imbert | TV series (6 episodes) |
| 2020-23 | César Wagner | Élise Beaumont | Antoine Garceau, Bruno Garcia, ... | TV series (9 episodes) |
| 2021 | Or de lui | Marie | Baptiste Lorber | TV mini-series |
| 2021 | Mensonges | Morgane Artaud | Lionel Bailliu & Stéphanie Murat | TV mini-series |
| 2021 | Les Petits Meurtres d'Agatha Christie | Cassandre | Alexandre Coffre | TV series (1 episode) |
| 2023 | En terrasse | Patricia | Florence Fauquet | TV series (2 episodes) |

=== Writer ===
| Year | Title | Director | Notes |
|---|---|---|---|
| 2007-16 | WOMEN! | Christian Merret-Palmair & David Lanzmann | TV series (290 episodes) |

== Theater ==
| Year | Title | Author | Director |
|---|---|---|---|
| 2003 | On ne badine pas avec l’amour | Alfred de Musset | Isabelle Ronayette |
| 2003-04 | Le Cadavre vivant | Leo Tolstoy | Julie Brochen |
| 2003-05 | Le Dragon | Evguéni Schwartz | Christophe Rauck |
| 2004 | Kroum, l’ectoplasme | Hanoch Levin | Clément Poirée |
| 2013 | Les Bulles | Claire Castillon | Marion Vernoux |
| 2015-17 | Pédagogies de l’échec | Pierre Notte | Alain Timár |
| 2016 | La Stratégie d’Alice | Aristophane | Emmanuel Daumas |
| 2020 | Un amour de jeunesse | Ivan Calbérac | Ivan Calbérac |
