= Noémie Merlant =

French actress (born 1988)

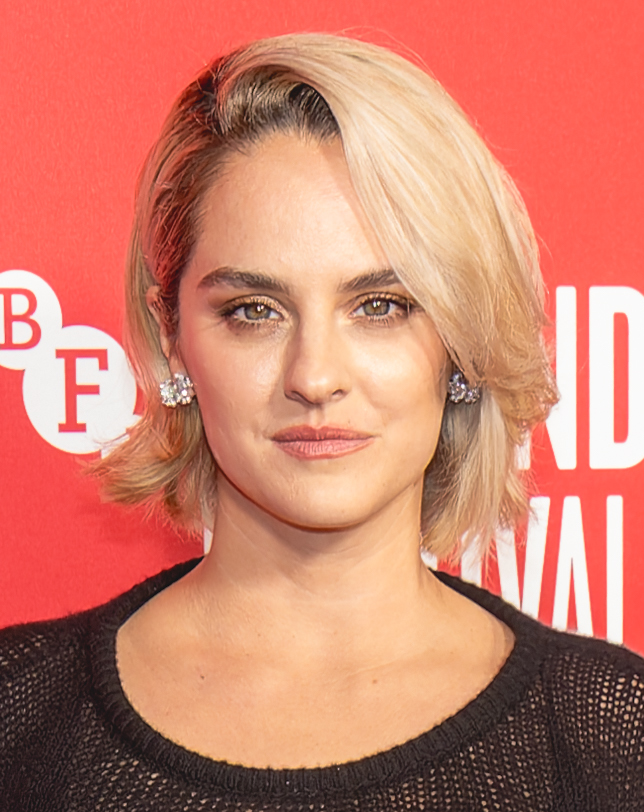
- Merlant in 2024
- Born: 27 November 1988 (age 37); Paris, France
- Occupations: Actress, filmmaker
- Years active: 2008–present

Noémie Merlant (French: [nɔemi mɛʁlɑ̃]; born 27 November 1988) is a French actress and filmmaker. She has been nominated for her performances three times at the César Awards, including a nomination for her breakout role in Portrait of a Lady on Fire (2019) and a win for The Innocent (2022).

== Career ==
Merlant was born on 27 November 1988 in Paris. Both of her parents are real estate agents. She was raised in Rezé near Nantes.

Merlant began her career as a professional model before attending the Cours Florent acting school in Paris.

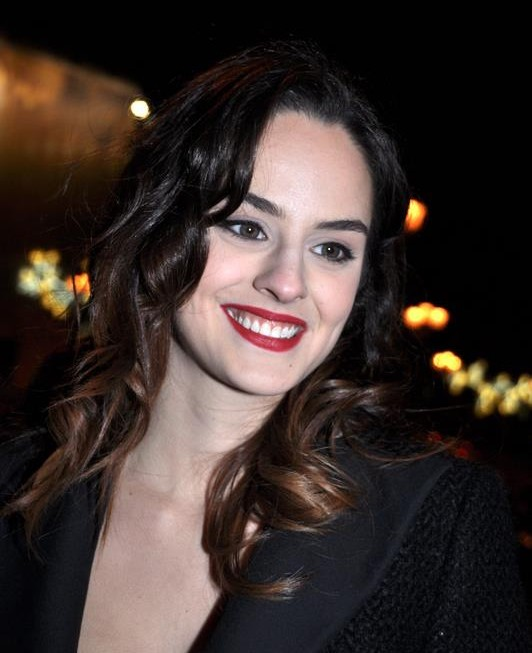
Merlant in 2013

She had her first breakthrough in the 2016 film Heaven Will Wait for which she was nominated for the César Award for Most Promising Actress.

In 2019, Merlant starred in Portrait of a Lady on Fire. She won the Lumière Award for Best Actress for her performance and was nominated for the César Award for Best Actress alongside her co-star Adèle Haenel.

In 2020, Merlant starred in Zoé Wittock's Jumbo, a film about a woman who falls in love with an amusement park ride. She also starred in Marie-Castille Mention-Schaar's A Good Man.

In 2022, Merlant portrayed Francesca Lentini, a musician and personal assistant to the celebrated composer/conductor Lydia Tár (Cate Blanchett), in Todd Field's Tár.

In 2023, it was announced that Merlant would play the titular character Emmanuelle in a reboot of the iconic franchise directed by Audrey Diwan.

In June 2023, Merlant was invited to become a member of the Academy of Motion Picture Arts and Sciences.

In April 2025, she joined the cast of Bertrand Mandico's upcoming film Roma Elastica.

=== Directing ===
Merlant has directed two short films, the 2017 film Je suis #unebiche and the 2019 film Shakira. In 2021, she made her feature directorial debut with Mi Iubita Mon Amour, which premiered at the 2021 Cannes Film Festival. Her sophomore directorial effort, The Balconettes, premiered at the 2024 Cannes Film Festival.

== Filmography ==
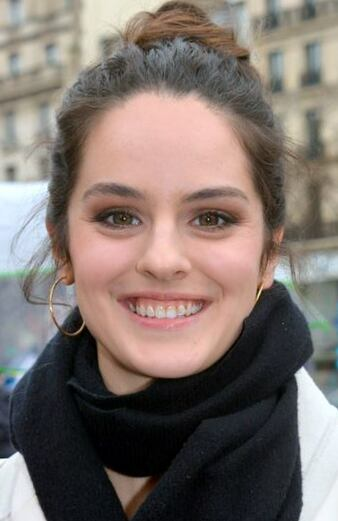
Noémie Merlant (2017)

=== Feature films ===
Key
†	Denotes films that have not yet been released

Year	Title	Role	Notes
2008	Death in Love		Uncredited
2011	La Permission de minuit	Mathilde	
2011	L'Orpheline avec en plus un bras en moins	Éléonore	
2014	La Crème de la crème	The Redhead	
2014	Des lendemains qui chantent	Svetlana	
2014	Once in a Lifetime	Mélanie	
2015	One Wild Moment	Linda	
2015	Newcomer	Anja	
2016	Dieumerci!	Audrey	
2016	The Brother	Claire	
2016	Twisting Fate	Claire	
2016	Heaven Will Wait	Sonia Bouzaria	Nominated—César Award for Most Promising Actress; Nominated—Lumière Award for Best Female Revelation
2017	Plonger	The Young Artist	
2018	Return of the Hero	Pauline Beaugrand	
2018	All About Mothers	Coco	
2018	Paper Flags	Charlie	
2019	Curiosa	Marie de Régnier	
2019	Portrait of a Lady on Fire	Marianne	Lumière Award for Best Actress; Nominated - César Award for Best Actress
2019	République	Nora	Interactive film
2020	Jumbo	Jeanne Tantois	
2020	A Good Man	Benjamin	
2021	Mi Iubita Mon Amour	Jeanne	Also director, producer and writer
2021	Paris, 13th District	Nora Ligier	
2022	One Year, One Night	Céline	Nominated – Gaudí Award for Best Actress
2022	The Innocent	Clemence	César Award for Best Supporting Actress
2022	Tár	Francesca Lentini	Hollywood debut
2022	Baby Ruby	Jo	
2023	A Difficult Year	Valentine "Cactus"	
2023	Soul Mates	Jeanne	
2023	Lee	Nusch Éluard	
2024	The Balconettes	Élise	Also director and writer
2024	Emmanuelle	Emmanuelle	
2025	Duse	Enrichetta Checci	
2026	Roma Elastica	Valentina	
2026	Les Misérables †	Fantine	Completed
TBA	The Thing That Hurts †		Post-production

=== Short films ===
Year	Title	Role	Notes
2010	Parigi		
2011	Juste avant l'aube	Laura	
2012	Les Nerfs fument		
2013	Pour le rôle	The Secretary	
2013	Lapsus	Angie	
2013	Némésis	Ange	
2013	Le Devoir	Agnes	
2013	L'Amour a la clé		
2017	Unexpected	Agnès	
2017	Je suis #unebiche		Also director and writer
2019	Shakira	Shakira	Also director and writer

=== Television ===
Year	Title	Role	Notes
2011	Le Jour où tout a basculé	Annabelle	Episode: "Ma fille est amoureuse de son professeur"
2012	Julie Lescaut	Lou de Salle	Episode: "Cougar"
2012	Enquêtes réservées	Garance Lasarthe	Episode: "Un témoin de trop"
2013	Dos au mur		TV series
2014	Le Voyage de monsieur Perrichon	Henriette	TV film
2016	Elles... Les Filles du Plessis	Brigitte	TV film
2016	The Law of ...	Katya Valle	Episode: "Christophe's Law: La ligne blanche"
2021	H24		Episode: "17h - PLS"

== Theatre ==
Year	Title	Director
2008	Adriana Mater	Bertrand Dégremont
2010	Push Up	Suzanne Marot
2011	Les Lésions dangereuses	Julia Dunoyer

== Discography ==
=== Singles ===
- "Fate" (2016)
