= Catherine Davydzenka =

French actress

- Born: 2 May 1998 (age 27); Paris, France
- Occupations: Actress; model
- Years active: 2011–present
- Known for: Ici tout commence
- Height: 1.72 m (5 ft 8 in)

Catherine Davydzenka (born 2 May 1998), is a French actress.

== Childhood and beginnings ==
Catherine Davydzenka started acting at the age of 11. At the age of 12, she was spotted by Matthieu Gautier who offered her a role in his film Les raclures.

== Career ==
In 2020, she joined the cast of the daily series Ici tout commence, broadcast on TF1. Besides acting, Davydzenka is also a model. She is chosen as a model for Yves Saint-Laurent and Franck Provost. She participates in the Fashion Week.

== Private life ==
She is of Belarusian origin.

== Filmography ==
=== Television ===
- 2015 : Les raclures: Olga
- 2017 : Like Me (Disney Channel)
- 2020 : Le bureau des légendes
- Since 2020: Ici tout commence : Hortense Rochemont

=== Cinema ===
- 2018: Mon bébé by Liza Azuelos
- 2019 : La Vérité si je mens les débuts
