= Henri de Régnier =

French poet (1864–1936)

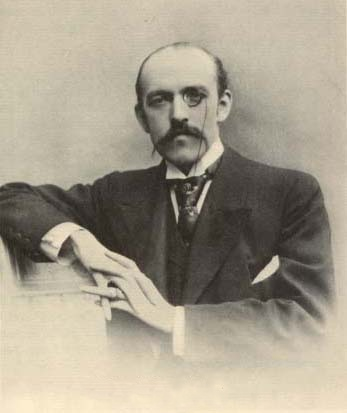
- Régnier before 1900
- Born: 28 December 1864; Honfleur, France
- Died: 23 May 1936 (aged 71); Paris, France
- Resting place: Père Lachaise Cemetery
- Occupations: Poet; novelist
- Spouse: Marie de Régnier
- Writing career
- Language: French
- Movement: Symbolism

Signature
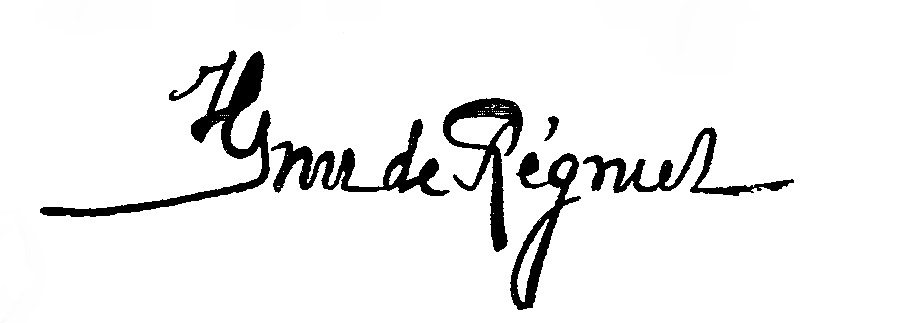

Henri-François-Joseph de Régnier (French pronunciation: [ɑ̃ʁi fʁɑ̃swa ʒozɛf də ʁeɲe]; 28 December 1864 – 23 May 1936) was a French symbolist poet, considered one of the most important of France during the early 20th century.

== Life and works ==
He was born in Honfleur (Calvados) on 28 December 1864, and educated in Paris for law. In 1885 he began to contribute to the Parisian reviews, and his verses were published by most of the French and Belgian periodicals favorable to the symbolist writers. Having begun as a Parnassian, he retained the classical tradition, though he adopted some of the innovations of Jean Moréas and Gustave Kahn. His vaguely suggestive style shows the influence of Stéphane Mallarmé, of whom he was an assiduous disciple.

His first volume of poems, Lendemains, appeared in 1885, and among numerous later volumes are Poèmes anciens et romanesques (1890), Les Jeux rustiques et divins (1890), Les Médailles d'argile (1900), La Cité des eaux (1903). He is also the author of a series of realistic novels and tales, among which are La Canne de jaspe (2nd ed., 1897), La Double maîtresse (5th ed., 1900), Les Vacances d’un jeune homme sage (1903), and Les Amants singuliers (1905). Régnier married Marie de Heredia, daughter of the poet José María de Heredia, and herself a novelist and poet under the pen name of Gérard d'Houville.

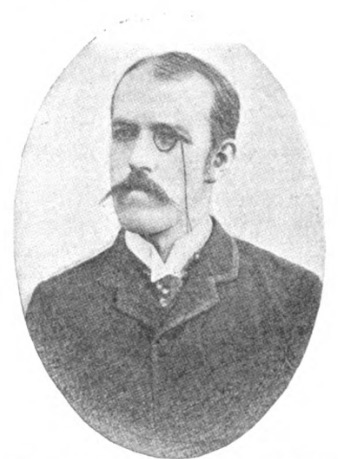
Henri de Régnier in April 1895 edition of The Bookman (New York City)

He was a contributor to Le Visage de l'Italie, a 1929 book about Italy prefaced by Benito Mussolini.

La Canne de jaspe and Histoires Incertaines (1919) were translated in 2012 by Brian Stableford under the title A Surfeit of Mirrors ISBN 978-1-61227-076-0

Henri de Régnier died in 1936 at age 71 and was interred in the Père Lachaise Cemetery in Paris.

== Other media ==
- An edition of Maurice Ravel's waltz Valses nobles et sentimentales was published with a quotation from de Régnier "…le plaisir délicieux et toujours nouveau d'une occupation inutile"
- In the introductory cutscene to the 2012 video game Dragon's Dogma by Capcom, the quotation "le plaisir délicieux... d'une occupation inutile" (subtitled trans. "The delightful and ever-novel pleasure of a useless occupation.") is given and attributed to de Régnier himself.

== Film ==
- 2019 : Curiosa, Lou Jeunet's French movie.
