= The Balconettes =

2024 film by Noémie Merlant

- Theatrical release poster
- French: Les Femmes au balcon
- Directed by: Noémie Merlant
- Written by: Noémie Merlant; Céline Sciamma
- Produced by: Pierre Guyard
- Starring: Souheila Yacoub; Sanda Codreanu; Noémie Merlant; Lucas Bravo; Nadège Beausson-Diagne; Christophe Montenez
- Cinematography: Evgenia Alexandrova
- Edited by: Julien Lacheray
- Music by: Uèle Lamore
- Production companies: Nord-Ouest Films; France 2 Cinéma
- Distributed by: Tandem
- Release dates: 19 May 2024 (Cannes); 11 December 2024 (France)
- Running time: 105 minutes
- Country: France
- Language: French
- Budget: €3.5 million
- Box office: $455,756

The Balconettes (French: Les Femmes au balcon) is a 2024 French comedy horror film directed by, co-written by, and starring Noémie Merlant. The film, which co-stars Souheila Yacoub and Sanda Codreanu, follows three young women during a heatwave in the south of France.

The film premiered in the Midnight Screenings section at the 77th Cannes Film Festival on 19 May 2024, where it competed for the Queer Palm.

== Plot ==
In a 46-degree heat wave in Marseille, three friends – Nicole (an aspiring writer working on a story about a shy woman’s affair with her neighbor), webcam model Ruby, and the careless Elise (an actress still in character as Marilyn Monroe, in a complicated relationship with lawyer Paul) – languish in an apartment, watching from the balcony as they fantasize about their mysterious neighbor across the street. After a minor accident involving Elise, the neighbor invites the girls over. A drunken evening takes place in his apartment, which also doubles as a photo studio. When Elise and Nicole go to bed, Ruby stays for the photo shoot. A few hours later, she returns, half-conscious and covered in blood – having accidentally killed the neighbor during an attempted rape. In the morning, Ruby is still unable to speak. Returning to the crime scene, the friends discover a horrific scene: Magnani's body is hanging on a pole with part of his genitals missing. They begin cleaning up, hiding the body in the freezer (Nicole finds the missing part and temporarily places it in a food container). Paul stalks Elise, who turns out to be pregnant, and rapes her in a hotel; Nicole begins to be haunted by the ghosts of the rapists, including the spirit of the murdered neighbor.

Ruby tells her friends about what Magnani did to her. The women get rid of the body by dismembering it, placing it in two suitcases and throwing it into the ocean. Elise has an abortion and leaves Paul. Nicole makes the ghosts admit their guilt and disappear. At the end friends walk through the city, where more and more women take to the streets with bare breasts, celebrating their new life.

== Cast ==
- Souheila Yacoub as Ruby
- Sanda Codreanu as Nicole
- Noémie Merlant as Élise
- Lucas Bravo as Magnani
- Nadège Beausson-Diagne as Denise
- Christophe Montenez as Paul
- Henri Cohen as Doctor

== Production ==
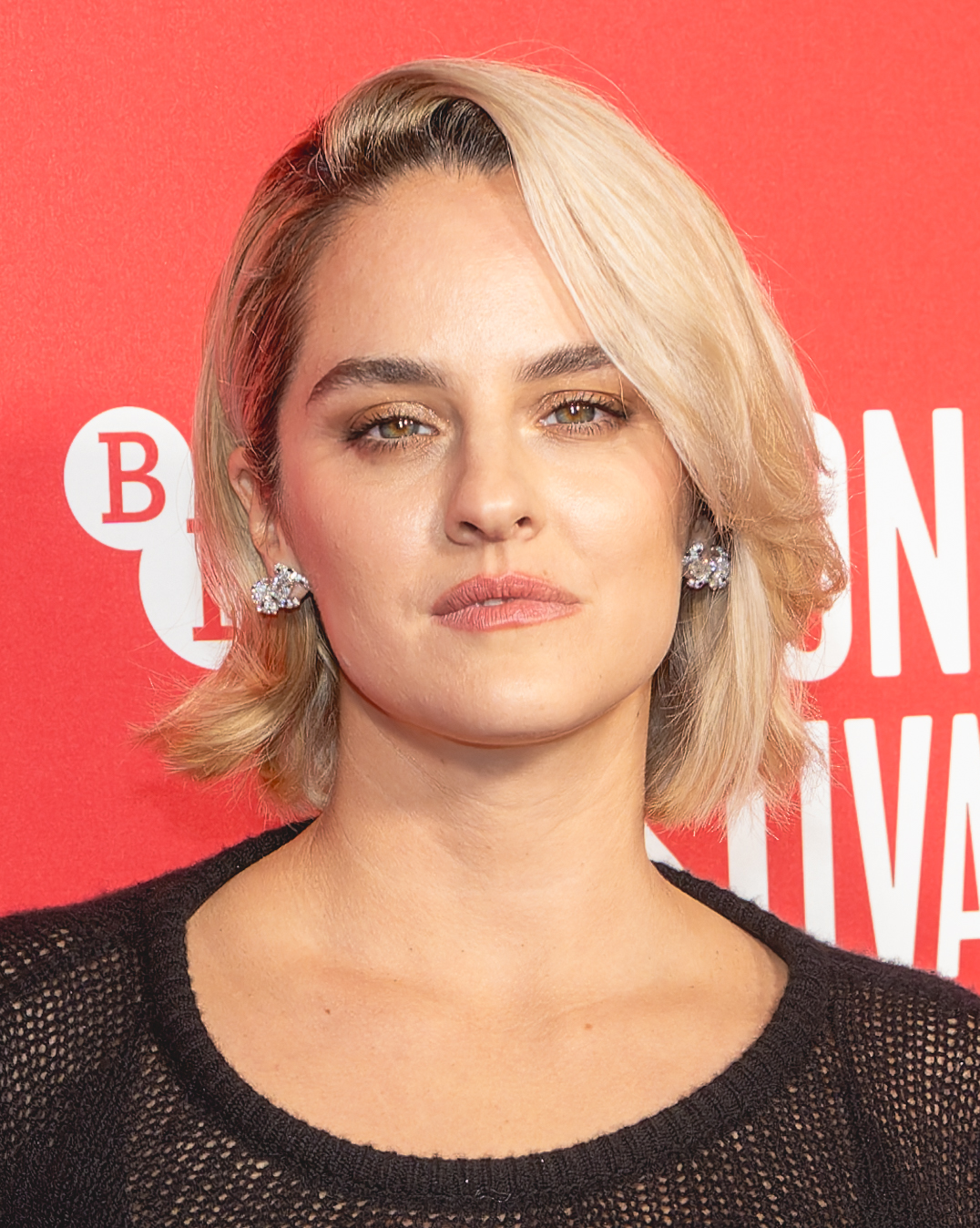
Noémie Merlant (2024)

The Balconettes is the second feature film directed (and co-written) by Noémie Merlant, who is primarily known as an actress, following her award-winning debut film Mi Iubita Mon Amour (2021). Merlant wrote the screenplay in collaboration with Céline Sciamma, who previously directed Merlant in her 2019 historical drama film Portrait of a Lady on Fire. The Balconettes was touted in advance as "bloody, punk and exhilarating" and as a "comedy horror". Pierre Guyard produced the film for Nord-Ouest Films, a role which he had previously undertaken on Mi Iubita Mon Amour. Merlant decided to take on one of the main roles, as in her directorial debut, alongside Souheila Yacoub and Sanda Codreanu. Codreanu had also previously been entrusted with a larger role in Mi Iubita Mon Amour.

Filming was originally scheduled to begin in August 2023. Due to an impending filming conflict with Audrey Diwan's film project Emmanuelle, in which Merlant had been given the title role, the start of filming was brought forward to July. Principal photography began on 10 July 2023 in Marseille and took place there for seven weeks. The project was financially supported by the government film funding agency CNC, as well as by Canal+ and France Télévisions. The production costs were given as 3.5 million euros.

== Release ==
The Balconettes was selected to be screened out of competition in the Midnight Screenings section at the 77th Cannes Film Festival, where it had its world premiere on 19 May 2024. It will also be showcased at the 53rd Norwegian International Film Festival in Main the section on 16 August 2025.

The film was originally set to be released theatrically in France by Tandem on 4 September 2024, but the release date was pushed back to 11 December 2024. International sales are handled by mk2 Films.

== Reception ==
=== Critical response ===
On the review aggregator website Rotten Tomatoes, 76% of 45 critics' reviews are positive. Metacritic, which uses a weighted average, assigned the film a score of 67 out of 100, based on 10 critics, indicating "generally favorable" reviews.

David Ehrlich of IndieWire gave the film a 'B+' score, describing it as a "poisoned but delicious midnight snack of a second feature" for Merlant.

Leslie Felperin of The Hollywood Reporter lamented that the film is "less a bold sui generis experiment than a hot mess".

Guy Lodge of Variety likened the directorial energy channelled in the film to that of early Pedro Almodóvar.

=== Accolades ===
Award	Date of ceremony	Category	Recipient(s)	Result	Ref.
Cannes Film Festival	25 May 2024	Queer Palm	Noémie Merlant	Nominated	
