= Vous les femmes =

'Vous les femmes may refer to:

- Vous les femmes (TV series), French series (English title WOMEN!)
- "Vous les femmes" (song), commonly known title of the Julio Iglesias song "Pauvres Diables"
