= Curiosa =

Curiosa may refer to:

- Curiosa (erotica), erotica and pornography as discrete, collectable items, usually in published or printed form
- Curiosa (film), a 2019 French film directed by Lou Jeunet, with actress Amira Casar
- Curiosa Festival, a 2004 concert tour by the English rock band The Cure
