= Così fan tutte (TV series) =

- Genre: Sketch comedy; Sitcom
- Starring: Alessia Marcuzzi; Debora Villa
- Country of origin: Italy
- No. of seasons: 2
- No. of episodes: 30

Original release
- Network: Italia 1
- Release: September 7, 2009 – January 18, 2012

Così fan tutte is an Italian sketch comedy, based on the French sketch comedy WOMEN!. It stars Alessia Marcuzzi and Debora Villa in the leading roles.

== See also ==
- List of Italian television series
