= All About Mothers =

2018 French film by Marie-Castille Mention-Schaar

- French: La Fête des mères
- Directed by: Marie-Castille Mention-Schaar
- Written by: Marie-Castille Mention-Schaar
- Produced by: Marie-Castille Mention-Schaar; Pierre Kubel; Willow Films; Vendredi Film; France 2 Cinéma
- Starring: Audrey Fleurot; Clotilde Courau; Olivia Côte; Pascale Arbillot; Carmen Maura; Nicole Garcia; Marie-Christine Barrault; Gustave Kervern; Noémie Merlant
- Cinematography: Myriam Vinocour
- Edited by: Benoît Quinon
- Music by: Ronan Maillard
- Release date: 23 May 2018
- Running time: 101 minutes
- Country: France
- Language: French
- Budget: $6.4 million
- Box office: $922.351

All About Mothers (French: La Fête des mères, lit. 'Mother's Day') is a 2018 French film written, directed and produced by Marie-Castille Mention-Schaar.

== Cast ==
- Audrey Fleurot as Anne
- Clotilde Courau as Daphné
- Olivia Côte as Nathalie
- Pascale Arbillot as Isabelle
- Jeanne Rosa as Blanche
- Carmen Maura as Thérèse
- Nicole Garcia as Ariane
- Vincent Dedienne as Stan
- Marie-Christine Barrault as Jacqueline
- Pascal Demolon as Jacques
- Gustave Kervern as Grégoire
- Noémie Merlant as Coco
- Mehdi Boudina as Fred
- Lolita Chammah as Dominique
- Nicole Ferroni as Sylvie
- Xavier Maly as Charles
- Sabine Pakora as Housewife

== Production ==
The shooting of the film began on September 21, 2017. For the scenes shot at the Élysée Palace, President Emmanuel Macron and Élysée officials agreed to lend the hallway and the courtyard. President François Hollande had allowed director Mention-Schaar to visit his private apartments before he left office. Having realized these were Haussmann-style apartments, Mention-Schaar found smaller similar apartments for the shooting. The desk was recreated in a Paris hôtel particulier with a decorum similar to Élysée's.
