= Ernest Jean-Marie Millard de Bois Durand =

French painter

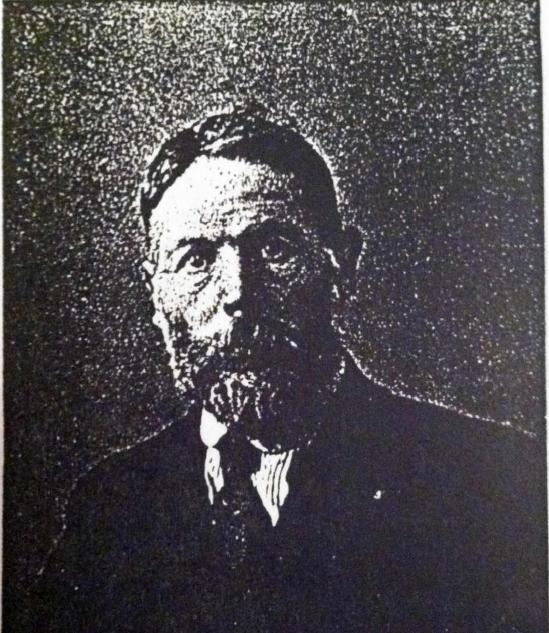
- Born: 29 July 1872; Paris, France
- Died: 18 January 1946 (aged 73)
- Known for: Painting

Ernest Jean-Marie Millard de Bois Durand (29 July 1872 – 18 January 1946) was a painter, watercolorist and illustrator born in Paris. He was a professor of drawing and artistic anatomy at the École Boulle.

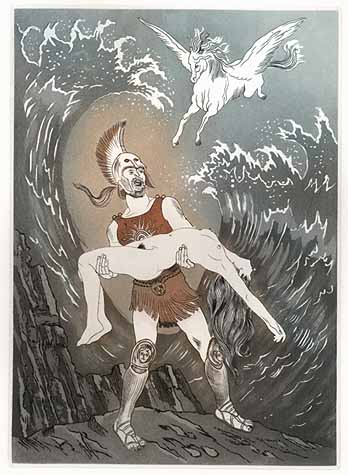
Watercolor by Ernest Millard de Bois Durand for Trophées

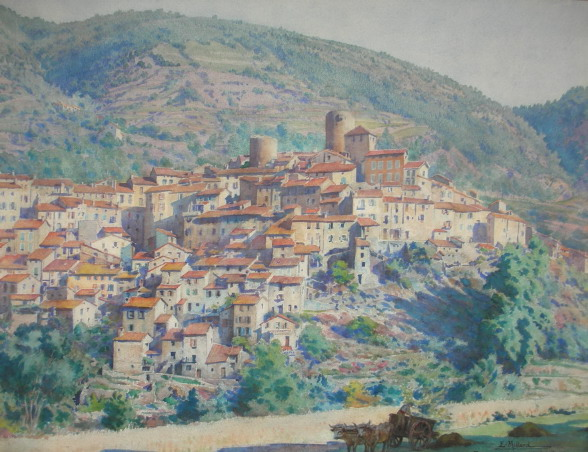
View of the village of Palalda by Ernest Millard de Bois Durand

== Illustrated books ==
- Les Trophées (J.-M. de Hérédia) single copy
- Cyrano de Bergerac (Rostand Ed)
- Cléopâtre (H. Houssaye)

== Lithographs ==
- Marguerite d'York
- Sphynx

== Main table ==
- La Bièvre aux Gobelins
- Le marché de Laruns
- Vallée bretonne
- Interieur Limousin
- Saint Sébastien
- La sorcière
- La femme au sofa

== Watercolors ==
- Le Monte Generoso
- Les sapins de Stockholm
- Foire de Fribourg
- Bords de la Sarthe
- Les gorges du Guiel sous Montdauphin
- Les gorges d'Ailefroide près de Vallouise (Hautes Alpes)
- Le Hameau d'Ailefroide (Hautes Alpes)
- Le marché sous les remparts de Fougères (Iles et Vilaine)
- Fougères, le marché sur la Place Lariboisière (gift of the artist, Hôtel de ville de Fougères)
- La chaumière limousine
- Autoportrait (collection of the family Millard de Bois Durand)
- Palada, Pyrénées-Orientales vue du pont du chemin de fer (collection of the family Millard de Bois Durand)
- Cancale, le Port de la houle
- Le retour du troupeau
- Village en montagne (Hautes Alpes)
