= Quantum Love =

- Theatrical release poster
- Directed by: Lisa Azuelos
- Written by: Lisa Azuelos
- Produced by: Lisa Azuelos; Florian Genetet-Morel; Christopher Granier-Deferre; Romain Le Grand; Julien Madon
- Starring: Sophie Marceau; François Cluzet
- Cinematography: Alain Duplantier
- Edited by: Stan Collet
- Production companies: Bethsabée Mucho; Pathé; TF1 Films Production; Chaocorp Développement; Movie Pictures
- Distributed by: Pathé
- Release date: 23 April 2014 (France)
- Running time: 81 minutes
- Country: France
- Language: French
- Budget: €13.4 million
- Box office: $4.8 million

Quantum Love (French: Une rencontre) is a 2014 French film written and directed by Lisa Azuelos and starring Sophie Marceau and François Cluzet.

== Plot ==
Pierre (François Cluzet) has been happily married for fifteen years and a good father. Still in love with his wife, he enjoys his wife and family and is content. One evening, he meets Elsa (Sophie Marceau) at a party and are immediately attracted to each other. Fifteen days later, they happen to meet again and the mutual attraction turns into infatuation. But his love for his wife and Elsa's rule about not dating married men prevents them from taking the next step. Instead, they fantasize about each other, and soon the fantasies mingle with the reality.

== Cast ==
- Sophie Marceau as Elsa
- François Cluzet as Pierre
- Lisa Azuelos as Anne
- Alexandre Astier as Éric
- Arthur Benzaquen as Julien
- Jonathan Cohen as Marc
- Niels Schneider as Hugo
- Stéphanie Murat as Valérie
- Olivia Côte as Caro
- Syrus Shahidi as Un ami de Julien
- Lily Taieb as Lily
- Jules Benchetrit as Louis
- Tatiana Khayat as Lola
- Stylane Lecaille as Ben
- Thaïs Alessandrin as Jeanne

== Production ==
Quantum Love was filmed in Paris, France.
