= Wah-Wah (film) =

- Theatrical release poster
- Directed by: Richard E. Grant
- Written by: Richard E. Grant
- Produced by: Marie-Castille Mention-Schaar; Jeff Abberley; Pierre Kubel
- Starring: Gabriel Byrne; Emily Watson; Julie Walters; Nicholas Hoult; Miranda Richardson
- Cinematography: Pierre Aim
- Edited by: Isabelle Dedieu
- Music by: Patrick Doyle
- Production companies: Scion Films; IMG Productions; Lorna Nasha; Reeleyes Film
- Distributed by: Lionsgate (United Kingdom); Roadside Attractions; Samuel Goldwyn Films
- Release dates: 17 August 2005 (EIFF); 12 May 2006 (US); 2 June 2006 (UK); 22 June 2006 (AUS)
- Running time: 97 minutes
- Countries: UK; France; South Africa; Swaziland/Eswatini
- Language: English
- Budget: $7 million
- Box office: $2.8 million

Wah-Wah is a 2005 comedy-drama film written and directed by Richard E. Grant in his directorial debut. Loosely based on his childhood in Swaziland, it stars Nicholas Hoult, Gabriel Byrne, Emily Watson, Miranda Richardson and Julie Walters.

Filmed and set in Swaziland, the film was first shown at the Cannes Film Market on 13 May 2005 and premiered at the Edinburgh International Film Festival on 17 August 2005. It then toured to various festivals before receiving a limited release in the United States on 5 May 2006, followed by its release in the United Kingdom on 2 June 2006.

== Plot ==
In this semi-autobiographical tale of his childhood in Swaziland during the last days of the British Empire in Africa in the 1960s, Grant relates the story of Ralph Compton, whose family's disintegration mirrors the end of British rule. After witnessing his mother's adultery with his father's best friend, Ralph must survive not only boarding school but also his beloved father's remarriage to Ruby, a fast-talking American Airlines flight attendant, and his father's gradual descent into alcoholism.

== History ==
=== Development and pre-production ===
Grant initially wrote the film loosely based on his childhood, after a screenwriter recommended he write a screenplay after reading his memoirs of his Withnail and I experiences. The first meeting with a producer took place in 1999 and the film took almost seven years from then to complete. Grant initially had trouble securing actors; Rachel Weisz, Toni Collette, Meg Ryan, Emmanuelle Béart, Ralph Fiennes and Jeremy Irons all turned down roles. Julie Walters was eventually the first actor to be signed. Grant intended for the part of Ralph to be played by two actors but the casting director, Celestia Fox, insisted on one actor. During the casting sessions, Grant noticed the similarity between Zac Fox and Nicholas Hoult and persuaded Celestia Fox to cast them. The part of the father was meant to be younger but, as all the actors asked in that age range passed on the role, an older actor (Gabriel Byrne) was chosen. After the original producer left the project due to a career change, Grant was approached by Marie-Castille Mention-Schaar to produce the project, a decision he later came to regret.

=== Production and aftermath ===
The film was the first to have been shot in Swaziland. Filming began in July 2004 and took place over seven weeks and post-production took place in England and France.

Wah-Wah received its premiere at the Edinburgh International Film Festival and received a special Toronto International Film Festival screening in September 2005. Grant also kept a diary of his experiences of the film, later published as a book, The Wah-Wah Diaries, which was met positively by the critics, many of whom were impressed at the honesty of the tale, especially in regard to his frictional relationship with the "inexperienced" producer. Grant mentioned in subsequent interviews that she was a "control freak out of control" and that he would "never see her again as long as [he] lives". In a BBC interview, he again mentioned his "disastrous" relationship with Mention-Schaar, relating that he received just five emails in the last two months of pre-production from her, that she rarely turned up on the set, and that she failed to obtain clearance for either the song rights or to film in Swaziland (without the knowledge of Grant, who eventually was forced to meet the King of Swaziland to seek clemency).

=== Main cast ===
- Gabriel Byrne as Harry
- Emily Watson as Ruby
- Julie Walters as Gwen
- Nicholas Hoult as Ralph (older)
- Miranda Richardson as Lauren
- Zac Fox as Ralph (younger)
- Celia Imrie as Lady Hardwick
- Julian Wadham as Charles
- Fenella Woolgar as June Broughton
- John Matshikiza as Dr. Zim Mzimba
- Sid Mitchell as Vernon

== Critical reception ==
Critics were split on Wah-Wah. BBC Movies said it was "superbly performed and fluently shot", but lamented its uninteresting subject. David Hughes of Empire magazine said that the film was "an unforced, engaging and surprisingly incisive account of the disintegration of British rule in Africa". Time Out noted that "Gabriel Byrne gives a great performance as Ralph’s troubled father, Harry, and Miranda Richardson and Emily Watson are enjoyable as Harry’s wife and American lover". Variety said that "above all, the film has a wonderful sense of ensemble in the portrayal of its inbred community, and the focus stays tight on the people rather than political events" and The Los Angeles Times said that "Grant opens up his life, not with embarrassment or explanation but with humanity and gratitude. Emotional, melodramatic and sentimental, the film unabashedly wears its heart on its sleeve, and is the better for it." Roger Ebert was less praising, noting that he "admired the movie and was happy to see it but can think of two other films about whites in Africa that do a better job of seeing their roles (Nowhere in Africa and White Mischief)." As of June 2020, the film holds a 54% approval rating on Rotten Tomatoes, based on 69 reviews with an average rating of 5.91/10. The website's critics consensus reads: "The ensemble cast is strong, but they get overpowered by the muddled stew of melodrama."

=== Box office ===
The film received a limited release and only grossed $2.8 million worldwide on a $7 million budget.
