= Once in a Lifetime (2014 film) =

- Film poster
- Directed by: Marie-Castille Mention-Schaar
- Written by: Marie-Castille Mention-Schaar; Ahmed Dramé
- Produced by: Marie-Castille Mention-Schaar; Pierre Kubel
- Starring: Ariane Ascaride; Ahmed Dramé
- Cinematography: Myriam Vinocour
- Edited by: Benoît Quinon
- Music by: Ludovico Einaudi
- Production company: Loma Nasha
- Distributed by: UGC Distribution
- Release dates: 7 October 2014 (FIFF); 3 December 2014 (France)
- Running time: 105 minutes
- Country: France
- Language: French
- Budget: $3.7 million
- Box office: $3.4 million

Once in a Lifetime (original title: Les Héritiers) is a 2014 French drama film directed by Marie-Castille Mention-Schaar.

== Plot ==
Based on a true story, the film chronicles the relationship of a teacher with teenagers who have long since dropped out of the school system. This teacher of Leon Blum high school at Créteil (Val-de-Marne), decides to enter a national competition titled "Children and adolescents in the Nazi concentration camp system". Initially tumultuous and frustrating, the atmosphere quickly evolves as they meet with a survivor of the camps and increasing intensity during a visit to a museum dedicated to this period of history. This experience will change their lives.

== Cast ==
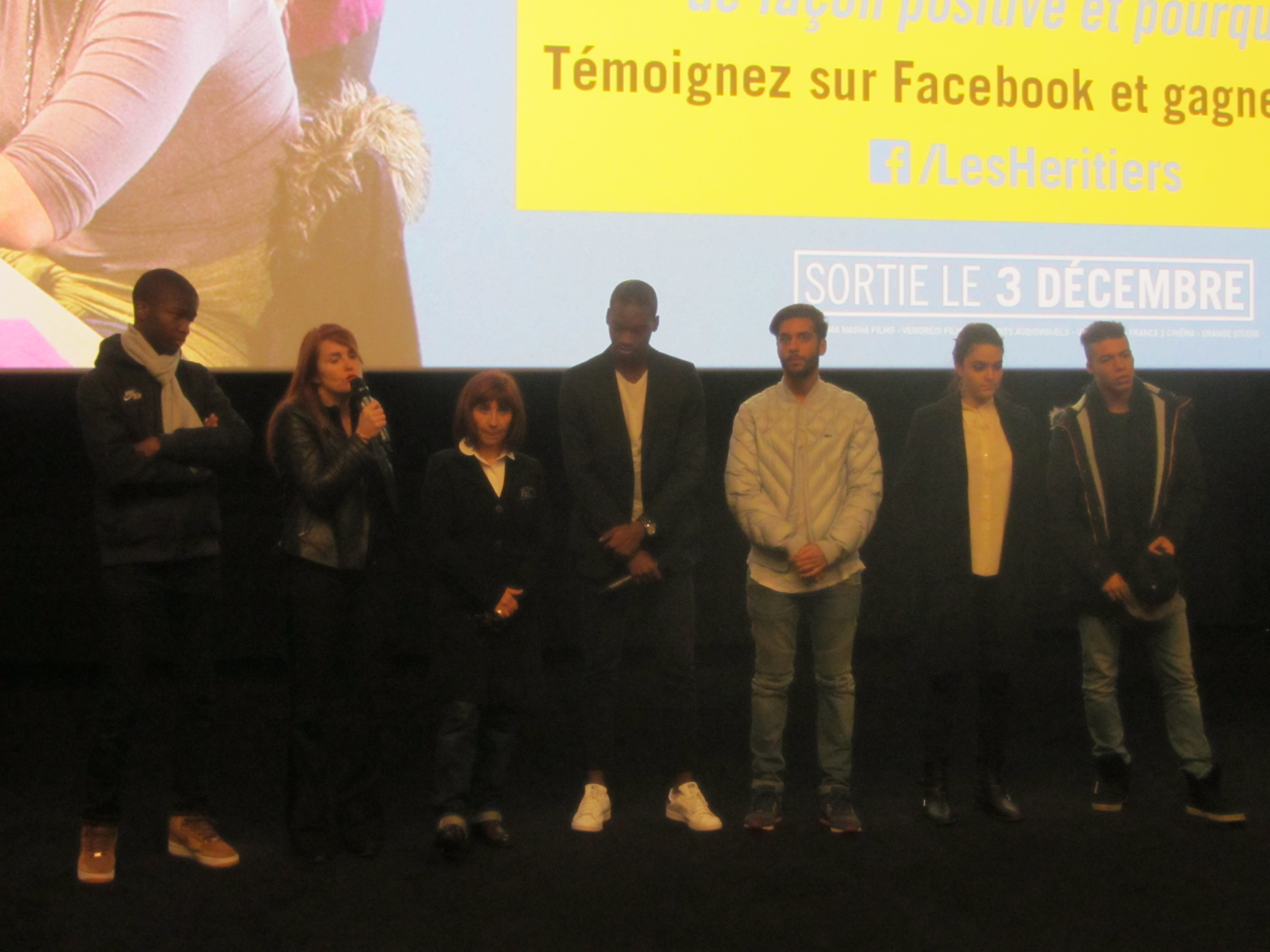
Cast and director at the film premiere in Paris.

- Ariane Ascaride as Anne Gueguen
- Ahmed Dramé as Malik
- Noémie Merlant as Mélanie
- Geneviève Mnich as Yvette
- Stéphane Bak as Max
- Wendy Nieto as Jamila
- Aïmen Derriachi as Saïd
- Mohamed Seddiki as Olivier
- Naomi Amarger as Julie
- Alicia Dadoun as Camélia
- Adrien Hurdubae as Théo
- Raky Sall as Koudjiji
- Amine Lansari as Rudy
- Koro Dramé as Léa
- Xavier Maly as The Principal

== Reception ==
Karen Schollemann called the film on kinocritics.com a "powerful tale about integration".

== Accolades ==
Award / Film Festival	Category	Recipients and nominees	Result
César Awards	Most Promising Actor	Ahmed Dramé	Nominated
St. Louis International Film Festival	Best Narrative Feature		Won
Philadelphia Jewish Film Festival CineMondays 2015	Best Narrative		Won
