= Curiosa (film) =

2019 film

- Directed by: Lou Jeunet
- Screenplay by: Lou Jeunet; Raphaëlle Desplechin
- Produced by: Olivier Delbosc
- Starring: Noémie Merlant; Niels Schneider; Benjamin Lavernhe; Damien Bonnard
- Cinematography: Simon Roca
- Edited by: Anita Roth
- Music by: Arnaud Rebotini
- Production companies: Curiosa Films; Memento Films International; Cinémage 12; Cofinova 14; Canal+; Ciné+; Films Distribution; CNC; Région Ile-de-France; Cofinova Développement; Cinémage 12 Développement
- Distributed by: Memento Films Distribution
- Release date: 3 April 2019
- Running time: 107 minutes
- Country: France
- Language: French

Curiosa is a 2019 French biographical film directed by Lou Jeunet starring Noémie Merlant, Niels Schneider and Benjamin Lavernhe. It is loosely based on the relationship between 19th-century French authors Pierre Louÿs and Marie de Régnier. Pierre Louÿs was an erotomaniac who took erotic or pornographic photographs of his mistresses. Such erotic or even pornographic representations are referred to as 'curiosa', hence the name of the movie.

== Plot ==
The film recounts the relationship between Marie de Régnier (1875–1963) and Pierre Louÿs (1870–1925), which takes place in France around the turn of the 20th century. Pierre Louÿs and his friend Henri de Regnier both fall in love with Marie, daughter of the poet José-Maria de Heredia. Although she loves Pierre, she marries the wealthy Henri to help pay off her father's debt and to improve her social position.

Pierre subsequently flees to Algeria where he meets Zohra, a beguiling woman with whom he starts a passionate relationship. When he returns to France, he takes Zohra with him. Marie becomes his mistress and she and Zohra both engage in erotic games with Pierre and pose nude for him. They discover themselves by transgressing the norms of the bourgeois society they live in.

Marie starts to invent stories to inflame Pierre’s erotic imagination. With these stories she gains power over him and discovers her sexuality and literary voice. When Pierre abandons Marie again for Africa, Marie feels a terrible emptiness and discovers she is pregnant. When Pierre returns he and meets his and Marie's child and makes peace with Henri. Marie accepting their odd arrangement arranges for Pierre to sleep with her sister and get married, so that they can all be tied together. Marie begins to publish her stories and feel more settled in her life with Henri and Pierre. She becomes a respected writer who signed her first book, "L'Inconstante", under the pseudonym Gérard d'Houville.

== Cast ==
- Noémie Merlant as Marie de Heredia
- Niels Schneider as Pierre Louÿs
- Benjamin Lavernhe as Henri de Régnier
- Camélia Jordana as Zohra Ben Brahim
- Amira Casar as Madame de Heredia
- Scali Delpeyrat as José-Maria de Heredia
- Mathilde Warnier as Louise de Heredia
- Mélodie Richard as Hélène de Heredia
- Émilien Diard-Detoeuf as Jean de Tinan
- Damien Bonnard as André Chaumeix

== Critical reception ==
The film received mixed reviews, with Allociné noting an average rating by professional film reviewers of 2.9/5.

Première found some positive points despite an average rating: "We won't complain about this desire for images and beauty that is cruelly lacking in French cinema". Le Monde was a little more severe: "…the film does not really problematize the question of the image, for which it substitutes a somewhat adulterated sensualism".
