= A Good Man (2020 film) =

- Release poster
- Directed by: Marie-Castille Mention-Schaar
- Written by: Marie-Castille Mention-Schaar; Christian Sondregger
- Produced by: Marie-Castille Mention-Schaar
- Starring: Noémie Merlant; Soko; Vincent Dedienne; Gabriel Almaer; Alysson Paradis; Anne Loiret; Geneviève Mnich; Jonas Ben Ahmed
- Cinematography: Myriam Vinocour
- Edited by: Benoît Quinon
- Production companies: Willow Films; Scope Pictures; France 2 Cinema
- Distributed by: Pyramide Distribution
- Release dates: 6 September 2020 (Deauville); 3 March 2021 (France)
- Running time: 108 minutes
- Countries: France; Belgium
- Language: French

A Good Man is a 2020 French-Belgian drama film, directed and produced by Marie-Castille Mention-Schaar, from a screenplay by Mention-Schaar and Christian Sondregger. It stars Noémie Merlant, Soko, Vincent Dedienne, Gabriel Almaer, Alysson Paradis, Anne Loiret, Geneviève Mnich and Jonas Ben Ahmed.

The film was selected to screen at the 2020 Cannes Film Festival, prior to its cancellation due to the COVID-19 pandemic. It had its world premiere at the Deauville Film Festival on 6 September 2020. It was released on 3 March 2021, by Pyramide Distribution.

== Plot ==
Benjamin and Aude want to have a baby, but when they discover Aude is unable to conceive Benjamin comes up with a plan.

== Cast ==
- Noémie Merlant as Benjamin
- Soko as Aude
- Vincent Dedienne as Antonie
- Gabriel Almaer as Erwann
- Alysson Paradis as Annette
- Anne Loiret as Eva
- Geneviève Mnich as Jeannette
- Jonas Ben Ahmed as Neil

== Release ==
The film was set to have its world premiere at the Cannes Film Festival in May 2020, prior to its cancellation. It had its world premiere at the Deauville Film Festival on 6 September 2020. It was released on 3 March 2021.
