= Mi Iubita Mon Amour =

2021 film by Noémie Merlant

- Directed by: Noémie Merlant
- Written by: Noémie Merlant; Gimi-Nicole Covaci
- Produced by: Pierre Guyard; Noémie Merlant
- Starring: Noémie Merlant; Gimi-Nicole Covaci; Sanda Codreanu
- Cinematography: Evgenia Alexandrova
- Edited by: Sanabel Cherqaoui
- Production company: Nord-Ouest Films
- Distributed by: Tandem Films
- Release dates: 13 July 2021 (Cannes); 27 July 2022 (France)
- Running time: 95 minutes
- Country: France
- Language: French
- Box office: $39,790

Mi Iubita Mon Amour (Romanian and French for "my beloved") is a 2021 French romantic drama film directed by, co-written by, and starring Noémie Merlant.

== Plot ==
Jeanne is on her bachelorette trip with friends in Romania. After their car gets stolen, they are taken in by the family of Nino, a Romani 17-year-old who finds a connection with Jeanne and joins them on their way to the beach.

== Cast ==
- Gimi-Nicole Covaci as Nino
- Noémie Merlant as Jeanne
- Sanda Codreanu as Katia
- Clara Lama-Schmit as Lola
- Alexia Lefaix as Helena
- Kita Covaci as Nino's Mother
- Jean Covaci as Nino's Father
- Giani Covaci as Nino's Brother
- Wallerand Denormandie as Victor, Jeanne's fiancé

Covaci's real-life family played his character's family.

== Production ==
Mi Iubita Mon Amour was Noémie Merlant's feature film directorial debut. The film came about on the "spur of the moment" during a visit to Romania by Merlant, Gimi-Nicolae Covaci, and other cast members—Merlant's close friends—in the summer of 2020. It was co-written by Merlant and Covaci, who had previously appeared in Merlant's short film Shakira (2019). A small crew worked on the low-budget shoot over two weeks. Merlant said that the script "left room" for improvisation.

== Release ==
Mi Iubita Mon Amour premiered on 13 July 2021 in Special Screenings at the Cannes Film Festival.

== Critical reception ==
On Rotten Tomatoes, the film has an approval rating of 57% based on seven reviews. The Guardian critic Peter Bradshaw described the film's dialogue scenes as "very watchable", but thought the ending was unsatisfying. A critic for Screen Daily credited the film for its "sure-footed handling of tangled emotional issues", though an IndieWire editor found Merlant "unwilling to grapple with the uncomfortable questions her story asks" regarding the relationship of Nino and Jeanne.
