= Marie de Régnier =

French novelist and poet (1875–1963)

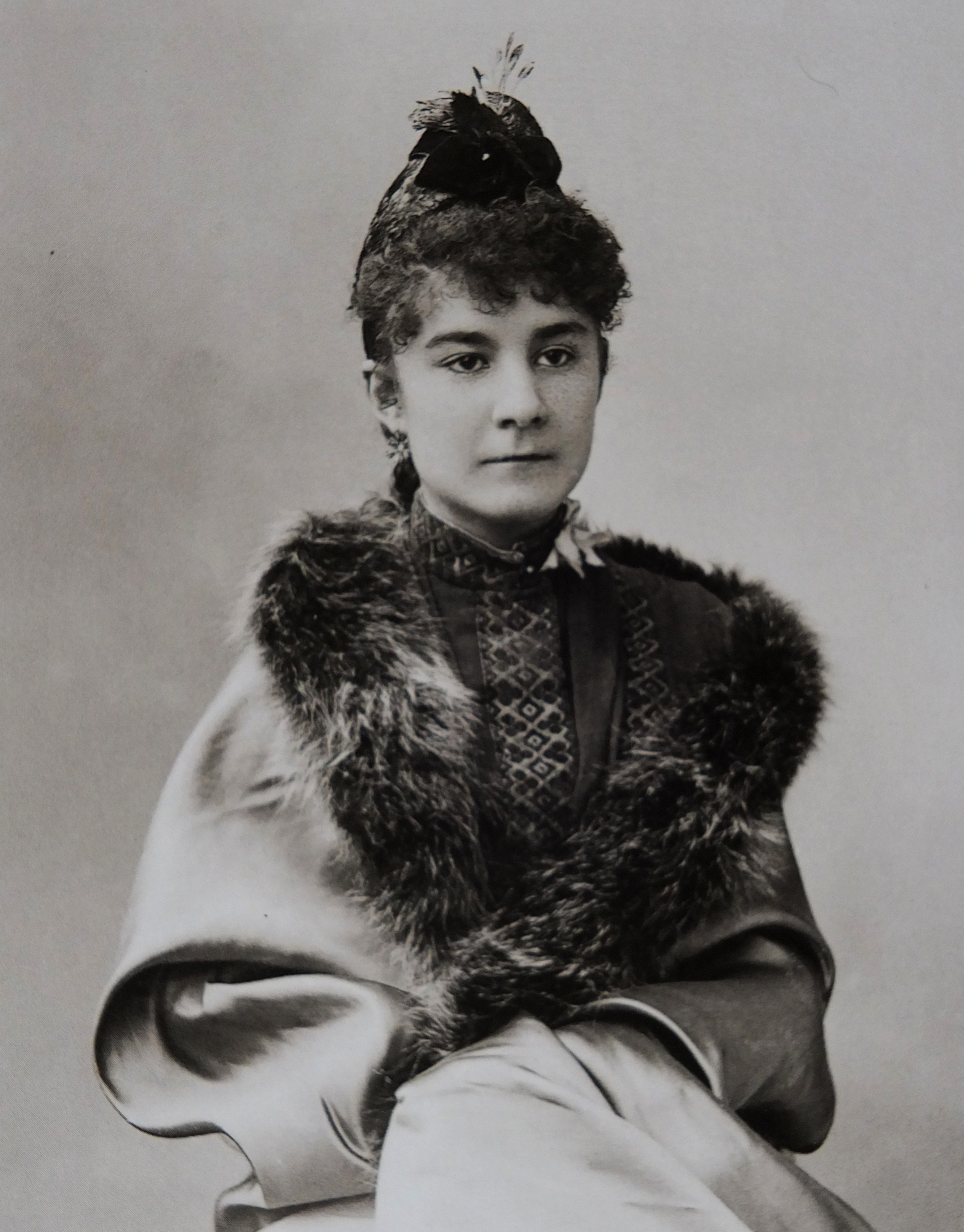
- Marie de Régnier in 1889, photographed by Paul Nadar
- Born: Marie-Louise Antoinette de Heredia; 20 December 1875; Paris, France
- Died: 6 February 1963 (aged 87); Suresnes, France
- Occupations: Novelist; poet
- Spouse: Henri de Régnier
- Relatives: José-Maria de Heredia (father)
- Writing career
- Pen name: Gérard d'Houville
- Language: French
- Notable awards: Grand prix de littérature de l'Académie française, 1918

Marie de Régnier (French: [maʁi də ʁeɲe]; 20 December 1875 – 6 February 1963), also known by her maiden name Marie de Heredia or her pen-name Gérard d'Houville (French: [ʒeʁaʁ duvil]), was a French novelist and poet, and closely involved in the artistic circles of early twentieth-century Paris.

== Biography ==
Marie de Heredia was the second of three daughters of Cuban-born French poet José-Maria de Heredia, and from an early age she mixed with many writers and artists who came to her father's house, including Leconte de Lisle, Anna de Noailles, Paul Valéry, Pierre Louÿs and Anatole France.

Her private life was somewhat convoluted. She married poet Henri de Régnier, but had a long-term relationship with Pierre Louÿs, who was probably the father of her son Pierre de Régnier (1898–1943). She also took several other lovers, including Edmond Jaloux, Jean-Louis Vaudoyer, Gabriele D'Annunzio (during his exile in Paris from 1910 to 1914), and dramatist Henri Bernstein. Her association with openly lesbian colleagues also led to rumours about her own sexuality.

== Works ==
Though sometimes better known for her liaisons with other artists, Marie de Régnier was a very accomplished poet and novelist in her own right, "considered one of the most gifted of the bevy of women writers that her age produced". Her first attempts at poetry were written at the Bibliothèque de l'Arsenal, where her father was a director. He and his friends encouraged her talents from a very young age, and she eventually began publishing under her married name, later taking the masculine-sounding pseudonym "Gérard d'Houville" (derived from the name of a Norman grandmother, "Louise Gérard d'Houville" or "Girard d'Ouville"). She later said her use of a pen-name was a way of distancing herself from her more famous husband and father, but it was not a serious attempt to disguise her sex: contemporary critics and commentators always referred to "Madame" Gérard d'Houville.

Her work appeared notably in the Revue des deux Mondes from 1894 and was widely admired, with some critics comparing her favourably to Mallarmé. Many of these poems have still not been collected into a modern edition. Her first novel, L'Inconstante, appeared in 1903.

== Critical reception and legacy ==
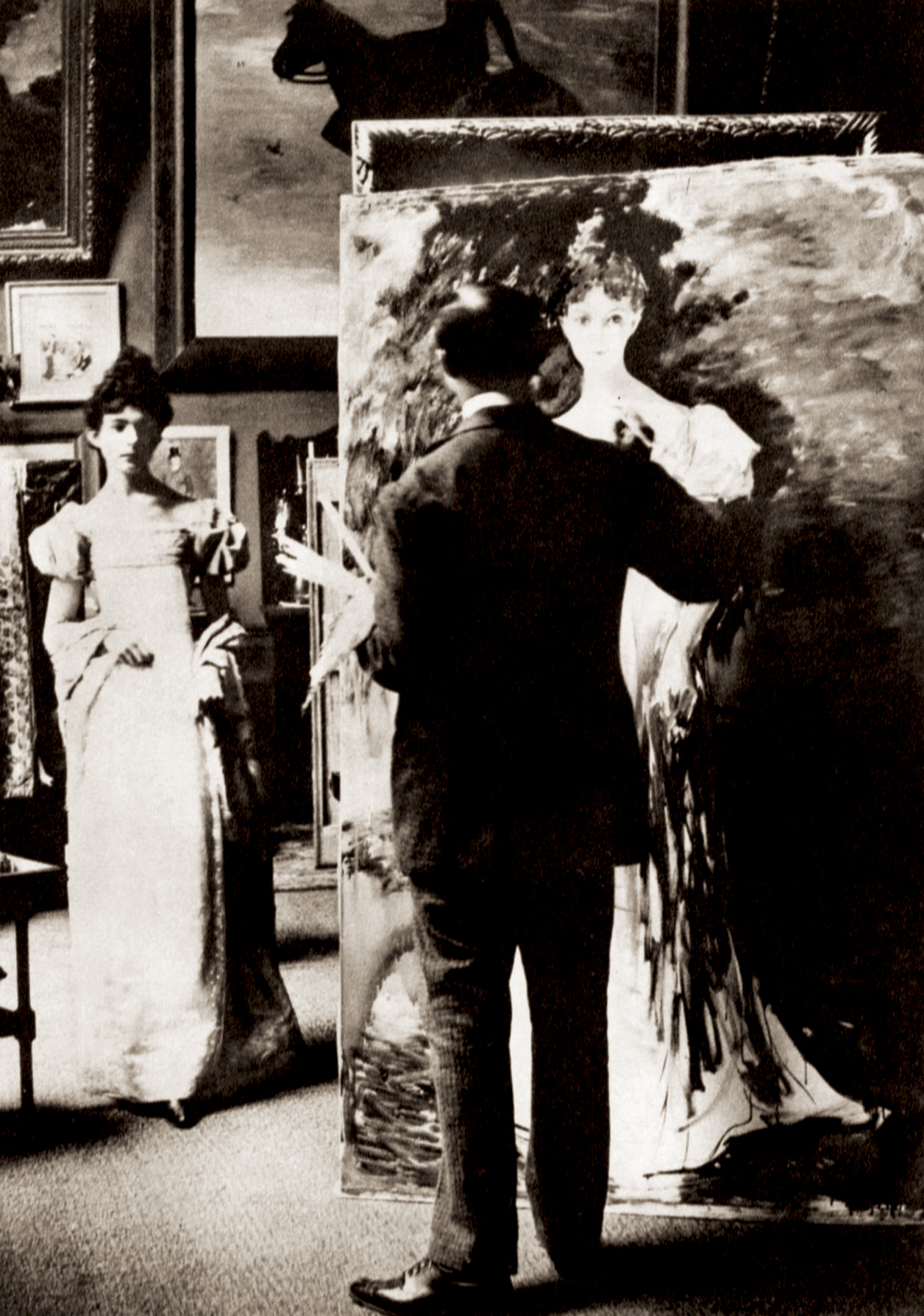
Marie de Régnier posing for her portrait in the workshop of Jacques-Émile Blanche, 1893. Photograph by Giuseppe Primoli.

De Heredia's work was acclaimed throughout her career and she was a popular writer with the public as well as critics. When French newspaper L'Intransigeant asked readers in 1910 to name the top three female writers deserving of a place in the Académie française, "Gérard d'Houville" was placed in top position, above Anna de Noailles and Colette. In 1918 she was the recipient of the Académie française's inaugural Grand Prix de Littérature, awarded for her fiction, and in 1958 she was also given the Académie's Grand Prix de Poésie for her poetic oeuvre – to this day the only woman to have received both awards.

Several artists and painters of the time took her portrait, including Jacques-Émile Blanche and Jean-Louis Forain. She was also the subject of several of Pierre Louÿs's nude photographs.

== Select bibliography ==
- L'Inconstante, roman, 1903
- Esclave, 1905
- Le Temps d'aimer, 1908
- Le Séducteur, 1914
- Jeune Fille, 1916
- Tant pis pour toi, 1921
- Le Roman des quatre, 1923 (written in collaboration with Paul Bourget, Henri Duvernois and Pierre Benoit)
- Le Chou, 1924
- Vingt poèmes, 1925
- L'Enfant, 1925
- La Vie amoureuse de l'Impératrice Joséphine, 1925
- Clowns, 1925
- Paris et les voyages, 1925
- Chez le magicien, 1926
- Proprette et Cochonnet, 1926
- Opinions candides, 1926
- Je crois que je vous aime... Sept proverbes, 1927
- Esclave amoureuse, 1927
- La Vie amoureuse de la Belle Hélène, 1928
- Le Diadème de Flore, 1928
- Le Charmant Rendez-Vous, 1929
- Les Rêves de Rikiki, 1930
- Les Poésies, 1931
- L'Impératrice Joséphine, 1933
- Peau d'âme, 1935
- Le Temps d'aimer, 1935
- Enfantines et Amoureuses, 1946

== Film ==
- 2019 : Curiosa, an erotic French movie directed by Lou Jeunet.
