= Siegrid Alnoy =

French director and screenwriter (born 1971)

- Born: April 19, 1971 (age 55); Rochefort, Charente-Maritime, France
- Occupations: Director, Screenwriter
- Notable work: Elle est des Nôtres

Siegrid Alnoy (born April 19, 1971, in Rochefort, Charente-Maritime, France) is a French director and screenwriter. She has directed and written several shorts, as well as two television films and one feature film. She is best known for her feature film Elle est des Nôtres (She's One of Us) which has won several awards and was shown at the Cannes Film Festival.

== Early life and education ==
Alnoy was born in Rochefort, Charente-Maritime, France.

From 1989 to 1990 Alnoy went to post secondary for superior mathematics and literature, specifically modern letters. She finished her studies with a PhD and Masters in Cinematography and Audiovisual Research, and her doctorate thesis discussed "The Notion of First Film in Europe."

== Career ==
=== Early career ===
Before her career in film, Alnoy had a brief career as a dancer. After she directed Quand Mon Doigt Par Mégarde (1993) Alnoy began working as a script writer for the National Center of Cinema. She then moved on to Arte TV Channel in the same position and directed two television films for this TV company.

=== Cinema ===
==== Feature film ====
Alnoy has one feature film entitled Elle est des Nôtres, which debuted in 2003. It has two titles in English, She's One of Us and For She's a Jolly Good Fellow. The original title idea was L'Idiote.

Elle est des Nôtres follows the story of Christine Blanc (Sasha Andrès) as she works at a temp agency. Her career and social life have fallen into a standstill and Blanc has great difficulty with social interactions. The film portrays her as a naive, almost idiotic character. It is only once she murders her boss, Patricia (Catherine Mouchet) that her life takes a turn and she lands a long-term contract, has friends, and is generally successful. However the investigation and guilt haunt her and Blanc inevitably hands herself over to the police. The film covers themes around alienation experienced by workers, particularly female employees, in a modern, capitalist society and the feelings of invisibility that result.

The film was screened at three film festivals: Cannes Film Festival, the Stockholm Film Festival, and the Thessaloniki Film Festival. It was shown in the category of "Divers Section Parallele (First Film)" at the Cannes Film Festival. The judges at the Thessaloniki Film Festival gave her a Special Mention in the category of feature film. Elle est des Nôtres went on to e given a prize from the Fédération Internationale de la Presse Cinématographique (FIPRESECI).

==== Television films ====
Alnoy has two television films both produced by Arte TV where she worked as a screenwriter. Her first film was Nos Familles in 2007. She was the director, co-screenwriter, and co-dialogist on this film. This film is set in a psychiatric institution.

Her second film is from 2012, Miroir Mon Amour / Mirror My Love, is an adaption of Snow White and the Seven Dwarves.

==== Short films ====
Alnoy has directed and written five short films. Her first short is Quand Mon Doigt Par Mégarde (1993) which was made on 16mm film. Nos Enfants (1998) follows three mothers and their children at a playground. Notre Amnesia (2001) follows the story of a 20-year-old Arab street vendor who sells flowers in France. Her two other shorts are Le Contre-Ciel (1996) and Regarde-Moi (2000).

== Filmography ==
Short Films
Year	Title	Position
1993	Quand Mon Doigt Par Mégarde	director, screenwriter
1996	Le Contre-Ciel	director, screenwriter
1998	Nos Enfants	director, screenwriter
2000	Regarde-Moi	director, screenwriter
2001	Notre Amnésie	director, screenwriter

Feature & Television Films
Year	Title	Position
2003	Elle est des Notres	director, co-screenwriter
2007	Nos Familles	director, co-screenwriter
2013	Miroir Mon Amour	director, screenwriter
