= WOMEN! =

- Also known as: Vous les femmes
- Genre: Sketch comedy
- Created by: Judith Siboni; Olivia Côte
- Written by: Judith Siboni; Olivia Côte
- Directed by: Christian Merret-Palmair
- Starring: Judith Siboni; Olivia Côte
- Country of origin: France
- Original language: French
- No. of seasons: 4
- No. of episodes: 432

Production
- Production company: CALT / Téva

Original release
- Network: Téva
- Release: 25 May 2007

WOMEN! (French: Vous les femmes, "You women" premiered 2007) is a French sketch comedy show starring Judith Siboni and Olivia Côte. Season 1 was produced by David Lanzmann, seasons 2, 3 and 4 were produced by Christian Merret Palmair. It was originally shown on M6, before being adapted and broadcast abroad on numerous different channels. In France each of the 400+ sketches is considered an episode, whereas in the UK (where the show was retitled WOMEN!) between ten and twenty sketches were put together to make one 30 minute episode.

== Comedy ==
Written by and starring Judith Siboni and Olivia Côte, the pair play various female characters from different French socio-cultural backgrounds — BCBG mother, bachelorette, nymphomaniac lawyer, stressed office worker, consumer think tank - usually urban, aged between 25 and 35. These women are portrayed in ordinary situations that quickly turn absurd and comical. The show's website writes that "the series shows the paradox of modern women in undermining the image of the sexy, romantic and perfect."

After the show found success, French celebrities began to make cameo appearances in the show, including Mélanie Laurent, Alexandre Astier, Miou-Miou, and Pierre Richard.

== International broadcasters ==
The series was broadcast on téva in 2007 and rebroadcast on Italian television from 2009.

The series was adapted by and sold abroad. It has been broadcast in more than 25 countries, including: Switzerland, Spain (Vosotras las mujeres), Canada, Finland, Italy (Così fan tutte), Japan, Russia, Ukraine, Poland, Hungary (Nők!), Romania, Slovenia, Croatia, Serbia and Montenegro, North Macedonia, Turkey (Ah Biz Kadınlar), and Bosnia and Herzegovina. In the United Kingdom, WOMEN! was broadcast on BBC Two, starting 20 October 2011.
