= José-Maria de Heredia =

Cuban-French poet (1842–1905)

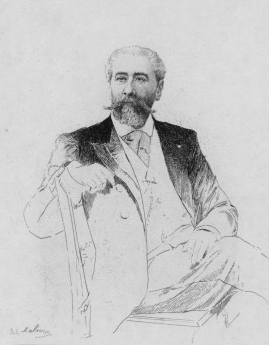
- José-Maria de Heredia as drawn by Adolphe Lalauze
- Born: 22 November 1842; Fortuna Cafeyere, Cuba
- Died: 3 October 1905 (aged 62); Seine-et-Oise, France
- Resting place: Bonsecours, France
- Education: École Nationale des Chartes
- Occupations: Poet, librarian
- Children: Marie de Régnier
- Writing career
- Language: French
- Literary movement: Parnassianism

José-Maria de Heredia (22 November 1842 – 3 October 1905) was a Cuban-born French Parnassian poet. He was the fifteenth member elected for seat 4 of the Académie française in 1894.

== Biography ==
=== Early years ===
Heredia was born at Fortuna Cafeyere, near Santiago de Cuba, to Domingo de Heredia Mieses Pimentel Guridi native of Santo Domingo and his second wife, French Louise Girard d'Houville. At the age of eight he went from the West Indies to France, returning from there to Havana at age seventeen, and finally making France his home not long afterwards. He received his classical education with the priests of Saint Vincent at Senlis, and after his visit to Havana he studied at the Ecole des Chartes at Paris. During the later 1860s, with François Edouard Joachim Coppée, René François Armand Sully-Prudhomme, Paul Verlaine and others less distinguished, he was one of the poets who associated with Charles Leconte de Lisle, and were given the name of "Parnassiens".

=== Career ===
To this new school, form – the technical part of their art – was of supreme importance, and, as a reaction against the influence of Alfred de Musset, they repressed in their work the expression of personal feeling and emotion. "True poetry," said M. de Heredia in his discourse on entering the academy, "dwells in nature and in humanity, which are eternal, and not in the heart of the creature of a day, however great." De Heredia wrote very little, and published even less, but his sonnets were circulated in manuscript form, and gave him a reputation before they were published in 1893, together with a few longer poems, as a volume, with the title Les Trophées. In the original work, he called to his great friend, the artist Ernest Jean-Marie Millard de Bois Durand, to illustrate his book of original watercolors.

He was granted French nationality in 1893 and was subsequently elected to the Académie française on 22 February 1894, in the place of Charles de Mazade the publicist. Few purely literary men can have entered the academy with so few credentials. A small volume of verse; a translation, with introduction, of Diaz del Castillo's History of the Conquest of New Spain (1878–1881); a translation of the life of the nun Alferez (1894), Thomas De Quincey's "Spanish Military Nun"; one or two short pieces of occasional verse; and an introduction or so – this is but small literary output. But the sonnets are of their kind among the most skilled of modern literature. "A Légende des siècles in sonnets" M. François Coppée termed them. In 1901 de Heredia became librarian of the Bibliothèque de l'Arsenal at Paris. He died at the Château de Bourdonné in Seine-et-Oise on 3 October 1905, having completed his critical edition of André Chénier's works.

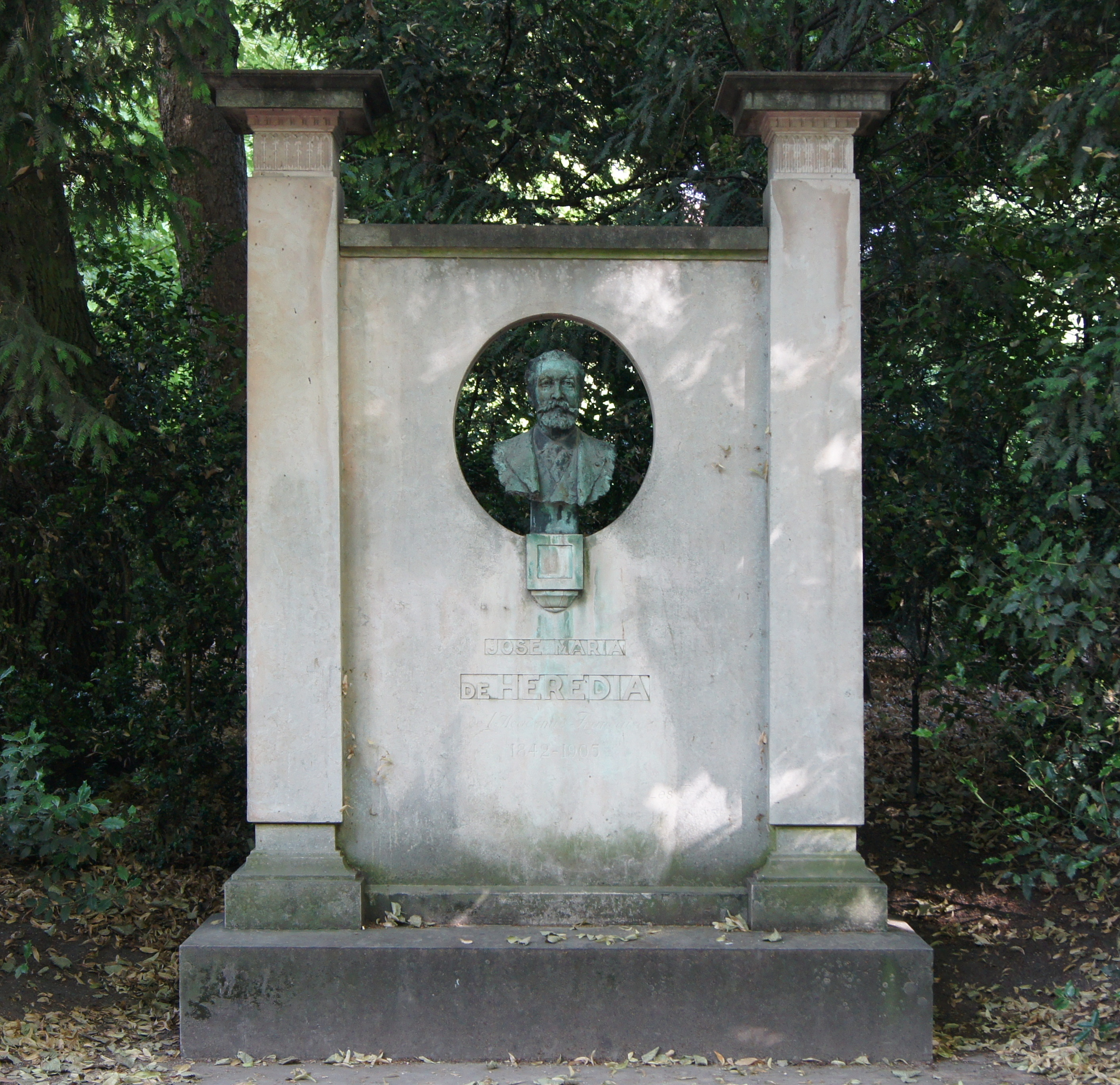
Bust by Victor Segoffin, Jardin du Luxembourg, Paris

== See also ==
- José María Heredia y Campuzano Cuban poet
- Severiano de Heredia Cuban-born politician naturalized as French
