= Marie-Castille Mention-Schaar =

French film director, producer and screenwriter

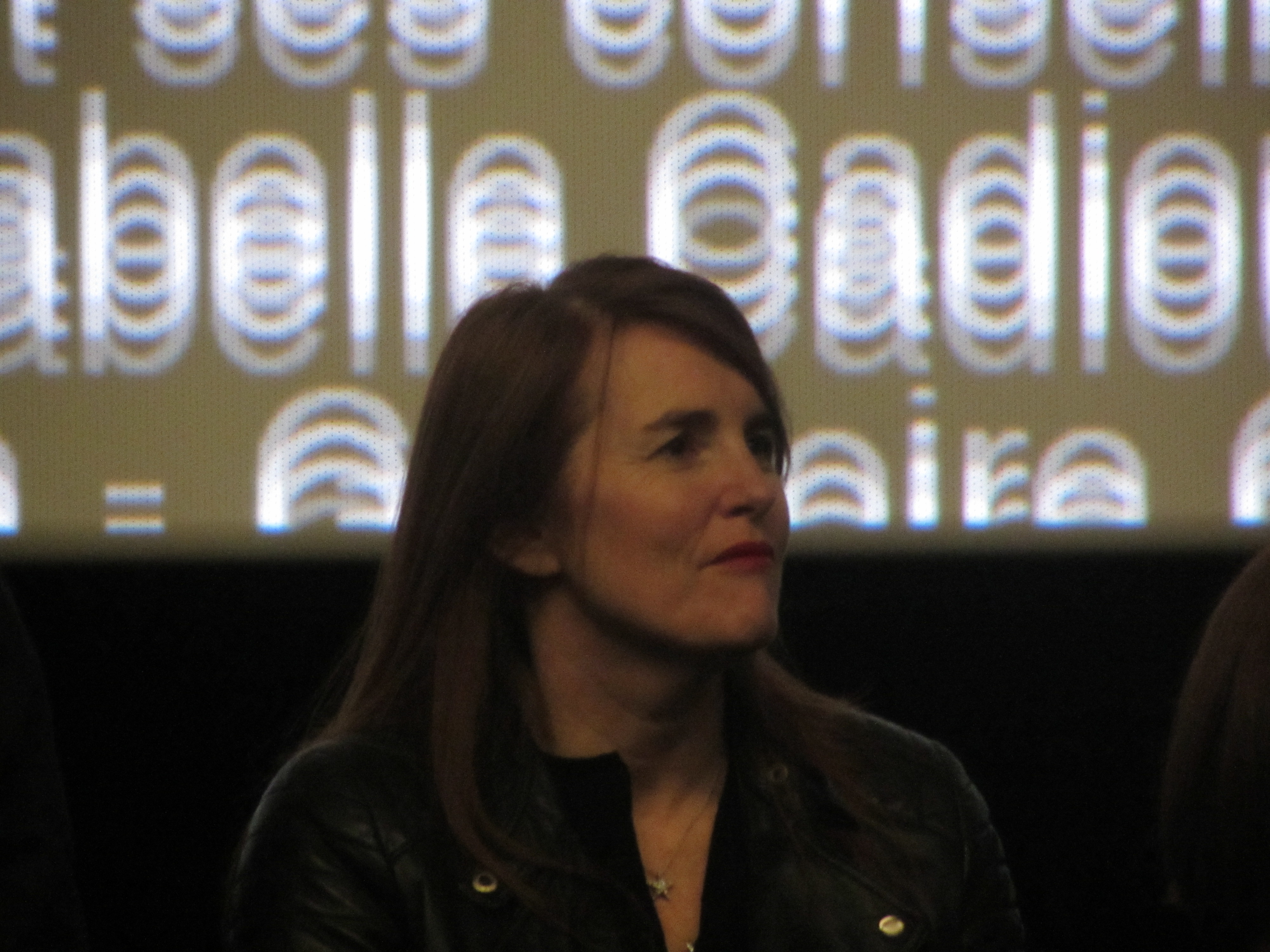
- Born: 26 January 1963 (age 63)
- Occupations: film director, screenwriter, producer
- Years active: 2010s-present
- Children: Zachary Mention Lotz, Sarah-Franklin Schaar

Marie-Castille Mention-Schaar (born 26 January 1963) is a French film director, producer and screenwriter. She is most noted for her 2016 film Heaven Will Wait (Le Ciel attendra), for which she was a nominee for the Lumière Award for Best Screenplay at the 22nd Lumière Awards.

Her newest film, A Good Man, was named as an Official Selection of the 2020 Cannes Film Festival.

== Filmography ==
- Wah-Wah - 2005 (producer only, directed by Richard E. Grant)
- Ma première fois - 2012
- Bowling - 2012
- Once in a Lifetime (Les Héritiers) - 2014
- Heaven Will Wait (Le Ciel attendra) - 2016
- All About Mothers (La Fête des mères) - 2018
- A Good Man - 2020
