= Lisa Azuelos =

French director, writer, and producer

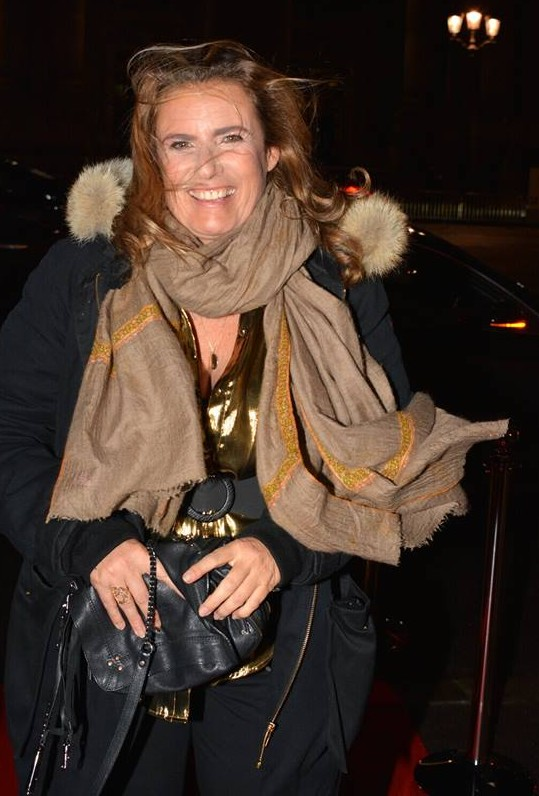
- Born: Elise-Anne Bethsabée Azuelos; 6 November 1965 (age 60); Neuilly-sur-Seine, Hauts-de-Seine, France
- Other name: Lisa Alessandrin
- Occupations: Film director, producer, writer
- Spouse: Patrick Alessandrin (divorced)
- Children: 3

Lisa Azuelos (born Elise-Anne Bethsabée Azuelos; 6 November 1965) is a French director, writer, and producer. She is the daughter of singer Marie Laforêt.

== Biography ==
Lisa Azuelos is the daughter of French singer and actress Marie Laforêt and of Judas Azuelos, a Moroccan Jew of Sephardic descent. She has a younger brother and a step-sister, Deborah.

Her parents separated when she was 2 years old. Her mother kept her and sent her with her brother to a Swiss boarding school, "Les Sept Nains", where children were allegedly maltreated physically and mentally. Afterwards the two siblings were sent to live with someone in a small village in the department of Sarthe.

She stayed with her father since the age of twelve. That is the time she discovered his Sephardic heritage.

Lisa Azuelos was introduced to her future husband, film producer Patrick Alessandrin, by Luc Besson. The couple has three children, Carmen, Illan and Thaïs. They divorced after 11 years of marriage.

Lisa Azuelos has a film production company, which she named Bethsabée Mucho after her paternal great-grandmother Bethsabée.

== Filmography ==
Year	Title	Credited as				Notes
Year	Title	Director	Screenwriter	Producer	Actress	Notes
1993	Classe mannequin		Yes			TV series
1995	Ainsi soient-elles	Yes	Yes		Yes	Credited as Lisa Alessandrin
1996	La Femme rêvée		Yes			Telefilm; credited as Lisa Alessandrin
2001	15 August		Yes			Credited as Lisa Azuelos-Alessandrin
2002	Ti Amo	Yes	Yes	Yes	Yes	Short
2005	Cavalcade		Yes			
2006	Hey Good Looking!	Yes	Yes			
2008	LOL (Laughing Out Loud)	Yes	Yes		Yes	
2009	Victor		Yes			
2010	Tout ce qui brille			Yes		Co-producer
2012	LOL	Yes	Yes	Yes	Yes	Executive producer
2012	Max			Yes		
2014	Quantum Love	Yes	Yes	Yes	Yes	
2014	Free the Nipple			Yes		
2014	L’Enfer me ment			Yes		Short
2015	14 Million Screams	Yes	Yes	Yes		Short
2015	Noctambule	Yes				Short
2015	One Wild Moment		Yes			
2015	The Boss's Daughter			Yes		
2017	Dalida	Yes	Yes	Yes		
2019	Sweetheart	Yes	Yes	Yes		
